= Seymour Medal =

Award for non-fiction baseball literature

- The obverse side of the Seymour Medal
- Awarded for: "Honors the best book of baseball history or biography published during the preceding calendar year."
- Presented by: Society for American Baseball Research
- First award: 1996
- Most recent winner: Larry R. Gerlach; Lion of the League: Bob Emslie and the Evolution of the Baseball Umpire (2025)
- Website: sabr.org/seymour-medal

The Dr. Harold and Dorothy Seymour Medal, often simply referred to as the Seymour Medal, is an annual literary award given by the Society for American Baseball Research (SABR) to the best baseball historical or biographical book. The award was named in honor of baseball historians Harold Seymour and Dorothy Seymour Mills, co-authors of the Baseball trilogy, a highly acclaimed baseball history series.

First award in 1996, it was initially given to the winner at the annual SABR Conference but is now award at the banquet of the annual NINE Spring Training conference in Tempe, Arizona. The winner is given a bronze medal 3 1/2 inches in circumference. The obverse side shows the profiles of the Seymours, along with their names and background sketch of a baseball diamond. On the reverse side is SABR's name and logo, with crossed bats and a glove holding a baseball etched onto the background, an open book.

== List of winners and finalists ==
=== 1996 ===
- David Zang, Fleet Walker's Divided Heart: The Life of Baseball's First Black Major Leaguer
  - Charles Alexander, Rogers Hornsby: A Biography
  - David Falkner, Great Time Coming: The Life of Jackie Robinson from Baseball to Birmingham
  - William Humber, Diamonds of the North: A Concise History of Baseball in Canada
  - David Nemec, The Beer and Whisky League: An Illustrated History of the American Association-Baseball's Renegade Major League
  - Henry W. Thomas, Walter Johnson: Baseball's Big Train

=== 1997 ===
- Arthur D. Hittner, Honus Wagner, The Life of Baseball's "Flying Dutchman" McFarland
  - Marty Appel, Slide, Kelly, Slide: The Wild Life and Times of Mike "King" Kelly, Baseball's First Superstar
  - Dennis DeValeria and Jeanne Burke DeValeria, Honus Wagner: A Biography
  - Carl E. Prince, Brooklyn's Dodgers: The Bums, The Borough, and the Best of Baseball for 1947-1957
  - G. Edward White, Creating the National Pastime: Baseball Transforms Itself 1903-1953

=== 1998 ===
- Patrick Harrigan, The Detroit Tigers: Club and Community, 1945-95
  - Greg Rhodes and John Erardi, Big Red Dynasty: How Bob Howsam & Sparky Anderson Built the Big Red Machine
  - Alan M. Klein, Baseball on the Border: A Tale of Two Laredos
  - Arnold Rampersad, Jackie Robinson: A Biography
  - Lyle Spatz, New York Yankee Openers: An Opening Day History of Baseball's Most Famous Team, 1903-2017

=== 1999 ===
- Bruce Markusen, Baseball's Last Dynasty: Charlie Finley's Oakland A's
  - Leonard Koppett, Koppett’s Concise History of Major League Baseball
  - David Pietrusza, Judge and Jury: The Life and Times of Judge Kenesaw Mountain Landis
  - William J. Ryczek, When Johnny Came Sliding Home: The Post-Civil War Baseball Boom, 1865-1870
  - David Stevens, Baseball's Radical for All Seasons: A Biography of John Montgomery Ward
  - David Q. Voigt, The League That Failed

=== 2000 ===
- Bill Marshall, Baseball's Pivotal Era, 1945-1951
  - R. G. Utley and Scott Verner, The Independent Carolina Baseball League, 1936-1938: Baseball Outlaws
  - Bruce Adelson, Brushing Back Jim Crow: The Integration of Minor League Baseball in the American South
  - J. Thomas Hetrick, Chris Von der Ahe and the Saint Louis Browns
  - Bryan DiSalvatore, A Clever Base-Ballist: The Life and Times of John Montgomery Ward
  - Roberto Gonzalez Echevarria, The Pride of Havana: A History of Cuban Baseball
  - Mark Rucker and Peter Bjarkman, Smoke: The Romance and Lore of Cuban Baseball

=== 2001 ===
- Jules Tygiel, Past Time: Baseball as History
  - Reed Browning, Cy Young: A Baseball Life
  - David W. Anderson, More than Merkle: A History of the Best and Most Exciting Baseball Season in Human History
  - Richard Ben Cramer, Joe DiMaggio: The Hero's Life
  - Jim Kaplan, Lefty Grove: American Original
  - Wendy Knickerbocker, Sunday at the Ballpark: Billy Sunday's Professional Baseball Career, 1883-1890
  - Gabriel Schechter, Victory Faust: The Rube Who Saved McGraw's Giants
  - Glenn Stout and Richard A. Johnson, Red Sox Century: One Hundred Years of Red Sox Baseball

=== 2002 ===
- Tom Melville, Early Baseball and the Rise of the National League
  - Robert F. Burk, Much More than a Game: Players, Owners, and American Baseball Since 1921
  - James F. Giglio, Musial: From Stash to Stan the Man
  - Martin Donell Kohout, Hal Chase: The Defiant Life and Turbulent Times of Baseball's Biggest Crook

=== 2003 ===
- Charles Alexander, Breaking the Slump: Baseball in the Depression Era
  - Charles P. Korr, The End of Baseball as We Knew It: The Players Union, 1960-81
  - Howard Bryant, Shut Out: A Story of Race and Baseball in Boston
  - Jon David Cash, Before They Were Cardinals: Major League Baseball in Nineteenth Century
  - David L. Fleitz, Louis Sockalexis: The First Cleveland Indian
  - Leslie A. Heaphy, The Negro Leagues 1869-1960
  - Jane Leavy, Sandy Koufax: A Lefty's Legacy
  - Joseph A. Reaves, Taking in a Game: A History of Baseball in Asia

=== 2004 ===
- Peter Morris, Baseball Fever: Early Baseball in Michigan
  - Reed Browning, 1924: Baseball's Greatest Season
  - James E. Elfers, The Tour to End All Tours: The Story of Major League Baseball's 1913-1914 World Tour
  - Daniel Nathan, Saying It's So: A Cultural History of the Black Sox Scandal
  - Brad Snyder, Beyond the Shadow of the Senators: The Untold Story of the Homestead Grays and the Integration of Baseball

=== 2005 ===
- Neil Lanctot, Negro League Baseball: The Rise and Ruin of a Black Institution
  - Kevin Nelson and Hank Greenwald, The Golden Game: The Story of California Baseball
  - Alan Schwarz, The Numbers Game: Baseball's Lifelong Fascination with Statistics

=== 2006 ===
- David Block, Baseball Before We Knew It: A Search for the Roots of the Game
  - Jean Ardell, Breaking into Baseball: Women and the National Pastime
  - Jonathan Eig, Luckiest Man: The Life and Death of Lou Gehrig
  - Timothy M. Gay, Tris Speaker: The Rough and Tumble Life of a Baseball Legend

=== 2007 ===
- Peter Morris, Game of Inches: The Stories Behind the Innovations That Shaped Baseball
  - Brad Snyder, A Well-Paid Slave: Curt Flood's Fight for Free Agency
  - Mark Lamster, Spalding's World Tour: The Epic Adventure that Took Baseball Around the Globe – And Made It America's Game
  - Merrie Fidler, The Origins and History of The All-American Girls Professional Baseball League
  - Brian Carroll, When to Stop The Cheering?: The Black Press, the Black Community, and the Integration of Professional Baseball

=== 2008 ===
- Lee Lowenfish, Branch Rickey: Baseball's Ferocious Gentleman
  - Norman Macht, Connie Mack and the Early Years of Baseball
  - Adrian Burgos Jr., Playing America's Game: Baseball, Latinos, and the Color Line

=== 2009 ===
- Tom Swift, Chief Bender's Burden: The Silent Struggle of a Baseball Star
  - Andy J. Schiff, The Father of Baseball: A Biography of Henry Chadwick
  - Daniel R. Levitt, Ed Barrow: The Bulldog Who Built the Yankees' First Dynasty

=== 2010 ===
- Larry Tye, Satchel: The Life and Times of an American Legend
  - Robert E. Murphy, After Many a Summer: The Passing of the Giants and Dodgers and a Golden Age in New York Baseball
  - Allen Barra, Yogi Berra: Eternal Yankee

=== 2011 ===
- Lyle Spatz and Steve Steinberg, 1921: The Yankees, the Giants, and the Battle for Baseball Supremacy in New York
  - Mark Armour, Joe Cronin: A Life in Baseball
  - Edward Achorn, Fifty-Nine in '84: Old Hoss Radbourn, Barehanded Baseball, and the Greatest Season a Pitcher Ever Had
  - Jane Leavy, The Last Boy: Mickey Mantle and the End of America's Childhood

=== 2012 ===
- Glenn Stout, Fenway 1912: The Birth of a Ballpark, a Championship Season, and Fenway's Remarkable First Year
  - Neil Lanctot, Campy: The Two Lives of Roy Campanella
  - John Thorn, Baseball in the Garden of Eden: The Secret History of the Early Game

=== 2013 ===
- Robert K. Fitts, Banzai Babe Ruth: Baseball, Espionage, and Assassination during the 1934 Tour of Japan
  - Tony La Russa and Rick Hummel, One Last Strike: Fifty Years in Baseball, Ten and a Half Games Back, and One Final Championship Season
  - Norman Macht, Connie Mack: The Turbulent and Triumphant Years, 1915-1931

=== 2014 ===
- Gerald C. Wood, Smoky Joe Wood: The Biography of a Baseball Legend
  - Stuart Banner, The Baseball Trust: A History of Baseball's Antitrust Exemption
  - Doug Wilson, The Bird: The Life and Legacy of Mark Fidrych
  - Tom Dunkel, Color Blind: The Forgotten Team That Broke Baseball's Color Line

=== 2015 ===
- Andy McCue, Mover & Shaker: Walter O’Malley, the Dodgers, and Baseball's Westward Expansion
  - Nathaniel Grow, Baseball on Trial: The Origin of Baseball's Antitrust Exemption
  - Rick Huhn, The Chalmers Race: Ty Cobb, Napoleon Lajoie, and the Controversial 1910 Batting Title That Became a National Obsession
  - Dennis Snelling, Johnny Evers: A Baseball Life

=== 2016 ===
- Bill Pennington, Billy Martin: Baseball's Flawed Genius
  - Mark Armour and Daniel R. Levitt, In Pursuit of Pennants: Baseball Operations from Deadball to Moneyball
  - Jennifer Ring, A Game of Their Own: Voices of Contemporary Women in Baseball
  - Steve Steinberg and Lyle Spatz, The Colonel and Hug: The Partnership that Transformed the New York Yankees

=== 2017 ===
- Robert C. Trumpbour and Kenneth Womack, The Eighth Wonder of the World: The Life of Houston's Iconic Astrodome
  - Mitchell Nathanson, God Almighty Hisself: The Life and Legacy of Dick Allen
  - Tom Stanton, Terror in the City of Champions: Murder, Baseball, and the Secret Society that Shocked Depression-Era Detroit
  - Glenn Stout, The Selling of the Babe: The Deal that Changed Baseball and Created a Legend

=== 2018 ===
- Jerald Podair, City of Dreams: Dodger Stadium and the Birth of Modern Los Angeles
  - Marty Appel, Casey Stengel: Baseball's Greatest Character
  - John Eisenberg, The Streak: Lou Gehrig, Cal Ripken Jr., and Baseball's Most Historic Record
  - Robert Garratt, Home Team: The Turbulent History of the San Francisco Giants
  - Debra Shattuck, Bloomer Girls: Women Baseball Pioneers

=== 2019 ===
- Jane Leavy, The Big Fella: Babe Ruth and the World He Created
  - Tony Castro, Gehrig and the Babe: The Friendship and the Feud
  - Anne Keene, The Cloudbuster Nine: The Untold Story of Ted Williams and the Baseball Team That Helped Win World War II
  - Bill Nowlin, Tom Yawkey: Patriarch of the Boston Red Sox
  - Emily Ruth Rutter, Invisible Ball of Dreams: Literary Representations of Baseball behind the Color Line
  - Curt Smith, The Presidents and the Pastime: The History of Baseball and the White House

=== 2020 ===
- Jeremy Beer, Oscar Charleston: The Life and Legend of Baseball's Greatest Forgotten Player
  - David Block, Pastime Lost: The Humble, Original, and Now Completely Forgotten Game of English Baseball
  - William H. Brewster, The Workingman's Game: Waverly, New York, the Twin Tiers and the Making of Modern Baseball, 1887–1898
  - Christopher J. Phillips, Scouting and Scoring: How We Know What We Know about Baseball

=== 2021 ===
- Eric Nusbaum, Stealing Home: Los Angeles, the Dodgers, and the Lives Caught in Between
  - Thomas W. Gilbert, How Baseball Happened: Outrageous Lies Exposed! The True Story Revealed
  - Mitchell Nathanson, Bouton: The Life of a Baseball Original
  - Thomas Wolf, The Called Shot: Babe Ruth, the Chicago Cubs, and the Unforgettable Major League Baseball Season of 1932

=== 2022 ===
- Steven Treder, Forty Years a Giant: The Life of Horace Stoneham
  - Jim Leeke, The Best Team Over There: The Untold Story of Grover Cleveland Alexander and the Great War
  - Lyle Spatz and Steve Steinberg, Comeback Pitchers: The Remarkable Careers of Howard Ehmke & Jack Quinn

=== 2023 ===
- Daniel R. Levitt and Mark Armour, Intentional Balk: Baseball's Thin Line between Innovation and Cheating
  - Peter Dreier and Robert A. Elias, Baseball Rebels: The Players, People and Social Movements That Shook Up the Game and Changed America
  - Judith R. Hiltner and James R. Walker, Red Barber: The Life and Legacy of a Broadcasting Legend

=== 2024 ===
- Steven P. Gietschier, Baseball: The Turbulent Midcentury Years
  - Erik Sherman, Daybreak at Chavez Ravine: Fernandomania and the Remaking of the Los Angeles Dodgers

=== 2025 ===
- Larry R. Gerlach, Lion of the League: Bob Emslie and the Evolution of the Baseball Umpire
  - Lee C. Kluck, Leave While the Party’s Good: The Life and Legacy of Baseball Executive Harry Dalton
  - Keith O'Brien, Charlie Hustle: The Rise and Fall of Pete Rose, and the Last Glory Days of Baseball

=== 2026 ===
- Robert Elias, Dangerous Danny Gardella: Baseball’s Neglected Trailblazer for Today’s Millionaire Athletes
  - Mary Craig, Touching Home: Baseball and the Liberal-Republican Tradition in America
  - Keith Evan Crook, Opening the Door for Jackie: The Untold Story of Baseball’s Integration

== See also ==
- CASEY Award
- List of literary awards
