= Squeeze Play (novel) =

Novel by Jane Leavy

Squeeze Play: A Novel
- 1st edition cover
- Author: Jane Leavy
- Language: English
- Subject: Baseball
- Genre: Sports; Fiction
- Set in: Washington, D.C.
- Publisher: Doubleday
- Publication date: 1990
- Publication place: United States
- Media type: Print
- ISBN: 978-0385263009

Squeeze Play: A Novel is a 1990 novel written by sportswriter Jane Leavy. Based around Leavy's own experiences, the book follows the life of a woman sportswriter who is the beat reporter for a Major League Baseball team.

== Overview ==
The novel is a comic, semi-autobiographical take on the career of a woman sportswriter. It follows Ariadne Bloom "A.B." Berkowitz who is the beat writer for the new (fictitious) Washington Senators, the worst team in the Majors.

A number of stories in the novel are partially inspired from Leavy's own experiences throughout her career and life. However, she stated that the character was not based on her despite the similarities between them, saying:

In some ways, maybe, but anybody who reads Squeeze Play knows this is almost entirely made up... Ol' A.B. is not me, but, if things had happened a bit differently, it could've been.

Leavy later said that writing the novel was a way of telling her bad experiences as a sportswriter without the threat of retribution which was present back when she was a beat reporter herself: "I was operating under the assumption that it was a way of telling the truth without telling the facts."

== Reviews ==
The Washington Post said of the novel: "Squeeze Play is a bawdy baseball novel that takes aim not just at the pompous myths of our national pastime but also at the press box jock sniffers who cover it." Noting its uncensored descriptions of sports locker rooms and the treatment of female sportswriters, it further calls the novel "slapstick with the ring of truth".

Sportswriter Allen Barra, writing in Entertainment Weekly, said of the novel: "It is the funniest, raunchiest, and most compassionate baseball novel I've ever read and is sure to offend some people who cried during Field of Dreams — and that's good enough for me."

== Re-release ==
In 2003, after the success of Leavy's best-selling biography with HarperCollins, Sandy Koufax: A Lefty's Legacy, the publishing company re-released a paperback version of the novel via Harper Perennial.
