= Death and funeral of Babe Ruth =

Funeral of baseball player Babe Ruth

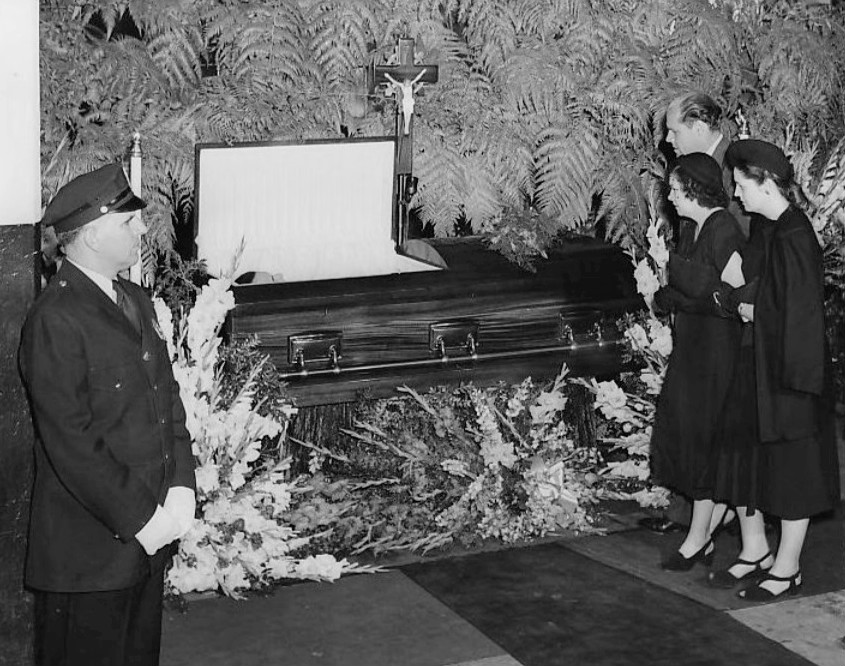
- Babe Ruth lying in state in the rotunda of the old Yankee Stadium
- Date: August 17–19, 1948
- Venue: Yankee Stadium; St. Patrick's Cathedral; Gate of Heaven Cemetery
- Location: New York City, US; Hawthorne, New York, US
- Type: Funeral

Babe Ruth died on August 16, 1948, from a type of throat cancer. He underwent hormone therapy, and surgery in an attempt to treat his cancer. He was also one of the first cancer patients to receive sequential radiation and chemotherapy treatment. The treatments were not successful.

His funeral took place over three days, from August 17 to August 19, 1948. Ruth was a well-known Major League Baseball player who played for the New York Yankees for fifteen years. His funeral included a two-day open casket funeral at Yankee Stadium, a mass at St. Patrick's Cathedral and a burial at the Gate of Heaven Cemetery. The funeral events were attended by many prominent people. A total of 57 honorary pallbearers were appointed for his funeral.

While Ruth's body was lying in state at Yankee Stadium it was estimated that 100,000 fans came to pay their respects at St. Patrick's Cathedral in New York City. Police estimated that 80,000 people stood outside as his cortege arrived for a requiem delivered by Cardinal Francis Spellman. After the requiem, approximately 100,000 people lined the 30 mi (48 km) route to the Gate of Heaven Cemetery in Hawthorne, New York.

== Illness and death ==
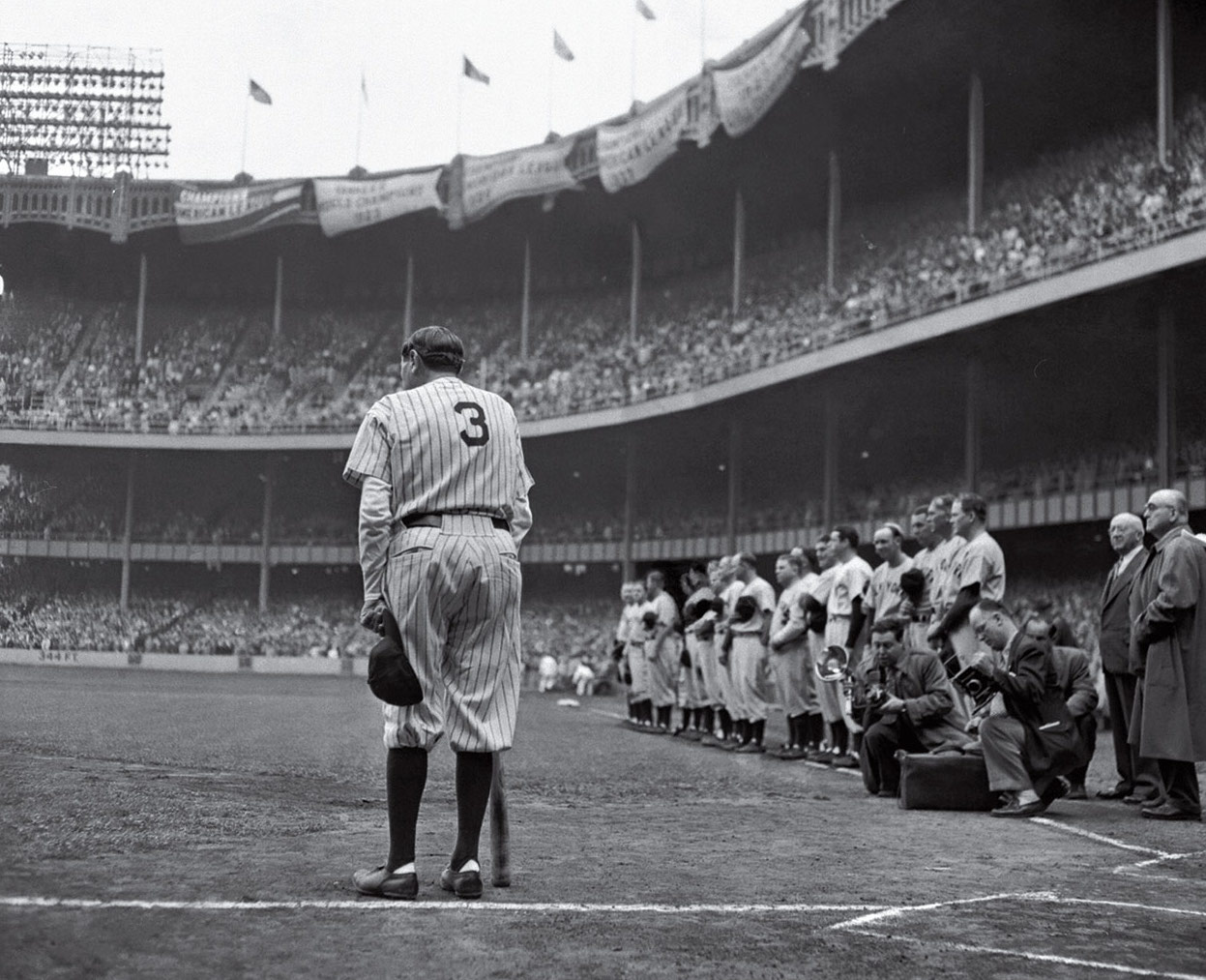
Babe Ruth Bows Out, Nat Fein's Pulitzer Prize-winning photograph of Ruth, two months before his death

In 1946, Ruth began to experience severe pain over his left eye and had difficulty swallowing. Results from tests taken at French Hospital in New York revealed an inoperable malignant tumor at the base of his skull. In his neck, doctors identified a lesion which they diagnosed as nasopharyngeal carcinoma, or "lymphoepithelioma", a type of throat cancer. A physician who reviewed Ruth's autopsy in 1998 concluded that Ruth's lifelong use of tobacco "probably played a part" in his cancer.

Treatments over the next eighteen months proved to be ineffective, with Ruth slowly and notably withering. He was initially treated with painful cancer therapies which were available at the time, including X-ray therapy. He was also injected with female hormones. He underwent unsuccessful surgery to remove the mass. Doctors also tried a new treatment called chemotherapy, which made Ruth one of the first cancer patients to receive sequential radiation and chemotherapy. He was also concurrently given experimental drugs which initially worked, with his health temporarily improving. However, the remission proved to be temporary.

Ruth died in his sleep on August 16, 1948, at 8:01 p.m. in Memorial Hospital in New York City; he was 53 years old. Reverend Thomas F. Kaufmann gave Ruth the last sacrament, later saying: "The Babe died a beautiful death. He said his prayers and lapsed into a sleep. He died in his sleep". Dr. Hayes Martin announced Ruth's death, revealing that the cause of death was cancer. Previously, only his family had known; Ruth had not been told of his diagnosis. His body was taken from the hospital to the Universal Funeral Chapel and his family allowed mourners to visit and pay their respects after 3:00 p.m.

In 2008, dentist and associate professor Dr William James Maloney of New York University proposed that Ruth died of nasopharyngeal carcinoma.

== Funeral ==
Ruth's funeral took place in New York City, over three days. His body was viewed by thousands at Yankee Stadium and St. Patrick's Cathedral. The scale of the event was later described in Life magazine: "When the Yankee slugger died from cancer at the age of 53, he received the kind of tribute normally reserved for kings and presidents. His funeral was a multi-day, multi-site affair".

=== Pallbearers ===
The Babe Ruth Foundation named 57 honorary pallbearers, including many prominent politicians, baseball executives and players, and journalists. Notable pallbearers included:

- Happy Chandler, the Commissioner of Baseball.
- Will Harridge, President of the American League.
- Ford C. Frick, President of the National League.
- Connie Mack, owner of the Philadelphia Athletics.
- Thomas E. Dewey, Governor of New York and then-U.S. presidential candidate.
- William O'Dwyer, Mayor of New York City.
- Thomas D'Alesandro Jr., Mayor of Baltimore.
- James Michael Curley, Mayor of Boston.
- James J. Lyons, Borough President of the Bronx.
- Christy Walsh, Ruth's business manager.
- Dan Topping, President of the New York Yankees.
- Ed Barrow, former general manager of the Yankees.
- Joe DiMaggio, Yankees centerfielder.
- Frank Crosetti, former Yankees shortstop and then-coach.
- Bob Meusel, former Yankees outfielder.
- Benny Bengough, former Yankees catcher and then-Phillies coach.
- Earle Combs, former Yankees outfielder and then-Red Sox coach.
- Joe Dugan, former Yankees third baseman.
- Vernon Gomez, former Yankees pitcher.
- Waite Hoyt, former Yankees pitcher and then-broadcaster.
- Tom Connolly, chief umpire in the AL.
- Bill Klem, chief umpire in the NL.
- Bobby Jones, former golfing champion.
- Jack Dempsey, former heavyweight champion.
- Ed Sullivan, columnist for the New York Daily News and future variety show host.
- Walter Winchell, syndicated gossip columnist and radio broadcaster.
- Westbrook Pegler, syndicated columnist and Pulitzer Prize-winning journalist.
- Grantland Rice, sportswriter for the New York Sun.
- Max Kase, sportswriter for the New York Journal-American.
- John Drebinger, sportswriter for The New York Times
- Rud Rennie, sportswriter for the New York Herald Tribune.
- John Kieran, sportswriter for The New York Times.
- Frank Graham, sportswriter for the New York Journal-American.
- Dan Daniel, sportswriter for New York World-Telegram
- Bill Corum, sportswriter for the New York Journal-American
- Alan J. Gould, sports editor for the Associated Press.
- Bob Considine, journalist and Ruth's biographer.
- Eric Johnston, president of the Motion Picture Association of America.
- William Bendix, actor who portrayed Ruth in The Babe Ruth Story.

=== Yankee Stadium ===
Babe Ruth played for the New York Yankees from 1920 to 1934 and was regarded as one of the greatest baseball players. He starred for them for fifteen years. After his death, thousands of fans were able to view Ruth's body as he lay in state at Yankee Stadium. From August 17th to the 18th his mahagony casket was placed in the stadium lobby which was situated just behind home plate. In the two days that Ruth was displayed in an open casket, it is estimated that 100,000 fans came to file past his casket.

In 1998, the Montgomery Advertiser said that 77,000 people had jammed the streets to wait for their turn to come into Yankee Stadium. People also traveled from other states to pay their respects. After the wake at Yankee Stadium, Ruth's body was moved on the night of August 18th and held at the Universal Funeral Chapel.

=== St. Patrick's Cathedral ===
On August 19, there were 300 police assigned for crowd control at St. Patrick's Cathedral where a service for Ruth was to be held. The Brooklyn Daily Eagle ran the headline, "180,000 Brave Rain as Rites Are Held for Babe Ruth" on August 19, 1948. There was a service for Ruth at St. Patrick's Cathedral and the majority of people could not enter the church so they waited outside. The funeral procession arrived at 11 am and Ruth was carried into the cathedral in a mahogany casket. Roughly 5,000 people were able to enter the cathedral and the police estimated that 75,000 were waiting outside. The Messenger newspaper reported that the crowd fell silent when Ruth's body was taken from the hearse. Only the noise from the policemen's horses walking could be heard, and people looked on from rooftops and from the windows of the buildings near the church. Also attending the funeral were Leo Durocher, manager of the Brooklyn Dodgers, Mel Ott, right fielder of the New York Giants, and Hank Greenberg, former first baseman and outfielder from the Detroit Tigers.

At the cathedral, Ruth's casket was placed on a catafalque which was surrounded by six lit candles. The Archbishop of New York, Cardinal Francis Spellman delivered the requiem. Cardinal Spellman did not deliver a eulogy but he said a special prayer asking that Ruth's memory may inspire future generations. The text of his speech was reported by The Catholic Advance:

May the Divine Spirit that inspired Babe Ruth to overcome hardships and win the crucial game of life animate many generations of American youth to learn to play their positions on all American teams, and may this generous-hearted soul, through the mercy of God, the final scoring of his own good deeds, and the prayers of his faithful friends, rest in everlasting peace. Amen.

=== Burial ===
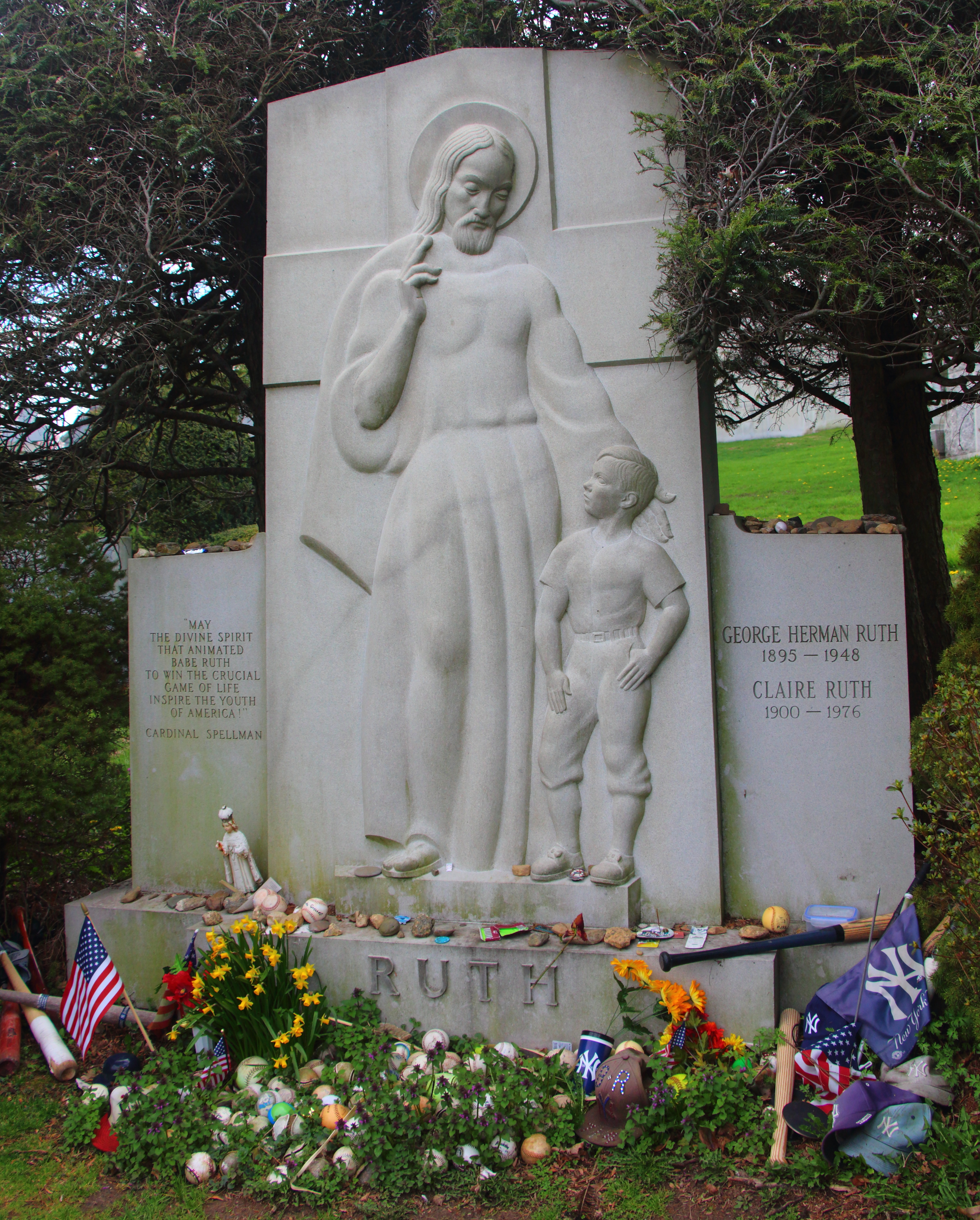
The graves of Babe and Claire Ruth in Hawthorne, New York

Ruth's casket, covered with a blanket of roses and orchids, was carried from St. Patrick's to the hearse after the mass. The St. Louis Globe-Democrat estimated that 75,000 people waited silently outside in the rain for the procession to leave. The procession included five flower cars, several limousines and the hearse carrying Ruth. The procession went through the Bronx, where thousands of people lined the streets to watch.

The Catholic Advance estimated that 100,000 people lined the streets to watch Ruth's funeral procession along the 30 mi (48 km) route. The procession ended at the Gate of Heaven Cemetery where 6,000 people came to pay respect and witness Ruth's casket being interred.

Shortly after Ruth's death the New York City Council voted to create Babe Ruth Plaza near Yankee Stadium. After his burial, a granite monument was placed on top of his gravesite, depicting Jesus Christ blessing a boy in a baseball uniform. His wife Claire was later buried alongside him, after her death in 1976. On September 21, 2008, at the sixtieth anniversary of Ruth's death, St. Patrick's Cathedral held a memorial mass in his honor.

== See also ==
- List of largest funerals
