= Joe DiMaggio's 56-game hitting streak =

Baseball hitting streak

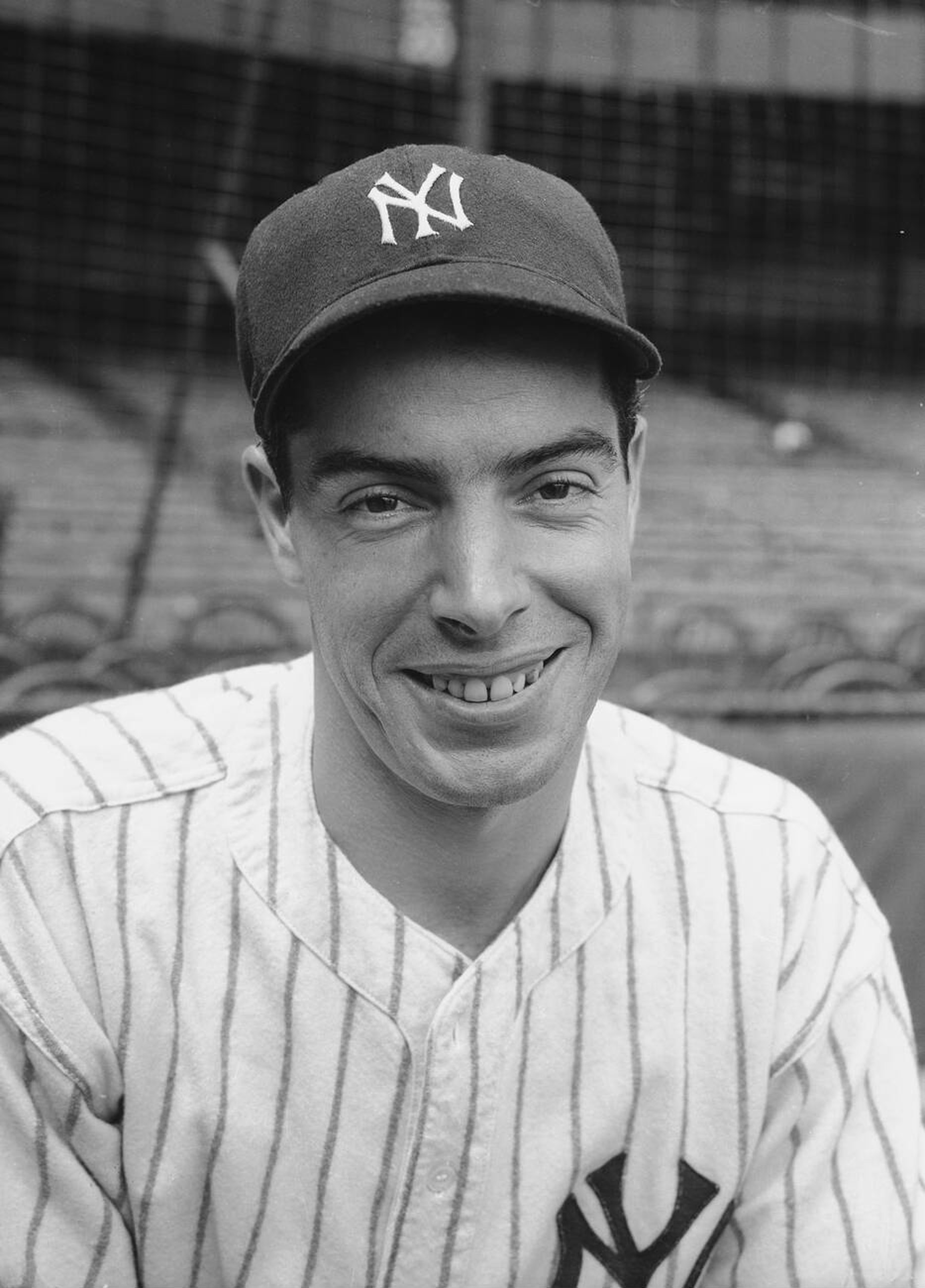
DiMaggio in 1941

During the 1941 Major League Baseball (MLB) season, New York Yankees center fielder Joe DiMaggio recorded at least one hit in 56 consecutive games, breaking the MLB record for the longest hitting streak. His run lasted from May 15 to July 16, during which he had a .408 batting average. DiMaggio's streak surpassed the single-season record of 44 consecutive games that had been held by Willie Keeler since 1897, and the longest streak spanning multiple seasons, also accomplished by Keeler. The record remains held by DiMaggio and has been described as unbreakable.

== Background ==
DiMaggio began his professional career in 1933 with the San Francisco Seals of the Pacific Coast League (PCL). That season, he had hits in 61 straight games, breaking the PCL record of 49 games that had been held by Jack Ness. That streak is the second-longest in the history of Minor League Baseball, behind a 69-game streak by Joe Wilhoit, and remains a PCL record.

After joining the Yankees in 1936, DiMaggio became the club's center fielder and was a member of World Series-winning teams in each of his first four major league seasons. In 1940, however, the Yankees failed to top the American League (AL) for the first time in DiMaggio's career, despite his league-leading .352 batting average, and a 23-game hitting streak that was the longest in MLB that season. The Yankees got off to a mediocre start in 1941, and were mired in fourth place in the middle of May. DiMaggio went through a batting slump in which he hit only .194 over a 20-game period.

Entering the 1941 season, the major league record for the longest hitting streak in a season was held by Willie Keeler, who had hits in 44 straight National League (NL) games in 1897. Keeler also had the longest hitting streak when multiple-season runs were included; he had recorded a hit in the final game of the 1896 season before beginning the following year with the 44-game stretch. The AL record was held by George Sisler, who had a 41-game streak in 1922, one game longer than a 40-game Ty Cobb streak in 1911.

== The streak ==
=== Opening games ===
On May 15, in the first inning of a game against the Chicago White Sox, DiMaggio hit a run-scoring single off of White Sox pitcher Eddie Smith. The Yankees did not score again for the rest of the contest and lost 13–1. In the following day's game, DiMaggio hit a home run and a triple in a win for New York, before a 3–2 defeat to the White Sox in which DiMaggio managed one single in four plate appearances. The St. Louis Browns were the Yankees' opponents in their next series, and in their first game DiMaggio was credited with three hits in as many at-bats despite making weak contact each time. Browns catcher Frank Grube committed catcher's interference by contacting DiMaggio's bat with his glove during a swing, which resulted in a hit being awarded; the others came as a result of defensive miscues. In the subsequent two games against the Browns, DiMaggio had one hit apiece, waiting until the late innings to extend his streak on each occasion. At the time, he did not own the longest hitting streak on the Yankees; Bill Dickey had an active run of 21 consecutive games with at least one hit.

The Detroit Tigers opposed New York in a two-game series; DiMaggio had a hit in each game, recording one in the seventh inning of the second game. Against the Boston Red Sox, he waited even longer to extend the streak to nine games, as it took him until his last at-bat of the contest in the eighth inning to hit a single. DiMaggio had a single that scored two runs in the subsequent game, a 7–6 Yankees win, before a 10–3 loss in which he singled off Red Sox pitcher Lefty Grove in the first inning. In Washington, D.C. on May 27, his run reached 12 games against the Senators with a four-hit performance. DiMaggio contributed a 425-foot home run, which plated two baserunners, and three singles in a 10–8 Yankees victory. The following contest between the teams was the first night game ever held at Washington's Griffith Stadium. DiMaggio was held hitless until the eighth inning, when he tripled to begin a five-run Yankees rally that led to a one-run win.

=== First press coverage ===
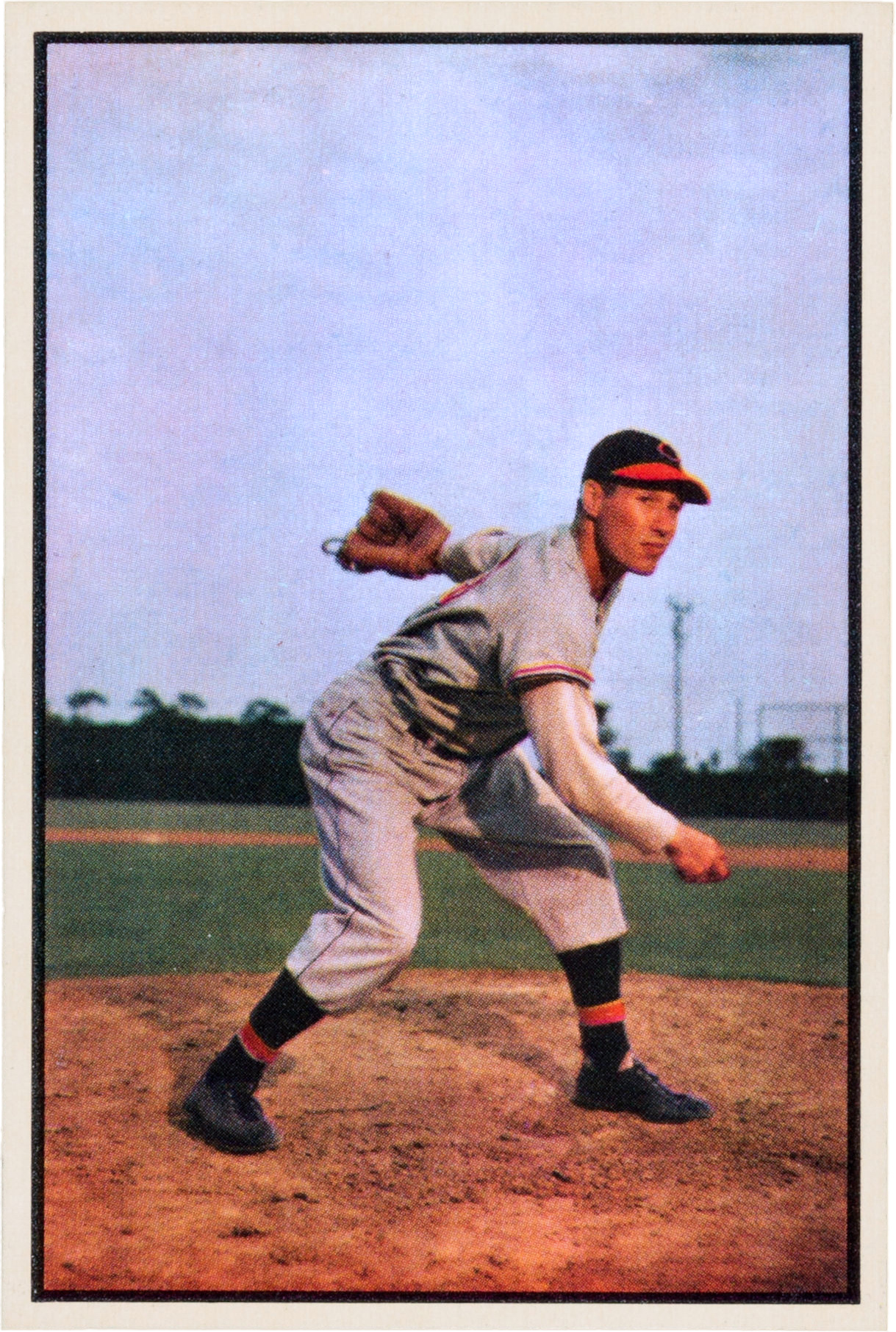
DiMaggio faced Cleveland Indians starting pitcher Bob Feller multiple times during the streak.

By the time the streak reached 13 games, it started receiving attention in the New York City press. Sportswriter Dan Daniel made note of the run on May 28 in the New York World-Telegram; one day later, Jack Smith mentioned the streak after it had reached 14 games. DiMaggio had reached base on a single in the fourth inning against the Senators; after hitting the ball off home plate, he narrowly reached first base ahead of the fielder's throw, according to teammate Johnny Sturm. Although DiMaggio added a single in the sixth inning, that hit was expunged from the record books when rain forced the game to be stopped. Only at-bats from the first five innings counted in the records, meaning that the fourth-inning hit was required to extend the streak. Author Michael Seidel called the game "one of the closest calls for DiMaggio during the streak".

The Red Sox hosted New York in a doubleheader at Fenway Park on May 30. In his first three plate appearances, DiMaggio had two walks and made an out, and the game entered the ninth inning with him still needing a hit to continue the streak. He came up to bat second in the inning, and singled as part of a three-run rally that brought the Yankees back from a 3–1 deficit to win. They lost the second game 13–0, as DiMaggio concluded the day having made four fielding errors during the two games. However, the second game was his 16th in a row with a hit, as a weak fly ball off his bat in the fifth inning eluded Red Sox outfielder Pete Fox for a double. The Yankees traveled to Cleveland for a series against the Indians, who topped the AL standings at the time. After a postponement due to rain, the teams played a doubleheader, which the Yankees swept. DiMaggio recorded a single in the first game and a hit off Indians pitcher Mel Harder in the second. Bob Feller was the opposing starter for the Indians in the final game of the series. Although the Yankees lost 7–5, DiMaggio's run continued with two hits off Feller—a single and a double. Following this game, in an early press mention of the streak, The New York Times made reference to DiMaggio's run in its report. On June 2, the day that Lou Gehrig died, DiMaggio's streak reached 20 games when he homered in a 4–2 Yankees loss in Detroit. Another Yankees loss followed in the second and final game of that series, but DiMaggio tripled in the sixth inning. He was beginning to approach his longest major league hitting streak, the 23-game run he had accomplished in 1940. In St. Louis, DiMaggio singled three times in an 11–7 win for the Yankees, stretching the streak to 22 games. One day after that game, the teams played a doubleheader in which DiMaggio starred. He had a pair of home runs in the first game; in the second game, which lasted only seven innings due to darkness, he added another home run and hit a double off the fence in right field.

On June 10, the Yankees played in Chicago against the White Sox, winning 8–3. DiMaggio was held hitless until the seventh inning, when he sent the ball on a bounce to third baseman Dario Lodigiani, who failed to handle it. The official scorer ruled the play a hit, extending DiMaggio's run to 25 games. Following a rainout the next day, DiMaggio successfully recorded a hit for the 26th straight game in the fourth inning, with a single to center field. Having previously kept the streak alive, he proceeded to hit a home run in the tenth inning, which eventually gave the Yankees another victory. The team returned to Yankee Stadium for a series with the Indians, and Feller was the opposing starting pitcher in their first game. After a walk in his first plate appearance, DiMaggio took three balls from Feller, then opted to swing at the next pitch instead of trying to draw a walk. He made contact, sending a double to right-center field which brought his run to 27 games. In the following game, DiMaggio only needed to wait until the third inning to extend his run, hitting a home run to left field. The homer brought him to within one game of tying the franchise record for the longest hitting streak, which was held by Earle Combs and Roger Peckinpaugh. On June 16, DiMaggio matched their mark with a fifth-inning double.

=== Close calls against Chicago and St. Louis ===
The following game, in which the Yankees played against the White Sox, featured a ruling by official scorer Dan Daniel that impacted DiMaggio's streak. In the seventh inning, DiMaggio came up to the plate without a hit in the game. He sent a ground ball to White Sox shortstop Luke Appling; the ball took a bad bounce off the grass and hopped off Appling, and DiMaggio reached base. Daniel ruled the play a hit, extending the streak to 30. The play ended up being his only hit in an 8–7 Yankees loss, and gave DiMaggio the longest hitting streak in Yankees history. A weakly hit ball produced another hit in the next game. Appling fielded it, but not in time to throw DiMaggio out.

DiMaggio brought the streak to 32 games with a home run and a pair of singles against the White Sox. The Tigers were the Yankees' next opponents, and in the first inning of the opening game of their series, DiMaggio quickly extended the streak by hitting a single. In a 14–4 New York win, he added a double and two more singles. DiMaggio later said that this was when he began to consider the possibility of achieving the longest MLB hitting streak. Again, DiMaggio added to his stretch of hits in the first inning of the next game, and his single brought the run to 34 games. A home run off Tigers pitcher Hal Newhouser in the sixth inning of the teams' June 22 contest extended it further. By this point, sportswriters had begun to take a keen interest in DiMaggio's streak, as newspapers started running headlines reporting on the topic.

On June 24, DiMaggio went hitless in his first three at-bats against the St. Louis Browns, leading to an eighth-inning plate appearance in which he needed a hit for the streak to reach 36 games. As those in attendance chanted "We want a hit", he singled to bring him within five games of Sisler's modern record. The single came off of pitcher Bob Muncrief, who ignored instructions to walk DiMaggio by St. Louis manager Luke Sewell. The next day, DiMaggio achieved an earlier continuation of the streak by homering in the fourth inning, his ninth home run in 20 games. He did not record a hit until his last at-bat against the Browns on June 26, this time doubling during his final opportunity to stretch his run, which stood at 38 games. Regarding the prospect of nearing the hitting streak record, DiMaggio had previously said to the press, "I'm not thinking a whole lot about it. ... I'll either break it or I won't." After this game, though, he publicly expressed a desire to top Sisler's 1922 run.

=== Nearing the MLB hitting streak record ===
The Yankees traveled to Philadelphia for a series with the Athletics; in the first game, DiMaggio only needed one pitch in his first at-bat to record a single, and later added a home run. The starting pitcher opposing the Yankees in the next game was Johnny Babich, who DiMaggio had faced during his 61-game PCL hitting streak. Babich told the local press that he would end DiMaggio's streak by getting him out in his first plate appearance and not giving him hittable pitches afterwards. Babich induced a popout in DiMaggio's first at-bat, and in the third inning threw him three unhittable pitches to begin his next plate appearance. The fourth pitch by Babich was well outside the strike zone, but DiMaggio made a lunging swing and guided the ball between Babich's legs; he ended up with a double which he said left Babich "white as a sheet." In the future, DiMaggio referred to this as "the most satisfying hit of the streak".

=== Surpassing Sisler and Keeler ===
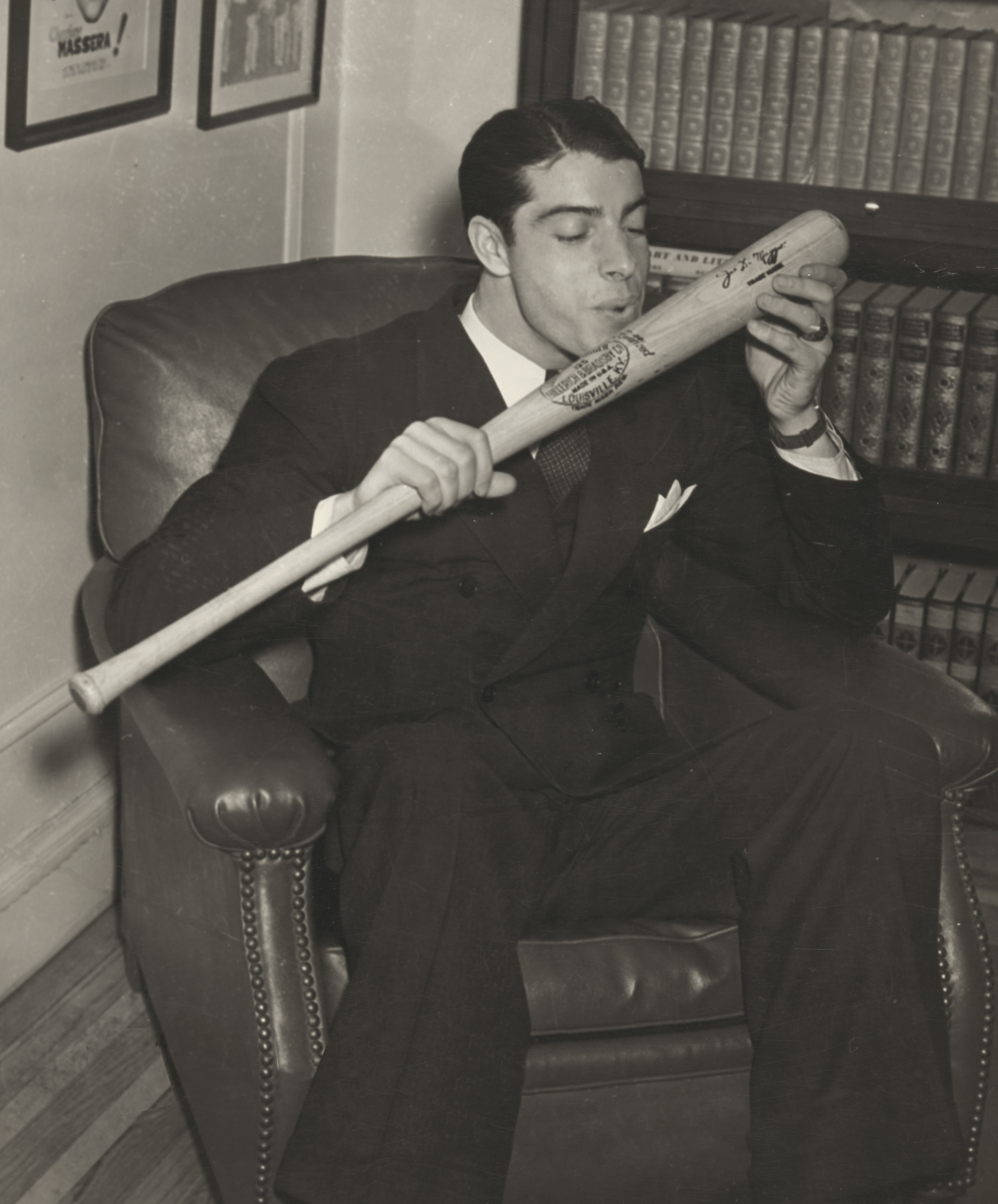
DiMaggio holding his bat after the end of the streak.

Upon a return trip to Washington, a crowd of 31,000 packed into Griffith Stadium to follow DiMaggio's chase during a doubleheader, nearly 30,000 more than had attended the previous game between the Senators and Yankees. Against Senators starting pitcher Dutch Leonard, DiMaggio flied out to center field in his first at-bat and popped out to third base in his second. His third at-bat, in the sixth inning, saw DiMaggio swing at one pitch and miss before taking a ball; on the third pitch, he struck a double to left-center field.

DiMaggio encountered an unexpected obstacle as he prepared to hit in the second game; his favorite bat had gone missing. It was stolen from the Yankees' dugout, which forced him to use a less-preferred bat. He recorded outs in each of his first three at-bats, and came up again in the seventh inning. For this at-bat, he followed a recommendation by teammate Tommy Henrich to use his bat, which DiMaggio had originally given to him. On the second pitch, DiMaggio singled to pass Sisler. The missing bat was eventually found and returned to him before the Yankees' contest on July 5.

Although the press ran stories on DiMaggio passing Sisler's modern-day record and the achievement received fan acclaim, newspapers had discussed the longer mark set by Keeler in some prior accounts, and DiMaggio had been made aware of Keeler's run by a reporter. The Yankees faced the Red Sox in a doubleheader, with DiMaggio in position to tie Keeler's single-season record with hits in each game. In front of 53,000 spectators at Yankee Stadium, he popped out in the first inning and grounded out in the third. Two innings later, DiMaggio and pitcher Mike Ryba battled to a full count, before DiMaggio hit a high chopper that never left the infield. Red Sox third baseman Jim Tabor fielded the ball, but his throw was off-target as a hustling DiMaggio reached first base. Daniel ruled the play a hit, extending the streak. It was the first of two hits for DiMaggio in the game, which the Yankees won 7–2. In the second game of the doubleheader, he quickly tied Keeler's 44-game run with a first-inning single.

On July 2, DiMaggio attempted to break Keeler's record for the longest single-season MLB hitting streak, against the Red Sox at Yankee Stadium. His first at-bat nearly produced a record-breaking hit, but Red Sox outfielder Stan Spence made a leaping catch to temporarily deny him the mark. Following a groundout in the third inning, DiMaggio batted again in the fifth. This time he hit a home run to left field over the head of Ted Williams, which gave him MLB's longest single-season hitting streak at 45 games. After the Yankees' next game was postponed due to rain, the team next played on July 5 against the Athletics, and DiMaggio wasted no time lengthening his streak to 46 games; in the first inning, he hit another home run.

=== Extending the record to 56 games ===
The Yankees played the Athletics in a doubleheader on July 6, with the first game featuring a rematch between DiMaggio and Babich. This time, Babich was unable to utilize his attempted strategy from their previous encounter, as DiMaggio singled off of him in the first inning. He added a double and two more singles later in the game, as part of an 8–4 Yankees victory. In the second game, DiMaggio tripled in his initial at-bat to run the streak to 48 games; a third-inning double gave him his sixth hit during the doubleheader. This was also the day a monument to Lou Gehrig was unveiled in center field of Yankee Stadium.

Following a break for the All-Star Game, in which DiMaggio doubled in the eighth inning, the Browns opposed the Yankees in St. Louis on July 10. In the first inning of a contest stopped in the sixth inning by rain, he hit a bouncer to Browns shortstop Alan Strange, who knocked the ball down but was unable to make an attempt to throw out DiMaggio, who was credited with a hit. In his attempt to reach the 50-game mark, DiMaggio had four hits against the Browns the following day, including a ninth-inning home run and three singles. He subsequently secured a double in the fourth inning of the teams' game one day later, before the Yankees traveled to Chicago for a doubleheader against the White Sox. DiMaggio recorded three hits in the opening contest and a single in the second, bringing the streak to 53 games. The next day, DiMaggio hit a popup to center field, which was mishandled by White Sox second baseman Bill Knickerbocker. Despite the protestations of DiMaggio's teammates, the play was scored as an error on Knickerbocker. In his second plate appearance, DiMaggio was required to bring a new bat to the plate, as he had broken one while swinging at the popup. He walked, and saw two balls to start his at-bat in the sixth inning. He then hit a weak grounder to third base, and beat the throw to first base for a hit.

The Yankees again played against the White Sox on July 15, facing Eddie Smith, against whom DiMaggio had recorded his first hit of the streak in May. In his first chance to extend his run to 55 games, DiMaggio hit a ground ball to Chicago shortstop Appling, who committed a fielding error. He again hit a ground ball in the direction of Appling in the third inning, but it eluded him for a hit. It was the first of two for DiMaggio in a 5–4 Yankees win, as he doubled as well. The next day, at Cleveland's League Park, DiMaggio hit a single to center field in the first inning to run the streak to 56 games; later in the game, he added another single and a double. Seidel wrote that "DiMaggio's three hits were representative of the range of the streak as a whole: one clean, one a little lucky, and one driven hard and far."

=== End of the streak ===
On July 17, the Yankees again faced the Indians in Cleveland, this time at Municipal Stadium. Against left-handed Indians starting pitcher Al Smith, DiMaggio hit a sharp ground ball down the third base foul line in his first at-bat, but was denied a hit by Indians third baseman Ken Keltner, who managed to field the ball and throw DiMaggio out. Smith walked DiMaggio in his next plate appearance, drawing boos from the Cleveland fans. DiMaggio sent another grounder down the line at third base in the seventh; for the second time in the game, Keltner fielded the ball backhanded and his throw beat DiMaggio to first base.

An inning later, DiMaggio approached the plate with one more opportunity to record a hit in his 57th straight contest, as the Yankees led 4–1. With the bases loaded, he faced right-handed pitcher Jim Bagby Jr., who had just been inserted in relief duties. He hit a ground ball to shortstop Lou Boudreau, which took a hop before reaching him. Regardless, Boudreau successfully fielded the ball and turned a double play, which denied DiMaggio a hit. In the bottom of the ninth inning, the Indians staged a late rally to get within 4–3 and placed a runner at third base with no outs, which created the potential for DiMaggio to bat again in extra innings if Cleveland could tie the score. Yankees reliever Johnny Murphy stopped the Indians from plating the tying run, however, bringing an end to DiMaggio's streak.

== Reaction and statistical summary ==
Despite receiving little press coverage in its early days, the streak ultimately gained significant attention from the media and baseball fans. It served as a distraction at a time when World War II was ongoing in Europe; author Richard Ben Cramer wrote that it "gave America just what it needed: something apart from woe and war to talk about—a summer craze." Fan enthusiasm continued climbing even after DiMaggio had set the record, as large crowds filled stadiums to follow his exploits. ESPN's Jayson Stark has described DiMaggio's achievement as "the coolest, most romantic record in sports." Author Maury Allen considered the streak a "crossover event" that raised awareness of DiMaggio among the general population and gave him increased respect from baseball fans.

As of 2024, the mark DiMaggio set in 1941 remains intact. Various analysts have called the record unbreakable. Among the factors cited as making the streak difficult to surpass are a decreasing emphasis on high batting averages for hitters, a higher number of relief pitchers used by teams, and mounting media attention and pressure as lengthy hitting streaks develop. One factor cited by sportswriters in 1941 to explain the streak was DiMaggio's bat control; over the length of his run, he struck out only five times.

During the 56 games that encompassed his 1941 hitting streak, DiMaggio had 91 base hits in 223 at-bats for a .408 average. He had 55 runs batted in during the period, and his hit count included 15 home runs. His 56 runs scored matched the number of games in his streak. In the final 11 games, DiMaggio had a .545 average, with 24 hits in 44 at-bats. DiMaggio faced the Browns and White Sox 12 times each during the streak, the most of any AL opponent. The Athletics and Senators were his least common foes, with the Yankees having played each team five times; however, DiMaggio had his highest batting average against the Athletics, hitting .524 against them. The Yankees moved up significantly in the AL standings during the streak. Before it started, they were five-and-a-half games out of first place in the AL. By the time it ended, the Yankees had improved to 56–27 for the season and were on top of the AL by seven games over the Indians. Their record during the streak was 41–13, with two ties.

DiMaggio's hitting streak has become a comparison for other statistically improbable feats, such as CBS under James T. Aubrey having 14 of the top 15 programs during the 1963–64 United States network television schedule.

== Aftermath ==
In the game after the streak was snapped, DiMaggio recorded two hits off Feller. He posted at least one base hit in each of the following 15 games as well; the streak-breaking contest was the only one in a 73-game span in which he did not have a hit. The Yankees won the AL pennant by a 17-game margin and defeated the Brooklyn Dodgers in the 1941 World Series. DiMaggio was voted the Most Valuable Player in the AL, beating out Ted Williams, who batted over .400 for the season.

== Subsequent challenges ==
Four seasons after DiMaggio's streak, in 1945, Tommy Holmes of the Boston Braves had hits in 37 consecutive games to break the post-1900 NL record; it was the longest hitting streak in that league since Keeler's. The longest hitting streak in MLB from 1946 to 1977 was accomplished by DiMaggio's brother Dom, who had a 34-game run in 1949; no other player exceeded 31 games. In 1978, Pete Rose made a sustained challenge for the record, with base hits in 44 straight contests to tie Keeler's single-season mark in 1897. That is the longest streak since DiMaggio's but still 12 games short of the mark. Nine years later, Paul Molitor came within 17 games of the record, topping out at 39 games.

Since 2000, no player has equaled the streaks of Rose or Molitor. From 2005 to 2006, Jimmy Rollins of the Philadelphia Phillies came the closest, recording hits in 38 consecutive games. The longest single-season streaks were posted by Luis Castillo in 2002 and Chase Utley in 2006, each of whom had a 35-game streak.

== Bibliography ==
- Castro, Tony (2016). DiMag & Mick: Sibling Rivals, Yankee Blood Brothers. Lyons Press. ISBN 978-1-63076-124-0.
- Cramer, Richard Ben (2000). Joe DiMaggio: The Hero's Life. Simon & Schuster. ISBN 978-0-684-86547-8.
- Kennedy, Kostya (2012). 56: Joe DiMaggio and the Last Magic Number in Sports. Sports Illustrated Books. ISBN 978-1-60320-913-7.
- Seidel, Michael (2002). Streak: Joe DiMaggio and the Summer of '41. University of Nebraska Press. ISBN 978-0-8032-9371-7.
