= The Big Fella =

Biography of Babe Ruth by Jane Leavy

The Big Fella: Babe Ruth and the World He Created
- Author: Jane Leavy
- Language: English
- Subject: Babe Ruth
- Genre: Biography; Sports history
- Publisher: HarperCollins
- Publication date: 2018
- Publication place: United States
- ISBN: 978-0-0623-8022-7

The Big Fella: Babe Ruth and the World He Created is a non-fiction book by sportswriter Jane Leavy. The book was published in 2018 by HarperCollins. The book covers the life and career of Babe Ruth, focusing on his creation of modern celebrity culture and his high standing in the game of baseball long after his death.

The book became a highly praised best-seller. It was nominated for the CASEY Award and won the Seymour Medal from the Society for American Baseball Research in 2019.

== Background ==
Unlike previous biographies on Babe Ruth, Leavy's book contains previously unknown details about his childhood, including the divorce of his parents and debunking the myth that Ruth was a delinquent and an orphan but rather an abandoned child. It also lays out how Ruth, with the help of his agent Christy Walsh, created his larger-than-life persona and became the first modern celebrity. Leavy also wrote about Ruth's post-career life and his eventual, painful death from cancer.

Leavy interviewed around 600 people for the book over eight years, including Ruth's last surviving daughter Julia Ruth Stevens, and went through newspaper archives all over the country. Much like her previous biographies, she structured around a three-week barnstorming tour Ruth underwent after his legendary 1927 season where he hit 60 home runs, along with his teammate Lou Gehrig.

== Reception ==
- "Captures Ruth's outsize influence on American sport and culture…. Leavy’s conceit allows her to stake out some untrod turf. But she also makes a compelling case that to appreciate the adulation Ruth soaked up in October 1927 is to understand his contribution to American life in full." – The New York Times
- "What sets “The Big Fella: Babe Ruth and the World He Created” apart from earlier attempts to identify the true essence of the man is an unprecedented look back into Ruth’s long-neglected childhood and a magnified focus on how his tremendous popularity helped birth the cult of personality in America." – Baltimore Sun
- "Jane Leavy writing a book about Babe Ruth is the biggest thing that has happened in my life since Santa Claus visited my classroom in the second grade. This is Babe Ruth off the diamond and out of uniform, a very flawed human being but still very much a hero, a man who could lift an army of beggars and wannabes onto his back and carry them to their dreams." – Bill James
- "Early in her seminal Babe Ruth biography, The Big Fella, Jane Leavy, the gifted storyteller of bygone ballplayers, perfectly encapsulates his place at the intersection of America’s game, Americana and America today." – Jeff Passan
