= Jane Leavy =

American sportswriter

- Born: December 26, 1951 (age 74); Roslyn, New York, U.S.
- Education: Barnard College (B.A.); Columbia University (M.A.)
- Occupations: Sportswriter; Author
- Spouse: Peter Isakoff (divorced)
- Children: 2
- Writing career
- Notable works: A Lefty's Legacy; The Last Boy; The Big Fella
- Notable awards: Seymour Medal (2019); Henry Chadwick Award (2022)
- Website: janeleavy.com

Jane Leavy (/ˈlɛvi/ LEV-vee; born December 26, 1951) is an American sportswriter, biographer, and author who previously worked as a reporter for The Washington Post. Leavy primarily writes about baseball and is best known for her biographies on baseball greats Sandy Koufax, Mickey Mantle, and Babe Ruth.

== Early life ==
Leavy was born into a Jewish family on December 26, 1951, in Roslyn, New York, to Fay (née Fellenbaum) and Morton Leavy. She has a younger sister named Annette. She attended Roslyn High School, and graduated from Barnard College in 1974 and from the Columbia University Graduate School of Journalism in 1976.

Growing up, Leavy was a New York Yankees fan and her childhood hero was Yankees star centerfielder Mickey Mantle. Her other childhood hero was sportswriter Red Smith of the New York Herald Tribune. Leavy wrote her master's thesis on Smith, having decided to become a sportswriter like him while studying at Barnard; it was later published in The Village Voice.

== Career as sportswriter ==
Before joining The Washington Post, Leavy was a staff writer at womenSports and Self magazines. She has written for many publications, including The New York Times, The New York Daily News, Newsweek, Sports Illustrated, and The Village Voice. Like many women sportswriters, particularly at the time, Leavy encountered sexism and harassment while she was working.

Leavy worked at the Post for nine years, covering sports – mainly baseball, tennis, and the Olympics – politics, and popular culture. She was also the beat reporter for the Baltimore Orioles home games, taking over the role from Thomas Boswell. After becoming a mother, Leavy left The Post and turned her focus on writing books and essays.

== Career as author ==
=== Squeeze Play ===
In 1990, Leavy wrote a comic, semi-autobiographical novel called Squeeze Play. Partially based around her own experiences and life, it follows a woman sportswriter who is the beat reporter for the new (fictitious) Washington Senators baseball team. It was described by The Washington Post as a "bawdy baseball novel" and as "slapstick with the ring of truth". The novel was described by Entertainment Weekly as "the best novel ever written about baseball".

=== A Lefty's Legacy ===
Leavy wrote her first best-selling baseball biography on Hall of Fame pitcher Sandy Koufax, called Sandy Koufax: A Lefty's Legacy and published in 2002. The biography was significant as it was written with the somewhat reluctant approval of Koufax, who is famously known for being a private person. While he did not sit down for an interview with her, he allowed her to talk to his friends and old teammates and also agreed to verify biographical facts. The book was written around Koufax's perfect game and details the cultural and social changes that occurred over the course of his career.

=== The Last Boy ===
In 2010, she wrote another best-selling baseball biography called The Last Boy: Mickey Mantle and the End of America's Childhood on her childhood hero, Mickey Mantle. It is an extensive chronicle of Mantle's off-field behavior, his battle with alcoholism, his difficult childhood, and how all of that shaped his career. The book was partly based around a 1983 interview she did with the New York Yankees great while he was working at the Claridge Hotel and Casino in Atlantic City, New Jersey.

Notably, Leavy wrote about Mantle inappropriately feeling up her leg before passing out drunk in her lap during her interview with him when she was a young sportswriter. She later wrote that, in that moment, "my childhood had ended." Leavy berated him the following morning for his behavior. Mantle apologized; later on, he gave her his sweater while he was playing golf which she kept as keepsake.

=== The Big Fella ===
Her third biography, The Big Fella: Babe Ruth and the World He Created, was published in 2018. Unlike previous biographies on Babe Ruth, Leavy's book contains previously unknown details about his childhood. It also lays out how Ruth, with the help of his agent Christy Walsh, created his larger-than-life persona and became the first modern celebrity.

=== Make Me Commissioner ===
In 2023, Leavy announced on her social media accounts that she was working on her fifth book, due to be published by Grand Central Publishing, which is titled Make Me Commissioner: I Know What's Wrong with Baseball and How to Fix It. The book is about the evolution of Major League Baseball over the years and the problems the sport is facing today. It was released on September 9, 2025.

== Awards and recognition ==
All of Leavy's non-fiction books were CASEY Award finalists: A Lefty's Legacy in 2002, The Last Boy in 2010, The Big Fella in 2018, and Make Me Commissioner in 2025.

The Big Fella was a finalist for 'Best Biography' at the National Book Critics Circle Awards in 2018, and won the Seymour Medal from the Society for American Baseball Research (SABR). Both A Lefty's Legacy and The Last Boy were also Seymour Medal finalists.

On September 21, 2018, soon after the release of The Big Fella, Leavy threw the ceremonial first pitch at Yankee Stadium; she got advice from Sandy Koufax prior to the game who told her to stand close to home plate and not go to the mound.

In 2022, Leavy received the Henry Chadwick Award, which honors "baseball's great researchers", from the Society for American Baseball Research.

== Personal life ==
Leavy primarily lives in Washington, D.C., and Truro, Massachusetts. She has two children, both of whom are adopted: Nick (born 1985) and Emma (born 1988) Isakoff. Leavy was previously married to Peter Isakoff; they have since divorced.

== Bibliography ==
=== Books ===
- ——— (1990). Squeeze Play: A Novel. Doubleday. ISBN 978-0385263009.
- ——— (2002). Sandy Koufax: A Lefty's Legacy. HarperCollins. ISBN 978-0060195335.
- ——— (2010). The Last Boy: Mickey Mantle and the End of America's Childhood. HarperCollins. ISBN 978-0060883522.
- ——— (2018). The Big Fella: Babe Ruth and the World He Created. HarperCollins. ISBN 978-0062380227.
- ——— (2025). Make Me Commissioner: I Know What's Wrong with Baseball and How to Fix It. Grand Central Publishing. ISBN 978-0306834660.

=== Other contributions ===
- ——— (2007). "Coaching Bob". In Andrew Blauner (ed.). Coach: 25 Writers Reflect on People Who Made a Difference. Grand Central Publishing. ISBN 978-0446514606.
- ——— (2012). "Sully and The Mick". In Rob Fleder (ed.). Damn Yankees: Twenty-Four Major League Writers on the World's Most Loved (and Hated) Team. Ecco Press. ISBN 978-0062059628.
- ——— (2013). "Sandy Koufax: Best Bar Mitzvah Guest Ever". In Franklin Foer; Marc Tracy (eds.). Jewish Jocks: An Unorthodox Hall of Fame. Twelve Books. ISBN 978-1455516131.
