= Sandy Koufax: A Lefty's Legacy =

Biography of Sandy Koufax by Jane Leavy

- Author: Jane Leavy
- Language: English
- Subject: Sandy Koufax
- Genre: Biography; Social history
- Publisher: HarperCollins
- Publication date: 2002
- Publication place: United States
- ISBN: 978-0060195335

Sandy Koufax: A Lefty's Legacy is a non-fiction book by sportswriter Jane Leavy. Published by HarperCollins in 2002, the book follows the career trajectory of Sandy Koufax, Hall of Fame pitcher for the Los Angeles Dodgers, and the social changes which occurred during it. The book also covers Koufax's role in baseball's labor movement and his impact on and standing in the Jewish American community. It is structured around a retelling of Koufax's perfect game on September 9, 1965.

== Background ==
Leavy, a former sportswriter for The Washington Post, initially was not expecting to write to the book on Koufax who known for declining interview requests and preferring not to be written about at all. After hearing her out and agreeing to meet her at Dodgertown in Vero Beach, Florida, Koufax gave his reluctant approval, telling her, "This book has to be yours, not mine."

Though he did not sit down for an interview with her, Koufax allowed her to talk to his friends and old teammates, who would not have otherwise sat down for an interview, and also agreed to verify biographical facts. The only people he requested she not talk to were the children of his sister, a request Leavy honored. She ended up interviewing over 400 people for the book.

The book's purpose, according to Leavy, was to document Koufax's career in light of the social changes that took place, including the civil rights movement, the advent of television in sports, and the labor movement in baseball. Though she did not discuss Koufax's private life in detail, she wrote about his personality and his aversion from his own celebrity and reasons for his want of privacy. She also wrote of Koufax's relationship with Judaism and his own Jewish identity in light of his decision to sit out Game 1 of the 1965 World Series due to it falling on Yom Kippur which made him a Jewish icon.

Notably, Leavy structured the book around Koufax's perfect game. She found rare footage of the first three innings of the game, taken by Dodgers trainer Bill Buehler. Additionally, she received a copy of the nearly complete recording of the game from David Smith, founder of Retrosheet, whose father recorded the game for him while he was out with his girlfriend (later wife).

== Reviews ==
Upon its release, the book was widely praised for its writing and prose and became a New York Times best seller. It was nominated for both the CASEY Award and the Seymour Medal as the best baseball book of the year. The Society for American Baseball Research (SABR) later named it one of its top 50 best baseball books during its 50th anniversary celebrations in 2021, writing: "Until Sandy decides to finally write his own life story, this biography will be the standard other books will try to live up to."

Writing for Time magazine, Daniel Okrent praised the book: "Leavy has hit it out of the park... A lot more than a biography. It's a consideration of how we create our heroes, and how this hero's self perception distinguishes him from nearly every other great athlete in living memory... a remarkably rich portrait."

The Austin Chronicle described the book as "compelling", writing: "As the national pastime, baseball has always been a sociocultural barometer of the American experience. Washington Post sportswriter Jane Leavy understands the intricacies of this truism, and it's one reason why her biography of Koufax is so compelling. The media, labor relations, and religious bigotry are just a few of the topics she blends into the tale... Through hundreds of discussions with players, managers, fans, and fellow sportswriters, Leavy pieces together the story of the handsome, articulate, complex, reticent, Brooklyn-born southpaw who conquered baseball and the sports world at large."

Allen Barra of The New York Times praised the book for debunking myths about Koufax's supposed isolation: "It's... nice to know that contrary to so many reports, including a magazine cover story a couple of years ago that labeled him "the incomparable and mysterious Sandy Koufax," he is not and has never been a recluse."

== New York Post controversy ==
In December 2002, a few months after the book had been released, the New York Post published a false story about Koufax and the biography, insinuating that he only agreed to cooperate because Leavy threatened to out him as gay if he did not. The Post retracted the story and apologized after Leavy denied there was such a deal, calling it "thoroughly erroneous on all counts."

As both the newspaper and the Los Angeles Dodgers were, at the time, owned by Rupert Murdoch's News Corp, Koufax decided to cut ties with the team for the remainder of Murdoch's ownership tenure, stating that he did not want to help promote any of News Corp's subsidiaries as he would "feel foolish to be associated with or promote one entity if it helps another." He reconnected with the organization in 2004, when the Dodgers were sold to Frank McCourt.

== Re-release ==
A second edition of the book, titled Sandy Koufax: A Lefty's Legacy (P.S.), was released in 2010 by Harper Perennial.
