= Rud Rennie =

Sportswriter for the New York Herald Tribune (1897–1956)

Cecil Rutherford "Rud" Rennie (August 8, 1897 – October 6, 1956) was a sportswriter for the New York Herald Tribune, chiefly assigned to the New York Yankees baseball team and the New York Giants football team, for some 36 years. He was a friend and confidant of sports figures such as Babe Ruth, Lou Gehrig, Joe DiMaggio, Pepper Martin, and Dizzy Dean, as well as colleagues in the press box. His writings and remarks have been quoted. Rennie was a member of The Newspaper Guild from its founding in 1933. He served on the board of directors of the Baseball Writers' Association of America, yearly selection committees for Most Valuable Player and the Honor Roll and the executive committee of the New York Chapter.

== Early life ==
He was born Cecil Claire Rutherford Rennie on August 8, 1897, in Toronto, the son of Scottish-born parents James Rennie, a coachman-driver, and Christina Rutherford, a cook, both in domestic service. Later in his life, some media reported that his given first name was "Clare" or "Claire," but this is not supported by official records. When he was 2 the family relocated to New York City, where he was raised on the Upper West Side of Manhattan. He attended Barnard School for Boys, a private boys’ academy, now the Horace Mann School. He entered the School of Journalism at Columbia College, Columbia University in September 1915. He was a member of Phi Delta Theta fraternity and active on the school newspaper.

== Military service ==
Upon America's declaration of war against Germany on April 6, 1917, in his sophomore year, Rennie withdrew to enlist. He signed into the New York National Guard on April 27, 1917 and was mustered in as a private in the 29th Company, 8th Regiment, of the United States Army Coast Artillery Corps on July 22, 1917. After training, he was assigned to Battery C, 58th Artillery, of the Coastal Artillery Corps at Fort Schuyler. Rennie made Private First Class on February 1, 1918. He served overseas between May 10, 1918 to April 27, 1919. He was promoted to Corporal on October 1 1918 and Sergeant on November 24, 1918.

Engagements of the American Expeditionary Forces in France in which he participated included St. Mihiel, Meuse-Argonne. Post-Armistice, he participated in the general defense duty recognized as "Defensive Sector." For his service Rennie was awarded the Victory Medal with Service Clasps. He continued to write while serving in active duty. His wartime journals contain multiple references to his beginning freelance journalism career, with submissions of poems, short stories, and articles to magazines and newspapers. Rennie was honorably discharged after return to the U.S. in May 1919.

== Journalism career begins ==
In New York City, Rennie briefly worked as a beat reporter for the morning edition of The Sun, in 1919–1920. In the latter year Rennie was hired at the New York Tribune as a general assignment reporter. He covered police cases and ship arrivals of Hollywood, Broadway, and sports stars. He was promoted to assistant city editor in 1922. Rennie became a naturalized U.S. citizen on 16 June 1922,

Taking a leave of absence from the Tribune in August 1922, Rennie sailed to Europe to settle a maternal aunt's estate, thereafter touring Ireland, England, Scotland, and France (including places significant to his wartime military service) until the end of 1922.

== Family ==
Rennie married Mary Cecilia Maloney (born in Massachusetts of Canadian parentage) on July 18, 1925 at New York's Church of the Transfiguration, Episcopal (Manhattan). There were no children. The Rennies lived in Forest Hills, Manhasset, and finally Huntington, New York. Cecil Rutherford "Rud" Rennie's wife, who went by the name Cecilia M. Rennie, died in August 1954.

Rennie's father James Rennie died in New Jersey, working as driver for Governor George Sebastian Silzer, in 1923. His mother Christina Rutherford Rennie's last recorded employer was James J. Goodwin, banker and cousin to financier J. P. Morgan, and who died in 1915. By 1920 she was an inmate at Central Islip State Hospital for the Insane, where she died in 1932.

== Sports reporter, New York Herald Tribune ==
In 1925, Rennie became a sports reporter for the newly consolidated Herald Tribune.

Rennie's primary assignment was the New York Yankees baseball team. He traveled with the team from Florida spring training through the entire playing season, covering every World Series between 1925 and 1953 and all All-Star Games. For the 1936 World Series he was named one of three official scorers, a rotating honor within the profession. Each year he then switched to the New York Giants football team for its season with similar travel to games and bowls.

Rennie was a freelance contributor of sports and general interest articles as well as short stories and poems to magazines including Collier's, The Saturday Evening Post, Sports Illustrated, Life, Reader's Digest, Argosy, Cosmopolitan, and American Legion Monthly. He also ghost-wrote articles attributed to players, managers, and their wives.

== Friendship With Babe Ruth ==
Shortly after transfer to the Herald Tribune sports desk, while attending the February 1926 New York Baseball Writers' Dinner, Rennie showed his easy, boozy, kidding friendship with Babe Ruth—as well as his lifelong musical predilection. According to biographer Kai Wagenheim (Babe Ruth: His Life and Legend), Rennie "stood up…and, in a tremulous tenor voice, warbled a parody of little [Yankees manager] Miller Huggins (lyrics by Bill Slocum) that had the boys dripping tears of laughter into their fruit salad:

I wonder where my Babe Ruth is tonight? / He grabbed his hat and coat and ducked from sight. / He may be at some cozy roadside inn, / Drinking tea—or maybe gin. / He may be at a dance, or may be in a fight. / I know he's with a dame, / I wonder what's her name? / I wonder where my Babe Ruth is tonight?

"Ruth was there," continues Wagenheim, "and he laughed louder and clapped harder than anyone else at the table."

Rud Rennie served as an honorary pallbearer in Babe Ruth's funeral in 1948.

== Friendship with Lou Gehrig ==
In his stories and magazine features, Rennie was an early booster of the Yankees’ first baseman and slugger Lou Gehrig, who had joined the team in 1923 and enjoyed his breakout season in 1926. When in 1936 it was noted in the media that Olympic swimmer Johnny Weissmuller was retiring from his long screen role as Tarzan the Ape Man in the Hollywood films memorializing the hero of Edgar Rice Burroughs’ novels, with urging by Gehrig's wife Eleanor (for whom Rennie had ghosted a magazine article), as well as his agent, Rennie promoted his friend Lou Gehrig's cause in Hollywood as an actor. He helped arrange photography shoots (Gehrig in a leopard-skin and wielding a cave-man's club) and screen tests of the muscular first baseman; he buttonholed agents, producers such as Sol Lesser, and Hollywood columnists such as Louella Parsons in a publicity campaign to boost Gehrig's chances. The slugger himself was unenthusiastic about swinging from jungle vines and wrestling lions, but he told Rennie that he wouldn’t say no to a man-of-the-people role in a western or mystery picture. The Tarzan effort fell as if from a high height with a thumbs down from producer Sol Lesser and a telegram from author Edgar Rice Burroughs to Gehrig, care of United Press, so the Yankee could read it in his morning newspaper: "Having seen several pictures of you as Tarzan and paid about $50 for clippings on the subject, I want to congratulate you on being a swell first baseman." Gehrig did appear in one 1938 Sol Lesser-produced "B-movie," a sodbuster called "Rawhide," with Gehrig playing himself as a baseball great retired to run a ranch, who is menaced by bandits.

With Gehrig's 1939 diagnosis of A.L.S. (amyotrophic lateral sclerosis, a progressive neurodegenerative disease that causes muscle weakness, paralysis, and ultimately, respiratory failure), Rennie remained close to the ballplayer and his wife Eleanor through Gehrig's retirement and downhill slide until Gehrig's death in 1941. A much-cited interchange occurred when Gehrig returned from the consultation and diagnosis at the Mayo Clinic in Rochester, Minnesota. Rennie met his train in Washington, D.C., where the Yankees were to play. A group of Boy Scouts at the station joyfully greeted Gehrig, and yelled, "Good luck with the Series!" Gehrig returned their wave, and leaned toward friend Rennie. "They’re wishing me luck," he said quietly, "and I’m dying."

Rennie was steps away from Gehrig during his famous July 4 Yankee Stadium farewell, with the words, "Today I consider myself the luckiest man on the face of the earth." The article was reprinted in The New York Herald Tribune's commemorative collection of historic sports columns, Wake Up the Echoes, published by Hanover House in 1956.

== A Reporter Restrained: The Great Yankees–Mexican Baseball League Kerfuffle, 1946 ==
In May 1946, the 20-year veteran sportswriter on the Herald Tribune was covering the NY Giants’ football tour, then in Cincinnati, when informed by wire service reporters that he was named in a New York Yankees lawsuit against the Mexican Baseball League; it charged the league with conspiring to poach its players to walk on their contracts and join players south of the border; it aimed to restrain Rennie as an "agent" encouraging such a conspiracy, including recruitment of Rennie's friend Phil Rizzuto, the Yankees’ prize shortstop. The sportswriter was alleged to have been seen in the Yankees' locker room, influencing Rizzuto and other friends to decamp. Rennie, who had been merely sent by the Herald Tribune to cover formation of the Mexican League, finding both positive and negative aspects to the effort, was surprised to be named in the Yankees’ restraining order, and hastened back to New York to defend himself. Despite much media attention to the team's action against Rennie, with the possibility looming that it would blow up into a first amendment case, the matter quickly deflated when the temperamental Yankees president Larry MacPhail withdrew his suit, but not before Rennie was pressured by many in his journalistic cohort to atone by picking up numerous bar tabs; Rennie regained the Yankees’ good graces.

== Jackie Robinson and Big League Color Barrier, 1947 ==
Rud Rennie was in at the creation of another one of baseball's greatest news stories—though he didn't write it, and remained cloaked for decades, past his death. In early 1947, Rennie was traveling with the New York Giants football team in St. Louis and met with an old friend, Dr. Robert Hyland, physician for the St. Louis Cardinals baseball team and a singing partner with Rennie in a boozy amateur barbershop quartet. Hyland confided that some Cardinals players objected to African-American slugger Jackie Robinson "breaking the color barrier" by signing with the Brooklyn Dodgers. On May 21, when the Dodgers were to play St. Louis at Sportsman's Park, Cardinals would go on strike and refuse to play against a black man. Moreover, the strike leaders were aiming on spreading the day's protest throughout the National League, white teams in a general strike until Robinson was booted out of his contract.

"When I heard this from Doc Hyland," Rennie later told fellow Trib sportswriter Roger Kahn, "one word came into my mind. In large letters. INSANITY. Next, What a story! But I couldn't write it. If I did, people who knew of my friendship with Hyland would trace it back to Bob," who would lose his team physician job. So Rennie telephoned his fellow veteran Trib sportswriter Stanley Woodward, "told him what I had," and asked Woodward to "take it from there." Woodward made the tip his own story, contacting many sources—some of whom nervously denied the plot existed, others who admitted it but would not go on the record. The courageous reaction to Woodward's questions and the planned racist action came from National League President Ford C. Frick. Frick, himself a onetime sportswriter, was extensively quoted when he forced a meeting with the Cardinals players and their manager in New York. "If you do this," Frick warned the strikers, "you will be suspended from the league. You will find that the friends that you think you have in the press box will not support you, that you will be outcasts. I do not care if half the league strikes. Those who do it will encounter quick retribution. All will be suspended and I don’t care if it wrecks the National League for five years. This is the United States of America and one citizen has as much right to play as another."

The episode has now been widely cited in books as well as many commemorative articles on anniversaries associated with Jackie Robinson's life, such as Red Smith's column in 1977, "The Outcasts of Cooperstown", when the year's All-Star baseball game was dedicated to the memory of Robinson on the 30th anniversary of his signing with the Brooklyn Dodgers. The quashed players’ strike of 1947 deserved attention, too, Smith wrote, for its ugliness might have succeeded "…if Rud Rennie and Stanley Woodward hadn’t exposed their intentions in the New York Herald Tribune."

== "My Faulkner and My Hemingway": Colleagues in the Bullpen ==
In his elegy-memoir in The American Scholar, veteran journalist and author William Zinsser recalled achieving his "boyhood dream" after World War II service when he joined the Herald Tribune sports department as an assistant editor. "It was in those pages, as a child baseball addict, that I found my first literary influences," Zinsser declared. "The Trib sportswriters were my Faulkner and my Hemingway, and now I was in the same room with those bylines-come-to-life: Rud Rennie, Jesse Abramson, Al Laney….sports editor Stanley Woodward, Red Smith, Joe H. Palmer…." Rennie and his fellow Trib men on the sports beat were, according to Red Smith, "incomparably the most gifted company ever assembled in one playpen. Gifted, yes, and acerbic, trenchant, iconoclastic and also good."

When, in 1928, the scrappy Yankees fielder Bob Meusel objected to one of Rennie's columns and tried to punch him in a hotel lobby, Rennie's fellow writers of the various New York newspapers came to their colleague's rescue in person, separating them, and in print, they "put the chill" on Meusel, repeating rumors that management had plans to trade Meusel out of New York. Meusel's contract was sold to the Cincinnati Reds after the 1929 season.

Often in his books such as The Boys of Summer (1972), Memories of Summer (1993), The Era, 1947-1957 (1993), and Into My Own (2006), ex-Trib sportswriter Roger Kahn paused to mention (and quote from) Rennie, "a trim, handsome Canadian" who had "lady friends in several National League towns." One such example, quoted often by others, followed the 20-year-old Oklahoman Mickey Mantle's World Series win for the Yankees (their fourth in a row) against the Brooklyn Dodgers in 1952.

Kahn quoted from the interview between Rud Rennie and Mickey Mantle: "Nice Series, young man," said Rud Rennie, who covered the Yankees for the Herald Tribune. "What are you up to now?" "Headin' back to Oklahoma. I got me a job working with the pump crew down in the lead mine." "Work in the mines?" Rennie said. "You're the star of the World Series. You don't have to do that any more." "Yes, I do," Mantle said. "My dad died, you know." "Yes. Sorry, son." "I got seven dependents counting on me." Mantle named three younger brothers, a sister, his mother and his wife, Merlyn. "That's six," Rennie said. "The baby is due in March," Mantle said. Rennie looked grim. "I can handle it," said 20-year-old Mickey Mantle. Then, brightening, "Anyways my father-in-law, Giles Johnson, says he's gonna name the baby ‘Homer.’"

After the National Baseball Hall of Fame and Museum was founded in 1939, celebrating the centennial of baseball, in Cooperstown, New York, Westbrook Pegler, columnist of the Chicago Tribune and the Scripps-Howard and the Hearst syndicates, complained that Cooperstown was studiously ignoring the corps of sports journalists. "Baseball has lived as much by publicity as by prowess," he scolded, "for the glamorizing prose of the working press has kept the business in the public mind in season and out for more than 40 years and clothed it in the appeal of a national institution." If "Babe Ruth's bat and the pants of John McGraw be relics worth treasuring under glass in the Hall of Fame at Cooperstown …then Bill McGeehan's portable typewriter which made McGraw the mastermind is not less sacred." Legendary sports writers worthy of honors at Cooperstown, he said, should include Ring Lardner, Grantland Rice, Damon Runyon, and 12 other writers, including Rud Rennie. "For in baseball," wrote Pegler, "the historians help create the history they write and are of the game itself." None would look "out of place" in the Hall of Fame. Bob Considine, another longtime nationally syndicated columnist and one-time sportswriter for the New York Daily Mirror, bemoaned in a 1969 column the closure of so many of New York City's great newspapers, and the passing of generations of reporters, columnists, editors, and publishers. He especially cited the vanished Herald Tribune and its bullpen of sportswriters, with Rennie as one of the singled out.

== Photography, health, and the later years ==
A lifelong photographer, Rennie's hundreds of surviving snapshot subjects included Gehrig, Babe Ruth, Casey Stengel, Yogi Berra "He doesn’t even look like a Yankee" was Rennie's oft-quoted complaint. Joe DiMaggio, Jackie Robinson, Phil Rizzuto, Joe McCarthy, George Selkirk, Lefty Gomez, Dizzy Dean, Jacob Ruppert, Tommy Henrich, Rogers Hornsby, Grantland Rice, Hank Greenberg, Pee Wee Reese, Leo Durocher, Red Smith, Al Huggins, Jim Kahn, and numerous others in action including spring training in Florida and a year's Series.. His family photo albums cover more than 50 years of activities in New York, Southampton, Florida, New Orleans, St. Louis, Mexico, Cuba, and the Dominican Republic. He kept detailed notes as to camera, film, exposure, and shutter speed.

Rud Rennie suffered a heart attack during the Yankees’ Spring Training in 1952, returning to baseball coverage after recuperation. His wife Cecilia died in 1954, by which time Rennie's own condition of heart failure necessitated an end to the travel routine following the Yankees. He then covered thoroughbred horse racing in New York.

Rud Rennie died in Huntington, New York on October 6, 1956, aged 59. Sportswriter colleagues attended his funeral. He was buried as a veteran at Long Island National Cemetery in Farmingdale, New York.
