= Joe DiMaggio: The Hero's Life =

Biography of Joe DiMaggio by Richard Ben Cramer

- Author: Richard Ben Cramer
- Language: English
- Subject: Joe DiMaggio
- Genre: Biography; Baseball history
- Publisher: Simon & Schuster
- Publication date: 2000
- Publication place: United States
- ISBN: 978-0684865478

Joe DiMaggio: The Hero's Life is a non-fiction book by a journalist and author Richard Ben Cramer. The book, published in 2000 by Simon & Schuster, covered the life of Joe DiMaggio, Hall of Fame centerfielder for the New York Yankees, and his place in American and baseball history.

The book attracted controversy due to how it painted DiMaggio, a beloved American icon, as being aloof and cold. It became a New York Times bestseller and was nominated for both the CASEY Award and the Seymour Medal as the best baseball book of the year.

== Background ==
Cramer, a New York Yankees fan, wanted to write about DiMaggio in a humanizing way, to cut through the myth and image of the baseball and American icon which he had carefully crafted.

== Reception ==
Upon its release, the book caused controversy and furor amongst baseball fans as it was perceived to have painted DiMaggio in bad light. Cramer disagreed with the characterization, calling the book "positive" to baseball icon. Despite the controversy, the book was critically acclaimed and became a best-seller. It was nominated for the CASEY Award and the Seymour Medal.

The New York Times called the book a "dismantling of both the DiMaggio and the American myths" and praised Cramer's prose. Historian Ron Kaplan also praised Cramer for his extensive research and honesty: "Cramer has done a marvelous, exhaustive job of research, spending five years on his tome... the long-anticipated biography of the Yankee Clipper could not, would not, have been written 30 years ago."

In 2021, the Society for American Baseball Research (SABR) named it one of its top 50 best baseball books during its 50th anniversary celebrations, writing: "If Frank Deford's Everybody's All-American is the best fictional account of the effects of sports superstardom on a man’s life, then this biography is the most vivid depiction of its impact on an actual professional athlete. Through seven decades, [Cramer] chronicles DiMaggio's efforts to maintain personal dignity on his own terms. While fame seemed to exaggerate many shortcomings, the book reveals his genuine and common human decency."
