= The Last Boy =

Biography of Mickey Mantle by Jane Leavy

The Last Boy: Mickey Mantle and the End of America's Childhood
- Author: Jane Leavy
- Language: English
- Subject: Mickey Mantle
- Genre: Biography; Sports history
- Publisher: HarperCollins
- Publication date: 2010
- Publication place: United States
- ISBN: 978-0-06-088352-2

The Last Boy: Mickey Mantle and the End of America's Childhood is a non-fiction book by sportswriter Jane Leavy. Published by HarperCollins in 2010, the book chronicles the personal struggles of Hall of Famer Mickey Mantle, who played his entire career with the New York Yankees, including his struggle with coming to terms with his stardom and his alcoholism as well as its effects on his career and family.

The book was well received and became a New York Times best-seller. It was nominated for the CASEY Award and the Seymour Medal for the best baseball book of the year.

== Background ==
For the book, Leavy interviewed Mantle's teammates and opponents, as well as his two surviving sons and wife, Merlyn Mantle. In total, she spoke to over 500 people. She wrote about Mantle's upbringing in Commerce, Oklahoma and the sexual abuse he endured at the hands of his older half-sister, his relationship with his domineering father, and his struggle with alcoholism and celebrity and his off-field activities as a player. Leavy also wrote about Mantle's extensive injuries and how he played through pain for majority of his career.

Leavy, who was a fan of the Yankees and particularly of Mantle's, structured the book around a series of interviews she did with him in 1983, while she was a sportswriter for The Washington Post. She notably wrote about Mantle inappropriately feeling up her leg before passing out drunk in her lap and then later apologizing and giving her his sweater during a cold morning while he was golfing.

== Reception ==
- "Jane Leavy captures the beautiful, imperfect Mickey Mantle with equal measures of depth and empathy. She finds the buried answers to the riddle of what drove and haunted The Mick." – David Maraniss
- "The only thing about this book that is better than Jane Leavy’s vivid prose is her astonishing reporting. To my knowledge, no one has ever investigated the life of an American athlete with Leavy’s rigor and thoroughness.The Last Boy is as exceptional as Mickey Mantle’s extraordinary—and troubling—life" – Daniel Okrent
- "This is one of the best sports biographies I have ever read. Beautifully written and thoroughly researched, it reveals with stunning insight both the talents and the demons that drove Mickey Mantle, bringing him to life as never before." – Doris Kearns Goodwin
