= What It Takes: The Way to the White House =

1992 book by Richard Ben Cramer

- First edition
- Author: Richard Ben Cramer
- Language: English
- Subject: 1988 United States presidential election
- Genre: Non-fiction
- Publisher: Random House
- Publication date: June 23, 1992
- Publication place: United States
- Media type: Print (hardcover and paperback)
- Pages: 1,047
- ISBN: 978-0394562605

What It Takes: The Way to the White House is a nonfiction book about the 1988 United States presidential election written by Richard Ben Cramer and published in 1992. It follows the campaigns of Republicans George Herbert Walker Bush and Bob Dole and Democrats Joe Biden, Michael Dukakis, Dick Gephardt, and Gary Hart.

The bulk of the book covers the early lives and political careers of the candidates, their campaigns leading up to the New Hampshire primary and the primary itself. Cramer spent six years researching and writing What It Takes.

== Reception ==
What it Takes was critically acclaimed and has been frequently cited by political aides and journalists as one of the most influential books ever written about politics. The Cleveland Plain Dealer called it "quite possibly the finest book on presidential politics ever written, combining meticulous reporting and compelling, at times soaringly lyrical, prose", while the San Francisco Chronicle called it "the ultimate insider's book on presidential politics...an unparalleled source book on the 1988 candidates."
