= Neil Lanctot =

American historian and author (born 1966)

- Born: Woonsocket, Rhode Island, U.S.
- Occupations: Historian, author
- Writing career
- Genre: History
- Notable works: Negro League Baseball: The Rise and Ruin of a Black Institution (2004); Campy: The Two Lives of Roy Campanella (2011)
- Website: neillanctot.com

Neil Lanctot (born 1966) is an American historian and author. Two of his books, Negro League Baseball and Campy, were finalists for the Casey Award while the former won the Seymour Medal.

== Early life ==
Lanctot was born in Woonsocket, Rhode Island. He attended the University of Pennsylvania, graduating in 1987 with a B.A. in English. He subsequently earned an M.A. in American History from Temple University in 1992 and a Ph.D. from the University of Delaware in 2002.

== Career ==
Lanctot's first book, Fair Dealing and Clean Playing: The Hilldale Club and the Development of Black Professional Baseball, 1910-1932, was published by McFarland and Company in 1994. In 2007, Syracuse University Press released a paperback edition.

His second book, Negro League Baseball: The Rise and Ruin of a Black Institution, appeared in 2004 and received critical acclaim from numerous publications, including the front cover of the Sunday New York Times Book Review.

The book was hailed by the New York Times as “prodigiously researched" and “enormously important."

In March 2011, his third book, Campy: The Two Lives of Roy Campanella, was published by Simon & Schuster. The book was the first to uncover the true story behind Roy Campanella's near fatal car accident in 1958 and his rocky relationship with Brooklyn Dodger great Jackie Robinson. Campy received positive reviews from the Los Angeles Times, Publishers Weekly, Pittsburgh Post-Gazette, and several other publications upon its release.

In a review by The Washington Independent Review of Books, Bob Luke writes that "Lanctot brings to light a man whose life reached the highest highs and the lowest lows, telling well the story of a remarkable ball player whose career has not had the recognition it deserves. It’s an important story told with ease and authority."

In late 2021, Lanctot’s fourth book, The Approaching Storm, was published by Penguin Random House to critical acclaim. The book explores America's path to involvement in World War I. In April 2022, the American Society of Journalists and Authors selected The Approaching Storm as the best biography of 2021.

== Published works ==
- Fair Dealing and Clean Playing - The Hilldale Club and the Development of Black Professional Baseball, 1910-1932 (1994)
- Negro League Baseball: The Rise and Ruin of a Black Institution (2004)
- Campy: The Two Lives of Roy Campanella (2011)
- The Approaching Storm: Roosevelt, Wilson, Addams, and Their Clash Over America’s Future (2021)

Lanctot's writing has appeared in publications such as Smithsonian Magazine, Chicago Tribune, Philadelphia Inquirer, Baltimore Sun, and several other journals and anthologies.

== Awards ==
- 2005: Seymour Medal (Society for American Baseball Research) for best baseball book, Negro League Baseball
- 2022: Best biography, 2021 - The American Society of Journalists and Authors.
