= List of New York Yankees team records =

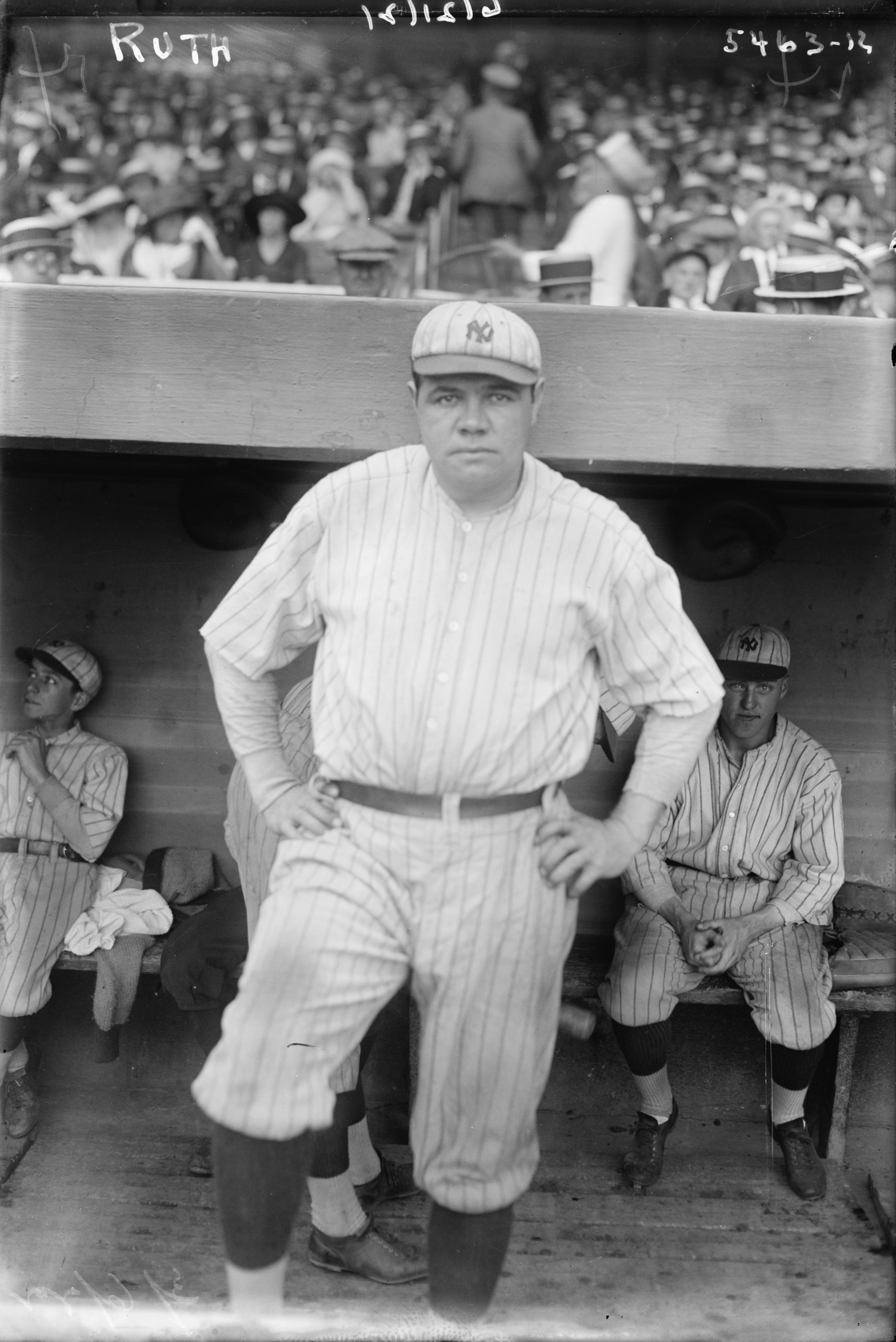
Babe Ruth holds sixteen franchise, four American League, and two Major League records.

The New York Yankees are a professional baseball team based in the Bronx, New York. They compete in the East Division of Major League Baseball's (MLB) American League (AL). The club began play in 1903 as the Highlanders, after owners Frank Farrell and William S. Devery had bought the defunct Baltimore Orioles and moved the team to New York City; in 1913, the team changed its nickname to the Yankees. From 1903 to 2026, the franchise has won more than 10,000 games and 27 World Series championships. The list below documents players and teams that hold particular club records.

Outfielder Babe Ruth holds the most franchise records, with 16, including career home runs, and career and single-season batting average and on-base percentage. Shortstop Derek Jeter has the second-most records among hitters, with eight. Jeter's marks include the records for career hits, singles, doubles, and stolen bases. Among pitchers, Whitey Ford has the most Yankees records with five, all of which are career totals. These include games won, games started, and innings pitched.

Several Yankees hold AL and MLB records. Ruth has MLB single-season records for extra-base hits and total bases, and holds four other AL single-season records. Outfielder Joe DiMaggio had a 56-game hitting streak in the 1941 season, which remains an MLB record. Jack Chesbro holds three AL records that he set in 1904: games won, games started, and complete games. Outfielder Aaron Judge set an AL record with 62 home runs in 2022, beating the mark of 61 that fellow Yankee Roger Maris posted in 1961.

== Table key ==
Table key
#	Tie between two teams
†	American League record
*	Major League record

Statistics are current through the 2026 season.

== Individual career records ==
These are records of players with the best performance in particular statistical categories during their career with the Yankees.

=== Career batting ===
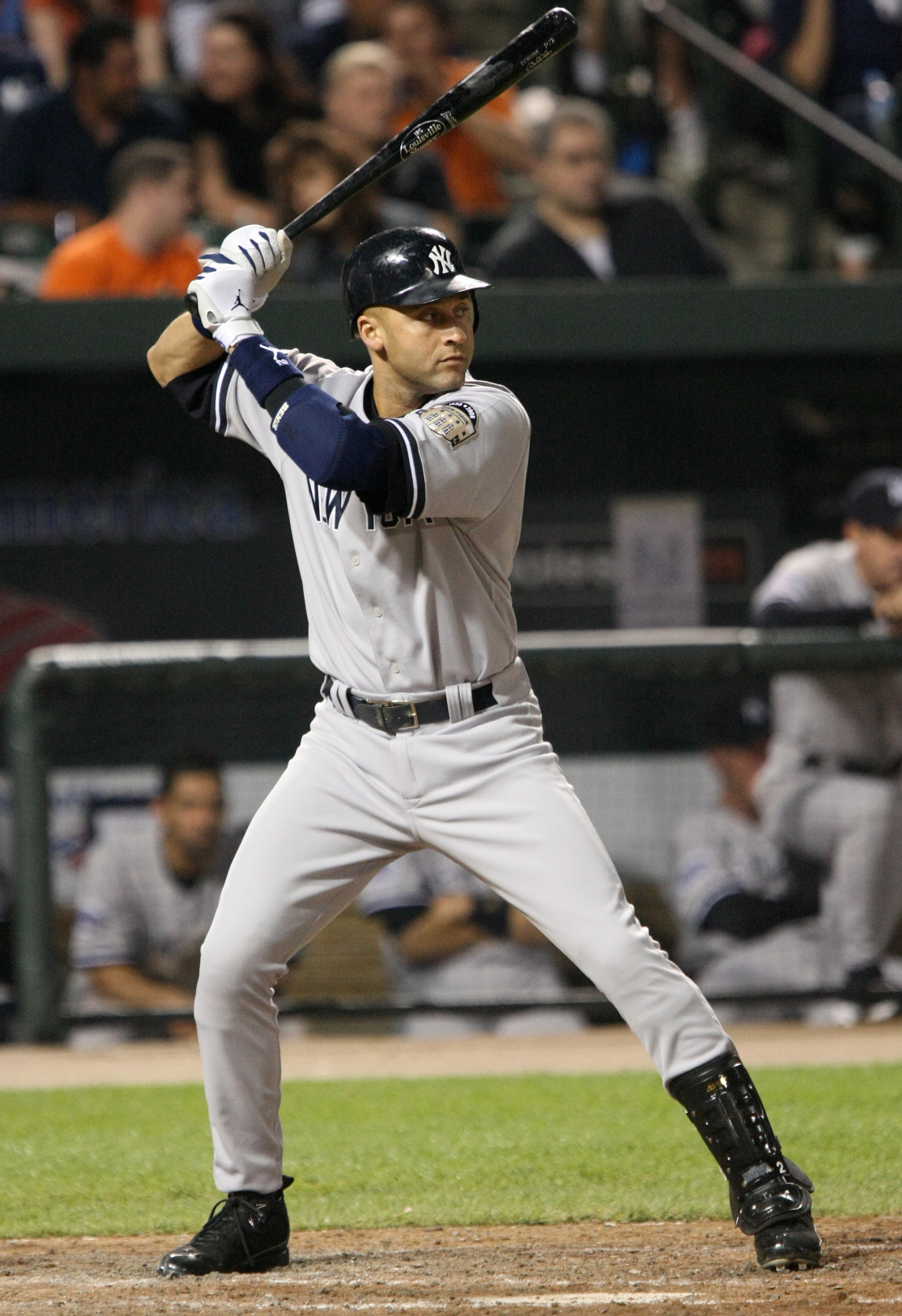
Derek Jeter is the Yankees' all-time leader in hits, singles, doubles, and stolen bases.

Career batting records
Statistic	Player	Record	Yankees career	Ref
Batting average	Babe Ruth	.349	1920–1934	
On-base percentage	Babe Ruth	.484	1920–1934	
Slugging percentage	Babe Ruth	.711	1920–1934	
On-base plus slugging	Babe Ruth	1.195	1920–1934	
Runs	Babe Ruth	1,959	1920–1934	
Plate appearances	Derek Jeter	12,602	1995–2014	
At bats	Derek Jeter	11,195	1995–2014	
Hits	Derek Jeter	3,465	1995–2014	
Total bases	Babe Ruth	5,131	1920–1934	
Singles	Derek Jeter	2,595	1995–2014	
Doubles	Derek Jeter	544	1995–2014	
Triples	Lou Gehrig	163	1923–1939	
Home runs	Babe Ruth	659	1920–1934	
Runs batted in	Lou Gehrig	1,995	1923–1939	
Walks	Babe Ruth	1,852	1920–1934	
Strikeouts	Derek Jeter	1,840	1995–2014	
Stolen bases	Derek Jeter	358	1995–2014	
Games played	Derek Jeter	2,747	1995–2014	

=== Career pitching ===
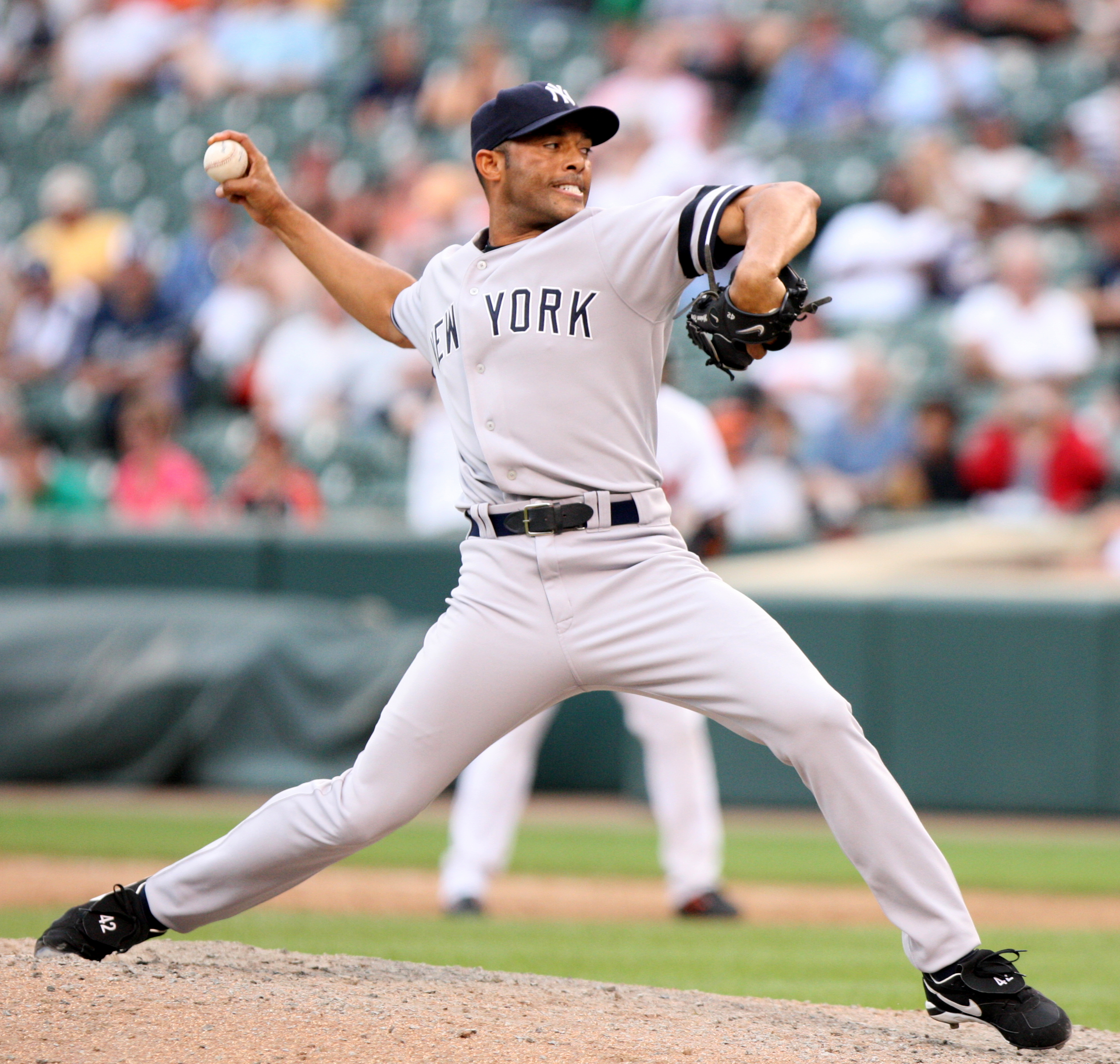
Mariano Rivera has the most saves, both in his career and a single season, among Yankees pitchers.

Career pitching records
Statistic	Player	Record	Yankees career	Ref(s)
Wins	Whitey Ford	236	1950, 1953–1967	
Losses	Mel Stottlemyre	139	1964–1974	
Win–loss percentage	Johnny Allen	.725	1932–1935	
Earned run average^{[a]}	Rich Gossage	2.14	1978–1983, 1989	
Saves	Mariano Rivera	652^{*}	1995–2013	
Strikeouts	Andy Pettitte	2,020	1995–2003, 2007–2010, 2012–2013	
Shutouts	Whitey Ford	45	1950, 1953–1967	
Games	Mariano Rivera	1,115^{†}	1995–2013	
Innings pitched	Whitey Ford	3,170 1/3	1950, 1953–1967	
Games started	Whitey Ford; Andy Pettitte	438	1950, 1953–1967; 1995–2003, 2007–2010, 2012–2013	
Games finished	Mariano Rivera	951^{*}	1995–2013	^{[b]}
Complete games	Red Ruffing	261	1930–1942; 1945–1946	
Walks	Lefty Gomez	1,090	1930–1942	
Hits allowed	Red Ruffing	2,995	1930–1942; 1945–1946	
Wild pitches	Whitey Ford	75	1950, 1953–1967	
Hit batsmen	Jack Warhop	114	1908–1915	

== Individual single-season records ==
These are records of Yankees players with the best performance in particular statistical categories during a single season.

=== Single-season batting ===
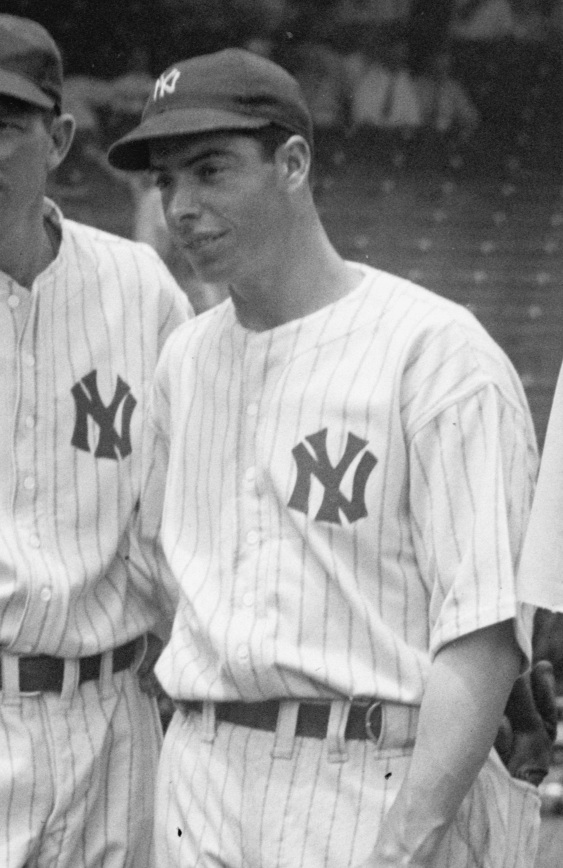
Joe DiMaggio has held the MLB record for the longest hitting streak since 1941.

Single-season batting records
Statistic	Player	Record	Season	Ref(s)
Batting average	Babe Ruth	.393	1923	
Home runs	Aaron Judge	62^{†}	2022	
Runs batted in	Lou Gehrig	185^{†}	1931	
Runs	Babe Ruth	177^{†}	1921	
Hits	Don Mattingly	238	1986	
Singles	Steve Sax	171	1989	
Doubles	Don Mattingly	53	1986	
Triples	Earle Combs	23	1927	
Stolen bases	Rickey Henderson	93	1988	
At bats	Alfonso Soriano	696	2002	
Hitting streak	Joe DiMaggio	56^{*}	1941	
Slugging percentage	Babe Ruth	.847^{†}	1920	
Extra-base hits	Babe Ruth	119^{*}	1921	
Total bases	Babe Ruth	457^{*}	1921	
On-base percentage	Babe Ruth	.545	1923	
On-base plus slugging	Babe Ruth	1.379^{†}	1920	
Walks	Babe Ruth	170^{†}	1923	
Strikeouts	Giancarlo Stanton	211	2018	

=== Single-season pitching ===
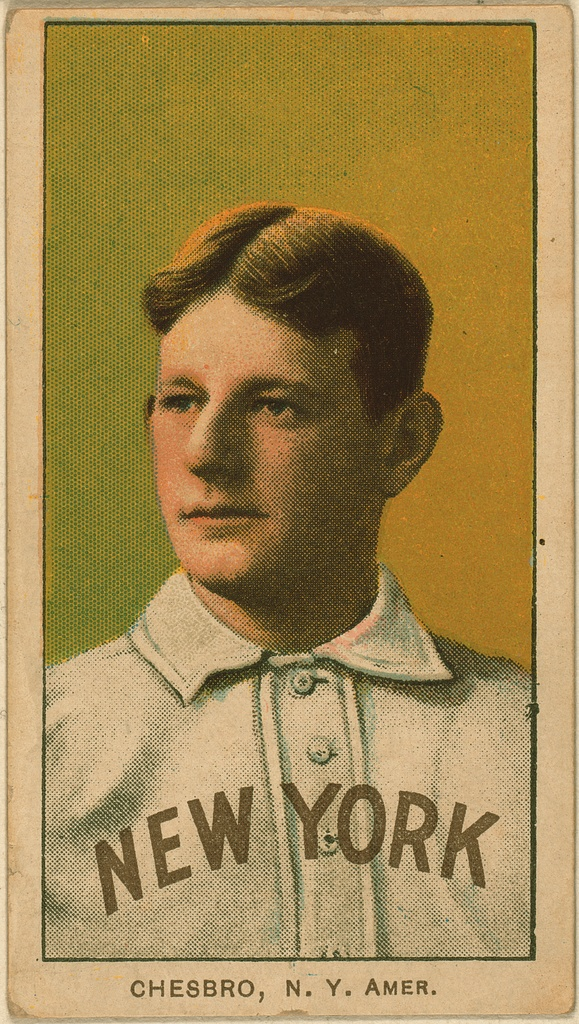
Jack Chesbro won an American League-record 41 games in the 1904 season.

Single-season pitching records
Statistic	Player	Record	Season	Ref(s)
Wins	Jack Chesbro	41^{†}	1904	
Losses	Joe Lake	22	1908	
Strikeouts	Gerrit Cole	257	2022	
Earned run average	Spud Chandler	1.64	1943	
Earned runs allowed	Sam Jones	127	1925	
Hits allowed	Jack Powell	340	1904	
Shutouts	Ron Guidry	9	1978	
Saves	Mariano Rivera	53	2004	
Games	Paul Quantrill	86	2004	
Games started	Jack Chesbro	51^{†}	1904	
Complete games	Jack Chesbro	48^{†}	1904	
Innings pitched	Jack Chesbro	454 2/3	1904	

== Team single-game records ==
These are records of Yankees teams with the best performance in particular statistical categories during a single game.

=== Single-game batting ===
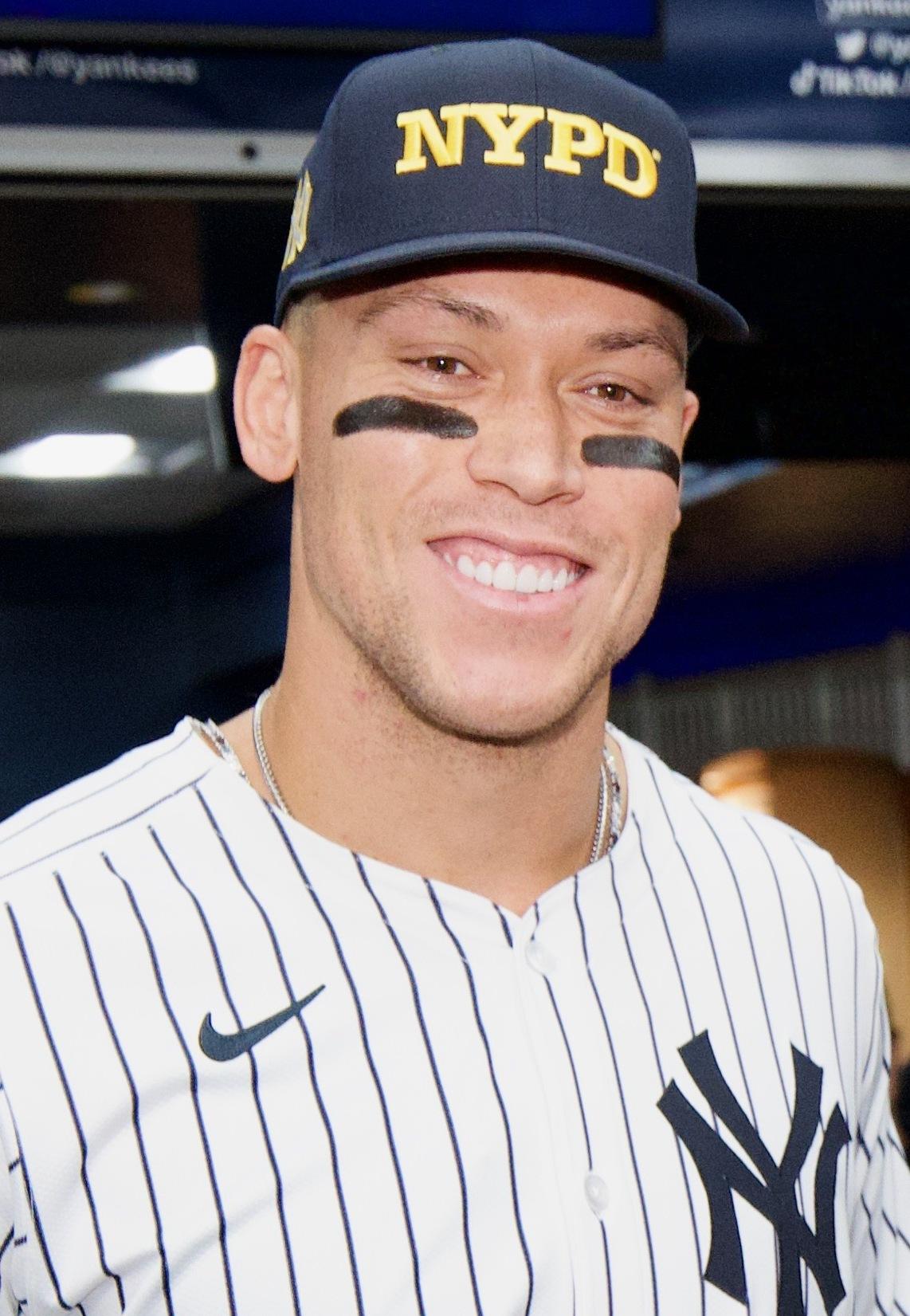
Aaron Judge homered in both games in which the Yankees hit nine home runs, an MLB record.

Single-game batting records
Statistic	Record	Opponent	Date
Home runs hit	9*	Milwaukee Brewers	March 29, 2025
Home runs hit	9*	Tampa Bay Rays	August 19, 2025
Runs scored	25	Philadelphia Athletics	May 24, 1936
Hits	30	Boston Red Sox	September 28, 1923
Doubles	10^{#}	Toronto Blue Jays	April 12, 1988
Doubles	10^{#}	Cincinnati Reds	June 5, 2003
Triples	5	Washington Senators	May 1, 1934
Grand slams	3*	Oakland Athletics	August 25, 2011
Runners left on base	23	Boston Red Sox	September 5, 1927
Strikeouts	22	Chicago Cubs	May 7, 2017
Stolen bases	15	St. Louis Browns	September 28, 1911

=== Single-game pitching ===
Single-game pitching records
Statistic	Record	Opponent	Date
Hits allowed	28	Detroit Tigers	September 29, 1928
Runs allowed	24	Cleveland Indians	July 29, 1928
Home runs allowed	7^{#}	Boston Red Sox	July 4, 2003
Home runs allowed	7^{#}	Cleveland Indians	August 15, 2019
Strikeouts	26	Chicago Cubs	May 7, 2017

=== Other ===
Other single-game records
Statistic	Record	Opponent	Date
Longest game by time	7:00	Detroit Tigers	June 24, 1962

== Team season records ==
These are records of Yankees teams with the best and worst performances in particular statistical categories during a single season.

=== Season batting ===
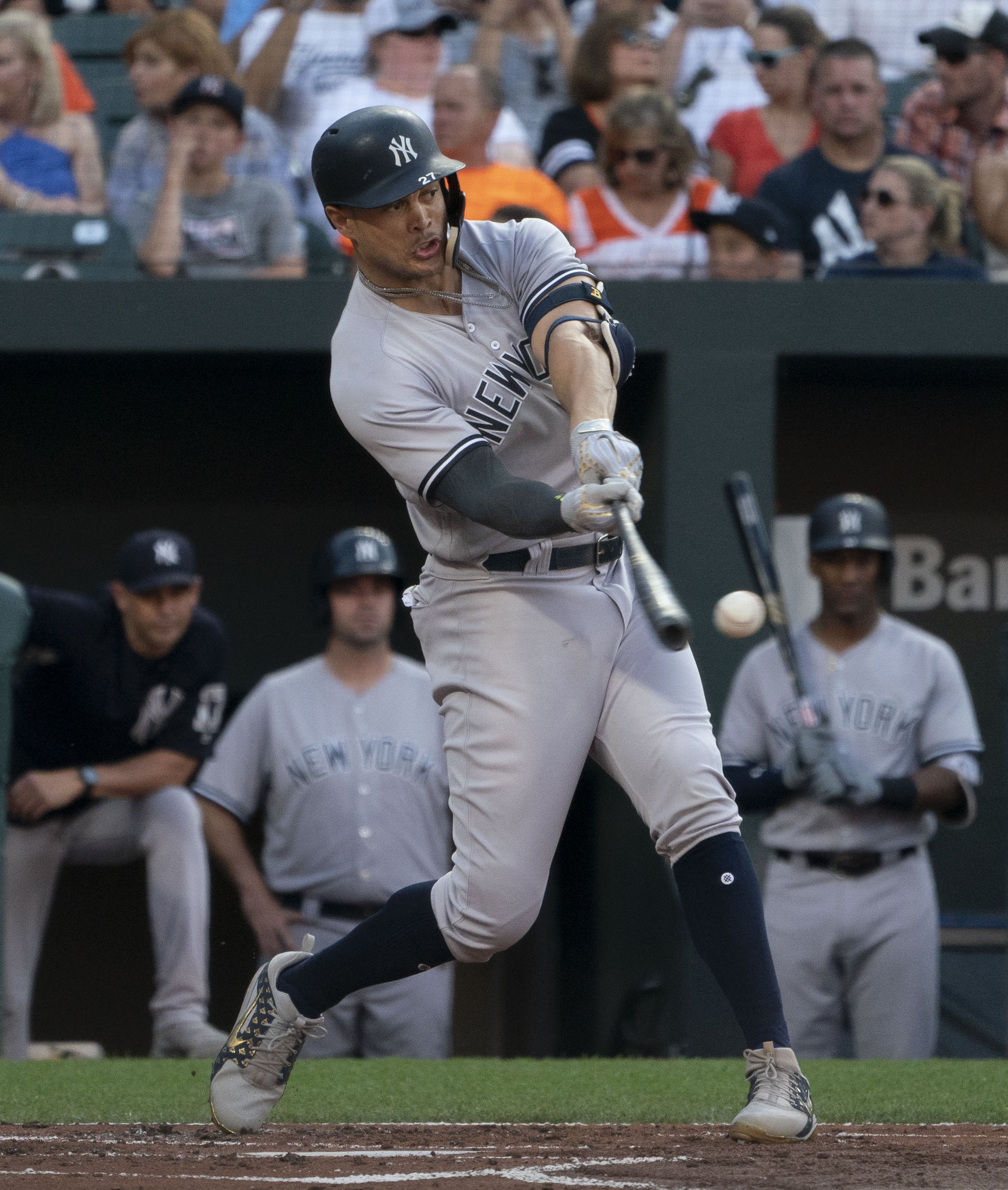
Giancarlo Stanton hit 38 of the Yankees' MLB record 267 home runs in 2018.

Season batting records
Statistic	Record	Season
Home runs	306	2019
Runs	1,067	1931
Hits	1,683	1930
Doubles	327	2006
Triples	110	1930
Total bases	2,703	1936
Runners left on base	1,258	1996
Strikeouts	1,437	2019
Stolen bases	289	1910

=== Season pitching ===
Season pitching records
Statistic	Record	Season
Hits allowed	1,566	1930
Runs allowed	898	1930
Home runs allowed	248	2019
Strikeouts	1,634	2018
Shutouts	24	1951

== Team all-time records ==
Team all-time records
Statistic	Record
Home runs	17,738
Runs	93,949
Hits	174,679
Batting average	.265
Earned run average	3.65
Runs allowed	80,598

== See also ==
- Baseball statistics
- New York Yankees award winners and league leaders

== Notes ==
- ^{a} Earned run average is calculated as 9 × (ER ÷ IP), where $ER$ is earned runs and $IP$ is innings pitched.
- ^{b} The figure listed is the MLB total. Baseball-Reference.com credits Rivera with 952 games finished.
