= Dan Daniel (sportswriter) =

American sportswriter

- Daniel, c. 1920
- Born: Daniel Margowitz; June 6, 1890; Springfield, Massachusetts, U.S.
- Died: July 1, 1981 (aged 91); Pompano Beach, Florida, U.S.
- Education: City College of New York
- Occupation: Sportswriter
- Awards: J. G. Taylor Spink Award (1972)

Dan Daniel (June 6, 1890 – July 1, 1981), born Daniel Margowitz, (Note: Other sources give his birth name as Daniel Markowitz.) was an American sportswriter whose contributions over a long period led him to be called "the dean of American baseball writers".

== Early life ==
Daniel was born in Springfield, Massachusetts. His family moved to New York City when he was a boy, and he remained there throughout his career. He attended the City College of New York, where he managed the basketball team.

Daniel received his first writing assignment with the New York Herald in 1909 at the age of 19. He decided to use a single-name byline, "By Daniel", because editors in the early 20th century were concerned that anti-Semitism would hurt newspaper sales if he used his Jewish surname.

== 1920s ==
By 1924, Daniel had settled at the New York Telegram, where he remained for the next forty years. In 1925, he won Best Story of the Year from the Baseball Writers' Association of America for his portrayal of Walter Johnson's loss in Game 7 of the Washington Senators/Pittsburgh Pirates World Series match-up.

In the early 1920s, Daniel helped start The Ring with Nat Fleischer. He was a prolific contributor and editor throughout The Ring's history and could be seen behind his desk at The Ring when he was well past the age of 80.

In addition to his daily columns for the New York Telegram (later World Telegram then World Telegram and Sun), Daniel wrote weekly columns for The Sporting News, contributing more words to that publication than any other writer in its history.

== 1930s ==
From 1930 through the 1960s, Daniel was a frequent contributor to Baseball Magazine and SPORT, along with other sporting publications of the day. His patriotic articles during World War II earned him wide praise. He was one of the first writers to identify the potential of both Joe DiMaggio and Mickey Mantle, extolling their virtues before either had swung a major league bat.

In 1930, Daniel was elected president of the New York chapter of the Baseball Writers' Association of America. That year, New York Mayor Jimmy Walker made Daniel sports chairman of his Committee for Relief of the Unemployed. The committee organized the first college basketball games in Madison Square Garden and raised the equivalent of 5 million dollars between 1930 and 1933. Walker presented a citation to Daniel at a testimonial dinner held in his honor, the first time a private citizen had been so-honored by the city.

Also in 1930, Daniel helped convince Babe Ruth to sign his record US$80,000 contract with the New York Yankees. Ruth had been holding out for more money and had threatened to boycott spring training in Saint Petersburg, Florida. Daniel helped Ruth come to the decision to sign by reminding him that many of his fans were out of work and selling apples on street corners back home in New York City.

Later in 1930, Daniel published Babe Ruth, Idol of the American Boy. This early biography of The Babe was developed from material Daniel had published in a series of feature stories in the New York Telegram. It included a foreword to boys from The Babe admonishing them to "do everything in moderation"!

== 1940s ==
Starting in the 1940s, his "Ask Daniel" column ran in the World Telegram every Tuesday. Daniel answered thousands of baseball questions, becoming one of the game's leading experts and historians. Each spring, Daniel put his reputation on the line by predicting how the eight teams in each league would finish. Cartoonist Willard Mullin captured the audacity of these predictions in charming caricatures.

Daniel was an accomplished speaker and raconteur. He had a rasping voice and a biting wit, which made him a popular choice as master of ceremonies for sports dinners and roasts.

Daniel was official scorer for more than twenty games during Joe DiMaggio's 1941 hitting streak. His decisions are still criticized more than 70 years later, but Daniel maintained throughout his life that he called each play as he saw it.

Shortly after Babe Ruth's death in 1948, Daniel wrote The Real Babe Ruth, his second biography of the Babe, which contained many of his personal recollections from having been friend and advisor to Babe Ruth.

Daniel served as president of the Baseball Writers' Association of America (BBWAA), chairman of the Football Writers' Association, and chairman of the Boxing Writers' Association.

== Later life ==
In 1972, Daniel received the J. G. Taylor Spink Award from the BBWAA, baseball's highest honor for a writer. In his speech during ceremonies at the National Baseball Hall of Fame, he thanked the players and the fans for "giving him the medium of a wonderful career". He mused that without baseball, he would have ended up as a doctor and assured the audience that "Had I been a doctor, I would have made house-calls".

At the age of 86, Daniel was still a relevant contributor to the history of New York City sports. In 1976, he co-authored "Yankee Stadium Then and Now", a feature article in The New York Times.

Daniel was a noted bibliophile and amassed a significant collection of first editions, befriending book sellers in the cities he frequented as he traveled with the Yankees and other teams. His collection included an imprint of Aristotle's Art of Rhetoric, published by Gunther Zainer in 1476.

Daniel died on July 1, 1981, in Pompano Beach, Florida, at the age of 91.
