= Richard Ben Cramer =

American journalist, author, and screenwriter

- Born: June 12, 1950; Rochester, New York, U.S.
- Died: January 7, 2013 (aged 62); Baltimore, Maryland, U.S.
- Education: Johns Hopkins University; Columbia University Graduate School of Journalism
- Occupations: Journalist; Author; Screenwriter
- Spouses: Carolyn White (divorced); Joan Smith
- Children: 1

Richard Ben Cramer (June 12, 1950 – January 7, 2013) was an American journalist, author, and screenwriter. He was awarded a Pulitzer Prize for International Reporting in 1979 for his coverage of the Middle East.

== Biography ==
Cramer was born and raised in Rochester, New York, the son of Brud and Blossom Cramer. He graduated from Brighton High School in 1967. He wrote for Trapezoid, the school's student newspaper, after he was cut from the baseball team. He earned a bachelor's degree in liberal arts in 1971 from Johns Hopkins University where he was also a writer and editor for The Johns Hopkins News-Letter. Unable to land a job at The Baltimore Sun, he instead attended the Columbia University Graduate School of Journalism where he received a master's degree one year later in 1972.

Cramer worked as a journalist at several publications, including The Philadelphia Inquirer, The Baltimore Sun, Esquire Magazine, and Rolling Stone. He won a Pulitzer Prize for International Reporting in 1979 for his coverage of the Middle East as a foreign correspondent for The Philadelphia Inquirer and was a finalist for the same Prize in 1981. His work as a political reporter culminated in What It Takes: The Way to the White House, an account of the 1988 presidential election that is considered one of the seminal journalistic studies of presidential electoral politics. His next book, Joe DiMaggio: The Hero's Life, was a New York Times bestseller in 2000. He was an avid New York Yankees fan and lived on the Eastern Shore of Maryland. His final published book was How Israel Lost: The Four Questions, about the ways in which the Israeli occupation has corrupted the country's original vision.

Cramer wrote and narrated several well-known documentary films, often in collaboration with filmmaker Thomas Lennon: The Choice '92 (PBS Frontline, 1992), Tabloid Truth (PBS Frontline, 1994) and The Battle Over Citizen Kane (PBS The American Experience, 1995), which premiered at Sundance Film Festival and was nominated for an Academy Award. He co-wrote and narrated a film about Joe DiMaggio, The Hero's Life, produced by long-time collaborator Mark Zwonitzer, based on Cramer's book. He contributed to the scripts of two PBS series, The Irish in America: Long Journey Home (1998), and The Supreme Court (2007).

Richard Ben Cramer died at Johns Hopkins Hospital in Baltimore of complications from lung cancer on January 7, 2013, at age 62. Cramer lived in Chestertown, Maryland, with his second wife, Joan. Besides his wife he is survived by a daughter, Ruby, from his first marriage to Carolyn White.

== Books ==
- Ted Williams: The Seasons of the Kid (1991)
- What It Takes: The Way to the White House (1992)
- Bob Dole (1994)
- Joe DiMaggio: The Hero's Life (2000)
- What Do You Think of Ted Williams Now? A Remembrance (2002)
- How Israel Lost: The Four Questions (2004)
