= Christy Walsh (sports agent) =

American sports agent

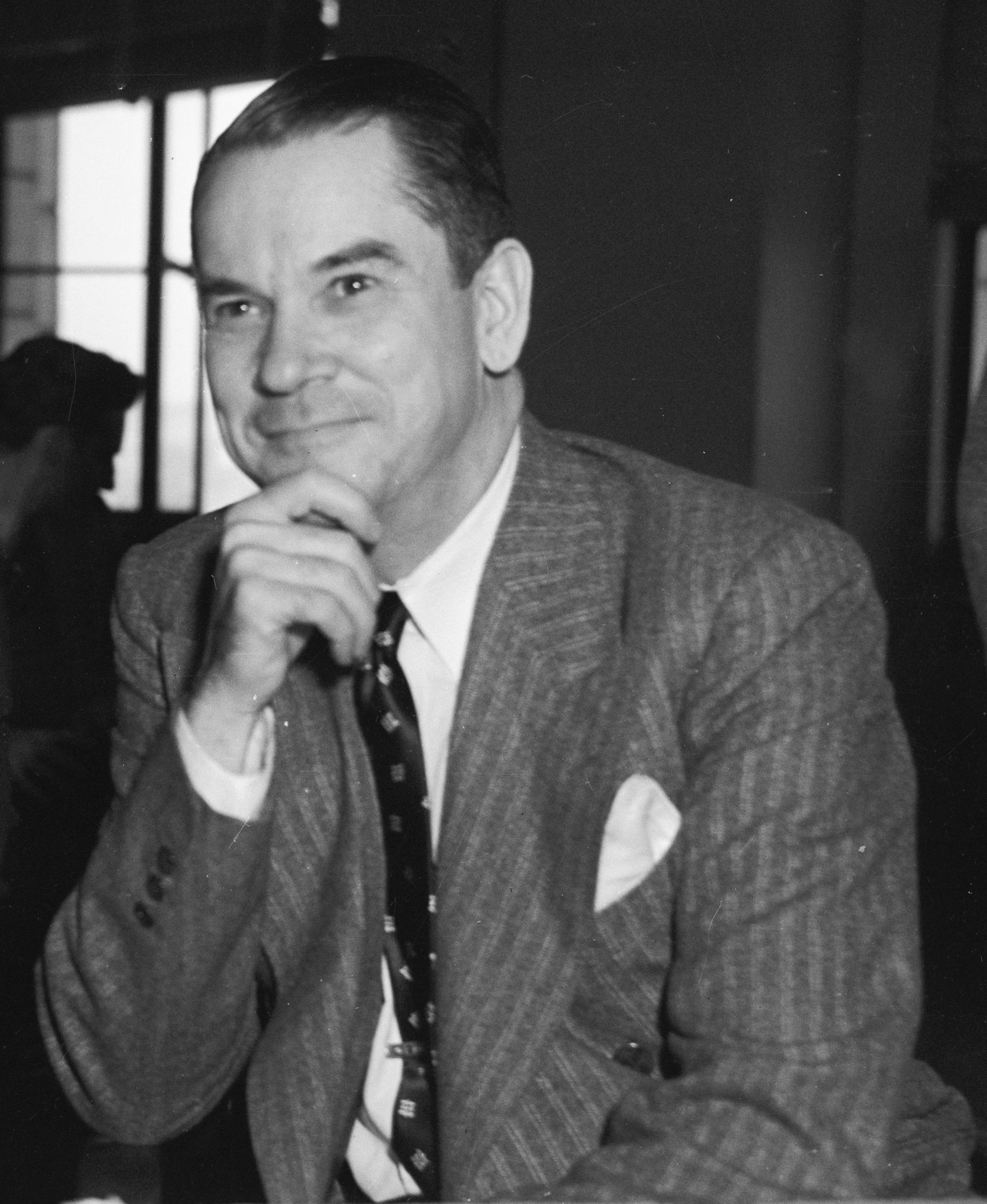
- Walsh, c. 1936
- Born: December 2, 1891; St. Louis, Missouri, U.S.
- Died: December 29, 1955 (aged 64); Los Angeles, California
- Education: St. Vincent's College
- Occupations: Sports agent, writer
- Known for: Agent for baseball players, notably Babe Ruth

Walter "Christy" Walsh (December 2, 1891 – December 29, 1955) was an American writer, cartoonist, and sports agent. He is best known for acting as Knute Rockne and Babe Ruth's agent, and is considered to be the first sports agent in baseball.

== Early career ==
Walsh graduated from St. Vincent's College in Los Angeles, California in 1911. Walsh was trained as a lawyer, but began his career with the Los Angeles Herald as a reporter and cartoonist. He began working as a ghostwriter in 1912 when he interviewed Christy Mathewson while Mathewson was vacationing in California.

In 1921, Walsh ghostwrote an article for World War I flying ace Eddie Rickenbacker in which he described the 1921 Indianapolis 500. Walsh and Rickenbacker split the profits of approximately $800.

Walsh later moved to New York City and was hired by Maxwell-Chalmers Automobiles in advertising. After being fired, he decided to ghostwrite for athletes full-time.

== Ghostwriting syndicate and later career ==
Between 1921 and 1938, Walsh built and ran a successful ghostwriting syndicate of thirty-four baseball writers. His writers included Ford C. Frick, Damon Runyon, Bozeman Bulger, and Gene Fowler, among others. Walsh's writers earned $100,000 between 1921 and 1936, and grossed $43,000 in their peak year of 1929.

The players Walsh represented included Ruth, Ty Cobb, Dizzy Dean, Rogers Hornsby, John McGraw, Walter Johnson, and Lou Gehrig. Walsh went to great lengths to sign clients. Besides becoming a delivery boy to meet Ruth, Walsh pursued Walter Johnson into the Pullman's washroom in New Haven, Connecticut. Johnson was paid $1,000, and eventually made $7,000.

In 1931 Walsh was hired to write and narrate three short films for Universal Pictures to be called "The Christy Walsh All American Sports Reel". The films were to feature Knute Rockne. The first short film produced, Various Shifts (1931), was a visit with Walsh and Rockne at Notre Dame as Rockne and the Notre Dame football team demonstrated various football shifts. The second short film was Carry On (1931), with Walsh as narrator mourning the death of Rockne who died in a plane crash in March 1931.

In 1939 Walsh served as sports director for the New York World's Fair.

In 1945 Walsh was Associate Producer for a 20th Century Fox feature film about Eddie Rickenbacker. Captain Eddie was released on June 19, 1945, and starred Fred MacMurray as Captain Eddie Rickenbacker, and also featured Charles Bickford, Lynn Bari, Lloyd Nolan and Spring Byington.

When Ruth died in August 1948, Walsh was named one of the 57 honorary pallbearers at his funeral which was held in St. Patrick's Cathedral in New York City.

== Personal life and death ==
Christy Walsh was born in St. Louis, Missouri, on December 2, 1891. Christy was his mother's maiden name. On April 4, 1935, he married Madeline Souden. The couple had only one child, Christy Jr., and their marriage ended in divorce. Walsh was also the father-in-law of Peggy Cobb, the stepdaughter of Robert Cobb, the owner of the famous Brown Derby Restaurant.

Walsh died on December 14, 1955, in Los Angeles, California. At the time, he was living in the neighborhood of North Hollywood. He was married to Margaret Merritt, whom he met during the World's Fair.
