= Allen Barra =

American journalist and author

Allen Barra is an American journalist and author, principally of sports books. He has also written extensively about Wyatt Earp; Richard E. Nicholls (literary editor of The American Scholar), in a review of Barra's book on Earp in The New York Times, described it as a "well-researched, provocative study of the man and his legend".

Barra is a contributing editor of American Heritage magazine, and regularly writes about sports for The Wall Street Journal and The Atlantic. He has also written for The New York Times and The New York Observer, and was formerly a columnist for Salon. He has contributed to both the print and online versions of The Village Voice, where he formerly blogged on sports. He frequently contributes to Major League Baseball Radio and The Daily Beast.

== Personal ==
Barra, grew up in Birmingham, Alabama, attended the University of Alabama at Birmingham, and currently lives in South Orange, New Jersey.

== Publications ==
Barra's book on Wyatt Earp has played a significant role in unwrapping the many fabricated biographies obscuring the real Earp.

His 2009 book Yogi Berra: Eternal Yankee was praised as "sturdy," "well-written," and "thorough" by the San Francisco Chronicle, but The New York Times thought it too enthralled with its subject.

In 2010, Barra wrote Rickwood Field: A Century in America's Oldest Ballpark.

== Perception ==
Barra was one of the few sportswriters to agree with Rush Limbaugh that Donovan McNabb had been overrated by sports journalists due to reasons related to McNabb's race.

In 2009, he was the target of a widely read critique at the website Deadspin, which targeted Barra's subjective adoration for Derek Jeter. Barra then responded, five years later, in an article for Salon, that his argument was based on the premise that Jeter contributes in "ways that don’t necessarily show up in a box score," rather than his argument from the piece that, "many observers think the primary reason (for the Yankees' success in 2009) is Mr. Jeter," rather than giving credit to the achievements of the team as a whole (six other members of the starting lineup had an OPS over 120+).
