= Casey Award =

Annual literature award

CASEY Award
- Awarded for: Best baseball literary work
- Presented by: Spitball: The Literary Baseball Magazine
- First award: 1983
- Most recent winner: Kevin Baker; The New York Game: Baseball and the Rise of a New City (2024)
- Website: spitballmag.com

The Casey Award (stylized as CASEY) is an annual literary award that has been given to the best baseball book of the year since 1983. The award was created by Mike Shannon and W. J. Harrison, editors and co-founders of Spitball: The Literary Baseball Magazine because, up until then, there was no award given to authors and publishers of distinguished baseball literature; it is considered to be the most prestigious award that can be given to a baseball book.

== Award process ==
Baseball books, both non-fiction and fiction, are nominated by a panel of three judges under five main criteria: literary quality, informational content, analytical content, originality, and artistic appeal. After a shortlist is finalized, the judges vote on the book which has given "the greatest contribution to baseball literature". It is then presented at the annual CASEY Award Banquet held in Cincinnati, Ohio in January.

Previously, the winner received a bronze plaque which manufactured by the Newman Brothers Company in Cincinnati and featured Nap Lajoie holding a quill, the original logo of the award which was designed by magazine's first art director, Blair Gibeau. In 2009, the bronze plaques were replaced by authentic Louisville Slugger baseball bats imprinted with a new CASEY Award logo designed by the magazine's second art director and longtime cover artist Donnie Pollard.

== Winners and finalists ==
=== 1980s ===
Year	Author(s)	Book	Result
1983	Eric Rolfe Greenberg	The Celebrant	Winner
1983	Jules Tygiel	Baseball's Great Experiment: Jackie Robinson and His Legacy	Finalist
1983	Harry Stein	Hoopla	Finalist
1983	Donn Rogosin	Invisible Men: Life in Baseball's Negro Leagues	Finalist
1983	L. Robert Davids	Insider's Baseball: The Finer Points of the Game, as Examined by the Society for American Baseball Research	Finalist
1983	Lowell Reidenbaugh	Take Me Out to the Ballpark	Finalist
1983	Richard Lindberg	Who's on 3rd? The Chicago White Sox Story	Finalist
1984	Peter Golenbock	Bums: An Oral History of the Brooklyn Dodgers	Winner
1984	Walter Iooss & Roger Angell	Baseball	Finalist
1984	Kevin Kerrane	Dollar Sign on the Muscle	Finalist
1984	Eugene C. Murdock	Might Casey: All American	Finalist
1984	Robert Creamer	Casey Stengel: His Life and Times	Finalist
1984	Charles Alexander	Ty Cobb	Finalist
1985	Roger Kahn	Good Enough to Dream	Winner
1985	John Thorn	The Armchair Book of Baseball	Finalist
1985	Don Olson	Bambi's Bombers: The First Time Around	Finalist
1985	Daniel Okrent	Nine Innings: The Anatomy of Baseball as Seen Through the Playing of a Single Game	Finalist
1985	Dave Masterson & Timm Boyle	Baseball's Best: The MVPs	Finalist
1985	Donald Hall	Fathers Playing Catch with Sons	Finalist
1985	Donald Honig	Baseball America: The Heroes of the Game and the Times of Their Glory	Finalist
1985	W. P. Kinsella	The Thrill of the Grass	Finalist
1985	None	Topps Baseball Cards	Finalist
1986	Bill James	The Bill James Historical Baseball Abstract	Winner
1986	Myron J. Smith, Jr.	Baseball: A Comprehensive Bibliography	Finalist
1986	Terry Pluto & Jeffrey Neuman	A Baseball Winter: The Off-Season Life of the Summer Game	Finalist
1986	Tony Ardizzone	Heart of the Order	Finalist
1986	W. P. Kinsella	The Iowa Baseball Confederacy	Finalist
1986	Jack B. Moore	Joe DiMaggio: A Bio-Bibliography	Finalist
1986	Roger Kahn	Joe & Marilyn: A Memory of Love	Finalist
1986	David Falkner	The Short Season: The Hard Work and High Times of Baseball in the Spring	Finalist
1987	Peter H. Gordon	Diamonds Are Forever: Artists and Writers on Baseball	Winner
1987	Bowie Kuhn & Marty Appel	Hardball: The Education of a Baseball Commissioner	Finalist
1987	George Plimpton	The Curious Case of Sidd Finch	Finalist
1987	John Thorn & John Holway	The Pitcher	Finalist
1987	David Q. Voigt	Baseball: An Illustrated History	Finalist
1987	Charles Einstein	The Fireside Book of Baseball, Vol. 4	Finalist
1987	Tony Kubek & Terry Pluto	Sixty-One: The Team, The Record, The Men	Finalist
1987	Neil Sullivan	The Dodgers Move West	Finalist
1987	Joe Coomer	A Flatland Fable	Finalist
1987	Curt Smith	Voices of the Game: The First Full-Scale Overview of Baseball Broadcasting, 1921 to the Present	Finalist
1988	John Holway	Blackball Stars: Negro League Pioneers	Winner
1988	Roger Angell	Season Ticket: A Baseball Companion	Finalist
1988	Lonnie Wheeler	Bleachers: A Summer in Wrigley Field	Finalist
1988	Charles Alexander	John McGraw	Finalist
1988	Dorothy Ruth	My Dad, the Babe	Finalist
1988	W. P. Kinsella	The Further Adventures of Slugger McBatt	Finalist
1988	Noel Hynd	The Giants of the Polo Grounds	Finalist
1988	Lonnie Wheeler & John Baskin	The Cincinnati Game	Finalist
1988	Gerald Astor	The Baseball Hall of Fame 50th Anniversary Book	Finalist
1988	Dave Winfield & Tom Parker	Winfield: A Player's Life	Finalist
1989	Mike Sowell	The Pitch That Killed: Carl Mays, Ray Chapman and the Pennant Race of 1920	Winner
1989	Lawrence Ritter & Mark Rucker	The Babe: A Life in Pictures	Finalist
1989	Mike Bryan	Baseball Lives: Men and Women of the Game Talk About Their Jobs, Their Lives, and the National Pastime	Finalist
1989	Joel Zoss & John Bowman	Diamonds in the Rough: The Untold History of Baseball	Finalist
1989	Paul Dickson	The Dickson Baseball Dictionary	Finalist
1989	John Krich	El Beisbol	Finalist
1989	Hank Greenberg & Ira Berkow	Hank Greenberg: The Story of My Life	Finalist
1989	Thomas Boswell	The Heart of the Order	Finalist
1989	Robert Whiting	You Gotta Have Wa	Finalist
1989	John Thorn	Total Baseball	Finalist

=== 1990s ===
Year	Author(s)	Book	Result
1990	Dorothy Seymour Mills & Harold Seymour	Baseball: The People's Game	Winner
1990	Shelly M. Dinhofer	The Art of Baseball: America's Game in Painting, Folk Art and Photography	Finalist
1990	Mike Shatzkin	The Ballplayers: Baseball's Ultimate Biographical Reference	Finalist
1990	James E. Miller	The Baseball Business: Pursuing Pennants and Profits in Baltimore	Finalist
1990	William Curran	Big Sticks: The Batting Revolution of the Twenties	Finalist
1990	Michael Sokolove	Hustle: The Myth, Life, and Lies of Pete Rose	Finalist
1990	Darryl Brock	If I Never Get Back	Finalist
1990	George Will	Men at Work: The Craft of Baseball	Finalist
1990	Mark Winegardner	Prophet of the Sandlots: Journeys With A Major League Scout	Finalist
1991	Bruce Kuklick	To Every Thing a Season: Shibe Park and Urban Philadelphia, 1909-1976	Winner
1991	Andy McCue	Baseball by the Books	Finalist
1991	Henry Aaron & Lonnie Wheeler	I Had A Hammer: The Hank Aaron Story	Finalist
1991	Marc Okkonen	Baseball Uniforms of the 20th Century	Finalist
1991	Brendan Boyd	Blue Ruin: A Novel of the 1919 World Series	Finalist
1991	Jerry Lansche	Glory Fades Away: The Nineteenth-Century World Series Remembered	Finalist
1991	David Lamb	Stolen Season: A Journey Through America and Baseball's Minor Leagues	Finalist
1991	Dick Johnson & Glenn Stout	Ted Williams: A Portrait in Words and Pictures	Finalist
1991	None	Tales of the Diamond: Gems of Baseball Fiction	Finalist
1991	None	Nolan Ryan: The Authorized Pictorial History	Finalist
1992	Phil S. Dixon & Patrick J. Hannigan	The Negro Baseball Leagues: A Photographic History	Winner
1992	Bruce Chadwick	When the Game Was Black & White: The Illustrated Story of Baseball's Negro Leagues	Finalist
1992	David James Duncan	The Brothers K	Finalist
1992	Robert Gregory	Diz: The Story of Dizzy Dean and Baseball During the Great Depression	Finalist
1992	Peter Golenbock	Fenway: An Unexpurgated History of the Boston Red Sox:	Finalist
1992	Lois Browne	The Girls of Summer: In Their Own League	Finalist
1992	Lawrence Ritter	Lost Ballparks: A Celebration of Baseball's Legendary Fields	Finalist
1992	Hal Erickson	Baseball in the Movies: A Comprehensive Reference, 1915-1991	Finalist
1992	Mike Betzold & Ethan Casey	Queen of Diamonds: The Tiger Stadium Story	Finalist
1992	Luke Salisbury	The Cleveland Indian: The Legend of King Saturday	Finalist
1993	Michael Gershman	Diamonds: the Evolution of the Ballpark	Winner
1993	Neal & Constance McCabe	Baseball's Golden Age: The Photos of Charles M. Conlon	Finalist
1993	Ed Linn	Hitter: The Life and Turmoils of Ted Williams	Finalist
1993	Barbara Gregorich	Women at Play: The Story of Women in Baseball	Finalist
1993	Lloyd Johnson	The Encyclopedia of Minor League Baseball	Finalist
1993	Wilfred Sheed	My Life as a Fan: A Memoir	Finalist
1993	Donald Hall	The Museum of Clear Ideas	Finalist
1993	Gerald Eskenazi	The Lip: A Biography of Leo Durocher	Finalist
1993	Bob Edwards	Fridays with Red: A Radio Friendship	Finalist
1993	Rich Westcott & Frank Bilovsky	The New Phillies Encyclopedia	Finalist
1994	John Helyar	Lords of the Realm: The Real History of Baseball	Winner
1994	Bill James	The Politics of Glory: How Baseball's Hall of Fame Really Works	Finalist
1994	David Halberstam	October 1964	Finalist
1994	Randall A. Hendricks	Inside the Strike Zone	Finalist
1994	Daniel Coyle	Hardball: A Season in the Projects	Finalist
1994	Al Stump	Cobb: The Life and Times of the Meanest Man Who Ever Played Baseball	Finalist
1994	Nicholas Dawidoff	The Catcher Was a Spy: The Mysterious Life of Moe Berg	Finalist
1994	Michael Bishop	Brittle Innings	Finalist
1994	James A. Riley	The Biographical Encyclopedia of the Negro Baseball Leagues	Finalist
1994	Geoffrey C. Ward & Ken Burns	Baseball: An Illustrated History	Finalist
1995	Henry W. Thomas	Walter Johnson: Baseball's Big Train	Winner
1995	Dan Gutman	Banana Bats and Dingdong Balls: A Century of Baseball Inventions	Finalist
1995	Pete Williams	Card Sharks: How Upper Deck Turned a Child's Hobby into a High-Stakes, Billion-Dollar Business	Finalist
1995	Jay Rogoff	The Cutoff	Finalist
1995	Greg Rhodes & John Erardi	Crosley Field: An Illustrated History of a Classic Ballpark	Finalist
1995	W.P. Kinsella	The Dixon Cornbelt League and Other Baseball Stories	Finalist
1995	Jack Torry	Endless Summers: The Fall and Rise of the Cleveland Indians	Finalist
1995	David Zang	Fleet Walker's Divided Heart	Finalist
1995	David Falkner	Great Time Coming: The Life of Jackie Robinson	Finalist
1995	Charles Alexander	Rogers Hornsby: A Biography	Finalist
1995	Richard Panek	Waterloo Diamonds: A Midwestern Town and Its Minor League Team	Finalist
1995	Stefan Fatsis	Wild and Outside: How a Renegade Minor League Revived the Spirit of Baseball in America's Heartland	Finalist
1996	Marty Appel	Slide, Kelly, Slide: The Wild Life and Times of Mike "King" Kelly, Baseball's First Superstar	Winner
1996	Dan Shaughnessy	At Fenway: Dispatches from Red Sox Nation	Finalist
1996	Richard Cahan & Mark Jacob	The Game that Was: The George Brace Baseball Photo Collection	Finalist
1996	Rachel Robinson & Lee Daniels	Jackie Robinson: An Intimate Portrait	Finalist
1996	David Cataneo	Tony C.: The Triumph and Tragedy of Tony Conigliaro	Finalist
1996	Mike Shropshire	Seasons in Hell: With Billy Martin, Whitey Herzog and "The Worst Baseball Team in History" ― The 1973–1975 Texas Rangers	Finalist
1996	Mark Winegardner	The Veracruz Blues	Finalist
1996	Peter Golenbock	Wrigleyville: A Magical History Tour of the Chicago Cubs	Finalist
1997	Thomas Dyja	Play for a Kingdom	Winner
1997	Arnold Rampersad	Jackie Robinson: A Biography	Finalist
1997	Alan Klein	Baseball on the Border: A Tale of Two Laredos	Finalist
1997	David Nemec	The Great Encyclopedia of 19th Century Major League Baseball	Finalist
1997	Roger Kahn	Memories of Summer	Finalist
1997	Joseph J. Dittmar	Baseball Records Registry	Finalist
1997	David Pietrusza	Lights On! The Wild Century-Long Saga of Night Baseball	Finalist
1997	Greg Rhodes & John Erardi	Big Red Dynasty: How Bob Howsam & Sparky Anderson Built the Big Red Machine	Finalist
1997	Joseph A. Reaves	Warsaw to Wrigley: A Foreign Correspondent's Tale of Coming Home from Communism to the Cubs	Finalist
1997	Paul Dickson	The Joy of Keeping Score: How Scoring the Game Has Influenced and Enhanced the History of Baseball	Finalist
1998	David Pietrusza	Judge and Jury: The Life and Times of Judge Kenesaw Mountain Landis	Winner
1998	Dave Rosenbaum	If They Don't Win It's a Shame: The Year the Marlins Bought the World Series	Finalist
1998	Frank Dolson	Jim Bunning: Baseball and Beyond	Finalist
1998	Larry Canale	Mickey Mantle: The Yankee Years: The Classic Photography of Ozzie Sweet	Finalist
1998	John Thorn	Treasures of the Baseball Hall of Fame	Finalist
1998	Richard Bak	A Place for Summer: A Narrative History of Tiger Stadium	Finalist
1998	Rodney Torreson	The Ripening of Pinstripes	Finalist
1998	Samuel O. Regalado	Viva Baseball: Latin Major Leaguers and Their Special Hunger	Finalist
1998	William J. Ryczek	When Johnny Came Sliding Home: The Post-Civil War Baseball Boom, 1865-1870	Finalist
1998	Ray Robinson & Christopher Jennison	Yankee Stadium: 75 Years of Drama, Glamor, and Glory	Finalist
1999	Neal Karlen	Slouching Toward Fargo: A Two-Year Saga of Sinners and St. Paul Saints at the Bottom of the Bush Leagues with Bill Murray, Darryl Strawberry, Dakota Sadie, and Me	Winner
1999	Bruce Adelson	Brushing Back Jim Crow: The Integration of Minor-League Baseball in the American South	Finalist
1999	Bryan Di Salvatore	A Clever Base-Ballist: The Life and Times of John Montgomery Ward	Finalist
1999	William Marshall	Baseball's Pivotal Era, 1945-1951	Finalist
1999	Terry Pluto	Our Tribe: A Baseball Memoir	Finalist
1999	Robert Reed	A Six-Gun Salute: An Illustrated History of the Houston Colt .45s	Finalist
1999	Mark Rucker & Peter Bjarkman	Smoke: The Romance and Lore of Cuban Baseball	Finalist
1999	Roberto Gonzalez Echevarria	The Pride of Havana: A History of Cuban Baseball	Finalist
1999	Hobe Hays	Take Two and Hit to Right: Golden Days on the Semi-Pro Diamond	Finalist
1999	Dean Chadwin	Those Damn Yankees: The Secret Life of America's Greatest Franchise	Finalist
1999	Burt Solomon	Where They Ain't: The Fabled Life and Untimely Death of the Original Baltimore Orioles, the Team That Gave Birth to Modern Baseball	Finalist

=== 2000s ===
Year	Author(s)	Book	Result
2000	Reed Browning	Cy Young: A Baseball Life	Winner
2000	David McGimpsey	Imagining Baseball: America's Pastime and Popular Culture	Finalist
2000	Roger Kahn	The Head Game: Baseball Seen from the Pitcher's Mound	Finalist
2000	Darryl Brock	Havana Heat	Finalist
2000	Richard Ben Cramer	Joe DiMaggio: The Hero's Life	Finalist
2000	Milton H. Jamail	Full Count: Inside Cuban Baseball	Finalist
2000	Jim Kaplan	Lefty Grove: American Original	Finalist
2000	Jeff Hutton	Perfect Silence	Finalist
2000	Glenn Stout & Richard A. Johnson	Red Sox Century: One Hundred Years of Red Sox Baseball	Finalist
2000	Tim Peeler	Touching All the Bases: Poems from Baseball	Finalist
2001	Tom Stanton	The Final Season: Fathers, Sons, and One Last Season in a Classic American Ballpark	Winner
2001	Jerry Kelly	Bushville: Life and Time in Amateur Baseball	Finalist
2001	Steve Fainaru & Ray Sanchez	The Duke of Havana: Baseball, Cuba, and the Search for the American Dream	Finalist
2001	James P. Quigel Jr. & Louis E. Hunsinger Jr.	Gateway to the Majors: Williamsport and Minor League Baseball	Finalist
2001	Martin Donell Kohout	Hal Chase: The Defiant Life and Turbulent Times of Baseball's Biggest Crook	Finalist
2001	Pat Williams	Marketing Your Dreams: Business and Life Lessons from Bill Veeck	Finalist
2001	James N. Giglio	Musial: From Stash to Stan the Man	Finalist
2001	Marty Appel	Now Pitching for the Yankees: Spinning the News for Mickey, Billy, and George	Finalist
2001	Jim Morris & Joel Engel	The Oldest Rookie: Big League Dreams from a Small-town Guy	Finalist
2001	Greg Rhodes & John Snyder	Redleg Journal: Year by Year and Day by Day with the Cincinnati Reds Since 1866	Finalist
2002	Howard Bryant	Shut Out: A Story of Race and Baseball in Boston	Winner
2002	Jane Leavy	Sandy Koufax: A Lefty's Legacy	Finalist
2002	Tony Castro	Mickey Mantle: America's Prodigal Son	Finalist
2002	Charles Alexander	Breaking the Slump: Baseball in the Depression Era	Finalist
2002	Larry Lester	Black Baseball's National Showcase: The East-West All-Star Game, 1933-1953	Finalist
2002	Glenn Stout & Richard A. Johnson	Yankees Century: 100 Years of New York Yankees Baseball	Finalist
2002	John Theodore	Baseball's Natural: The Story of Eddie Waitkus	Finalist
2002	David L. Fleitz	Louis Sockalexis: The First Cleveland Indian	Finalist
2002	Steven Travers	Barry Bonds: Baseball's Superman	Finalist
2002	Richard J. Tofel	A Legend in the Making: The New York Yankees in 1939	Finalist
2003	Michael Lewis	Moneyball: The Art of Winning an Unfair Game	Winner
2003	Brad Snyder	Beyond the Shadow of the Senators: The Untold Story of the Homestead Grays and the Integration of Baseball	Finalist
2003	Jim Bouton	Foul Ball: My Life and Hard Times Trying to Save an Old Ballpark	Finalist
2003	Noah Liberman	Glove Affairs: The Romance, History, and Tradition of the Baseball Glove	Finalist
2003	Elizabeth V. Warren	The Perfect Game: American Looks at Baseball	Finalist
2003	Paul O'Neill & Burton Rocks	Me and My Dad: A Baseball Memoir	Finalist
2003	Tom Stanton	The Road to Cooperstown: A Father, Two Sons, and the Journey of a Lifetime	Finalist
2003	Henry D. Fetter	Taking on the Yankees: Winning and Losing in the Business of Baseball, 1903-2003	Finalist
2003	David Halberstam	The Teammates: A Portrait of a Friendship	Finalist
2003	James E. Elfers	The Tour to End All Tours: The Story of Major League Baseball's 1913-1914 World Tour	Finalist
2004	Leigh Montville	Ted Williams: The Biography of an American Hero	Winner
2004	W.C. Madden & Patrick J. Stewart	The College World Series: A Baseball History 1947-2003	Finalist
2004	Bob Bailey	History of the Junior World Series	Finalist
2004	Jeff Pearlman	The Bad Guys Won! A Season of Brawling, Boozing, Bimbo Chasing, and Championship Baseball with Straw, Doc, Mookie, Nails, the Kid, and the Rest of the 1986 Mets, the Rowdiest Team Ever to Put on a New York Uniform – and Maybe the Best	Finalist
2004	Greg Hoard	Joe: Rounding Third & Heading for Home	Finalist
2004	Buster Olney	The Last Night of the Yankee Dynasty: The Game, the Team, and the Cost of Greatness	Finalist
2004	Jim Collins	The Last Best League: One Summer, One Season, One Dream	Finalist
2004	Neil Lanctot	Negro League Baseball: The Rise and Ruin of a Black Institution	Finalist
2004	Alan Schwarz	The Numbers Game: Baseball's Lifelong Fascination with Statistics	Finalist
2004	Michael Sokolove	The Ticket Out: Darryl Strawberry and the Boys of Crenshaw	Finalist
2005	Jonathan Eig	Luckiest Man: The Life and Death of Lou Gehrig	Winner
2005	Ozzie Sweet & Larry Canale	The Boys of Spring: Timeless Portraits from the Grapefruit League, 1947-2005	Finalist
2005	Peter C. Bjarkman	Diamonds Around the Globe: The Encyclopedia of International Baseball	Finalist
2005	Howard Bryant	Juicing the Game: Drugs, Power, and the Fight for the Soul of Major League Baseball	Finalist
2005	Tony Massarotti & John Harper	A Tale of Two Cities: The 2004 Yankees-Red Sox Rivalry and the War for the Pennant	Finalist
2005	Buzz Bissinger	3 Nights in August: Strategy, Heartbreak, and Joy Inside the Mind of a Manager	Finalist
2005	David Block & Tim Wiles	Baseball Before We Knew It: A Search For the Roots of The Game	Finalist
2005	Willam Price Fox	Satchel Paige's America	Finalist
2005	Bill Simmons	Now I Can Die in Peace: How ESPN's Sports Guy Found Salvation, with a Little Help From Nomar, Pedro, Shawshank, and the 2004 Red Sox	Finalist
2005	Stephen Wong	Smithsonian Baseball: Inside the World's Finest Private Collections	Finalist
2006	Peter Morris	A Game of Inches: The Game on the Field and the Game Behind the Scenes	Winner
2006	Leigh Montville	The Big Bam: The Life and Times of Babe Ruth	Finalist
2006	David Levinthal	Baseball	Finalist
2006	Joshua Prager	The Echoing Green: The Untold Story of Bobby Thomson, Ralph Branca and the Shot Heard Round the World	Finalist
2006	David Maraniss	Clemente: The Passion and Grace of Baseball's Last Hero	Finalist
2006	Mark Lamster	Spalding's World Tour: The Epic Adventure that Took Baseball Around the Globe	Finalist
2006	Brad Snyder	A Well-Paid Slave: Curt Flood's Fight for Free Agency in Professional Sports	Finalist
2006	John Gall & Gary Engel	Sayonara Home Run: The Art of the Japanese Baseball Card	Finalist
2006	William C. Kashatus	Money Pitcher: Chief Bender and the Tragedy of Indian Assimilation	Finalist
2006	Sam Walker	Fantasyland: A Season on Baseball's Lunatic Fringe	Finalist
2007	Joe Posnanski	The Soul of Baseball: A Road Trip Through Buck O'Neil's America	Winner
2007	Jim Reisler	The Best Game Ever: Pirates vs. Yankees: October 13, 1960	Finalist
2007	Lee Lowenfish	Branch Rickey: Baseball's Ferocious Gentleman	Finalist
2007	Norman L. Macht	Connie Mack and the Early Years of Baseball	Finalist
2007	Peter Morris	Level Playing Fields: How the Groundskeeping Murphy Brothers Shaped Baseball	Finalist
2007	Cait Murphy	Crazy '08: How a Cast of Cranks, Rogues, Boneheads, and Magnates Created the Greatest Year in Baseball History	Finalist
2007	Jonathan Eig	Opening Day: The Story of Jackie Robinson's First Season	Finalist
2007	Dennis D'Agostino & Bonnie Crosby	Through a Blue Lens: The Brooklyn Dodgers Photographs of Barney Stein, 1937-1957	Finalist
2007	Dan Shaughnessy	Senior Year: A Father, A Son and High School Baseball	Finalist
2007	Tom Stanton	Ty and The Babe: Baseball's Fiercest Rivals: A Surprising Friendship and the 1941 Has-Beens Golf Championship	Finalist
2008	Kadir Nelson	We are the Ship: The Story of Negro League Baseball	Winner
2008	John Feinstein	Living on the Black: Two Pitchers, Two Teams, One Season to Remember	Finalist
2008	Bill Nowlin	Red Sox Threads: Odds and Ends from Red Sox History	Finalist
2008	John Rosengren	Hammerin' Hank, George Almighty, and the Say Hey Kid: The Year that Changed Baseball Forever	Finalist
2008	Daniel K. Levitt	Ed Barrow: The Bulldog Who Built the Yankees' First Dynasty	Finalist
2008	William C. Kashatus	Almost a Dynasty: The Rise & Fall of the 1980 Phillies	Finalist
2008	Andy Strasberg, Bob Thompson & Tim Wiles	Baseball's Greatest Hit: The Story of "Take Me Out to the Ballgame"	Finalist
2008	John Hanley & Chris De Luca	Classic Cubs: A Tribute to the Men and Magic of Wrigley Field	Finalist
2008	None	Ballet in the Dirt: The Golden Age of Neil Leifer	Finalist
2009	Larry Tye	Satchel: The Life and Times of an American Legend	Winner
2009	Warren Corbett	The Wizard of Waxahachie: Paul Richards and the End of Baseball as We Knew It	Finalist
2009	Joe Torre & Tom Verducci	The Yankee Years	Finalist
2009	Mark Frost	Game Six: Cincinnati, Boston, and the 1975 World Series: The Triumph of America's Pastime	Finalist
2009	Matt McCarthy	Odd Man Out: A Year on the Mound with a Minor League Misfit	Finalist
2009	Michael D'Antonio	Forever Blue: The True Story of Walter O'Malley, Baseball's Most Controversial Owner, and the Dodgers of Brooklyn and Los Angeles	Finalist
2009	Mike Vaccaro	The First Fall Classic: The Red Sox, the Giants and the Cast of Players, Pugs and Politicos Who Re-Invented the World Series in 1912	Finalist
2009	Brett Friedlander & R. W. Reising	Chasing Moonlight: The True Story of Field of Dream's Doc Graham	Finalist
2009	Peter Morris	Catcher: How the Man Behind the Plate Became an American Folk Hero	Finalist
2009	Bruce Weber	As They See 'Em: A Fan's Travels Through the Land of Umpires	Finalist

=== 2010s ===
Year	Author(s)	Book	Result
2010	Howard Bryant	The Last Hero: A Life of Henry Aaron	Winner
2010	Jane Leavy	The Last Boy: Mickey Mantle and the End of America's Childhood	Finalist
2010	James Forr & David Proctor	Pie Traynor: A Baseball Biography	Finalist
2010	Edward Achorn	59 in '84: Old Hoss Radbourn, Barehanded Baseball and the Greatest Season a Pitcher Ever Had	Finalist
2010	James S. Hirsch	Willie Mays: The Life, The Legend	Finalist
2010	Robert Elias	The Empire Strikes Out: How Baseball Sold U.S. Foreign Policy and Promoted the American Way Abroad	Finalist
2010	Josh Wilker	Cardboard Gods: An All-American Tale Told through Baseball Cards	Finalist
2010	Steve Berg	Target Field: The New Home of the Minnesota Twins	Finalist
2010	Dick Perez	The Immortals: An Art Collection of Baseball's Best	Finalist
2010	D.J. Stout	The Amazing Tale of Mr. Herbert and His Fabulous Alpine Cowboys Baseball Club: An Illustrated History of the Best Little Semipro Baseball Team in Texas	Finalist
2011	Kostya Kennedy	56: Joe DiMaggio and the Last Magic Number in Sports	Winner
2011	Dennis Snelling	The Greatest Minor League: A History of the Pacific Coast League, 1903-1957	Finalist
2011	John Thorn	Baseball in the Garden of Eden: The Secret History of the Early Game	Finalist
2011	Chad Harbach	The Art of Fielding	Finalist
2011	Dan Barry	Bottom of the 33rd: Hope, Redemption, and Baseball's Longest Game	Finalist
2011	Wilfred Santiago	21: The Story of Roberto Clemente	Finalist
2011	Neil Lanctot	Campy: The Two Lives of Roy Campanella	Finalist
2011	Neal & Constance McCabe	The Big Show: Charles M. Conlon's Golden Age Baseball Photographs	Finalist
2011	Thomas Aiello	The Kings of Casino Park: Black Baseball in the Lost Season of 1932	Finalist
2011	Glenn Stout	Fenway 1912: The Birth of a Ballpark, a Championship Season, and Fenway's Remarkable First Year	Finalist
2012	Paul Dickson	Bill Veeck: Baseball's Greatest Maverick	Winner
2012	Norman L. Macht	Connie Mack: The Turbulent and Triumphant Years, 1915-1931	Finalist
2012	Robert K. Fitts	Banzai Babe Ruth: Baseball, Espionage, and Assassination during the 1934 Tour of Japan	Finalist
2012	Harvey Araton	Driving Mr. Yogi: Yogi Berra, Ron Guidry, and Baseball's Greatest Gift	Finalist
2012	Tom Clavin & Danny Peary	Gil Hodges: The Brooklyn Bums, The Miracle Mets, and the Extraordinary Life of a Baseball Legend	Finalist
2012	Andy Jurinko & Christopher Jennison	Golden Boys: Baseball Portraits, 1946-1960	Finalist
2012	Rob Miech	The Last Natural: Bryce Harper's Big Gamble in Sin City and the Greatest Amateur Season Ever	Finalist
2012	Marty Appel	Pinstripe Empire: The New York Yankees from Before the Babe to After the Boss	Finalist
2012	Joseph M. Schuster	The Might Have Been: A Novel	Finalist
2012	Gregory Jordan	Willie Mays Aikens: Safe at Home	Finalist
2013	Herschel Cobb	Heart of a Tiger: Growing Up with My Grandfather, Ty Cobb	Winner
2013	Tom Dunkel	Color Blind: The Forgotten Team that Broke Baseball's Color Line	Finalist
2013	Allen Barra	Mickey and Willie: Mantle and Mays, the Parallel Lives of Baseball's Golden Age	Finalist
2013	Michael Joyce	Going the Distance	Finalist
2013	Lucas Mann	Class A: Baseball in the Middle of Everywhere	Finalist
2013	Roberts Ehrgott	Mr. Wrigley's Ball Club: Chicago and the Cubs during the Jazz Age	Finalist
2013	Valerie Sayers	The Powers	Finalist
2013	Mike Lackey	Spitballing: The Baseball Days of Long Bob Ewing	Finalist
2013	Edward Achorn	The Summer of Beer and Whiskey: How Brewers, Barkeeps, Rowdies, Immigrants, and a Wild Pennant Fight Made Baseball America's Game	Finalist
2013	Robert Weintraub	The Victory Season: The End of World War II and the Birth of Baseball's Golden Age	Finalist
2014	Kostya Kennedy	Pete Rose: An American Dilemma	Winner
2014	William C. Kashatus	Jackie and Campy: The Untold Story of Their Rocky Relationship and the Breaking of Baseball's Color Line	Finalist
2014	John Rosengren	The Fight of Their Lives: How Juan Marichal and John Roseboro Turned Baseball's Ugliest Brawl into a Story of Forgiveness and Redemption	Finalist
2014	Doug Wilson	Brooks: The Biography of Brooks Robinson	Finalist
2014	Rick Huhn	The Chalmers Race: Ty Cobb, Napoleon Lajoie, and the Controversial 1910 Batting Title that Became a National Obsession	Finalist
2014	Dennis Snelling	Johnny Evers: A Baseball Biography	Finalist
2014	Andy McCue	Mover and Shaker: Walter O'Malley, the Dodgers, and Baseball's Westward Expansion	Finalist
2014	Roger Kahn	Rickey & Robinson: The True, Untold Story of the Integration of Baseball	Finalist
2014	Rob Goldman	Nolan Ryan: The Making of a Pitcher	Finalist
2014	Scott Simkus	Outsider Baseball: The Weird World of Hardball on the Fringe, 1876-1950	Finalist
2014	Bill Madden	1954: The Year Willie Mays and the First Generation of Black Superstars Changed Major League Baseball Forever	Finalist
2014	George Will	A Nice Little Place of the North Side: Wrigley Field at One Hundred	Finalist
2015	Charles Leerhsen	Ty Cobb: A Terrible Beauty	Winner
2015	Charles Fountain	The Betrayal: The 1919 World Series and the Birth of Modern Baseball	Finalist
2015	Travis Sawchik	Big Data Baseball: Math, Miracles, and the End of a 20-Year Losing Streak	Finalist
2015	Steve Steinberg & Lyle Spatz	The Colonel and Hug: The Partnership that Transformed the New York Yankees	Finalist
2015	Bill Pennington	Billy Martin: Baseball's Flawed Genius	Finalist
2015	Philip Beard	Swing	Finalist
2015	John Klima	The Game Must Go On: Hank Greenberg, Pete Gray, and the Great Days of Baseball on the Home Front, 1941-1945	Finalist
2015	Gary Cieradkowski	The League of Outsider Baseball: An Illustrated History of Baseball's Forgotten Heroes	Finalist
2015	Jeff Katz	Split Season, 1981: Fernandomania, the Bronx Zoo, and the Strike that Saved Baseball	Finalist
2015	Jon Pessah	The Game: Inside the Secret World of Major League Baseball's Power Brokers	Finalist
2016	Michael Leahy	The Last Innocents: The Collision of the Turbulent Sixties and the Los Angeles Dodgers	Winner
2016	Jeff Passan	The Arm: Inside the Billion-Dollar Mystery of the Most Valuable Commodity in Sports	Finalist
2016	Tim Peeler	Wild in the Strike Zone: Baseball Poems	Finalist
2016	David Duchovny	Bucky F*cking Dent	Finalist
2016	Ben Lindbergh & Sam Miller	The Only Rule Is It Has to Work: Our Wild Experiment Building a New Kind of Baseball Team	Finalist
2016	Stephen Wong & Dave Grob	Game Worn: Baseball Treasures from the Game's Greatest Heroes and Moments	Finalist
2016	Glenn Stout	The Selling of the Babe: The Deal that Changed Baseball and Created a Legend	Finalist
2016	Tom Stanton	Terror in the City of Champions: Murder, Baseball, and the Secret Society that Shocked Depression-Era Detroit	Finalist
2016	Michael Tackett	The Baseball Whisperer: A Small-Town Coach Who Shaped Big League Dreams	Finalist
2016	George J. Gmelch	Playing with Tigers: A Minor League Chronicle of the Sixties	Finalist
2017	Marty Appel	Casey Stengel: Baseball's Greatest Character	Winner
2017	Sridhar Pappu	The Year of the Pitcher: Bob Gibson, Denny McLain, and the End of Baseball’s Golden Age	Finalist
2017	John Eisenberg	The Streak: Lou Gehrig, Cal Ripken Jr., and Baseball’s Most Historic Record	Finalist
2017	Dennis Evanosky & Eric J. Kos	Lost Ballparks	Finalist
2017	Paul Dickson	Leo Durocher: Baseball’s Prodigal Son	Finalist
2017	Dennis Snelling	Lefty O’Doul: Baseball’s Forgotten Ambassador	Finalist
2017	Jason Turbow	Dynastic, Bombastic, Fantastic: Reggie, Rollie, Catfish, and Charlie Finley’s Swinging A’s	Finalist
2017	Richard Sandomir	The Pride of the Yankees: Lou Gehrig, Gary Cooper, and the Making of a Classic	Finalist
2017	Kevin Cook	Electric October: Seven World Series Games, Six Lives, Five Minutes of Fame that Lasted Forever	Finalist
2017	Keith Law	Smart Baseball: The Story behind the Old Stats that Are Ruining the Game, the New Ones that are Running It, and the Right Way to Think about Baseball	Finalist
2018	Rob Neyer	Power Ball: Anatomy of a Modern Baseball Game	Winner
2018	Jane Leavy	The Big Fella: Babe Ruth and the World He Created	Finalist
2018	Tony Castro	Gehrig & the Babe: The Friendship and the Feud	Finalist
2018	Bill Gruber	Baseball in a Grain of Sand: Seeing the Game through a Small Town Team	Finalist
2018	Tom Friend	The Chicken Runs at Midnight: A Daughter's Message from Heaven that Changed a Father's Heart and Won a World Series	Finalist
2018	Anne R. Keene	The Cloudbuster Nine: The Untold Story of Ted Williams and the Baseball Team that Helped Win World War II	Finalist
2018	Peter Devereaux	Game Faces: Early Baseball Cards from the Library of Congress	Finalist
2018	Mark Di Ionno	Gods of Wood and Stone	Finalist
2018	Todd Radom	Winning Ugly: A Visual History of the Most Bizarre Baseball Uniforms Ever Worn	Finalist
2018	Bill Nowlin	Tom Yawkey: Patriarch of the Boston Red Sox	Finalist
2018	John Erardi	Tony Perez: From Cuba to Cooperstown	Finalist
2018	Randy Roberts & Johnny Smith	A Season in the Sun: The Rise of Mickey Mantle	Finalist
2019	Jeremy Beer	Oscar Charleston: The Life and Legend of Baseball's Greatest Forgotten Player	Winner
2019	Paul Goldberger	Ballpark: Baseball in the American City	Finalist
2019	Tyler Kepner	K: A History of Baseball in Ten Pitches	Finalist
2019	Bill Pennington	Chumps to Champs: How the Worst Teams in Yankees History Led to the 90’s Dynasty	Finalist
2019	Greg Rhodes, John Erardi, & Greg Gajus	Baseball Revolutionaries: How the 1869 Cincinnati Red Stockings Rocked the Country and Made Baseball Famous	Finalist
2019	Alex Speier	Homegrown: How the Red Sox Built a Champion from the Ground Up	Finalist
2019	Bob Klapisch & Paul Solotaroff	Inside the Empire: the True Power behind the New York Yankees	Finalist
2019	Don Zminda	The Legendary Harry Caray: Baseball's Greatest Salesman	Finalist
2019	Ron Rapoport	Let’s Play Two: The Legend of Mr. Cub, The Life of Ernie Banks	Finalist
2019	Ben Lindbergh & Travis Sawchik	The MVP Machine: How Baseball’s New Nonconformists Are Using Data to Build Better Players	Finalist
2019	Christopher J. Phillips	Scouting and Scoring: How We Know What We Know about Baseball	Finalist
2019	Jason Turbow	They Bled Blue: Fernandomania, Strike-Season Mayhem, and the Weirdest Championship Baseball Had Ever Seen	Finalist

=== 2020s ===
Year	Author(s)	Book	Result
2020	Thomas W. Gilbert	How Baseball Happened: Outrageous Lies Exposed! The True Story Revealed	Winner
2020	Mitchell Nathanson	Bouton: The Life of a Baseball Original	Finalist
2020	Dale Tafoya	Billy Ball: Billy Martin and the Resurrection of the Oakland A's	Finalist
2020	Emily Nemens	The Cactus League	Finalist
2020	Bill Dembski, Alex Thomas, & Brian Vikander	Dalko: The Untold Story of Baseball's Fastest Pitcher	Finalist
2020	Robert K. Fitts	Issei Baseball: The Story of the First Japanese American Ballplayers	Finalist
2020	Howard Burman	Mutt's Dream: Making the Mick	Finalist
2020	Bill Madden	Tom Seaver: A Terrific Life	Finalist
2020	Jared Diamond	Swing Kings: The Inside Story of Baseball's Home Run Revolution	Finalist
2020	Brad Balukjian	The Wax Pack: On the Open Road in Search of Baseball's Afterlife	Finalist
2020	Ethan D. Bryan	A Year of Playing Catch: What a Simple Daily Experiment Taught Me about Life	Finalist
2021	Joe Posnanski	The Baseball 100	Winner
2021	Dan Taylor	Lights, Camera, Fastball: How the Hollywood Stars Changed Baseball	Finalist
2021	Andy Martino	Cheated: The Inside Story of the Astros Scandal and a Colorful History of Sign Stealing	Finalist
2021	Dave Parker & Dave Jordan	Cobra: A Life of Baseball and Brotherhood	Finalist
2021	Bryan Hoch	The Bronx Zoom: Inside the New York Yankees’ Most Bizarre Season	Finalist
2021	Tim Wendel	Escape from Castro’s Cuba	Finalist
2021	Steven Treder	Forty Years a Giant: The Life of Horace Stoneham	Finalist
2021	Lonnie Wheeler	The Bona Fide Legend of Cool Papa Bell: Speed, Grace, and the Negro Leagues	Finalist
2021	Luke Epplin	Our Team: The Epic Story of Four Men and the World Series that Changed Baseball	Finalist
2022	Kostya Kennedy	True: The Four Seasons of Jackie Robinson	Winner
2022	Judith R. Hiltner & James R. Walker	Red Barber: The Life and Legacy of a Broadcasting Legend	Finalist
2022	Howard Bryant	Rickey: The Life and Legend of an American Original	Finalist
2022	Tyler Kepner	The Grandest Stage: A History of the World Series	Finalist
2022	Ron Shelton	The Church of Baseball: The Making of Bull Durham: Home Runs, Bad Calls, Crazy Fights, Big Swings, and a Hit	Finalist
2022	Paul Aron	The Lineup: Ten Books that Changed Baseball	Finalist
2022	Dan Good	Playing Through the Pain: Ken Caminiti and the Steroids Confession That Changed Baseball Forever	Finalist
2022	Joe Maddon & Tom Verducci	The Book of Joe: Trying Not to Suck at Baseball and Life	Finalist
2022	Jason Cannon	Charlie Murphy: The Iconoclastic Showman Behind the Chicago Cubs	Finalist
2022	Bob Ryan & Bill Chuck	In Scoring Position: 40 Years of a Baseball Love Affair	Finalist
2023	Joe Posnanski	Why We Love Baseball: A History in 50 Moments	Winner
2023	Jesse Cole	Banana Ball: The Unbelievably True Story of the Savannah Bananas	Finalist
2023	Jim Chapman	Baseball Photography of the Deadball Era: Rediscovering the Early Lensmen and Their Indelible Images that Brought the Game from the Field to the Fans	Finalist
2023	Steven P. Gietschier	Baseball: The Turbulent Midcentury Years	Finalist
2023	Erik Sherman	Daybreak at Chavez Ravine: Fernandomania and the Remaking of the Los Angeles Dodgers	Finalist
2023	Mark Stevens	The Fireballer: A Novel	Finalist
2023	Jeffrey Loria	From the Front Row: Reflections of a Major League Baseball Owner and Modern Art Dealer	Finalist
2023	Russell A. Carleton	The New Ballgame: The Not-So-Hidden Forces Shaping Modern Baseball	Finalist
2023	David Vaught	Spitter: Baseball’s Notorious Gaylord Perry	Finalist
2023	Ryan McGee	Welcome to the Circus of Baseball: A Story of the Perfect Summer, at the Perfect Ballpark, at the Perfect Time	Finalist
2023	Adam Lazarus	The Wingmen: The Unlikely, Unusual, and Unbreakable Friendship between John Glenn and Ted Williams	Finalist
2024	Kevin Baker	The New York Game: Baseball and the Rise of a New City	Winner
2024	Aaron Fischman	A Baseball Gaijin: Chasing a Dream to Japan and Back	Finalist
2024	Noah Gittell	Baseball: The Movie	Finalist
2024	Keith O'Brien	Charlie Hustle: the Rise and Fall of Pete Rose, and the Last Glory Days of Baseball	Finalist
2024	Erik Sherman	Dewey: Behind the Gold Glove by Dwight Evans	Finalist
2024	Andy McCullough	The Last of His Kind: Clayton Kershaw & the Burden of Greatness	Finalist
2024	Steve Steinberg & Lyle Spatz	Mike Donlin: A Rough and Rowdy Life from New York Baseball Idol to Stage and Screen	Finalist
2024	Tim Newby	The Original Louisville Slugger: The Life and Times of Forgotten Baseball Legend Pete Browning	Finalist
2024	Morris Hoffman	Pinch Hitting	Finalist
2024	Eric Vickrey	Season of Shattered Dreams: Postwar Baseball, The Spokane Indians, and a Tragic Bus Crash that Changed Everything	Finalist
2025	John W. Miller	The Last Manager: How Earl Weaver Tricked, Tormented, and Reinvented Baseball	Winner
2025	Henry Schipper	The Ball Dreams of the Sky	Finalist
2025	Jim Leeke	Big Loosh: The Unruly Life of Umpire Ron Luciano	Finalist
2025	Simon Pole	The Black Bat: A Supernatural Baseball Epic	Finalist
2025	Martin H. Bush	Deadbeats, Dead Balls, and the 1914 Boston Braves	Finalist
2025	Will Bardenwerper	Homestand: Small Town Baseball and the Fight for the Soul of America	Finalist
2025	Jane Leavy	Make Me Commissioner: I Know What's Wrong with Baseball and How to Fix It	Finalist
2025	Phil Rosenzweig	One Splendid Season: Baseball and America in 1912	Finalist
2025	Gerald Early	Play Harder: The Triumph of Black Baseball in America	Finalist
2025	Andy Strasberg	Strasberg's Base Ball Klediment Tales	Finalist

== See also ==
- Seymour Medal (SABR)
- List of literary awards
- List of sports journalism awards
