= Herman Franks =

American baseball player and coach (1914–2009)

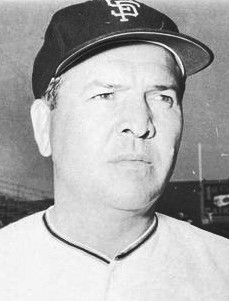
- Catcher / Manager
- Born: January 4, 1914; Price, Utah, U.S.
- Died: March 30, 2009 (aged 95); Salt Lake City, Utah, U.S.
- Batted: Left Threw: Right

MLB debut
- April 27, 1939, for the St. Louis Cardinals

Last MLB appearance
- August 28, 1949, for the New York Giants

MLB statistics
- Batting average: .199
- Home runs: 3
- Runs batted in: 43
- Managerial record: 605–521
- Winning %: .537
- Stats at Baseball Reference

Teams
- As player: St. Louis Cardinals (1939); Brooklyn Dodgers (1940–1941); Philadelphia Athletics (1947–1948); New York Giants (1949); As manager: San Francisco Giants (1965–1968); Chicago Cubs (1977–1979); As coach: New York Giants (1949–1955); San Francisco Giants (1958; 1964); Chicago Cubs (1970)

Career highlights and awards
- World Series champion (1954)

Herman Louis Franks (January 4, 1914 – March 30, 2009) was an American catcher, coach, manager, general manager and scout in Major League Baseball. He was born in Price, Utah, to Italian-American immigrant parents and attended the University of Utah.

== Playing career ==
A left-handed hitter who threw right-handed, Franks was listed at 5 feet 10 inches (1.78 m) tall and 187 pounds (85 kg). He broke into professional baseball with the Hollywood Stars of the Pacific Coast League in 1932. Three years later, he was acquired by the St. Louis Cardinals and joined their vast farm system.

He made the Cardinals for just 17 games and 17 at-bats in 1939, before being drafted by the Brooklyn Dodgers, where he served as a second-string catcher in 1940–41 and began his long association with Leo Durocher, then Brooklyn's manager. As a Dodger, Franks caught Tex Carleton's no-hitter on April 30, 1940.

Franks missed 3 1/2 seasons during World War II, when he served in the United States Navy in the Pacific Theater of Operations and attained the rank of lieutenant (junior grade). He resumed his playing career in 1946 with the Triple-A Montreal Royals, then became the playing manager of the Dodgers' St. Paul Saints affiliate in the Triple-A American Association in 1947. In August of that season, however, he resigned his post to return to the Major Leagues as a backup catcher with the Philadelphia Athletics, where he appeared in 48 games in 1947–48 and batted .221.

== Coaching career ==
In 1949, Franks received his first coaching assignment, as an aide to Durocher with the New York Giants, and was activated for one final MLB game on August 28, 1949—going 2-for-3 against the Cincinnati Reds in a 4–2 New York triumph.

As a coach with the Giants from 1949 to 1955, he was a member of two National League championship clubs (1951, 1954) and was the third-base coach of the World Series (1954) title team. However, he performed multiple tasks for Durocher during those seven seasons. According to author Joshua Prager in his 2006 book The Echoing Green, Franks played a critical role in the Giants' Bobby Thomson's famous pennant-winning home run in the 1951 NL tiebreaker playoffs—Baseball's Shot Heard Round The World. According to Prager, Franks was stationed in the Giants' center-field clubhouse at the Polo Grounds, their home field, stealing the opposing catcher's signs through a telescope and relaying them through second-string catcher Sal Yvars (positioned in the bullpen) to the Giants' coaches and hitters. When asked where he was when Thomson hit his home run, Franks said, in 1996, that he was "doing something for Durocher" at the time.

Whatever his role may have been on that day, Franks was known as a devotee of Durocher-style, win-at-any-cost baseball, including intimidation through flying spikes and brushback pitching. Dodger outfielder Carl Furillo told author Roger Kahn that Franks was known to poke his head into the Brooklyn clubhouse before games, to taunt Furillo that Giant pitchers were planning to throw at his head in the upcoming contest. Furillo, whose hatred for Durocher was so intense that he would engage Durocher in a fistfight in a Giant dugout filled with enemy players, said of the Giants, in Peter Golenbock's book Bums: An Oral History of the Brooklyn Dodgers, "They were dirty ballplayers ... They all wanted to be like Durocher, to copy Durocher. That Herman Franks, he was another one."

== Managing career ==
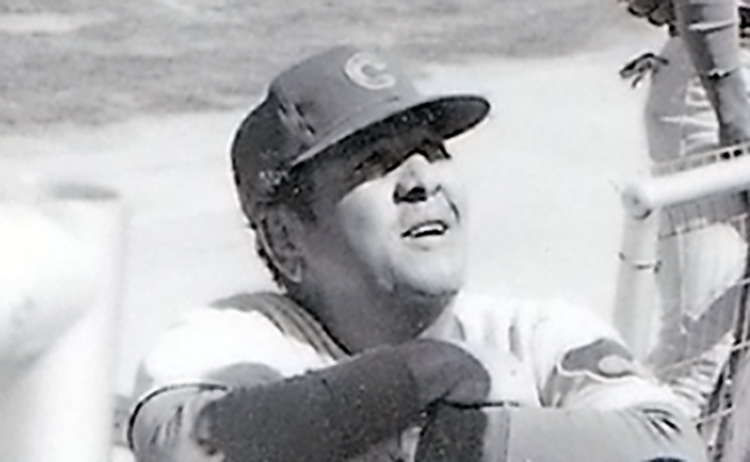
Herman Franks, Cubs manager, 1977

Durocher quit the Giants after the 1955 season, and the team relocated to San Francisco after 1957. From 1956 to 1964, Franks was briefly a Giants' scout, then the general manager of the PCL Salt Lake City Bees. He also spent two additional one-year terms (in 1958 and 1964) as a San Francisco Giants coach before succeeding Alvin Dark as the club's manager a half‐hour after the conclusion of the 1964 season on October 4.

Even though the team featured future Hall of Famers Willie Mays, Orlando Cepeda, Willie McCovey, Juan Marichal and Gaylord Perry, Franks's four seasons (1965–68) managing the Giants each produced frustrating second-place finishes in the National League. The club lost close pennant races to the Los Angeles Dodgers by two games in 1965 and 1 1/2 games in 1966. It finished farther behind the Cardinals the next two years, 10 1/2 lengths out in 1967 and nine back in 1968. After he stepped down as skipper following the conclusion of the 1968 season, he was quoted as saying, "Is finishing second so evil?" He was replaced by Clyde King.

A highly successful businessman off the field, Franks spent the next eight years out of the Major League spotlight, apart from a partial season (August and September 1970) as a pitching coach under Durocher with the Chicago Cubs. Franks returned to the major leagues as newly appointed Cubs general manager Bob Kennedy's first and only choice to replace Jim Marshall as manager on November 24, 1976. In 1977, he led the Cubs back to the .500 level, but the team lost ground in 1978 and was just one game above the break-even mark in September 1979 when Franks resigned (issuing a number of complaints about certain players). He succeeded Kennedy as the Cubs' interim general manager on May 22, 1981. However, most of his tenure was taken up by the 1981 players' strike. He was replaced by Dallas Green just under five months later on October 15 as part of the franchise ownership transition from William Wrigley III to Tribune Company.

Although Franks compiled a poor record as a player (a batting average of .199 with three home runs and 43 RBI in 188 games over parts of six seasons), he notched a winning record as a manager: 605–521, .537.

== Bibliography ==
- Baseball-library.com
- Official Baseball Register (1968 edition). St. Louis: The Sporting News.
- Golenbock, Peter. Bums: An Oral History of the Brooklyn Dodgers. New York: G. P. Putnam's Sons, 1984.

Preceded by Bob Kennedy	Chicago Cubs general manager 1981	Succeeded by Dallas Green
