= Bums: An Oral History of the Brooklyn Dodgers =

1984 book by Peter Golenbock

- Author: Peter Golenbock
- Language: English
- Subject: The Brooklyn Dodgers
- Genre: Non-fiction
- Publisher: G. P. Putnam's Sons
- Publication date: 1984
- Publication place: United States
- Awards: Casey Award (1985)
- ISBN: 978-0399128462

Bums: An Oral History of the Brooklyn Dodgers is a non-fiction baseball book by Peter Golenbock. It was published in 1984 and won the Casey Award for the best baseball book of the year.

== Contents ==
The book is an oral history telling of the Brooklyn Dodgers ballclub. While it covers the Dodgers' entire history in the borough, Golenbock focuses in particular on team's best years, from 1941 until their move to Los Angeles after 1957. He compiled the retellings and recollections of former players, club employees, and diehard Brooklyn Dodger fans.

The book won the Casey Award in 1985 as the best baseball book of the year.

== People interviewed for the book ==
=== Former Dodgers ===
- Cal Abrams
- Sandy Amoros
- Jack Banta
- Rex Barney
- Bobby Bragan
- Ralph Branca
- Roy Campanella
- Carl Erskine
- Herman Franks
- Carl Furillo
- Al Gionfriddo
- Billy Herman
- Kirby Higbe
- Spider Jorgensen
- Clyde King
- Clem Labine
- Cookie Lavagetto
- Sal Maglie
- Dale Mitchell
- Russ Meyer
- Don Newcombe
- Johnny Podres
- Pee Wee Reese
- Pete Reiser
- Ed Roebuck
- Howie Schultz
- Duke Snider
- Karl Spooner

=== Others ===
- Happy Chandler
- Ed Charles
- Marty Glickman
- Burleigh Grimes
- Donald Honig
- Roger Kahn
- Larry King
- Ed Linn
- Rachel Robinson
- Mack Robinson
- Horace Stoneham
- Charley Steiner
- Clyde Sukeforth
- Albert Vann
- Dick Young

== See also ==
- The Boys of Summer
- History of the Brooklyn Dodgers
