= George Gmelch =

Anthropologist and minor league baseball player

George Gmelch (born 1944 in New York) is an American anthropologist known for his research on Irish Travellers, return migration and the culture of sport. He is emeritus professor of anthropology at Union College and the University of San Francisco. Gmelch is married to fellow cultural anthropologist, and frequent collaborator, Sharon Bohn Gmelch.

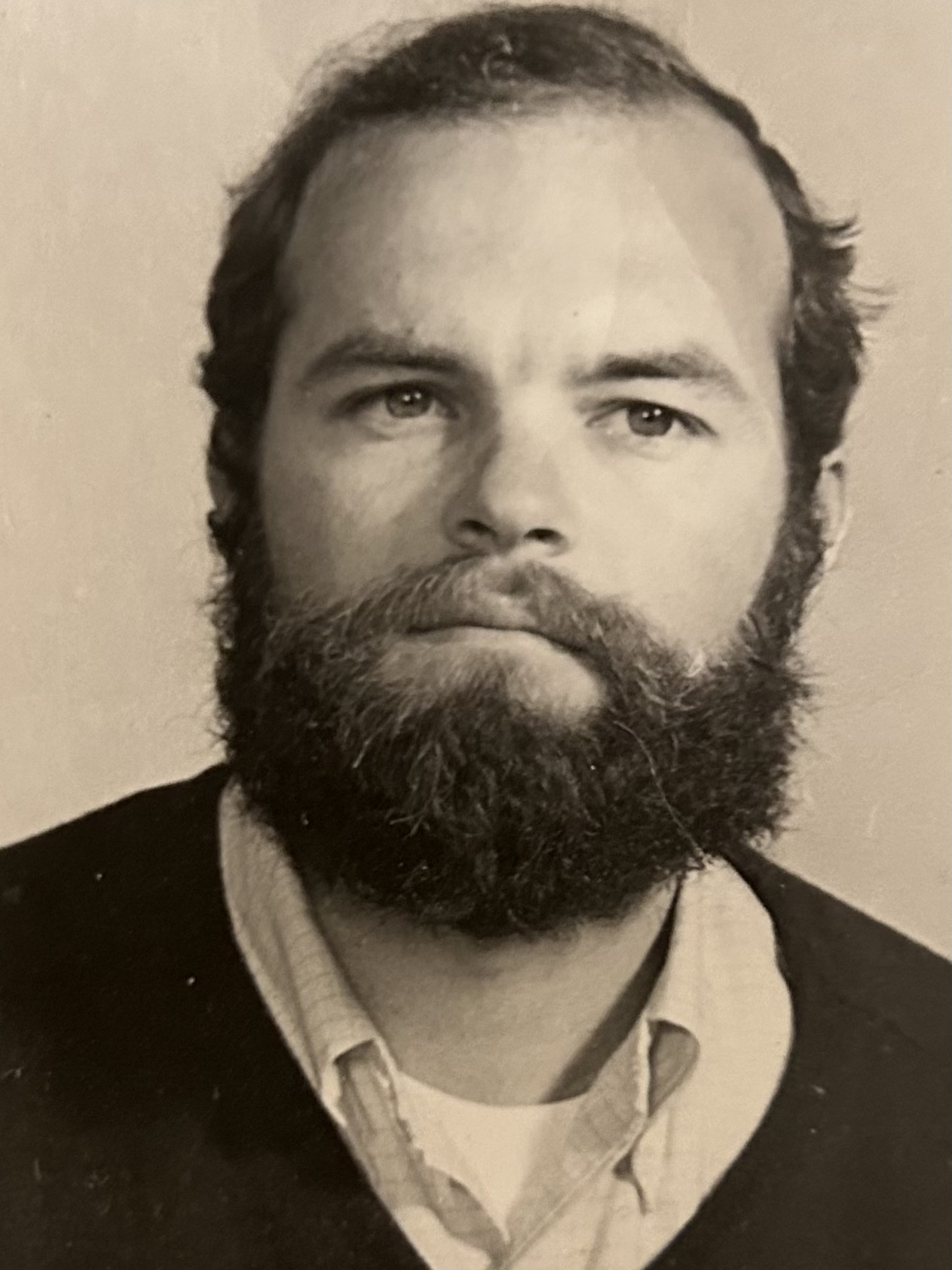
George Gmelch

== Career ==
After his sophomore year in college (1965) Gmelch signed a professional baseball contract with the Detroit Tigers. Over the next few seasons he played on four minor league teams. Political scientists Peter Dreier and Rob Elias note in their book Baseball Rebels, “...in the Carolina League towns Gmelch played in, he was shocked by the segregation and racism he observed... ... passing the general manager’s office before a game, he witnessed members of the Rocky Mount’s Chamber of Commerce reminding the ballclub’s General Manager that the town would not support the team if there were ‘too many colored boys in the starting lineup... Gmelch soon learned that the ball field itself was used by the local Ku Klux Klan for gatherings, and that the town’s police chief was a member of the Klan and his brother a Grand Dragon.

Gmelch who had been writing monthly articles about life in the minor leagues for a home town California newspaper, then wrote a piece “Life in Rocky Mount with the Klan,” describing what he had witnessed including the police chief’s involvement in the Klan. A week later Gmelch was given his unconditional release.

Gmelch would later write many pieces and several books about the culture of baseball. While still a student (Stanford and UCSB), he wrote a paper on the rituals and superstitions of ballplayers. “Baseball Magic,” a test of a well -known theory of magic (Malinowski, 1948), became the feature article in Transaction (now Society) magazine.

With In the Ballpark: The Working Lives of Baseball People (Smithsonian) Gmelch and his student J.J. Weiner wrote about the varied occupations and work of professional baseball. Subsequently, Gmelch described the culture of ballplayers in Inside Pitch: Life in Professional Baseball (Smithsonian Press) and then examined baseball cross-culturally in Baseball without Borders: An International Pastime (Nebraska). Finally, he revisited his own baseball experiences in a memoir Playing with Tigers: A Minor League Chronicle of the Sixties (Nebraska). The latter was a finalist for the Casey Award for the best baseball book of 2016.

=== Irish Travellers ===
In 1971-72, he and his anthropologist wife Sharon spent a year living in a horse-drawn wagon in a camp on the outskirts of Dublin for their PhD research. His work on this nomadic group’s adaptation to urban life was published as The Irish Tinkers: The Urbanization of an Itinerant People (1977) and in a collaboration with Sharon Gmelch in Tinkers and Travellers (1975), which won Ireland’s Book of the Year award in 1976.

The Gmelchs’ return to Ireland in 2011 to look at how Irish Traveller culture had changed was the subject of an acclaimed two-part Irish TV documentary called “Unsettled – from Tinker to Traveller”, and their book Irish Travellers: The Unsettled Life (Indiana), was published in 2014.

== Documentary films ==
With filmmaker Dennis Lanson, Gmelch has produced two films related to the remote Newfoundland fishing community of Bay de Verde where he conducted research between 2018 and 2020. The first film, “A Year in the Field,” looks at the research of a young Estonian anthropologist studying climate change in Newfoundland (2020) and is now distributed by Documentary Educational Resources (DER). The second film, “The Village at the End of the Road,” examines the aftermath of the collapse of Newfoundland’s cod fishery and its impact on the community.

== Selected books ==
Gmelch is the author and co-author of sixteen books, including In the Field: The Work and Life of Anthropology with Sharon Gmelch (University of California Press), Irish Travellers: The Unsettled Life with S Gmelch (Indiana), Double Passage: The Lives of Caribbean Migrants Abroad and Back Home (Michigan), and Tasting the Good Life: Wine Tourism in the Napa Valley with S. Gmelch (Indiana), winner of the 2012 Gourmand International Award for the best book on wine tourism.

- In the Field: The Work and Life of Anthropology. (with S. Gmelch) University of California Press, 2018
- Urban Life: Readings in the Anthropology of the City. 6/e. (with P. Kuppinger). Waveland Press, 2018
- Playing with Tigers: A Minor-League Chronicle of the Sixties. University of Nebraska Press. 2016
- Irish Travellers: The Unsettled Life (with S. Gmelch).Indiana University Press, 2014
- Tasting the Good Life: Wine Tourism in the Napa Valley. (with S. Gmelch). Indiana University Press. 2011
- Baseball without Borders: The International Pastime. University of Nebraska Press, 2006
- Inside Pitch: Life in Professional Baseball. University of Nebraska Press, 2006
- In the Ballpark: The Working Lives of Baseball People (with J. Weiner). 2/e University of Nebraska Press. 2006
- Behind the Smile, the Working Lives of Caribbean Tourism. Indiana University Press. 2003
- Inside Pitch: Life in Professional Baseball. Smithsonian Institution Press, 2001
- The Parish Behind God's Back: History and Culture in Rural Barbados (with S. Gmelch) The University of Michigan Press, 1997
- Double Passage: The Lives of Caribbean Migrants, Abroad and Back Home. The University of Michigan Press, 1992
- Urban Life: Readings in Urban Anthropology (with W. Zenner). St. Martin’s Press. 1980.
- J.M. Synge: In Wicklow, West Kerry, and Connemara (with A. Saddlemyer). Dublin: O'Brien Press; New Jersey: Rowman and Littlefield. 1980.
- To Shorten the Road: Folktales from Irish Travelling People (with B. Kroup). Toronto: Macmillan; Dublin: The O'Brien Press; New Jersey: Humanities Press. 1977.
- The Irish Tinkers: Urbanization of an Itinerant People. New York: Cummings Press /Addison-Wesley, 1977. Japanese translation published in 1994 by Gendai Shokan, Tokyo.
