= Lonnie Wheeler =

American sportswriter and author (1952 – 2020)

- Born: March 27, 1952; St. Louis, Missouri, U.S.
- Died: June 9, 2020 (aged 68); Cincinnati, Ohio, U.S.
- Education: University of Missouri (BA)
- Occupations: Sportswriter, Biographer, Author
- Spouse: Martie Kuhl
- Children: 3
- Writing career
- Notable works: I Had a Hammer (1991); Stranger to the Game (1994)

Lonnie Morrison Wheeler (March 27, 1952 – June 9, 2020) was an American sportswriter, author, and biographer who wrote primarily on baseball. He worked for The Cincinnati Enquirer and The Cincinnati Post.

Wheeler was the author of twelve books, and was known for being the co-author of the autobiographies of Baseball Hall of Famers Henry Aaron and Bob Gibson.

== Early life ==
Wheeler was born in St. Louis, Missouri to Naomi (née Epstein) and Leon Wheeler. He graduated from the University of Missouri with a bachelor's degree in journalism.

== Career ==
Wheeler was a sportswriter for The Cincinnati Enquirer in the 1970s and also wrote for The Cincinnati Post and USA Today.

He was the author of twelve books, notably co-writing the autobiography of Henry Aaron, entitled I Had a Hammer: The Hank Aaron Story, and of Bob Gibson, entitled Stranger to the Game: The Autobiography of Bob Gibson. He also co-wrote the autobiography of former Mayor of Detroit, Coleman Young.

Wheeler was the author of a biography on Negro league star and Hall of Famer Cool Papa Bell, entitled The Bona Fide Legend of Cool Papa Bell: Speed, Grace, and the Negro Leagues, and has also written books on college football and college basketball teams.

Four of his books have been nominated for the Casey Award four times: The Cincinnati Game (with John Baskin) and Bleachers in 1988, I Had A Hammer (with Henry Aaron) in 1991, and The Bona Fide Legend of Cool Papa Bell in 2021.

In 2022, Wheeler was posthumously inducted into the Greater Cincinnati Journalism Hall of Fame.

== Personal life ==
Wheeler and his wife Martie (née Kuhl) had three children together: Abby, Clark, and Emily. He died of cardiac arrest on June 9, 2020, and was survived by his wife, children, and one grandchild.

== Bibliography ==
=== Biographies ===
- I Had a Hammer: The Hank Aaron Story (with Hank Aaron) (1991)
- Stranger to The Game: The Autobiography of Bob Gibson (with Bob Gibson) (1994)
- Street Soldier: One Man's Struggle to Save a Generation, One Life at a Time (with Joseph Marshall) (2000)
- Long Shot (with Mike Piazza) (2013)
- Hard Stuff: The Autobiography of Mayor Coleman Young (with Coleman Young) (2015)
- The Bona Fide Legend of Cool Papa Bell: Speed, Grace, and the Negro Leagues (2021)

=== Miscellaneous ===
- Bleachers: A Summer in Wrigley (1988)
- The Cincinnati Game (with John Baskin) (1988)
- Blue Yonder: Kentucky, The United State of Basketball (1998)
- Schoolboy Legends: A Hundred Years of Cincinnati's Most Storied High School Football Players (with John Baskin) (2009)
- Sixty Feet, Six Inches: A Hall of Fame Pitcher & a Hall of Fame Hitter Talk About How the Game Is Played (with Bob Gibson and Reggie Jackson) (2009)
- Intangiball: The Subtle Things That Win Baseball Games (2015)
- Pitch by Pitch: My View of One Unforgettable Game (with Bob Gibson) (2015)
