= Howard Bryant =

Sports journalist and author (born 1968)

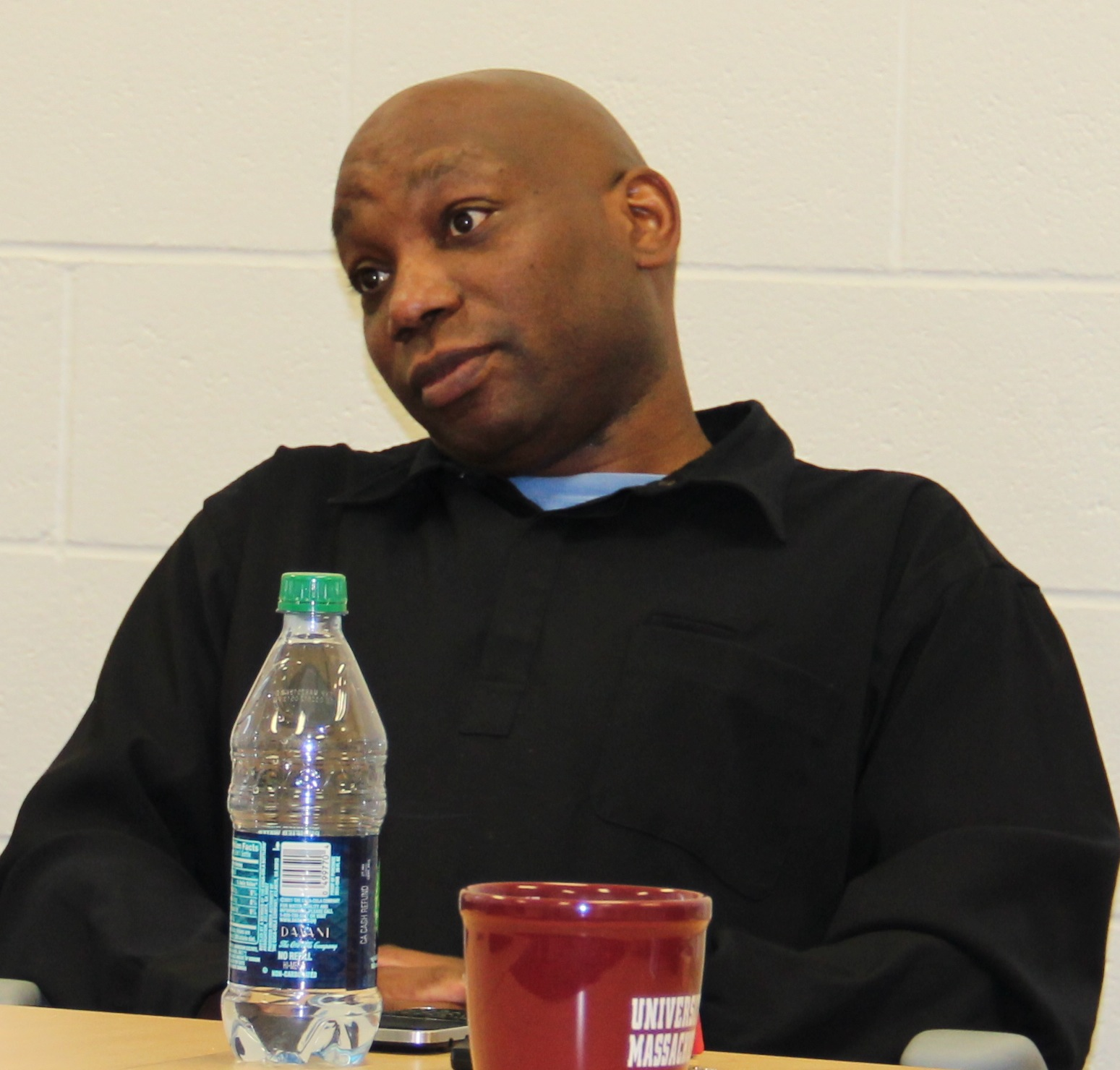
- Bryant speaking at the University of Massachusetts, 2012
- Born: November 25, 1968 (age 57); Dorchester, Massachusetts, U.S.
- Education: Temple University, '91; San Francisco State University, '93
- Occupations: Sports journalist, author, television personality
- Spouse: Veronique Paulussen (m. 2001)
- Children: 1
- Website: howardbryant.net

Howard "Howie" Bryant (born November 25, 1968) is an American sports journalist, and radio and television personality. He writes weekly columns for ESPN.com and ESPN The Magazine, ESPN, and appears regularly on ESPN Radio. He is a frequent panelist on The Sports Reporters and since 2006 has been the sports correspondent for Weekend Edition with Scott Simon on National Public Radio.

== Journalism career ==
A native of Boston, Bryant began his career in 1991 with the Oakland Tribune covering sports and technology, before moving to the San Jose Mercury News from 1995 to 2001. In San Jose, Bryant covered the telecommunications industry before returning to sports to cover the Oakland Athletics. He then reported for the Bergen Record from 2001 to 2002, covering the New York Yankees, before joining the Boston Herald as a columnist from 2002 to 2005. Bryant left the Herald for the Washington Post, where he covered the Washington Redskins from 2005 to 2007. He joined ESPN in August 2007.

== Books and film appearances ==
In 2002, Bryant published his first book, Shut Out: A Story of Race and Baseball in Boston, which won the CASEY Award for the best baseball book of 2002 and was a finalist for the Society for American Baseball Research's (SABR) Seymour Medal. In 2005, he published Juicing the Game: Drugs, Power, and the Fight for the Soul of Major League Baseball, which was New York Times Notable Book of 2005. The Last Hero: A Life of Henry Aaron was published in 2010, which also won the CASEY Award and was a New York Times Notable Book of 2010.

Bryant appeared in The Tenth Inning, Ken Burns's extension of his 1994 documentary Baseball.

Bryant was arrested in 2011 for allegedly assaulting his wife in front of their then 6-year-old son. His wife later denied that Bryant had assaulted her and he was released on personal recognizance.

== Works ==
- Shut Out: A Story of Race and Baseball in Boston (2003) ISBN 0807009792
- Juicing the Game: Drugs, Power, and the Fight for the Soul of Major League Baseball (2006) ISBN 0452287413
- The Last Hero: A Life of Henry Aaron (2010) ISBN 0307279928
- Legends series:
  - The Best Players, Games, and Teams in Football (2015) ISBN 9780147512567
  - The Best Players, Games, and Teams in Baseball (2015) ISBN 9780147512628
  - The Best Players, Games, and Teams in Basketball (2016) ISBN 9780147512574
- Sisters and Champions: The True Story of Venus and Serena Williams (2018) ISBN 9780399169069
- The Heritage: Black Athletes, a Divided America, and the Politics of Patriotism (2018) ISBN 978-080702699-1
- Full Dissidence: Notes from an Uneven Playing Field (2020) ISBN 978-0807019559
- Rickey: The Life and Legend of an American Original (2022) ISBN 0358047315
- Kings and Pawns: Jackie Robinson and Paul Robeson in America (2026) ISBN 978-0063308190
