= Sharon Bohn Gmelch =

American anthropologist and author

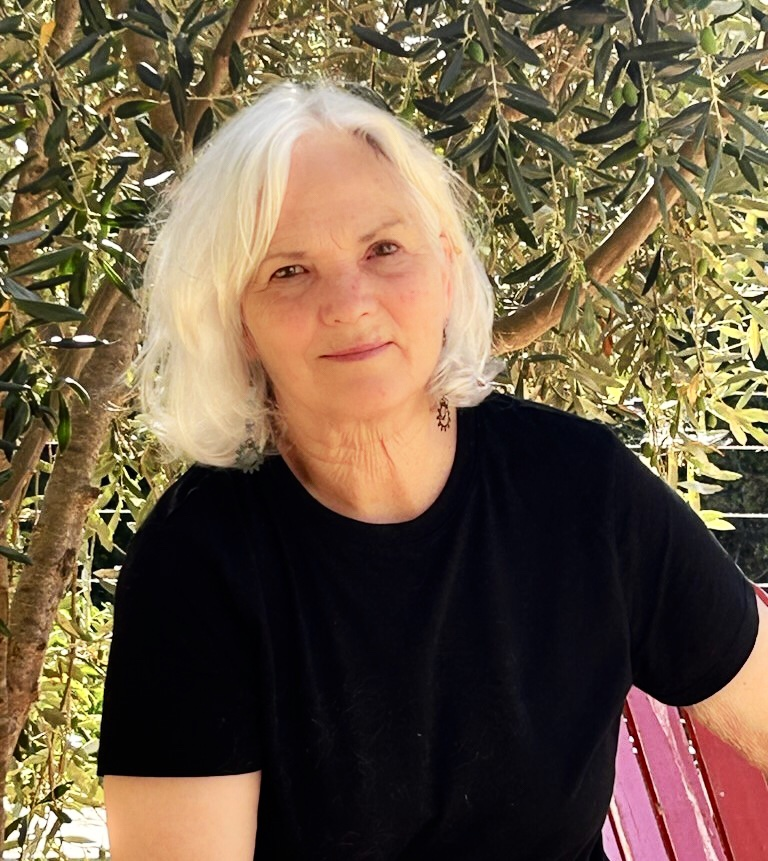
- Born: 1947 (age 78–79)

Academic background
- Education: University of California, Santa Barbara
- Thesis: The emergence and persistence of an ethnic group: the Irish 'travellers' (1974)

Academic work
- Discipline: Anthropology

Sharon Bohn Gmelch is an American cultural anthropologist best known for her research on Irish Travellers, tourism, and visual anthropology. She is married to fellow cultural anthropologist George Gmelch. She is an emeritus professor of anthropology at Union College and the University of San Francisco.

== Education and career ==
Gmelch received a B.A. (1969), M.A. (1971), and Ph.D. (1975) from the University of California, Santa Barbara. Her dissertation focused on inter-ethnic relations between the nomadic Irish Traveller community and the settled Irish society. Following her Ph.D. she was affiliated with the University of Bristol, England and subsequently the Canadian Centre for Folk Culture Studies at the National Museum of Man.

She began teaching at Union College in 1976 where she was a professor of anthropology and became the college's first director of Women's Studies. She joined the faculty of the University of San Francisco in 2008 and together with George Gmelch established and directed its Anthropology program. She has held visiting appointments at the University of Alaska, Fairbanks (1989); New Mexico State University (1988); and the National University of Ireland, Maynooth (2000–01). She retired from Union College and the University of San Francisco in 2025 and is currently professor emerita at both.

== Research ==
=== Irish Travellers and Ethnicity ===
Gmelch's early work was centered on Irish Travellers, an indigenous nomadic group in Ireland. Her first book on the topic, Tinkers and Travellers, examined the realities of Traveller life and was illustrated with photographs by Pat Langan and George Gmelch. It won Ireland's Book of Year Award in 1976. This was followed by further research over many years. A second book on Travellers, the biography of a Travelling woman, Nan: The Life of an Irish Travelling Woman, was published by W.W. Norton in 1986 and was one of three finalists for American anthropology's Margaret Mead Award. In 1981 she and George Gmelch were employed by the British Department of the Environment to examine the lives of Irish Travellers and Roma in the UK.

When she and George Gmelch returned to Ireland in 2011 to study how Travellers had changed in the 40 years since their first research, they were shadowed by an Irish documentary film crew. The two-part series, Unsettled: From Tinker to Traveller, first aired on RTE (Irish public television) in 2012. The book based on this research, Irish Travellers:The Unsettled Life, was published in 2014 by the University of Indiana Press.

=== Visual anthropology ===
Gmelch has also worked in the field of visual anthropology where her research was among the Tlingit people of southeast Alaska. First was an analysis of the work of photographer Elbridge W. Merrill who documented life in Sitka, Alaska between 1899–1929, during a period of rapid change (e.g., the government-mandated "last potlatch" of 1904; boarding school life). This research led to an historical study of all early photography of the Tlingit. The Tlingit Encounter with Photography (University of Pennsylvania Museum Press) was published in 2008. During this period, Gmelch also co-produced a documentary film with filmmaker Ellen Frankenstein on the cultural revitalization of Sitka's Tlingit. A Matter of Respect: Alaska Natives Balance the Past and Present (New Day Films, 1992) explored the Tlingits' efforts to revive their language, arts, and subsistence practices and pass them on to the younger generation. The film won several awards including a Silver Apple from the National Educational Film and Video Festival, was screened at the Margaret Mead Film Festival, and aired on PBS.

=== Tourism ===
Gmelch is the editor of the collection Tourists and Tourism, now in its fourth edition (with co-editor Adam Kaul). She has also done research on wine tourism in the Napa Valley with George Gmelch. In 2011, they published Tasting the Good Life: Wine Tourism in the Napa Valley (Indiana) which examined the history and impact of tourism in the Napa Valley, the wine "tasting" experience, and the working lives of wine and tourism workers, from vineyard field workers and winemaker to tasting room designer, tour guides and others. It won the 2012 Gourmand International Award for the best book on wine tourism.

== Selected publications ==
- Gmelch, Sharon (1986). Nan : the life of an Irish Travelling woman. New York: Norton. ISBN 978-0-393-02331-2. OCLC 13063019.
- Gmelch, Sharon; Stoffer, Marcie Heffernan; Yetzer, Jody Lynn (1998). Gender on campus : issues for college women. New Brunswick, N.J.: Rutgers University Press. ISBN 978-0-585-30057-3. OCLC 45731935.
- Gmelch, Sharon; University of Pennsylvania Museum of Archaeology and Anthropology (2008). The Tlingit encounter with photography. [Philadelphia, PA]: University of Pennsylvania Museum of Archaeology and Anthropology. ISBN 978-1-934536-10-0. OCLC 236143161.
- Gmelch, Sharon; Gmelch, George (2012). The parish behind God's back : the changing culture of rural Barbados. Long Grove, Ill.: Waveland Press. ISBN 978-1-57766-775-9. OCLC 783142357.
- Gmelch, Sharon; Gmelch, George (2014). Irish travellers : the unsettled life. Bloomington: Indiana University Press. ISBN 978-0-253-01461-0. OCLC 1051675699.
- Gmelch, George; Gmelch, Sharon (2018). In the field : life and work in cultural anthropology. Oakland, California: University of California Press. ISBN 978-0-520-96421-1. OCLC 1013519276.
- Gmelch, George; Gmelch, Sharon (2011). Tasting the good life : wine tourism in the Napa Valley. Bloomington: Indiana University Press. ISBN 978-0-253-35644-4. OCLC 670482474.
- Gmelch, Sharon; Kaul, Adam R. (2018). Tourists and tourism : a reader. Long Grove, Illinois: Waveland Press, Inc. ISBN 978-1-4786-3622-9. OCLC 1020482427.
- Gmelch, Sharon Bohn (1986). "Groups that Don't Want In: Gypsies and Other Artisan, Trader, and Entertainer Minorities". Annual Review of Anthropology. 15: 307–30. doi:10.1146/annurev.an.15.100186.001515. JSTOR 2155764.
- Gmelch, Sharon (1986). Irish life and traditions. Syracuse, N.Y., Dublin: Syracuse University Press; O'Brien Press. ISBN 978-0-8156-2367-0. OCLC 13903967.

== Reviews of work ==
- Kaprow, Miriam Lee (1988) "Review of Nan: The Life of an Irish Travelling Woman." American Anthropologist 90(2): 462–63.
- Buckley, Anthony D. (1988) "Review of Nan: The Life of an Irish Travelling Woman." Man 23(2):386.
- Brown, Mary Ellen. (1987) "Review of Nan: The Life of an Irish Travelling Woman." Journal of Folklore Research 24(2): 192.
- Taylor, Lawrence. (1991) "Review of Nan: The Life of an Irish Travelling Woman." Anthropology and Humanism Quarterly 16(1):37–38.
- Madigan, Charles (1986-08-14). "Tinker's tale of a lost Erin". Chicago Tribune. p. 59.
- Hearn, Julie (1986-10-16). "The hard life on the high road..." The Working Informer. p. 2.
- Madigan, Charles (1986-09-03). "A look at the Ireland tourists never see". Hartford Courant. p. 27.
- Hufnagel, Glenda Lewin (2000). "Review of Ms. Mentor's Impeccable Advice for Women in Academia; Shattering the Myths: Women in Academe; Gender on Campus: Issues for College Women". NWSA Journal. 12 (2): 189–93. ISSN 1040-0656. doi:10.1353/nwsa.2000.0036
- Al-Hindi, Karen Falconer (2000). "Review of Gender on Campus: Issues for College Women". Annals of the Association of American Geographers. 90 (2): 415–17. ISSN 0004-5608
- Helleiner, Jane (2016). "Review of Irish Travellers: The Unsettled Life". American Anthropologist. 118 (2): 430–31. ISSN 0002-7294
- Barber, Nelson (2014). Review of "Tasting the Good Life: Wine Tourism in the Napa Valley." Journal of Wine Research 25(2): 134–36 doi:10.1080/09571264.2014.907137
