= Mike Sowell =

American sportswriter

Mike Sowell is a sports historian and the author of three baseball books, including The Pitch That Killed about Ray Chapman and Carl Mays. Named a Notable Book of the Year by The New York Times in 1989, and winner of the CASEY Award for best baseball book of 1989, The Pitch That Killed tells the story of the only on-field fatality in major league baseball history, when the Yankees' Mays beaned the Indians' Chapman in the final weeks of the 1920 American League pennant race.

Sowell also wrote about baseball tragedies in his other books. One Pitch Away, about the 1986 baseball postseason and the key players involved, featured Donnie Moore, the Angels pitcher whose suicide two years later was linked to his role in the 1986 ALCS, and Bill Buckner, whose 20-year career was tainted by missing a ground ball in Game 6 of the World Series. Sowell's 1992 book July 2, 1903 explored the mysterious death of Hall-of-Famer Ed Delahanty, who died after being swept over Niagara Falls.

In addition to his books and articles on baseball history, Sowell wrote the text for Cardtoons, a set of baseball parody cards that led to a lawsuit with the Major League Baseball Players Association. In Cardtoons v. MLBPA, the court ruled in 1996 that the cards parodying the players and their greed were protected by the First Amendment.

Sowell, a former sportswriter for the Tulsa Tribune, is now a journalism professor at Oklahoma State University. He was inducted into the Oklahoma Journalism Hall of Fame in 2007.
