= Kostya Kennedy =

American journalist

Kennedy in 2022

Kostya Kennedy is an American journalist and author. He is VP and Editor in Chief of Premium Publishing at Dotdash Meredith, and a former senior writer and assistant managing editor at Sports Illustrated. Kennedy has written several best-selling and critically acclaimed books. He was also a staff writer at Newsday and has contributed to The New York Times and The New Yorker among many other publications.

== Biography ==
Originally from Great Neck, NY, Kennedy graduated with a BA in philosophy from Stony Brook University and a BS from the Columbia University Graduate School of Journalism, where he was awarded the distinctive Pulitzer Traveling Fellowship.

== Career ==
As VP and Editor in Chief of Premium Publishing at Dotdash Meredith, Kennedy oversees special editions across a wide range of subject areas under numerous in-house and partner brands. These include People, Time, EatingWell, Life, Entertainment Weekly, verywell, Health, Los Angeles Times, ESPN, History Channel, USA Today and many others.

A contributor and commentator on talk radio as well as on television, Kennedy has appeared on Late Night with Seth Meyers, Morning Joe, MLB Network, NPR and other news entertainment programs. He occasionally hosts public speaking engagements focusing on issues and ethics in sports and historical and current events.

At Sports Illustrated, along with writing columns, features, and cover stories, Kennedy helped found and develop several departments, including "SI Players" and "SI Adventure" and he served as the top editor of Sports Illustrated Presents, overseeing special print and digital issues devoted to the commemoration of milestones in sports.

Kennedy has also been a full professor at New York University's Tisch Institute for Sports Management, Media and Business. He previously taught journalism at NYU and Columbia University.

== Books and awards ==
Kennedy's new book, The Ride: Paul Revere and the Night that Saved America will be published by St. Martin's Press on March 25, 2025. He is the author of True: The Four Seasons of Jackie Robinson (2022, St. Martin's Press), as well as The New York Times Bestsellers Pete Rose: An American Dilemma (2014), described this way by the novelist Richard Ford: "Like the best writing about sport–Liebling, Angell–it qualifies as stirring literature" and 56: Joe DiMaggio and the Last Magic Number in Sports (2011), which was called "the best baseball book to appear in many a season," by Roger Kahn. All three of these books received the Casey Award as the best baseball book of the year. No author has won the award more often. Each was a New York Times Bestseller.

External videos
- Q&A interview with Kennedy on True, April 10, 2022, C-SPAN

His book on Rose, along with other pieces and appearances by Kennedy, including a 2014 New York Times Op-Ed piece, have played a significant role in the renewed discussion about Rose's eligibility for the National Baseball Hall of Fame.

His 2016 book Lasting Impact: One Team, One Season. What Happens When Our Sons Play Football explores the benefits and dangers of playing football in light of increased concussion awareness.

== Bibliography ==
- The Ride: Paul Revere and the Night That Saved America (2025)
- True: The Four Seasons of Jackie Robinson (2022)
  - Winner of the Casey Award for Best Baseball Book
- Lasting Impact: One Team, One Season. What Happens When Our Sons Play Football (2016)
- Pete Rose: An American Dilemma (2014)
  - Winner of the Casey Award for Best Baseball Book
  - Named one of Fortune Magazine's Favorite Books of 2014
- 56: Joe DiMaggio and the Last Magic Number in Sports (2011)
  - Winner of the Casey Award for Best Baseball Book
  - Runner-up PEN/ESPN Award for Literary Sports Writing
  - Named Best Biography at the San Francisco Book Festival

== Editor ==
- The Story of Baseball in 100 Photographs (2018)
- Sports Illustrated’s Super Bowl Gold: 50 Years of the Big Game (2015)
- Sports Illustrated Swimsuit: 50 Years of Beautiful (2013)
- Sports Illustrated’s The Hockey Book (2010)
