= Spitball (magazine) =

Baseball literary magazine

Spitball: The Literary Baseball Magazine
- Editor-in-chief: Mike Shannon
- Categories: Baseball; Poetry; Literature
- Frequency: Bi-Annual
- Founder: Mike Shannon; W. J. Harrison
- Founded: 1981
- Country: United States
- Based in: Walton, Kentucky
- Language: English
- ISSN: 8755-741X

Spitball: The Baseball Literary Magazine is a quarterly literary magazine dedicated to baseball literature. Founded by Mike Shannon and W. J. Harrison, the magazine publishes baseball poetry and short stories and also reviews baseball literature, both fiction and non-fiction.

== History ==
In late 1980, sportswriters Mike Shannon (not related to Mike Shannon, former third baseman for the St. Louis Cardinals) and W. J. "Jim" Harrison, both living in Covington, Kentucky at the time, came up with the idea of a literary baseball magazine while having lunch at Riverfront Stadium in Cincinnati, Ohio.

Initially dedicated to poetry only, the magazine expanded to include short fiction, prose, art, and book reviews. Also printed in the magazine are rare photographs, articles, and interviews with authors.

After an irregular frequency of issues, the magazine became a quarterly publication before several decades. In recent years, to save cost, it has switched to being published biannually.

== CASEY Award ==
The CASEY Award is an annual literary given out by Spitball magazine at the annual CASEY Award Banquet held in January. The award was created by Shannon and Harrison in 1983 and named after the poem "Casey at the Bat". It was created due to there being no award given to authors and publishers of distinguished baseball literature; it is considered to be the most prestigious award that can be given to a baseball book.
