= Bob Gibson =

American baseball player (1935–2020)

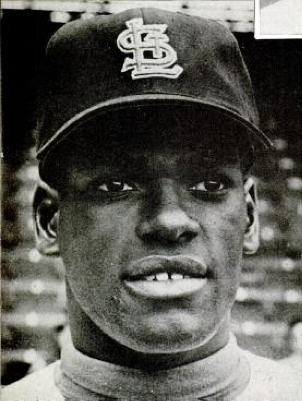
- Gibson in 1962
- Pitcher
- Born: November 9, 1935; Omaha, Nebraska, U.S.
- Died: October 2, 2020 (aged 84); Omaha, Nebraska, U.S.
- Batted: Right Threw: Right

MLB debut
- April 15, 1959, for the St. Louis Cardinals

Last MLB appearance
- September 3, 1975, for the St. Louis Cardinals

MLB statistics
- Win–loss record: 251–174
- Earned run average: 2.91
- Strikeouts: 3,117
- Stats at Baseball Reference

Teams
- St. Louis Cardinals (1959–1975)

Career highlights and awards
- 9× All-Star (1962, 1962², 1965–1970, 1972); 2× World Series champion (1964, 1967); NL MVP (1968); 2× NL Cy Young Award (1968, 1970); 2× World Series MVP (1964, 1967); 9× Gold Glove Award (1965–1973); NL wins leader (1970); MLB ERA leader (1968); NL strikeout leader (1968); Pitched a no-hitter on August 14, 1971; St. Louis Cardinals No. 45 retired; St. Louis Cardinals Hall of Fame; Major League Baseball All-Century Team

Member of the National

Baseball Hall of Fame
- Induction: 1981
- Vote: 84.0% (first ballot)

Pack Robert Gibson Jr. (November 9, 1935 – October 2, 2020), nicknamed "Gibby" and "Hoot", was an American professional baseball pitcher in Major League Baseball (MLB) who played his entire career for the St. Louis Cardinals from 1959 to 1975. Known for his fiercely competitive nature, Gibson tallied 251 wins, 3,117 strikeouts, and a 2.91 earned run average. A nine-time All-Star and two-time World Series Champion, he won two Cy Young Awards and the 1968 National League (NL) Most Valuable Player Award.

Born in Omaha, Nebraska, Gibson overcame childhood illness to excel in youth sports, particularly basketball and baseball. After briefly playing with the Harlem Globetrotters basketball team, he chose to pursue baseball and signed with the St. Louis Cardinals organization. He became a full-time starting pitcher in July 1961 and earned his first All-Star appearance in 1962. Gibson won 2 of 3 games he pitched in the 1964 World Series, then won 20 games in a season for the first time in 1965. Gibson also pitched three complete game victories in the 1967 World Series. He is one of four players and two pitchers to win multiple World Series MVPs.

The pinnacle of Gibson's career was 1968, during the "Year of the Pitcher", which is regarded as one of the greatest single pitching seasons of all-time; he posted a 1.12 ERA for the season and then recorded 17 strikeouts in Game 1 of the 1968 World Series. Gibson threw a no-hitter in 1971 but began experiencing swelling in his knee in subsequent seasons. At the time of his retirement in 1975, Gibson ranked second only to Walter Johnson among major-league pitchers in career strikeouts. When describing Gibson's career, his former all-star teammate Tim McCarver jokingly remarked, "Bob Gibson is the luckiest pitcher in baseball. He always pitches when the other team doesn't score any runs."

He was elected to the Baseball Hall of Fame in 1981, his first year of eligibility, and the Cardinals retired his uniform number 45 in September 1975, the year he retired. Gibson was later selected for the Major League Baseball All-Century Team in 1999. He died of pancreatic cancer on October 2, 2020.

== Early life ==
Gibson was born in Omaha, Nebraska, on November 9, 1935, the youngest of Victoria (née Brown) and Pack Gibson's seven children. Gibson's father died of tuberculosis three months prior to Gibson's birth, and he was named "Pack Robert Gibson", in honor of his late father. While he revered his father's legacy, Gibson disliked the name "Pack" and later legally dropped it.

Although afflicted by rickets and respiratory disease as a child, Gibson was active in sports, particularly baseball and basketball, in both informal and organized settings. Gibson's brother Josh, 15 years his senior, had a profound effect on his early life, serving as his mentor and a father figure. Gibson played on a number of youth basketball and baseball teams his brother coached, many of which were organized through the local YMCA.

Gibson attended Omaha Technical High School, where he participated on the track, basketball, and baseball teams. Gibson was named to the All-State basketball team during his senior year of high school by a newspaper in Lincoln, Nebraska, and soon after won a full athletic scholarship for basketball from Creighton University. Indiana University had rejected him after stating their "Negro athlete quota" had already been filled.

While at Creighton, Gibson majored in sociology, and continued to experience success playing basketball. At the end of his junior basketball season, he averaged 22 points per game, and made third team Jesuit All-American. As his graduation from Creighton approached, the spring of 1957 proved to be a busy time for Gibson. Aside from getting married, Gibson had garnered the interest of the Harlem Globetrotters basketball team and the St. Louis Cardinals baseball team.

Gibson eventually signed a deal which allowed him to play baseball in the Cardinals minor league system for the rest of the summer after which he would play for the Globetrotters for four months. After the four months were over, he and the Cardinals agreed on a contract which required that he would focus solely on baseball; he received a $3,000 ($34,000 today) signing bonus to sign with the team.

== Baseball career ==
=== Early struggles ===
Gibson made his pitching debut for the Omaha Cardinals of the American Association, one of the Cardinals' Triple-A affiliates. He struggled against Triple-A hitting however, recording an earned run average of 4.29 in his first ten games, including four starts. He was reassigned to the Columbus Foxes of the South Atlantic League, the team's Single-A affiliate where his performance improved a little; making eight starts, he recorded an earned run average of 3.77 for the team.

The following season, he was first assigned to the Rochester Red Wings of the International League, another Triple-A affiliate of the Cardinals. He improved significantly, recording an earned run average of 2.45 in twenty games, including eleven starts. He threw seven complete games and 103 innings. The Cardinals reassigned him to Omaha where his performance slightly worsened, with an ERA of 3.31 in eleven starts, though he did record his first professional shutout.

Gibson was assigned to the Cardinals' big league roster for the start of the 1959 season, making his Major League debut on April 15 against the Los Angeles Dodgers; he pitched two innings in relief, giving up two runs, including a home run to Jim Baxes, the very first batter he faced. Reassigned to their Omaha affiliate soon after, Gibson returned to the Major Leagues on July 30 to make his first career start; he earned his first Major League win the same day, a shutout against the Cincinnati Reds.

Gibson's experience in 1960 was similar to his first season in the majors, pitching nine innings for the Cardinals before shuffling between the Cardinals and their Rochester affiliate until mid-June. After posting a 3–6 record with a 5.61 ERA for the season, Gibson traveled to Venezuela to participate in winter baseball at the conclusion of the 1960 season. He was also sent to Puerto Rico to play for the Cangrejeros de Santurce before and after the 1961 season.

Cardinals manager Solly Hemus shuffled Gibson between the bullpen and the starting pitching rotation for the first half of the 1961 season. Years later, Gibson indicated that Hemus's racial prejudice played a major role in his misuse of Gibson, as well as of teammate Curt Flood, both of whom were told by Hemus that they would not make it as major leaguers and should try something else. Hemus was replaced as Cardinals manager in July 1961 by Johnny Keane, who had been Gibson's manager on the Omaha minor league affiliate several years prior. Keane and Gibson shared a positive professional relationship, and Keane immediately moved Gibson into the starting pitching rotation full-time. Gibson proceeded to compile an 11–6 record the remainder of the year, and posted a 3.24 ERA for the full season.

Off the field, Gibson, along with teammates Bill White and Curt Flood, started a movement to make all players live in the same clubhouse and hotel rooms. Their campaign led the St. Louis Cardinals to become the first sports team to end segregation, three years before President Lyndon B. Johnson signed the Civil Rights Act of 1964.

=== Breakthrough ===
"Don't dig in against Bob Gibson. He'll knock you down. He'd knock down his own grandmother.

Don't stare at him, don't smile at him, don't talk to him. He doesn't like it.

If you happen to hit a home run, don't run too slow and don't run too fast. If you want to celebrate get in the tunnel first.

And if he hits you, don't charge the mound because he's a Golden Gloves boxer."

— Hank Aaron's advice to teammate Dusty Baker on facing Gibson.

In late May of the 1962 season, Gibson pitched 22 2/3 consecutive scoreless innings on his way to being named an All-Star for the first time. He was named to both All-Star Games that year, pitching two innings in the second. (Note: Major League Baseball held two All-Star Games for the years from 1959 to 1962.) Despite suffering a fractured ankle late in the season, Gibson still finished 1962 with his first 200-strikeout season.

The rehabilitation of Gibson's ankle was a slow process, and by May 19 of the 1963 season he had recorded only one win. Gibson then turned to rely on his slider and two different fastball pitches to reel off six straight wins prior to late July. He and all other Major League pitchers benefited from a rule change that season which expanded the strike zone. Adding to his pitching performances was Gibson's offensive production, with his 20 RBIs outmatching the combined RBI output of entire pitching staffs on other National League teams. Even with Gibson's 18 wins and the extra motivation of teammate Stan Musial's impending retirement, however, the Cardinals finished six games out of first place.

Building on their late-season pennant run in 1963, the 1964 Cardinals developed a strong camaraderie that was noted for being free of the racial tension that predominated in the United States at that time. Part of this atmosphere stemmed from the integration of the team's spring training hotel in 1960, and Gibson and teammate Bill White worked to confront and stop use of racial slurs within the team. On August 23, the Cardinals were 11 games behind the Philadelphia Phillies and remained six-and-a-half games behind on September 21. The combination of a nine-game Cardinals winning streak and a ten-game Phillies losing streak then brought the season down to the final game. The Cardinals faced the New York Mets, and Gibson entered the game as a relief pitcher in the fifth inning. Aware that the Phillies were ahead of the Cincinnati Reds 4–0 at the time he entered the game, Gibson proceeded to pitch four innings of two-hit relief, while his teammates scored 11 runs of support to earn the victory.

They next faced the New York Yankees in the 1964 World Series. Gibson was matched against Yankees starting pitcher Mel Stottlemyre for three of the Series' seven games, with Gibson losing Game 2, then winning Game 5. In Game 7, Gibson, who only had 2 days rest, pitched into the ninth inning, where he allowed home runs to Phil Linz and Clete Boyer, making the score 7–5 Cardinals. With Ray Sadecki and Barney Schultz warming up in the Cardinal bullpen, Gibson retired Bobby Richardson for the final out, giving the Cardinals their first World Championship since 1946. Along with his two victories, Gibson set a new World Series record by striking out 31 batters.

Gibson made the All-Star team again in the 1965 season, and when the Cardinals were well out of the pennant race by August, attention turned to Gibson to see if he could win 20 games for the first time. Gibson was still looking for win number 20 on the last day of the season, a game where new Cardinals manager Red Schoendienst rested many of the regular players. Gibson still prevailed against the Houston Astros by a score of 5–2.

The 1966 season marked the opening of Busch Memorial Stadium for the Cardinals and Gibson was selected to play in the All-Star Game in front of the hometown crowd, though he did not as he was hurt at the time.

The Cardinals built a 3 1/2-game lead prior to the 1967 season All-Star break, and Gibson pitched the seventh and eighth innings of the 1967 All-Star game. Gibson then faced the Pittsburgh Pirates on July 15, when Roberto Clemente hit a line drive off Gibson's right leg. Unaware his leg had been fractured, Gibson faced three more batters before his right fibula bone snapped above the ankle. After Gibson returned on September 7, the Cardinals secured the National League pennant on September 18, 10 1/2 games ahead of the San Francisco Giants.

In the 1967 World Series against the Boston Red Sox, Gibson allowed only three earned runs and 14 hits over three complete-game victories in Games 1, 4 (five-hit shutout), and 7, the latter two marks tying Christy Mathewson's 1905 World Series record. Just as he had in 1964, Gibson pitched a complete-game victory in Game 7, against Cy Young winner Jim Lonborg, who pitched a one-hitter in Game 2. Gibson also contributed offensively in Game 7 by hitting a home run that made the game 3–0. Unlike his last win as World Series MVP, he finally got the endorsements that had eluded him in 1964, including endorsement and sponsorship for his asthma medication, namely Primatene mist inhaler and tablets.

=== 1968: Year of the Pitcher ===
The 1968 season became known as "The Year of the Pitcher", and Gibson was at the forefront of pitching dominance. His earned run average was 1.12, a live-ball era record, as well as the major league record in 300 or more innings pitched. It was the lowest major league ERA since Dutch Leonard's 0.96 mark 54 years earlier. Additionally, Gibson threw 13 shutouts.

Gibson won all 12 starts in June and July, pitching a complete game every time, (eight of which were shutouts), and allowed only six earned runs in 108 innings pitched (a 0.50 ERA). Gibson pitched 47 consecutive scoreless innings during this stretch, at the time the fourth-longest scoreless streak in major league history. He also struck out 91 batters, and he won two consecutive NL Player of the Month awards. Gibson finished the season with 28 complete games out of 34 games started. Of the games he didn't complete, he was pinch-hit for, meaning Gibson was not removed from the mound for another pitcher for the entire season.

Gibson won the National League MVP Award. With Denny McLain winning the American League's Most Valuable Player award, 1968 remains, to date, the only year both MVP Awards went to pitchers, with McLain compiling a 31–6 record for the Detroit Tigers.

Gibson lost nine games against 22 wins, despite his record-setting low 1.12 ERA, as the feeble batting throughout baseball included his own team. The 1968 Cardinals had one .300 hitter, while the team-leading home run and RBI totals were just 16 and 79, respectively. Of his nine losses, two were 1–0 games, one of which was against San Francisco Giants pitcher Gaylord Perry's no-hitter on September 17. The Giants' run in that game came on a first-inning home run by light-hitting Ron Hunt, one of only 11 that Gibson allowed in 304 2/3 innings.

In Game 1 of the 1968 World Series against the Detroit Tigers, Gibson struck out 17 batters, setting a World Series record for strikeouts in one game and breaking Sandy Koufax's record of 15 set in Game 1 of the 1963 World Series. He also joined Ed Walsh as the only pitchers to strike out at least one batter in each inning of a World Series game, Walsh having done so in Game 3 of the 1906 World Series. After allowing a leadoff single to Mickey Stanley in the ninth inning, Gibson finished the game by striking out Tiger sluggers Al Kaline, Norm Cash, and Willie Horton in succession.

Gibson next pitched in Game 4, winning the game by a score of 10–1, beating Tigers' ace Denny McLain. The teams continued to battle each other, setting the stage for another winner-take-all Game 7 in St. Louis on October 10, 1968. In this game Gibson was matched against Tigers pitcher Mickey Lolich and the two proceeded to hold their opponents scoreless for the first six innings. In the top of the seventh, Gibson retired the first two batters before allowing two consecutive singles. Detroit batter Jim Northrup then hit a two-run triple over the head of center fielder Curt Flood, leading to Detroit's Series win.

The overall pitching statistics in the 1968 season, led by Gibson and McLain's record-setting performances, are often cited as one of the reasons for Major League Baseball's decision to alter pitching-related rules. Sometimes known as the "Gibson rules", Major League Baseball lowered the pitcher's mound in 1969 from 15 inches (380 mm) to 10 inches (250 mm) – though teams had rarely followed this rule nor was it enforced by the league – and reduced the height of the strike zone from the batter's armpits to the jersey letters.

=== Final years ===
Aside from the rule changes set to take effect in 1969, cultural and monetary influences increasingly began impacting baseball, as evidenced by nine players from the Cardinals' 1968 roster who had not reported by the first week of spring training due to the status of their contracts. On February 4, 1969, Gibson appeared on The Tonight Show Starring Johnny Carson, and said the Major League Baseball Players Association (MLBPA) had suggested players consider striking before the upcoming season began. Gibson himself had no immediate contract worries, as the $125,000 salary Gibson requested for 1969 was agreed to by team owner Gussie Busch and the Cardinals, setting a new franchise record for the highest single-season salary.

Despite the significant rule changes, Gibson's status as one of the league's best pitchers was not immediately affected. In 1969, he went 20–13 with a 2.18 ERA, 4 shutouts, and 28 complete games. On May 12, 1969, Gibson struck out three batters on nine pitches in the seventh inning of a 6–2 win over the Los Angeles Dodgers. Gibson became the ninth National League pitcher and the 15th pitcher in Major League history to throw an immaculate inning. After pitching into the tenth inning of the July 4 game against the Cubs, Gibson was removed from a game without finishing an inning for the first time in more than 60 consecutive starts, a streak spanning two years. Gibson set another mark, on August 16, when he became the third pitcher in Major League history to reach the 200-strikeout plateau in seven different seasons.

Gibson experienced an up-and-down 1970 season, marked at the low point by a July slump where he resorted to experimenting with a knuckleball for the first time in his career. Just as quickly, Gibson returned to form, starting a streak of seven wins on July 28, and pitching all 14 innings of a 5–4 win against the San Diego Padres on August 12. He would go on to win his fourth and final NL Player of the Month award for August (6–0, 2.31 ERA, 55 SO). Gibson won 23 games in 1970, and was once again named the NL Cy Young Award winner.

Gibson achieved two highlights in August 1971. On the 4th, he defeated the Giants 7–2 at Busch Memorial Stadium for his 200th career victory. Ten days later, he threw a no-hitter against the Pittsburgh Pirates, beating the eventual World Champions by a score of 11–0 at Three Rivers Stadium. Along the way, he registered 10 strikeouts, including the game's final out. Gibson also drove in three runs, one on a fifth-inning sacrifice fly and two on an eighth-inning single, to help his own cause. The no-hitter was the first in Pittsburgh since Nick Maddox at Exposition Park in 1907; none had been pitched in the 62-year history of Three Rivers Stadium's predecessor, Forbes Field.

Gibson started the 1972 season by going 0–5. However, he would end the season with 19 wins and recording his ninth and final 200-strikeout season. He also made his final All-Star appearance. On June 21, against the San Diego Padres, he broke Jesse Haines's club record for most wins.

During the summer of 1974, Gibson felt hopeful he could put together a winning streak, but he continually encountered swelling in his knee. Despite his struggles, on July 17 of that season, he became the second pitcher in Major League Baseball history, after Walter Johnson, to strike out more than 3,000 batters and the first to do so in the National League; the strikeout victim was César Gerónimo of the Cincinnati Reds.

In January 1975, Gibson announced he would retire at the end of the 1975 season, admitting later on that he only continued to play baseball in order to cope with his recent divorce from his ex-wife, Charline. During his final season, Gibson went 3–10 with a 5.04 earned run average.

== Career overall ==
=== Statistics and achievements ===
From 1963 to 1970, Gibson posted a win–loss record of 156–81, for a .658 winning percentage. He won nine Gold Glove Awards, the National League Cy Young Award in 1968 and 1970, and the National League MVP Award in 1968. His 1.12 earned run average and 13 shutouts in 1968 are both records in the live-ball era.

In his career, Gibson had a win-loss record of 251–174 with an ERA of 2.91. Across 482 games started, he pitched 56 shutouts and 255 complete games, striking out 3,117 batters in 3,884 1/3 innings pitched. He holds the Cardinals franchise pitching records for wins, games started, complete games, shutouts, innings pitched, and strikeouts.

As a hitter, he had a lifetime batting average of .206 with 24 home runs and 144 runs batted in. Gibson was sometimes used by the Cardinals as a pinch-hitter, and in 1970 he hit .303 for the season in 109 at-bats, which was over 100 points higher than teammate Dal Maxvill.

Gibson is considered one of the greatest postseason pitchers in baseball history. Across three World Series and nine games started, he had a record of 7–2 with a 1.89 ERA and 92 strikeouts. He became the second player, after Sandy Koufax, to win two World Series MVP awards, receiving the honor in 1964 and 1967.

In 1964, he set a World Series record for most strikeouts in a seven-game World Series with 31, a record he broke in 1968 when he recorded 35, including a record 17 strikeouts in Game 1. Additionally, Gibson is one of two pitchers, the other being Dave McNally, to hit two home runs in World Series play, hitting one each in the 1967 and 1968 World Series.

Category	W	L	ERA	GS	CG	SHO	SV	IP	H	R	ER	HR	BB	IBB	SO	HBP	WHIP	FIP	ERA+	H/9	SO/9	Ref.
Total	251	174	2.91	482	255	56	6	3,884.1	3,279	1,420	1,258	257	1,336	118	3,117	102	1.188	2.89	127	7.6	7.2	

=== Pitching style and reputation ===
"Bob Gibson pitches as though he's double parked."

— Vin Scully

Gibson was a quick worker on the mound with an explosive delivery, falling towards first base each time he released the ball. He relied on pinpoint control and had a low, three-quarter arm angle. His repertoire consisted of a slider and both a two-seam fastball and a four-seam fastball.

He was a fierce competitor who was known to throw brushback pitches to establish dominance over the strike-zone and intimidate the batter, similar to his contemporary and fellow Hall of Famer Don Drysdale. However, he rarely hit batters deliberately; compared to Drysdale, who hit 154 batters in his career, Gibson hit only 102 despite facing more batters. Additionally, Drysdale led the league in hit batsmen five times, while Gibson never did; only once did he finish in the top three.

While he gained a reputation for being intimidating, Gibson often pushed back on stories by contemporaries about him as being exaggerated, saying that he made no concerted effort to be intimidating. He once joked that the only reason he glared while pitching was because of his poor eyesight and inability to see the catcher's signals clearly as he did not wear glasses while pitching.

Gibson was also known to avoid fraternizing with opposing players. At the 1965 All-Star Game, Milwaukee Braves catcher Joe Torre caught Gibson in the 9th inning; afterwards, when he complimented Gibson's pitching, the latter ignored him and merely got dressed and left. He could also, on occasion, be brusque with his teammates, particularly his catchers. When Tim McCarver once went to the mound for a conference, Gibson brushed him off, saying "The only thing you know about pitching is that it's hard to hit."

== Post-playing career ==
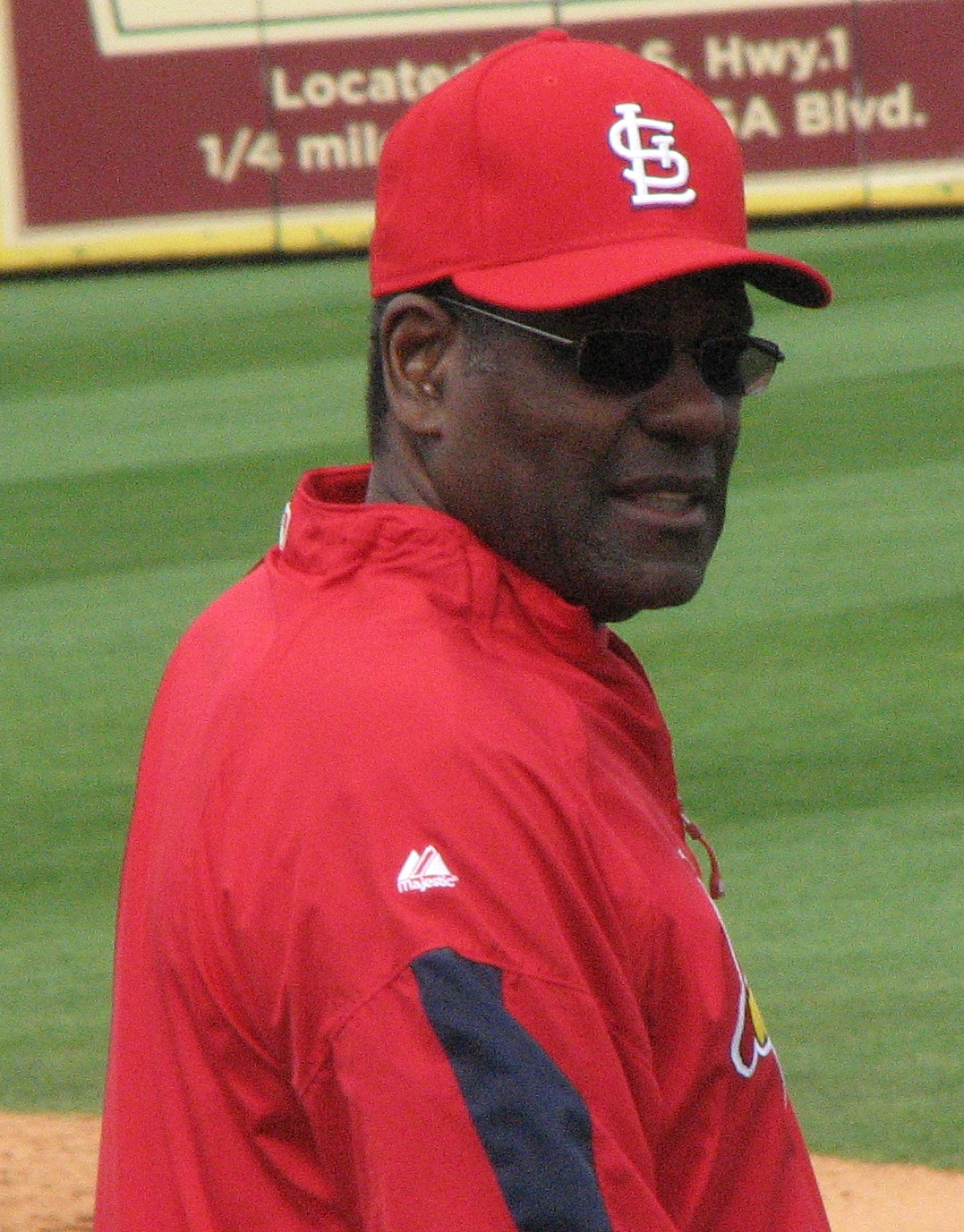
Gibson during spring training in 2010

Before Gibson returned to his home in Omaha at the end of the 1975 season, Cardinals general manager Bing Devine offered him an undefined job, contingent on approval from higher-ranking club officials. Unsure of his future career path, Gibson declined the offer. The Cardinals never offered him a job again. He later said: "I've often thought how different my life would have been if I had said 'yes' that day."

During the 1975 offseason, Gibson used the motor home the Cardinals had given him as a retirement gift to travel across the western United States. He returned to Omaha, where he served as chairman of the board of directors for the Community National Bank, a local bank that served the city's African-American community. He became the principal investor in the radio station KOWH. He also started Gibson's Spirits and Sustenance restaurant, sometimes working 12-hour days as its owner/operator. Gibson was briefly a television color commentator for the New York Nets of the American Basketball Association.

Gibson returned to baseball in 1981, accepting a coaching job from New York Mets manager Joe Torre, a former teammate with the Cardinals. Torre called Gibson an "attitude coach", the first such title in Major League history. Torre and his coaching staff were let go at the end of the 1981 season. Torre moved on to manage the Atlanta Braves in 1982, hiring Gibson as a pitching coach. The Braves proceeded to challenge for the National League pennant for the first time since 1969, ultimately losing to the Cardinals in the 1982 National League Championship Series. Gibson remained with Torre on the Braves' coaching staff until the end of the 1984 season.

Gibson then took to hosting a pre- and postgame show for Cardinals baseball games on radio station KMOX from 1985 until 1989. He also served as color commentator for baseball games on ESPN in 1990; he declined an option to continue the position because he would have to spend too much time away from his family. In 1995, Gibson again served as pitching coach on a Torre-led staff, this time returning to the Cardinals.

In 2009, with the help of sportswriter Lonnie Wheeler, he and fellow Hall of Famer Reggie Jackson wrote a book titled Sixty Feet, Six Inches: A Hall of Fame Pitcher & a Hall of Fame Hitter Talk About How the Game Is Played. Gibson wrote another book, also with Wheeler, titled Pitch by Pitch: My View of One Unforgettable Game; published in 2015, it described Game 1 of the 1968 World Series from his point of view.

== Honors ==
Bob Gibson's number 45 was retired by the St. Louis Cardinals in 1975.

Gibson's jersey number 45 was retired by the St. Louis Cardinals on September 1, 1975. In 1981, he was elected to the Baseball Hall of Fame on his first ballot.

In 1999, he was ranked number 31 on The Sporting News' list of the 100 Greatest Baseball Players, and was elected to the Major League Baseball All-Century Team. In 2020, The Athletic ranked Gibson at number 45 on its "Baseball 100" list, complied by sportswriter Joe Posnanski.

Gibson was named as one of (then) thirteen "Black Aces", a select few African-American pitchers who had a 20-win season in the Major Leagues, by former pitcher Mudcat Grant in a book he had authored called The Black Aces: Baseball's Only African-American Twenty-Game Winners.

In 2022, as part of their SN Rushmore project, The Sporting News named Gibson on their "St. Louis Mount Rushmore of Sports", along with fellow Cardinals Stan Musial and Albert Pujols, and St. Louis Blues hockey player Brett Hull.

He has a star on the St. Louis Walk of Fame. A bronze statue of Gibson by Harry Weber is located in front of Busch Stadium, commemorating Gibson along with other St. Louis Cardinals greats. Another statue of Gibson was unveiled outside of Werner Park in Gibson's home city, Omaha, Nebraska, in 2013. The street on the north side of Rosenblatt Stadium, former home of the College World Series in his hometown of Omaha, is named Bob Gibson Boulevard.

In January 2014, the Cardinals announced Gibson as among 22 former players and personnel who made up the inaugural class of St. Louis Cardinals Hall of Fame Museum.

== Personal life ==
Gibson was married twice and was the father of three children. With his first wife, Charline (née Johnson), he had a son named Ray (Note: Ray was born Renee Gibson; he was assigned female at birth and came out as a trans man in his fifties.) and a daughter named Annette. With his second wife, Wendy (née Nelson), he had a son named Christopher.

During his teenage years, Gibson's eyesight deteriorated severely and necessitated the use of eyeglasses. However, he never wore glasses when in uniform or while pitching; catcher Tim McCarver would paint his finger nails to enable Gibson to be able to see signs. Gibson's former teammate Bill White, while with the San Francisco Giants, recalled taking Gibson to meet Willie Mays; Mays did not immediately recognize Gibson as the latter was wearing his glasses at the time.

During his career and in retirement, Gibson continued to live in his hometown of Omaha, Nebraska. This was due to a discriminatory housing policy in St. Louis during his playing career which made it extremely difficult for him to buy a house in the city.

Gibson hosted an annual golf tournament in Omaha for 12 years, called the 'Bob Gibson All-Star Classic', raising millions of dollars for local and national charities. He also sat on the Board of Directors of the Baseball Assistance Team (B.A.T.), an organization that provides aid to retired, financially struggling former ballplayers.

In 2002, Gibson was involved in a road rage incident with a man named Miguel Sanchez. Both Gibson and Sanchez were cited by the police for third-degree assault after they got into a fistfight at a gas station.

=== Illness and death ===
In July 2019, Gibson's longtime agent Dick Zitzmann announced that Gibson had been diagnosed with pancreatic cancer several weeks earlier and was due to begin chemotherapy. He died on October 2, 2020, at age 84, under hospice care after fighting cancer for more than a year.

Following his death, Cardinal fans paid their respect to Gibson at his statue at Busch Stadium. The following season, the team honored Gibson by wearing a "45" memorial patch on their uniforms and holding "Bob Gibson Day" on August 22, with former teammates and his family attending the pregame memorial ceremony.

Gibson's funeral was held privately in Omaha, Nebraska, with only his immediate surviving family attending. His body was interred at Evergreen Memorial Park in Omaha.

== See also ==
- Major League Baseball titles leaders
- List of St. Louis Cardinals team records
- List of Gold Glove Award winners at pitcher
- List of Major League Baseball annual ERA leaders
- List of Major League Baseball annual wins leaders
- List of Major League Baseball annual strikeout leaders
- List of Major League Baseball annual shutout leaders
- List of Major League Baseball career strikeout leaders
- List of Major League Baseball career shutout leaders
- List of Major League Baseball career wins leaders
- List of Major League Baseball career hit batsmen leaders
- List of Major League Baseball career putouts as a pitcher
- List of Major League Baseball no-hitters
- List of Major League Baseball all-time leaders in home runs by pitchers
- List of Major League Baseball players who spent their entire career with one franchise
- List of Major League Baseball pitchers who have thrown an immaculate inning
- List of Major League Baseball single-inning strikeout leaders
- List of World Series starting pitchers

== Notes ==
Awards and achievements
Preceded by Ernie Broglio; Curt Simmons	St. Louis Cardinals Opening Day; Starting Pitcher; 1965; 1967–1975	Succeeded by Curt Simmons; Lynn McGlothen
Preceded by Rick Wise	No-hitter pitcher August 14, 1971	Succeeded by Burt Hooton
Preceded by Frank Robinson; Don Drysdale; Bill Singer	Major League Baseball Player of the Month; September 1964; June & July 1968; August 1970	Succeeded by Joe Torre; Pete Rose; Willie Stargell
Sporting positions
Preceded by Cloyd Boyer	Atlanta Braves pitching coach 1982–1984	Succeeded by Leo Mazzone
Preceded by Joe Coleman	St. Louis Cardinals pitching coach 1995	Succeeded by Dave Duncan
