= The Pitch That Killed =

1989 book by Mike Sowell

The Pitch That Killed: Carl Mays, Ray Chapman and the Pennant Race of 1920
- Author: Mike Sowell
- Language: English
- Subject: Ray Chapman; Carl Mays
- Genre: Baseball history
- Publisher: Macmillan
- Publication date: 1989
- Publication place: United States
- ISBN: 978-0026124102

The Pitch That Killed: Carl Mays, Ray Chapman and the Pennant Race of 1920 is a non-fiction baseball book written by Mike Sowell and published in 1989. The book concentrates on the 1920 major league season, especially the events surrounding Ray Chapman's death from a pitch thrown by Carl Mays.

It won the CASEY Award for best baseball book of 1989 and was selected as a New York Times "Notable Book of the Year."

Come Aboard Productions optioned the film rights to Mike Sowell's book in 2013. In 2020, Los Angeles–based Bronson Park Films and SMA Creative acquired the documentary rights with Come Aboard Productions co-producing the project. Believeland director Andrew Billman is helming the documentary film titled War on the Diamond. The project is filming in 2021 with a planned Fall 2022 release.
