= John Rosengren =

American writer and author (born 1964)

- Born: July 24, 1964 (age 62); Minneapolis, Minnesota, U.S.
- Education: Saint John's University (BA); Boston University (MA)
- Occupations: Author, journalist
- Spouse: Maria Rosengren
- Children: 2
- Writing career
- Notable works: Hammerin' Hank, George Almighty, and the Say Hey Kid (2008); The Fight of Their Lives (2014)
- Website: johnrosengren.net

John Rosengren (born July 24, 1964) is an American award-winning writer and journalist, and the author of ten books, mostly on sports.

== Personal life ==
Rosengren was born in Minneapolis, Minnesota on July 24, 1964. He holds a master's degree in creative writing from Boston University and a bachelor's degree from Saint John's University.

He and his wife Maria have two children; a daughter, Alison, and a son, Brendan. They reside in Minneapolis.

== Career ==
His feature articles, profiles and essays have appeared in more than 100 publications, including The Atlantic, GQ, The New Yorker, and Sports Illustrated. He has written eight non-fiction books, mostly on sports, as well as two works of fiction.

He wrote a book called Blades of Glory which followed the Jefferson High School boys hockey team in Bloomington, Minnesota and their 2000-2001 championship season.

Notably, Rosengren has written a well-received biography on Jewish Baseball Hall of Famer Hank Greenberg, Hank Greenberg: The Hero of Heroes. He was the author of Esera Tuaolo's autobiography, entitled Alone in the Trenches: My Life as a Gay Player in the NFL.

Rosengren has won numerous awards for his books and magazine articles. His 10,000-word exposé in The Atlantic, entitled "How Casinos Enable Gambling Addicts" won the 2017 Donald Robinson Award for Investigative Journalism and was nominated for a National Magazine Award and a Pulitzer Prize.

Two of his books were finalists for the Casey Award: Hammerin’ Hank, George Almighty and the Say Hey Kid: The Year that Changed Baseball Forever, an account of the 1973 Major League Baseball season, in 2008; and The Fight of Their Lives, an account of the infamous 1965 incident between Juan Marichal and John Roseboro and its aftermath, in 2014.

In October 2020, Rosengren published The Pretender in Atavist Magazine revolving around the murders committed by Lois Riess. Rosengren served as co-executive producer and appeared in the documentary I Am Not a Monster: The Lois Riess Murders directed by Erin Lee Carr, for HBO.

== Bibliography ==
=== Novels/Short stories ===
- Life Is Just a Party: Portrait of a Teenage Partier (1989)
- A Clean Heart (2020)

=== Biographies ===
- Alone in the Trenches: My Life as a Gay Man in the NFL (with Esera Tuaolo) (2006)
- Hank Greenberg: The Hero of Heroes (2013)

=== Others ===
- Meeting Christ in Teens: Startling Moments of Grace (2002)
- Big Book Unplugged: A Guide to Alcoholics Anonymous (2003)
- Blades of Glory: The True Story of a Young Team Bred to Win (2003)
- Hammerin' Hank, George Almighty and the Say Hey Kid: The Year that Changed Baseball Forever (2008)
- The Fight of Their Lives: How Juan Marichal and John Roseboro Turned Baseball's Ugliest Brawl into a Story of Forgiveness and Redemption (2014)
- Classic Baseball: Timeless Tales, Immortal Moments (2022)
