= Marty Appel =

American executive and author

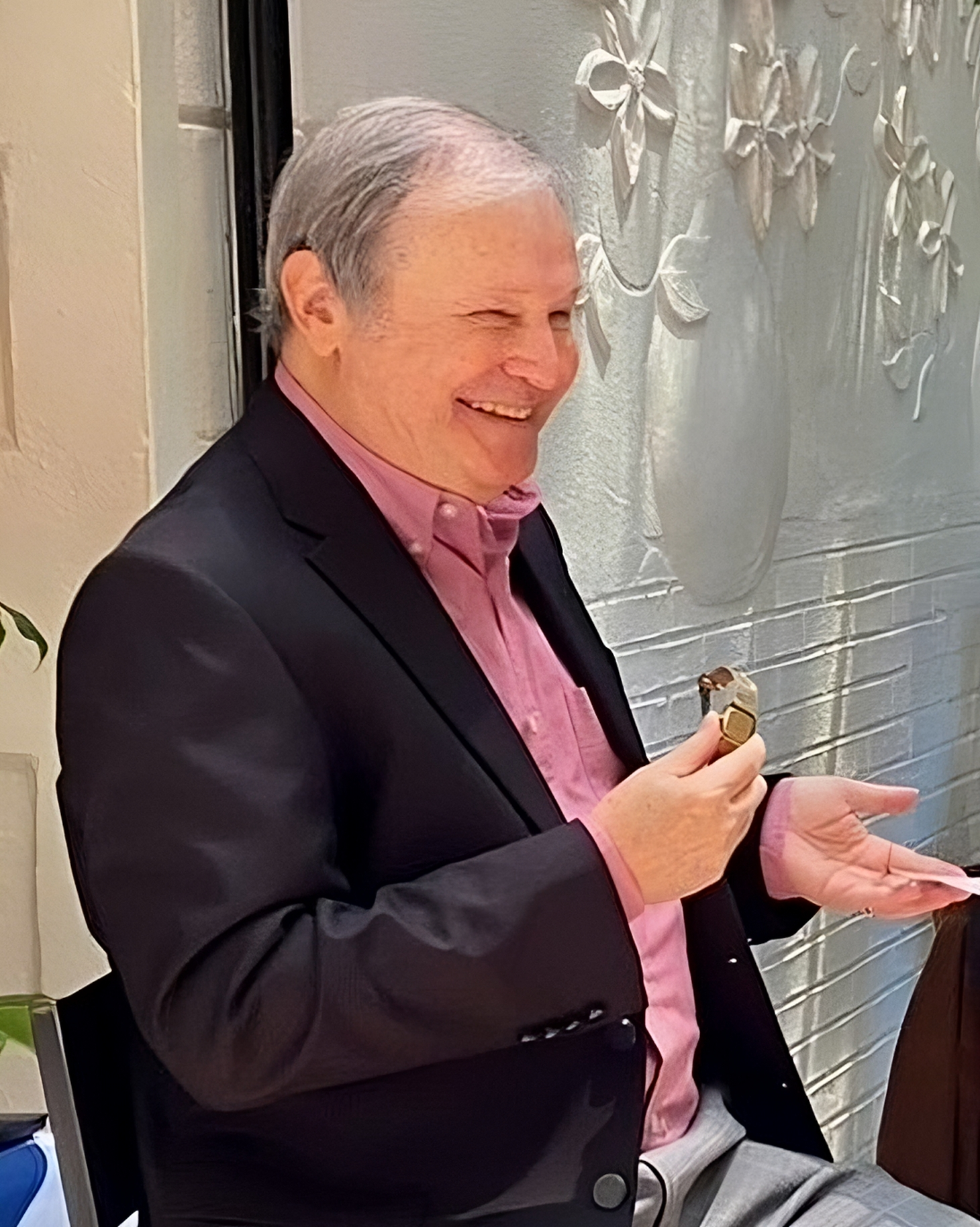
- Born: Martin E. Appel; August 7, 1948 (age 78); Brooklyn, New York, U.S.
- Education: State University of New York at Oneonta (1970)
- Occupations: public relations and sports management executive, television executive producer, and author
- Years active: 1968–present
- Known for: Public Relations Director of the New York Yankees
- Notable work: Casey Stengel: Baseball's Greatest Character; Munson: The Life and Death of a Yankee Captain; Pinstripe Empire: The New York Yankees from Before the Babe to After the Boss
- Board member of: Yogi Berra Museum and Learning Center; New York Sports Museum and Hall of Fame
- Spouse: Lourdes Appel
- Children: 2
- Website: appelpr.com

Martin E. Appel (born August 7, 1948) is an American public relations and sports management executive, television executive producer, baseball historian and author.

Appel served as Public Relations Director for the New York Yankees from 1973 to 1977. He has written over 20 books, including Pinstripe Empire: The New York Yankees from Before the Babe to After the Boss and Casey Stengel: Baseball’s Greatest Character. Appel is a two-time winner of the Casey Award for Best Baseball Book of the Year, for his biographies of King Kelly and Casey Stengel.

== Early life and education ==
Appel was born in Brooklyn, New York to Irving and Celia Appel.

He graduated from the State University of New York at Oneonta in 1970. He obtained a degree in political science and journalism.

== Career ==
=== Sports public relations and management ===
Appel began his career in baseball while a student, after writing to then-New York Yankees public relations chief Bob Fishel. Appel began his tenure with the Yankees in 1968 at age 19, handling fan mail for Mickey Mantle. In 1970, he became at 21 the Yankees Assistant Public Relations Director. He was named Public Relations Director of the team in 1973 by Yankee owner George Steinbrenner, becoming at 23 the youngest PR Director in Major League Baseball history, and remained in that position for four years.

After resigning in early 1977, and starting a sports management company, Appel handled public relations for the New York Apples of World Team Tennis, a team featuring Billie Jean King and Vitas Gerulaitis. When the league folded, he joined the staff of Major League Baseball Commissioner Bowie Kuhn.

In addition, Appel worked for the Atlanta Committee for the Olympic Games, The Topps Company, and assisted in handling public relations for the Israel national baseball team in the 2013 World Baseball Classic – Qualifier 1.

Appel was the president of Marty Appel Public Relations, a New York-based public relations firm specializing in sports that he established in 1998. The PR agency included mostly sports clients, but it also had clients in fields such as publishing, medicine, and not-for-profit.

In 2007, Appel led the public relations efforts for the short-lived Israel Baseball League which debuted and shut down that same year.

=== Television ===
While serving as VP for Public Relations for New York City television station WPIX, Appel won an Emmy Award as the executive producer of Yankee telecasts, a position he held for 11 years until 1992. He also produced pre-season football telecasts for the New York Giants and New York Jets.

Appel was an adviser to the production of the ESPN miniseries The Bronx is Burning, and a consultant to the 2001 HBO production 61*, directed by Billy Crystal.

== Writing career ==
Appel has written over 20 books, including a biography of baseball player King Kelly, and children's biographies of Yankees Yogi Berra and Joe DiMaggio. He ghostwrote autobiographical books for umpire Eric Gregg, TV and radio talk show host Larry King, baseball commissioner Bowie Kuhn, baseball executive Lee MacPhail, and baseball players Thurman Munson (Thurman Munson: An Autobiography) and Tom Seaver, and wrote a biography of Munson (Munson: The Life and Death of a Yankee Captain) published in 2009 and became a New York Times bestseller. His Now Pitching for the Yankees (2002) was ESPN's best New York baseball book of the year.

Appel's Pinstripe Empire: The New York Yankees from Before the Babe to After the Boss, published in 2012, was the first narrative history of the team since Frank Graham's 1943 book, The New York Yankees: An Informal History. Former Yankee and author Jim Bouton described the book, in The New York Times, as: "good writing ... an insider’s history enlivened by a rich store of carefully researched anecdotes, most of which I’d never heard before ... a marvelous book to take on vacation." Appel also wrote a children's version, Pinstripe Pride.

In 2017, he published Casey Stengel: Baseball’s Greatest Character (Doubleday; 2017), a biography of Hall of Fame player and manager Casey Stengel, nicknamed "The Old Perfessor".

Appel's biographies of King Kelly and Casey Stengel earned him the Casey Award for Best Baseball Book of the Year in 1996 and 2017, respectively.

Appel served as Editor-at-Large for the National Baseball Hall of Fame and Museum's magazine, Memories & Dreams, and helped write the text on the plaques of Hall of Fame inductees. He has contributed to publications including Sports Collectors Digest, Yankees Magazine, and Encyclopedia Americana.

== Boards of directors and honors ==
Appel served as a member of the Board of Directors for the Yogi Berra Museum and Learning Center, was a member of the Board of Trustees of the New York Sports Museum and Hall of Fame and New York Transit Museum, and was a member of the Advisory Council to the Israel Baseball League.

In 2008, Appel was inducted into the National Jewish Sports Hall of Fame. In 2015, the Larchmont Historical Society inducted former Larchmonter Appel into Larchmont Luminaries.

== Personal life ==
Appel married Lourdes Appel in June 2009, with the service being performed by Larchmont, New York, Mayor Liz Feld with Rabbi Jeff Sirkman participating. He has two children from a prior marriage, Brian and Deborah. He is Jewish.

Appel lived in Larchmont for 20 years, and also lived in Spring Valley, in Riverdale, and in Manhattan.

== Bibliography ==
- Thurman Munson, with Thurman Munson, 1978, ISBN 978-0698109179
- Baseball's Best, The Hall of Fame Gallery, with Burt Goldblatt, 1980, ISBN 978-0070021488
- Batting Secrets of the Major Leaguers, 1981, ISBN 978-0671413156
- Tom Seaver's All Time Baseball Greats, with Tom Seaver, 1984, ISBN 978-0671495244
- The First Book of Baseball, 1988, ISBN 978-0517567265
- My Nine Innings, editor, with Lee MacPhail, 1989, ISBN 978-0887363870
- Working the Plate: The Eric Gregg Story, collaborator, 1990, ISBN 978-0688090890
- When You're from Brooklyn, Everything Else Is Tokyo, with Larry King, 1992, ISBN 978-0316493567
- Joe DiMaggio, 1990, ISBN 978-1438142005
- Yogi Berra, 1992, ISBN 978-0791011690
- Great Moments in Baseball, with Tom Seaver, 1995, ISBN 978-0806516110
- Hardball: The Education of a Baseball Commissioner, with Bowie Kuhn, 1997, ISBN 978-0803277847
- Yesterday's Heroes: Revisiting the Old-Time Baseball Stars, 1998, ISBN 978-0688075163
- Slide, Kelly, Slide: The Wild Life and Times of Mike King Kelly, 1999, ISBN 978-1461671206
- Baseball: 100 Classic Moments in the History of the Game, with J. E. Wallace, N. A. Hamilton, N. Ryan, 2000, ISBN 978-0789451217
- Now Pitching for the Yankees, 2001, ISBN 978-1626811218
- Munson: The Life and Death of a Yankee Captain, 2009, ISBN 978-0385522311
- 162-0: Imagine a Season in Which the Yankees Never Lose, 2010, ISBN 978-1617490729
- Pinstripe Empire: The New York Yankees from Before the Babe to After the Boss, 2012, ISBN 978-1620406816
- Pinstripe Pride: The Inside Story of the New York Yankees, 2016, ISBN 978-1481416030
- Casey Stengel: Baseball's Greatest Character, 2017, ISBN 978-0385540476
- Pinstripes by the Tale: Half a Century in and Around Yankees Baseball, 2023, ISBN 978-1637272787
