= Ed Linn =

American sportswriter (1922–2000)

- Born: November 14, 1922; Boston, Massachusetts, U.S.
- Died: February 7, 2000 (aged 77); San Diego, California, U.S.
- Education: Boston University (B.A.)
- Occupations: Author, Biographer, Journalist, Sportswriter
- Spouse: Ruth Linn
- Children: 2
- Writing career
- Notable works: Veeck As in Wreck (1962); The Hustler's Handbook (1965); Thirty Tons A Day (1972)

Edward A. "Ed" Linn (November 14, 1922 - February 7, 2000) was an American sportswriter, author, and biographer who wrote extensively on baseball. During his career, he wrote or co-wrote 17 books, ranging from novels to non-fiction.

He is best known for being the co-author of baseball owner Bill Veeck's three autobiographies: Veeck As in Wreck, The Hustler's Handbook, and Thirty Tons A Day.

== Early life and career ==
Linn was born in Boston, Massachusetts, and graduated from Boston University in 1950. He went on to become a sportswriter for the Saturday Evening Post and for Life and Look magazines.

He co-authored three books with Bill Veeck, at various times the owner of the Cleveland Indians, St. Louis Browns, and the Chicago White Sox of Major League Baseball. Linn also co-authored the autobiographies of baseball player Sandy Koufax, basketball player Bob Cousy, and baseball manager Leo Durocher.

Additionally, Linn also covered topics beyond sports. For the Saturday Evening Post, he covered the trial of Jack Ruby, the killer of Lee Harvey Oswald who assassinated President John F. Kennedy, and co-wrote the memoirs of bank robber Willie Sutton called Where the Money Was. He also authored two novels called Masque of Honor and The Adversaries as well as several other non-fiction books, mostly on baseball.

Linn's book on Ted Williams, titled Hitter: The Life and Turmoils of Ted Williams, was a finalist for the Casey Award in 1993.

== Death ==
Linn died of cancer on February 7, 2000, in San Diego, California, aged 77. He was survived by his wife, Ruth and their two children.

== Bibliography ==
=== Novels ===
- Masque of Honor (1969)
- The Adversaries (1973)

=== Sports biographies ===
==== With Bill Veeck ====
- Veeck As in Wreck: The Autobiography of Bill Veeck (1962)
- The Hustler's Handbook (1965)
- Thirty Tons a Day (1972)

==== Others ====
- Ted Williams: The Eternal Kid (1961)
- The Last Loud Roar (with Bob Cousy) (1964)
- Koufax (with Sandy Koufax) (1966)
- Nice Guys Finish Last (with Leo Durocher) (1975)
- Hitter: The Life and Turmoils of Ted Williams (1993)

=== Non-sports biographies ===
- Out of the Fire (with Ernst Papanek) (1975)
- Where the Money Was: The Memoirs of a Bank Robber (with Willie Sutton) (1976)
- A Great Connection (with John H. Krehbiel Sr.) (1988)

=== Non-fiction ===
- Big Julie: The Pied Piper of Las Vegas (1974)
- Inside the Yankees: The Championship Season (1978)
- Steinbrenner's Yankees: An Inside Account (1982)
- The Great Rivalry: The Yankees and the Red Sox, 1909-1990 (1991)
