= Jason Turbow =

American author and journalist

- Occupations: Author, Journalist
- Writing career
- Genres: Non-fiction, Sports
- Notable works: The Baseball Codes, Dynastic, Bombastic, Fantastic

Jason Turbow is an American author and journalist best known for his baseball writing. He is the author of The Baseball Codes: Beanballs, Sign Stealing, and Bench-Clearing Brawls: The Unwritten Rules of America's Pastime (2010), Dynastic, Bombastic, Fantastic: Reggie, Rollie, Catfish, and Charlie Finley's Swingin' A's (2017), They Bled Blue: Fernandomania, Strike-Season Mayhem, and the Weirdest Championship Baseball Had Ever Seen: The 1981 Los Angeles Dodgers (2019), and is the co-author of Kenny Loggins' memoir, Still Alright: A Memoir (2022).

== Career ==
Jason Turbow attended the University of California, Santa Cruz. He began his professional career as the sports editor at the Crescent City Triplicate, a newspaper based in a small logging town on the north coast of California. After gaining experience in the field, Turbow moved on to join the San Francisco Chronicle.

At the San Francisco Chronicle, Turbow was responsible for editing Giants Today, a full-page supplement published in tandem with every Giants home game. Turbow eventually wrote for various publications like The New York Times, The Wall Street Journal, and Sports Illustrated. His passion for baseball led him to focus on sports journalism, particularly about the intricacies of America's pastime.

In 2010, Turbow published his first book, The Baseball Codes, which explored the unwritten rules of baseball, including beanballs, sign stealing, and bench-clearing brawls. The book received positive reviews and established Turbow as a respected voice in baseball literature.

In 2017, Turbow released Dynastic, Bombastic, Fantastic, a book that chronicled the rise and fall of the Oakland Athletics under the ownership of Charles O. Finley during the 1970s. The book detailed the team's colorful personalities and their three consecutive World Series championships from 1972 to 1974.
