= David Lamb (journalist) =

American journalist

David Sherman Lamb (March 5, 1940 – June 5, 2016) was a freelance writer who traveled the world for twenty-five years as a Los Angeles Times correspondent. He left the paper in 2004 after 34 years and then freelanced.

== Biography ==
David Lamb was born in Boston, Massachusetts. For most of his high school education, he attended Phillips Exeter Academy, where he ran a gambling ring, and was nicknamed "The Joker." At Exeter, Lamb was friends with Benno Schmidt, who later became president of Yale University; Lamb was expelled after the school's administration searched his dorm room over winter break, and even hired a locksmith to open up his locked box of IOUs.

He later graduated from the University of Maine's School of Journalism in 1962, where he was a member of Beta Theta Pi. He began his career with The Okinawa Morning Star, then moved on to the Las Vegas Review-Journal, and the Oakland Tribune. He then joined United Press International in San Francisco and Denver; from 1968 to 1970, he worked as a battlefront correspondent in Saigon. He joined the Los Angeles Times in 1970 and was based in Los Angeles, New York, and Washington, D.C., as well as being bureau chief in Sydney, Nairobi, Cairo and Hanoi. He covered the fall of Saigon in April 1975 on a temporary assignment for The Los Angeles Times.

He was a Nieman Fellow, an Alicia Patterson Journalism Fellow (1985), a Pew Fellow and a writer-in-residence at the University of Southern California's School of Journalism. He is believed to be the only U.S. newspaper correspondent from the Vietnam War to later live in peacetime Hanoi, Vietnam.

He married his partner, Sandy Northrop, in Nairobi in 1977.

== Books ==
- The Africans
- The Arabs: Journeys Beyond the Mirage
- Stolen Season: A Journey Through America and Baseball's Minor Leagues
- A Sense of Place: Listening to Americans
- Over The Hills: A Midlife Escape Across America By Bicycle
- Vietnam, Now: A Reporter Returns
