= Greg Rhodes =

American businessman

Greg Rhodes is the former Executive Director of the Cincinnati Reds Hall of Fame and Museum and now serves as the Cincinnati Reds team historian. He was named to his current position in January 2007.

Rhodes has authored or co-authored six books on the Cincinnati Reds. Rhodes has twice won one of the Society for American Baseball Research's, top awards: The Sporting News-SABR Baseball Research Award. Rhodes and Mark Stang won in 1999 with Reds in Black and White; Rhodes and John Snyder won in 2001 with Redleg Journal. Both books were published by Road West.

A native of Richmond, Indiana, Rhodes worked for the Cincinnati Historical Society from 1987 to 1992, helped plan the creation of the new history museum at the Museum Center, served as president of the board of Historic Southwest Ohio, and chaired the local chapter of the Society for American Baseball Research (SABR). As of 2006 he is president of the 1869 Cincinnati Red Stockings Vintage Base Ball Club.
