= Peter Golenbock =

American sportswriter

- Born: July 19, 1946 (age 80); New York, New York, U.S.
- Occupations: Author, lawyer
- Writing career
- Genre: Non-fiction
- Subjects: Baseball, American sports, politics

Peter Golenbock (born July 19, 1946) is an American author. He is noted for his many books about baseball and other sports. Many of his books have been bestsellers.

== Career ==
Golenbock initially worked as a lawyer for Prentice Hall, a publishing house. He began his writing career after convincing an editor to let him write a book about the Yankees. The book, Dynasty: The New York Yankees, 1949-1964, was chosen by Joe Torre as one of the best books on baseball, in a 1997 New York Times article.

The Bronx Zoo, which Golenbock coauthored with Yankees pitcher Sparky Lyle, was a New York Times bestseller and, in 2003, was chosen as one of Sports Illustrated's "Top 100 Sports Books of All Time".

Personal Fouls: The Broken Promises and Shattered Dreams of Big Money Basketball at Jim Valvano's North Carolina State was controversial when it was published. The book alleged widespread corruption behind the program's success. Golenbock relied on only 12 sources, two of whom were paid, most of the information was reported anonymously, and the book contained many small errors. The original publisher, Simon & Schuster, had been slated to publish it as part of its "Pocketbooks" brand, but then dropped it, saying that it did not meet their standards, at which point it was picked up by Carroll & Graf Publishers Inc., who published it instead. Along the way, the North Carolina attorney general threatened a lawsuit.

== Critical reception ==
Publishers Weekly called Wild, High and Tight: The Life and Death of Billy Martin, about the life of baseball manager Billy Martin, "an extremely thorough and comprehensive biography." The review mentions Golenbock's assertion that Martin was the actual driver the night he died in a drunken car crash. Kirkus Reviews wrote that Cowboys Have Always Been My Heroes: The Definitive Oral History of America's Team "should not be missed," calling it a "brilliantly conceived and executed chronicle." The Washington Post wrote that American Nero: The History of the Destruction of the Rule of Law, and Why Trump Is the Worst Offender, coauthored with Richard Painter, "serves to remind us, in icy, granular detail, of what has happened to constitutional democracy in three short years, and all that we have absorbed, integrated and somehow moved beyond."

Golenbock has been criticized for carelessness and poor copyediting.

== Partial bibliography ==
- Dynasty: The New York Yankees, 1949-1964 (1975)
- The Bronx Zoo (1979), with Sparky Lyle
- Number 1 (1980), with Billy Martin
- Balls (1984), with Graig Nettles
- Bums: An Oral History of the Brooklyn Dodgers (1984)
- Personal Fouls: The Broken Promises and Shattered Dreams of Big Money Basketball at Jim Valvano's North Carolina State (1989)
- American Zoom: Stock Car Racing-From the Dirt Tracks to Daytona (1993)
- Cowboys Have Always Been My Heroes: The Definitive Oral History of America's Team (1997)
- The Spirit of St. Louis: A History of the St. Louis Cardinals and Browns (2000)
- Amazin': The Miraculous History of New York's Most Beloved Baseball Team (2002)
- Miracle: Bobby Allison and the Saga of the Alabama Gang (2006)
- Rage: The Legend of "Baseball Bill" Denehy (2014), with Bill Denehy
- American Nero: The History of the Destruction of the Rule of Law, and Why Trump Is the Worst Offender (2020), with Richard Painter
