= Steinbrenner (surname) =

Steinbrenner is a surname. Notable people with the name include:

- Gene Steinbrenner (1892–1972), American baseball player
- George Steinbrenner (1930–2010), American businessman and owner of New York Yankees baseball team
- Hal Steinbrenner (born 1969), American businessman and part-owner of the New York Yankees baseball team
- Hank Steinbrenner (1957–2020), American businessman and part-owner of the New York Yankees baseball team
- Hans Steinbrenner (sculptor) (1928-2008), German painter and sculptor
- Hans Steinbrenner (SS member) (1905-1964), German concentration camp overseer
- Joan Steinbrenner (1935–2018), American vice-chair of the New York Yankees baseball team
- Sophia Steinbrenner (died 1933), American businesswoman

== See also ==
- Steinbrenner family
