= Steinbrenner Racing =

American racing team

- Owner(s): George Michael Steinbrenner IV, Julia Steinbrenner
- Principal(s): George Michael Steinbrenner IV, Julia Steinbrenner
- Base: 1 Steinbrenner Drive, Tampa, FL 33614
- Series: IndyCar Series
- Race drivers: Devlin DeFrancesco
- Manufacturer: Honda
- Opened: 2016

Career
- Indy 500 victories: 0
- Race victories: Indycar: 3 Indy NXT: 6 USF Pro 2000: 2
- Pole positions: Indycar: 4 Indy NXT: 9 USF Pro 2000: 3

Steinbrenner Racing is an American automotive racing team that competes in the IndyCar Series. The team is owned by George Michael Steinbrenner IV and Julia Steinbrenner. George and Julia are the children of the late co-owner and co-chairman of the New York Yankees, Hank Steinbrenner and grandchildren of George Steinbrenner III. The team currently fields the No. 29 Dallara Honda for Devlin DeFrancesco in conjunction with Andretti Autosport. George Steinbrenner is the youngest winning owner in INDYCAR history, which he achieved in 2019 when Colton Herta won the team's second race in the series at the Circuit of the Americas.

== History ==
=== Indy Lights and the road to Indy ===
Steinbrenner Racing was formed by George Steinbrenner in December 2016 in partnership with Andretti Autosport to run his long time friend Colton Herta in the 2017 Indy Lights season. In 2017 the team ran the No. 98 sponsored by Deltro Energy. The team got off to a winning start capturing the pole position in the first race of the season at St. Petersburg and the win in race two of their debut weekend. This win also made Herta the youngest winner in Indy Lights history. Herta followed up his opening weekend success with another win during the Honda Grand Prix of Alabama. The team would end the year third in the standings with two wins and 7 podiums while leading the series with 6 poles and Herta winning Rookie of the Year honors.

The No. 98 team returned to Indy Lights with Herta and their partnership with Andretti Autosport as well as their sponsorship from Deltro Energy in 2018. The team built on their 2017 success with Herta becoming the first driver to sweep the Month of May in Indy Lights by winning both races on the road course and capping the month by winning the Freedom 100. The team scored podiums in all but 4 races on their way to a second place finish in the standings.

Steinbrenner Racing returned to the Road to Indy in 2020 when they co-entered Devlin DeFrancesco in the IndyPro 2000 series with Andretti Autosport. The team enjoyed a successful season during which DeFrancesco won 2 races and finished with 3 poles and 6 podiums on the way to a second place finish in the standings. In 2021 Steinbrenner Racing returned to Indy Lights competition with Devlin DeFrancesco piloting the No. 17 car. DeFrancesco scored two podiums at Barber Motorsports Park to open the season and finished sixth in the points standings in his rookie season.

=== INDYCAR ===
On September 17, 2018 prior to the Yankees – Red Sox game at Yankee Stadium, Steinbrenner announced he would be bringing Herta and the technical partnership with Andretti to a new partnership with Harding Racing to run the No. 88 Dallara Honda in the 2019 Indycar season. Steinbrenner became the youngest team owner in Indycar history at 22 years old. On March 24, 2019 Herta became the youngest winning driver in Indycar history with a win at the Circuit of the Americas at 18 years old and Steinbrenner became the youngest winning owner at 22 years old. The team would experience success throughout the year finishing the season with 3 poles and 2 wins including a win from pole at the season ending Grand Prix of Monterey.

Following an incredibly successful inaugural Indycar season Steinbrenner Racing once again partnered with Andretti Autosport in 2020 to field Herta in the No. 88 with support from Capstone Green Energy. On April 14, 2020, prior to the start of the Indycar season, team co-founder Hank Steinbrenner died. The family and team partner Capstone Green Energy would run a special Yankees pinstripes paint scheme honoring Hank in both that week's iRacing event as well as the season opener at Texas Motor Speedway that June. In 2020 Colton Herta achieved his highest points finish to date finishing 3rd in the series standings while winning race two of the Honda Indy 200 at Mid Ohio.

In 2021 Steinbrenner Racing shifted from the No. 88 to the No. 29 to run James Hinchcliffe who finished on the podium at the inaugural Music City Grand Prix held on the streets of Nashville, Tennessee.

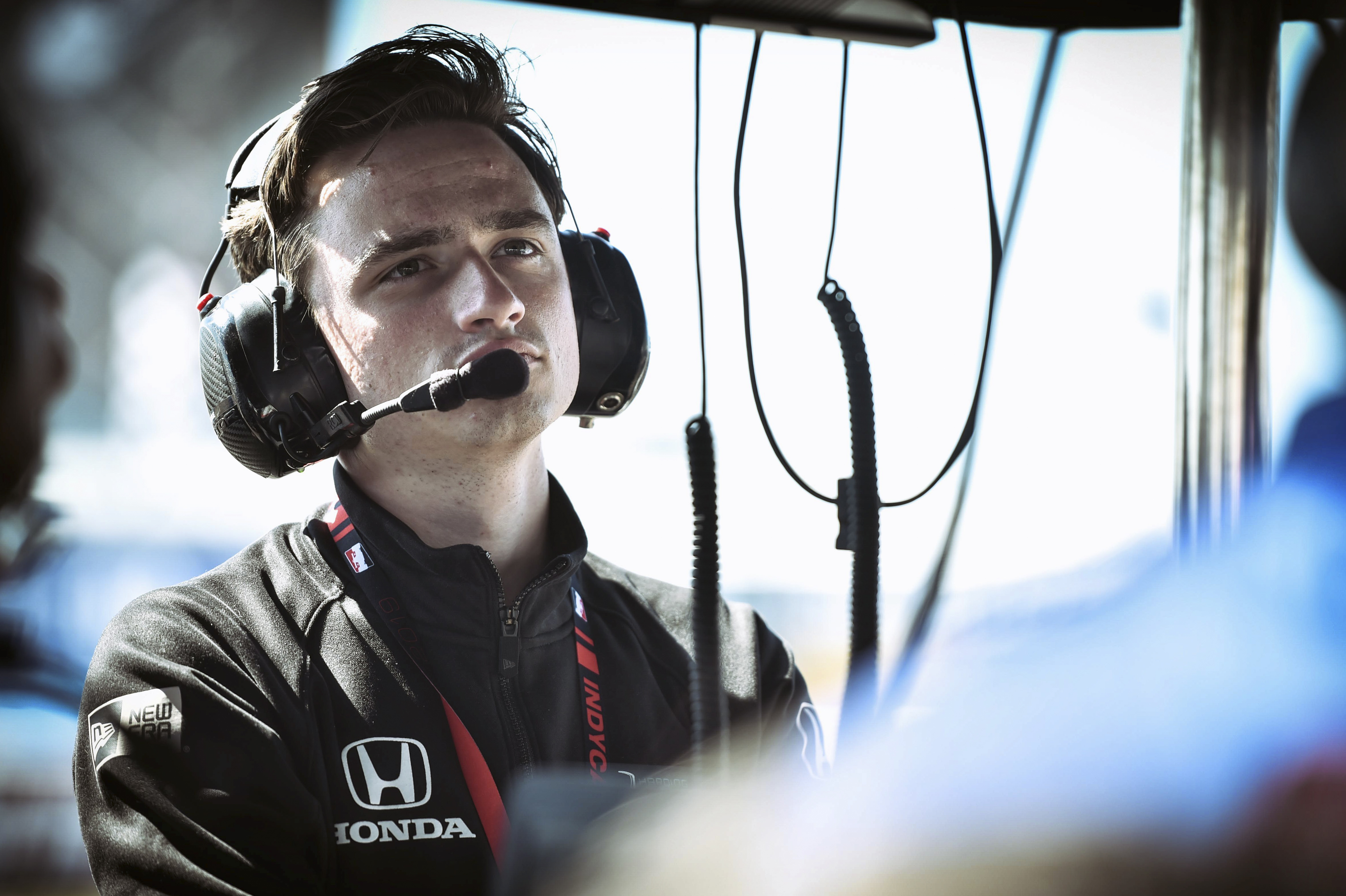
Team owner George Steinbrenner IV is Indycar's youngest winning owner.

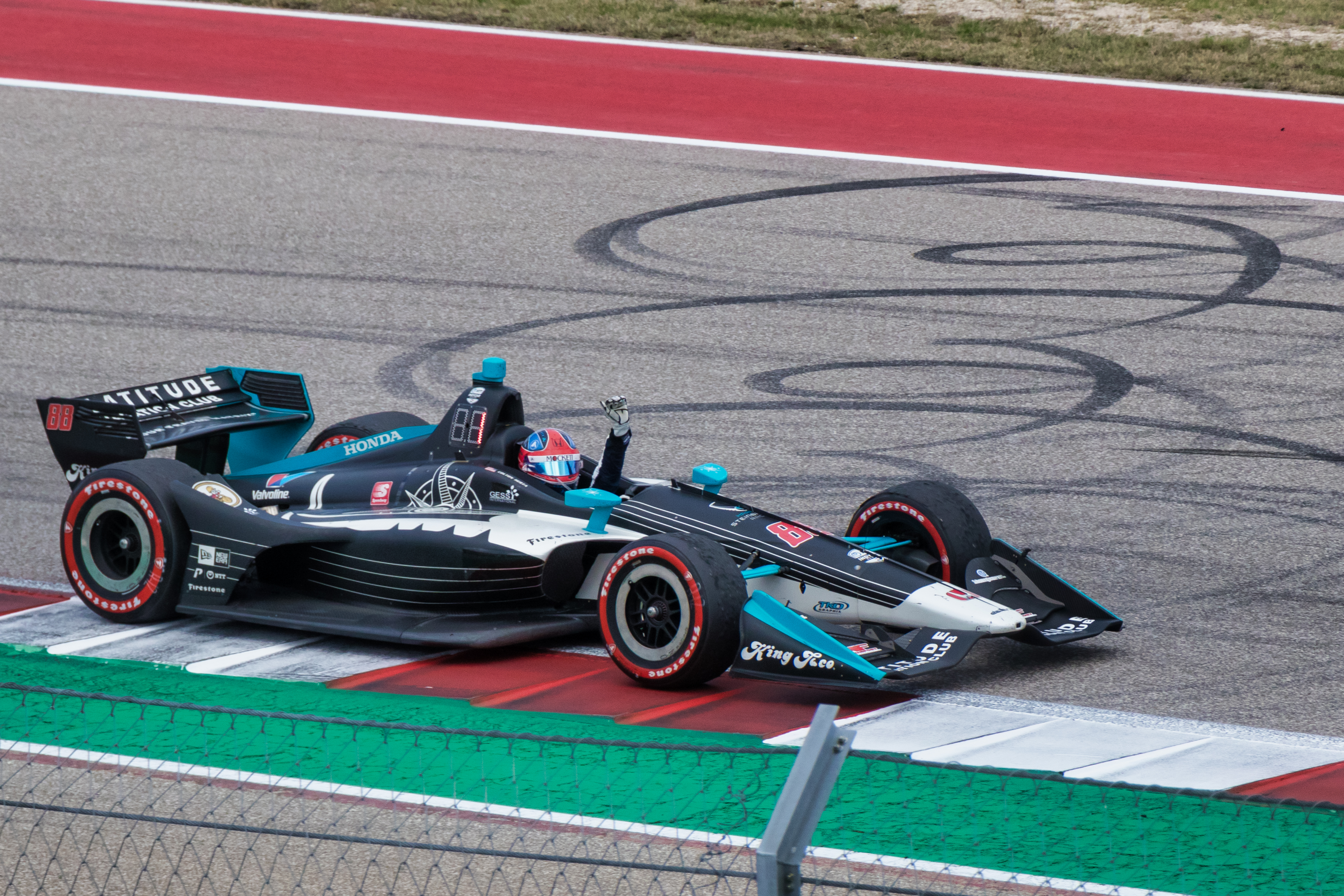
Colton Herta takes Steinbrenner Racing's first Indycar victory at COTA

On November 4th, 2021 Steinbrenner Racing announced that in 2022 Devlin DeFrancesco would drive the No. 29 Honda entered with Andretti Autosport primarily supported by Capstone Green Energy, Powertap Hydrogen, and Atmofizer. Additionally, the team announced on February 23, 2022 that George's sister Julia would be taking an active co-ownership role with the team effective immediately. DeFrancesco finished 23rd in his rookie Indycar season. He returned to the No. 29 Honda for the 2023 season primarily supported by Capstone, EVTEC Automotive, Sodexo, and Sapphire Gas Solutions. In 2024, Andretti reduced their lineup from four cars to three, eliminating the number 29 car.

== Drivers ==
- Colton Herta (2017–2018 Indy Lights; 2019–2020 Indycar)
- James Hinchcliffe (2021)
- Devlin DeFrancesco (2020 Indy Pro 2000; 2021 Indy Lights; 2022–2023 Indycar)

== George 4 Foundation ==
In January 2020 George and Julia Steinbrenner founded the George4 Foundation to support the education and welfare of children and families in Indianapolis as well as the communities visited by Indycar. Partners of the race team support numerous charitable causes with the foundation and will hold events on race weekends during the season.
