= Steinbrenner =

Steinbrenner may refer to:

- Steinbrenner (surname)
- George M. Steinbrenner Field, baseball stadium in Tampa, Florida, U.S.
- Steinbrenner High School, Lutz, Florida, U.S.
