= Yankee Global Enterprises =

American company which owns the New York Yankees baseball team

Yankee Global Enterprises, LLC
- Formerly: YankeeNets, LLC (1999–2004)
- Type: Private
- Industry: Sports; Hospitality
- Founded: October 1999; 27 years ago
- Founder: George Steinbrenner
- Headquarters: New York City, United States
- Area served: New York City
- Key people: Hal Steinbrenner; Lester Crown; Donald B. Marron Sr. Jerry Speyer
- Products: Professional sports teams Sports venues Cable channels
- Brands: Yankee
- Owner: The Steinbrenner Family
- Divisions: New York Yankees Partnership
- Subsidiaries: Yankees Entertainment & Sports Network, LLC (46%); Legends Hospitality (33%); New York City Football Club, LLC (10%); Associazione Calcio Milan S.p.A. (10%); George M. Steinbrenner Field; Yankee Stadium (operator)

Yankee Global Enterprises, LLC, formerly YankeeNets, LLC, is an American limited liability company (LLC) which owns the New York Yankees baseball team, along with a plurality stake in YES Network and 10% stakes in New York City FC and AC Milan soccer clubs. It was formed in 1999 and is controlled by the family of George Steinbrenner. Other investors, including Lester Crown, Jerry Speyer, and Marvin Goldklang own minority stakes.

The company was originally created as YankeeNets, through a merger between the Yankees and the New Jersey Nets (now known as the Brooklyn Nets).

== History ==
In 1998, the New York Yankees had their most successful season in modern history, winning a combined total of 125 regular season and playoff games, culminating in a World Series championship. The team was in discussions to be sold to Cablevision, who at the time owned the broadcast rights to every Major League Baseball, National Basketball Association (NBA), and National Hockey League (NHL) team in the New York metropolitan area. The proposed deal fell through because the two sides could not come to an agreement that would include George Steinbrenner continuing to run the team and Cablevision's other pro teams, New York Knicks of the NBA and New York Rangers of the NHL, for the new owners.

After the proposed sale fell through, the Yankees and New Jersey Nets of the NBA agreed to merge business operations, creating a combined holding company. This was done to increase the negotiating power of both teams for future television contracts and stadium and arena construction deals. The Yankees' local broadcasting rights with Cablevision's MSG Network were expiring at the end of 2000 season and the Nets' deal with Fox Sports New York would end with the 2001–2002 season. Steinbrenner began considering his own regional sports cable channel. Primary Nets owner Lewis Katz was mainly interested in a new arena. The pre-merger owners would continue to control their teams, with a minority interest in the other team. This arrangement was approved by both Major League Baseball and the NBA.

Harvey Schiller was hired as chairman and chief executive officer of the company in October 1999. The New Jersey Devils of the NHL was offered for sale to YankeeNets at the end of 1999. With the company and Nets team unable to take on more debt, Katz and Ray Chambers formed Puck Holdings as an affiliate of the company to acquire the Devils for $175 million. Bonds were issued in March 2000 to pay for Steinbrenner's share of the Yankees.

With the Yankees' television contract with Cablevision expiring in 2001 and the Nets' contract expiring after the 2001–2002 season, the teams negotiated together with potential cable partners for the next contract. They spoke to Cablevision about remaining on their networks. After an IMG proposed partnership channel, an MSG/Cablevision lawsuit and a termination payment by September 2001, YankeeNets had cleared the way to start its Yankees Entertainment and Sports Network with 40% outside ownership.

Since the founding, the two ownership groups had clashed over team management, players' contract, purchasing the Devils and YES Network. Additionally, Steinbrenner would not subsidize the loss from the Devils. On December 8, 2003, the two sides agreed to split with the Nets owners selling the Nets and giving up their part of the Yankees. The Nets sale did not include the team's stake in the YES Network, which remained with the pre-merger owners. After a reverse stock swap in 2004, the Nets were sold to Brooklyn Basketball LLC, which was controlled by Bruce Ratner, and 38% of Puck Holdings was sold to an entity controlled by Lewis Katz and Ray Chambers.

=== Yankee Global Enterprises ===
In 2004, with the exodus of the Nets and Devils complete, the company changed its name to Yankee Global Enterprises LLC, keeping the Yankees and the YES Network as separate entities owned by the same company. Steinbrenner named Steve Swindal, his son-in-law, to be chairman of Yankee Global Enterprises and his successor as boss of the Yankees in June 2005. When Swindal and Jennifer Steinbrenner divorced in 2007, the Yankees bought Swindal out of his financial stake in the team, with Hal Steinbrenner succeeding Swindal as chairman of Yankee Global Enterprises.

In April 2008, Legends Hospitality Management won the Yankee Stadium concessions away from Centerplate. With no known history, Legends was revealed on October 20, 2008, to be a new stadium hospitality company evenly owned by the Yankees and Dallas Cowboys and a third owned by some combination of Goldman Sachs and CIC Partners.

In November 2012, News Corporation agreed to terms on acquiring a 49% stake in YES. As a consequence, each of the network's previous owners had their ownership stakes reduced with Yankee Global's new holdings to be 25% share. As a result of the sale to Fox, the Yankees agreed to keep their games on the network through 2041, which would be the network's 40th year of existence. In March 2014, Fox Sports acquired 32% of the YES Network leaving Yankee Global with only a 20% stake. In the agreement, Yankee Global has the right to purchase YES Network if Fox puts it up for sale.

With Disney acquiring most of 21st Century Fox, Yankee Global began considering purchasing back the share of YES Network it did not own. On June 27, 2018, the United States Department of Justice gave antitrust approval to Disney under the condition of selling Fox's 22 regional sports channels, to which the company has agreed. Yankee Global Enterprises confirmed it would repurchase a majority stake in YES Network on March 8, 2019.

On August 30, 2022, it was announced that Yankee Global Enterprises acquired a 10% stake in Italian soccer club AC Milan along with RedBird Capital Partners.

== See also ==
- Steinbrenner family
