= Steve Swindel =

Steve Swindel may refer to:

- Steve Swindells (born 1952), English singer-songwriter
- Steve Swindal, American businessman
- Steve Swindall (born 1982), Scottish former rugby union footballer
