= New York Yankees appearance policy =

Personal grooming policy instituted by the New York Yankees

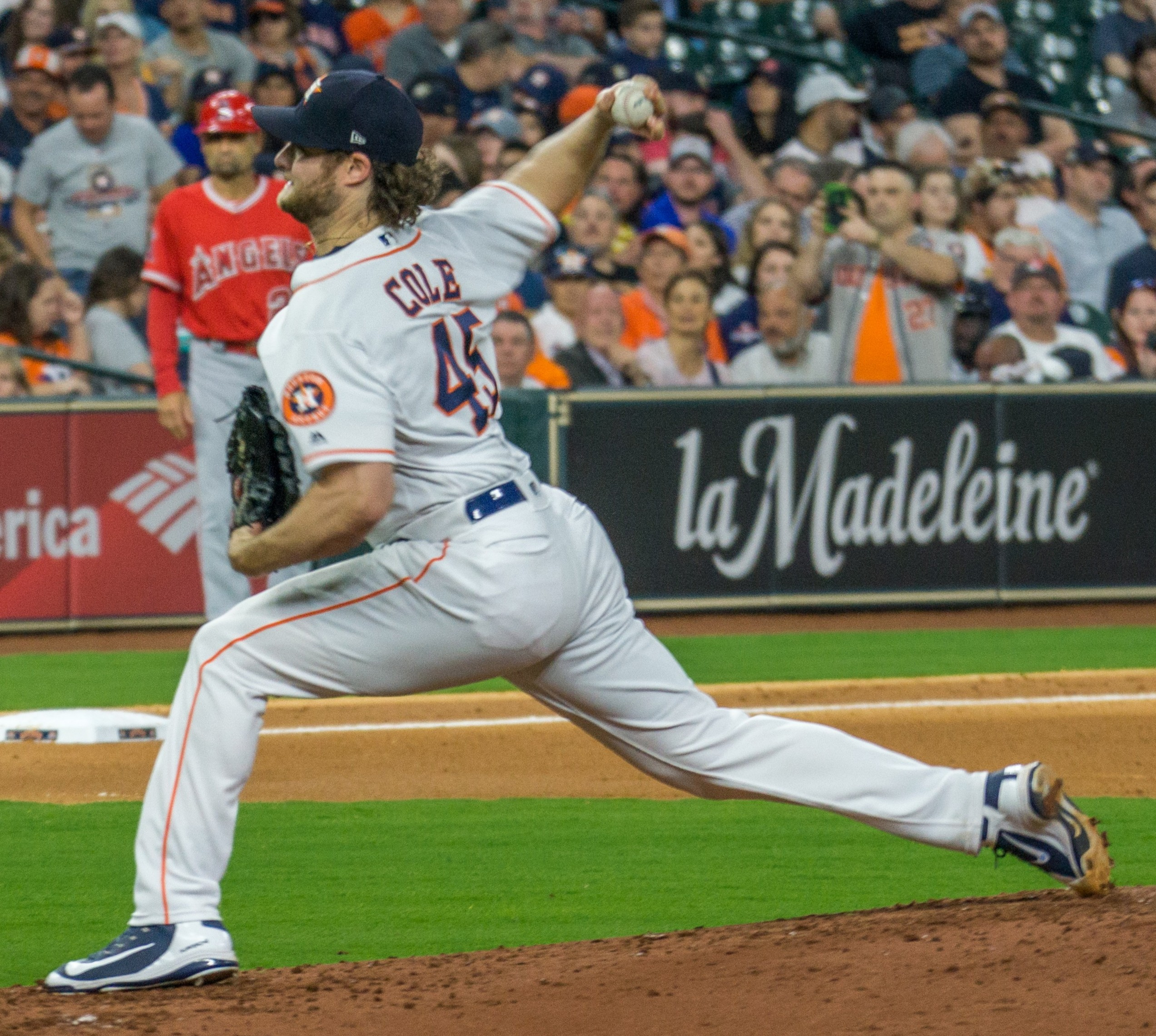
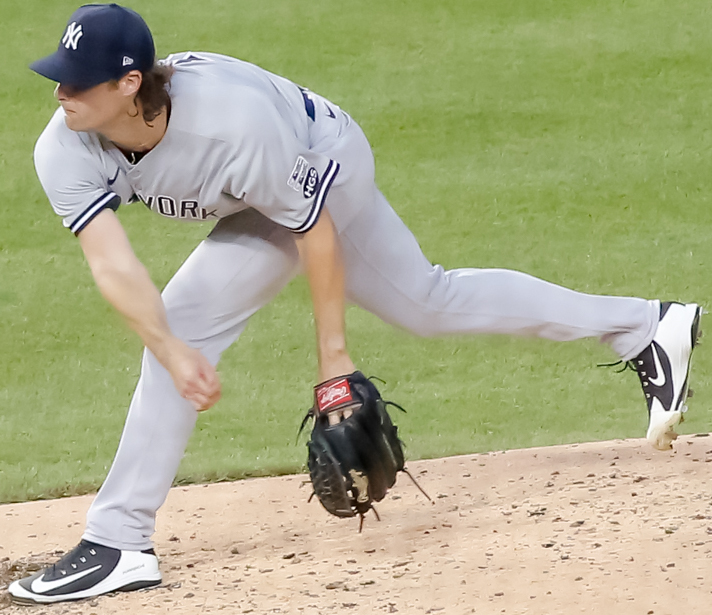
Gerrit Cole in 2018 and 2020, before and after signing with the New York Yankees.

Beginning in 1976, the New York Yankees of Major League Baseball (MLB) maintained a strict appearance policy, specifying that players' hair must not touch their collars and that they may have mustaches but no other facial hair. The policy came from then-franchise owner George Steinbrenner, who believed that regulating his players' appearance would instill a sense of discipline. Steinbrenner began noting which players he believed needed haircuts when he took over the Yankees in 1973, but the policy was not codified until three years later. Steinbrenner's policy remained in place after his death, and led to a number of dramatic appearance changes for players who come to the Yankees from other teams, such as Oscar Gamble, as well as pushback from players who prefer long hair and beards. In 1991, Don Mattingly was taken out of the Yankees' lineup for a day when he refused to cut his hair.

Most teams did not formally adopt any grooming or personal appearance policies until the 1970s, as earlier social customs meant that players were generally clean-shaven. This changed in 1972, when members of the Oakland Athletics, led by Reggie Jackson, formed The Mustache Gang. After that point, individual managers began to tighten or relax their teams' grooming standards as they saw fit. Steinbrenner's policy was inspired by that of the Cincinnati Reds, who forbade their players from growing facial hair between 1967 and 1999, when Greg Vaughn petitioned Marge Schott to rescind the rule. Former Yankees Mattingly and Joe Girardi have twice attempted to institute a similar policy on the Florida/Miami Marlins, but restrictions on that team have since loosened.

The Yankees' policy was criticized by sportswriters as outdated, and by marketing officials for limiting the self-expression of players, thus also limiting their personal brands. Players such as Andrew McCutchen and Clint Frazier critiqued the policy after leaving the Yankees, while both Brian Wilson and David Price voiced their refusal to join the team as long as the appearance policy remained in place. The policy was amended in 2025 to allow "well-groomed beards", by order of Hal Steinbrenner.

== Origin ==
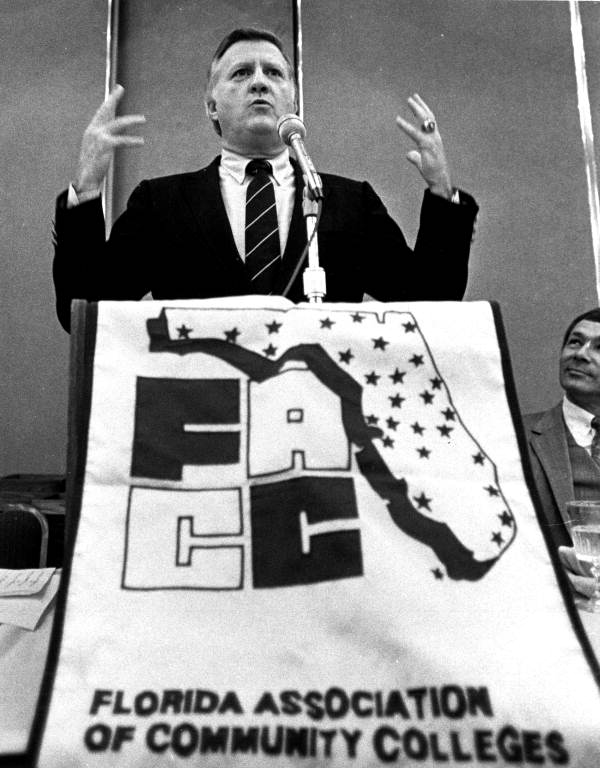
George Steinbrenner instituted the Yankees' personal appearance policy in 1973.

While facial hair was common in the early era of Major League Baseball, it had fallen out of fashion by the early 20th century, and instances of players growing beards and mustaches during the baseball season became rare. Before 1970, the last player known to have sported a mustache during the regular MLB season was Frenchy Bordagaray in 1936, whose manager, Casey Stengel of the Brooklyn Dodgers, subsequently ordered him to shave. There were no codified restrictions on mustaches and other facial hair in MLB during this time period; rather, the social customs of the time preferred a clean-shaven appearance, and players willingly conformed. This streak of clean-shaven players came to an end when Dick Allen of the Philadelphia Phillies and Felipe Alou of the Oakland Athletics grew mustaches for the 1970 MLB season.

In 1972, Oakland Athletics player Reggie Jackson appeared at spring training sporting a full beard. Rather than asking him to shave outright, Athletics owner Charlie Finley, knowing that Jackson valued his individuality, encouraged four of his players to grow their own facial hair in the hopes that Jackson would voluntarily shave. As more of his players grew them, Finley began to like the mustaches, and the 1972 Athletics were soon nicknamed "The Mustache Gang". The 1972 World Series, in which the Athletics faced the clean-cut Cincinnati Reds, was deemed a match between "the Hairs and the Squares".

George Steinbrenner became the owner of the New York Yankees the year after the Mustache Gang debuted. Steinbrenner, who had previously spent time in the United States Air Force and adhered to their strict grooming standards, became incensed when, during the Yankees' Opening Day game against the Cleveland Indians, his players removed their baseball caps for "The Star-Spangled Banner" and subsequently displayed their shaggy hair. After the game, Steinbrenner, who did not yet know the names of the players whose hair he considered unacceptable, wrote down their jersey numbers for manager Ralph Houk to reprimand after the game: No. 1, Bobby Murcer; No. 15, Thurman Munson; No. 17, Gene Michael; and No. 28, Sparky Lyle. Although Houk did not tell the players that the order came from Steinbrenner, Jerry Moses later recalled that he "read it in a manner that let us know it didn't come from him and that he didn't agree with it". The players, meanwhile, were primarily amused that Steinbrenner did not know their names.

The terms of the Yankees' appearance policy were codified in 1976, when Steinbrenner and manager Billy Martin introduced the "Neatness Counts" policy, which specified: "No beards. No beads. No mutton chops. No long hair. No long stirrups." The policy has since been amended to read: "All players, coaches, and male executives are forbidden to display any facial hair other than mustaches (except for religious reasons), and scalp hair may not be grown below the collar. Long sideburns and 'mutton chops' are not specifically banned." Steinbrenner argued in 1978 that the policy was not specifically about a distaste for long hair and more about "trying to instill a certain sense of order and discipline" that he believed was important for athletes to maintain.

== Impact ==
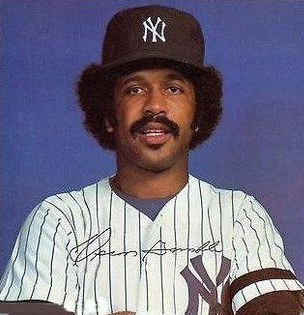
Oscar Gamble was required to shave his signature Afro to play in Yankees games, but was allowed to keep it in his trading cards.

The policy remained in effect even after Steinbrenner's death at the request of his daughter Jennifer, a partner in the Yankees franchise. The strict grooming requirements of the baseball club have led to several instances in which a player known for his long hair or beard on his former team becomes clean-cut upon signing with the Yankees. Notable examples include Randy Johnson, Johnny Damon, Nick Swisher, Jason Giambi, Kevin Youkilis, and Gerrit Cole. One of the most drastic changes caused by this policy was to Oscar Gamble, who was known for his distinctive Afro hairstyle, and even had an endorsement deal with Afro Sheen that would be lost if he were to cut his hair. Steinbrenner, holding firm to his policies, reimbursed Gamble for the lost endorsement package. Although he did not sport the Afro while on the field, Gamble's Yankees trading card still portrayed the hairstyle, as did the image projected on the scoreboard at Yankee Stadium, and fans would often wear wigs styled after his former hairstyle.

The Yankees' appearance policy has also led to clashes between management and players who refuse to conform to Steinbrenner's standards. In April 1977, Dock Ellis was traded to the Oakland Athletics after he wore an earring while on the pitchers' mound. Six years later, when Goose Gossage was reminded that mustaches were the only facial hair allowed, he shaved only the chin of his beard, thus creating the exaggerated mustache that became synonymous with the pitcher. Lou Piniella, meanwhile, once challenged the rule during spring training in Fort Lauderdale, citing that Jesus had long hair. Steinbrenner responded by pointing at a nearby swimming pool and saying: "If you can walk on water, you can wear your hair any way you want." One of the strongest moments of dissent came during the 1991 New York Yankees season, when Don Mattingly was fined and removed from the starting lineup for refusing to cut his hair. The next day, the team agreed to allow Mattingly back into the lineup for their game against the Chicago White Sox, and he told reporters that he would likely cut his hair soon of his own accord. The incident was parodied in the Simpsons episode "Homer at the Bat", which aired February 1992, in which Mattingly (who guest-voices himself) was benched after clashing with Mr. Burns over the length of his sideburns, which only Mr. Burns could see; this eventually results in his expulsion from the team, after which Mattingly mutters "I still like [Burns] better than Steinbrenner". Although the episode aired after Stump Merrill benched Mattingly, the Simpsons showrunners said that the sideburns storyline was recorded beforehand, and that the storyline was based on Al Jean's grandfather, who held his own strict appearance policy.

As the appearance policy only applies during the MLB season, members of the Yankees often grow facial hair during the offseason. The policy also leaves an exception for mustaches, and in 2015, a number of Yankees began growing mustaches out of a superstition that their facial hair growth was tied to their improved game performance. Although the group mustache growth ended that May after the team went on a 1–10 losing streak, individual Yankees have carried on their own mustache traditions, growing them out or shaving them based on their perceived personal performance.

== Criticism and amendments ==
Sportswriters have criticized the Yankees' appearance policy in recent years as an outdated product of Steinbrenner's time, as well as the limitations that it places on what players the Yankees are willing to take in trades and free agency. In 2013, general manager Brian Cashman attempted to acquire relief pitcher Brian Wilson in free agency, but negotiations halted when Wilson refused to shave his signature beard. Pitcher David Price, meanwhile, told reporters that he would not want to sign with the Yankees due to their appearance policy. Bill Baer of NBC Sports also critiqued the Yankees' policy for its difficulties in marketing players, citing Justin Turner and Charlie Blackmon as two players known for their beards. Independent marketing executives have commented on the strong "Yankees brand" generated by the players' homogeneous appearance, but have criticized the negative impact that has on creating individual player brands.

Some former Yankees players also voiced their opposition to the policy after leaving the team. Andrew McCutchen, who was asked to shave when he was traded to the Yankees in 2018, criticized the Yankees' appearance policy for limiting the individualism of players. McCutchen, who had worn long dreadlocks as a member of the Pittsburgh Pirates, said that if he had been traded to the Yankees during that time, it would have been difficult to part with his hair, "because that's who I was. That's made me Andrew McCutchen." (McCutchen would cut his dreadlocks off on his own accord in 2015 for charity while still with the Pirates.) Clint Frazier, whose curly red hair was declared "a distraction", joked on Twitter, "here's to leaving my razor at home" after joining the Chicago Cubs. Despite admitting that some players preferred to keep their facial hair during the MLB season, then-manager Joe Girardi said in 2017 that "I haven't really had anyone come into my office and say, 'We need to change this.'" Yankees management have even claimed the policy keeps the Yankees unique.

On February 21, 2025, the Yankees amended their appearance policy, permitting players and coaches to have "well-groomed beards". Owner Hal Steinbrenner, who inherited the team from his father George, made the decision after several years of internal dialogue, culminating in conversations with players. One of the driving forces behind this change was Devin Williams, whom the Yankees had acquired in an offseason trade with the Milwaukee Brewers. Williams, who had worn a beard his entire professional career, voiced his frustrations to general manager Brian Cashman about the inconsistent application of a policy that allowed mustaches but not beard stubble.

== Outside the Yankees ==
Around the time of Steinbrenner's edict, personal grooming policies among MLB teams greatly varied based on the personal preferences of managers. When Vern Rapp took over the St. Louis Cardinals in 1977, he insisted that players like Al Hrabosky shave their facial hair. The opposite scenario occurred the next year, when George Bamberger was put in charge of the Milwaukee Brewers and subsequently relaxed the appearance restrictions put into place by his predecessor, Alex Grammas. The terms of Steinbrenner's appearance policy, meanwhile, were inspired by that of the Cincinnati Reds, who forbid their players from growing their hair past their collar or sporting any form of facial hair besides short sideburns. Although no member of the Reds had sported facial hair since 1902, general manager Bob Howsam put a formal ban into place in 1967. The following year, Cincinnati mascot Mr. Red appeared sans mustache in accordance with the new policy. Howsam's policy was crafted out of a desire for the Reds to look uniform and professional, and was part of a larger series of guidelines that also required every member of the team to paint their shoes black, and in at least one instance cost them a free agent when Hall of Fame relief pitcher & Ohio native Rollie Fingers opted to retire instead of shaving off his signature handlebar moustache he grew as a member of the Mustache Gang with the A's. Reds owner Marge Schott ultimately reversed the policy on February 16, 1999, in a bid to retain outfielder Greg Vaughn, who lobbied to retain the goatee he had grown with the San Diego Padres.

Ironically, Howsam had tried similar measures to establish uniformity as an executive for the St. Louis Cardinals prior to joining the Reds. One measure including matching jackets with team logos when the Cardinals travelled as a team. Hall of Fame pitcher Bob Gibson later wrote that the jackets "made them look like a damn glee club."

Girardi, who had previously caught for the New York Yankees, decided to implement Steinbrenner's policy when he became the manager of the Florida Marlins in 2006. Although Girardi's tenure with the Marlins lasted for only one season, Mattingly attempted to resurrect his facial hair policies ten years later when he was appointed the Marlins' manager, a decision which was criticized considering his own history with the Yankee's policy. Mattingly softened the Marlins' grooming policy before the 2017 season, and when Derek Jeter, another former Yankee, became CEO of the franchise in 2018, he promised that players could keep their facial hair as long as it was "well groomed".

Outside of Major League Baseball, National Hockey League executive Lou Lamoriello also enforced a similar rule in his stints as general manager with the New Jersey Devils, Toronto Maple Leafs and New York Islanders, though he often allowed his players to grow a playoff beard whenever his teams made the Stanley Cup playoffs.

== See also ==
- Logos and uniforms of the New York Yankees
- The Mustache Gang
- NBA dress code
