= Joe Molloy =

American baseball executive

Joseph Anthony Molloy (born March 13, 1961) is an American teacher and baseball executive. He was the managing general partner of the New York Yankees of Major League Baseball from 1988 to 1998. He served as acting owner during the suspension of George Steinbrenner from 1992 to 1993.

== Career ==
Molloy attended St. Lawrence Catholic School and Tampa Catholic High School in Tampa, Florida. He attended a seminary for six months after high school. After deciding against clergyhood, Molloy obtained his college degree and became a science and physical education teacher at St. Lawrence. He also coached the school's basketball team.

Molloy joined the front office of the New York Yankees of Major League Baseball (MLB) in 1988. He was promoted to vice president in 1989.

George Steinbrenner, the owner of the Yankees, was banned from the Yankees in 1990 for his association with a known gambler, whom he hired to find dirt on Dave Winfield. Hank Steinbrenner, George's oldest son, declined the opportunity to run the Yankees. Robert Nederlander, a limited partner in the Yankees, served as managing general partner for 16 months before resigning. Daniel McCarthy, also a limited partner, was rejected by the commissioner. The Yankees then appointed Molloy in February 1992. He was unanimously approved.

Under Molloy's leadership, the Yankees invested money into player development and scouting. He green-lit the selection of Derek Jeter in the 1992 MLB draft. Steinbrenner was reinstated on March 1, 1993, and Molloy remained a general partner. Molloy planned the development of Legends Field as a new spring training complex for the Yankees. He was also involved in hiring Bob Watson as the team's new general manager.

In 1997, Molloy requested a one-year leave of absence from the Yankees due to the stress of the job and George's managing style. He officially resigned from the Yankees in February. After leaving the Yankees, he returned to teaching.

In 2017, Molloy joined a group that attempted to purchase the Miami Marlins of MLB. In 2025, he formed a group that is seeking to purchase MLB's Tampa Bay Rays.

== Personal life ==
Molloy married Jessica Steinbrenner. Their first date occurred during the 1986 Hall of Fame Bowl and they married on November 7, 1987, at St. Patrick's Cathedral in New York. They separated in January 1998 and filed for divorce in March.

Joe and Jessica's son, Robert, is a film producer. He runs the production company Pinstripe Productions.

== See also ==
- Steinbrenner family
