= Howard Spira =

American gambler (born 1959)

- Born: 1959 (age 66–67); The Bronx, New York, U.S.
- Education: New York University
- Occupations: Gangster gambler journalist
- Known for: Extorting George Steinbrenner; Informing on the Five Families of the American Mafia

Howard Spira (born 1959) is an American gambler who was central to Fay Vincent's decision to ban George Steinbrenner from baseball during the 1990s. In 1991, he was convicted of trying to extort $110,000 from Steinbrenner and spent over two years in prison.

== Early life and education ==
Howard Spira was born in 1959 in the Bronx to poor parents. Spira attended New York University, studying broadcast journalism, but dropped out in 1980.

== FBI informant ==
During the 1980s, Spira was an informant for the Federal Bureau of Investigation against the Five Families.

== Steinbrenner and Winfield ==
In the late 1980s Spira, claimed to work as an unpaid publicist for Dave Winfield's foundation was in debt and contacted Steinbrenner, who was in a conflict with Winfield over payments to Winfield's charitable foundation. Spira offered to provide proof Winfield was misusing charitable funds in exchange for Steinbrenner paying him $150,000, giving him a job, and providing him a room in a hotel owned by Joan Steinbrenner. In January of 1990, Steinbrenner paid him $40,000.

Steinbrenner was suspended from baseball for three years for paying Spira $40,000 to find dirt on Winfield.

Spira was the subject of a 2016 film, The Rise and Fall of Howie Spira.

== Personal life ==
As of 2011, Spira lived with his parents in The Bronx.
