= James Hinchcliffe =

Canadian racing driver and commentator (born 1986)

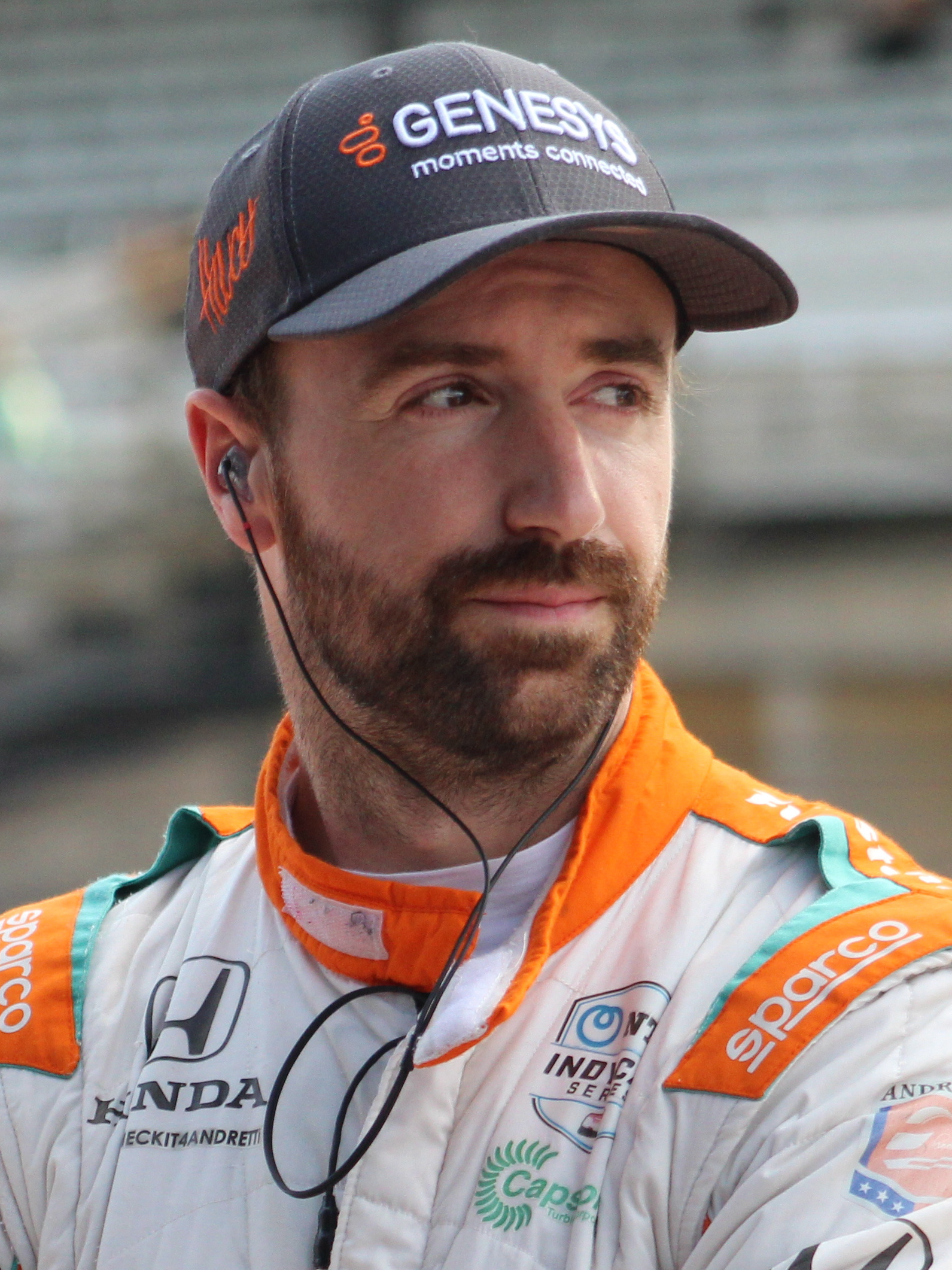
- Hinchcliffe at the Indianapolis Motor Speedway in 2021
- Nationality: (Canada) Canadian
- Born: December 5, 1986 (age 39) North York, Ontario, Canada

IMSA SportsCar Championship career
- Debut season: 2014
- Current team: Pfaff Motorsports
- Categorisation: FIA Gold
- Car number: 9
- Former teams: Mazda Motorsports, SpeedSource, Starworks Motorsport
- Starts: 9
- Wins: 0
- Podiums: 0
- Poles: 0
- Fastest laps: 0
- Best finish: 20th in 2025

Previous series
- 2009–10 2006–08 2006–07 2005 2004: Indy Lights; Atlantic Championship; A1 Grand Prix; Star Mazda Series; Formula BMW USA

Awards
- 2010 2011 2012, 2018 2024: Greg Moore Legacy Award; IndyCar Rookie of the Year; Indycar Series Most Popular Driver; Tony Renna Rising Star Award; CMHF Inductee

IndyCar Series career
- 161 races run over 11 years
- 2020 position: 23rd
- Best finish: 8th (2012, 2013)
- First race: 2011 Indy Grand Prix of Alabama (Barber)
- Last race: 2021 Acura Grand Prix of Long Beach (Long Beach)
- First win: 2013 Honda Grand Prix of St. Petersburg (St. Petersburg)
- Last win: 2018 Iowa Corn 300 (Iowa)
Wins	Podiums	Poles
6	18	1

NASCAR FedEx Freight Truck Series career
- 1 race run over 1 year
- 2026 position: 60th
- Best finish: 60th (2026)
- First race: 2026 OnlyBulls Green Flag 150 (St. Petersburg)
Wins	Top tens	Poles
0	1	0

James Douglas Meredith Hinchcliffe (born December 5, 1986) is a Canadian racing driver. He is best known for competing in the IndyCar Series from 2011 until 2021. He is also a commentator for IndyCar broadcasts on FOX Sports and occasional Formula One broadcasts on F1TV.

Hinchcliffe won the 2011 IndyCar Rookie of the Year award driving for Newman/Haas Racing, and six races for Andretti Autosport and Schmidt Peterson Motorsports.

In 2015, his first year driving for Schmidt Peterson, he suffered life-threatening blood loss when he was impaled in a crash when his suspension failed while practicing for the Indianapolis 500. He would recover and win the pole position for the following year's race and finished in seventh position.

Also, in 2016, Hinchcliffe appeared on Season 23 of the ABC series Dancing with the Stars, finishing in second place. He is often called by his nicknames "Hinch" and "the Mayor of Hinchtown".

== Racing career ==
=== Early racing ===
Born in North York, Ontario, and raised in Oakville, Ontario, Hinchcliffe first attended an IndyCar race with his father when he was 18 months old. He later recalled watching Jacques Villeneuve win the Indianapolis 500 on television in 1995.

This event inspired him to start his racing career when he received a go kart for his ninth birthday and began racing cars in 2003, when he finished third in Bridgestone Racing Academy F2000 series. The following year, he was the top rookie in Formula BMW USA, winning three races. In 2005, he raced in the Star Mazda Series, finishing third overall with three wins.

Then in 2006, he moved to the Champ Car Atlantic Series with Forsythe Racing. He won one race at Portland and scored two other podiums, and finished tenth in the overall standings. Hinchcliffe also provided commentary for the Eurosport coverage of Champ Car events during the 2006 and 2007 seasons.

=== A1 Grand Prix ===
Hinchcliffe then joined A1 Team Canada in A1 Grand Prix. He finished eighth in the sprint race and thirteenth in the feature race at Zandvoort, then had a stunning weekend in Brno. He scored second in the sprint race at the Czech round and led the feature for the majority of the race, but clashed with eventual winner Alex Yoong which dropped him down to fifth.

He raced next at the Beijing round, finishing fourth in the sprint race and tenth in the feature race – which he could have won, but for an error in the team pitstop strategy – and then returned after two races out at the New Zealand round, where he finished sixth in both races.

Hinchcliffe once again raced in the Champ Car Atlantic Series in 2007, this time with the Sierra Sierra team. He finished fourth in points without a win. During that season, he was also a guest commentator on the international feed for Champ Car races. He returned to Forsythe Racing for the 2008 Atlantic Championship season, again finishing fourth in points, but this time capturing a win in the second race of the season at Mazda Raceway Laguna Seca.

=== Firestone Indy Lights Series ===
For the 2009 season, Hinchcliffe competed in Indy Lights for Sam Schmidt Motorsports in their No. 7 car. Hinchcliffe finished fourth in points without a win or pole position. In the 2010 season, he signed on with Team Moore Racing in their No. 2 entry. Hinchcliffe captured three wins and five more podium finishes on his way to placing second in the championship behind French rookie Jean-Karl Vernay who was driving the Schmidt No. 7 car.

Hinchcliffe also served as the driver analyst for the Indianapolis Motor Speedway Radio Network for the 2010 Indianapolis 500 as regular driver analyst Davey Hamilton was competing in the race.

=== IndyCar Series ===
==== Newman/Haas Racing (2011) ====
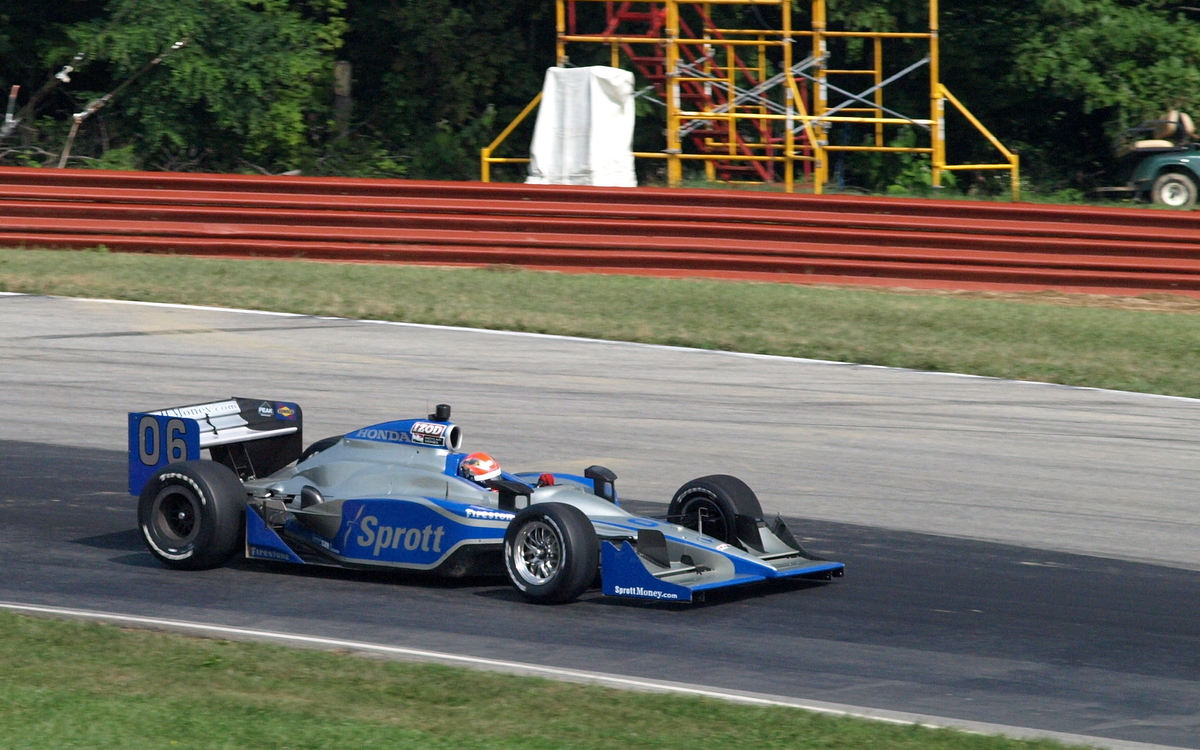
Hinchcliffe at Mid-Ohio in 2011.

In April 2011, Hinchcliffe signed with Newman/Haas Racing to compete in the remainder of 2011 IndyCar Series, excluding the Twin Ring Motegi race, after missing the first race of the season at St. Petersburg. He made his debut at Barber Motorsports Park and failed to finish after making contact with a spinning E. J. Viso. He then picked up his first career top-five finish in just his second start in the series on the Streets of Long Beach with a fourth place finish. Hinchcliffe then collected a top-ten on the Streets of São Paulo in Brazil. He finished ninth. Hinchcliffe started 13th in his first Indianapolis 500, and ran up front for an early portion of the race before crashing on lap 101 and finishing 29th.

Following the Indy 500 was the Firestone Twin 275s in Texas. Hinchcliffe struggled in both races and had finishes of twentieth and nineteenth, respectively. Hinchcliffe rebounded to collect his second top-ten of the season with a sixth at the Milwaukee Mile.

During the 2011 IZOD IndyCar World Championship on lap twelve, Hinchcliffe veered down, making wheel-to-wheel contact with Wade Cunningham, which caused the latter to spin out, collecting cars, and ultimately led to a chain reaction which resulted in the death of Dan Wheldon. Subsequently, the race was cancelled due to Wheldon's death. Points were reset to how it was as of Kentucky, so Hinchcliffe collected Rookie of the Year Honors, beating out Panther Racing's J. R. Hildebrand. However, after the 2011 IndyCar season, it was announced that Newman/Haas Racing would not be returning to IndyCar, making Hinchcliffe a free agent.

==== Andretti Autosport (2012–14) ====
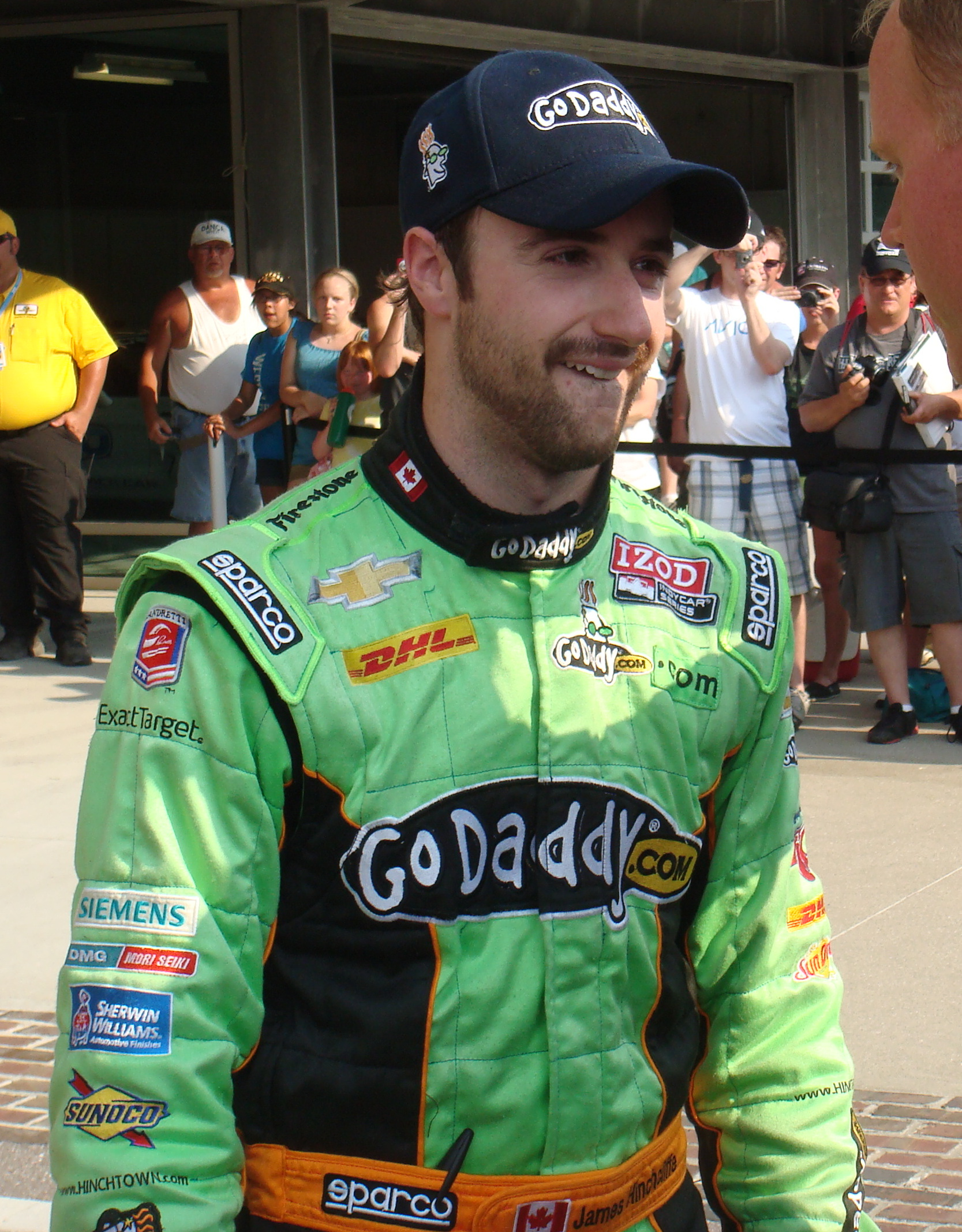
Hinchcliffe in 2013

On January 10, 2012, it was announced that Hinchcliffe would succeed Danica Patrick as the driver of the GoDaddy car for Andretti Autosport. The car was renumbered to No. 27, the same number used by Canadian drivers Gilles Villeneuve and Jacques Villeneuve.

At the 2012 Indianapolis 500, Hinchcliffe qualified second overall while carrying a pair of gloves inside his driving suit that belonged to the late Greg Moore, whom Hinchcliffe considers the main reason why he got into racing. On race day, Hinchcliffe overtook pole-sitter Ryan Briscoe on the first lap, and ended up leading five of the 200 laps on his way to a creditable sixth place finish.

Hinchcliffe returned to Team Andretti for 2013, and started the season by winning the opener in St. Petersburg, Florida, for his first series victory. Later in Brazil, for the São Paulo Indy 300, Hinchcliffe won the race, with a last turn overtake under Takuma Sato, breaking the winning sequence of Will Power.

In the 2014 Grand Prix of Indianapolis, Hinchcliffe was hit by debris, and a CT scan revealed he had suffered a concussion, and needed medical clearance before racing again. Hinchcliffe was cleared to return to racing on May 15, five days after the incident.

==== Schmidt Peterson Motorsports (2015–2019) ====
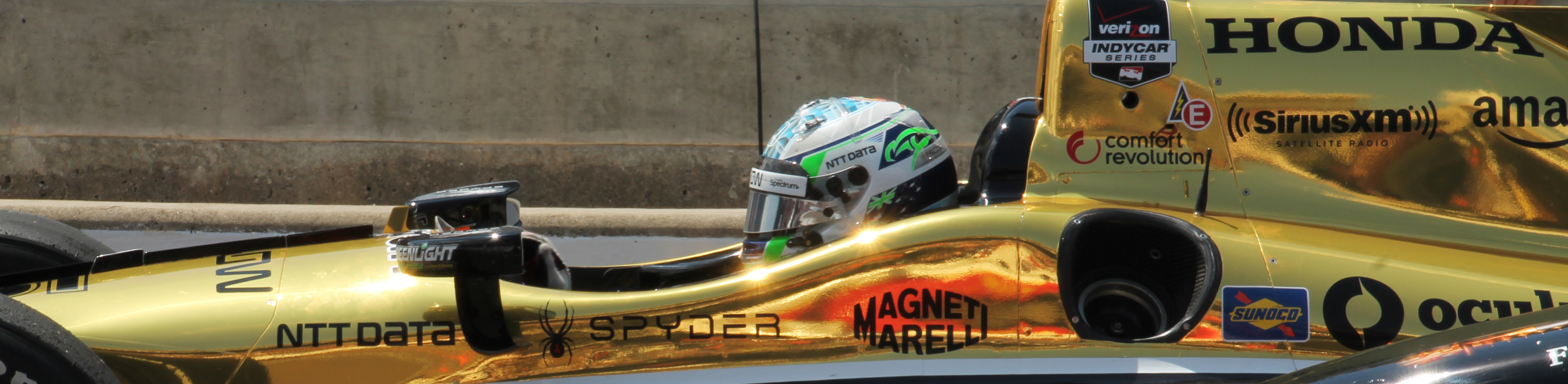
Hinchcliffe's No. 5 IndyCar was piloted by Ryan Briscoe during the 2015 Indianapolis 500.

On October 7, 2014, it was announced that Hinchcliffe would join Schmidt Peterson Motorsports for the 2015 season and drive the No. 5 car, filling the open seat left by Simon Pagenaud.

He won his first race with the team in the second race of the year in New Orleans. Hinchcliffe qualified for the 2015 Indianapolis 500 on May 17, then sustained serious injuries in a crash caused by a suspension failure during practice. The right side of the car disintegrated, and he was pinned in the cockpit; one of the suspension pieces had penetrated the cockpit tub, and punctured Hinchcliffe's thigh, causing profuse bleeding. He was taken to Methodist Hospital for surgery to remove the debris from his thigh, and the quick response work by IndyCar safety crews was credited with saving his life. He remained hospitalized during the race and Ryan Briscoe took Hinchcliffe's position for the race. Briscoe and Conor Daly replaced Hinchcliffe in the car for the remainder of the 2015 season.

On May 22, 2016, Hinchcliffe won the pole position for the 100th running of the Indianapolis 500, a year after his near-fatal crash at the track. He finished seventh in the race. Hinchcliffe led much of the Firestone 600 later that year, only to finish second in a photo finish to Graham Rahal. He went on to finish thirteenth in the season standings.

On April 9, 2017, two years after his last win, Hinchcliffe won his first race of the season at the Long Beach Grand Prix.

Leena Gade became Hinchcliffe's lead race engineer for the 2018 season, becoming the first female lead race engineer in the history of Indycar. On Bump Day at the 2018 Indianapolis 500, Hinchcliffe ended up failing to qualify for the race for the first time in his career. Afterward, Gade and SPM parted ways. In July, Hinchcliffe rebounded to win at Iowa.

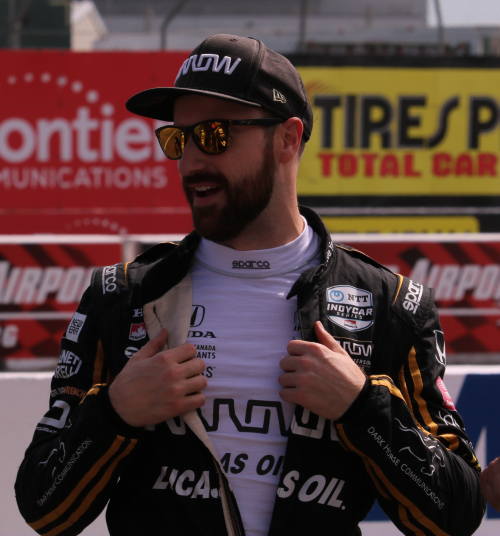
Hinchcliffe in 2019

On October 28, 2019, after a season which resulted in a third place finish at Iowa, the recently renamed Arrow McLaren SP relieved Hinchcliffe of his driving duties and signed 2019 Indy Lights champion Oliver Askew and former Carlin driver and 2018 Indy Lights champion Pato O' Ward to fill their two seats. Hinchcliffe remained under contract and he was required to be with the team on race weekends and make sponsor appearances, but was free to pursue other opportunities.

==== Return to Andretti Autosport (2020–2021) ====
On February 19, 2020, Andretti Autosport announced they signed Hinchcliffe to a three-race deal for the 2020 season which would be his second stint with the team. Hinchcliffe was scheduled to compete in the GMR Grand Prix, the Indianapolis 500, and the Genesys 600. Hinchcliffe finished eighteenth at the first race at Texas Motor Speedway. He finished eleventh in the Indy GP and seventh in the Indianapolis 500. He would then replace Zach Veach for the final three races of the season in the No 26 car after the latter was fired by Andretti.

On January 26, 2021, Andretti Autosport announced that Hinchcliffe would drive the No. 29 car, co-entered by Steinbrenner Racing, full time for the 2021 season. He finished twentieth in the points standings, with a best result being third at the inaugural Music City Grand Prix.

On December 12, 2021, Hinchcliffe announced he was stepping down from racing full-time, and joined NBC Sports as a commentator for the IndyCar Series broadcast from the 2022 season onwards. He was replaced in the No. 29 entry by Devlin DeFrancesco.

=== NASCAR ===
On February 12, 2026, it was announced that Hinchcliffe will make his debut in the NASCAR Craftsman Truck Series at the St. Petersburg street circuit, driving the No. 77 Chevrolet for Spire Motorsports.

== Personal life ==
Hinchcliffe became engaged to his high school sweetheart, Canadian actress Rebecca "Becky" Dalton, in July 2018; the couple wed in Ontario on August 3, 2019.

If he did not succeed as a professional racing driver, Hinchcliffe wanted to be a motorsports journalist.

On February 17, 2024, Hinchcliffe was inducted into the Canadian Motorsport Hall of Fame, making him the youngest inductee ever at 37 years old.

== Motorsports career results ==
=== Complete A1 Grand Prix results ===
(key) (Races in italics indicate fastest lap)

Year	Entrant	1	2	3	4	5	6	7	8	9	10	11	12	13	14	15	16	17	18	19	20	21	22	DC	Points	Ref
2006–07	Canada	NED; SPR; 8	NED; FEA; 13	CZE; SPR; 2	CZE; FEA; 5	CHN; SPR; 4	CHN; FEA; 10	MYS; SPR	MYS; FEA	IDN; SPR	IDN; FEA	NZL; SPR; 6	NZL; FEA; 6	AUS; SPR; 13	AUS; FEA; Ret	RSA; SPR; 13	RSA; FEA; Ret	MEX; SPR; 13	MEX; FEA; 15	CHN; SPR	CHN; FEA	GBR; SPR	GBR; FEA	11th	33	
2007–08	Canada	NED; SPR; 19	NED; FEA; 18	CZE; SPR; 12	CZE; FEA; 11	MYS; SPR	MYS; FEA	ZHU; SPR	ZHU; FEA	NZL; SPR	NZL; FEA	AUS; SPR	AUS; FEA	RSA; SPR	RSA; FEA	MEX; SPR	MEX; FEA	SHA; SPR	SHA; FEA	GBR; SPR; 15	GBR; FEA; 17			9th	75	

=== American open–wheel racing results ===
(key)

==== Atlantic Championship ====
Year	Team	1	2	3	4	5	6	7	8	9	10	11	12	Rank	Points
2006	Forsythe Racing	LBH; 3	HOU; 4	MTY; 16	POR; 1	CLE1; 17	CLE2; 19	TOR; 6	EDM; Ret	SJO; Ret	DEN; 7	**MTL**; 3	ROA; Ret	10th	160
2007	Sierra Sierra Enterprises	LVG; 4	LBH; 7	HOU; 3	**POR1**; 2	**POR2**; 2	CLE; 6	MTT; 3	TOR; Ret	**EDM1**; 3	EDM2; 9	SJO; Ret	ROA; 14	4th	224
2008	Forsythe Racing	LBH; 10	**LS**; 1	MTT; 4	**EDM1**; 3	EDM2; 3	ROA1; 5	ROA2; 8	TRR; Ret	NJ; 16	UTA; 10	ATL; 3		4th	196

==== Indy Lights ====
Year	Team	1	2	3	4	5	6	7	8	9	10	11	12	13	14	15	Rank	Points	Ref
2009	Sam Schmidt Motorsports	STP1; 6	STP2; 3	LBH; 3	KAN; 12	INDY; 16	MIL; 7	IOW; 3	WGL; 21	TOR; 3	EDM; 4	KTY; 7	MOH; 2	SNM; 6	CHI; 12	HMS; 14	5th	395	
2010	Team Moore Racing	**STP**; 15	ALA; 5	**LBH**; 1	INDY; 3	IOW; 5	**WGL**; 2	TOR; 10	**EDM**; 1	MOH; 7	SNM; 3	CHI; 1	KTY; 2	HMS; 2			2nd	471	

==== IndyCar Series ====
Year	Team	No.	Chassis	Engine	1	2	3	4	5	6	7	8	9	10	11	12	13	14	15	16	17	18	19	Rank	Points	Ref
2011	Newman/Haas Racing	06	Dallara IR05	Honda	STP	ALA; 24	LBH; 4	SAO; 9	INDY; 29	TXS; 20	TXS; 19	MIL; 6	IOW; 9	TOR; 14	EDM; 15	MOH; 20	NHM; 4	SNM; 7	BAL; 24	MOT; 15	KTY; 4	LVS^{1} C		12th	302	
2012	Andretti Autosport	27	Dallara DW12	Chevrolet	STP; 4	ALA; 6	LBH; 3	SAO; 6	INDY; 6	DET; 21	TXS; 4	MIL; 3	IOW; 17	TOR; 22	EDM; 12	MOH; 5	SNM; 26	BAL; 15	FON; 13					8th	358	
2013	Andretti Autosport	27	Dallara DW12	Chevrolet	STP; 1	ALA; 26	LBH; 26	SAO; 1	INDY; 21	DET; 15	DET; 19	TXS; 9	MIL; 5	IOW; 1	POC; 24	TOR; 8	TOR; 21	MOH; 10	SNM; 8	BAL; 7	HOU; 24	HOU; 3	FON; 4	8th	449	
2014	Andretti Autosport	27	Dallara DW12	Honda	STP; 19	LBH; 21	ALA; 7	IMS; 20	INDY; 28	DET; 6	DET; 5	TXS; 14	HOU; 5	HOU; 14	POC; 12	IOW; 6	TOR; 8	TOR; 18	MOH; 3	MIL; 19	SNM; 12	FON; 5		12th	456	
2015	Schmidt Peterson Motorsports	5	Dallara DW12	Honda	STP; 16	NLA; 1	LBH; 12	ALA; 7	IMS; 12	INDY; Wth	DET	DET	TXS	TOR	FON	MIL	IOW	MOH	POC	SNM				23rd	129	
2016	Schmidt Peterson Motorsports	5	Dallara DW12	Honda	STP; 19	PHX; 18	LBH; 8	ALA; 6	IMS; 3	**INDY**; 7	DET; 18	DET; 21	RDA; 14	IOW; 9	TOR; 3	MOH; 5	POC; 10	TXS; 2	WGL; 18	SNM; 12				13th	416	
2017	Schmidt Peterson Motorsports	5	Dallara DW12	Honda	STP; 9	LBH; 1	ALA; 6	PHX; 12	IMS; 13	INDY; 22	DET; 3	DET; 20	TXS; 14	ROA; 20	IOW; 10	TOR; 3	MOH; 11	POC; 20	GMP; 8	WGL; 21	SNM; 22			13th	376	
2018	Schmidt Peterson Motorsports	5	Dallara DW12	Honda	STP; 4	PHX; 6	LBH; 9	ALA; 3	IMS; 7	INDY; DNQ	DET; 11	DET; 16	TXS; 4	ROA; 10	IOW; 1	TOR; 4	MOH; 14	POC; 20	GTW; 15	POR; 22	SNM; 15			10th	391	
2019	Arrow Schmidt Peterson Motorsports	5	Dallara DW12	Honda	STP; 6	COA; 16	ALA; 6	LBH; 9	IMS; 16	INDY; 11	DET; 9	DET; 18	TXS; 19	RDA; 7	TOR; 6	IOW; 3	MOH; 22	POC; 20	GTW; 12	POR; 20	LAG; 9			12th	370	
2020	Andretti Autosport	29	Dallara DW12	Honda	TXS; 18	IMS; 11	ROA	ROA	IOW	IOW	INDY; 7	GTW	GTW	MOH	MOH									23rd	138	
2020	Andretti Autosport	26	Dallara DW12	Honda												IMS; 14	IMS; 13	STP; 14						23rd	138	
2021	Andretti Steinbrenner Autosport	29	Dallara DW12	Honda	ALA; 17	STP; 18	TXS; 23	TXS; 18	IMS; 18	INDY; 21	DET; 17	DET; 14	ROA; 15	MOH; 17	NSH; 3	IMS; 22	GTW; 15	POR; 27	LAG; 20	LBH; 14				20th	220	

- ^{1} The Las Vegas Indy 300 was abandoned after Dan Wheldon died from injuries sustained in a 15-car crash on lap 11.

Years	Teams	Races	Poles	Wins	Top 5s	Top 10s	Indianapolis 500 wins	Championships	Ref
10	3	145	1	6	32	70	0	0	

==== Indianapolis 500 ====
Year	Chassis	Engine	Start	Finish	Team
2011	Dallara	Honda	13	29	Newman/Haas Racing
2012	Dallara	Chevrolet	2	6	Andretti Autosport
2013	Dallara	Chevrolet	9	21	Andretti Autosport
2014	Dallara	Honda	2	28	Andretti Autosport
2015	Dallara	Honda	Wth		Schmidt Peterson Motorsports
2016	Dallara	Honda	**1**	7	Schmidt Peterson Motorsports
2017	Dallara	Honda	17	22	Schmidt Peterson Motorsports
2018	Dallara	Honda	DNQ		Schmidt Peterson Motorsports
2019	Dallara	Honda	32	11	Arrow Schmidt Peterson Motorsports
2020	Dallara	Honda	6	7	Andretti Autosport
2021	Dallara	Honda	16	21	Andretti Steinbrenner Autosport

=== Touring Car racing ===
==== V8 Supercar results ====
Year	Team	No.	Car	1	2	3	4	5	6	7	8	9	10	11	12	13	14	15	16	17	18	19	20	21	22	23	24	25	26	27	28	29	30	31	Final pos	Points	Ref
2012	Garry Rogers Motorsport	34	Holden VE Commodore	ADE; R1	ADE; R2	SYM; R3	SYM; R4	HAM; R5	HAM; R6	BAR; R7	BAR; R8	BAR; R9	PHI; R10	PHI; R11	HID; R12	HID; R13	TOW; R14	TOW; R15	QLD; R16	QLD; R17	SMP; R18	SMP; R19	SAN; Q	SAN; R20	BAT; R21	SUR; R22; Ret	SUR; R23; Ret	YMC; R24	YMC; R25	YMC; R26	WIN; R27	WIN; R28	SYD; R29	SYD; R30	NC	0 †	
2019	Walkinshaw Andretti United	27	Holden ZB Commodore	ADE; R1	ADE; R2	MEL; R3	MEL; R4	MEL; R5	MEL; R6	SYM; R7	SYM; R8	PHI; R9	PHI; R10	BAR; R11	BAR; R12	WIN; R13	WIN; R14	HID; R15	HID; R16	TOW; R17	TOW; R18	QLD; R19	QLD; R20	BEN; R21	BEN; R22	PUK; R23	PUK; R24	BAT; R25; 18	SUR; R26	SUR; R27	SAN; QR	SAN; R28	NEW; R29	NEW; R30	51st	102	

† Not eligible for points

==== Complete Bathurst 1000 results ====
Year	Team	Car	Co-driver	Position	Laps	Ref
2019	Walkinshaw Andretti United	Holden Commodore ZB	(United States) Alexander Rossi	18th	159	

=== Complete IMSA SportsCar Championship ===
Year	Team	Class	Chassis	Engine	1	2	3	4	5	6	7	8	9	10	11	Rank	Points
2014	SpeedSource	P	Mazda Prototype	Mazda 2.2 L SKYACTIV-D (SH-VPTS) I4 Turbo (diesel)	DAY; 14	SEB	LBH	LGA	DET	WGL	MOS	IMS				52nd	19
2014	Starworks Motorsport	P	Riley Mk XXVI DP	Honda HR35TT 3.5 L V6 Turbo									ELK; 12	COA	PET	52nd	19
2015	SpeedSource	P	Mazda Prototype	Mazda 2.2 L SKYACTIV-D (SH-VPTS) I4 Turbo (diesel)	DAY; 12	SEB	LBH	LGA	DET	WGL	MOS	ELK	COA	PET		31st	20
2017	Mazda Motorsports	P	Mazda RT24-P	Mazda MZ-2.0T 2.0 L Turbo I4	DAY; 12	SEB	LBH	COA	DET	WGL	MOS	ELK	LGA	PET		42nd	19
2024	Pfaff Motorsports	GTD Pro	McLaren 720S GT3 Evo	McLaren M840T 4.0 L Turbo V8	DAY; 10	SEB; 12	LGA	DET	WGL	MOS	ELK	VIR	IMS	PET; 9		26th	691
2025	Pfaff Motorsports	GTD Pro	Lamborghini Huracán GT3 Evo 2	Lamborghini DGF 5.2 L V10	DAY; 13	SEB; 10	LGA	DET	WGL	MOS	ELK	VIR	IMS	PET; 10		20th	649
2026	Pfaff Motorsports	GTD Pro	Lamborghini Huracán GT3 Evo 2	Lamborghini DGF 5.2 L V10	DAY; 6	SEB	LGA	DET	WGL	MOS	ELK	VIR	IMS	PET		35th	271

=== NASCAR ===
(key) (Bold – Pole position awarded by qualifying time. Italics – Pole position earned by points standings or practice time. * – Most laps led.)

==== Craftsman Truck Series ====
NASCAR Craftsman Truck Series results
Year	Team	No.	Make	1	2	3	4	5	6	7	8	9	10	11	12	13	14	15	16	17	18	19	20	21	22	23	24	25	NCTC	Pts	Ref
2026	Spire Motorsports	77	Chevy	DAY	ATL	STP; 10	DAR	CAR	BRI	TEX	GLN	DOV	CLT	NSS	MCH	COR	LRP	NWS	IRP	RCH	NHA	BRI	KAN	CLT	PHO	TAL	MAR	HOM	60th	27	

^{*} Season still in progress.

== In media ==
On August 30, 2016, he appeared on an episode of Celebrity Family Feud featuring IndyCar drivers competing against swimsuit models. Hinchcliffe is a partner with production company Frost Marks Films out of Toronto. He maintained his podcast The Mayor on Air with James Hinchcliffe from 2015 through 2017, typically interviewing drivers from the IndyCar Series. He and fellow IndyCar driver Alexander Rossi host a podcast together called Off Track with Hinch and Rossi.

=== Television analyst and commentator ===
Hinchcliffe’s first experience commentating came in 2006 when he was invited into the broadcast booth for an International Champ Car race. What was initially planned as a brief segment extended into coverage for the entire event, marking the beginning of his media career.

In 2020, Hinchcliffe joined NBC Sports as analyst for IndyCar races and select IMSA races when he did not enter as a driver. In 2022, he rejoined NBC Sports as a full-time analyst joining play-by-play voice Leigh Diffey and analyst Townsend Bell, replacing fellow Canadian Paul Tracy, and will serve as an analyst for some IMSA races. In October 2022, Hinchcliffe joined the crew of F1's Weekend Warmup for its Grand Prix week editions for the United States Grand Prix and the Mexico City Grand Prix, and in the Post Race Show at the Sao Paulo Grand Prix and Abu Dhabi Grand Prix. In 2023 he became an occasional co-commentator on Channel 4's F1 coverage in the United Kingdom as well as the official F1TV feed. As of 2025, Hinchcliffe is one of the main commentators for the NTT IndyCar series for Fox, alongside Will Buxton and Townsend Bell. Hinchcliffe also commentates on select Formula 1 races for F1TV.

=== Dancing with the Stars ===
On August 30, 2016, Hinchcliffe was announced as one of the celebrity contestants for season 23 of Dancing with the Stars. He was partnered with professional dancer Sharna Burgess. On November 22, 2016, Hinchcliffe finished in second place to Olympic gymnast Laurie Hernandez.

Week #	Dance / song	Judges' scores				Result
Week #	Dance / song	Inaba	Goodman	Hough	Tonioli	Result
1	Foxtrot/"Live Life"	8	8	7	8	No Elimination
2	Paso Doble/"The Walking Dead Theme"	7	7	7	8	Safe
3	Cha-cha-cha/"Big Trouble"	7	7	8	7	Safe (Immunity)
4	Quickstep/"The Hollywood Wiz"	9	10	9	10	Safe
5	Tango/"The Right Time"	10	10	9	10	No Elimination
6	Rumba/"Need the Sun to Break"	10	9	9	10	Safe
7	Jitterbug/"In the Mood"; Team Freestyle/"The Skye Boat Song"	9; 10	9; 9	9; 9	9; 10	Safe
8	Viennese Waltz/"You Don't Own Me"	10	10	10	10	Safe (Immunity)
9	Jazz/"A Brand New Day"; Team-Up Dance (Paso Doble)/"No Good"	9; 9	9; 9	9; 10	9; 9	Safe
10; Semi-finals	Argentine Tango/"Santa Maria"; Trio Jive/"Gimme Some Lovin'"	9; 10	10; 10	10; 10	10; 10	Safe
11; Finals	Foxtrot/"It Had to Be You"; Freestyle/"Beethoven's 5 Secrets"; Viennese Waltz & Foxtrot Fusion/"Over and Over Again"	9; 10; 10	9; 10; 10	9; 10; 10	10; 10; 10	Runner-up

Sporting positions
Preceded by Alex Lloyd	IndyCar Series; Rookie of the Year; 2011	Succeeded by Simon Pagenaud
Awards and achievements
Preceded by Paige VanZant & Mark Ballas	Dancing with the Stars (US) runner up Season 23 (Fall 2016 with Sharna Burgess)	Succeeded by David Ross & Lindsay Arnold
