= Steve Swindal =

American businessman

- Born: Tampa, Florida
- Education: University of North Carolina at Chapel Hill
- Office: Chairman of the Port Tampa Bay
- Spouse: Jennifer Steinbrenner (m. 1983; div. 2007)

Stephen Whitfield Swindal is an American businessman. He is the chairman of Port Tampa Bay. Swindal was a general partner of the New York Yankees of Major League Baseball from 1998 through 2007, and in 2005 had been chosen as George Steinbrenner's successor as head of the Yankees.

== Biography ==
=== Early life and education ===
Swindal graduated from Berkeley Preparatory School in Tampa, Florida, and the University of North Carolina at Chapel Hill (UNC). He earned his bachelor's degree in history in 1976. He hoped to become a doctor, but was not accepted into medical school, and he then took postgraduate coursework in biology at the University of Florida. He returned to Tampa to work for his family's furniture wholesale company.

=== Career with New York Yankees ===
Swindal met Jennifer Steinbrenner, a UNC alum and daughter of New York Yankees principal owner George Steinbrenner, through a mutual friend in Tampa. They married in 1983. Swindal initially continued working for his family's business, but eventually joined the American Shipbuilding Company, owned by George Steinbrenner. He then ran a tugboat company Steinbrenner owned until it was sold in 1995. Swindal then joined the Yankees front office. He became a general partner of the team and chairman of Yankee Global Enterprises, including a financial stake. Swindal led the Yankees in negotiating a contract extension with manager Joe Torre in 2004. In June 2005, he was named by Steinbrenner to be his eventual successor as head of the Yankees.

=== Arrest and buyout ===
In February 2007, Swindal was arrested for driving under the influence (DUI) of alcohol. He had been driving to his boat, where he planned to sleep for the night. The following month, he and Jennifer released a statement saying that they were in the process of a divorce. The Yankees bought out Swindal's stake of the franchise in September; Hal Steinbrenner succeeded him as chairman of Yankee Global Enterprises. Swindal pled no contest to DUI in November, agreeing to a suspension of his driver's license for six months, a year of probation, and 50 hours of community service.

=== Post Yankees career ===
In 2007, Swindal became chairman of Marine Towing, a tugboat business when he bought out the Steinbrenner family stake. Charlie Crist, the Governor of Florida, appointed him to the board of Port Tampa Bay in 2008. The next year, he opened a baseball academy in Boca Chica, Dominican Republic, with Hans Hertell, a former United States Ambassador to the Dominican Republic, and Abel Guerra, a former Yankees front office executive. Swindal became vice chairman of the board of Port Tampa Bay. When the chairman resigned in 2013, Swindal succeeded him. Governor Rick Scott reappointed Swindal as chairman in 2018.

=== Family ===
Swindal has two children: Haley and Stephen Jr. Both graduated from UNC. Haley is an actress who has appeared on Broadway and Stephen Jr. works in the baseball operations department of the Yankees.

== See also ==
- Steinbrenner family
