= Hank Steinbrenner =

American baseball executive (1957–2020)

- Born: Henry George Steinbrenner III; April 2, 1957; Culver, Indiana, U.S.
- Died: April 14, 2020 (aged 63); Clearwater, Florida, U.S.
- Occupations: Co-owner of New York Yankees / Managing general partner Minority partner Steinbrenner Racing
- Children: 4
- Parent(s): George Steinbrenner; Joan Steinbrenner

Henry George Steinbrenner III (April 2, 1957 – April 14, 2020) was an American businessman who was a part owner and co-chairman of the New York Yankees of Major League Baseball (MLB). He was the older brother of the team's principal owner and managing general partner Hal Steinbrenner.

== Early life ==
Steinbrenner was born in Culver, Indiana, the older son of George and Elizabeth Joan Steinbrenner (née Zieg), both of German descent. He had two sisters, Jessica Steinbrenner and Jennifer Steinbrenner (formerly Swindal). Hank was named for his grandfather, Henry George Steinbrenner II, who maintained the family fortune in the Kinsman Transit Company shipping business, inherited from Sophia Steinbrenner and her mother Anna Minch.

Steinbrenner attended Culver Academy and Central Methodist College, where he played soccer and earned a degree in history and political science.

== Career ==
In the 1980s, Steinbrenner worked for the New York Yankees, which his father bought while he attended Culver Academy, gaining experience in baseball working with executives Lou Piniella, Woody Woodward, and Clyde King. He played a key role in selecting Lou Piniella as manager in 1986. In 1990, when George was suspended from baseball, the Yankees initially suggested Hank would succeed George as the team's managing partner. The other MLB owners indicated they would not approve Hank, and he stepped away from the team.

Steinbrenner left baseball to run Kinsman Stable, the Steinbrenner-owned horse stable in Ocala, Florida. He also coached soccer at Vanguard High School in Ocala, became vice president and director of Bay Farms Corporation in 1985, and chairman of Minch Transit Company in 1987, and vice president of the Mid-Florida Hotels Corporation in 1990. He also served on the board of directors for the Ocala Breeders Sales Company. In 2000, he partnered with Gwynn Racing to field a car in the National Hot Rod Association.

From 2007 onward, George ceded most day-to-day control of the Yankees to Hal and Hank due to failing health.

During his stewardship of the Yankees, Hank, like his father, gained a reputation for being outspoken. He was at times criticized by many New York sports columnists for his off-the-cuff remarks that seemed to lack forethought. Despite his outspoken persona, Steinbrenner was not frequently seen around the team and instead did most of his work from the Yankees offices in Tampa, Florida. He did make a rare appearance in February 2015 to examine Yoan Moncada.

=== Controversial statements ===
Steinbrenner voiced his displeasure with the term Red Sox Nation in a 2008 interview:

Red Sox Nation? What a bunch of bullshit that is...That was a creation of the [Boston] Red Sox and ESPN, which is filled with Red Sox fans... Go anywhere in America and you won't see Red Sox hats and jackets, you'll see Yankee hats and jackets. This is a Yankee country. We're going to put the Yankees back on top and restore the universe to order.

In response, Red Sox principal owner John W. Henry inducted him into Red Sox Nation, complete with a membership card giving him access to an array of options, including the group newsletter, bumper stickers, pins, Green Monster seats, and a hat personally autographed by David Ortiz.

Concerning the Yankees' spring training feud with the Tampa Bay Rays in 2008, Steinbrenner stated, "I don't want these teams in general to forget who subsidizes a lot of them, and it's the Yankees, the Red Sox, Dodgers, Mets ... I would prefer if teams want to target the Yankees that they at least start giving some of that revenue sharing and luxury tax money back. From an owner's point of view, that's my point."

Regarding former Yankees manager Joe Torre, Steinbrenner said that his father did not get enough respect for hiring Torre in 1995, and that Joe Girardi has "... a little more fire in his belly" compared to Torre when it comes to managing. Steinbrenner went on to say that he would "support everything [Girardi] does" and "[Girardi] was the manager I wanted, and that's not anything towards Joe Torre. That's the manager we wanted at the time. Times change."

In September 2008, after the Yankees were eliminated from playoff contention for the first time since 1993, Steinbrenner penned an article in Sporting News criticizing Major League Baseball's divisional format.

== Personal life ==
Steinbrenner and his wife divorced in 2004. They had four children. His son, George Michael Steinbrenner IV, owns the IndyCar team Steinbrenner Racing, which fields a full-time entry in the IndyCar Series in partnership with Harding Racing under the banner of Harding Steinbrenner Racing.

Steinbrenner died on April 14, 2020, twelve days after his 63rd birthday, after a lengthy illness.

== See also ==
- Steinbrenner family
