= Sophia Steinbrenner =

American businesswoman (1854–1933)

- Born: Sophia Minch; September 14, 1854; Vermilion, Ohio, U.S.
- Died: December 13, 1933 (aged 79); Cleveland, Ohio, U.S.
- Occupation: President of Kinsman Transit

Sophia Steinbrenner (September 14, 1854 – December 13, 1933) was an American businesswoman and president of a Great Lakes shipping fleet, Kinsman Transit.

== Early life ==
Sophia Minch was born on September 14, 1854 to German-born Anna Christina (née Leimbach) and Philip Minch of Vermilion, Ohio. Her parents had settled in the area in the 1830s. Her father was trained as a shoemaker but moved into shipping and shipbuilding. The company, Kinsman Transit, was named for the street where the family lived, Kinsman Street, in Cleveland. The couple had eight children, four of whom died in infancy. Sophia, her sister Catherine Hassenflue, and two brothers survived to adulthood but all predeceased Sophia. Charles died age 20 and Peter drowned with his wife and two of their children when the SS Western Reserve sank in 1892.

== Business career ==
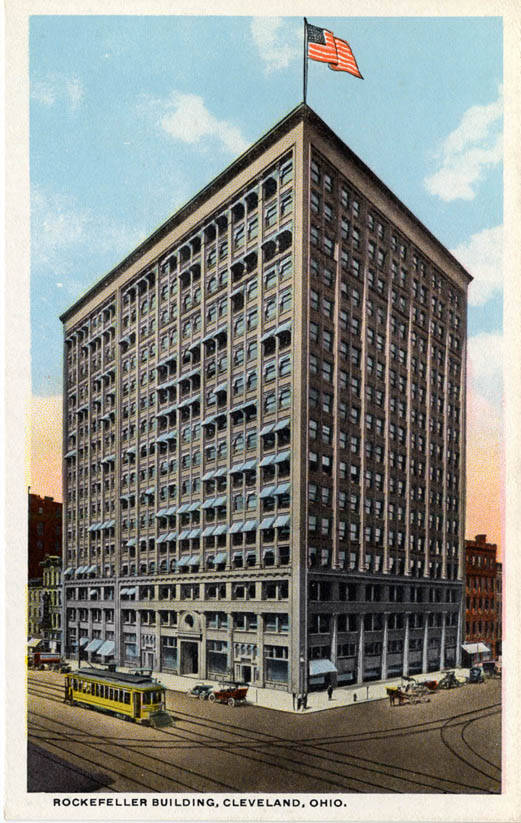
Rockefeller Building, Cleveland

Anna Minch took over Kinsman Transit when her husband died. When Anna died in 1905, Sophia took over the family business, a large shipping concern on the Great Lakes, with her husband Henry Steinbrenner as general manager. Four ships of the line were named SS Henry Steinbrenner. Their son, George M. Steinbrenner, became general manager when his father died in 1929.

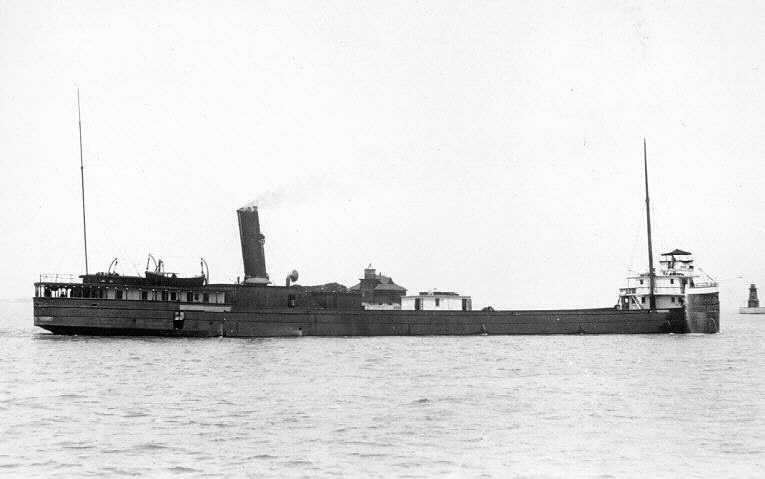
The Onoko underway

Sophia Steinbrenner "personally directed the movement of her vessels" and went to work at the company offices in the Rockefeller Building everyday throughout her career until shortly before her death.

In 1913, she reportedly stayed awake at her desk for three days straight until all her ships were accounted for following a storm which sank 14 other vessels.

The Steinbrenner family had shares in the SS Onoko, the first iron-hulled, iron-screw steam freighter on the Great Lakes and the prototype for all modern bulk freighters. Launched in 1884, it sank in Lake Superior in 1915 and was mentioned in Steinbrenner's New York Times obituary. The wreck was listed on the National Register of Historic Places in 1992.

== Personal life ==
Sophia Minch married Henry Steinbrenner (1849–1929) on December 24, 1874 in Vermilion. They had six children. She died at age 79 on December 13, 1933.

She was the great-grandmother of George Steinbrenner, who owned the New York Yankees for many years.

In 1884, the Sophia Minch, a large schooner built in 1873, and named after her by her father, ran aground in Cleveland.
