= Steinbrenner family =

American family of Irish-German descent

The Steinbrenners are an American family of Irish-German descent. The family has owned the New York Yankees of Major League Baseball since George Steinbrenner purchased the franchise in 1973. After George's death, Hal Steinbrenner, his son, became the chairman of the Yankees. The Steinbrenner family also has financial interests in real estate, horse racing, and automobile racing. Forbes estimated the Steinbrenner family to be worth $3.8 billion in 2015, making them the 75th richest family in the United States.

== First generation ==
Businessman George Steinbrenner owned the American Ship Building Company and served as its chairman, as well as purchasing sports franchises. He led a group that bought the New York Yankees from CBS in 1973 for $10 million ($72,526,237 in current dollar terms). He sold two garages included in the sale, reducing the purchase price to $8.8 million ($63,823,088 in current dollar terms). He invested $168,000 of his own money ($1,218,441 in current dollar terms) in the sale. In 2009, Forbes estimated the Yankees to be worth $1.5 billion. Steinbrenner died in July 2010.

George married Joan Zieg on May 12, 1956. Joan was a philanthropist and invested in real estate. Additionally, she served as a vice chairperson for the Yankees. She died in December 2018.

== Second generation ==
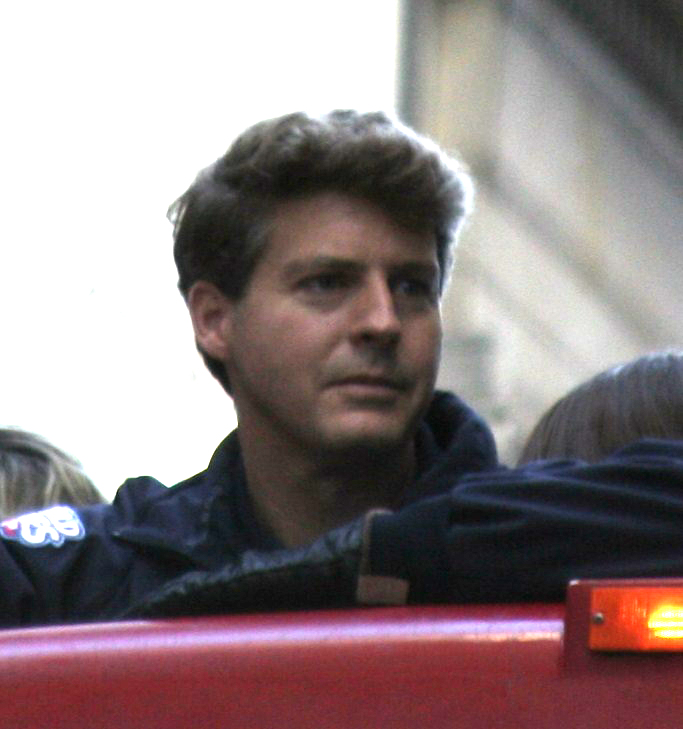
Hal Steinbrenner in 2009

George and Joan had four children: Hank, Jessica, Jennifer, Hal. All four have served as general partners for the Yankees.

Hank was the oldest of the four children. He was co-chairman of the Yankees and died in 2020. Hal is the youngest of the four. He is chairman and CEO of Steinbrenner Hotel Properties. Hal became chairman of the Yankees in 2008, succeeding his father.

Jessica runs Kinsman Farm, a stud farm, in Ocala, Florida. She has also authored children's books. Jessica has been married and divorced three times. Her second marriage was to Joe Molloy, who served as managing general partner of the Yankees in 1992, while George was banned from baseball. Her third husband, Felix Lopez, served as a vice president for the Yankees.

Jennifer majored in business and was a Morehead Scholar at the University of North Carolina, before serving in the Yankees Public Affairs Department in 1984-85 and spending 23 years actively participating in the philanthropic community. However, George did not let her rise in the Yankees organization, saying "I've always been a chauvinist."

Jennifer married Steve Swindal, who became a general partner in the Yankees and was named George's heir as chairman of the Yankees in 2005. They divorced in 2007, and the Steinbrenner family purchased Swindal's financial interests in the franchise. Jennifer is on the board of directors of Mary Lee's House, St. Joseph's Children's Hospital Foundation, Boys & Girls Club of Tampa Bay and the Gold Shield Foundation, which was established in 1981 by her father, George M. Steinbrenner III.

== Third generation ==
George and Joan Steinbrenner had 14 grandchildren.

Stephen Swindal Jr. works in baseball operations for the Yankees.

Haley Swindal is a Tony-nominated Broadway producer, singer, and actress. She has performed in Broadway shows, including Chicago, where she has frequently starred as Mama Morton on Broadway since 2019. Haley is the Ambassador of Community Relations for the New York Yankees, contributing to the planning and executing of the Yankees community programming and serving as a forward-facing representative of the Steinbrenner family in New York.

Robert Molloy, son of Jessica, works in operations for the Yankees, and produces movies with his company Pinstripe Productions.

George Michael Steinbrenner IV, the son of Hank, formed an IndyCar racing team in conjunction with Andretti Autosport in 2017 called Steinbrenner Racing. The team competed in the 2017 Indy Lights. In 2018, he partnered with Mike Harding to form Harding Steinbrenner Racing, competing in the 2019 IndyCar Series. In 2022, George's sister Julia stepped into a leadership role with the team.

According to Jennifer, the family wants to own the team for "eternity". Hal said the family had begun discussing future plans for the family's involvement in the franchise, and that several of George's grandchildren, including Stephen Swindal Jr, Robert Molloy, George Michael Steinbrenner IV, Julia Steinbrenner (George IV's sister), and Katherine Steinbrenner (Hal's daughter), have expressed interest in running the Yankees.
