= George Steinbrenner =

American businessman (1930–2010)

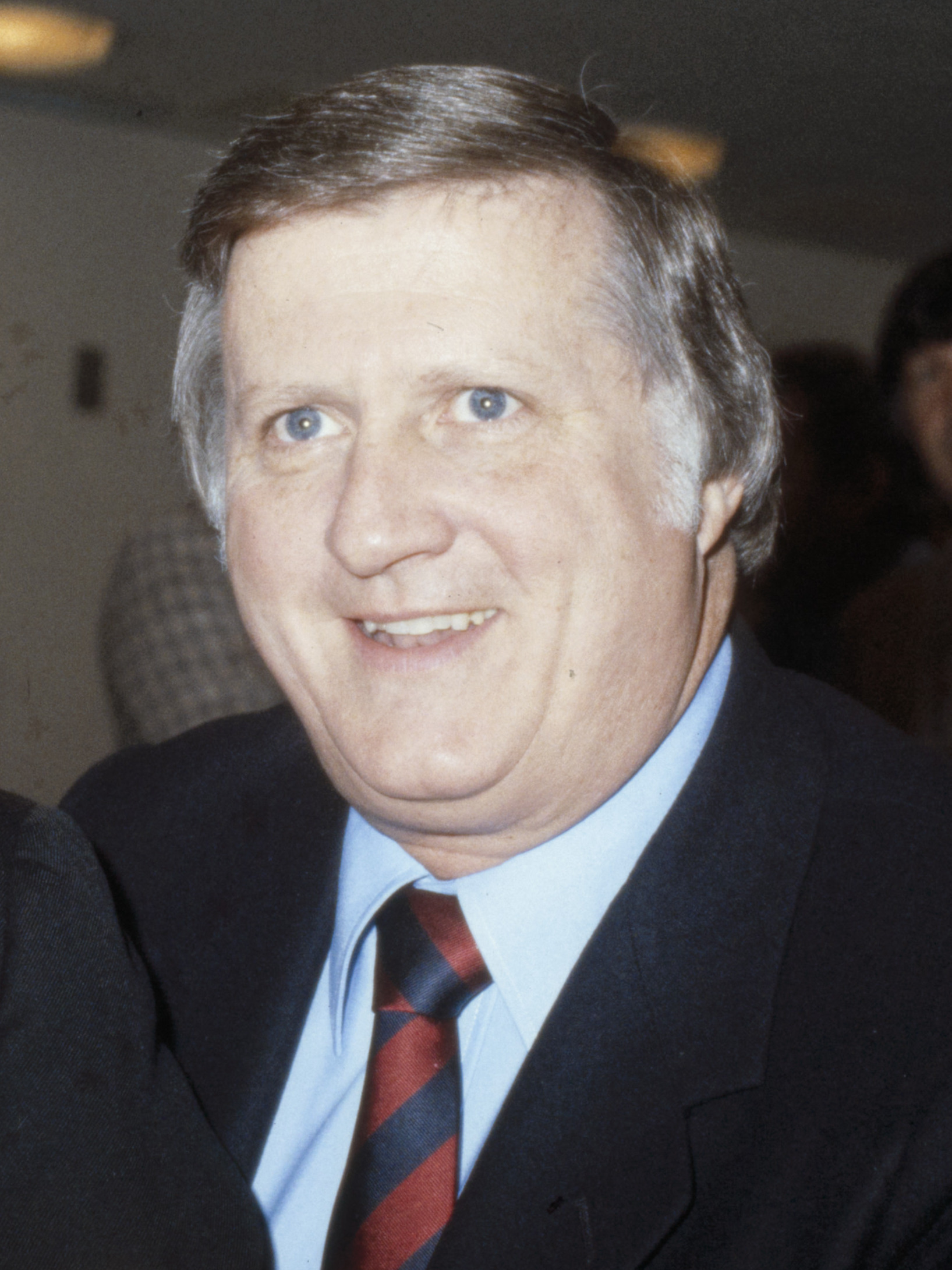
- Steinbrenner in 1980
- Born: George Michael Steinbrenner III; July 4, 1930; Rocky River, Ohio, U.S.
- Died: July 13, 2010 (aged 80); Tampa, Florida, U.S.
- Education: Williams College (BA); Ohio State University (MS)
- Occupations: Businessman; entrepreneur; investor
- Known for: Owner of New York Yankees (MLB)
- Political party: Republican
- Spouse: Elizabeth Joan Zieg (m. 1956)
- Children: 4, including Hank and Hal
- Family: Steinbrenner
- Military career
- Allegiance: United States
- Branch: United States Air Force
- Service years: 1952–1954
- Rank: First lieutenant
- Unit: Strategic Air Command

George Michael Steinbrenner III (July 4, 1930 – July 13, 2010), nicknamed "the Boss", was an American businessman who was the principal owner and managing partner of Major League Baseball's New York Yankees from 1973 until his death in 2010. He was the longest-serving owner in club history, and the Yankees won seven World Series championships and 11 American League pennants under his ownership. His outspokenness and role in driving up player salaries made him one of the sport's most controversial figures. Steinbrenner was also involved in the Great Lakes and Gulf Coast shipping industry.

Originally known as a very hands-on owner, Steinbrenner earned the nickname "the Boss". He had a tendency to meddle in daily on-field decisions, and to hire and fire (and sometimes re-hire) managers. Former Yankees manager Dallas Green gave him the derisive nickname "Manager George". However, from the early 1990s onward, he mostly left the Yankees in the hands of the baseball operations staff and rarely interfered. He officially retired from day-to-day control of the team in 2008.

He died after suffering a heart attack in his Tampa home on the morning of July 13, 2010, the day of the 81st All-Star Game. The Yankees are now owned by Yankee Global Enterprises, for which Steinbrenner's four children have served as general partners.

== Early life and education ==
Steinbrenner was born in Rocky River, Ohio, the only son of Rita (née Haley) and Henry George Steinbrenner II. His mother was an Irish immigrant who had changed her name from O'Haley to Haley. His father was of German descent and was a world-class track and field hurdler while at Massachusetts Institute of Technology, from which he graduated in engineering in 1927, first in his class and a distinguished scholar in naval architecture. The elder Steinbrenner later became a wealthy shipping magnate who ran the family firm operating freight ships hauling ore and grain on the Great Lakes, inherited from his great-grandmother Sophia Steinbrenner and her mother Anna Minch. George III was named after his paternal grandfather, George Michael Steinbrenner II. Steinbrenner had two younger sisters, Susan and Judy. At age nine, the elder Steinbrenner staked George to a couple of hundred chickens, and he peddled hens and their eggs door to door. "I learned a lot about business from raising chickens," he told Sports Illustrated. "Half of my customers began buying because they were afraid of me."

In 1944, Steinbrenner entered Culver Military Academy in Northern Indiana, graduating in 1948. He received his B.A. from Williams College in 1952. While at Williams, George was an average student who led an active extracurricular life. He was a member of Delta Kappa Epsilon fraternity. He was an accomplished hurdler on the varsity track and field team, and served as sports editor of The Williams Record, played piano in the band, and played halfback on the football team in his senior year. He joined the United States Air Force after graduation, was commissioned a second lieutenant and was stationed at Lockbourne Air Force Base in Columbus, Ohio. Following honorable discharge in 1954, he did post-graduate study at Ohio State University (1954–55), earning his master's degree in physical education.

He met his wife-to-be, Elizabeth Joan Zieg, in Columbus, and married her on May 12, 1956. The couple had two sons, Hank and Hal, and two daughters, Jessica Steinbrenner and Jennifer Steinbrenner-Swindal. The Steinbrenners also have numerous grandchildren. All four of the Steinbrenners' children eventually got divorced, some multiple times, resulting in several former-in-laws being removed from the Yankees' management.

== Pre-Yankees career ==
While studying at Ohio State, he served as a graduate assistant to Buckeye football coach Woody Hayes. The Buckeyes were undefeated national champions that year, and won the Rose Bowl. Steinbrenner served as an assistant football coach at Northwestern University in 1955, and at Purdue University from 1956 to 1957.

Steinbrenner joined Kinsman Marine Transit Company in 1957, the Great Lakes shipping company that his great-grandfather Henry had purchased in 1901 from The Minch Transit Company, which was owned by a family relation, and renamed. Steinbrenner worked hard to successfully revitalize the company, which was suffering hardship during difficult market conditions. In its return to profitability, Kinsman emphasized grain shipments over ore. A few years later, with the help of a loan from a New York bank, Steinbrenner purchased the company from his family. He later became part of a group that purchased the American Shipbuilding Company, and, in 1967, he became its chairman and chief executive officer. By 1972, the company's gross sales were more than $100 million annually.

In 1960, against his father's wishes, Steinbrenner entered the sports franchise business for the first time with basketball's Cleveland Pipers, of the National Industrial Basketball League (NIBL). Steinbrenner had hired John McClendon, who became the first African American coach in professional basketball and persuaded Jerry Lucas to join his team instead of the rival National Basketball Association. The Pipers switched leagues, to the new professional ABL in 1961; the new circuit was founded by Abe Saperstein, owner of the Harlem Globetrotters. The league and its teams experienced financial problems, and McClendon resigned in protest halfway through the season. However, the Pipers had won the first half of a split season. Steinbrenner replaced McClendon with former Boston Celtics star Bill Sharman, and the Pipers won the ABL championship in 1961–62. The ABL folded in December 1962, just months into its second season. Steinbrenner and his partners lost significant money on the venture, but Steinbrenner paid off all of his creditors and partners over the next few years.

With his burgeoning sports aspirations put on hold, Steinbrenner turned his attention to the theatre. His involvement with Broadway began with a short-lived 1967 play, The Ninety Day Mistress, in which he partnered with another rookie producer, James M. Nederlander. Whereas Nederlander threw himself into his family's business full-time, Steinbrenner invested in a mere half-dozen shows, including the 1974 Tony Award nominee for Best Musical, Seesaw, and the 1988 Peter Allen flop, Legs Diamond.

== New York Yankees career ==
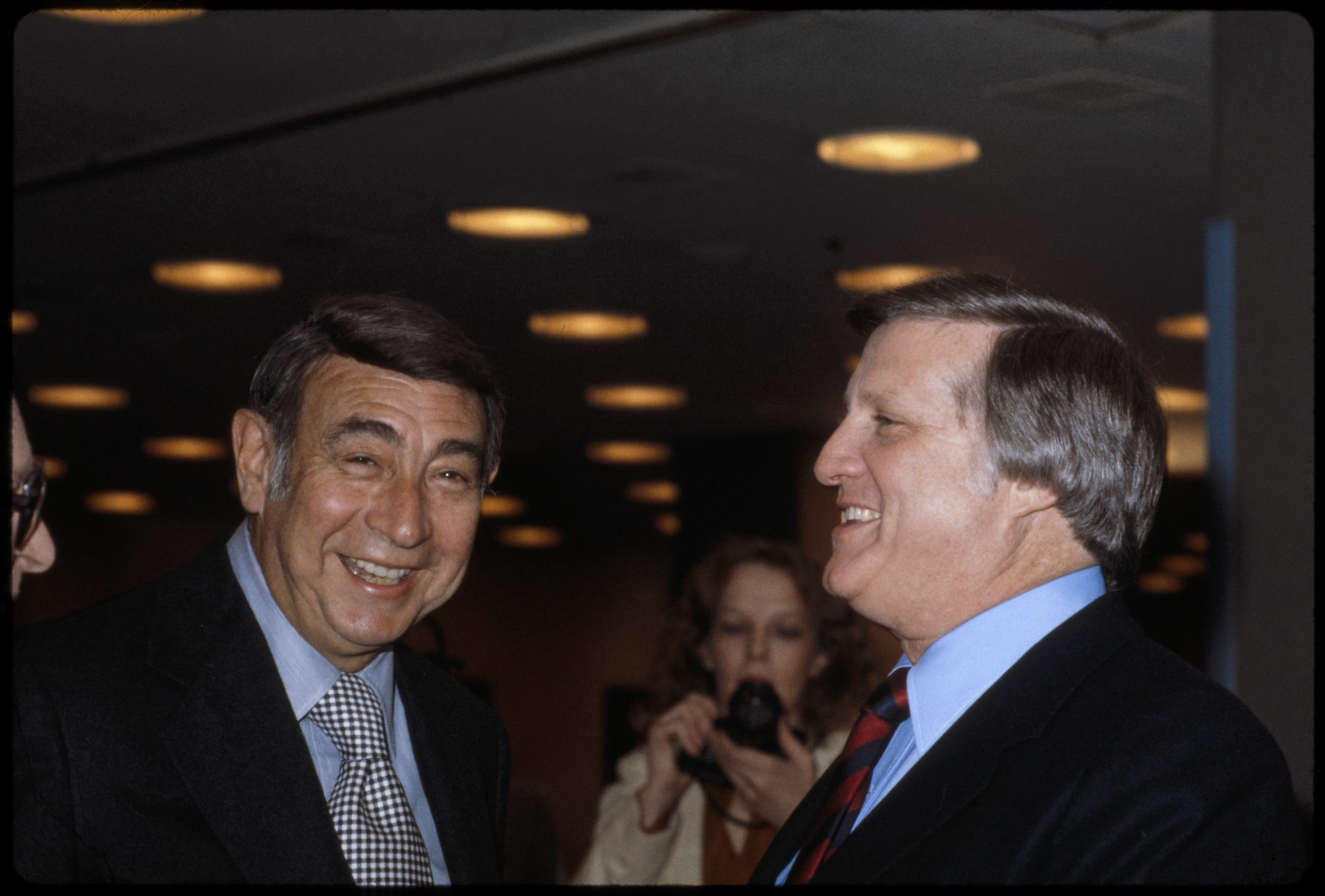
Steinbrenner with Howard Cosell, 1980

Steinbrenner was part of an investment group led by Arthur M. Wirtz that purchased the Chicago Bulls on 25 July 1972 and sold controlling interest in the franchise to Jerry Reinsdorf on 8 February 1985. Among his fellow Bulls investors was Lester Crown and Cleveland-based businessmen Edward Ginsberg and Sheldon Guren, all four of whom would venture into purchasing a Major League Baseball (MLB) team just over five months later.

The Yankees had been struggling during their years under CBS ownership, which had acquired the team in 1965. In 1972, CBS chairman William S. Paley told team president E. Michael Burke the media company intended to sell the club. As Burke later told writer Roger Kahn, Paley offered to sell the franchise to Burke if he could find financial backing. Steinbrenner, who had participated in a failed attempt to buy the Cleveland Indians from Vernon Stouffer one year earlier, and who had been an investor in Buffalo's failed 1969 Major League Baseball expansion bid, was brought together with Burke by veteran baseball executive Gabe Paul.

On January 3, 1973, Steinbrenner and minority partner Burke led a group of investors which also included Nederlander, Crown, Ginsberg, Guren, John DeLorean, Nelson Bunker Hunt, and Marvin L. Warner in purchasing the Yankees from CBS. For years, the selling price was reported to be $10 million. However, Steinbrenner later revealed that the deal included two parking garages that CBS had bought from the city, and soon after the deal closed, CBS bought back the garages for $1.2 million. The net cost to the group for the Yankees was, therefore, $8.8 million.

The announced intention was that Burke would continue to run the team as club president. But Burke later became angry when he found out that Paul had been brought in as a senior Yankee executive, reducing his authority, and quit the team presidency in April 1973. (Burke remained a minority owner of the club into the following decade, but as fellow minority owner John McMullen stated, "There is nothing in life quite so limited as being a limited partner of George Steinbrenner.") Paul was officially named president of the club on April 19. It would be the first of many high-profile departures with employees who crossed paths with "The Boss". At the conclusion of the 1973 season, two more prominent names departed: manager Ralph Houk, who resigned and took a similar position with the Detroit Tigers; and general manager Lee MacPhail, who became president of the American League.

The 1973 off-season would continue to be controversial when Steinbrenner and Paul fought to hire former Oakland Athletics manager Dick Williams, who had resigned immediately after leading the team to its second straight World Series title. However, because Williams was still under contract to Oakland, the subsequent legal wrangling prevented the Yankees from hiring him. On the first anniversary of the team's ownership change, the Yankees hired former Pittsburgh Pirates manager Bill Virdon to lead the team on the field.

There is nothing in life quite so limited as being a limited partner of George Steinbrenner.

— Yankees minority owner John McMullen

During the 1981 World Series, Steinbrenner provided a colorful backdrop to the Yankees' loss of the series. After a Game 3 loss in Los Angeles, Steinbrenner called a press conference in his hotel room, showing off his left hand in a cast and various other injuries that he claimed were earned in a fight with two Dodgers fans in the hotel elevator. Nobody came forward about the fight, leading to the belief that he had made up the story of the fight to light a fire under the Yankees. After the series, he issued a public apology to the City of New York for his team's performance, while at the same time assuring the fans that plans to put the team together for 1982 would begin immediately. He was criticized by players and press alike for doing so, as many felt losing in the World Series was not something requiring an apology.

=== Facial hair policy ===
Steinbrenner enforced a military-style grooming code: All players, coaches, and male executives were forbidden to display any facial hair other than mustaches (except for religious reasons), and scalp hair could not be grown below the collar. (Long sideburns and "mutton chops" were not specifically banned.) The policy led to some unusual and comical incidents.

The first such occurrence happened when the Yankees were standing at attention with caps removed for the National Anthem prior to the ballclub's home opener against the Cleveland Indians. In the owner's box next to the New York dugout, Steinbrenner noticed that several players' hair was too long for his standards. Not yet aware of the players' names, he wrote down the uniform numbers of the offenders which included Thurman Munson, Bobby Murcer, and Sparky Lyle and had the list with the demand that their hair be trimmed immediately delivered to Houk who reluctantly relayed the order to the players after the game.

In 1983, at Steinbrenner's behest, Yankee coach Yogi Berra ordered Goose Gossage to remove a beard he was growing. Gossage responded by shaving away the beard but leaving a thick exaggerated mustache extending down the upper lip to the jaw line, a look Gossage still sports to this day.

The most infamous incident involving facial hair occurred in 1991. Although Steinbrenner was suspended, Yankees management ordered Don Mattingly, who was then sporting a mullet-like hairstyle, to get a haircut. When Mattingly refused, he was benched. This led to a huge media frenzy with reporters and talk radio repeatedly mocking the team. The WPIX broadcasting crew of Phil Rizzuto, Bobby Murcer, and Tom Seaver lampooned the policy on a pregame show with Rizzuto playing the role of a barber sent to enforce the rule. Mattingly would eventually be reinstated. Coincidentally, The Simpsons episode "Homer at the Bat", which was filmed earlier that year, included Mattingly as a guest star who is suspended from play by Mr. Burns for his sideburns being too long, despite shaving the area of his head above where sideburns grow. In 1995, Mattingly again ran afoul of the policy when he grew a goatee.

In 2005, after signing with the Yankees, former Boston Red Sox center fielder Johnny Damon, who was known for his long beard and shoulder-length hair during his time with the Red Sox, said about the policy: "Without a doubt, George Steinbrenner has a policy and I'm going to stick to it. Our policy with the Yankees is to go out there and win and we're going to try and bring another championship to them." Steinbrenner later noted, "He looks like a Yankee, he sounds like a Yankee and he is a Yankee." Damon claimed he was already planning on cutting his hair after the 2005 season.

=== Criticism of Dave Winfield ===
After the 1980 season, Steinbrenner made headlines by signing Dave Winfield to a 10-year, $23 million contract, making Winfield baseball's highest-paid player. In 1985, Steinbrenner derided Winfield's poor performance in a key September series against the Toronto Blue Jays:

Where is Reggie Jackson? We need a Mr. October or a Mr. September. Winfield is Mr. May. My big guys are not coming through. The guys who are supposed to carry the team are not carrying the team. They aren't producing. If I don't get big performances out of Winfield, Griffey and Baylor, we can't win.

— Steinbrenner to New York Times sportswriter Murray Chass.

This criticism eventually became somewhat of an anachronism, as many believed Steinbrenner made the statement following the 1981 World Series. Part of that comment later led Ken Griffey Jr. to list the Yankees as one team for which he would never play.

In 2001, Winfield cited Steinbrenner's animosity as a factor in his decision to enter the Hall of Fame as a representative of his first team, the San Diego Padres, rather than the team that increased his national recognition, the Yankees.

=== Reinstatement and championship years ===
Steinbrenner was reinstated in 1993. Unlike past years, he was somewhat less inclined to interfere in the Yankees' baseball operations. He left day-to-day baseball matters in the hands of Gene Michael and other executives and allowed promising farm-system players such as Bernie Williams to develop instead of trading them for established players. Steinbrenner's having "got religion" (in the words of New York Daily News reporter Bill Madden) paid off. After contending only briefly two years earlier, the 1993 Yankees were in the American League East race with the eventual champion Toronto Blue Jays until September.

The 1994 Yankees were the American League East leaders when a players' strike wiped out the rest of the season. Coincidentally, a players' strike had aided their 1981 playoff effort.

In 1995 the team returned to the playoffs for the first time since 1981. However, Steinbrenner elected to fire manager Buck Showalter after the series ended in a decisive Game 5 loss to the Seattle Mariners. He also fired Michael from the GM spot after the season ended. Three days after firing Showalter on October 31, rankled by the angry responses by fans, he attempted to woo him back (while presumably moving Joe Torre to a desk job rather than the manager position). Showalter elected to honor the word he gave to the Arizona Diamondbacks and thus Steinbrenner went with Torre to manage the team. In 1996, the Yankees beat the Atlanta Braves in six games to win the World Series. They went on to Series wins in 1998, 1999, and 2000, and fell short of a fourth straight title in 2001 with a seventh-game loss to the Arizona Diamondbacks.

The Yankees then made the playoffs every season through 2007. In 2003, they beat the Boston Red Sox to win the AL pennant, but lost the World Series to the Florida Marlins, denying Steinbrenner—who had won the Stanley Cup in June of that year as part-owner of the New Jersey Devils—the distinction of winning championships in two major sports leagues in the same year.

In 2008, the Yankees ended their postseason run with a third-place finish in the American League East. However, in 2009, the Yankees defeated the Philadelphia Phillies in the World Series to win a 27th championship, seven of which had been won under Steinbrenner's ownership.

== Retirement ==
Steinbrenner named Steve Swindal, his son-in-law, to be his successor in June 2005. When Swindal and Jennifer Steinbrenner divorced in 2007, the Yankees bought Swindal out of his financial stake in the team, with Hal Steinbrenner succeeding Swindal as chairman of Yankee Global Enterprises.

From 2006 to his death, Steinbrenner spent most of his time in Tampa, Florida. After the 2007 season and the decision not to bring back manager Joe Torre, Steinbrenner was in poor enough health that he officially retired and handed control of the Yankees to his sons Hal and Hank Steinbrenner. The transition was formally completed in 2008.

After ceding day-to-day control of the team, Steinbrenner made few public appearances and gave no interviews. Associates and family members refused to comment on rampant speculation concerning his declining health, specifically rumors that he was suffering from Alzheimer's disease. A 2007 interviewer said: "He doesn't look all right. In fact, he looks dreadful. His body is bloated; his jawline has slackened into a triple chin; his skin looks as if a dry-cleaner bag has been stretched over it. Steinbrenner's face, pale and swollen, has a curiously undefined look. His features seem frozen in a permanent rictus of careworn disbelief." The Yankees went to great lengths to prevent anyone outside Steinbrenner's immediate family and closest business associates from speaking to him, or even getting a glimpse of him on the rare occasions when he made an appearance at Yankee Stadium. Temporary curtains were set up to block views of his entry and exit routes, and no one was allowed near the vehicles transporting him. The press elevator carrying media members downstairs to the interview areas was shut down before he arrived, and again toward the end of the game while he departed.

Steinbrenner made a rare appearance in the Bronx on the field for the 79th All-Star Game on July 15, 2008. Wearing dark glasses, he walked slowly into the stadium's media entrance with the aid of several companions, leaning upon one of them for support. He later was driven out on to the field along with his son Hal at the end of the lengthy pre-game ceremony in which the All-Stars were introduced at their fielding positions along with 49 of the 63 living Hall of Famers.

In subsequent occasional visits to spring training, regular-season games, and other outings, he used a wheelchair.

On April 13, 2010, Derek Jeter and Joe Girardi privately presented the first 2009 World Series Championship ring to Steinbrenner in his stadium suite. He was "almost speechless", according to reports.

Steinbrenner's estimated net worth was $1.15 billion in 2009 according to the Forbes 400 List in Forbes magazine issued in September 2009. He was the first owner of a baseball team to sell cable TV rights (to MSG Network).

== Death ==
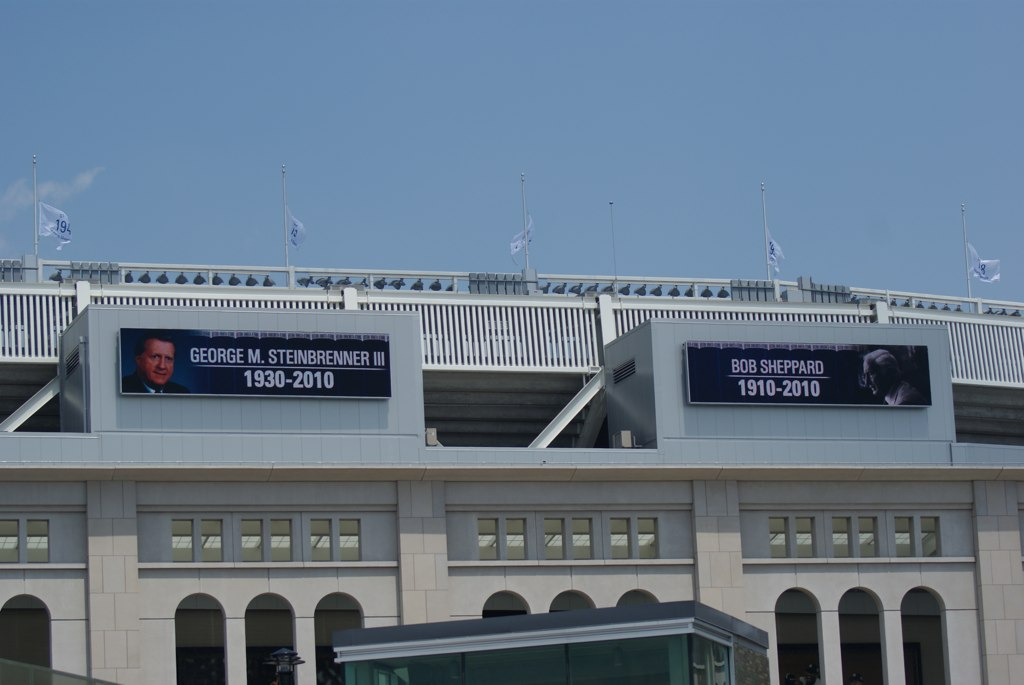
Steinbrenner and Bob Sheppard memorialized on the facade of Yankee Stadium

On July 13, 2010, the morning of the 2010 Major League Baseball All-Star Game, Steinbrenner died of a heart attack at St. Joseph's Hospital in Tampa, Florida. On July 14, the Yankees announced that players and coaches would wear a Steinbrenner commemorative patch on the left breast of their home and road uniforms, and commemorative patch on the left arm in memory of former public address announcer Bob Sheppard. July 15 marked the Yankees' first home game at Yankee Stadium after both the All-Star break and Steinbrenner's passing. Prior to the game, the team presented a mural above the right-center field bleachers in the late owner's honor while closer Mariano Rivera laid a bouquet of flowers on home plate. The Steinbrenner family added a monument to Monument Park on September 20, 2010, to honor Steinbrenner. He is buried at Trinity Memorial Gardens in Trinity, Florida.

== Off the field ==
In addition to being an intense boss to his on-field employees, Steinbrenner was also known for pressuring and changing off-field employees (including various publicity directors), sometimes chewing them out in public. Longtime Cardinals announcer Jack Buck once said that he had seen Steinbrenner's yacht and that, "It was a beautiful thing to observe, with all 36 oars working in unison." Former sportscaster Hank Greenwald, who called Yankee games on WABC radio for two years, once said he knew when Steinbrenner was in town by how tense the office staff was.

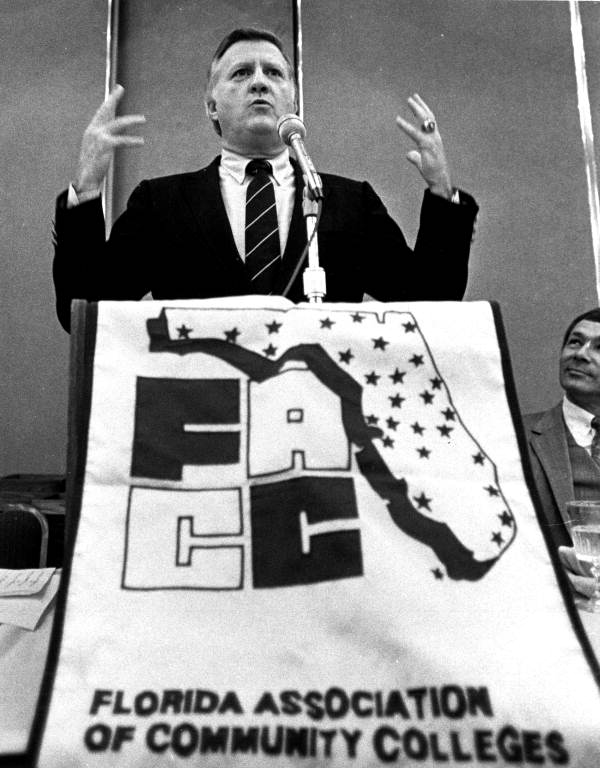
Steinbrenner speaking at a convention in 1984

Steinbrenner usually kept his complaints about the team broadcasters he approved of (except for the YES Network crew, who have generally not been his direct employees) out of the newspapers. However, he was known to be upset with the sometimes blunt commentary of former broadcaster Jim Kaat and former analyst Tony Kubek.

The 1986 World Series was called "Steinbrenner's nightmare", because it was a showdown between two of the Yankees' biggest rivals, their cross-town rival the New York Mets and their most hated rival, the Boston Red Sox. As a result, Steinbrenner wrote articles in the New York Post on the World Series. The Mets won that World Series, which relieved many Yankee fans. In addition, Yankees fans attended the parade saying that "anyone who beats Boston is worth coming down for."

Steinbrenner had a reputation as a domineering boss. Only three Yankee employees were continuously employed from the start of Steinbrenner's ownership in 1973 until the end of his tenure. One of those is long time Head Athletic Trainer Gene Monahan, who in 2010 missed his first spring training in 48 years after being diagnosed with cancer.

Harvey Greene, the Yankees' Director of Media Relations from 1986 to 1989, talked about the experience of working under Steinbrenner:

When the team was on the road, you'd come back to your hotel late at night, and if your phone light was on, you knew that either there had been a death in the family or George was looking for you. After a while, you started to hope that there had been a death in the family.

Steinbrenner was involved with thoroughbred horse racing from the early 1970s. He owned Kinsman Stud Farm in Ocala, Florida and raced under the name Kinsman Stable.

=== Charitable work ===
Steinbrenner gave to many charitable causes. In 1982, George, "while attending the funeral of a police officer killed in the line of duty, was deeply moved by the ceremony in which the American flag was folded military-style and presented to the officer's surviving spouse and young children". "He was concerned about their education and who would help with the cost, so he established the Silver Shield Foundation," said Foundation's Co-founder James E. Fuchs, a close friend of Mr. Steinbrenner's. He often donated to the families of fallen police officers in the Tampa Police Department and the New York City Police Department in addition to college scholarships for many poor children.

During the 1992 Summer Olympics in Barcelona, Spain, Steinbrenner comforted United States Olympic Swimming medalist Ron Karnaugh through his father's death and maintained a relationship with him until his death. At his residence in Tampa, Steinbrenner supported numerous individuals and charities including the Boys and Girls Club as well as the Salvation Army. Mel Stottlemyre recalled that during his myeloma cancer treatment at Memorial Sloan-Kettering Hospital he had mentioned in passing to Steinbrenner how he regretted not being able to watch Yankee games from his room. Stottlemyre heard that Steinbrenner went all the way to Mayor Rudy Giuliani to ensure he was able to watch the broadcasts from his room. Steinbrenner had also donated $1 million to St. Joseph's Children's Hospital where a wing was named in his honor.

=== Politics ===
Although Steinbrenner was a registered Republican, he donated money to numerous Democratic senators and representatives, including $6,300 to Chuck Schumer, $9,600 to Charles Rangel, $1,000 to Peter W. Rodino, and $750 to George J. Mitchell. Steinbrenner generally voted Republican at the presidential level, having supported George H. W. Bush in the 1988 and 1992 elections, as well as George W. Bush in 2000 (and donating $5,000 to the Bush-Cheney Florida recount fund). However, in 2008, Steinbrenner's presidential donations crossed party lines, as he donated to Democratic candidate Hillary Clinton along with Republican candidates Rudy Giuliani and John McCain, contributing $2,300 to Clinton's campaign, $4,600 to Giuliani's campaign, and $15,000 to McCain Victory 2008. In 1989, after seeing Donald Trump on The Morton Downey Jr. Show, he wrote a letter to Trump suggesting he should run for president.

== Controversies ==
=== Management style ===
Early on, Steinbrenner became infamous in Cleveland circles for berating anyone who dared cross him. This style followed him to the Yankees; he quickly became infamous for overseeing rapid turnover of management personnel. In his first 23 seasons, he changed managers 20 times; Billy Martin alone was fired and rehired five times (although the first firing was technically a resignation, albeit with Steinbrenner forcing Martin's hand). During his first 26 years with the club, he went through 13 public relations directors. "The first time George fires you, it's very traumatic," oft-fired Yankees flack Harvey Greene said. "The three or four times after that, it's like, Great! I've got the rest of the day off." Greene, the Yankees' PR director was fired by Steinbrenner, however the next day Steinbrenner's assistant called Greene and asked why he wasn't at work. After arriving at work late, Steinbrenner told Greene "If you're late again, you're fired."

Steinbrenner employed 11 general managers over 30 years. He was equally famous for pursuing high-priced free agents (i.e., Catfish Hunter, Reggie Jackson, and Dave Winfield) and then feuding with them. In July 1978, Billy Martin famously said of Steinbrenner and his $3 million outfielder Reggie Jackson, "The two were meant for each other. One's a born liar, and the other's convicted." The comment resulted in Martin's first departure, though officially he resigned (tearfully), before Yankees President Al Rosen could carry out Steinbrenner's dictum to fire him.

David Wells recalled he and Steinbrenner almost got into a fight during a heated argument. Wells later apologized to Steinbrenner for threatening to fight him.

=== Illegal campaign contributions to Nixon ===
The "convicted" part of Billy Martin's famous 1978 "liar and convicted" comment referred to Steinbrenner's connection to Richard Nixon; in 1974, Steinbrenner pleaded guilty to making illegal contributions to Nixon's re-election campaign, and to a felony charge of obstruction of justice. Faced with a cost overrun problem with the United States Commerce Department, Steinbrenner gave six of his American Shipbuilding employees "special bonuses" of $25,000 and directed them to then turn around and personally donate the funds to Nixon's Committee for the Re-Election of the President (CRP).

Steinbrenner originally said he would fight the charges in court, but in August 1974, two weeks after Nixon resigned, Steinbrenner pleaded guilty to two charges in the case. He was personally fined $15,000 and his company American Shipbuilding was assessed an additional $20,000. On November 27 of that year, MLB Commissioner Bowie Kuhn suspended him for two years, but later commuted it to fifteen months. Ronald Reagan pardoned Steinbrenner in January 1989, one of the final acts of his presidency.

=== Ban from management and reinstatement ===
On July 30, 1990, Steinbrenner was banned permanently from day-to-day management (but not ownership) of the Yankees by MLB Commissioner Fay Vincent for paying a gambler named Howard Spira $40,000 to dig up "dirt" on Winfield. Winfield had sued the Yankees for failing to contribute $300,000 to his foundation, a guaranteed stipulation in his contract. Vincent proposed a two-year suspension, but Steinbrenner wanted to have it worded as an "agreement" that had him leave baseball rather than a suspension in order to protect his reputation with the U.S. Olympic Committee (he also cited a reason of wanting to see his son take over). After considerable negotiation with Vincent's office, Robert Nederlander, one of Steinbrenner's theatre partners and a limited partner in the Yankees organization, became the managing general partner. After Nederlander resigned in 1992, he was succeeded by Joe Molloy, George's son-in-law. A year later, Steinbrenner asked to be reinstated (having been convinced by owners such as Jerry Reinsdorf that he had made a terrible mistake). Vincent agreed to reinstate him on the condition that he would drop some lawsuits he had others file against Vincent. However, Vincent was forced to resign from his job as commissioner not long after, and Steinbrenner would be reinstated by Vincent's successor, Bud Selig.

== In the media ==
Steinbrenner poked fun at himself in the media. His frequent firings and rehirings of manager Billy Martin were lampooned in a '70s Miller Lite beer commercial in which Steinbrenner tells Martin "You're fired!" to which Martin replies "Oh, no, not again!" After one of Martin's real-life rehirings, the commercial was resurrected, only with Steinbrenner's line redubbed to say "You're hired!" The two commercials would sometimes alternate depending on Martin's status with the team. In The Simpsons episode "Homer at the Bat", Mr. Burns fires Don Mattingly for refusing to shave sideburns only Burns could see. It is often assumed that this was a parody of an argument Steinbrenner and Mattingly had in real life regarding Mattingly's hair length. However, the episode was actually recorded a year before the suspension occurred, and was nothing more than a coincidence. As Mattingly walks off the baseball field, he states, "I still like him [Burns] better than Steinbrenner."

New York Daily News cartoonist Bill Gallo often cited Steinbrenner's German heritage by drawing him in a Prussian military uniform, complete with spiked helmet, gold epaulettes and medals, calling him "General von Steingrabber".

=== Seinfeld caricature ===
George Steinbrenner appeared as a character in the situation comedy Seinfeld, when George Costanza worked for the Yankees for several seasons. Mitch Mitchell and Lee Bear portrayed the character, and Larry David provided voice-over performances whenever the character spoke. Steinbrenner's full face was never shown, and the character was almost always viewed from the back in scenes set in his office at Yankee Stadium. The character appeared in the episodes "The Opposite", "The Secretary", "The Race", "The Jimmy", "The Wink", "The Hot Tub", "The Caddy", "The Calzone", "The Bottle Deposit", "The Nap", "The Millennium", "The Muffin Tops", and "The Finale".

The fictional Steinbrenner talks nonstop, regardless of whether anyone is listening, and sometimes refers to himself as "Big Stein". In "The Wink", Steinbrenner mentions all of the people he fired, saying Billy Martin four times, and mentions then-current manager Buck Showalter, but then quickly swears Costanza to silence. Though intended as a joke, two weeks after the episode aired the Yankees announced that they had parted ways with Showalter.

Steinbrenner's involvement with Seinfeld began when he refused a request to make a cameo appearance and permit a Yankees pennant to appear; the show nonetheless used the pennant. A year later, Steinbrenner was asked to permit a Yankees uniform to appear on the sixth-season episode, "The Chaperone". The owner was still angry about the unauthorized pennant, and knew so little about the show that after reading the script he believed George Costanza had been named after him as an insult. He refused to permit the uniform's use unless the character was renamed. After watching the show and enjoying both it and the Costanza character, however, Steinbrenner approved the uniform, and later said he felt the show's portrayal of him was unflattering but essentially accurate to how he was at the time.

Jerry Seinfeld said after Steinbrenner's death: "Who else could be a memorable character on a television show without actually appearing on the show? You felt George even though he wasn't there. That's how huge a force of personality he was."

== Awards and honors ==
- Seven-time World Series champion as owner of the New York Yankees (1977, 1978, 1996, 1998–2000, 2009)
- Two-time Stanley Cup champion as owner of the New Jersey Devils (2000, 2003)
- Three-time Outstanding Team ESPY Award winner as owner of the Yankees (1997, 1999, 2001)
- TDC Lifetime Achievement Award (1998)
- The Flying Wedge Award
- 1992 Tampa Metro Civitan Club's Outstanding Citizen of the Year Award.
- Steinbrenner Band Hall at the University of Florida named in his honor
- George M. Steinbrenner High School in Lutz, Florida named in his honor. Steinbrenner was a generous contributor to the Tampa Bay area.
- Yankees spring training field named George M. Steinbrenner Field in March 2008 in his honor
- The entrance to the new Bryson Field at Boshamer Stadium at the University of North Carolina at Chapel Hill named for Steinbrenner and his family.
- A life-size bronze statue of Steinbrenner was placed in front of the stadium in January 2011.
- Golden Plate Award of the American Academy of Achievement in 1969

== See also ==
- List of New York Yankees owners and executives
- List of people pardoned or granted clemency by the president of the United States
- List of University of Florida Athletic Hall of Fame members
- Steinbrenner family
- Steinbrenner High School

Sporting positions
Preceded by CBS	Owner of the New York Yankees; 1973–2010	Succeeded by Hal Steinbrenner; Hank Steinbrenner
Preceded by Alan N. Cohen; Joseph Taub	New Jersey Nets principal owner 1998–2004	Succeeded by Bruce Ratner
