= Hal Steinbrenner =

American professional baseball team owner and executive (born 1969)

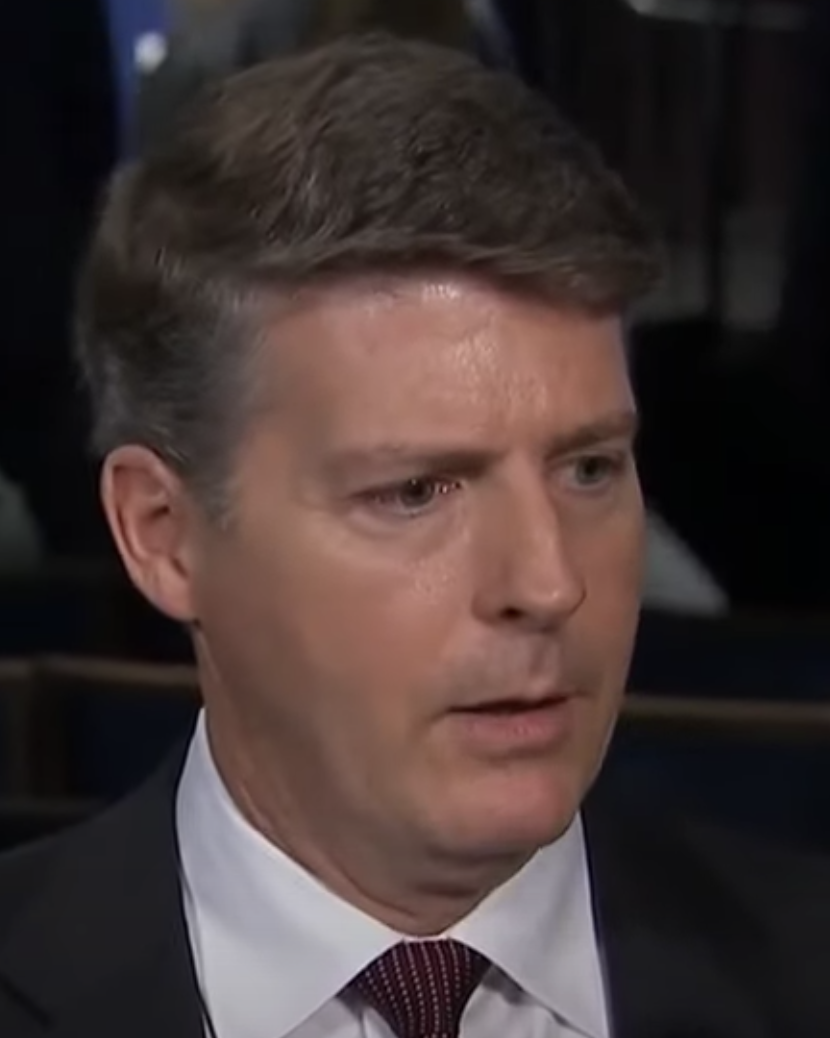
- Steinbrenner in 2019
- Born: Harold Zieg Steinbrenner; December 3, 1969 (age 56); Culver, Indiana, U.S.
- Education: Williams College (BA); University of Florida (MBA)
- Occupations: Owner of New York Yankees/ Managing general partner; Minority owner of New York City Football Club & AC Milan
- Spouses: Christina Lavery (m. 1995; div. 2007); Cristina DiTullio (m. 2009)
- Children: 1
- Parent(s): George Steinbrenner; Joan Steinbrenner
- Family: Hank Steinbrenner (brother)

Harold Zieg Steinbrenner (born December 3, 1969) is an American businessman best known as the chairman and managing general partner of Yankee Global Enterprises (YGE), which owns the New York Yankees of Major League Baseball (MLB). In addition to owning the Yankees, YGE also has a 20% minority stake in the American soccer club New York City Football Club of Major League Soccer (MLS), and a 10% minority stake in Italian soccer club AC Milan of Serie A. He and his siblings inherited control of the team from their father, George Steinbrenner, who died in 2010.

== Biography ==
=== Family and education ===
Hal Steinbrenner is the younger son of George (1930–2010) and Elizabeth Joan Steinbrenner (née Zieg) (1935–2018). He has two sisters, Jessica Steinbrenner and Jennifer Steinbrenner (formerly Swindal). He is the younger brother of Hank Steinbrenner, who died in 2020.

Steinbrenner attended Culver Military Academy and went on to graduate from Williams College in 1991 with a Bachelor of Arts degree. He then earned a Master of Business Administration at the University of Florida in 1994.

The Steinbrenner family also collectively owns more than 25% of YES Network, 20% of MLS's New York City FC, a stake in Legends Hospitality and 10% of Italian soccer club AC Milan.

=== Professional career ===
Starting in 2007, George Steinbrenner gradually ceded day-to-day control of the Yankees to Hal and his other son, Hank, as his health worsened. Hal Steinbrenner was elected chairman of the board of Yankee Global Enterprises on September 28, 2007.

On November 20, 2008, Major League Baseball owners approved the shift of day-to-day control of the Yankees from father George Steinbrenner to Hal Steinbrenner.

Since taking over the organization, the Yankees have won the 2009 World Series, two American League pennants, made the playoffs eleven times, and opened a new stadium in 2009.

In January 2011, Steinbrenner overruled general manager Brian Cashman and signed pitcher Rafael Soriano to a three-year, $35 million contract.

On August 30, 2022, Steinbrenner acquired a minority share of Italian soccer club AC Milan.

== Other roles ==
Hal Steinbrenner is chairman and CEO of Steinbrenner Hotel Properties and is on the board of directors of the Boys and Girls Club of Tampa Bay.

== Personal life ==
Steinbrenner is a pilot. He owns a GTO single-engine and a Cessna high-wing plane.

He is married to Cristina DiTullio, a native of Staten Island, New York. Steinbrenner has a daughter named Katherine (b. 1997) with his first wife, Christina Lavery, whom he divorced in 2007.
