= Joan Steinbrenner =

American philanthropist and baseball executive (1935–2018)

Steinbrenner

Elizabeth Joan Steinbrenner (née Zieg; August 25, 1935 – December 14, 2018) was an American philanthropist and vice-chair of the New York Yankees baseball team.

== Early life and education ==
Elizabeth Joan Zieg was born in Mount Vernon, Ohio, to a "wealthy family involved in real estate development" and attended Upper Arlington High School in Columbus, where she played basketball, football, and hockey.

She studied dental hygiene at Ohio State University.

== Career ==
In 1973, her husband, George Steinbrenner, led a group of investors who bought the New York Yankees baseball team, and she became involved with running the business. She continued to work for the team after her husband's death in 2010.

In 1977 Steinbrenner bought the Bay Harbor Inn in Tampa, Florida. In the 1980s, she was vice-chair of the Tampa Bay Downs board of directors, eventually buying and racing horses with her husband under the Kinsman Stables name, and greyhounds under the kennel name Jo-Bett Kennels, with a friend, Betty Hater.

Steinbrenner worked with a large number of philanthropic organizations throughout her life, including the Cleveland Orchestra, the Lake Erie Nature and Science Center, Boys & Girls Clubs of Tampa, Tampa Bay Junior Volleyball Club, Children's Home Network of Tampa, the Red Cross of Tampa, the American Cancer Society of Tampa, and the Florida Special Olympics. In Florida, she was state chairwoman for the Special Olympics held there in 1981 and 1982 and sat on the boards of the National Society to Prevent Blindness, the St. Joseph's Hospitals Foundation in Tampa, the Children's Home Network in Tampa and the Florida Orchestra, for which she, along with her husband and the New York Yankees, underwrote productions.

In the late 1990s, Steinbrenner and her husband contributed to the renovation of the band room at Ohio Stadium; the room was renamed the Joan Zieg Steinbrenner Band Center in 2001.

During the investigation into her husband's dealings with gambler Howard Spira it was revealed that Spira had once taped a conversation with her in which he asked her to pressure her husband into giving him a job or paying him off. Steinbrenner chastised him and told him, "Howard, I think you need to see a doctor. I really do."

Steinbrenner was a founding member of Town and Gown, a group that connected the University of South Florida with the Tampa community and was also a founding member of the Henry B. Plant Museum Society. In 2017, St. Joseph's Hospitals Foundation honoured her as a "Community Hero" for her work with the hospitals.

== Personal life ==
On May 12, 1956, she married George Steinbrenner, a businessman, and together they had four children. George died in 2010 at the age of 80, while Joan died on December 14, 2018, at her home in Tampa, Florida.

== See also ==
- Steinbrenner family
