= Eugene McHale =

American baseball executive

Eugene J. McHale was president of the New York Yankees of Major League Baseball.

McHale joined the Yankees' front office in 1972. He was named Yankees president in 1983, succeeding Lou Saban. McHale served as an administrator, not involving himself in player personnel decisions. When he resigned in 1986, Yankees' owner George Steinbrenner left the position of president vacant. He later became president and owner of American Sports Associates, a consulting firm, which helped Tempe, Arizona, in its attempt to secure a new stadium.
