= William Stephen Devery =

American police commissioner (1854–1919)

- Devery in 1910
- Born: January 9, 1854; New York City, US
- Died: June 20, 1919 (aged 65); Far Rockaway, New York, US
- Occupations: New York City Police Superintendent Later changed to Chief of Police; Baseball team owner
- Children: 2

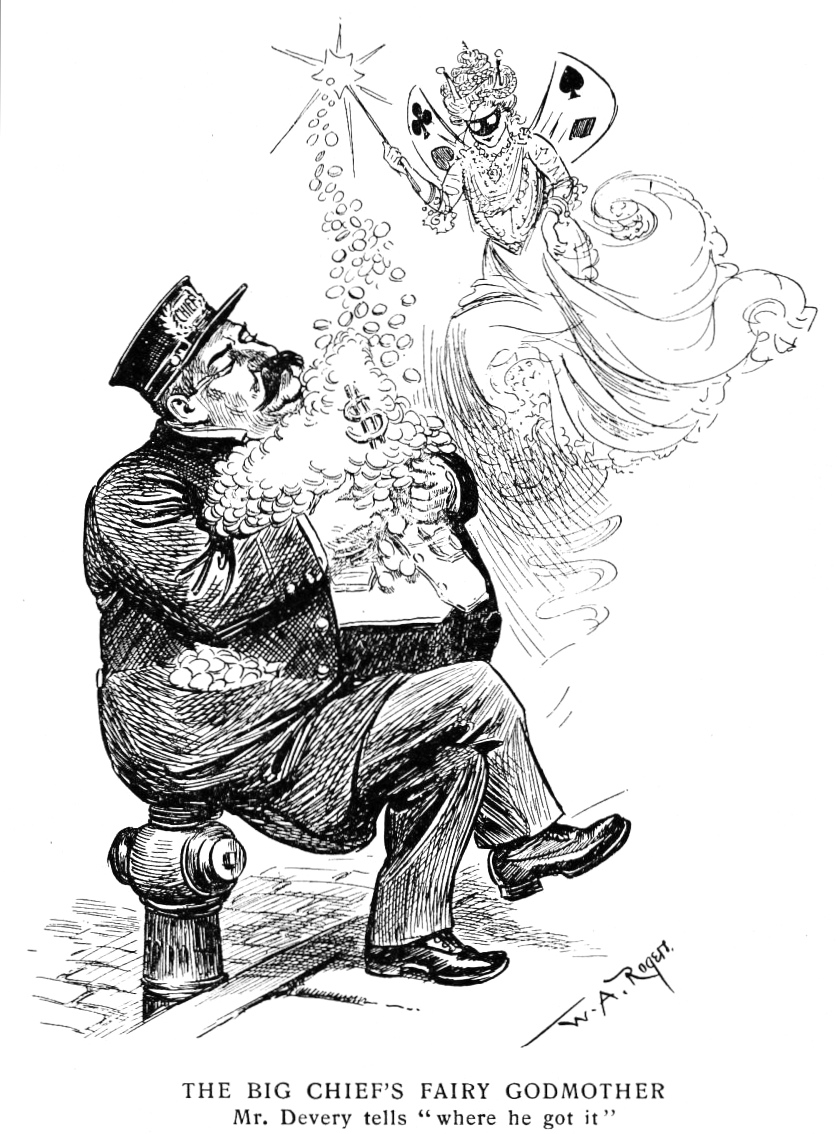
William S. Devery satirized in Harper's Weekly on September 6, 1902, by William Allen Rogers.

William Stephen Devery (January 9, 1854 – June 20, 1919), nicknamed "Big Bill". was the last superintendent of the New York City Police Department police commission and the first police chief in 1898. Devery and Frank J. Farrell later co-owned the New York Yankees of Major League Baseball.

== Biography ==
He was born in New York City in 1854. In 1878, at age 24, he was hired as a patrolman. On September 16, 1881, he was made a roundsman, and on May 28, 1884, he was promoted to a sergeant. On December 30, 1891, after 13 years on the force, he was promoted to captain. As a police captain he once told his men, "They tell me there's a lot of grafting going on in this precinct. They tell me that you fellows are the fiercest ever on graft. Now that's going to stop! If there's any grafting to be done, I'll do it. Leave it to me." On February 5, 1897, he was arrested and charged with bribery and extortion. After conviction, he was dismissed from the force. He appealed his conviction in the New York Court of Appeals. It was overturned and he was reinstated to the force and promoted to inspector on January 7, 1898, and Deputy Chief on February 14, 1898. He was then appointed Chief of Police on June 30, 1898.

In 1899, Theodore Roosevelt and Republican state legislators established a committee, headed by Robert Mazet, to investigate Tammany Hall corruption under the leadership of Richard Croker. Lincoln Steffens, a popular journalist of that time wrote of Devery, "As a Chief of Police, he is a disgrace, but as a character, he is a work of art." In 1901, the Police Department was re-organized again, and has been headed ever since by a Police Commissioner. The first Commissioner Michael C. Murphy appointed Devery as his Deputy Commissioner. Both Murphy and Devery went out of office on January 1, 1902, when Seth Low became Mayor of New York.

Later, with Frank J. Farrell, he bought the Baltimore, Maryland American League baseball team and moved it to New York and renamed it the Highlanders. The team almost won the American League pennant in 1904, but otherwise had poor records during the Farrell-Devery ownership era. For $300K, they sold the team in 1915 to Jacob Ruppert Jr. and Tillinghast L' Hommedieu Huston.

He died on June 20, 1919, at 4:15 p.m. of apoplexy in Far Rockaway, New York.

== See also ==
- List of New York Yankees owners and executives

Government offices
Preceded by John McCullagh as Superintendent of Police	Chief of the New York City Police; 1898–1901	Succeeded by Michael C. Murphy as Police Commissioner
Business positions
Preceded by Ban Johnson	Owner of the New York Yankees with Frank J. Farrell 1903–1915	Succeeded by Jacob Ruppert Jr. and Tillinghast L' Hommedieu Huston
