= List of New York Yankees owners and executives =

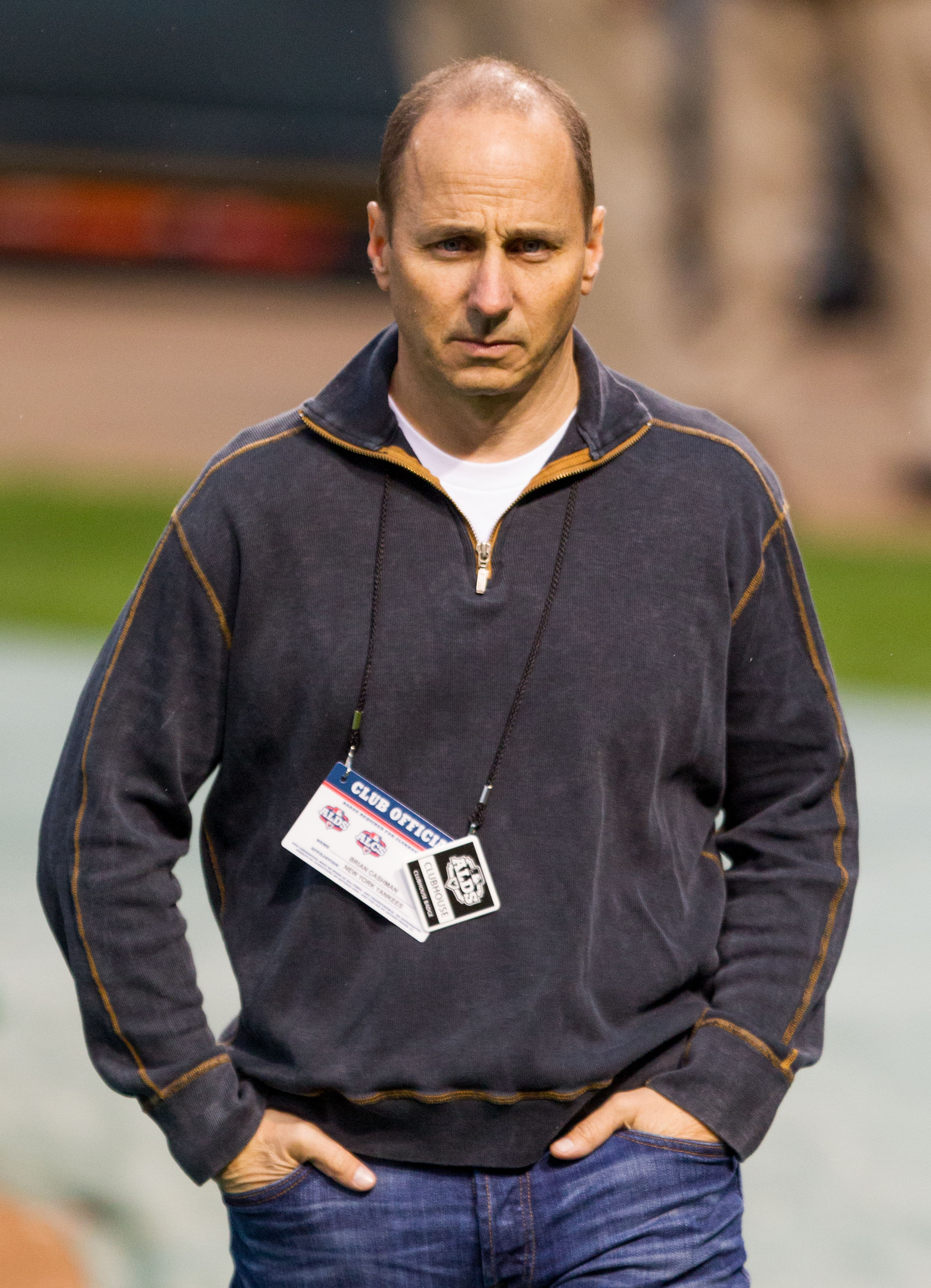
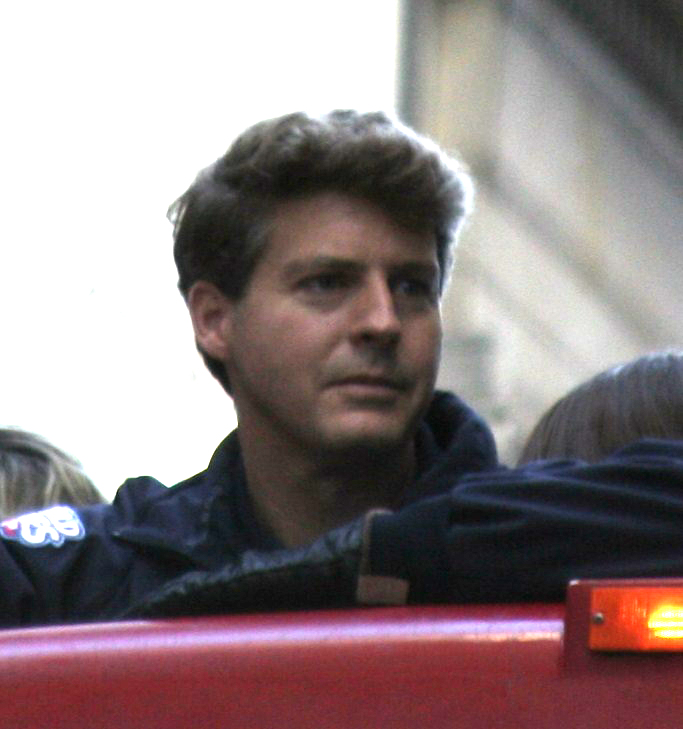
Brian Cashman (left) and Hal Steinbrenner (right) are the current general manager and chairman of the New York Yankees, respectively.

The New York Yankees are a Major League Baseball (MLB) franchise based in The Bronx, New York City, New York. They play in the American League East division. This list consists of the owners, general managers (GMs) and other executives of the Yankees. The GM controls player transactions, hires the manager and coaching staff, and negotiates with players and agents regarding contracts.

The longest-tenured general manager in team history is Brian Cashman, who serves in that role for 26 years and counting. The longest-tenured owner in team history is George Steinbrenner, who was the team's principal owner from 1973 until his death in 2010.

== Principal owners ==
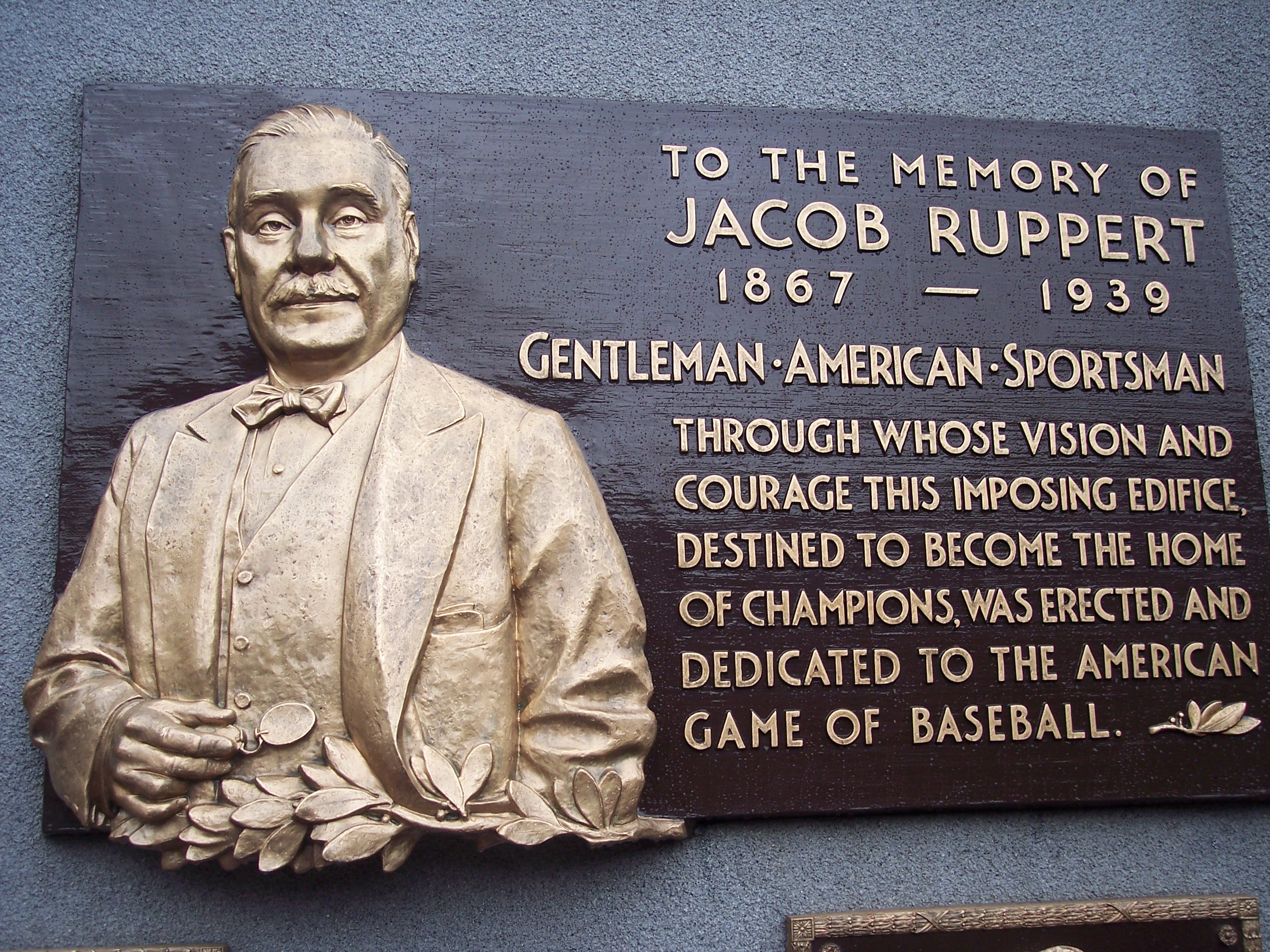
Jacob Ruppert's plaque in Monument Park

During the 1901 and 1902 seasons, the franchise played in Baltimore as the "Baltimore Orioles". They became defunct, but were purchased by William Stephen Devery and Frank J. Farrell for $18,000 and moved to New York in 1903. Jacob Ruppert and Tillinghast L'Hommedieu Huston purchased the Yankees in 1915, and Ruppert bought out Huston in 1922.

Dan Topping, Larry MacPhail, and Del Webb purchased the Yankees from Ruppert's estate in 1945. Topping and Webb forced MacPhail out of the Yankees ownership group due to his confrontational behavior after the 1947 World Series. In 1964, Topping and Webb sold the team to CBS, during which time the franchise struggled. Selling the team at a loss, CBS sold the team to a group headed by George Steinbrenner in 1973. While Steinbrenner initially owned less than half of the team, he bought out many of his partners, eventually owning 70% of the team. John McMullen, one of Steinbrenner's limited partners, said, "There is nothing in life quite so limited as being a limited partner of George Steinbrenner."

Under Steinbrenner's ownership, YankeeNets was formed after a merger of the business operations of the Yankees and New Jersey Nets. After the Nets were sold to Bruce Ratner, YankeeNets became a limited liability company (LLC) known as Yankee Global Enterprises. The LLC owns the Yankees and the YES Network. Hal Steinbrenner succeeded his father as control person of the Yankees in 2008.

Key
†	Member of the Baseball Hall of Fame
^	Co-owners
Tenure	Tenure refers to MLB seasons, not necessarily dates hired and fired

List of team owners, showing tenure of service
Name	Tenure	Ref(s)
John McGraw^{†}	1901–1902^{^}	
William Stephen Devery	1903–1915^{^}	
Frank J. Farrell	1903–1915^{^}	
Tillinghast L'Hommedieu Huston	1915–1922^{^}	
Jacob Ruppert^{†}	1915–1939^{^}	
Jacob Ruppert Estate	1939–1945	
Larry MacPhail^{†}	1945–1947^{^}	
Dan Topping	1945–1964^{^}	
Del Webb	1945–1964^{^}	
Columbia Broadcasting System	1964–1973	
George Steinbrenner	1973–2010	
Hal Steinbrenner	2010–present^{^}	
Hank Steinbrenner	2010–2020^{^}	

== General managers ==
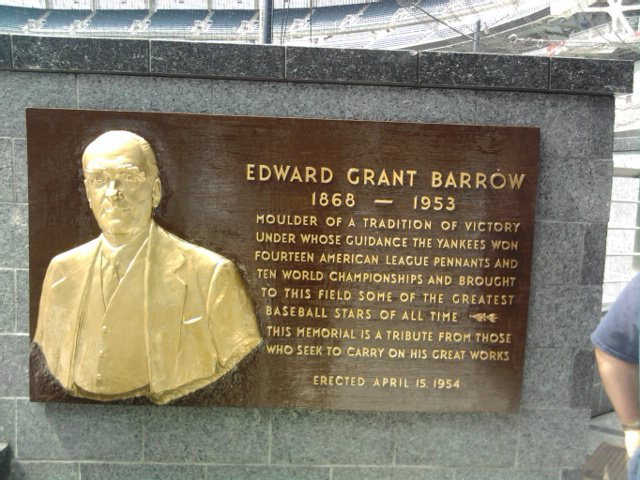
Ed Barrow's plaque in Monument Park

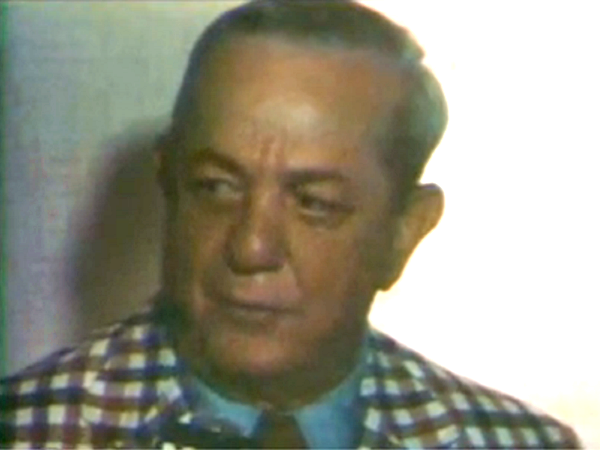
Gabe Paul was general manager of the Yankees during the 1977 World Series.

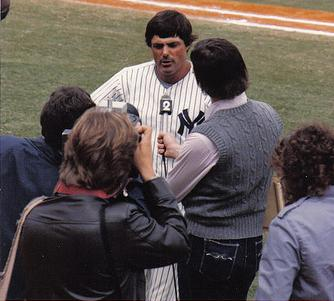
Lou Piniella served as field manager and general manager in 1988.

Four Yankees GMs are enshrined in the National Baseball Hall of Fame: Ed Barrow, George Weiss, Larry MacPhail, and his son, Lee MacPhail. Ralph Houk, Gene Michael, Lou Piniella, and Bob Watson were former Yankees players. Houk, Michael and Piniella served as field managers for the Yankees before becoming GM.

List of general managers, showing tenure
Name	Tenure	Ref(s)
Ed Barrow^{†}	1921–1944	
Larry MacPhail^{†}	1945–1947	
George Weiss^{†}	1948–1960	
Roy Hamey	1961–1963	
Ralph Houk	1964–1966	
Dan Topping, Jr.	1966	
Lee MacPhail^{†}	1967–1973	
Gabe Paul	1974–1977	
Cedric Tallis	1978–1979	
Gene Michael	1980–1981; 1990–1995	
Bill Bergesch	1982–1983	
Murray Cook	1984	
Clyde King	1985–1986	
Woody Woodward	1987	
Lou Piniella	1988	
Bob Quinn	1988–1989	
Harding "Pete" Peterson	1990	
Bob Watson	1996–1997	
Brian Cashman	1998–present	

== See also ==
Current team executives

- Randy Levine, president
- Lonn A. Trost, Esq., chief operating officer and general counsel
- Damon Oppenheimer, director of amateur scouting
- Reggie Jackson, special assistant to the general manager
- Tino Martinez, special assistant to the general manager
- Alex Rodriguez, special advisor to the general manager
- Hideki Matsui, special advisor to the general manager
- Stump Merrill, special assistant to the general manager

Related lists

- List of New York Yankees managers
- List of New York Yankees coaches
