= Frank J. Farrell =

American baseball executive

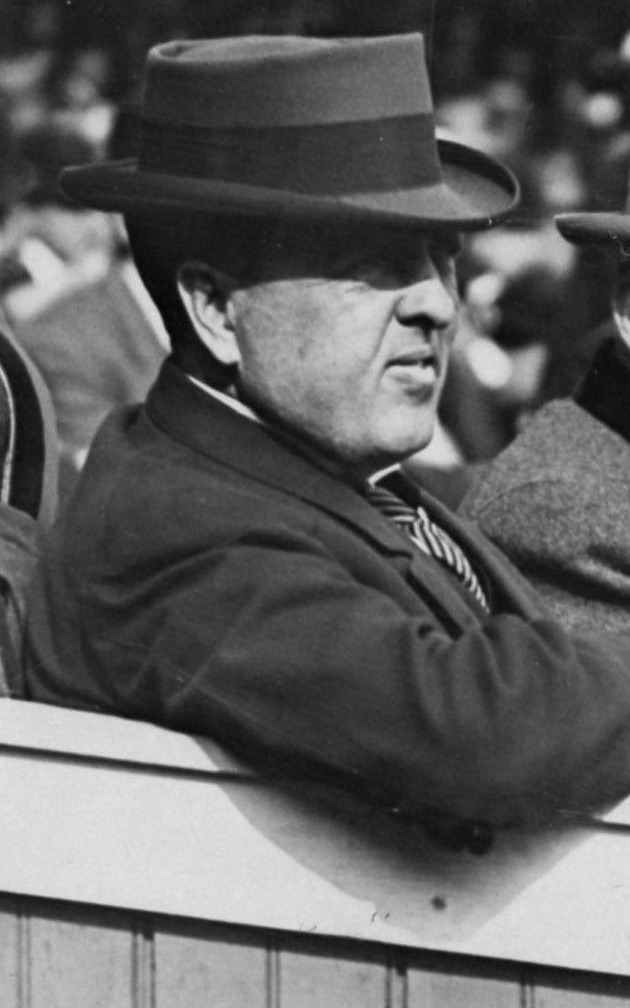
- Born: c. 1866; New York City, U.S.
- Died: February 10, 1926; Atlantic City, New Jersey, U.S.
- Occupation: Baseball
- Spouse: Anna E. (c. 1886–aft. 1926)

Frank J. Farrell (c. 1866 – February 10, 1926) was an American baseball executive. He and William S. Devery were the first owners of the New York Highlanders (now New York Yankees). They purchased the Baltimore Orioles on January 9, 1903, for $18,000 and moved it to New York City.

== Biography ==
He was born around 1866. Farrell was involved in New York City gambling, and owned pool halls and a casino. At one time he was the partner of William Burbridge.

In 1912 he fired Harry Wolverton as the manager of the Yankees. On January 29, 1915, Farrell and Devery sold the Yankees to Jacob Ruppert and Tillinghast L'Hommedieu Huston for $460,000.

Farrell died in Atlantic City, New Jersey, of a heart attack, after recovering from a bout of bronchitis.

== See also ==
- List of New York Yankees owners and executives

Preceded by Ban Johnson	Owner of the New York Yankees with William S. Devery 1903–1915	Succeeded by Jacob Ruppert and Tillinghast L'Hommedieu Huston
