= List of books bound in human skin =

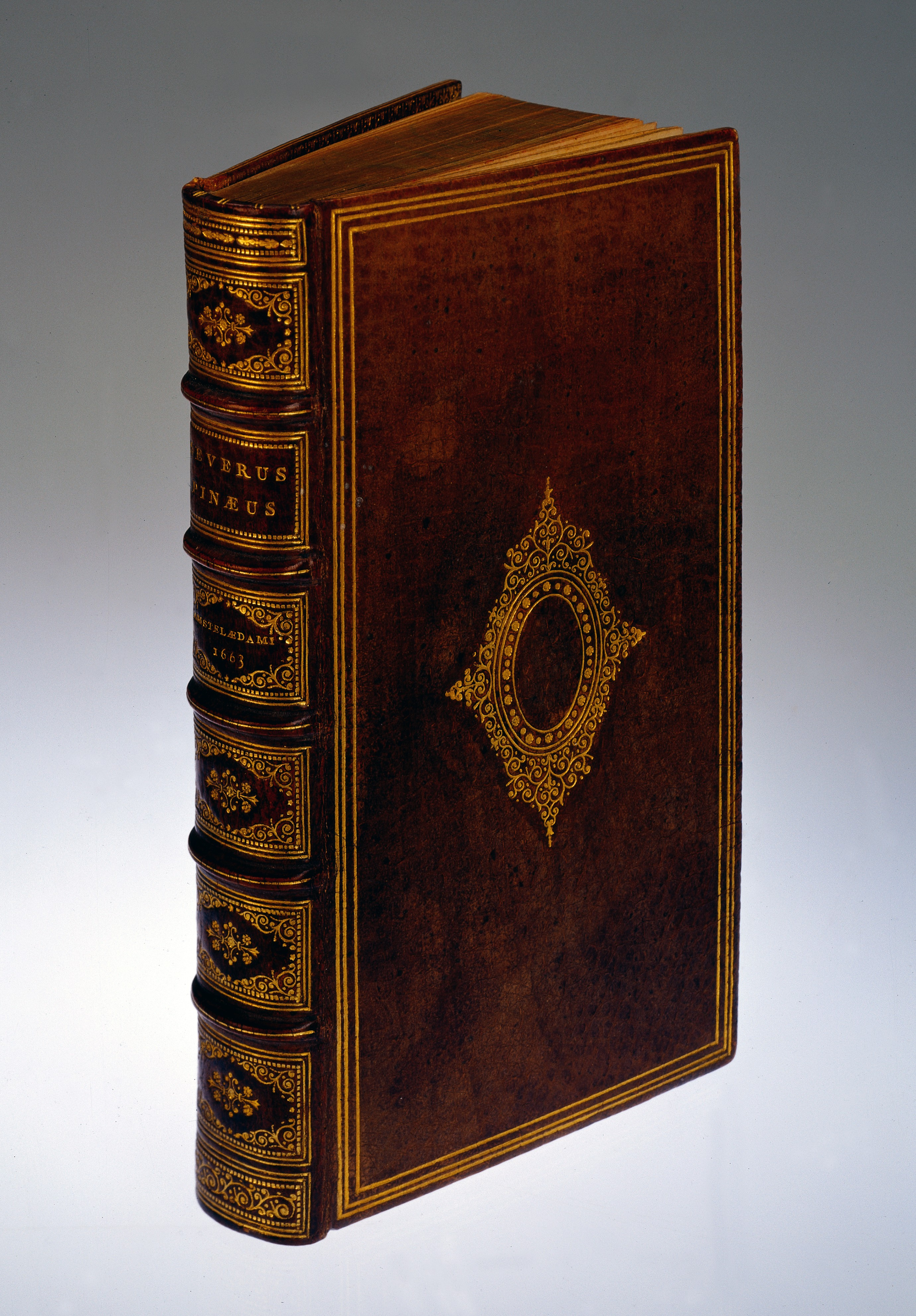
A copy of De integritatis et corruptionis virginum notis kept in the Wellcome Library, believed to be bound in human skin

Anthropodermic bibliopegy—the binding of books in human skin—peaked in the 19th century. The practice was most popular amongst doctors, who had access to cadavers in their profession. It was nonetheless a rare phenomenon even at the peak of its popularity, and fraudulent claims were commonplace; by 2020, the Anthropodermic Book Project had confirmed the existence of 18 books bound in human skin, out of 31 tested cases.

The ability to unequivocally identify book bindings as being of human skin dates only to the mid-2010s. For many years, identification tended to be visual, based predominantly on the structure of pores such as hair follicles in the skin. This could be combined with evidence as circumstantial as the bindings being of subjectively poor quality—taken as a sign the skin used was acquired through suspicious means. In the early twenty-first century, DNA testing emerged as a potential means of identification, but this was confounded by human handling; items frequently touched by human hands could produce false positives, as tests would pick up on their remnants. DNA testing also proved non-viable owing to the degradation of DNA over time and the acceleration of such degradation by the tanning process used to turn skin into leather. The development of peptide mass fingerprinting permitted conclusive testing and became the gold standard method. The first book confirmed as authentic through its use was in 2014; it was a copy of Des destinées de l'ame by the French philosopher Arsène Houssaye, held in the Houghton Library of Harvard University. Ten years later, Harvard University removed the book's anthropodermic bindings due to ethical concerns.

Not all putatively anthropodermic books have been subject to such testing. A library or archive may decline testing if their policies prohibit any technically destructive tests; peptide mass fingerprinting requires removing a minuscule portion of the book's bindings. Other collections may be unwilling to suffer possible negative publicity if a book is confirmed as bound in human skin. Many others still remain to be tested, including those bound in the skin of executed criminals. While such books are generally treated as legitimate, due to their clear provenance compared to the mysterious or untraceable origins of most anthropodermic books, it is possible individual cases may be fraudulent. Such cases are further complicated by requests by descendants to return such books to the families, after which they may be buried or destroyed before they can be tested.

Themes emerge in what purportedly anthropodermic books turn out to be legitimate or illegitimate. Books that call attention to the race of those whose skin was used to bind them, for instance, generally turn out to be frauds. Most legitimate anthropodermic books were owned or bound by physicians, and many of them are dedicated to the practice of medicine. In her book Dark Archives, the anthropodermic bibliopegy expert Megan Rosenbloom connects this to changing standards of medical ethics and the relatively recent emergence of the concept of consent in medicine.

== Confirmed ==
Books confirmed through peptide mass fingerprinting
Book	Year	Author	Location	Notes	Ref(s)
Narrative of the Life of James Allen	1837	James Allen	Boston Athenæum	The deathbed confession of James Allen, a nineteenth-century highwayman in Massachusetts. He requested a copy of his printed memoirs be bound in his skin and gifted to John Fenno, a man who had resisted Allen's attempt to rob him; it is the only known anthropodermic book bound with the consent of its source. Before being bequeathed to the Athenæum, Fenno's copy was reportedly kept in the family home and used to spank his children.	
Le traicté de Peyne: poëme allégorique dédié à Monseigneur et à Madame de Lorraynne	16th century	Anonymous	Grolier Club	A BDSM-oriented erotic poem, and the only known example of anthropodermic erotica. The anthropodermic copy is a nineteenth-century printing. Rosenbloom gives the book as an example of the diversity of anthropodermic books; prior to its confirmation, she and the Anthropodermic Book Project assumed there were no authentic examples of erotica bound in human skin.	
Recueil des secrets	1635	Louise Boursier	College of Physicians of Philadelphia	A compilation of contemporary folk remedies by Boursier, the sage-femme (midwife) to the court, shortly following her retreat from court facing pressure from male physicians. The anthropodermic copy is from the collection of John Stockton Hough, a nineteenth-century physician and bibliophile who bound three books in the skin of Mary Lynch, an impoverished young Irish émigré he autopsied in 1869 and diagnosed with Philadelphia's first recorded case of trichinosis.	
Les nouvelles découvertes sur toutes les parties principales de l’homme, et de la femme	1680	Louis Barles	College of Physicians of Philadelphia	Another book from Hough's collection believed to be bound in Lynch's skin.	
Speculations on the Mode and Appearances of Impregnation in the Human Female	1789	Robert Couper	College of Physicians of Philadelphia	Another book from Hough's collection believed to be bound in Lynch's skin.	
De conceptione adversaria	1686	Charles Drelincourt	College of Physicians of Philadelphia	Hough's fourth book in the collection of the College of Physicians of Philadelphia; like Recueil des secrets and Speculations on the Mode and Appearances of Impregnation in the Human Female, about reproduction. Speculated to be bound in the skin of Thomas McCloskey, who died in the Philadelphia General Hospital in February 1869.	
Catalog des sciences médicales	1865	Bibliothèque nationale	Van Pelt Library, University of Pennsylvania	Another book from Hough's collection, potentially bound by Hough himself. Though all of Hough's anthropodermic books were bound in the late 1880s, the skin used for this book seems to have been acquired shortly prior to its binding, rather than the cases of Lynch and McCloskey, who died decades before and whose skins were kept over that time. The book is a catalogue of medical incunabula (early printed books of Europe). Rosenbloom described the work as "like a nineteenth-century library's equivalent of a phone directory" and expressed her surprise when the book was confirmed authentic, due to its tonal dissimilarity to other known anthropodermic books.	
An Elementary Treatise on Human Anatomy	1861	Joseph Leidy	College of Physicians of Philadelphia	One of Leidy's personal copies of his anatomical treatise and self-declared magnum opus. Leidy, an anatomist and paleontologist, volunteered as a surgeon and scientific researcher for the Civil War effort; he bound one of his copies of the book in the skin of a soldier killed in action.	
De Humani Corporis Fabrica Libri Septem	1543	Andreas Vesalius	John Hay Library, Brown University	A "text on human dissection"; two reportedly anthropodermic copies were bound by Josse Schavye during the 1860s. The copy at Brown was sold to alumnus William Louttit Jr in 1874 and eventually bequeathed to the university; it was confirmed as anthropodermic in 2015. The other copy's fate is unclear. Reportedly added to the Belgian royal family's personal library by King Albert I (countering a claim it was once owned by Leopold II), it has not been accounted for since the 1990s.	
Anatomy Epitomized and Illustrated	1682	Thomas Gibson	Huntington Library	An early anatomy manual, given by Rosenbloom as a representative example of known anthropodermic books.	
Poems on Various Subjects, Religious and Moral	1773	Phillis Wheatley	Cincinnati Public Library; University of Cincinnati	A collection of poems by Wheatley, the first African-American woman to publish a book, is one of very few works with multiple known anthropodermic copies. It is unclear why these copies were so bound; some have speculated they may be racially motivated, but no evidence supports the belief. Other anthropodermic books that claim racial motivations have been found inauthentic.	
Dance of Death	1526	Hans Holbein the Younger	John Hay Library, Brown University	Two printings of Holbein's Dance of Death woodcuts, from 1816 and 1898 respectively, are confirmed to be bound in human skin. Reports predating peptide mass fingerprinting state that there are six anthropodermic copies.	
Mademoiselle Giraud, My Wife	1891	Adolphe Belot	John Hay Library, Brown University	An English translation of a French work, a tale of a man's mental breakdown following his lesbian wife leaving him; described by Jacob Gordon, special collections librarian at Juniata College, as Lovecraftian in its sensibility. Gordon describes the book's 2015 confirmation as anthropodermic as granting "unfortunate credence to the more dubious claims of erotic works bound in skin from a woman's breast".	
"The Gold-Bug"	1843	Edgar Allan Poe	Private collection	Poe's breakthrough novelette, which had a hand in a contemporary fashion for cryptography. Held by a French collector, one of the few confirmed anthropodermic works in private collections. An inscription on the flyleaf referencing the copy's anthropodermic provenance is attributed to Charles Erskine Scott Wood, and implies it may have once been owned by John Steinbeck.	
Essai sur les lieux et les dangers des sépultures	1778	Félix Vicq-d'Azyr	Royal Library of Belgium	Mentioned in Rosenbloom's list of confirmed anthropodermic books, without further detail.	
Nazi photo album	c. 1940s	Unknown	Auschwitz-Birkenau State Museum	A Nazi photo album likely created at the Buchenwald concentration camp from the skin of Holocaust victims. The book was confirmed by researchers at the Auschwitz-Birkenau State Museum in 2020 to be made of human skin with fourier-transform infrared spectroscopy.	

== Supposed ==
Suspected but unconfirmed cases
Book	Location	Notes	Ref(s)
De integritatis et corruptionis virginum notis (1597, Séverin Pineau)	Wellcome Library	A "frank treatise on virginity"; like Des destinées de l'ame, bound by bookbinder Ludovic Bouland reportedly in a woman's skin. Though the book has not been subject to peptide mass fingerprinting, follicle inspection in 2002 concluded it was authentic. Rosenbloom considers it authentic based on this analysis and Bouland's history.	
Justine (1791, Marquis de Sade) and Juliette (1797, Marquis de Sade)	Presumed private collection	Long-standing rumours exist that copies of one or both of de Sade's erotic novels Justine and Juliette have been bound in human skin. No evidence exists that any library holds or has held potential anthropodermic copies of either.	
Éloge du sein des femmes (18th century, Claude-François-Xavier Mercier de Compiègne)	Private collection	La reliure française de 1900 à 1925, a 1932 reference work on French bookbinding, suggests several anthropodermic books were kept in private collections in France at the time. Photographic evidence exists for a copy of Éloge du sein des femmes (transl. "In Praise of Women's Breasts") bound in human skin with a visible nipple on the front cover.	
Anthropodermic Bibles	Various	Several claims exist regarding copies of the Bible bound in human skin. Rosenbloom refers to three medieval Bibles in the Bibliothèque nationale de France rumoured to be anthropodermic; none are available for testing. A Chinese copy of the New Testament reportedly bound in human skin is held by the library of the American Philosophical Society.	
Pamphlets by Bernhard Siegfried Albinus (between 1736–1741)	Lane Medical Library, Stanford University	Albinus, an anatomist and professor of medicine at Leiden University, published six pamphlets between 1736 and 1741 on subjects such as neuroanatomy, the origin of skin colour variation, and the anatomy of the penis. The printings of these pamphlets kept at the Lane Medical Library are reported to be bound in human skin; the library refuses testing.	
Pocketbook	Wellcome Library	A pocketbook reportedly bound in the skin of Crispus Attucks, traditionally believed to be the first American killed in the American Revolution. An attached label reads "The cover of this book is made of Tanned Skin from the Negro whose Execution caused the War of Independence". While it has not been subject to peptide mass fingerprinting, analysts consider the work a forgery likely made of camel, horse, or goat hide.	
The Chronicles of Nawat Wuzeer Hyderabad (1848, anonymous)	Newberry Library	Reportedly "found in the Palace of the King of Delhi" in 1857, with a note stating it was bound in human skin. The book came to wide attention following the 2003 publication of The Time Traveler's Wife, where the protagonist, a librarian at the Newberry Library, referred to its existence. Following this recognition, conservation staff who visually analyzed the book concluded it was bound in goatskin.	
Les terres du Ciel (1884, Camille Flammarion)	Library in Juvisy-sur-Orge	Held in a library c. 1924, location now unknown. The book is described as bound in the skin of a woman called the "Countess of Saint-Angel", described by the anthropologist Jennifer Kerner as "a charming name, though certainly not her own".	
An Authentic and Faithful History of the Mysterious Murder of Maria Marten (c. 1828, James Curtis)	Moyse's Hall	In 1827, a young woman named Maria Marten was murdered by her lover William Corder in what came to be known as the Red Barn Murder. The murder was discovered by Marten's stepmother Ann following a year of recurring dreams after her stepdaughter's disappearance. Following Corder's execution, his skin was used to bind his trial transcript. This book, like other books bound in the skin of criminals, is not officially confirmed; while such works are considered functionally confirmed due to their clear provenance, it cannot be ruled out that any individual copy is a hoax.	
The Poetical Works of John Milton (1807, John Milton)	Devon Heritage Centre	The ratcatcher George Cudmore was convicted of poisoning his wife and hanged in 1830; his skin was reportedly used to bind an 1852 printing of Milton's collected works.	
Trial transcript (1821)	M Shed	18-year-old John Horwood was hanged for murder at New Gaol, Bristol in 1821, becoming the first person executed there. His trial transcripts were bound with his skin. Later research raised questions about whether he was innocent, and his skeleton, formerly kept alongside the book at the M Shed museum, was repatriated to his descendants in 2011.	
Pocketbook (1829)	Surgeons' Hall Museum	A pocketbook made from the skin of William Burke, one of the perpetrators of the Burke and Hare murders; he and his accomplice Hare murdered sixteen people to sell their bodies to surgeons for dissection, profiting from the bustling trade in body-snatching. Rosenbloom described it as the "most famous of all the alleged human skin books".	

== Inauthentic ==
Confirmed forgeries
Book	Location	Notes	Ref(s)
Opera Joannis Pici Mirandule (1504, collected works)	Hesburgh Library, University of Notre Dame	The collected works of the Italian Renaissance philosopher Giovanni Pico della Mirandola, reportedly bound in the skin of a "Moorish chieftain" by Sebastian Carroll Braganza de la Coralla, a fabulist and supposed member of the Spanish nobility. Peptide mass fingerprinting confirmed the binding to be pigskin. Rosenbloom gives the work as an example of how supposedly anthropodermic books that draw attention to the race or ethnicity of their bindings are generally fraudulent.	
De l'imposture des diables (1579, Johann Weyer)	Private collection	Weyer was a physician and occultist who criticised the early modern era's persecution of people accused of witchcraft; De l'imposture des diables was one of his works on the subject. A copy in a private collection bore a note of an "interesting but doubtful" claim by a prior owner it was anthropodermic; testing disclaimed the possibility.	
Le triple vocabulaire infernal (1847, Simon-François Blocquel)	Private collection	A demonology manual in the same collection as De l'imposture des diables, also confirmed inauthentic.	
L'Idolatrie hvgvenote figurée au patron de la vieille payenne (1608, Louis Richeome)	McWherter Library, University of Memphis	A book on pagan iconography and practice in contemporary France; prior to testing, the book was traditionally mentioned by orientation guides to incoming freshmen while touring the library, "often receiving astonished gasps". Testing in 2015 found the bindings were sheepskin.	
L'office de l'église en Français (1671, Pierre le Petit and Charles Angot)	Bancroft Library, University of California, Berkeley	A prayer book in Latin and French. An inscription claims the book was rebound in human skin during the French Revolution, stating it "a matter of fact" that revolutionaries ran tanneries that processed the skins of the guillotined. No evidence exists that this practice ever occurred, and testing found the book to be bound in horsehide.	
Imiona Nurtu (1945, Tadeusz Borowski)	Private collection	The sole alleged anthropodermic book associated with the Nazi era was not one created by the Nazis at all, but rather one published by Holocaust survivors. Originally reported to be a copy of We Were in Auschwitz, the first published Holocaust memoir, it was in fact a copy of Imiona Nurtu, a poem by We Were in Auschwitz writer Tadeusz Borowski. The copy was gifted to fellow survivor Anatol Girs, Borowski's publisher, and suspected to be bound in human skin due to an unusual bruise-like pattern on the binding. Testing by the Anthropodermic Book Project revealed it was bound in rabbit skin.	
Practicarum quaestionum circa leges regias Hispaniae (1605, Juan Gutiérrez)	Houghton Library, Harvard University	A treatise on contemporary Spanish law, one of the three purportedly anthropodermic books kept at Harvard prior to the advent of peptide mass fingerprinting and one of two confirmed to be inauthentic. An inscription claims the source of the supposed bindings was flayed alive by Zulu warriors, and that his friend, the bookbinder, was able to reclaim the skin from a "King Mbesa".	
El Largo Viaje (1963, Tere Medina-Navascués)	Bailey Library, Slippery Rock University	A 1972 printing of a work of "Spanish erotic poetry" originally purchased for the library's regular collection. Years after the purchase, an inscription was discovered claiming the book was bound in the skin of a Native tribesman in Puerto Rico; it was moved to special collections for safekeeping. In 2014, it was found to be bound in artificial leather.	
Metamorphoses (8 AD, Ovid)	Countway Library of Medicine, Harvard University	A 1597 printing of the epic poem traditionally considered Ovid's magnum opus. The book was considered anthropodermic for many years prior to its confirmation as being bound in sheepskin.	
Bibliotheca Politica (c. 1693, James Tyrell)	Beeghly Library, Juniata College	Confirmed by peptide mass fingerprinting to be bound in sheepskin.	
Quran	Cleveland Public Library	A copy of the Quran kept in the John Griswold White collection of the Cleveland Public Library bears a handwritten note inside that it was bound in human skin. The library was cautious about publicising the book due to Islamic taboos around body modification. In 2024, peptide mass fingerprinting confirmed it to be bound in sheepskin.	
The Poetical Works of Rogers, Campbell, J. Montgomery, Lamb, and Kirke White (1829, compilation)	National Library of Australia	A collection of eighteenth- and nineteenth-century poetry bequeathed to the library in 1917 by the bookseller Edward Petherick. In 1992, pathologists tested the connective tissues of samples of the binding and concluded with "99 percent confidence" the book was anthropodermic. However, upon testing by the University of Sydney in August 2025 using mass spectrometry, it was found to be inauthentic, and likely bound in sheepskin.	

== Former ==
Books that were formerly bound in human skin
Book	Location	Notes	Ref(s)
Des destinées de l'ame (1879, Arsène Houssaye)	Houghton Library, Harvard University	The first anthropodermic book confirmed to be authentic through peptide mass fingerprinting, in 2014. Described by Bouland as bound in the skin of a woman living in a mental institution who had died of a stroke; an inscription on the flyleaf states "A book on the human soul merits that it be given human clothing". The binding on Des destinées de l'ame was removed in 2024, following a decision by the Harvard Museum Collections Returns Committee and the Harvard Library.	

== Gallery ==
Example confirmed, suspected, or claimed anthropodermic books
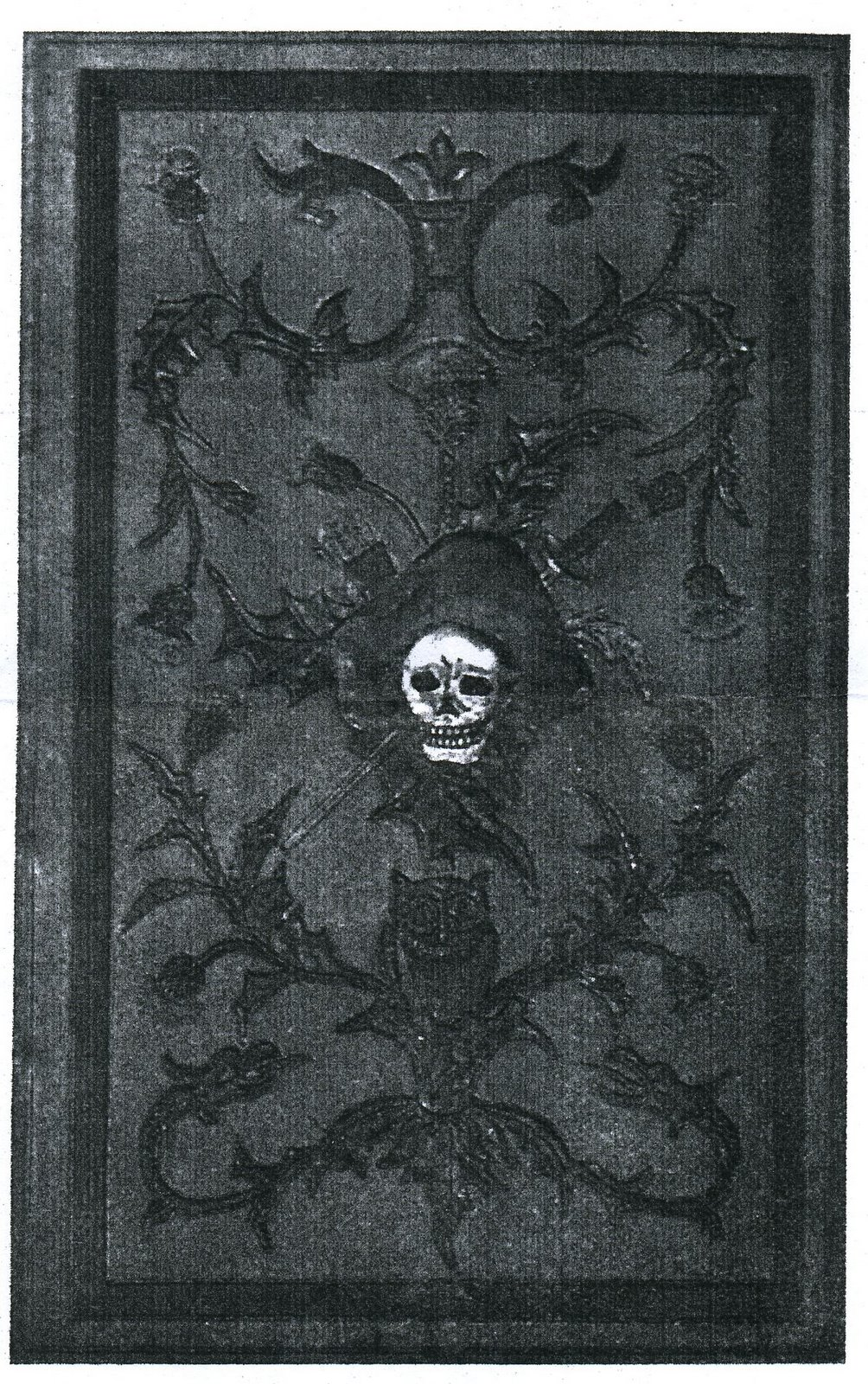
A reputedly anthropodermic copy of Hans Holbein's Dance of Death woodcuts; two copies have been confirmed as anthropodermic

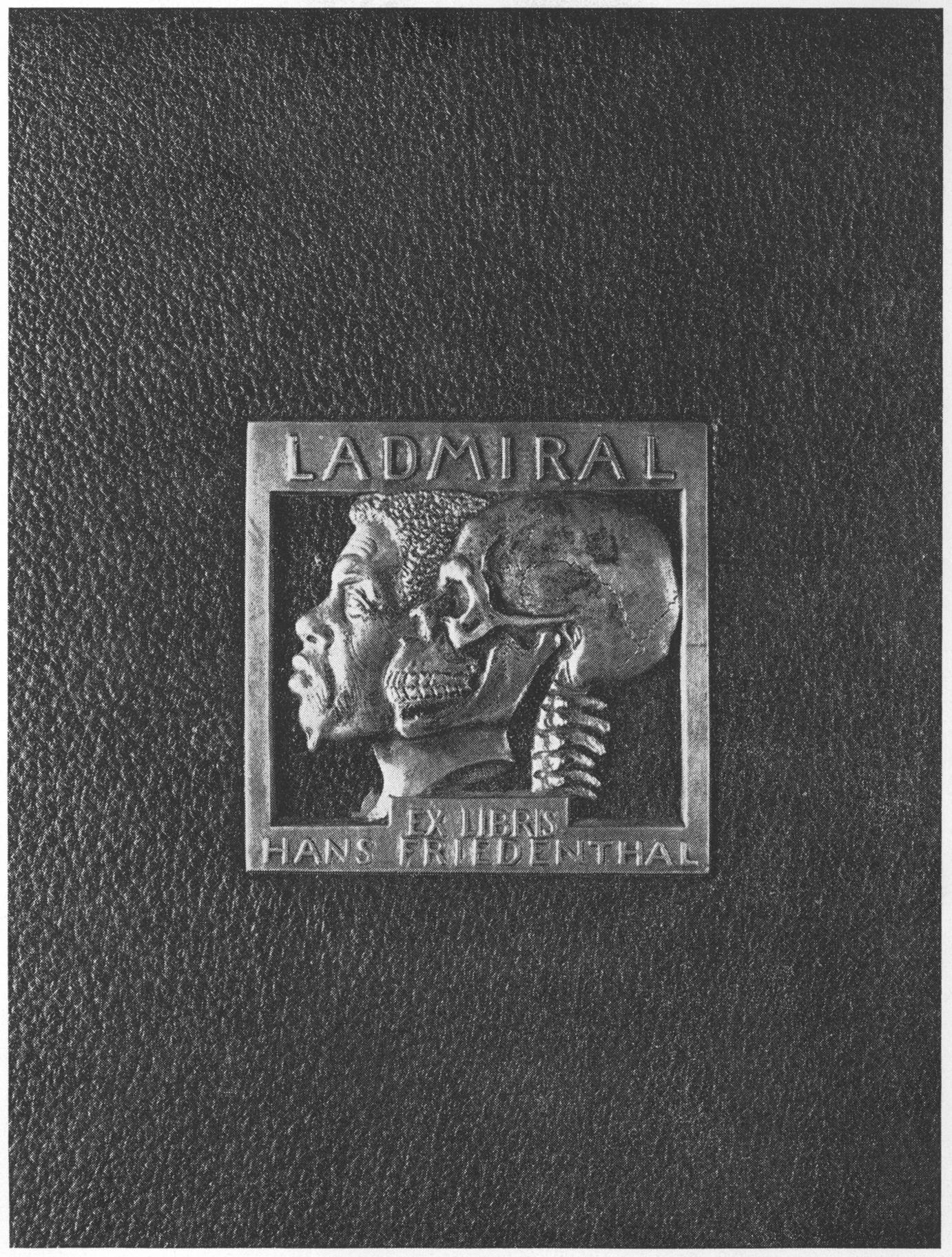
One of Bernhard Siegfried Albinus's pamphlets on anatomy kept at the Lane Medical Library

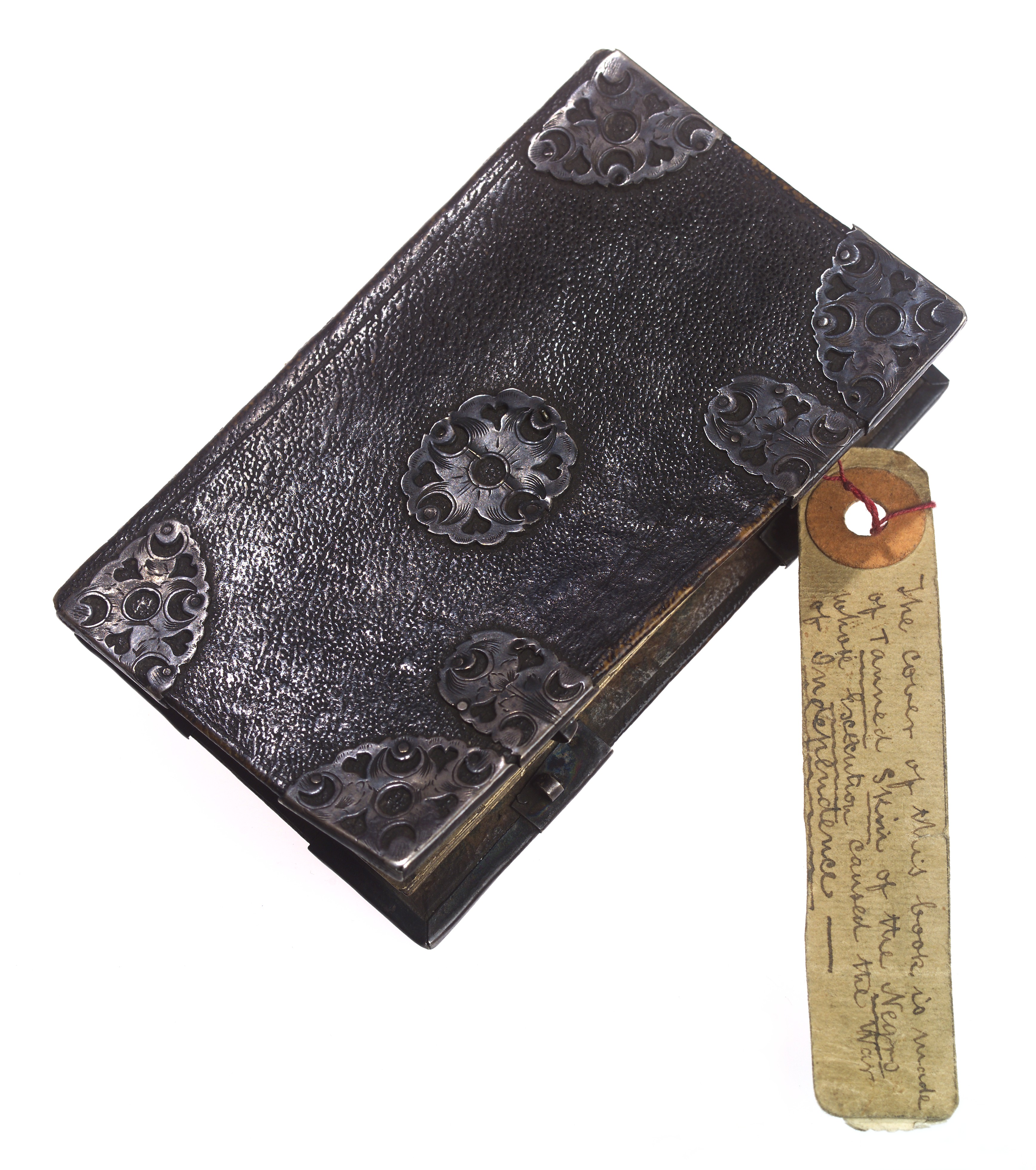
The pocketbook reportedly bound in the skin of Crispus Attucks, considered most likely made of camel, horse, or goat hide

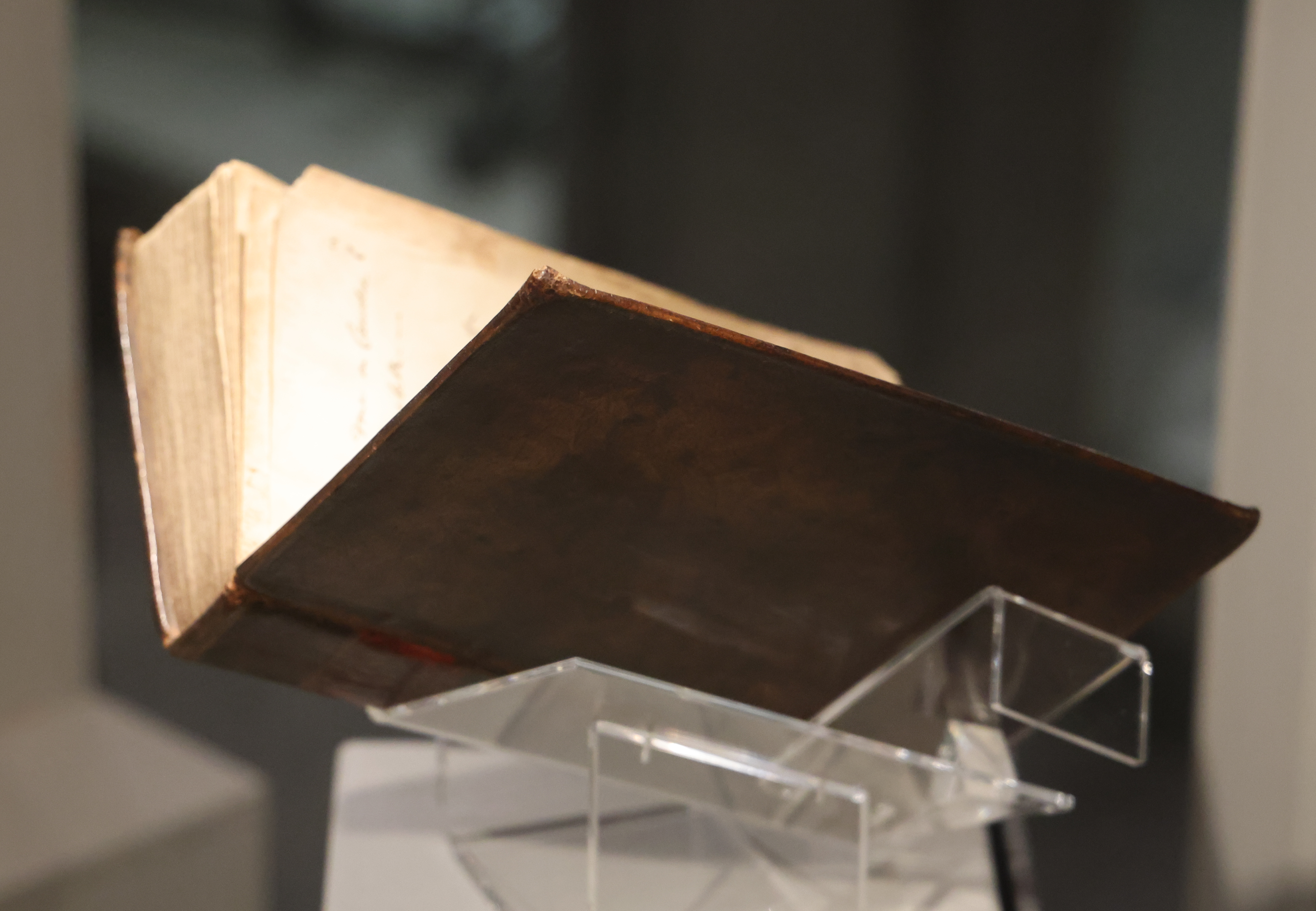
Trial transcripts of the Red Barn Murder, reportedly bound in its perpetrator's skin

== See also ==
- Blood Quran
- Dark Archives
- Lampshades made from human skin
- List of individual body parts
