= Houssaye =

- Armand Lebrun de La Houssaye (1768–1848), French general of the Napoleonic wars.
- Arsène Houssaye (1815-1896), French novelist, poet and man of letters.
- Henry Houssaye (1848-1911), a French historian and academician, son of Arsène.

== See also ==
- La Houssaye, a commune in the Eure department in northern France.
- La Houssaye-en-Brie, a commune in the Seine et Marne department in the great east of Paris
- Château de la Houssaye, few castles in France
