= Dark Archives =

2020 non-fiction book by Megan Rosenbloom

- Author: Megan Rosenbloom
- Publisher: Farrar, Straus and Giroux
- Publication date: October 2020
- Pages: 288
- ISBN: 978-0-374-13470-9
- Dewey Decimal: 002

Dark Archives: A Librarian's Investigation into the Science and History of Books Bound in Human Skin is a 2020 non-fiction book by the medical librarian and death-positive advocate Megan Rosenbloom. Dealing with anthropodermic bibliopegy, the binding of books in human skin, it expounds upon Rosenbloom's research on such books and their historical, ethical, and cultural implications.

The book focuses on the relationship between anthropodermic bibliopegy and the history of medicine; most confirmed cases of such books were created or owned by medical professionals, in contrast to common stereotypes that they were associated with Nazi Germany, serial killers, or the French Revolution. Rosenbloom discusses how the practice reflects the changing attitudes towards consent, ownership, and disposal of human bodies, and how the history of anthropodermic books intertwines with the history of medical ethics as a field. She interviews librarians, archivists, collectors, and experts on the topic, and examines notable examples of such books and their origins. Though Rosenbloom supports the preservation and maintenance of anthropodermic books, Dark Archives also covers arguments to the contrary, such as those espoused by Princeton University Library senior librarian Paul Needham.

Dark Archives was published by Farrar, Straus and Giroux in October 2020. Critics praised the book for its thorough research, clear writing, and enthusiasm for rare books and their history. The perspective and history through which Rosenbloom approached the subject matter also attracted attention, some reviewers commending it and others questioning its sensitivity. Rosenbloom is one of the key figures in the death-positive movement; her philosophical affiliation with open discussions of mortality and opposition to death taboos is considered a core influence on her approach to anthropodermic books.

== Background ==
A book on the human soul merits that it be given human clothing.

— Note found in the Houghton Library's copy of Des destinées de l'ame by Arsène Houssaye, confirmed in 2014 to be bound in human skin

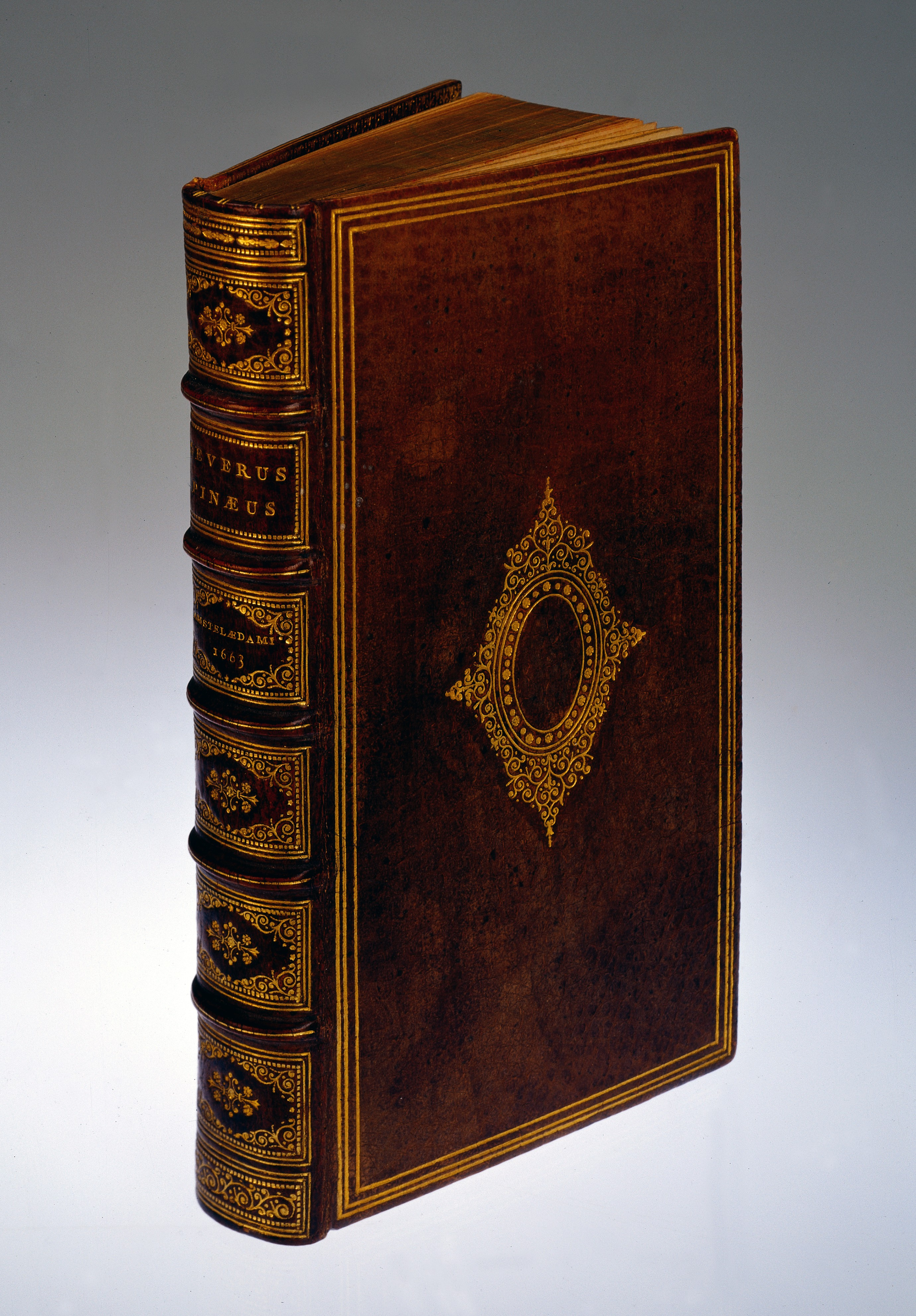
A copy of De integritatis et corruptionis virginum notis in the Wellcome Library, reportedly bound in human skin (Note: Follicle inspection in 2002 concluded the book was anthropodermic, but it has not been subject to peptide mass fingerprinting.)

Anthropodermic bibliopegy—the binding of books in human skin—peaked in the 19th century. The practice was most popular among doctors, who had access to cadavers in their profession. It was nonetheless a rare phenomenon even at the peak of its popularity, and fraudulent claims were commonplace; by 2020, the Anthropodermic Book Project had confirmed the existence of 18 books bound in human skin, out of 31 claimed cases. Though anthropodermic bibliopegy is commonly associated with Nazi Germany and the Holocaust, there is no evidence to suggest the Nazis bound books in the skin of Holocaust victims, nor for similar claims such as lampshades made from human skin. The practice fell out of favor early in the twentieth century.

The ability to unequivocally identify book bindings as being of human skin dates only to the mid-2010s. For many years, identification tended to be visual, based predominantly on the structure of pores such as hair follicles in the skin. This could be combined with evidence as circumstantial as the bindings being of subjectively poor quality—taken as a sign the skin used was acquired through suspicious means. In the early twenty-first century, DNA testing emerged as a potential means of identification, but this was confounded by human handling; items frequently touched by human hands could produce false positives, as tests would pick up on their remnants. DNA testing also proved non-viable owing to the degradation of DNA over time and the acceleration of such degradation by the tanning process used to turn skin into leather. The origin of peptide mass fingerprinting permitted conclusive testing and became the gold standard method; the first book confirmed through its use was Des destinées de l'ame by the French philosopher Arsène Houssaye, held in the Houghton Library of Harvard University.

Megan Rosenbloom is a collection strategies librarian at the University of California, Los Angeles, and formerly a medical librarian at the University of Southern California. Rosenbloom is a high-profile member of the death-positive movement, an ideological stance that supports the repudiation of death taboos and what it considers a "culture of silence" around death. She collaborated with the mortician Caitlin Doughty to form the concept, helping to establish organizations such as The Order of the Good Death. Before entering library science, she worked as a journalist. The genesis for Dark Archives was Rosenbloom's experiences in library school working for a medical publisher near Philadelphia's Mütter Museum, where she encountered several anthropodermic books. Her surprise to discover the practice was associated with "respectable" medical professionals, rather than the Nazis or serial killers as she had assumed, led her to research the phenomenon of anthropodermic bibliopegy in greater depth.

== Synopsis ==
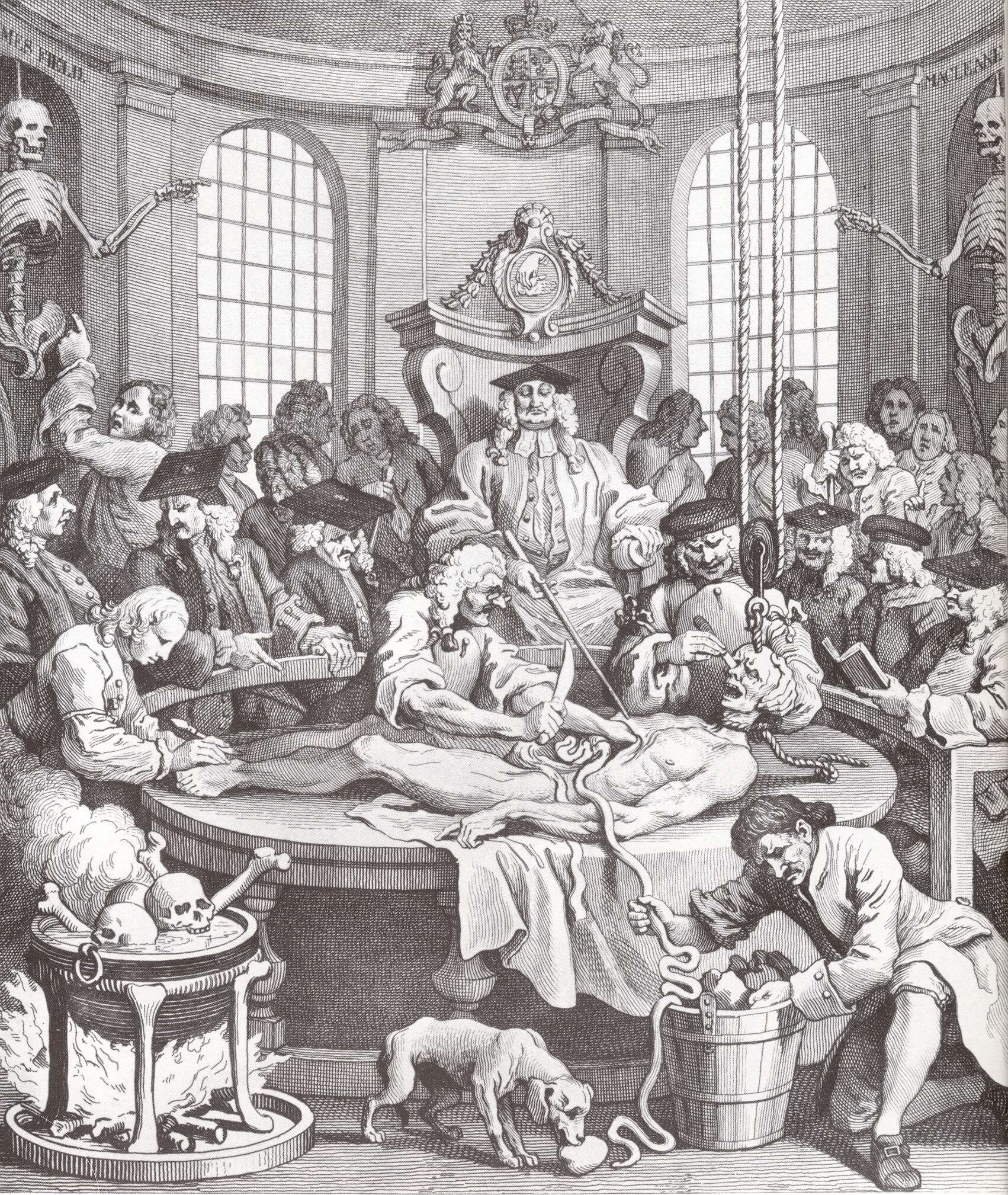
The Reward of Cruelty by William Hogarth, a 1751 depiction of anatomization of a criminal, a process which led to the binding of some anthropodermic books

Dark Archives revolves around the history, provenance, and myths of anthropodermic books. It focuses particularly on the relationship of anthropodermic bibliopegy with the history of medicine and medical ethics; most books confirmed to be bound in human skin were created or owned by medical professionals, and Rosenbloom discusses the implications of this for both historical and modern bioethics.

The book's preface and first chapter describe Rosenbloom's experiences at Mütter that led her to research books bound in human skin. They discuss the history of confirming the provenance of such books, including visual examination, DNA testing, and peptide mass fingerprinting (PMF), and Rosenbloom's co-founding of the Anthropodermic Book Project, which performs PMF testing on suspected anthropodermic books. Her discovery through testing that these books were almost always created by doctors leads her to further research the history of medical ethics. In the second chapter, Rosenbloom examines commonly held myths related to the production of anthropodermic books, such as their association with the French Revolution; contemporary rumor suggested revolutionaries created human-leather tanneries at Meudon that produced clothing and other objects made or bound with human skin. Several books were associated with these rumored tanneries, but none have stood up to PMF testing. Similarly, rumors regarding Nazi skin-bound books are discussed and dismissed.

Rosenbloom covers the variance in opinions about anthropodermic books amongst librarians and archivists. She recounts an interview with Paul Needham, a librarian at Princeton University Library, who is vocally opposed to the preservation of such bindings. Rosenbloom and Needham cover the issues involved in triaging what works can be preserved, against issues such as physical space, digitization of collections, and previous destructions. She argues that the preservation of such books is worthwhile for its own sake to further research on the practices behind them, while he believes that their rebinding is a moral necessity not overcome by archival concerns.

Notable examples of books bound in human skin are described, as well as significant people involved, both doctors associated with the practice and the people whose skin was used to bind such books. Rosenbloom associates anthropodermic bibliopegy with successful doctors from prestigious backgrounds who doubled as bibliophiles. Practitioners, she argued, generally had the wealth and opportunity to build vast book collections, and the desire to contribute to them with their own publications. The significant majority of identified anthropodermic books are about medicine, though Rosenbloom notes that the small sample complicates confident statements. She refers to the example of erotica; the possibility of erotic books being authentically bound in human skin was dismissed until the identification of "a nineteenth-century printing of a sixteenth-century French BDSM allegorical poem".

The skin of many kinds of people was used in the process of bookbinding, and the methods through which they came to medical awareness varied. Some such people died indigent in hospitals, where the doctors of the day considered their remains too valuable for medical research to return to their families. Others, such as William Corder who committed the Red Barn Murder, were criminals who were executed and anatomized as a component of their punishment. Virtually all these bindings were done without prior consent of the person involved, the only known exception being the highwayman James Allen, who insisted a copy of his memoirs be bound in his skin.

The emergence and evolution of medical ethics is a focus of Dark Archives. Rosenbloom notes that people's consent to the use of their body after death is a relatively recent concern in medicine; she quotes a statistic that it was not until the 1960s that "between 70 and 100 percent" of bodies used for medical student anatomical training were willingly donated, despite modern norms being strongly against nonconsensual body donation. She investigates modern phenomena with similar aesthetics to anthropodermic bibliopegy, such as postmortem tattoo preservation. In an interview with the director of Save My Ink Forever, a tattoo preservation nonprofit, Rosenbloom explores the implications and consequences of consent-based bioethics and how voluntary preservation differs legally from involuntary appropriation. The book also explores the differences between legal systems on these subjects; the United States is noted as having a particularly individualist sense of consent to bodily disposal, permitting such voluntary donations; other countries such as France and the United Kingdom have stricter regulations.

In the book's final chapter, Rosenbloom discusses anthropodermic books that are kept in private collections, rather than museums as in most confirmed cases. PMF testing of privately held books has generally discovered them to be fakes, but Rosenbloom and her colleagues speculate that French collectors in particular may hold more genuine examples. France's strict laws around possession and sale of human remains disincentivize making such books public or holding them in library collections, but reference works on French book collecting imply many anthropodermic books have been held in secret. The last genuine anthropodermic book discussed in Dark Archives is a private collector's copy of "The Gold-Bug", Edgar Allan Poe's breakthrough novelette, thought to be once owned by John Steinbeck.

== Research and publication ==
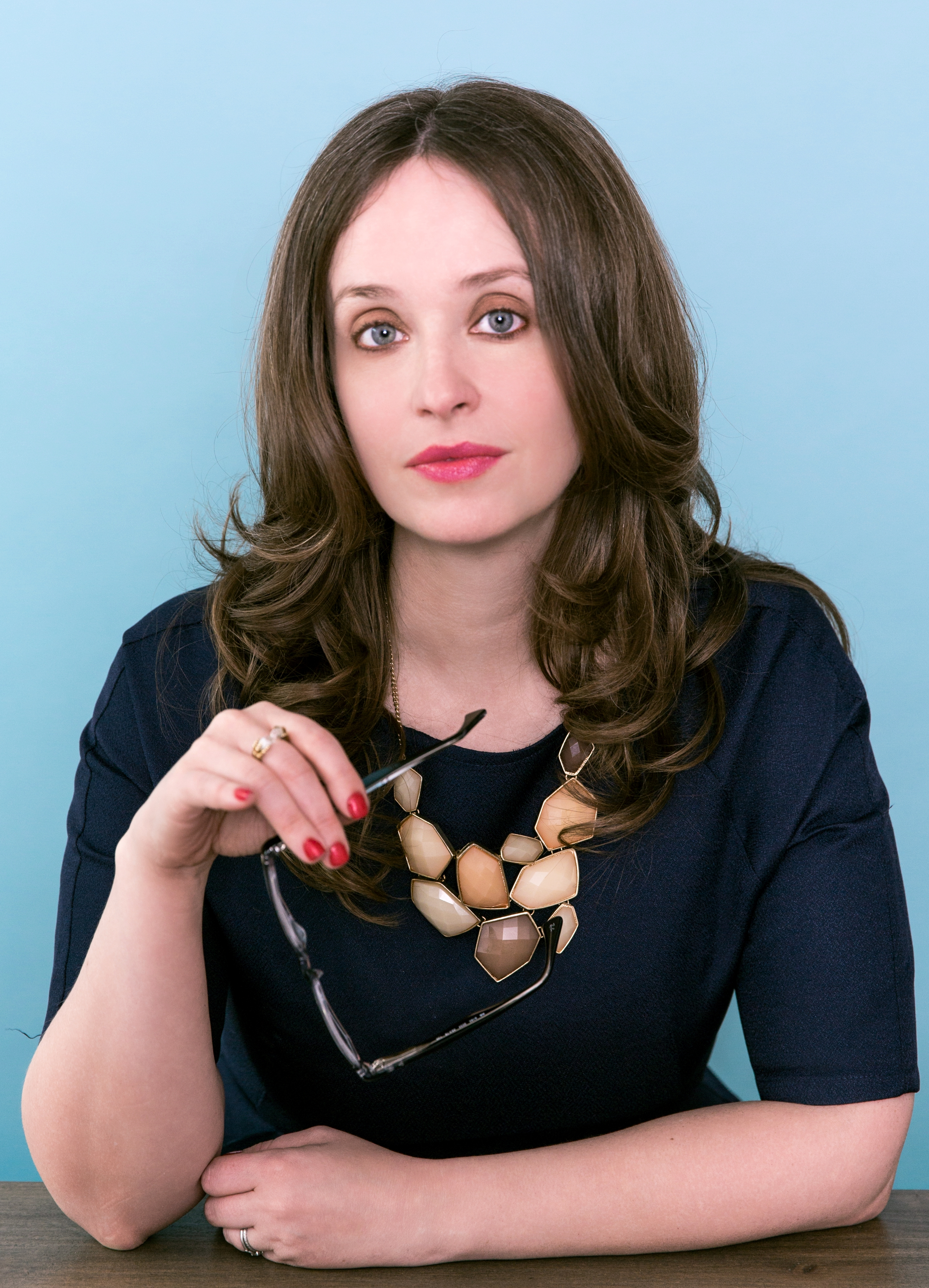
Megan Rosenbloom in 2016

Rosenbloom spent six years researching Dark Archives, during which time she visited literary archives and private collectors across Europe and America. Her research was not only oriented around the books themselves, but also the process and logistics of making them. To this end, Rosenbloom visited a tannery to discover more about the process of leatherworking; much of a chapter is dedicated to a description of its physicality, including the intense smell and the gore-ridden environment.

Librarians, archivists, and other researchers were interviewed for Dark Archives. Some of these figures disagreed with Rosenbloom's attitude towards books bound in human skin, including Paul Needham, then the head librarian of the Scheide Library at Princeton University. Needham debated with Rosenbloom the ethics of keeping anthropodermic books, arguing that such bindings should be removed and subject to cremation or burial. Rosenbloom, who takes a more positive attitude towards the restoration of anthropodermic books, reproduced such opinions in Dark Archives but disagreed with them. Reviewers commented that this perspective, marked by "a balance of academic interest and awe", was influenced by her philosophical affiliation with open discussion of death and perspective that anthropodermic books have substantial historic and philosophical value.

The book presents biographies of several figures discussed in it, such as John Stockton Hough, the physician who bound the three anthropodermic books at the Mütter Museum. Hough was a 19th-century physician noted for designing a vaginal-rectal speculum and for curating the first known catalogue of medical incunabula. A book collector, Hough took the skin of an impoverished young Irish émigré named Mary Lynch at her autopsy, using it to bind several significant publications on reproduction and gynecology. The Los Angeles Review of Books discussed Rosenbloom's level of research into the figures around anthropodermic bibliopegy, describing it as humanizing objects that are otherwise treated as "grotesque curiosities".

Dark Archives was agented by Anna Sproul-Latimer at Neon Literary and published through Farrar, Straus and Giroux, an imprint of Macmillan Publishers, in October 2020. It is 288 pages long.

== Reception ==
Dark Archives's reception discussed the depth of Rosenbloom's research, the accessible writing style, and the passion she demonstrated for the history and preservation of rare books. Her intellectual and ideological stances were the focus of some reviews, earning both praise and criticism for the lens through which she approached the topic of books bound in human skin.

=== Scholarship ===
The book was praised by reviewers for its depth of scholarship and its reckoning with ethical issues. Christine Jacobson, a curator at the Houghton Library, reviewed Dark Archives for the Los Angeles Review of Books. Working from her own experience as one of the curators involved in the maintenance of an anthropodermic book, Jacobson praised Rosenbloom's "curiosity and empathy" while highlighting the bioethical considerations she raised. James Hamblin, a journalist and physician specializing in public health, featured the book's debunking of myths around anthropodermic bibliopegy in his review for The New York Times. He expanded upon the recency of the "era of consent in medicine" and the long history of patient exploitation, complimenting Rosenbloom's efforts to "compel [doctors] to reckon with that arc, and to try to bend it more urgently in an ethical direction".

Megan Nance, medical librarian at the Harvey Cushing/John Hay Whitney Medical Library at Yale University, reviewed the book positively in the Journal of the Medical Library Association. She commented on Rosenbloom's efforts to identify the people whose skin was used for anthropodermic bibliopegy, as well as the "bold line connecting the absence of empathy in the early medical profession and medical exploitation" she drew. A reviewer for the journal Cultural Geographies praised Dark Archives, but desired it apply more of a critical theory lens. Diane Dias De Fazio, editor of RBM: A Journal of Rare Books, Manuscripts, and Cultural Heritage, described it as written for a "general, albeit bookish, audience". She both praised and criticised its bibliographic scholarship, stating that most audiences would appreciate its broad overview of the subject, but special collections experts were likely to find it too brief.

=== Aesthetic and philosophy ===
The writing style, aesthetic sensibility, and philosophical leans of Dark Archives attracted attention from reviewers. NPR deemed the book a "titillating Halloween read" that combined "bloody thrills with historical fact and ethical nuance", but criticised the in-depth discussion of the legal status of corpses as overly dry and "one of the few moments where Rosenbloom loses sight of her readership". Publishers Weekly described the book's prose as "conversational" and possessing an "obvious excitement at the thrill of the chase", serving as a counter to the less-approachable subject matter.

Sheilah Ayers at the University of Lethbridge wrote in the Canadian Journal of Academic Librarianship that Dark Archives was "accessible, engaging, and incredibly intriguing", but highlighted how Rosenbloom's death-positive stance reached the point of being "arguably pro-books bound in human skin". She discussed how the work was able to recruit and represent several points of view on the topic while still focusing on its author's, and argued that this was a positive, as it prevented tonal inconsistency or undermining Rosenbloom's credentials.

Carolyn Sullivan at Emerging Library & Information Perspectives wrote a generally positive review, particularly taking note of the book's substantial bibliography and diversity of research sources, but warned that readers may be "divided" on the appropriateness of its relatively casual style. She referred to the example of Needham's perspective on anthropodermic books, stating that readers who took perspectives closer to Needham's than Rosenbloom's were likely to find the style overly cavalier. Sullivan argued that Rosenbloom's "appreciation" for the subject matter dominated the work, alienating it from more sensitive readers, and instead recommended the author's appearance on the science podcast Ologies for a "less emotionally freighted introduction" to the history of books bound in human skin.

=== Recommendations ===
Several outlets included Dark Archives in their seasonal or annual book recommendations. Shortly after the book's release, The Week recommended it for fans of true crime, and Wired described it as an unexpected "delight" that "manages to be life-affirming amidst all the ethical debate and stinky tannery mishaps". The New York Times incorporated Hamblin's review in their November 2020 compilation of recommendations, alongside books such as Barack Obama's memoir A Promised Land, Pamela Sneed's poetry collection Funeral Diva, and the National Book Award Science + Literature-winning Blockchain Chicken Farm. Library Journal recommended the book as "essential" for libraries to stock in their collections, especially those where books on medical history were popular.

== See also ==
- Dark academia
- Danse Macabre
- List of books bound in human skin
