= Blockchain Chicken Farm =

2020 book by Xiaowei Wang

- Author: Xiaowei Wang
- Publisher: FSG Originals x Logic
- Publication date: 13 October 2020
- Pages: 256
- ISBN: 978-0-374-53866-8
- Dewey Decimal: 609.51

Blockchain Chicken Farm: And Other Stories of Tech in China's Countryside is a 2020 non-fiction book by Xiaowei Wang, a Chinese-American artist, writer, and software engineer. The book explores the impact of technology on rural China, especially in relation to agriculture and food safety. It consists of several vignettes that illustrate how technology is used and adapted in rural China, both by individuals and by urban corporations, and how this impacts global society.

Over the course of the book, Wang travels across China to visit places such as a "blockchain chicken farm" where chickens are tracked by QR codes to certify their free range status, a pearl farming village that exports pearls to US-based multi-level marketing companies, and a Halloween costume factory run by the e-commerce giant Taobao based in a small town. Wang conducted their research over the late 2010s, motivated by the desire to address their own biases in favour of urban areas.

Blockchain Chicken Farm was published by FSG Originals x Logic, a collaboration between Farrar, Straus and Giroux and the technology magazine Logic. The book received widespread attention from critics following its release, being featured on several recommendations lists and awarded the National Book Foundation's 2023 Science + Literature prize. It was also commended for its nuance, detail, and unique perspective on technology and society. Though reception trended positive, some reviewers criticized the book for its lack of a clear thesis, its superficiality, or its misrepresentation of some concepts.

== Background ==
China has rapidly industrialized since the mid to late twentieth century. One consequence is the emergence of substantial income inequality between China's urban and rural regions; inequality peaked in 2009, with a per capita income in urban areas thrice that of rural areas, and has since stabilized. A distinctive feature of Chinese internal migration is the hukou system, a form of household registration where people are assigned a "rural" or "urban" status based on the circumstances of their birth; the location of one's hukou determines eligibility for services such as schools, hospitals, pensions, housing, and employment in an area. Due to the difficulties in changing one's hukou, many migrants from rural to urban China lack access to such services in their place of residence. Though the hukou system has been reformed multiple times, it remains strict.

Food safety is a widespread concern in China, spurred by numerous high-profile controversies regarding contaminated or misrepresented food. To serve China's rapidly growing urban middle class, who increase the country's demand both for meat and for higher-quality food, farmers and companies have attempted technological solutions to guarantee their products' freshness and safety. This includes the eponymous "blockchain chicken farms", where chickens are tracked by QR code to certify their free range status and sold at a premium.

Xiaowei Wang is a Chinese-American artist, writer, and software engineer with a Ph.D. in geography from the University of California, Berkeley. Blockchain Chicken Farm is their first book. Wang was inspired to investigate technology in rural China as a critique of "metronormativity", a term defined by Jack Halberstam as a disproportionate focus on urban environments motivated by a stigma against rural cultures and societies.

== Synopsis ==
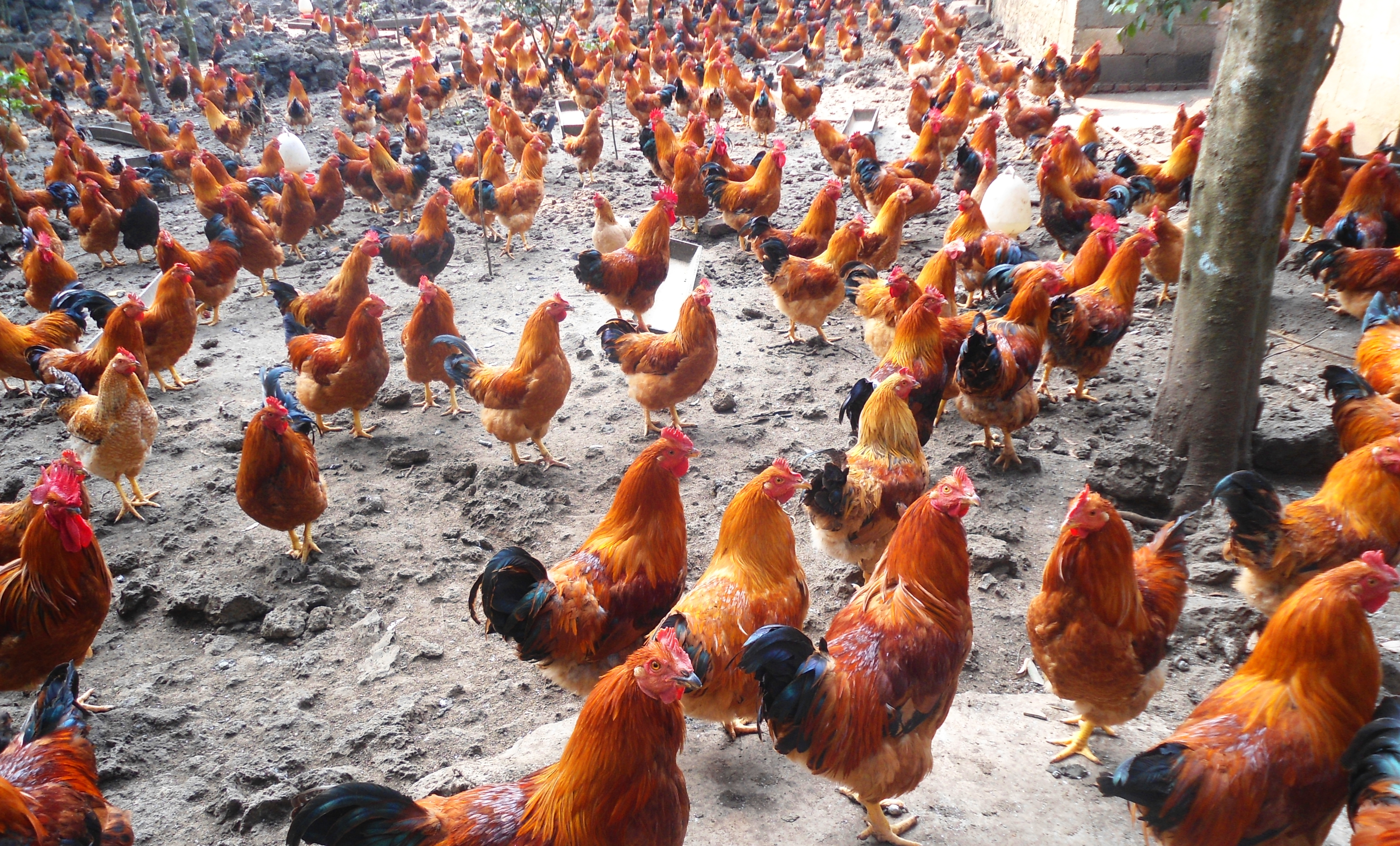
A chicken farm in Hainan

Blockchain Chicken Farm focuses on the impact of technology in rural China, particularly as it relates to agriculture. The first major focus of the book is the "blockchain chicken farms" run by Bubuji (Chinese: 步步鸡), also known as GoGoChicken, a subsidiary of the technology arm of ZhongAn, China's largest insurance company. Wang visits a farm in Guizhou owned by Jiang, a farmer who turned to GoGoChicken after sales for his free range chickens declined due to distrust of their provenance. In Wang's discussions with Jiang and Ren, a local government employee, they discover the people involved with the project have little understanding of what technology underpins it. Though the blockchain chickens are profitable, selling for up to CN¥ 300 (US$43) to a market of upper-middle-class consumers, Jiang's enterprise sales dry up shortly after the first order, raising concerns about their long-term viability.

The book then addresses the African swine fever outbreak of the late 2010s, which killed a substantial share of pigs in China, the world's largest pork producer. African swine fever had never been reported in China prior to 2018, and is a difficult disease to eradicate; pigs that survive infection remain carriers for the rest of their life, and exported pork products are able to spread the disease internationally. Wang ascribes the ASF outbreak to industrialized pig farming. The most nutritionally optimal pig swill is cannibalistic, feeding pork products to pigs themselves, which creates vectors for ASF to spread from infected to uninfected pigs. Wang states that the practice of "optimizing" farming allows for such externalities to occur and worsen.

Wang then addresses the role of artificial intelligence in the workforce. Inspired by a discussion with a stranger on a train to Shanghai, Wang argues that religion in China is seeing a resurgence as a reaction to increasing social alienation driven by technology. They posit that the ideal purpose of AI in the workforce is not to "take" jobs from humans, but to collaborate with humans in their existing jobs, giving the example of an AI aiding doctors in diagnosis versus one replacing a social worker who supports patients.

Blockchain Chicken Farm's next section discusses China's urban–rural education gap. The book relates the Chinese government's attempts to improve educational standards in rural areas, where very few students complete high school or attend university. Wang meets Sun Wei, a young man who works in a gig economy-like role as a drone operator, and contrasts his career expectations both with gig economy employees in the West and with his peers with higher educational achievements. They argue that Sun Wei is less marginalized or alienated as an employee than true gig economy employees, given his passion for his work, but that his role is relatively peripheral compared to that of a more traditionally credentialed employee.

The last chapters address subjects such as Chinese manufacturing, mass surveillance, and discrimination against ethnic minorities in China. At the close of the book, Wang travels to rural Zhejiang, the centre of the country's massive pearl farming industry. They analyse the international nature of Zhejiang's pearl industry, which exports a substantial number of pearls to US-based multi-level marketing companies. In the United States, these pearls are distributed to influencers who host livestreamed "pearl parties", shucking oysters to see the pearls that come out. Wang discusses the economic position of people involved in multi-level marketing, noting that the states with the highest proportion of direct sellers, North Dakota, Iowa, and Wyoming, all have above-average unemployment rates.

The chapters of Blockchain Chicken Farm are interspersed with recipes. These recipes use an intentionally science-fiction styling. The first, a porridge with goji berries, is described as food for a hypothetical artificial intelligence that needed to eat to survive; the second is inspired by DNA digital data storage, using tofu fritters as an analogy to the process of storing DNA on soybeans; and the third, a recipe for mooncakes, is styled as a meal prepared from moon-grown ingredients, with the cornmeal custard filling presented as made from corn grown on the Moon.

== Research ==
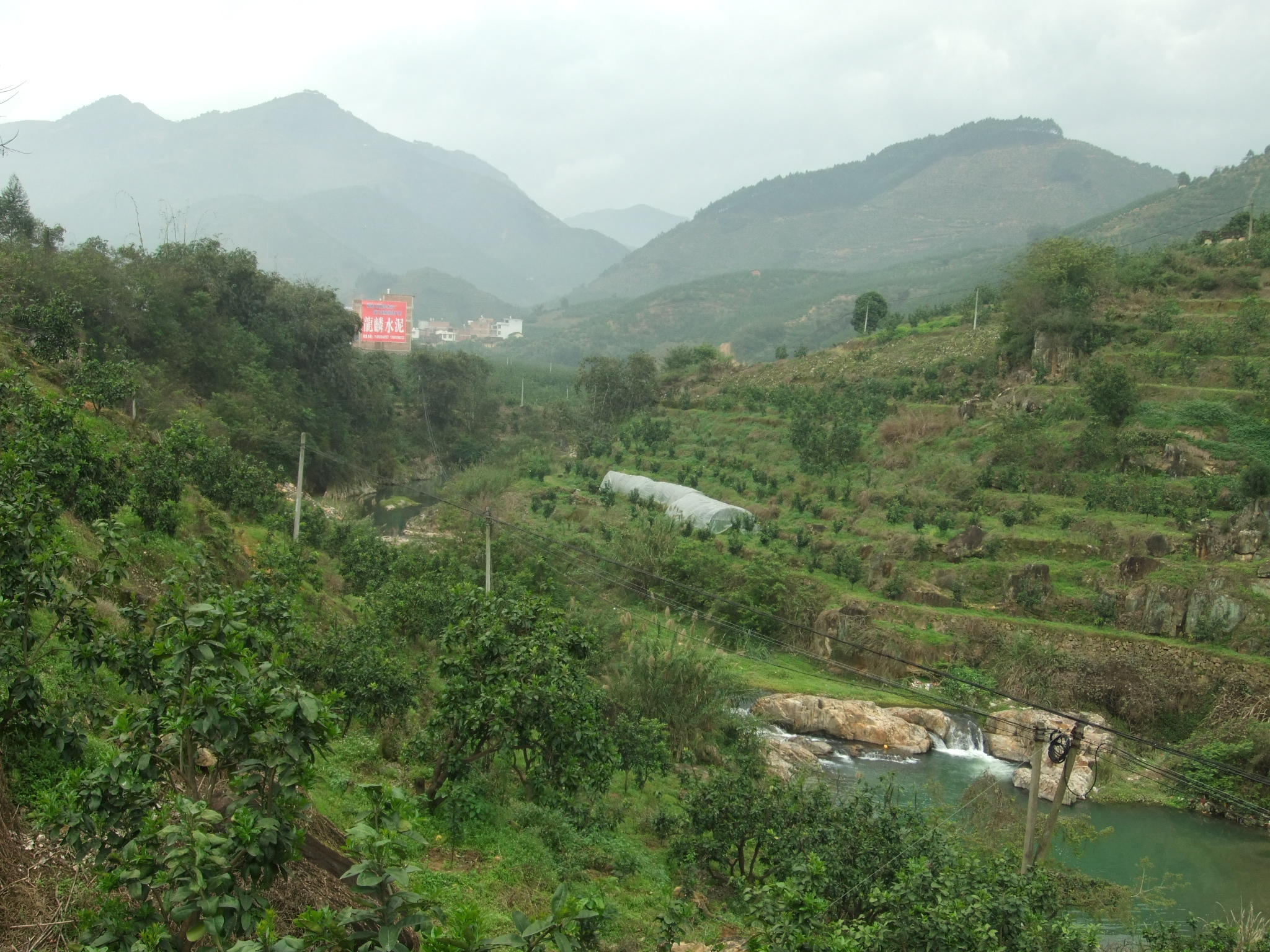
Landscape near Xiaoxi, Fujian, in Pinghe County

The research for Blockchain Chicken Farm mostly occurred from 2016 to 2018, though it continued through to the emergence of the COVID-19 pandemic. Wang travelled to various districts of rural China, such as Dinglou in Pinghe County, where the e-commerce retailer Taobao had created economic incentives to centralize Halloween costume production, and rural Zhejiang, a centre of pearl farming, where pearls were shipped to international multi-level marketing companies. A particular focus of the book is the eponymous "blockchain chicken farm", a farm in Guizhou in southwestern China where the smallholder farmer had been unable to convince purchasers that his chickens were genuinely free-range. GoGoChicken, a Shanghai-based company, recruited him to a blockchain-based surveillance scheme where the chickens were monitored to guarantee their status.

The primary driver behind most technological applications Wang discusses is the desire to improve food safety standards or confirm their enforcement; due to several high-profile Chinese controversies around food safety, the subject is of substantial concern to the nation's emerging urban middle class. Simultaneously, being able to technologically prove that a given farm has high standards provides an incentive to source products from that farm, potentially improving the financial state of the farmer. Similarly, the book discusses how technological responses to food safety problems can backfire. Wang refers to the example of the ET Agricultural Brain, an Alibaba Group initiative to optimize pig farming. The AI model allowed for rapid large-scale industrialization of pig farms across the country, increasing output but contributing to the African swine fever outbreak that killed millions of pigs in the late 2010s. ET Agricultural Brain was repurposed to monitor at-risk herds in an attempt to combat the outbreak, which was focused on by media reports significantly more than the role it played in its genesis.

== Publication and reception ==
Blockchain Chicken Farm was published 13 October 2020 by FSG Originals x Logic, a collaboration between Farrar, Straus and Giroux (an imprint of Macmillan Publishers) and the technology magazine Logic, for which Wang was formerly an editor. FSG Originals x Logic was a short-term collaboration to publish four books on the role of technology in contemporary society; alongside Blockchain Chicken Farm, it published Voices from the Valley by Ben Tarnoff and Moira Weigel, What Tech Calls Thinking by Adrian Daub, and Subprime Attention Crisis by Tim Hwang.

Upon release, the book received widespread attention. Kirkus gave it a starred review, a privilege afforded to the top 10% of traditionally published books it reviews each year, and praised the "flair" with which it approached its subject matter. Peter Gordon, editor of the Asian Review of Books, joked that "[i]f there were an award for the best book title, Blockchain Chicken Farm would surely be in [the] running for 2020". He went on to deem the book "eminently readable" and remarked on how, unlike conventional "China books" that focused on travelogues or attempt to explain China to a Western audience, Blockchain Chicken Farm was primarily focused on the future of technology and simply felt its "most important signposts" were Chinese rather than Western. Ling Ma similarly wrote in Wired that she "can't think of any other recent work that comes close to capturing the alternate reality that is China today", stating Blockchain Chicken Farm exemplified the nature and pace of Chinese technological advancement to the point of being reminiscent of science fiction. Allison Arieff, print editorial director for the MIT Technology Review, reviewed Blockchain Chicken Farm for the San Francisco Chronicle. She praised the book for its avoidance of polemicism, comparing it flatteringly to what she considered a general trend towards polarization in books by authors with backgrounds in the technology industry. Similar acclaim for the work's nuance came from The Nation and the New York Times.

More mixed reviews included one by Publishers Weekly, whose staff writer described Blockchain Chicken Farm as "thought-provoking if inconclusive", praising its detail and unique subject matter but criticising its absence of a clear thesis. The digital anthropologist Gabriele de Seta wrote an overall positive review of Blockchain Chicken Farm in Asiascape: Digital Asia, but felt its breadth of coverage "necessarily leaves some topics undeveloped and others undertheorized"; he proffered the examples of Wang's "detour" into Chinese livestreaming culture and their superficial handling of the concept of shanzhai (counterfeit or copycat products). Jaime Chu, editor of Spike Art Magazine, denounced the book in The Baffler as "essentially an Eat, Pray, AI memoir". She criticised the "superficiality" of Wang's research on several levels, including their dismissal of Xinjiang, their lack of engagement with the hukou system that limits social and geographical mobility, and their sparse engagement with the historical context surrounding Chinese modernization policy. Chu particularly focused on the same loose interpretation of shanzhai as de Seta, arguing that Wang misrepresented the concept to make it more amenable to free and open-source software culture. She ultimately deemed Blockchain Chicken Farm "built on analogies as intellectual labor-saving shortcuts" and insufficient as any of memoir, technology reporting, or "speculative manifesto".

Amongst academics, Sunil Mani, director and Reserve Bank of India Chair of the Centre for Development Studies in Kerala, addressed the book from a food science-focused perspective in the Review of Agrarian Studies. While he noted its "non-use of quantitative data and methods of analysis", he nonetheless commended its "nuanced understanding" of the application of emerging technologies to an agricultural society. Melody Jue, associate professor of English at the University of California, Santa Barbara, covered it alongside AI in the Wild by Peter Dauvergne and A City Is Not a Computer by Shannon Mattern for American Literature. She held up Blockchain Chicken Farm as one of extremely few books addressing artificial intelligence from the perspective of the Global South, juxtaposing its "more complex story of technology and agency" with that of works that treat developing countries and regions as "passive subject[s] of ecological damage".

Blockchain Chicken Farm was included on several recommendations lists. The New York Times featured it alongside Barack Obama's memoir A Promised Land and Dark Archives, an exploration of books bound in human skin by Megan Rosenbloom. Literary Hub incorporated it in its "science, technology, and nature" recommendations for October 2020 amongst Kindred: Neanderthal Life, Love, Death and Art by Rebecca Wragg Sykes and A Good Time to Be Born by Perri Klass. The Verge's 2023 reader-inspired list of "the best tech books of all time" featured Blockchain Chicken Farm, as well as Masters of Doom by David Kushner, The Inevitable by Kevin Kelly, and Hackers: Heroes of the Computer Revolution by Steven Levy. Blockchain Chicken Farm was awarded the National Book Foundation's 2023 Science + Literature prize, a $10,000 award, alongside Real Life by Brandon Taylor.
