= Destinies of the Soul =

1879 book, formerly bound in human skin

Destinies of the Soul (published in French as Des destinées de l'âme) is an individual copy of Arsene Houssaye's essay Des destinés de l'âme notable for being bound in human skin. The book was written by Arsène Houssaye and published by Calmann-Lévy in Paris. A copy of the book was owned by the physician Dr. Ludovic Bouland before it was acquired by the Harvard Library in 1934. The book was not confirmed to be bound in human skin until 2014. In 2024, Harvard University removed the skin and placed it in storage due to ethical considerations.

== History ==
Houssaye was friends with Bouland and gifted him a copy of the book. The book was not bound in human skin until its acquisition by Bouland, who believed that "a book about the human soul deserved to have a human covering". He used the skin of a deceased woman in a French psychiatric hospital, where he was a medical student. After his death in 1934, it was acquired by Harvard University, although not formally so until 1954. The book entered the collection alongside a note detailing its origins and instructions for how to preserve human skin.

In 2014, when researchers were able to confirm that the material used was indeed human skin, Harvard said it was "good news for fans of anthropodermic bibliopegy, bibliomaniacs and cannibals alike". The advent of peptide mass fingerprinting made such a confirmation possible, as it allowed researchers to distinguish human skin from other materials like sheepskin. Destinies of the Soul was one of three books tested by the university for human skin and was the only one to have it. In 2023, Harvard performed an ethical review of materials within its collection and concluded that it had failed in its stewardship responsibilities. This review was prompted by a 2022 report about human remains within the university's possession. Before this ethical review, access to the book was unrestricted and it was possibly used in hazing rituals. As of 2024, Harvard University has removed the human skin from the book and placed it in storage as a temporary measure before disposal.

== See also ==
- List of books bound in human skin
- Dark Archives
