= Lawrence S. Thompson =

American librarian (1916–1986)

Lawrence Sidney Thompson (1916–1986) was an American librarian. He was Director of Libraries and a faculty member in the classics department at the University of Kentucky from 1948 to 1963. He wrote extensively on the processes of printing and publication and researched processes for cataloging materials, frequently corresponding with European colleagues. He was an advocate for the use of microforms in research library collections.

Thompson earned an A.B. from the University of North Carolina in 1934 (Phi Beta Kappa), an A.M. from the University of Chicago in 1935, and a Ph.D. from the University of North Carolina in 1938. His dissertation was titled "Wilhelm Waiblinger's Interpretation of Italy." He earned the A.B.L.S. (Bachelor of Arts in Library Science) from the University of Michigan in 1940.

Thompson was the author of Human Skin, a paper on Anthropodermic bibliopegy.

Thompson died in 1986.

== Selected publications ==
- Thompson, Lawrence S. (1953), Wilhelm Waiblinger in Italy, Chapel Hill: University of North Carolina Press
- Thompson, L. S. (1954). "Hand Bookbinding in the United States since the Civil War". Libri: International Journal of Libraries & Information Services. 5 (2): 97–121.
- Thompson, Lawrence S. (1955). Kurze Geschichte der Handbuchbinderei in den Vereinigten Staaten von Amerika. Meister und Meisterwerke der Buchbinderkunst (in German). Vol. 3. Stuttgart: Max Hettler.
- Woodbridge, Hensley C.; Thompson, Lawrence S. (1962). Printing in Colonial Spanish America. Hamden, CT: Shoe String Press.
- Thompson, Lawrence S., ed. (1974). Norse Mythology: The Elder Edda in Prose Translation. Hamden, CT: Archon Books. ISBN 0-208-01394-6.
- Thompson, Lawrence S. (1976). A Bibliography of Dissertations in Classical Studies: American, 1964–1972; British, 1950–1972; with a Cumulative Index, 1861–1972. Hamden, CT: Shoe String Press.
- Thompson, Lawrence S. (1974–1984). The New Sabin: Books Described by Joseph Sabin and His Successors, Now Described Again on the Basis of Examination of Originals and Fully Indexed by Title, Subject, Joint Authors and Institutions and Agencies. Vol. 10 vols. Troy, NY: Whitston.
