= Anthropodermic bibliopegy =

Practice of binding books in human skin

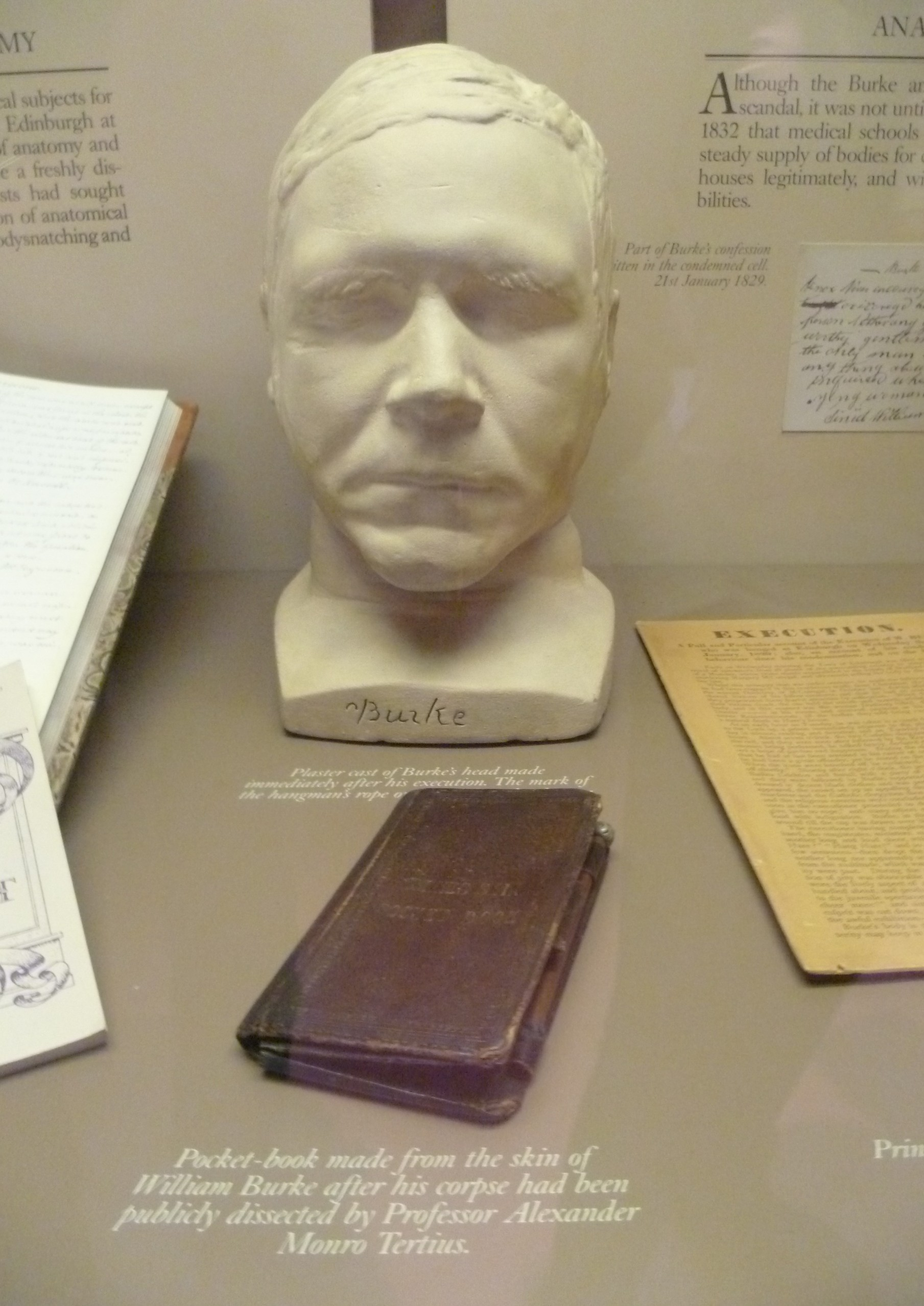
A book bound in the skin of the murderer William Burke, on display in Surgeons' Hall Museum in Edinburgh

Anthropodermic bibliopegy is the practice of binding books in human skin. As of April 2022, The Anthropodermic Book Project has examined 31 out of 50 books in public institutions supposed to have anthropodermic bindings, of which 18 have been confirmed as human and 13 have been demonstrated to be non-human leather instead.

== Etymology ==
Bibliopegy (/ˌbɪbliˈɒpɪdʒi/ BIB-lee-OP-i-jee) is a rare (Note: The Oxford English Dictionary places it in Frequency Band 2, for 'words which occur fewer than 0.01 times per million words in typical modern English usage. These are almost exclusively terms which are not part of normal discourse and would be unknown to most people. Many are technical terms from specialized discourses.') synonym for 'bookbinding'. It combines the Ancient Greek βιβλίον (biblion, "book") and πηγία (pegia, from pegnynai, "to fasten"). The earliest reference in the Oxford English Dictionary dates from 1876; Merriam-Webster gives the date of first use as c. 1859 and the OED records an instance of 'bibliopegist' for a bookbinder from 1824.

Anthropodermic (/ˌænθroʊpəˈdɜːrmɪk/ AN-throh-pə-DUR-mik), combining the Ancient Greek ἄνθρωπος (anthropos, "man" or "human") and δέρμα (derma, "skin"), does not appear in the Oxford English Dictionary and seems to be unused in contexts other than bookbinding. The phrase "anthropodermic bibliopegy" has been used at least since Lawrence S. Thompson's article on the subject, published in 1946. The practice of binding a book in the skin of its author – as with The Highwayman – has been called 'autoanthropodermic bibliopegy' (from αὐτός, autos, meaning "self").

== History ==
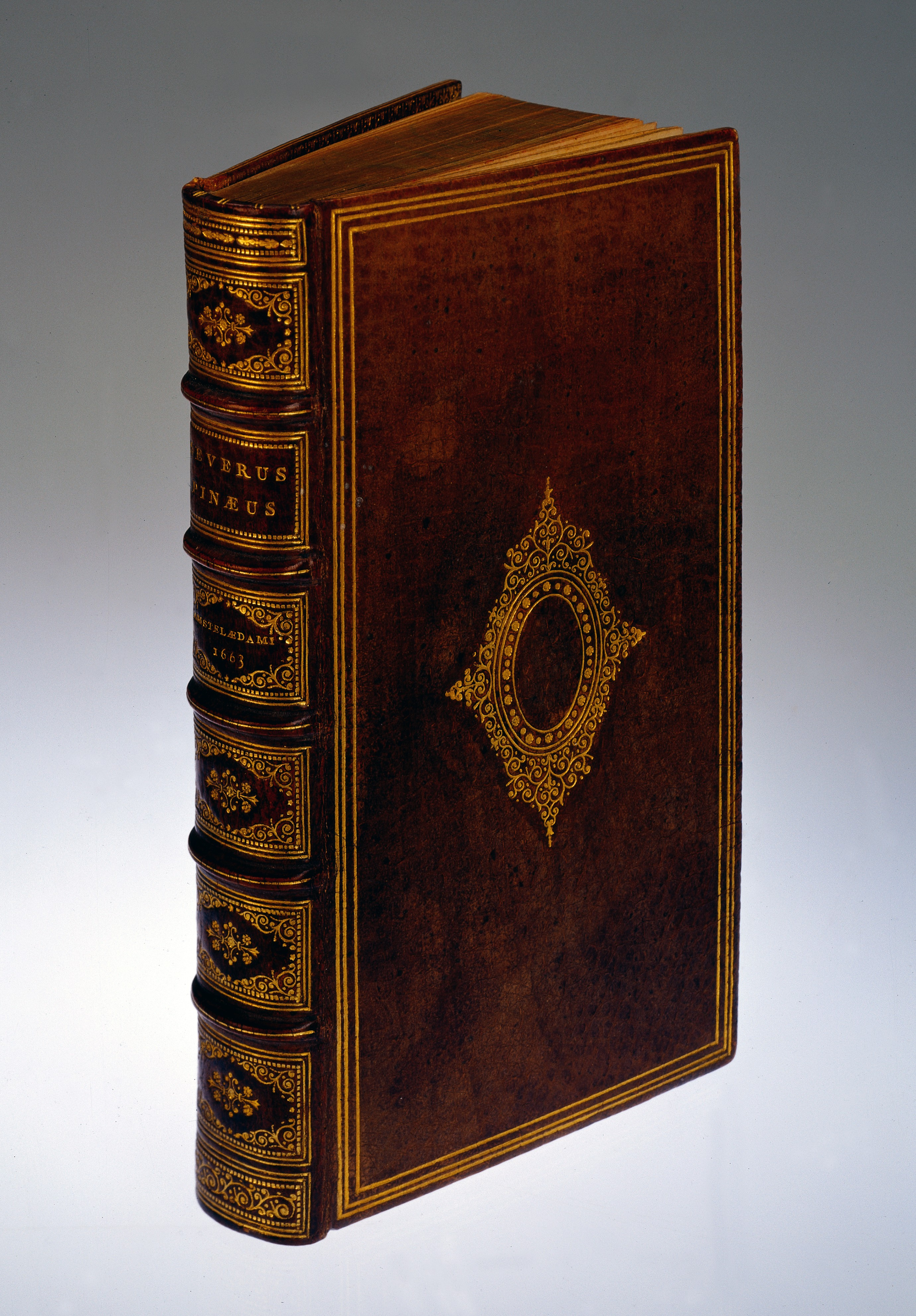
A 17th-century book on female virginity at the Wellcome Library, rebound in human skin by Dr. Ludovic Bouland around 1865

An early reference to a book bound in human skin is found in the travels of Zacharias Conrad von Uffenbach. Writing about his visit to Bremen in 1710:

(We also saw a little duodecimo, Molleri manuale præparationis ad mortem. There seemed to be nothing remarkable about it, and you couldn't understand why it was here until you read in the front that it was bound in human leather. This unusual binding, the like of which I had never before seen, seemed especially well adapted to this book, dedicated to more meditation about death. You would take it for pig skin.)

— translated by Lawrence S. Thompson, Religatum de Pelle Humana

During the French Revolution, there were rumours that a tannery for human skin had been established at Meudon outside Paris. The Carnavalet Museum owns a volume containing the French Constitution of 1793 and Declaration of the Rights of Man and of the Citizen described as "passing for being made in human skin imitating calf".

The majority of well-attested anthropodermic bindings date from the 19th century.

== Examples ==
Possible human skin binding in the Smithsonian Libraries

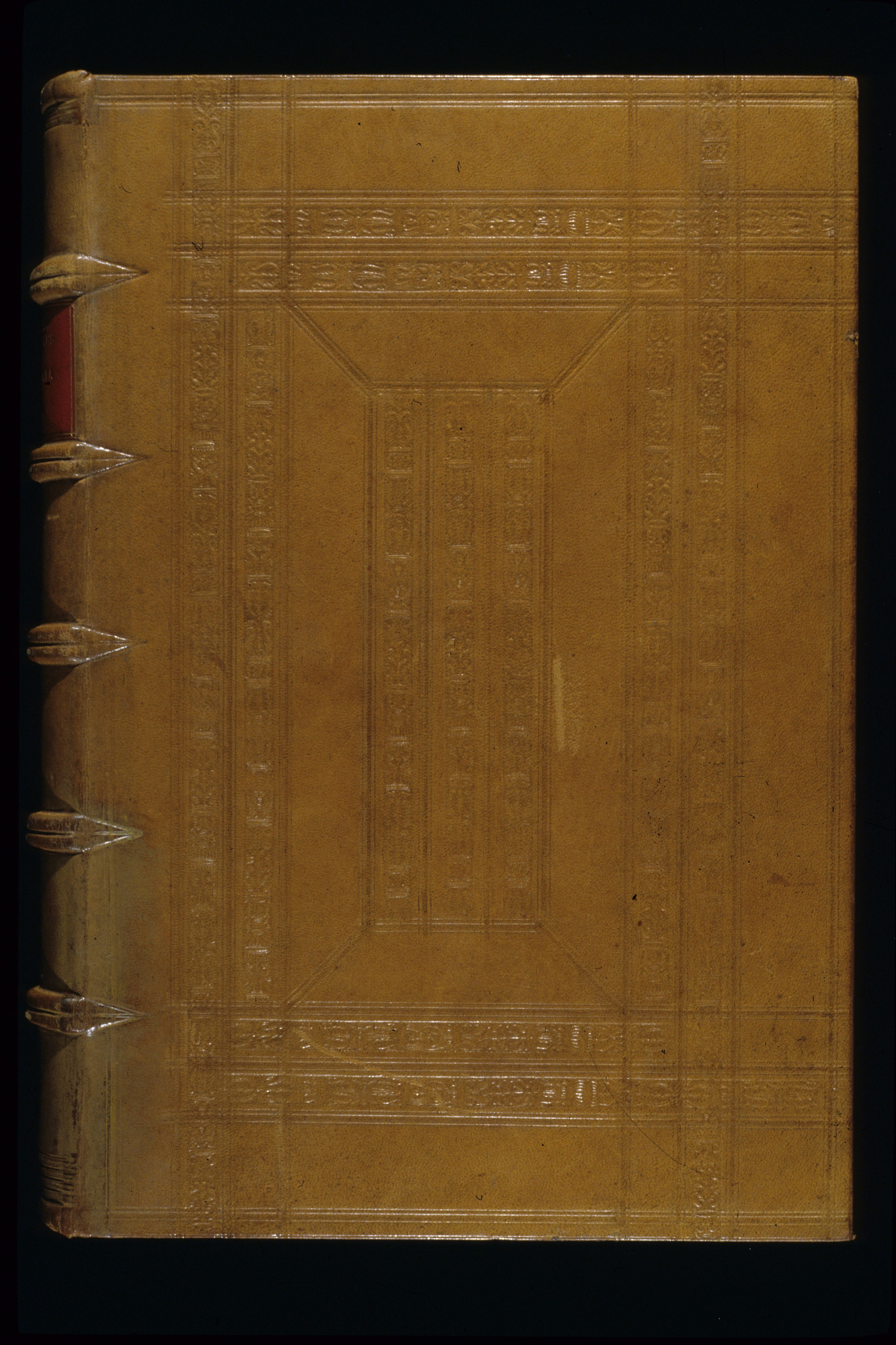
Bound in 1863 by Josse Schavye, the same binder of the genuine anthropodermic Vesalius' De Humani Corporis Fabrica in Brown University, and who bound at least four books with human leather in his lifetime.

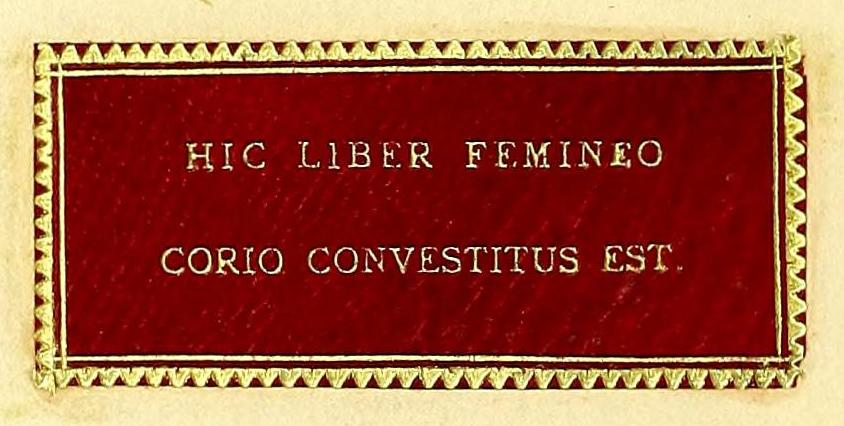
Panel with Latin inscription in the book: Hic liber femineo corio convestitus est ("This book has been bound with the skin of a woman")

=== Criminals ===
Surviving examples of human skin bindings have often been commissioned, performed, or collected by medical doctors, who have access to cadavers, sometimes those of executed criminals, such as the case of John Horwood in 1821 and William Corder in 1828. The Royal College of Surgeons of Edinburgh preserves a notebook bound in the skin of the murderer William Burke after his execution and subsequent public dissection by Professor Alexander Monro in 1829.

What Lawrence Thompson called "the most famous of all anthropodermic bindings" is exhibited at the Boston Athenaeum, titled The Highwayman: Narrative of the Life of James Allen alias George Walton. It is by James Allen, who made his deathbed confession in prison in 1837 and asked for a copy bound in his own skin to be presented to a man he once tried to rob and admired for his bravery, and another one for his doctor. Once he died, a piece of his back was taken to a tannery and utilized for the book.

=== Dance of Death ===
An exhibition of fine bindings at the Grolier Club in 1903 included, in a section of 'Bindings in Curious Materials', three editions of Holbein's 'Dance of Death' in 19th-century human skin bindings; two of these belong to the John Hay Library at Brown University. Other examples of the Dance of Death include an 1856 edition offered at auction by Leonard Smithers in 1895 and an 1842 edition from the personal library of Florin Abelès was offered at auction by Piasa of Paris in 2006. Bookbinder Edward Hertzberg describes the Monastery Hill Bindery having been approached by "[a]n Army Surgeon ... with a copy of Holbein's Dance of Death with the request that we bind it in a piece of human skin, which he brought along."

=== Other examples ===
Another tradition, with less supporting evidence, is that books of erotica have been bound in human skin.

A female admirer of the French astronomer Camille Flammarion supposedly bequeathed her skin to bind one of his books. At Flammarion's observatory, there is a copy of his La pluralité des mondes habités on which is stamped reliure en peau humaine 1880 ("human skin binding, 1880"). This story is sometimes told instead about Les terres du ciel and the donor named as the Comtesse de Saint-Ange.

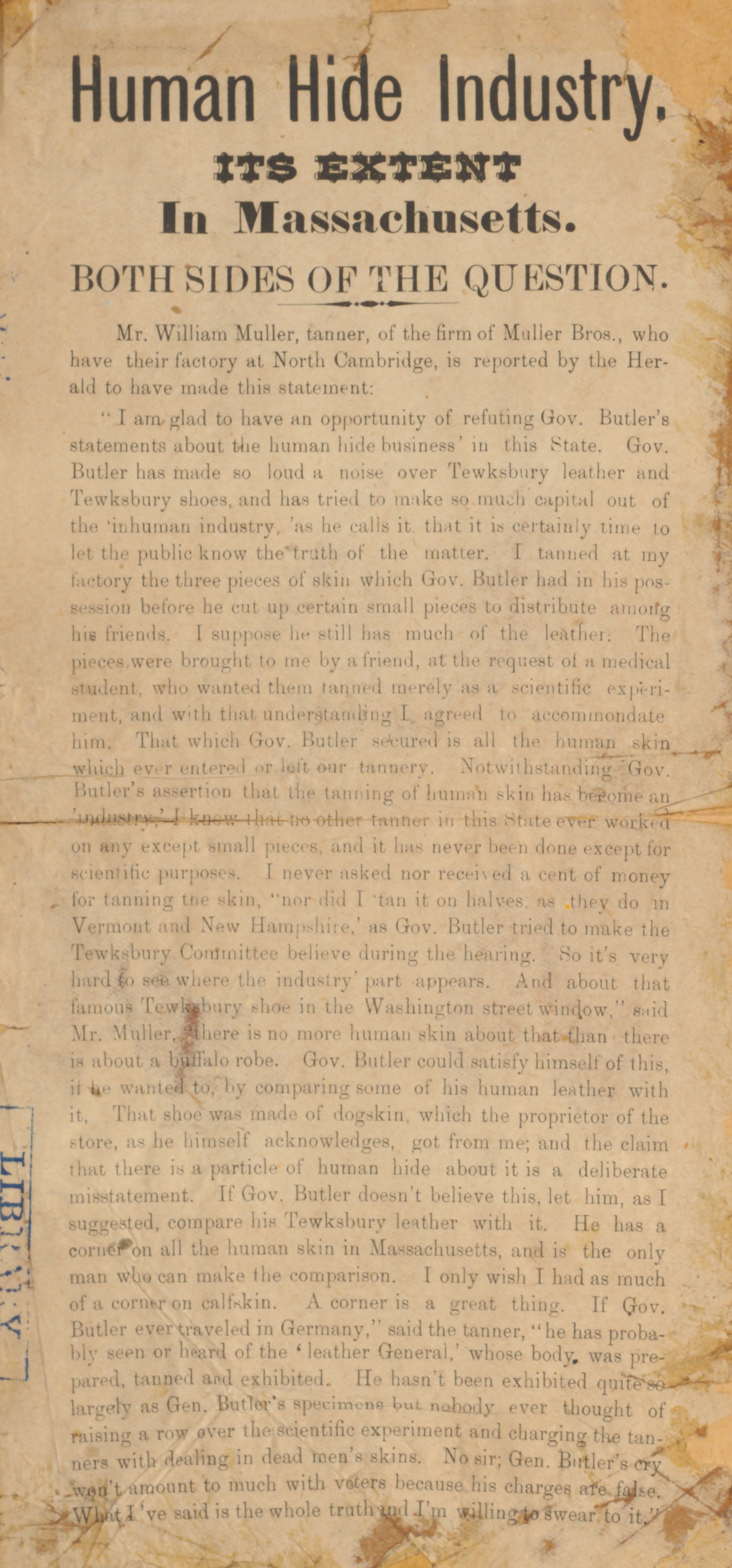
Human Hide Industry - Its Extent in Massachusetts - Both Sides of the Question, 1883 document from the U.S. National Library of Medicine collection

The Newberry Library in Chicago owns an Arabic manuscript written in 1848, with a handwritten note that it is bound in human skin, though "it is the opinion of the conservation staff that the binding material is not human skin, but rather highly burnished goat". This book is mentioned in the novel The Time Traveler's Wife, much of which is set in the Newberry.

The National Library of Australia holds a 19th-century poetry book with the inscription "Bound in human skin" on the first page. The binding was performed 'before 1890' and mistakenly identified as human skin by pathologists in 1992. In August 2025, the University of Sydney used mass spectrometry to confirm the book was not bound in human skin, but likely bound in sheepskin.

A portion of the binding in the copy of Dale Carnegie's Lincoln the Unknown that is part of Temple University's Charles L. Blockson Collection was "taken from the skin of a Negro at a Baltimore Hospital and tanned by the Jewell Belting Company".

== Identification ==
The identification of human skin bindings has been attempted by examining the pattern of hair follicles, to distinguish human skin from that of other animals typically used for bookbinding, such as calf, sheep, goat, and pig. This is a necessarily subjective test, made harder by the distortions in the process of treating leather for binding. Testing a DNA sample is possible in principle, but DNA can be destroyed when skin is tanned, degrades over time, and can be contaminated by human readers.

Instead, peptide mass fingerprinting (PMF) and matrix-assisted laser desorption/ionization (MALDI) have recently been used to identify the material of bookbindings. A tiny sample is extracted from the book's covering and the collagen analysed by mass spectrometry to identify the variety of proteins which are characteristic of different species. PMF can identify skin as belonging to a primate; since monkeys were almost never used as a source of skin for bindings, this implies human skin.

The Historical Medical Library of the College of Physicians of Philadelphia owns five anthropodermic books, confirmed by peptide mass fingerprinting in 2015, of which three were bound from the skin of one woman. This makes it the largest collection of such books in one institution. The books can be seen in the associated Mütter Museum.

The John Hay Library at Brown University owns four anthropodermic books, also confirmed by PMF: Vesalius's De Humani Corporis Fabrica, two nineteenth-century editions of Holbein's Dance of Death, and Mademoiselle Giraud, My Wife (1891).

Three books in the libraries of Harvard University have been reputed to be bound in human skin, but peptide mass fingerprinting has confirmed only one: Des destinées de l'ame by Arsène Houssaye, held in the Houghton Library. The other two books at Harvard were determined to be bound in sheepskin, the first being Ovid's Metamorphoses, held in the Countway Library, the second being a treatise on Spanish law, Practicarum quaestionum circa leges regias Hispaniae, held in the library of Harvard Law School. In 2024, Harvard University announced they had removed the human skin from Des destinées de l'ame and were working towards a respectful disposition of the human remains.

The Harvard skin book belonged to Dr Ludovic Bouland of Strasbourg (died 1932), who rebound a second, De integritatis & corruptionis virginum notis, now in the Wellcome Library in London. The Wellcome also owns a notebook labelled as bound in the skin of 'the Negro whose Execution caused the War of Independence', presumably Crispus Attucks, but the library doubts that it is actually human skin.

== Ethical and legal issues ==
Due to containing human remains, books bound in human skin are considered by some to be inherently problematic in relation to issues such as human trophy collecting, the repatriation and reburial of human remains, and the British Human Tissue Act 2004. Librarian Paul Needham is one of the most outspoken advocates against their preservation. In 2024, Harvard University removed the human skin, stolen post mortem off an unidentified female hospital patient, from Des destinées de l'âme due to ethical concerns.

== See also ==
- Dark Archives
