= John Hay Library =

Library at Brown University

Coordinates: 41°49′35.16″N 71°24′17.81″W

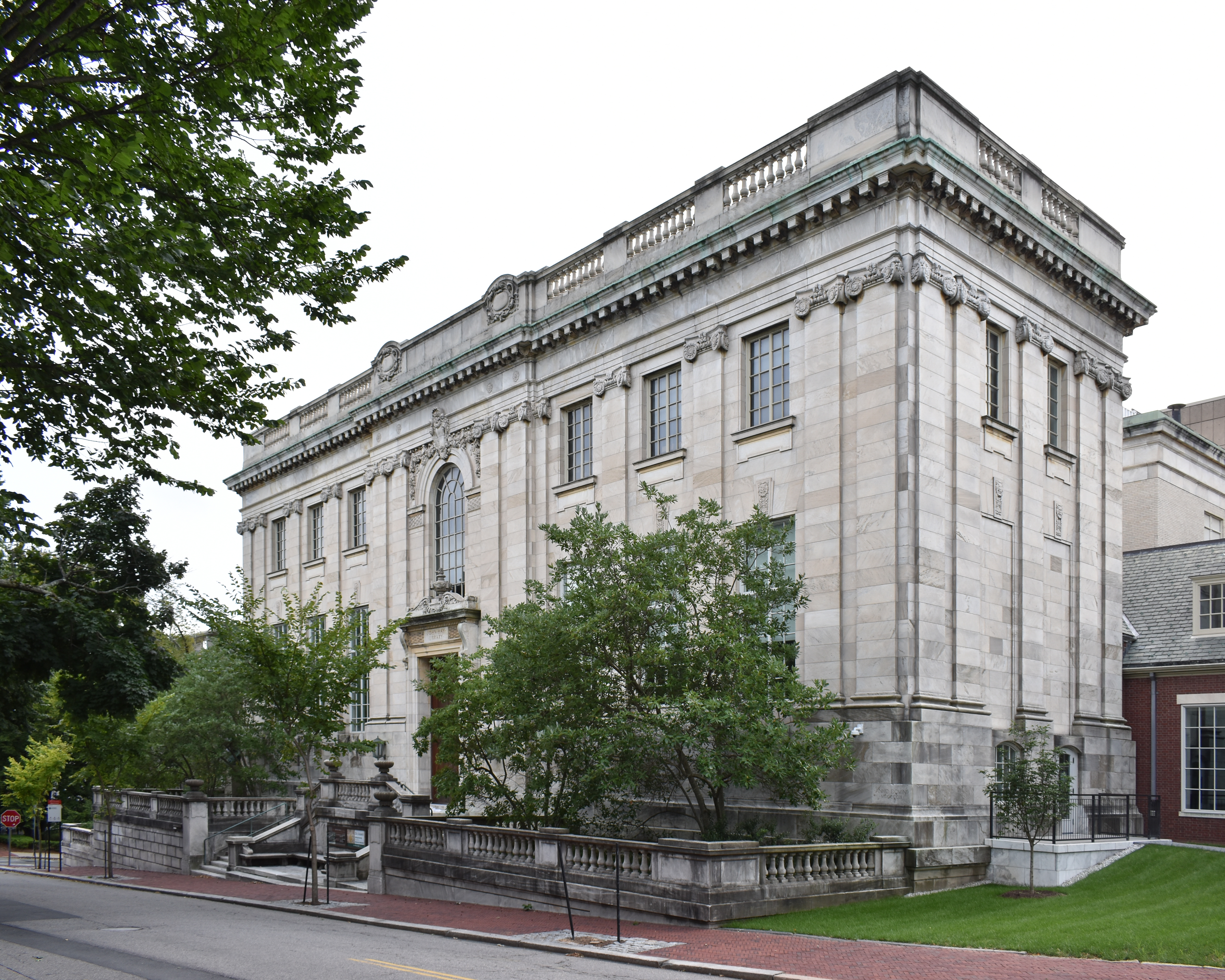
- Location: 20 Prospect Street, Providence, Rhode Island, United States
- Type: Academic
- Established: November 1910; 115 years ago
- Architect: Shepley, Rutan and Coolidge
- Branch of: Brown University Library

Collection
- Size: 3 million

Other information
- Website: library.brown.edu/hay/

The John Hay Library (known colloquially as the Hay) is the second oldest library on the campus of Brown University in Providence, Rhode Island, United States. It is located on Prospect Street opposite the Van Wickle Gates. After its construction in 1910, the Hay Library became the main library building on campus, replacing the building now known as Robinson Hall. Today, the John Hay Library is one of five individual libraries that make up the University Library. The Hay houses the University Library's rare books and manuscripts, the University Archives, and the Library's special collections.

== History ==
By the early 1890s, Brown's 1878 library building had become insufficient in housing the university's growing collection. In 1906, Andrew Carnegie contributed $150,000 (equivalent to $5.37 million in 2025) towards the construction of a new library building. At Carnegie's request, the library was named in honor of his late companion Secretary of State John Hay (Class of 1858).

The building was constructed to a design by the Boston architectural firm of Shepley, Rutan and Coolidge in the Beaux-Arts style. The structure was initially intended to be built of limestone, though was ultimately constructed of white marble quarried in Dorset, Vermont. The library was opened on September 24 and dedicated on November 10, 1910.

In 1939, a new wing was constructed to the north of the original building. The addition was designed by Coolidge, Shepley, Bulfinch and Abbott in the Georgian style and constructed of red brick. As part of the renovation, the main reading room was split into three areas by bookshelves.

The John D. Rockefeller Jr. Library became Brown's main library in 1964, with the John Hay Library retaining the university's special collections. The library provided temporary quarters for the Physical Sciences Library until the Sciences Library was built in 1971. The John Hay Library was completely renovated and rededicated on September 21, 1981. A major renovation of the library headed by Selldorf Architects began in 2013. The building was closed on June 1, 2013, and reopened in Fall 2014. The renovation reconfigured the library's main floor, doubled the exhibition space, and returned the main reading room to its original design.

== Special collections ==
External videos
- Tour of the John Hay Library's McClellan Lincoln Collection, November 15, 1999, C-SPAN
- Tour of the Artists in Uniform Collection, November 30, 1999, C-SPAN
- Tour of the John Hay Library Special Collections, January 7, 2013, C-SPAN

The Library houses Brown's Special Collections division, including those materials that require special handling and preservation. Although many of the items in Special Collections are rare or unique, a majority of the materials are part of large subject-oriented collections which are maintained as discrete units. Altogether, Special Collections consists of over 250 separate collections, numbering some 2.5 million items.

Notable collections include:

- Anne S. K. Brown Military Collection – graphics, books and miniature soldiers
- Brown University Archives – official university records, photographs, university publications, student group records, artifacts, and personal papers
- Colonel George Earl Church Collection – South American explorer and geographer, 3,500 personal manuscripts and letters, plus books
- H. P. Lovecraft Collection – personal manuscripts and letters; the library houses the largest collection of Lovecraft materials in the world
- Henry David Thoreau Collection – books from personal library and journal manuscripts
- George Orwell Collection – includes the original manuscript of Nineteen Eighty-Four – Orwell's only surviving literary manuscript
- Drowne Collection – the personal library of Dr. Solomon Drowne, including an engraving by Paul Revere
- Lownes Collection – Brown's most extensive science collection, contains a copy of Siderius Nuncius annotated by Galileo himself

Other notable items include a Shakespeare First Folio, the first two editions of Copernicus's De Revolutionibus (1543, 1566), a copy of Giambattista Vico’s The New Science (1730) annotated by the author, King George III’s copy of Thomas Jefferson’s Notes on the State of Virginia, a first edition of Leaves of Grass inscribed by Walt Whitman and Oscar Wilde (1855), T.S. Eliot's copy of The Great Gatsby (1925), and 27 Mesopotamian clay tablets and cones.

== Anthropodermic book collection ==
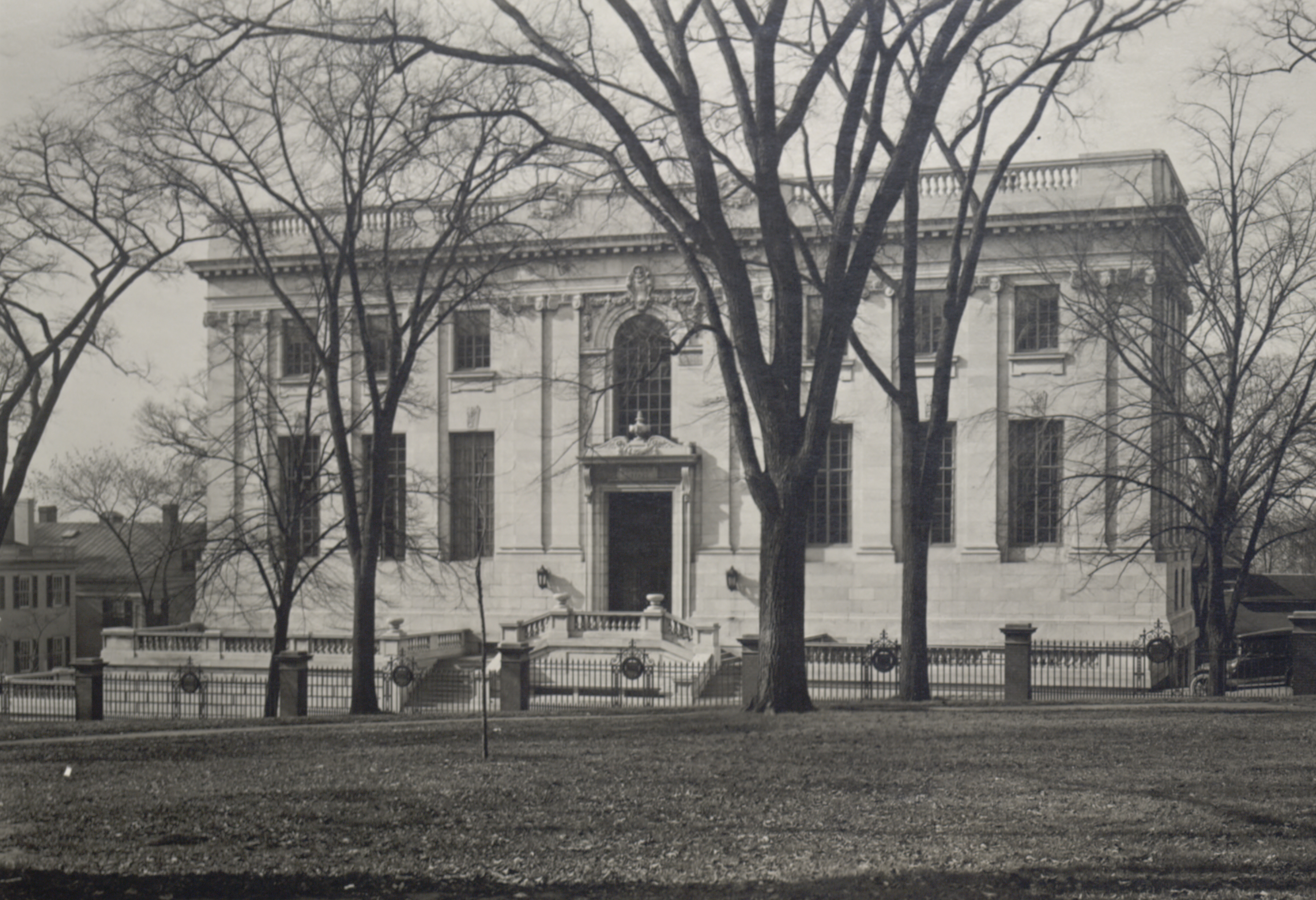
The library in 1920

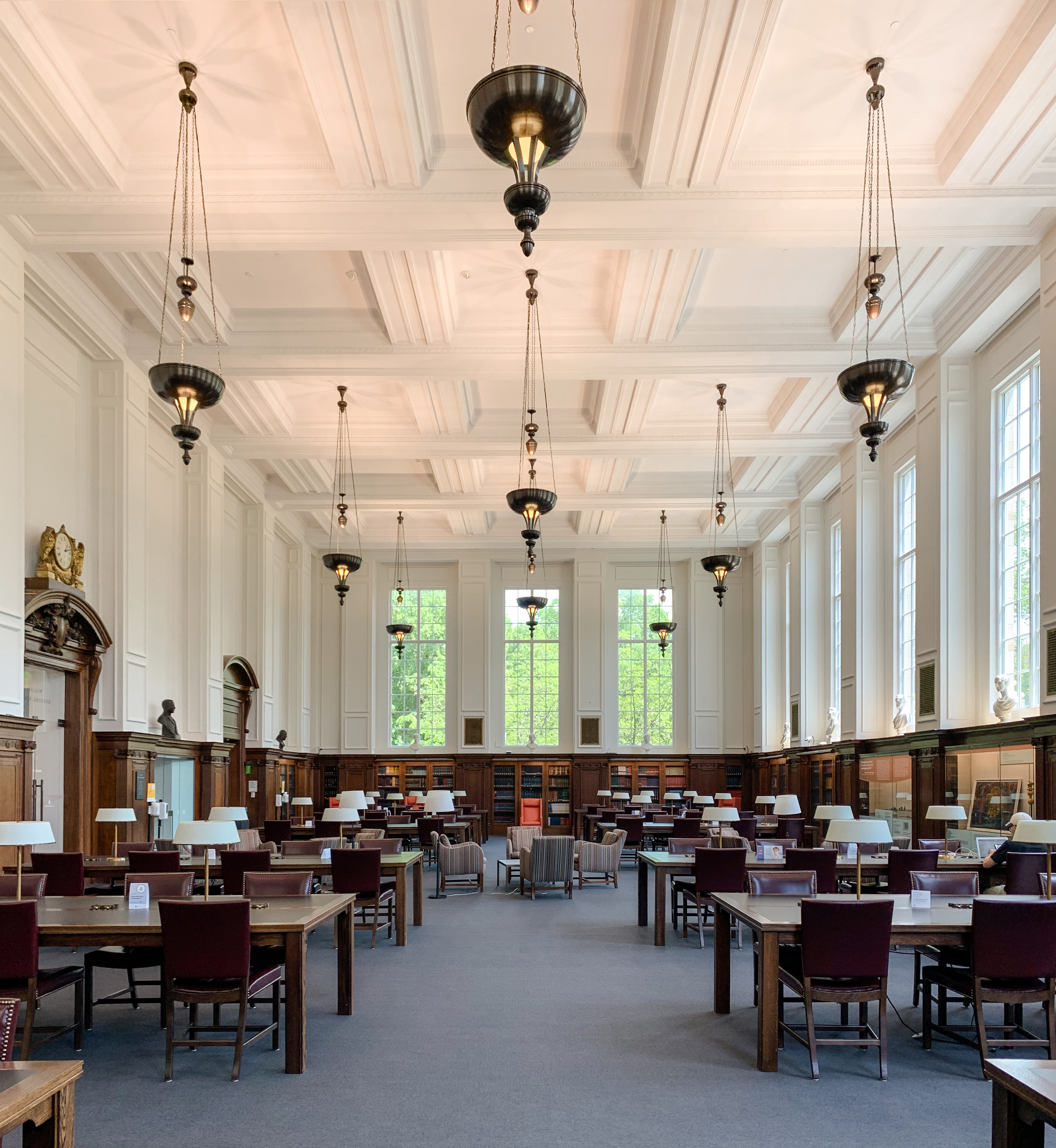
The interior of the library's Willis Reading Room

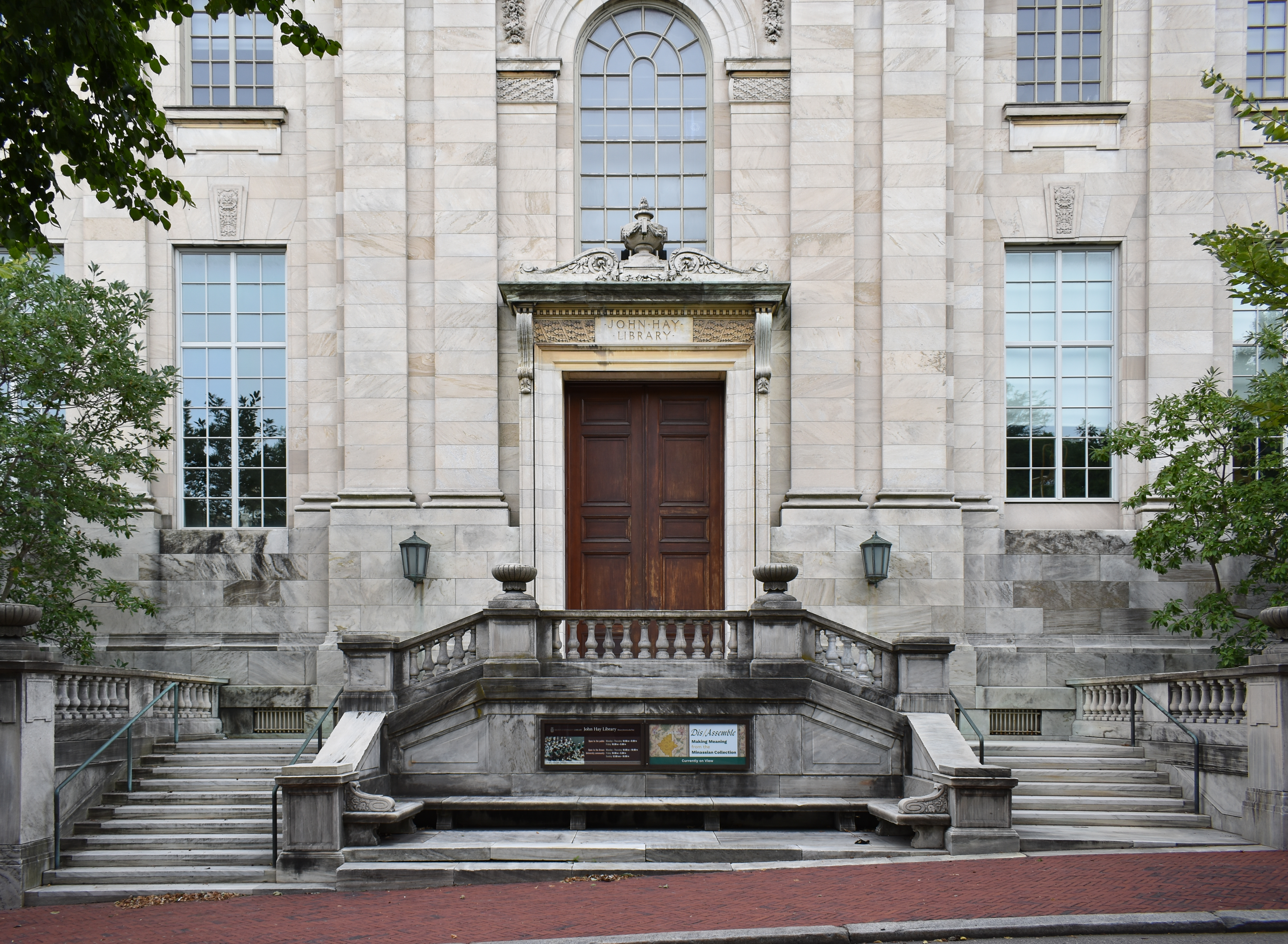
The library's entrance on Prospect Street

The John Hay Library is well known for its collection of anthropodermic books (books bound in human skin). The Hay acquired the books in the 1960s as gifts from two alumni, at least one an avid book collector. The books were not originally bound in human skin, but were instead rebound for private collectors in the 19th century. The library has four such human-skin books:

- De Humanis Corporis Fabrica (Andreas Vesalius, 1543)
- Dance of Death (Hans Holbein the Younger, 1816)
- Dance of Death (Hans Holbein the Younger, 1898)
- Mademoiselle Giraud, My Wife (Adolphe Belot, 1891)

These books are not on display to the public and are treated as human remains.

== Brown University Archives ==
The University Archives serves as the institutional memory of the university by collecting, preserving, and making accessible the materials that provide evidence of past University actions and contribute to an understanding of the university's structure and its history. For the definitive reference work on the history, people, and places of Brown University, please consult the Encyclopedia Brunoniana by Martha Mitchell.

The records of the Corporation that governs Brown University are in the University Archives. They consist of minutes, correspondence, reports, and committee records of the corporation from 1763 to the present. The earliest Corporation records are part of a collection called Rhode Island College miscellaneous papers. These records document the founding of the university, relocation from Warren to Providence, building of University Hall, George Washington's visit in 1790, and other business of the college, ending with Nicholas Brown's letter donating $5,000, which changed the name of the college from Rhode Island College to Brown University and at the same time established the first endowed professorship.

The Archives contains papers of Brown's presidents, select faculty and alumni papers, student organization records, and university publications. There are over 60,000 photographs depicting campus scenes, buildings, groups, events, student activities, athletic teams and events, and individual faculty members, students, and alumni preserved and accessible in the University Archives. Some have been digitized are available at Images of Brown.

The Edward North Robinson Collection of Brown Athletics represents over 150 years of athletics at Brown. Consisting of photographs, moving images, artifacts, posters, drawings, cartoons, administrative records, and publications, this collection traces the earliest days of athletic competition at Brown and Pembroke up through the modern era. This collection is supported through an endowment created by Jackson Robinson (Class of 1964), the grandson of famed Brown football coach. Edward North Robinson.

== The Christine Dunlap Farnham Archive ==
The Christine Dunlap Farnham Archive identifies collections with materials pertaining to women within Special Collections and University Archives. Collections in the Farnham Archive document the history of women in Brown University and Pembroke College, the post-graduate lives of Brown alumnae, and the lives of Rhode Island women. The collections document the lives of prominent women but also chronicle the lives and work of ordinary women. In addition to correspondence, diaries, photographs, newspapers, yearbooks, and memorabilia, it also includes a collection of oral history tapes and videos. A Research Guide to the Christine Dunlap Farnham Archives was published in 1989, which includes more than 1,000 entries describing the collection.

Also included within the Farnham Archive is the Feminist Theory Archive, inaugurated in 2002, which preserves the legacies of prominent feminist thinkers. This collection continues the Pembroke Center for Teaching and Research on Women's commitment to documenting the contributions of feminist scholars to cutting-edge research and making their papers available to scholars.
