= Séverin Pineau =

French physician

Séverin Pineau (c. 1550 – 29 November 1619), in Latin Severinus Pinaeus Carnutensis, was a Parisian physician and surgeon to the king.

== Life and works ==
Pineau is particularly known for his work in the fields of gynecology and obstetrics. His work De virginitatis notis, graviditate et partu, dealing with the signs of virginity, pregnancy and childbirth, caused a sensation in its time for the direct frankness with which he addressed these subjects. Some copies of the book were also confiscated for this reason.

On 1 February 1579 Pineau, in the company, notably, of one of his colleagues and friends, Ambroise Paré, witnessed the dissection of a woman. The dissection was performed by Jacques d’Amboise.

In 1597, he advocated symphysiotomy to give priority to the child during labour.

Pineau was a teacher of Gaspard Bauhin.

== Publications ==
- De gravitate et partu naturali in quo ossa pubis distrahitio demonstratur, Paris, 1597
- Discours touchant l'invention et vraie instruction pour l'opération et extraction du calcul de la vessie, à toutes sortes de personnes, Paris, E. Martin, 1610 OCLC 457805820
- De virginitatis notis, graviditate et partu, Amsterdam, 1663
- Opusculum physiologicum et anatomicum in duos libros distinctum; De integritatis et corruptionis virginum notis; De graviditate et partu naturali mulierum in quo ossa pubis et illium distrahi, dilucide tractatur
- De integritatis et corruptionis virginum notis; graviditate item et partu naturali mulierum, opuscula, Frankfurt, Wohlfart, 1690 OCLC 19575386

== Legacy ==
- A street and a cul-de-sac in Chartres, in Eure-et-Loir, have been named after Pineau since 1970.
