= Narrative of the Life of James Allen =

Autobiography of James Allen

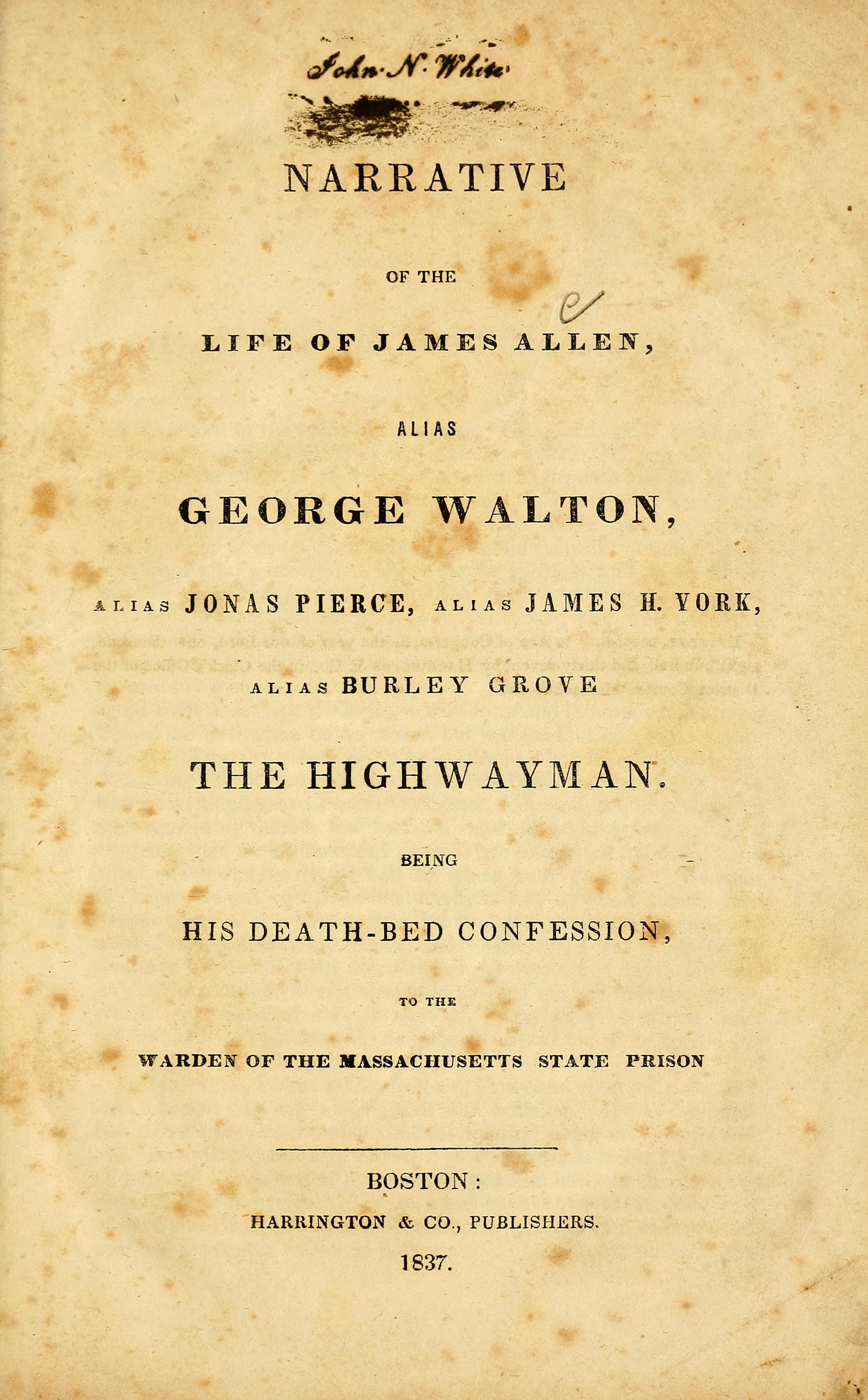
- Title page for Narrative of the Life of James Allen, alias George Walton, alias Jonas Pierce, alias James H. York, alias Burley Grove, the Highwayman, Being His Death-bed Confession to the Warden of the Massachusetts State Prison (1837)
- Author: James Allen
- Genre: Autobiography
- Publisher: Harrington and Co.
- Publication date: 1837
- Publication place: United States
- Text: Narrative of the Life of James Allen at the Internet Archive

The Narrative of the Life of James Allen, alias George Walton, alias Jonas Pierce, alias James H. York, alias Burley Grove, the Highwayman, Being His Death-bed Confession to the Warden of the Massachusetts State Prison is an autobiographical work by James Allen, published in Boston by Harrington and Co. in 1837.

While many copies of the book are extant, the book is most often associated with the copy in the collection of the Boston Athenaeum. This copy was bound in the author's own skin, tradition holding that Allen requested that a copy of his confession be bound in his skin and given to John A. Fenno Jr., who had earlier resisted Allen's attempt to rob him.

The provenance of this book is not fully known, even by the Athenaeum. This version was allegedly given to the Athenaeum some time before 1864 by Mrs. H. M. Chapin, Fenno Jr.'s daughter.

The binding has been scientifically confirmed to be human skin, according to Megan Rosenbloom of the Anthropodermic Book Project, a group which seeks to confirm or deny cases of books allegedly bound in the material.

== About the book ==
The front cover of the famous skin-bound copy has a label which reads "HIC LIBER WALTONIS CUTE COMPACTUS EST" ("This book is bound in the skin of Walton"); Walton was one of the author's aliases.

The narrative is a combination autobiography and confession. It was transcribed by the warden of the Massachusetts State Prison, as the author himself was unable to write.

It details Allen's life, beginning from childhood and laying out his struggles to find honest work as a teenager. Allen explains how he moved from breaking into shops to highway robbery, and how he attempted to escape imprisonment many times.

The book ends with a note from the warden regarding Allen's state of mind toward the end of his life.
