= Arsène Houssaye =

French writer (1814–1896)

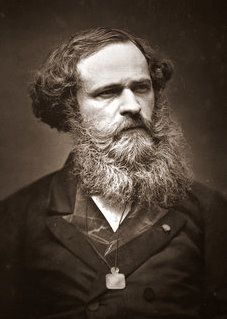
Arsène Houssaye

Arsène Houssaye (28 March 1814 – 26 February 1896) was a French novelist, poet and man of letters.

== Biography ==
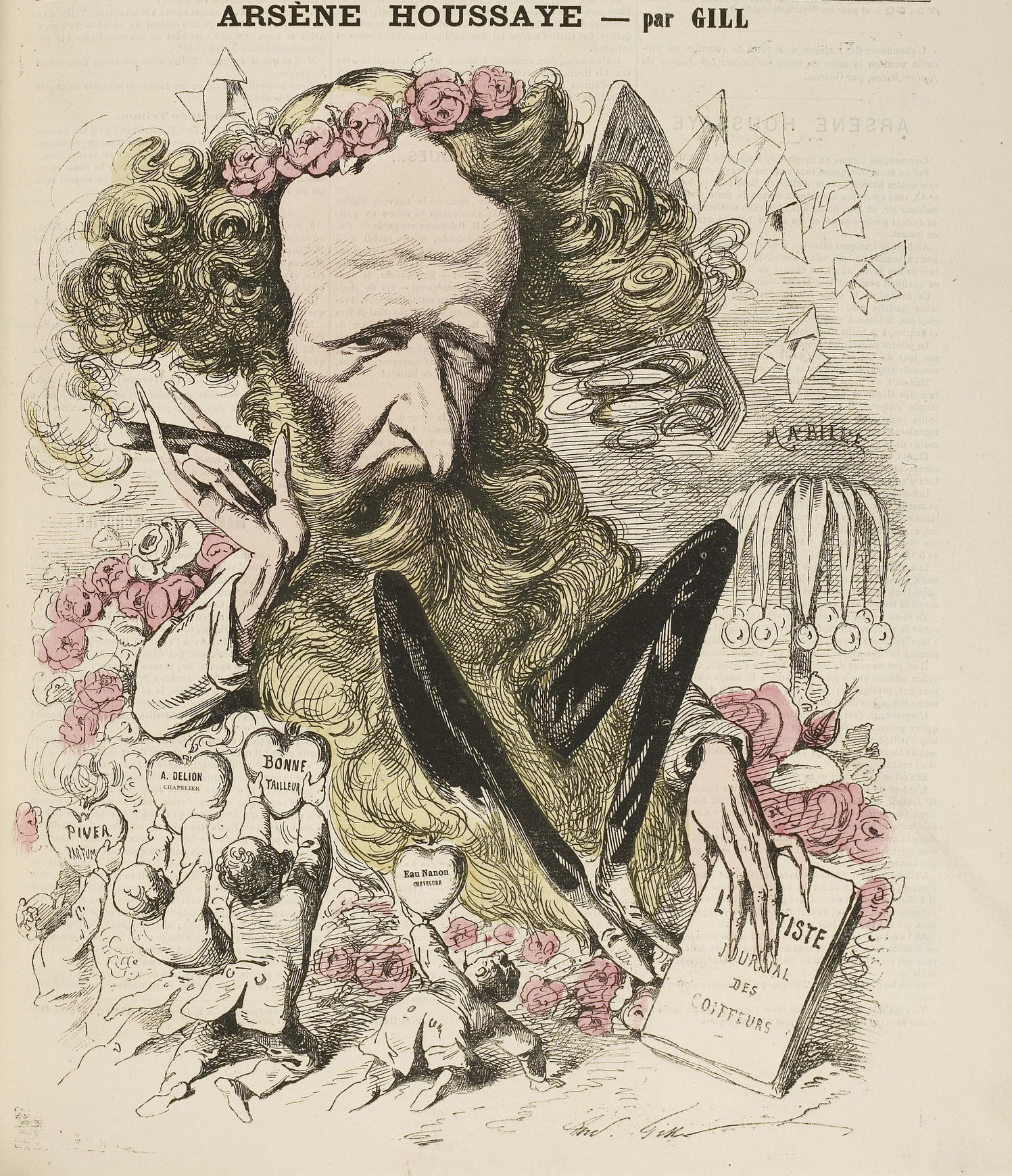
Caricature by André Gill

Houssaye was born in Bruyères (Aisne), near Laon; his original surname was Housset.

In 1832 he found his way to Paris, and in 1836 he published two novels, La Couronne de bleuets and La Pécheresse. He had many friends in Paris, among them Jules Janin and Théophile Gautier, and he wrote in collaboration with Jules Sandeau. He produced art criticism in L'Histoire de la peinture flamande et hollandaise (1846); semi-historical sketches in Mlle de la Vallière et Mme de Montespan (1860) and Galerie de portraits du XVIII siècle (1844); literary criticism in Le Roi Voltaire (1858) and his famous satirical Histoire du quarante et unième fauteuil de l'Académie française, dealing with notables who failed of election to the French Academy (1855); drama in his Comédiennes (1857); poetry in his Symphonie de vingt ans (1867), Cent et un sonnets (1873), etc.; and novels, Les Filles d'Eve (1852) and many others. He was long editor of L'Artiste and for some years was editor and proprietor of La Presse.

In 1849, through the influence of the actress Rachel, he was entrusted with the administration of the Theâtre Français, a position he filled with unfailing tact and success until 1859, when he was made inspector general of fine art.

In 1863, when excavating the site of the chapel of Saint-Florentin at the Chateau d'Amboise in the Loire Valley, he found a partially-complete skeleton and stone fragments bearing the inscription 'EO [...] DUS VINC'. The unusually large skull led Houssaye to conclude he had located the remains of Leonardo, which were re-interred in the chapel of Saint-Hubert at the same chateau. Reflecting doubts about the attribution, a plaque above the tomb states that the remains are only "presumed" to be those of Leonardo. In 2016, it was announced that DNA tests were to be conducted to investigate the veracity of the attribution, with results expected in 2019.

His Confessions, souvenirs d'un demi-siècle appeared in 1885–91. See also J. Lemaître, Arsène Houssaye (1897), with a bibliography.

He died in Paris. His son Henry was a noted historian.

== Source ==
- Belyaev, N. S. (2018). Honorary Free Associates of the Imperial Academy of Arts. Brief biographical guide (PDF). St Petersburg: Russian Academy of Sciences. p. 90. ISBN 978-5-336-00234-8.
