= Not Tonight =

Not Tonight may refer to:

- Not Tonight: Migraine and the Politics of Gender and Health, a 2014 book by Joanna Kempner
- "Not Tonight" (song), a song by Lil' Kim
- Not Tonight (video game), a role-playing adventure game
- "Not Tonight", a version of Bernstein's "Tonight", in the TV series Play It Again
- "Not Tonight", a song by the Cars from It's Alive!
- "Not Tonight", a 1985 song by Junior Giscombe
