= Parish church of St. Gallus =

Parish church of St. Gallus can mean:

- Parish church of St. Gallus, Bregenz, Austria
- Parish church of St. Gallus and Ulrich, Kißlegg, Germany
