= Yes, Your Grace 2: Snowfall =

2025 video game

- Developer: Brave at Night
- Publisher: Brave at Night
- Series: Yes, Your Grace
- Engine: Unity
- Platforms: Microsoft Windows; Android/iOS; Nintendo Switch
- Release: Microsoft Windows; WW: May 8, 2025; Nintendo Switch, Android, iOS; WW: October 21, 2026
- Genres: Role-playing, strategy
- Mode: Single-player

Yes, Your Grace 2: Snowfall is a role-playing strategy video game developed and published by Brave at Night. A direct sequel to the studio's 2020 game Yes, Your Grace, it was released for Microsoft Windows on May 8, 2025, with versions for Xbox Series X/S, Xbox One and Nintendo Switch announced for later the same year. It released for Nintendo Switch, Android, and iOS on October 21st 2026.The game was announced under the title Yes, Your Grace: Snowfall at Summer Game Fest in June 2023.

Like its predecessor, Snowfall casts the player as the ruler of the kingdom of Davern, hearing petitioners in a throne room and distributing limited resources among them. It received mixed to positive reviews, with critics praising its pixel art and atmosphere while criticising the shallowness of its choices and a large number of bugs at launch.

== Gameplay ==
Yes, Your Grace 2: Snowfall is a kingdom management game structured in weekly turns. Each week the player receives a randomised queue of petitioners, each of whom states a minimum expectation that must be met to keep the kingdom's population content, and decides whom to help and whom to turn away. Alongside distributing gold and supplies, the player collects taxes, passes laws and assigns agents — soldiers, witches and other specialists, each with a limited number of actions and their own personality — to resolve petitions.

The sequel adds systems not present in the original, including a prestige-conversion mechanic and kingdom upgrades, while retaining the approachable structure of the first game. Items gathered through exploration can be assigned to petitions whose category they match, and misallocated resources are refunded. The game opens with a recap of the first title and a questionnaire that lets players define the choices made in it, so that those decisions carry into the sequel. Presentation uses a 2.5D pixel art style shown from a side perspective.

== Plot ==
The story begins a year after the events of Yes, Your Grace, with Davern still recovering from war and facing a harsh winter. Lord Jakub arrives at the capital, Grevno, with his son Tymo over a dispute that turns violent and leaves King Eryk gravely wounded. With Eryk incapacitated and his heirs too young to succeed him, his wife Queen Aurelea becomes the kingdom's de facto ruler, contending with internal unrest and external threats while the court affords her less authority than it would a king. The player controls Eryk in the opening chapters and Aurelea from the third chapter onward.

== Development and release ==
Brave at Night announced the sequel as Yes, Your Grace: Snowfall during Summer Game Fest on June 8, 2023, initially for a 2024 release on Windows via Steam and GOG.com, as well as Xbox Series X/S, Xbox One and Nintendo Switch. The studio had not planned a sequel while making the first game and began work after the original's reception generated repeated requests for one; the game was rebuilt from scratch in Unity to improve performance and support new systems such as the randomised petitioner queue.

The release slipped to 2025. In April 2025, Brave at Night confirmed a May 8, 2025 launch for Windows, with the Xbox Series X/S, Xbox One and Switch versions to follow later that year. Unlike the first game, which was published by No More Robots, the sequel was self-published.

== Reception ==
Reception

Aggregate score
Aggregator	Score
Metacritic	74/100

Review scores
Publication	Score
GameCritics	8/10
GameStar	73/100
KonsoliFIN	4/5

Yes, Your Grace 2: Snowfall received "mixed or average" reviews according to review aggregator Metacritic, which assigned it a score of 74 out of 100 based on five critic reviews. OpenCritic logged four reviews, too few to generate an average.

Brad Gallaway of GameCritics was among the most positive, scoring the game 8 out of 10 and calling it a worthy successor whose mechanics are deeper than the original's and whose narrative moves the setting forward, though he considered playing the first game close to essential. Risto Karinkanta of the Finnish outlet KonsoliFIN likewise rated it 4 out of 5, describing it as a strong sequel that offers more of what made the original popular without being radically innovative. GameStar gave 73 out of 100, summarising the game as an atmospheric medieval excursion whose story ends far too abruptly.

Several reviewers criticised the game's technical state at launch and the limited weight of its choices. Lloyd Opalec of Game8 scored it 72 out of 100, praising the pixel art and score but reporting progress-blocking freezes and softlocks and arguing that most decisions alter little more than a line of dialogue; he recommended waiting for patches. Jess Clayton-Berry of GameLuster was more negative at 6 out of 10, writing that the sequel offers what the first game did but worse, and that its narrative and gameplay problems run deeper than the launch bugs.
