= Zürn =

Zürn is a German surname. Notable people with the surname include:

- Erich Zürn (1906–1965), German U-boat engineer during World War II
- Georg Zürn (1834–1884), mayor of Würzburg, Germany
- Hans Zürn the Elder, 16th-17th century German sculptor
- Unica Zürn (1916–1970), German author and painter
- Walter Zürn (born 1937), German physicist and seismologist

== See also ==
- Morgan Zurn, American lawyer and judge
- Zurn Peak, mountain in Antarctica named after Walter Zürn
- Zurn Water LLC, an American drainage and plumbing systems manufacturer
