= Empire of Death =

Empire of Death may refer to:

- Empire of Death (Bishop novel), a BBC Books Doctor Who original novel written by David Bishop, featuring the Fifth Doctor and Nyssa
- Empire of Death (DC Comics), a fictional criminal terrorist organizations published by DC Comics
- "Empire of Death" (Doctor Who episode), the eighth and final episode of the fourteenth series
  - Empire of Death (Handcock novel), a novelisation of the Doctor Who episode
- The Empire of Death (Koudounaris book), the ossuary research and photographs of American author Paul Koudounaris
