= 1747 in architecture =

The year 1747 in architecture involved some significant events.

== Buildings and structures ==
=== Buildings ===
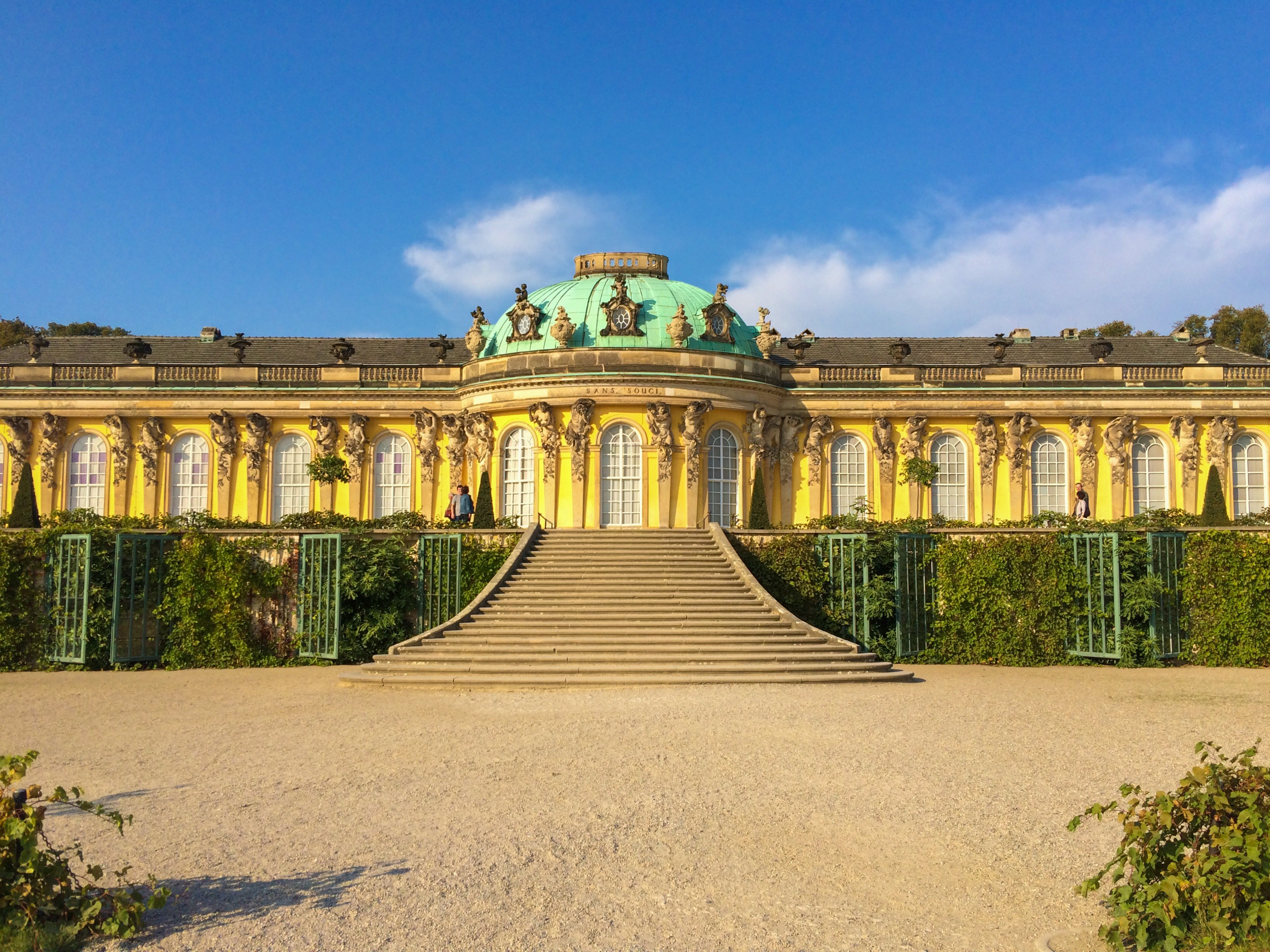
Sanssouci, Potsdam

- Sanssouci in Potsdam, designed by Georg Wenzeslaus von Knobelsdorff, is completed.
- Schlosstheater Schönbrunn in Vienna, designed by Nicolò Pacassi, is completed.
- Pálffy Palace (Bratislava) is built.
- Reconstruction of church of Santi Quaranta Martiri e San Pasquale Baylon, Rome, by Giuseppe Sardi is completed.
- Visitation of Mary Church (Ljubljana), designed by Candido Zulliani, is consecrated.
- The tower of St. Mary's Church, Rotherhithe, London, is built by Lancelot Dowbiggin.
- Usk Bridge (Usk), Monmouthshire, designed by William Edwards, is completed.

== Births ==
- Vincenzo Brenna, Florentine-born architect (died 1820)

== Deaths ==
- April 24 – Johann Georg Fischer, German architect (born 1673)
