= Descenders =

2019 cycling video game

- Developer: RageSquid
- Publisher: No More Robots (Note: PlayStation 4 and Nintendo Switch retail versions published by Sold Out. iOS and Android version developed and published by Noodlecake Studios.)
- Director: Lex Deecrauw
- Designer: Roel Ezendam
- Programmers: Roel Ezendam; Elwin Fransz
- Artist: Roan Albers
- Engine: Unity
- Platforms: Linux; macOS; Windows; Xbox One; PlayStation 4; Nintendo Switch; Xbox Series X/S; Android; iOS; Nintendo Switch 2; PlayStation 5
- Release: Linux, macOS, Windows, Xbox One; 7 May 2019; PlayStation 4; 25 August 2020; Nintendo Switch; 6 November 2020; Xbox Series X/S; 8 June 2021; Android, iOS; 4 August 2022; PS5, Switch 2; TBA
- Genre: Extreme sports
- Modes: Single-player, Multiplayer

Descenders is a cycling game developed by RageSquid and published by No More Robots. It was released for Linux, macOS, Windows, and Xbox One on 7 May 2019, for PlayStation 4 on 25 August 2020, for Nintendo Switch on 6 November 2020 and Xbox Series X/S on 8 June 2021. A mobile version for iOS and Android was released on 4 August 2022. Versions for Nintendo Switch 2 and PlayStation 5 are set to release in the future.

A sequel, Descenders Next, was released for Windows, Xbox One, and Xbox Series X/S on 21 July 2025. It is expected to be released for PlayStation at a later date.

== Gameplay ==
Descenders is a downhill mountain biking video game which puts players in different environments. Each level in the game is procedurally generated. In each level, the player races a downward course on a relatively dirt trail. During the trials, the player gains opportunities to perform tricks with their bicycle. Each level also presents a set of random objectives to complete, such as performing a trick a certain number of times, or finishing a race within a certain time. Each level also contains checkpoints which serve as respawn points upon bailing. Bail often, and the player fails the level.

== Development ==
RageSquid was part of a game studio incubation program at the Dutch Game Garden in Utrecht. The developers there noted a lack of extreme sports video games on the market. Having grown up with several such games they decided to make their own to see if there was still a market for it. Prior to deciding on mountain biking the team considered other sports including rock climbing and wing suiting amongst others. At one point they prototyped a pogo stick game which "was hilarious to look at, but it was hard to make a fun game out of it". In addition to Extreme Sport games the team also enjoyed roguelikes such as Spelunky and FTL and decided to combine the two genres and "fell in love with the result and decided to continue along that path".

Early on the team struggled with getting the physics right feeling that a good physics system was make or break for the game. As such the team spent the first few months designing one before working on the rest of the game with RageSquid stating that the Skate series was the team's biggest inspiration for this aspect. For tricks RageSquid opted against having a list of preset button combinations instead opting for a system about "combining motions" which they stated makes the final game "more about expressing a personal style, which makes it more of a genuine extreme sports experience".

== Reception ==
Reception

Aggregate score
Aggregator	Score
Metacritic	(PC) 78/100 (PS4) 75/100 (XONE) 77/100 (NS) 73/100

Review scores
Publication	Score
Nintendo Life	8/10
Nintendo World Report	6.5/10
Push Square	7/10

Descenders received "generally favorable" reviews, according to review aggregator Metacritic.

Mitch Bowman of PC Gamer felt optimistic about Descenders' progress, criticizing its lack of variety in features while praising the variety in level design. Tim Rogers of Kotaku called the game "fast and smooth", and commented about the nauseating thrill the framerate gave him. Matthew Kato at Game Informer praised the branching level structure. Brendan Caldwell of Rock, Paper, Shotgun enjoyed the humour of the game, but was not impressed at the cosmetic rewards and the level design. Dante Douglas at Polygon gave the early access version of the game a 7.0, praising the tight controls and presentation.
