= Megan Rosenbloom =

American expert on human skin bookbinding

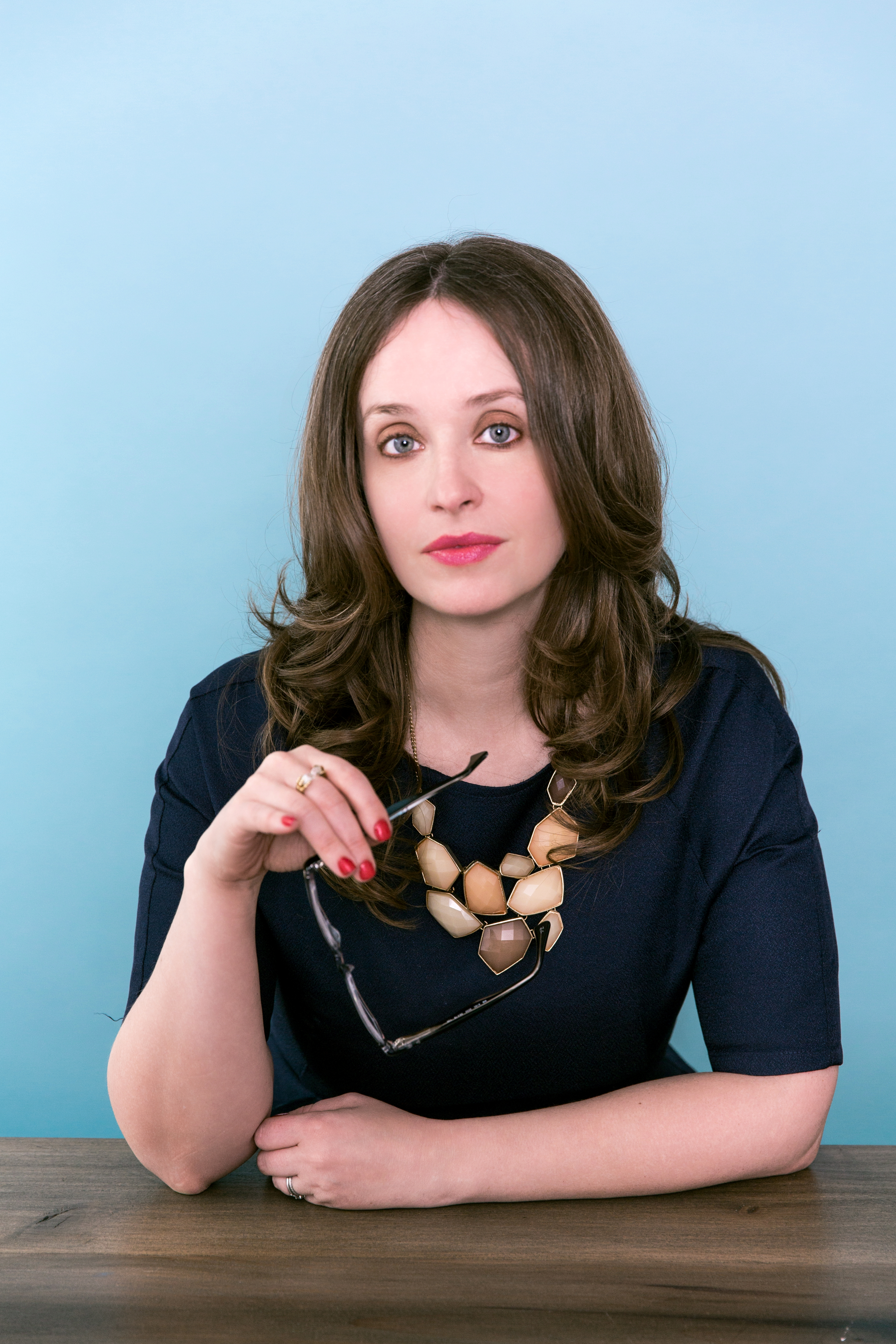
- Rosenbloom in 2016
- Born: Megan Curran Rosenbloom; 1981 (age 43–44)
- Education: Drexel University (BA); University of Pittsburgh (MLIS)
- Occupation: Medical librarian
- Known for: Anthropodermic Book Project
- Website: Official website

Megan Curran Rosenbloom (born 1981) is an American medical librarian and expert on anthropodermic bibliopegy, the practice of binding books in human skin. She is a team member of the Anthropodermic Book Project, a group which scientifically tests skin-bound books to determine whether their origins are human. Rosenbloom is the author of Dark Archives, a 2020 non-fiction book on the history, provenance, and myths about books bound in human skin.

== Education ==
In 2004, Rosenbloom earned a bachelor of arts degree in journalism from Drexel University. Rosenbloom received her Master of Library and Information Science from the University of Pittsburgh in 2008.

== Career ==
Rosenbloom is a collection strategies librarian at UCLA Library in Los Angeles. She previously worked as a medical librarian at University of Southern California Norris Medical Library, and as an obituary editor for the Journal of the Medical Library Association.

Through her library work, Rosenbloom had access to a large number of old and rare medical books that were also about death. She began doing public lectures on the way the history of medical advancements is intertwined with the use of nameless corpses and met Caitlin Doughty; together they curate Death Salon events. Rosenbloom believes the more people deny the inevitability of death, "the more people are psychically destroyed when it happens in their lives." She co-founded and directs Death Salon, the events arm of The Order of the Good Death where people can have conversations and discussions with others about death. Death Salons are a mix of private Order of the Good Death business and public events, happening nearly annually since 2013.

As a member of the Anthropodermic Book Project, Rosenbloom and her colleagues Daniel Kirby, Richard Hark and Anna Dhody use peptide mass fingerprinting to determine if the binding on books is of human origin. Rosenbloom is part of the outreach team, trying to convince rare book libraries to have their books tested.

== Writings ==
- Rosenbloom, Megan (Summer 2016). "A Book by its Cover: Identifying & Scientifically Testing the World's Books Bound in Human Skin" (PDF). The Watermark: Newsletter of the Archivists and Librarians in the History of the Health Sciences. 39 (3): 20–22. ISSN 1553-7641.
- Rosenbloom, Megan (October 19, 2016). "A Book by Its Cover". Lapham’s Quarterly.
- Rosenbloom, Megan (2020). Dark Archives: A Librarian's Investigation into the Science and History of Books Bound in Human Skin. Farrar, Straus and Giroux. ISBN 9780374134709.

== See also ==
- Death Cafe
