= Catacomb saints =

Type of Christian relic

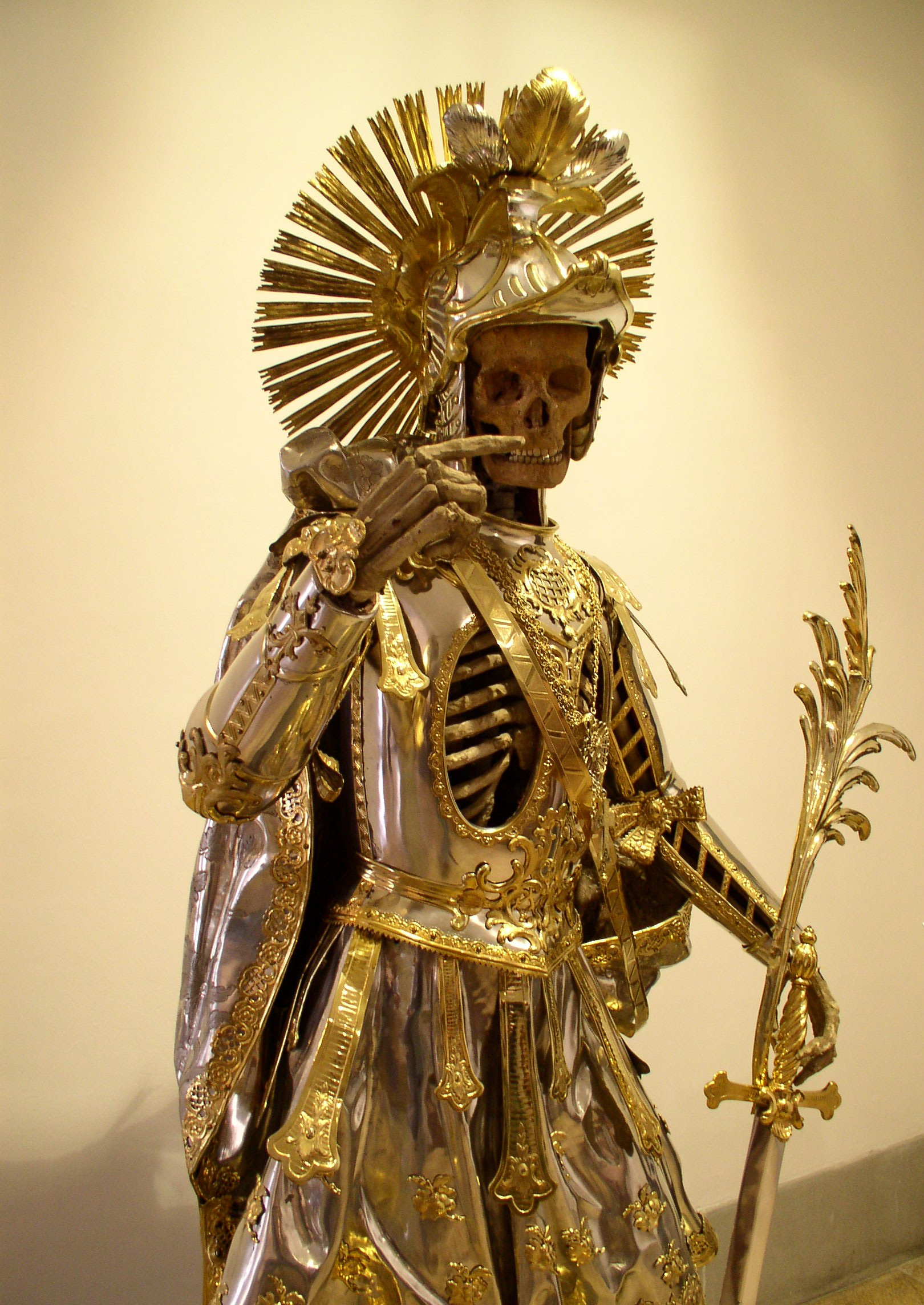
A relic from the Holy Catacombs of Pancratius. Image taken at an exhibition at the Historical Museum St. Gallen. The relic can normally be seen in the Stadtkirche St. Nikolaus in Wil.

Catacomb saints were the bodies of ancient Christians that were carefully exhumed from the catacombs of Rome and sent abroad to serve as relics of certain saints from the 16th century to the 19th century. They were typically lavishly decorated with gold and precious stones.

== History ==
During the Beeldenstorm of the 16th century and continued iconoclasm of the 17th century, Catholic churches throughout Europe were systematically stripped of their religious symbols, iconography and relics. In response, the Vatican ordered that thousands of skeletons be exhumed from the catacombs beneath the city and installed in towns throughout Germany, Austria and Switzerland. Few, if any, of the corpses belonged to people of any religious significance; though, given their burial, some may have been early Christian martyrs. Each was nonetheless painstakingly dressed and decorated as one of the various Catholic saints. One church spent 75 gulden dressing their saint.

Though selling the relics would have been considered simony, enterprising church officials still managed to raise funds while countering the iconoclasm by charging for transportation, decoration, induction and blessing. Historian and author Diarmaid MacCulloch compared the collection of catacomb saints by rich Bavarian families as being akin to the modern-day practice of purchasing personalised number plates, given that many of the saints shared the name of their patron. Church officials became adept at uncovering saints related to particular wealthy families.

By the 19th century, many of the fakes had been discovered. Some were stripped of their finery and destroyed while others were placed in storage.

== Modern interest ==
In 1803, the secular magistrate of Rottenbuch in Bavaria auctioned the town's two saints. 174 years later, in 1977, the residents of the town raised funds to have them returned.

Paul Koudounaris revived interest in the catacomb saints with his 2013 book Heavenly Bodies. In publishing the book, Koudounaris sought to find and photograph each of the extant saints.

== Gallery ==
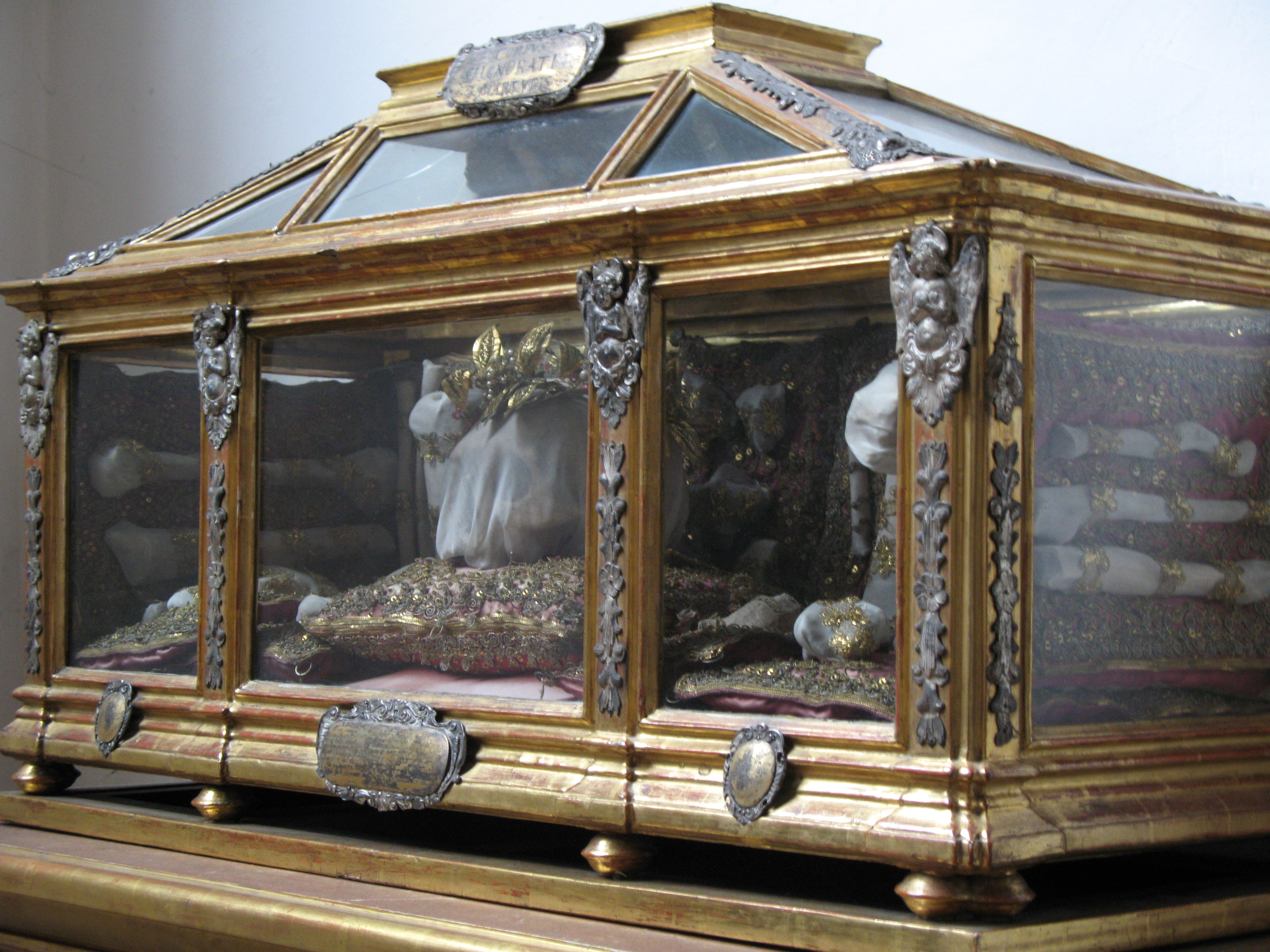
A reliquary in St. Peter's Church, Munich.

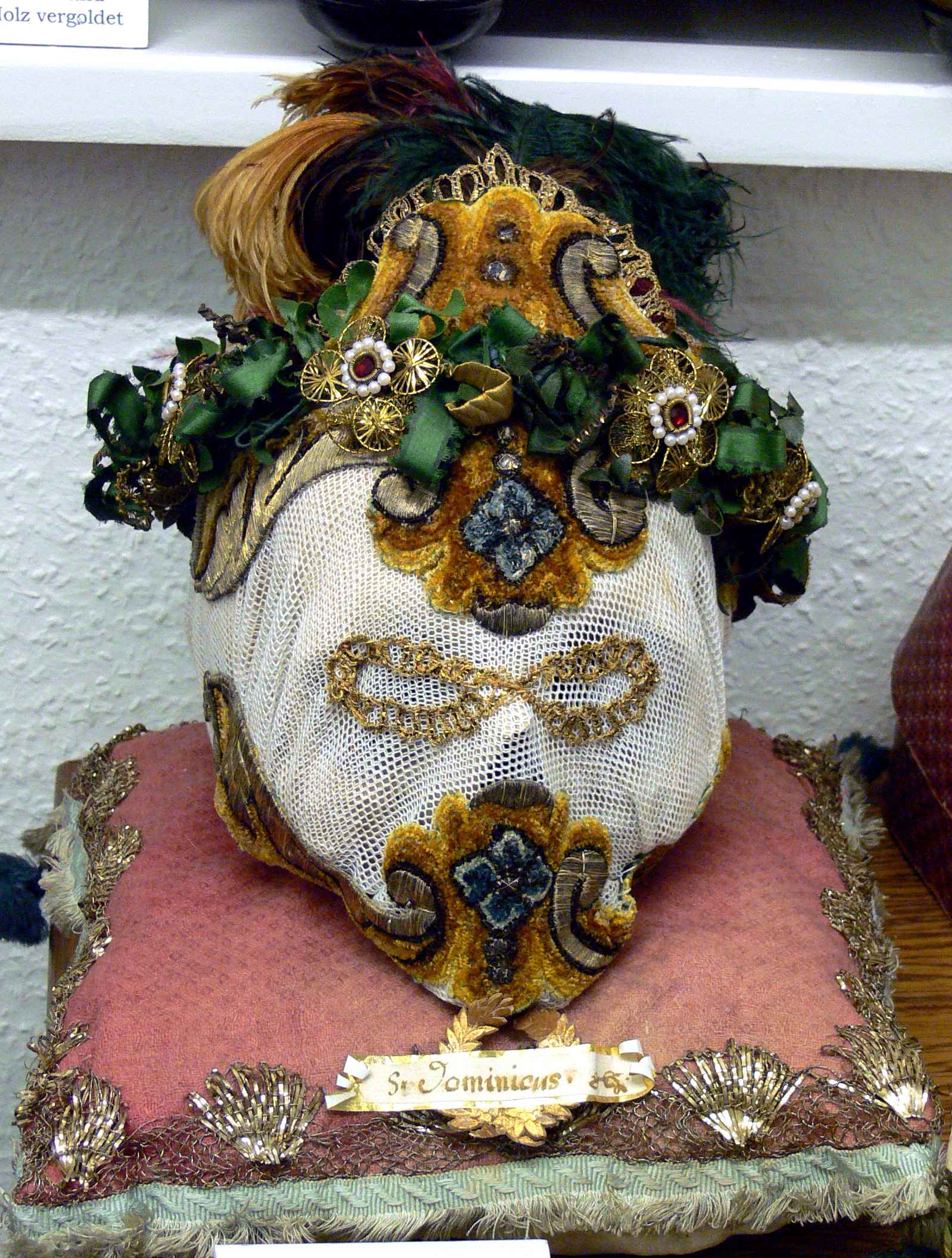
The decorated skull of Saint Dominicus.

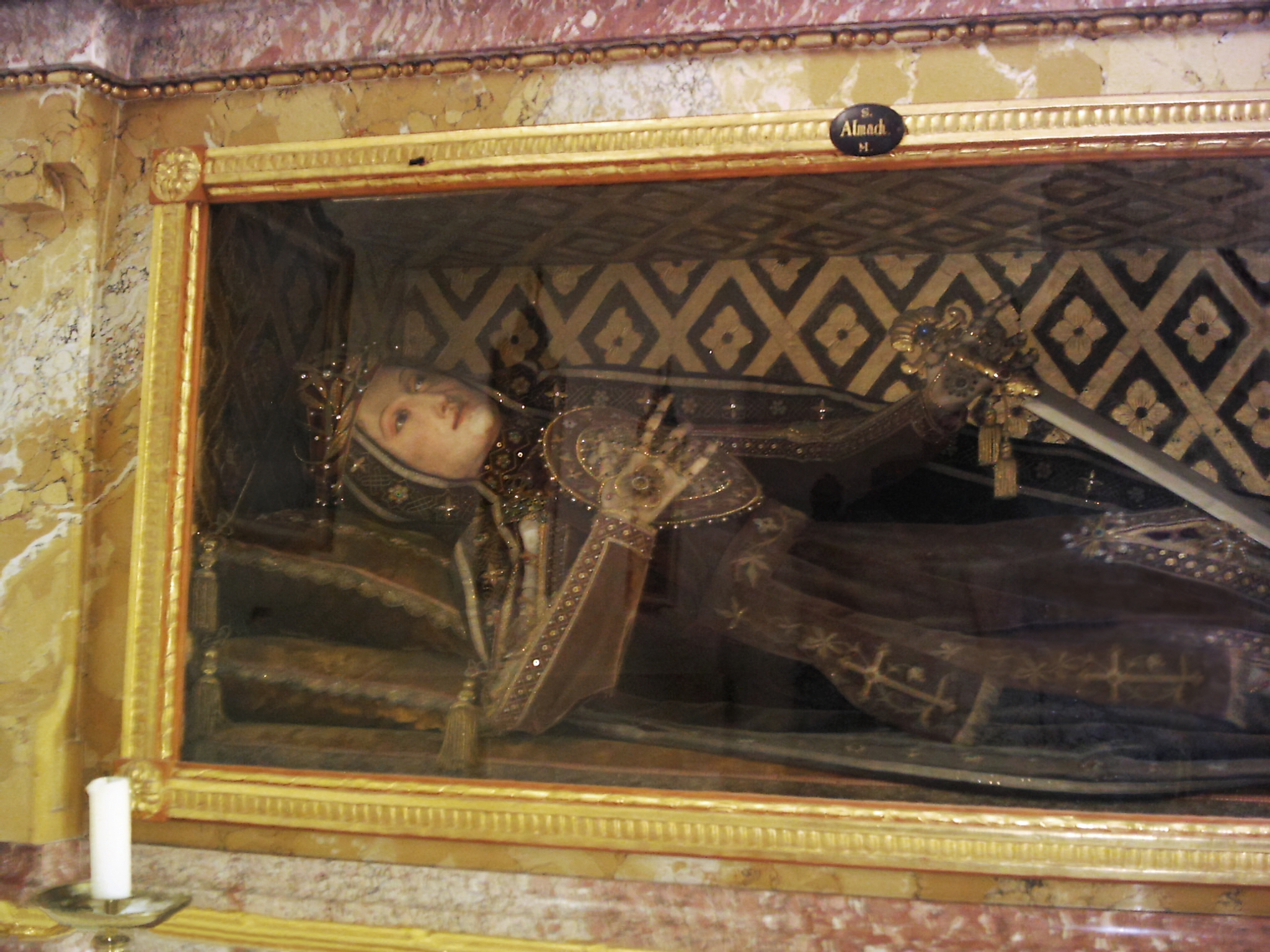
The armed corpse of Saint Verena.

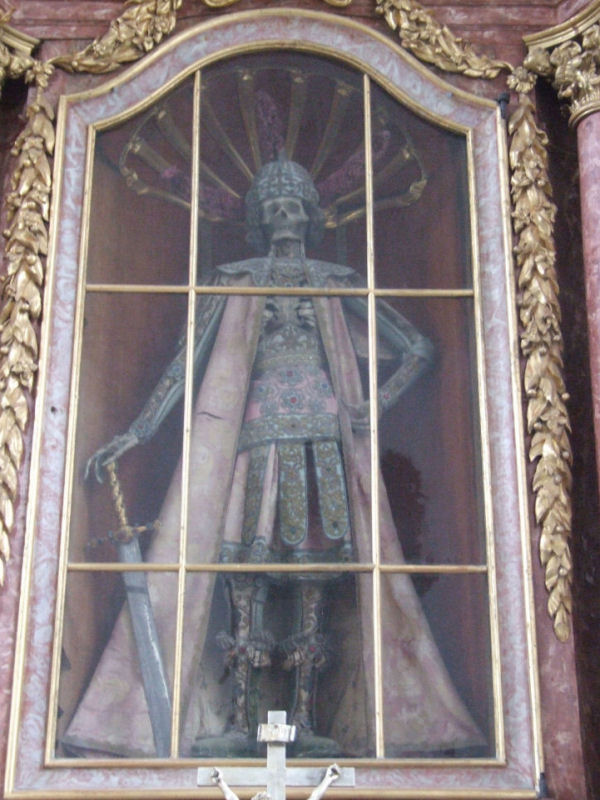
A glass case protects the corpse of the martyr Candidus at the Irsee Abbey, Bavaria.

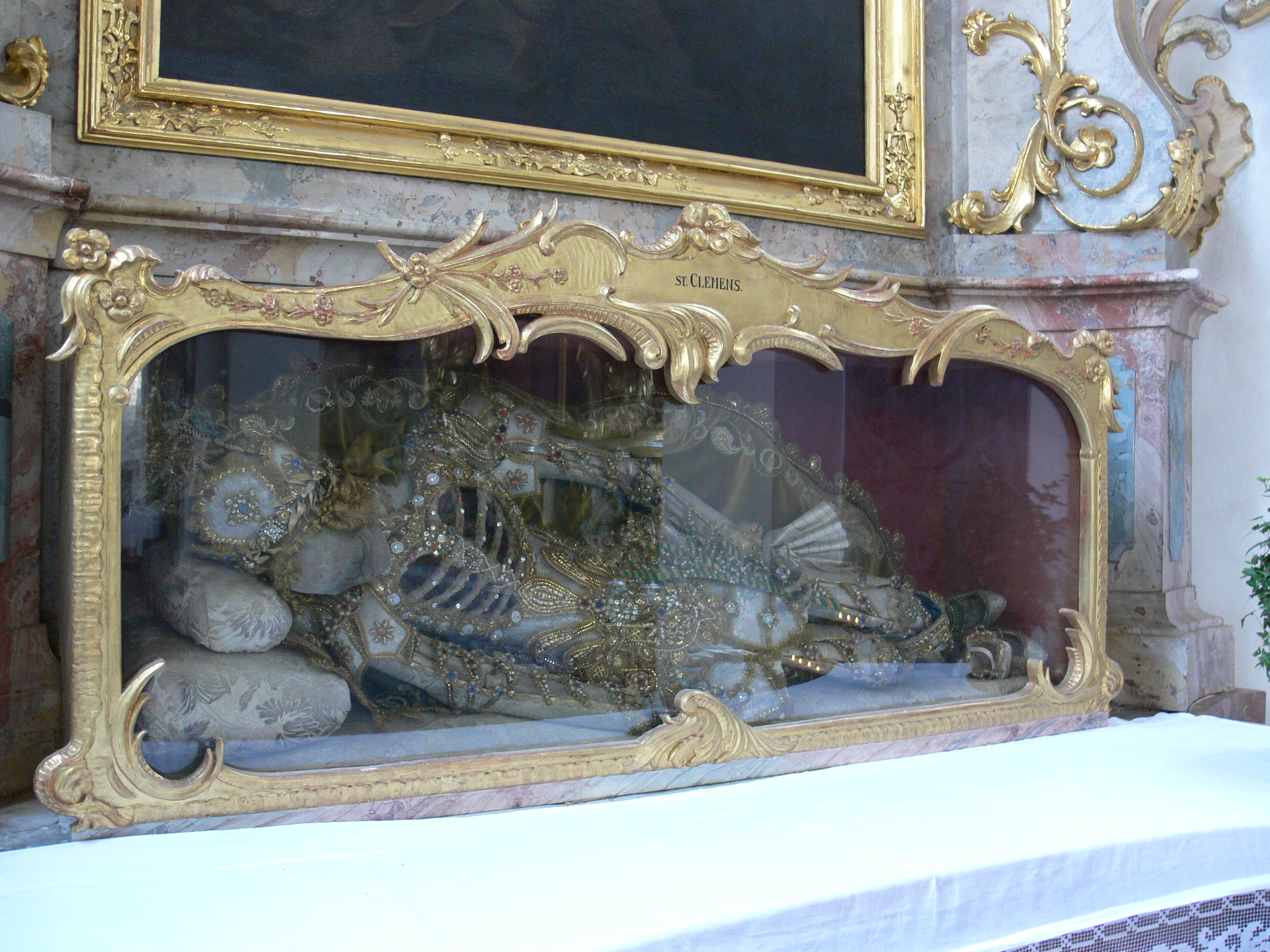
The sarcophagus of Saint Clemens at the Parish church of St. Gallus and Ulrich, Kißlegg, Germany.
