= Parish church of St. Gallus and Ulrich, Kißlegg =

Roman Catholic church in Kißlegg, Germany

Coordinates: 47°47′15″N 9°52′49″E

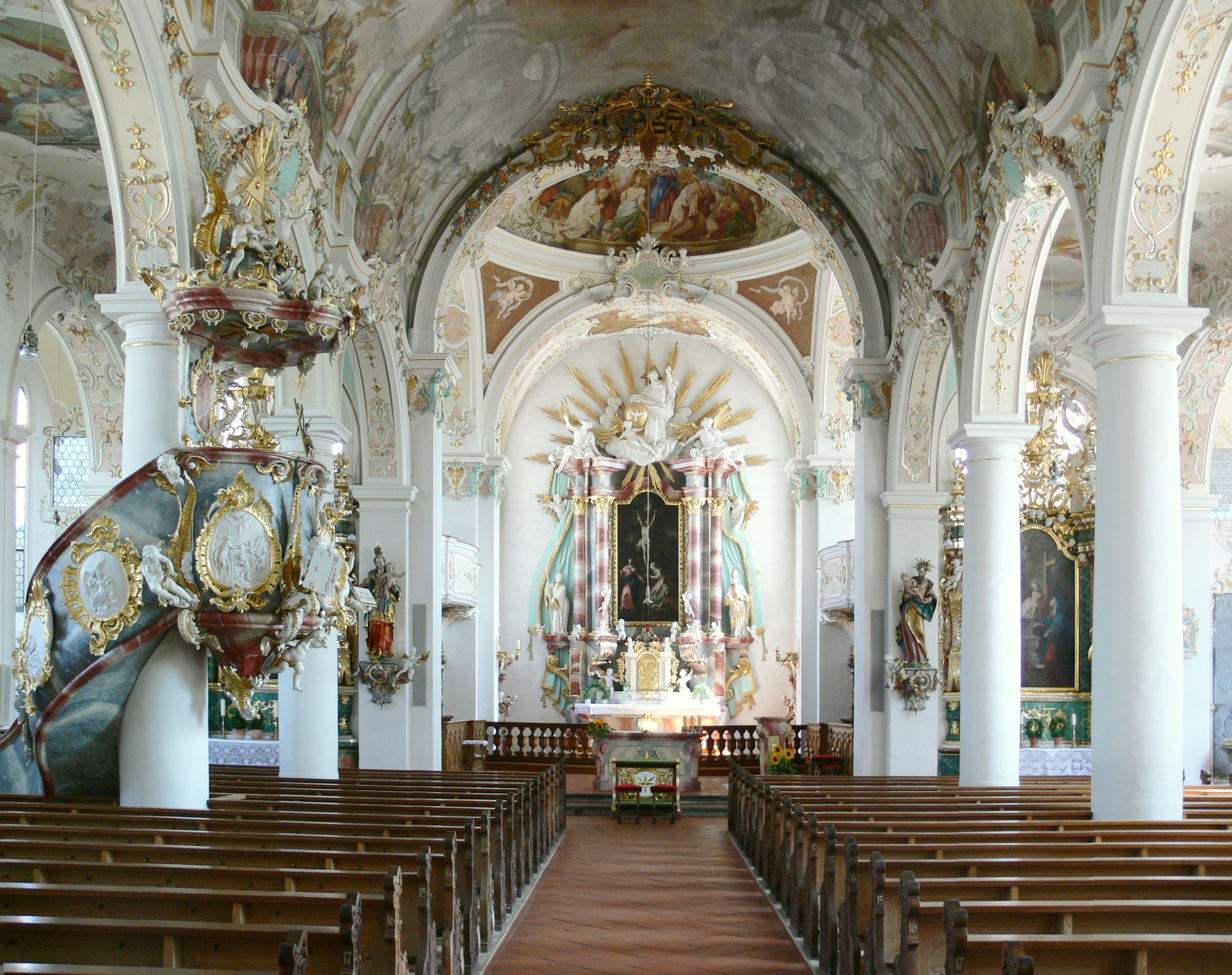
Interior of the parish church of St. Gallus and Ulrich in Kißlegg

The Parish Church of St Gallus and Ulrich is a Roman Catholic church in Kißlegg, Germany. It was built in 1734-1738 by Johann Georg Fischer through the conversion of a Gothic church predecessor. The tower, which survives from the original construction, is from the twelfth or thirteenth century. It was extensively renovated between 1974 and 1980. The church contains a Madonna of 1623 (attributed to Hans Zürn the Elder), a baroque pulpit of divination Johann Wilhelm (1745), and numerous tombs of the 16th and 17th centuries. The church also has a valuable treasure of silver (1741-1755) from the workshop of the Augsburg silversmith Franz Christoph Mäderl.

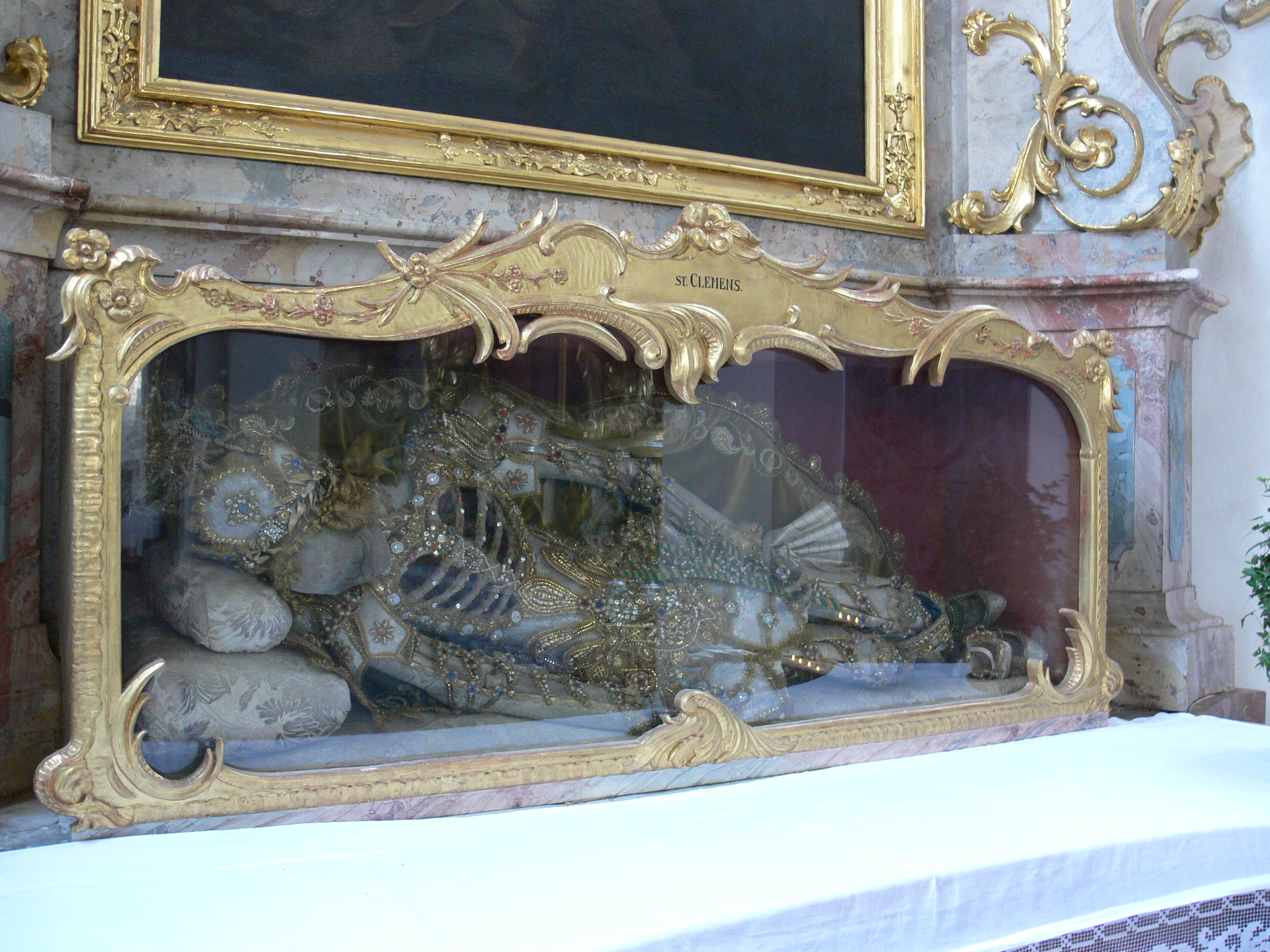
The sarcophagus of "Saint Clemens"

The church also contains a purported relic of Saint Clemens that is an example of a so-called catacomb saint, a corpse that has been taken from the Roman Catacombs, decorated, given a fictitious name, and presented as the relic of a Roman Catholic saint.
