= Hypnospace Outlaw =

2019 video game

- Developer: Tendershoot
- Publisher: No More Robots
- Designer: Jay Tholen
- Programmers: Mike Lasch; Corey Cochran
- Artist: Jay Tholen
- Writers: Jay Tholen; Xalavier Nelson Jr.
- Composer: Jay Tholen
- Engine: Construct 2
- Platforms: Windows, macOS, Linux, Nintendo Switch, PlayStation 4, Xbox One, iOS, Android
- Release: Windows, macOS, Linux; March 12, 2019; Switch, PS4, Xbox One; August 27, 2020; iOS, Android; July 23, 2026
- Genres: Simulation, puzzle
- Mode: Single-player

Hypnospace Outlaw is a 2019 simulation video game developed by Tendershoot and published by No More Robots. Set in an alternate history 1999, the game takes place inside a parody of the early Internet and its culture that users visit in their sleep called Hypnospace. The player assumes the role of an "Enforcer" for the fictional company Merchantsoft—creator of Hypnospace—and seeks to police illegal content, copyright violations, viruses, and cyberbullying by users on the service. In the process, the player engages in detective work and puzzle-solving. Hypnospace Outlaw was released for Windows, macOS, and Linux in March 2019 and for Nintendo Switch, PlayStation 4, and Xbox One in August 2020.

== Gameplay ==
Hypnospace Outlaw utilizes an interface based on that of a typical graphical interface for a desktop operating system, similar to the likes of Windows 9x, with the player using a fictional in-game "web browser" called Hypnospace Explorer, akin to the massively popular Internet Explorer. The mission is to discover and report objectionable content they have been assigned to investigate by Hypnospace staff. Many aspects of the story can be accessed in a non-linear fashion, and others are completely optional. Investigation of cases requires exploration of web pages and searching, aided by hints given by the content of the pages. HypnoCoin, the game's main currency is earned by reporting and closing assigned cases. This currency is exchanged for various downloadable programs, virtual pets, wallpapers, themes, and content that advance the story. It also features musical pastiches of popular bands of the era, with much of the soundtrack originating from in-game bands such as "Seepage", "Fre3zer", and the "Chowder Man".

== Plot ==
Hypnospace is an internet service created by Merchantsoft, which users connect to using a headband running the HypnOS operating system while they sleep. Hypnospace is divided into Zones for different audiences.

On November 5, 1999, a user logs into Hypnospace as an Enforcer, a volunteer moderator who finds and reports forbidden activity. After handling a few cases, Merchantsoft co-founder and COO Dylan Merchant releases an alpha version of his game Outlaw to all Enforcers; the extremely buggy build ultimately bricks the Enforcer's headband.

The Enforcer logs in again on November 26 after getting the headband fixed. A copyright infringement case leads the Enforcer to FLIST, a file sharing network commonly used to share copyrighted music. The Enforcer finds Dylan's FLIST page and reports it, causing Dylan to remove the Enforcer from duty.

The Enforcer is reinstated on December 31 to help deal with the Y2000 Mindcrash, a mostly harmless hack of the Teentopia Zone created by Timothy Randall Stevens (T1MAGEDDON). The Mindcrash is fixed without much harm done. Dylan pushes another version of Outlaw to all headbands, which crashes all of them and causes four to six deaths (depending on the Enforcer's previous actions). Timothy is blamed for the "real" Mindcrash and is sentenced to prison for manslaughter, and Hypnospace is shut down.

In the present day, the Enforcer joins the Hypnospace Archival Project, an effort to preserve Hypnospace's final months. Former Merchantsoft employee Samantha Clausson created the project to prove that Timothy was framed for the Mindcrash, and the true cause was Merchantsoft's negligence. They find records of Merchantsoft's foreknowledge that Hypnospace was harmful to users. Dylan, who joins the Archival Project himself, admits to framing Timothy, and releases a final version of Outlaw containing eulogies for those who died.

== Development ==
Hypnospace Outlaw was designed by Jay Tholen, creator of the earlier game Dropsy. The new game was funded via a successful Kickstarter campaign, and was a finalist for the Independent Game Festival's 2019 Seumas McNally Grand Prize and "Excellence in Audio". It was released for Windows, macOS, and Linux on March 12, 2019, and for Nintendo Switch, PlayStation 4, and Xbox One on August 27, 2020. A free content update was released for the PC versions alongside the console releases.

== Reception ==
Reception

Aggregate score
Aggregator	Score
Metacritic	(PC) 83/100 (NS) 84/100

Review scores
Publication	Score
Adventure Gamers	4.5/5
Computer Games Magazine	8.5/10
Eurogamer	Recommended
Game Informer	8.5/10
GameRevolution	8/10
GameSpot	8/10
Nintendo Life	9/10
Nintendo World Report	8/10
PC Gamer (US)	81/100
Shacknews	9/10
The Guardian	4/5
VideoGamer.com	9/10

The game received "generally positive reviews" according to review aggregator site Metacritic. It was nominated for the Tin Pan Alley Award for Best Music in a Game, the Statue of Liberty Award for Best World, and the Herman Melville Award for Best Writing at the New York Game Awards. PC Gamer stated "it's a nice reminder of when the internet felt like a cool underground club, rather than a pervasive Hell from which there is no escape." Both TheGamer and Eurogamer mention the sense of nostalgia that the game brings.

== Follow-ups ==
A sequel, Dreamsettler, and a spinoff first-person shooter, Slayers X: Terminal Aftermath: Vengance of the Slayer [sic], were both announced in 2022.

=== Slayers X ===
Slayers X is a first-person shooter spinoff of Hypnospace Outlaw. The game is set in-universe as a creation by the character Zane, who appears in Hypnospace Outlaw. The game was released on June 1, 2023, for Microsoft Windows and Xbox Series X and S.

=== Dreamsettler ===
Dreamsettler was a planned sequel to Hypnospace Outlaw, set between 2003 and 2005 and depicting the Internet of the time. The player would have assumed the role of a "private investigator" building up their reputation. The game was cancelled on June 20, 2025.
