= Nowhere Prophet =

2019 video game

- Developer: Sharkbomb Studios
- Publisher: No More Robots
- Designer: Martin Nerurkar
- Programmer: Martin Nerurkar
- Artists: Anjin Anhut; Casey Parkhurst; Jack Allen
- Composer: Mike Beaton
- Engine: Unity
- Platforms: Windows, macOS, Linux, Nintendo Switch, PlayStation 4, Xbox One
- Release: Windows, macOS, Linux; July 19, 2019; Switch, PS4, Xbox One; July 20, 2020
- Genre: Roguelike deck-building
- Mode: Single-player

Nowhere Prophet is a roguelike deck-building game developed by German developer Sharkbomb Studios and published by No More Robots. The game was first released in early access for Microsoft Windows, macOS, and Linux in October 2017 on Itch.io. The game was fully released for these platforms in July 2019. A version for PlayStation 4, Nintendo Switch and Xbox One followed in July 2020.

== Gameplay ==
In Nowhere Prophet, the player takes on the role of a prophet and attempts to lead a convoy of outcasts through a hostile, procedurally generated environment in search for a mystical, safe place. On this journey the player has to manage resources and to battle through enemies and bosses. This combat is resolved with a collectible card game-based system, where the skills of the prophet and the members of the convoy are represented by cards. During the journey the prophet can improve their skills and the convoy can grow, giving the player access to a wider card pool from which to build their decks.

== Development ==
Nowhere Prophet was designed and developed by Martin Nerurkar over a five-year span. The development was begun in 2015 under the working title Burning Roads and was supported with public funding from the German state of Baden-Württemberg. During development the combat system was completely changed from a system involving multiple party members to the grid-based combat it ultimately released with.

According to an article from developer Martin Nerurkar, the game's First Access release on Itch.io sold 136 copies in the first five weeks, eventually growing to 450 copies over the next six months. During this time the game was featured in articles on Rock Paper Shotgun.

== Reception ==
Reception

Aggregate score
Aggregator	Score
Metacritic	PC: 73/100; NS: 81/100

Nowhere Prophet has an aggregate score of 73/100 on Metacritic, described as "mixed to average reviews". Some of the issues noted by critics were the high difficulty and the AI behavior. Matt Cox of Rock Paper Shotgun called the game "worth exploring for its world and its storytelling", but criticized the combat, calling the AI "wonky". Edge rated the game 50/100, comparing the combat to "playing against an opponent who overturns the table when they win". Miguel Solo of Meristation rated the game 7.8/10, calling the combat innovative and the game itself heavily replayable, but also saying that the progression was unclear and it could use maps with more alternative routes.

=== Awards and accolades ===
Year	Award	Category	Result	Ref
2019	Animated Games Award Germany	Visual Design & Aesthetics	Nominated	
2020	GermanDevDays Award	Best Story	Nominated	
2020	GermanDevDays Award	Best Sound	Nominated	
2020	GermanDevDays Award	Best Game Mechanics	Nominated	
2020	GermanDevDays Award	Best Game	Nominated	
2021	Deutscher Entwicklerpreis	Best Game Design	Nominated	
