= The Order of the Good Death =

Death-positivity group

The Order of the Good Death is a death acceptance organization founded in 2011 by mortician and author Caitlin Doughty. The group advocates for natural burial and embracing human mortality.

Along with Doughty, members include Sarah Chavez, Director of The Order of the Good Death, Megan Rosenbloom, Director of Death Salon, and Amber Carvaly, Director of Undertaking LA. Other notable members are artist and monument-maker Greg Lundgren, TED speaker Jae Rhim Lee, alternative funeral home director Jeff Jorgenson, artist Landis Blair, forensic pathologist Judy Melinek, author and photographer Paul Koudounaris, and other death professionals, artists and academics.

The group held its first "death salon" in Los Angeles in 2013. Another salon was held in 2014 at St Bartholomew's Hospital Pathology Museum in London by museum curator Carla Valentine.

The group took its name from the Brazilian Order of Our Lady of the Good Death.

== Death-positive movement ==
The term "death positive" has been used by Doughty as a play on the term sex positive. The death-positive movement is a social and philosophical movement that encourages people to speak openly about death, dying, and corpses. The movement seeks to eliminate the silence around death-related topics, decrease anxiety surrounding death, and encourages more diversity in end-of-life care options available to the public.

However, the ideas behind the movement have existed much longer. The Order of the Good Death website lists the beliefs of the death-positive movement as being that cultural censorship of death and dying does more harm than good, that open discussions about death should be accepted as a natural human curiosity, that families should have full rights to care for the bodies of their loved ones without intervention from funeral businesses, and that end of life care should be diversified and performed in ways that cause less damage to the environment than current practices. The movement encourages participants to speak to their families about their own end of life wishes, even if they are young and healthy, and is critical of the commercialized funeral industry. It also encourages people to express their feelings about death through art.

Organizations such as Going with Grace, founded by death midwife Alua Arthur, are contributing to the movement through their online courses and End of Life Training Program. In 2021, Arthur and Doughty launched a new online course, Mortal, giving an opportunity for students to explore their own mortalities. End Well, founded by physician and film producer Shoshana R. Ungerleider, hosts an annual conference and media platform to highlight solutions to make the end of life experience more human-centered. Death Over Dinner, founded by restaurateur and author Michael Hebb along with Angel Grant, is an organization that encourages people to have dinner parties to talk about mortality which has facilitated more than 200,000 dinners.

The creators of the video game Death and Taxes identify with the death-positive movement.

== See also ==
- Death education
- Death midwife
