= Slayers X: Terminal Aftermath: Vengance of the Slayer =

- Developer: Big Z Studios Inc.
- Publisher: No More Robots
- Series: Hypnospace Outlaw
- Engine: Unity
- Platforms: Windows; Xbox One; Xbox Series X/S; Nintendo Switch; PlayStation 4; PlayStation 5
- Release: Windows, Xbox One, Xbox Series X/S; June 1, 2023; Nintendo Switch, PlayStation 4, PlayStation 5; May 15, 2024
- Genre: First-person shooter
- Mode: Single-player

Slayers X: Terminal Aftermath: Vengance of the Slayer (simply titled Slayers X) is a first-person shooter video game developed by Tendershoot (as Big Z Studios Inc.) and published by No More Robots on Windows, Xbox One, and Xbox Series X/S on June 1, 2023. It is a followup to the 90s web simulation video game, Hypnospace Outlaw, and was revealed alongside the sequel to Hypnospace Outlaw, Dreamsettler. In the universe of these games, Slayers X is a game made by the fictional character Zane Lofton, who put himself in the role of the protagonist of Slayers X.

Slayers X has received generally positive reception, holding generally favorable reviews according to Metacritic. Rock Paper Shotgun writer Liam Richardson was particularly enthusiastic, identifying it as one of his favorite indie games of 2023.

== Synopsis ==
Slayers X is a first-person shooter, more specifically a "boomer shooter" (a shooter which derives inspiration from classic 90s video games similar to the likes of Duke Nukem 3D and Redneck Rampage). In-universe, the game is a total conversion modification for one of Zane's favourite videogames, Kataklysm, and was developed by Zane partially in the 1990s, and finished in 2023 with help from his friend Adam Chase. Despite now being 38, Zane is depicted as being immature for his age, as such, the game contains many deliberate spelling errors and malapropisms in line with this.

Inspired by Zane's teenage comics, Slayers X depicts Zane as a member of a secretive organisation of vigilantes known as the X-Slayers, who are users of the mystical "hackblood." The story begins with Zane being attacked by a gang of mutants known as the "Psyko Sindikate [sic]". The Sindikate explode Zane's apartment and mother, hack his computer, kill his mentor, Mikey Sikey, and kidnap fellow X-Slayer Steffanie. Driven by a thirst for revenge, Zane battles hordes of Psykos as well as their leader Mevin Raniels (based heavily on Zane's former in-universe boss and stepfather).

The game's levels are inspired by Zane's hometown of Boise, Idaho and include various locations that he frequents. References can also be found throughout the game to elements of the universe established in Hypnospace Outlaw. This includes the soundtrack, which was created by the in-universe band "Seepage" (in turn inspired by real-life bands such as Linkin Park).

== Announcement and release ==
Slayers X is a followup to the video game Hypnospace Outlaw, announced alongside a sequel to that game, Dreamsettler. Slayers X released on June 1, 2023 for Windows and Xbox Series X/S. On the same day, it was made available on the Xbox Game Pass subscription service.

On May 8, 2024, No More Robots announced that the game would be coming to Nintendo Switch and PlayStation consoles on May 15. Alongside that, an extra campaign was teased.

== Reception ==
Reception

Aggregate score
Aggregator	Score
Metacritic	80/100

Slayers X has received generally positive reception, with the PC version of the game receiving generally favorable reviews according to Metacritic. Before the game released, Rock Paper Shotgun Liam Richardson was optimistic about it, saying the demo was "exactly what I hoped it would be." PC Gamer writer Rich Stanton felt that despite there being a fair number of retro-style FPS games and finding the humor "love it or hate it," he nevertheless found it "kinda charming."

Upon release, Richardson praised it as an accurate depiction of what teens found cool back in the 2000s, and praised it for feeling so similar to the build engine despite not using it. He also regarded it as one of his favorite indie games of 2023. TechRadar writer Jordan Forward-Lamb felt that, despite difficulty spikes and "frustratingly old-school FPS design," he appreciated how creative it was and how it replicated the "90s setting." Destructoid writer Zoey Handley felt that the game was lacking in a lot of ways, including being too short, having too few enemies and weapons, and having bad flow, though she noted that some of the game's flaws may be deliberately done. Despite this, she found the game enjoyable due to its "fascinating character exploration of its fictional designer Zane, particularly how much of himself he puts into the game. DualShockers writer Robert Zak noted that the protagonist was like a "younger less studly brother of fellow 90s quipper Duke Nukem," though finding some of his dialogue "grating." Despite issues with the game, he found the repetitive gameplay and "ever-intoxicating nostalgia" enjoyable.
