= Paul Koudounaris =

American author and photographer

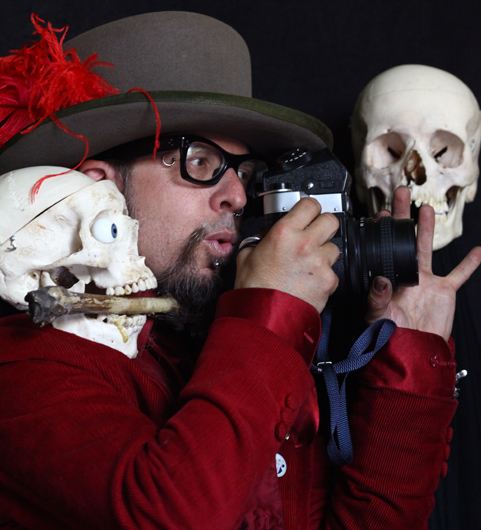
Paul Koudounaris in 2011

Paul Koudounaris is an American author and photographer originally from Los Angeles and currently living in Las Vegas. He has a PhD in Art History, and his publications in the field of charnel house and ossuary research have made him a well-known figure in the field of macabre art and art history. He is also a feline historian whose book entitled, A Cat's Tale, told feline history in the voice of his rescue cat, Baba the Cat. In addition he is one of the world's leading experts on pet cemeteries and animal burials, and his book on this topic was announced in 2024 for a fall release under the title Faithful Unto Death, He is a member of The Order of the Good Death.

== Research and publications on human remains in religious art ==
In 2006, he started extensively studying the use of human remains in religious ritual and as a decorative element in sacred spaces. He began writing about and photographing them for European newspapers, and became an important contributor to magazines which specialize in the paranormal, such as the Fortean Times, covering unusual and spiritual phenomenon surrounding sacred remains throughout the world. In the process, he also compiled material for the first ever history of bone-decorated religious structures, visiting over 70 sites on four continents, some of which had never before been photographed or open to the public.

== The Empire of Death ==
In 2011, his ossuary research and photographs were published by Thames and Hudson as The Empire of Death, the title taken from a caption at the Catacombs of Paris, one of the sites included in the book. The book included other famous ossuaries, such as the Sedlec Ossuary and the crypt of Santa Maria della Concezione dei Cappuccini, where he had been granted special permission by the monastery and Italian cultural authorities to photograph. A host of similar, previously unknown sites were also included in the book, however, and the text created a context for understanding the construction of these types of elaborate ossuaries as a Catholic phenomenon that was initiated during the Counter-Reformation. The book received extensive media coverage, and was lauded in publications internationally and was named among the best books of the year by the London Evening Standard and awarded Coup de Coeur by the Association of Paris Librarians.

== Heavenly Bodies ==
His book Heavenly Bodies was released in 2013, and delved even deeper into study of obscure macabre art history by presenting the forgotten story of a group of skeletons taken from the Roman Catacombs in the seventeenth century and completely decorated with jewels by teams of nuns. The book described how these bodies, known as catacomb saints, were identified as Early Christian martyrs, then sent primarily to German-speaking lands where they were decorated and placed into Catholic Churches. Such skeletons were mostly removed and destroyed during the Enlightenment, but Koudounaris tracked down all the surviving examples and photographed them for the book. The book received a tremendous amount of press, and Koudounaris was dubbed "Indiana Bones" by the UK press, in reference to his curious and macabre discoveries, and the book was named by Dazed and Confused as one of the ten best art and photography books of the year.

== Memento Mori ==
The third book by Koudounaris on macabre visual culture involving human remains was released in 2015 and entitled Memento Mori. In interviews for the book he indicated that it was intended to present a much more global perspective than the previous books by including lengthy sections involving material from Africa, Asia, and South America—especially from the country of Bolivia, where he had been studying skull rituals (involving an annual festival to skulls called Natitas in La Paz) for the last ten years. He said that unlike the previous books, this one was primarily a photographic rather than historical and anthropological study, and that he intended it to be his final work on sacred human remains. The book garnered honors as one of American Photo magazine's ten best new photography books.

== A Cat's Tale ==
Koudounaris has long been interested in animal history, and as a follow-up to his death books he planned initially to write a history of pet cemeteries. During the research, however, he became aware of how many exceptional stories of heroic animals had been left out of standard history books, especially involving cats. He had previously been involved in cat rescue, and owned a tabby named Baba with whom he had already commenced a photograph series of costumes. Acquiring mostly old doll and teddy bear costumes, Koudounaris would tailor them for Baba, who would model famous historical characters and popular culture figures. Koudounaris decided that instead of writing the pet cemetery book, he would write a feline history book, but using Baba as the narrator, and illustrating the book with her wearing costumes of the historical eras she discusses. The result was A Cat's Tale: A Journey Through Feline History, released in November, 2020. Baba was listed as the co-author. The approach of attempting to tell history from a cat's point of view, and in a feline voice, was novel, and A Cat's Tale was lauded by Smithsonian Magazine as "The most unique cat history book ever published," and selected by Barnes and Noble as one of the best new books of 2020.

== Research on sex ghosts and demonic cats ==
During the research for The Empire of Death, he acquired huge amounts of corollary folklore relating to different macabre subjects. One of these was otherworldly erotic encounters between the living and dead. He refers to the phenomenon as Sex Ghosts, but indicates the history of this type of encounter can be dated all the way to the ancient world. While it is now attributed to ghosts, he says it has previously been attributed to any number of sources. He has given public discussion of the topic internationally, and has done several interviews touching on the subject. He also began to research folklore about demonically-possessed cats, and has done interviews and lectures about this topic around the USA. He is also the author of A Cat's Tale: A Journey Through Feline History.
