= No More Robots =

British video game publisher

No More Robots Ltd
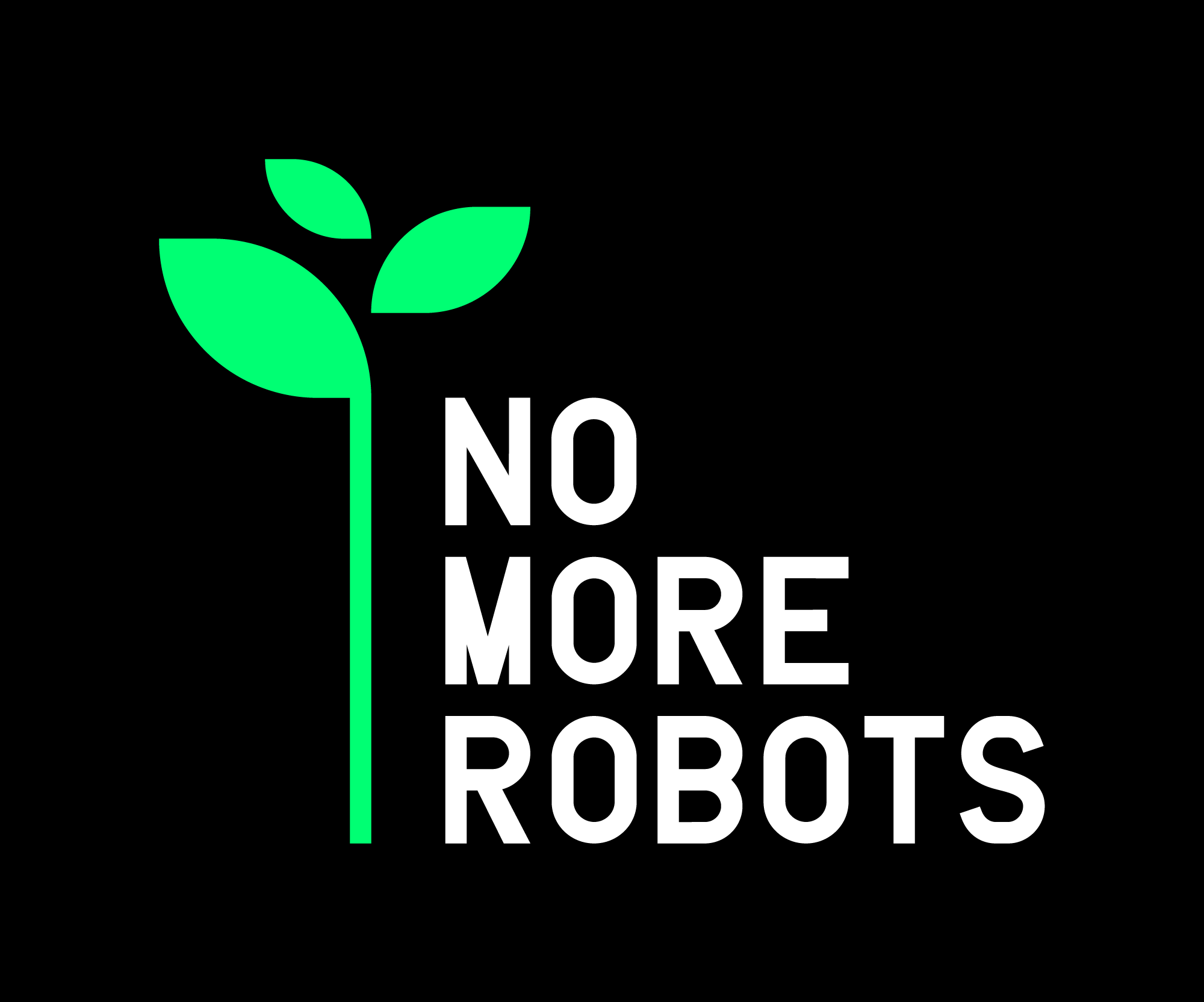
- Type: Private
- Industry: Video games
- Founded: 2017; 9 years ago
- Founders: Mike Rose; Simon Carless; Jas Purewal
- Headquarters: Manchester, UK
- Number of locations: 1 office (2019)
- Area served: Worldwide
- Key people: Mike Rose (Director)
- Number of employees: 13 (2022)
- Website: nomorerobots.io

No More Robots Ltd is a British video game publisher and developer based in Manchester, England. The company was founded by Mike Rose, previously of publishing company tinyBuild, alongside investors Simon Carless and Jas Purewal. The publishing label originally found success with digital games Not Tonight and Descenders, and now works with various development studios for titles across PC and console gaming platforms.

== Operations and Publishing ==
Following the success of Descenders, No More Robots published management simulator Not Tonight, which was widely covered in the mainstream media for its dystopian take on Brexit. In 2019, the publishing label released Independent Games Festival-nominated operating system simulator Hypnospace Outlaw and card-based roguelike Nowhere Prophet. In 2020, No More Robots released kingdom management sim Yes, Your Grace, and life simulator Family Man.

Founder Mike Rose spoke on the state of indie publishing, the industry, and the company in a 2024 interview. Rose stated that smaller publishers need to look at the long term without obsessing over exponential growth. No More Robots' approach focuses on "pragmatic survival" in favor of topping sales charts.

The company announced their first self-developed game with the 2026 management simulator Cruise Control.

== Games published ==
| Year | Title | Genre(s) | Platform(s) | Developer(s) |
|---|---|---|---|---|
| 2018 | Descenders | Sports, roguelike | Linux, macOS, Microsoft Windows, Xbox One, PlayStation 4, Nintendo Switch, IOS, Android | RageSquid |
| 2018 | Not Tonight | Role-playing, simulation | Microsoft Windows, Nintendo Switch | PanicBarn |
| 2019 | Hypnospace Outlaw | Simulation | Linux, macOS, Microsoft Windows, Nintendo Switch, Xbox One, PlayStation 4 | Tendershoot, Michael Lasch, ThatWhichIs Media |
| 2019 | Nowhere Prophet | Roguelike deck-building game | Linux, macOS, Microsoft Windows, Nintendo Switch, Xbox One, PlayStation 4 | Sharkbomb Studios |
| 2020 | Family Man | First-person shooter, role-playing | Microsoft Windows, Xbox One, Nintendo Switch | Broken Bear Games |
| 2020 | Yes, Your Grace | Role-playing | Microsoft Windows, Nintendo Switch, Xbox One, Xbox Series X/S | Brave at Night |
| 2021 | Let's Build a Zoo | Construction and management sim | Microsoft Windows, Xbox One, Xbox Series X/S, PlayStation 4, PlayStation 5, Nintendo Switch | Springloaded |
| 2021 | Heist Simulator | Simulation | Microsoft Windows, Google Stadia | SkyBagel, RogueCode |
| 2022 | Not Tonight 2 | Role-playing, simulation | Microsoft Windows, Nintendo Switch | PanicBarn |
| 2022 | TombStar | Roguelike, twin-stick shooter | Microsoft Windows | Andy Sum, Marcus Grambau |
| 2022 | Fashion Police Squad | First-person shooter | Microsoft Windows, Nintendo Switch, Xbox One, Xbox Series X/S, PlayStation 4, PlayStation 5 | Mopeful Games |
| 2022 | Soccer Story | Role-playing video game | Microsoft Windows, Nintendo Switch, Xbox One, Xbox Series X/S, PlayStation 4, PlayStation 5 | PanicBarn |
| 2023 | Slayers X: Terminal Aftermath: Vengance of the Slayer | First-person shooter | Microsoft Windows, Xbox One, Xbox Series X/S, Nintendo Switch, PlayStation 4, PlayStation 5 | Tendershoot |
| 2023 | Spirittea | Role-playing video game | Microsoft Windows, Nintendo Switch, Xbox One, Xbox Series X/S | Cheesemaster Games |
| 2025 | Descenders Next | Sports | Microsoft Windows, Xbox One, Xbox Series X/S, PlayStation 4, PlayStation 5 | RageSquid |
| 2025 | Starless Abyss | Roguelike deck-building game | Microsoft Windows | Konafa Games |
| 2025 | Little Rocket Lab | Construction sim, Cozy game | Microsoft Windows, Xbox One, Xbox Series X/S, Nintendo Switch, Nintendo Switch 2 | Teenage Astronauts |
| 2026 | Earth Must Die | Adventure | Microsoft Windows, Nintendo Switch, PlayStation 5 | Size Five Games |
| 2026 | Piece by Piece | Simulation | Microsoft Windows, Nintendo Switch | Gamkat |
| 2026 | Thank You For Your Application | Point-and-click adventure | Microsoft Windows | IceLemonTea Studio |
| 2026 | Piece by Piece (2nd title with same name) | Puzzle platformer | Nintendo Switch, Nintendo Switch 2 | Neon Polygons |
| 2026 | Manifesto | Management simulation | Microsoft Windows | Breakpoint Games |
| 2027 | Really Illegal Golf | Multiplayer, Stealth, Sports | Microsoft Windows | Pushlab Games |
| 2027 | Another Door | Multiplayer, Roguelike | Microsoft Windows | (France) Mizar and Alcor Interactive |
| 2027 | Oddbat | Metroidvania | Microsoft Windows | (Spain) Summerhouse Games |
| TBA | Cruise Control | Simulation | Microsoft Windows | No More Robots |
| Cancelled | Dreamsettler | Simulation | Microsoft Windows | Tendershoot, Noble Robot |
