= Johann Georg Fischer (architect) =

German stonemason and architect

- Born: 21 January 1673; Marktoberdorf
- Died: 26 April 1747 (aged 74); Füssen
- Resting place: St. Sebastian cemetery
- Occupation: Architect

Johann Georg Fischer (21 January 1673 – 26 April 1747) was a stonemason and builder. He stood for a long time in the shadow of his famous uncle, Johann Jakob Herkomer (1652–1717).

Fischer's son Franz Karl later stepped into his father's professional footsteps.

His works include the Parish church of St. Gallus and Ulrich in Kißlegg, where there is also a road named after him.
