= Georg Zürn =

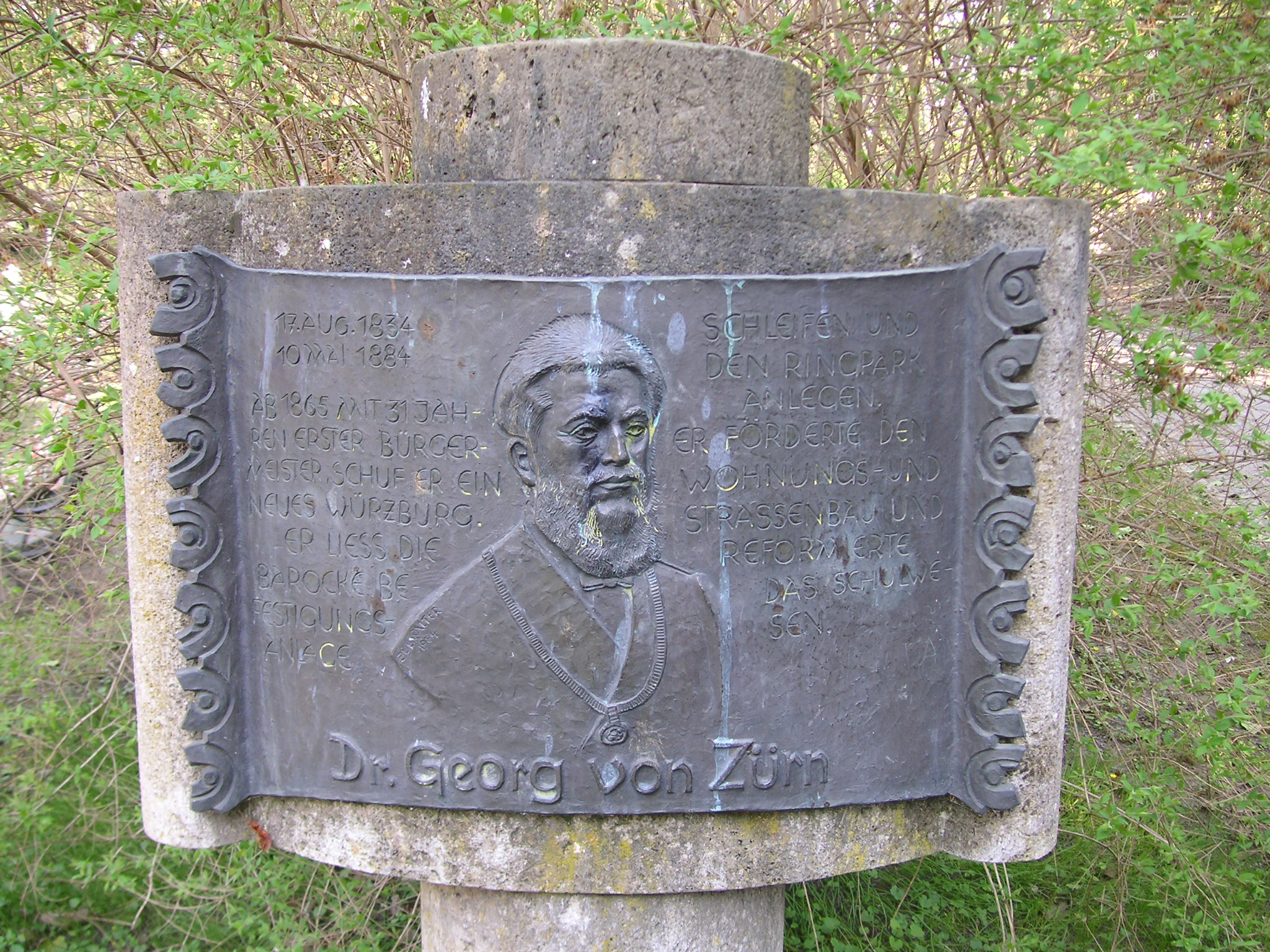
Memorial to Georg Zürn in the Ringpark, Würzburg, Germany

Dr. Georg von Zürn (17 August 1834 – 10 May 1884) was the mayor (German: Bürgermeister) of Würzburg, Germany from 1865 to 1884.

== Early life ==
George Zürn was born in 1834 in Würzburg, Germany and was the eldest son of a bookbinder. He studied law and political science, and then worked as a lawyer in nearby Bamberg. In 1865 incumbent mayor Jacob Hopfenstätter died, offering Zürn a chance to return to his hometown. Against qualified competition, on 7 December 1865 Zürn was unanimously elected to the position of mayor at the age of 31.

== Work ==
During his long tenure he promoted housing and road building, reformed the school system, and created the Ring Park around the old town.

The preceding Thirty years war had continuously devoured Würzburg's finances and resulted in an expansive system of fortifications that blocked the spatial growth of the city. Traffic was impeded and building restrictions restricted industrial and commercial life. The subsequent shelling of the city by the Prussians in the Austro-Prussian War of 1866 clearly showed that the old fortifications offered no military protection. Zürn then spearheaded difficult negotiations to remove the fortifications on the right of the Main River. He also managed to buy the entire old railway station on the site of today's Louis Street, which was conceived as upper-class residential road. He leveled the city gates obstructing traffic, broke through the walls to create new radial roads, and created the main ring road. A new park design, including a new city office of dedicated gardener, resulted in an advanced park system for its time.

These changes resulted in tremendous growth of the city. Of 33,414 persons in 1867, the population increased to 54,457 in 1890. As a visible expression of his services, Zürn received two orders from the Ludwig II of Bavaria. Typical of his modesty, he refused an offer for admission to Bavarian nobility. In 1870 he was awarded honorary citizenship of the town.
