= Papers, Please =

2013 puzzle simulation video game

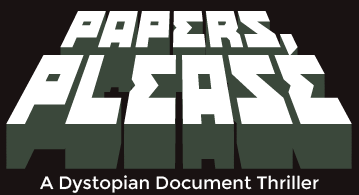
- Developer: 3909
- Publisher: 3909
- Designer: Lucas Pope
- Engine: Unity (Note: The PC version of the game initially used OpenFL (with Haxe) but was later brought in line with the Android and iOS versions of the game which used Unity.)
- Platforms: Microsoft Windows, OS X, Linux, iOS, PlayStation Vita, Android
- Release: Windows, OS X; August 8, 2013; Linux; February 12, 2014; iPad; December 12, 2014; PlayStation Vita; December 12, 2017; Android, iPhone; August 5, 2022
- Genres: Puzzle, simulation
- Mode: Single-player

Papers, Please is a 2013 puzzle simulation video game by Lucas Pope, developed and published independently through his production company 3909. The game was released on August 8, 2013, for Microsoft Windows and OS X, for Linux on February 12, 2014, and for iOS on December 12, 2014. A port for the PlayStation Vita was announced in August 2014 and was then released on December 12, 2017. A port for Android, alongside an updated port for iOS, was released in August 2022.

In Papers, Please, the player takes the role of a border-crossing immigration officer in the fictional dystopian country of Arstotzka, which maintains a longstanding state of mutual political hostility with its neighboring countries. The player must review travelers' passports and other supporting paperwork against an ever-growing list of rules using a number of tools and guides. Tasks include allowing in those with the proper paperwork while rejecting those without all proper documents, detaining those with falsified information, and balancing personal finances.

Papers, Please was positively received on its release, and it has come to be seen as an example of an empathy game and a demonstration of video games as an art form. It is considered one of the greatest video games of all time. The game earned various awards and nominations from the Independent Games Festival, Game Developers Choice Awards, and BAFTA Video Games Awards, and was named by Wired and The New Yorker as one of the top games of 2013. By its tenth anniversary, Papers, Please had sold more than five million copies.

== Gameplay ==
Papers, Please depicts the life of an immigration inspector at a border checkpoint for the fictional country of Arstotzka in the year 1982. Arstotzka has recently ended a six-year-long war with the neighboring country of Kolechia, yet political tensions between them and other nearby countries remain high.

As a checkpoint inspector, the player must review the documents of arrivals – allowing legitimate travelers through the border, denying entry to those with insufficient or expired documents, and arresting suspected criminals, terrorists, and entrants with forged or stolen documents. For each in-game day, the player is given specific rules on what documentation is required and conditions to allow entry, which become progressively more difficult over time. One by one, immigrants arrive at the checkpoint and provide their paperwork, which must be reviewed against the scheduled rules. If discrepancies are discovered, the player may interrogate the applicant, demand missing documents, compare the applicant's fingerprints against identity records, and order full body scans. If incriminating evidence is discovered, the player may order the entrant arrested. The player ultimately must stamp the entrant's passport to accept or deny entry, or order an arrest. If the player has violated protocol, a citation will be issued via in-game fax to the player's booth shortly after the entrant leaves. The player has a limited amount of real time, representing a full day shift at the checkpoint, to process as many arrivals as possible.

The player's immigration checkpoint workstation shows the current arrival (left center), the various paperwork the player is currently processing (bottom right), and the current state of the checkpoint (top third). A body scan of the arrival reveals a concealed firearm.

At the end of each in-game day, the player earns money per entrant that is properly processed as well as from any bribes collected, lowered by citation penalties for protocol violations. The player then must decide on a simple budget for rent, food, heat and other necessities for their family; if the player goes into debt, the game ends with a game over. Accepting bribes risks being discovered and imprisoned by the government. As relations between Arstotzka and nearby countries deteriorate, new rules are added such as denying entry to citizens of specific countries or demanding new types of documentation. The player may be challenged with moral dilemmas as the game progresses, such as allowing the supposed spouse of an immigrant through despite lacking complete papers at the risk of accepting a terrorist into the country. The game uses a mix of scripted encounters interspersed between randomly generated entrants.

Over the course of the game, the player encounters members of an organization called EZIC which plots a coup d'état against the Arstotzkan government. Decisions made to grant or deny entry to EZIC agents have consequences on the ending of the game. The player can also choose to escape to a neighbouring country, Obristan, to start a new life, with or without their family. The game has a scripted story mode with twenty possible endings depending on the player's actions, as well as some unlockable randomized endless-play modes.

== Development ==
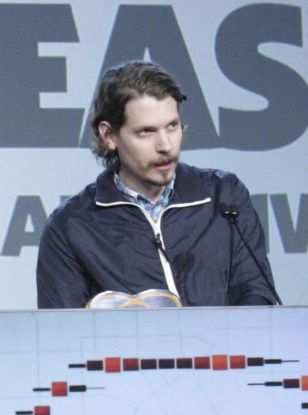
Lucas Pope accepting an award for the game at the 2014 Game Developers Conference

Papers, Please was developed by Lucas Pope, a former developer for Naughty Dog on the Uncharted series. Around 2010, after the release of Uncharted 2: Among Thieves, Pope left the company to move to Saitama, Japan, with his wife Keiko, a game designer herself. The move was partly to be closer to Keiko's family, but also driven by Pope's desire to pursue smaller, independent projects. While at Naughty Dog, he had been working with Keiko on side projects and wanted to move away from the "definite formula" of the Uncharted games to explore more experimental ideas. The couple worked on a few independent titles and briefly relocated to Singapore to assist a friend with another project. From his travels in Asia and return visits to the United States, Pope became fascinated with immigration and passport control work, observing that inspectors had "a specific thing they're doing and they're just doing it over and over again." He recognized that the "tense" experience of checking passports could form the basis of a fun game.

Although he had designed the passport-checking mechanics early on, Pope initially lacked a narrative to support them. Inspiration came from films like Argo and the Bourne series, which feature characters infiltrating or escaping countries using forged documents. Pope decided to flip the scenario, casting the player as the immigration officer tasked with catching such individuals, complementing his gameplay mechanics. He created the fictional totalitarian state of Arstotzka, set in 1982 and modeled loosely on Eastern Bloc nations, with players instructed to uphold the country's glory through rigorous passport inspections. Arstotzka drew partial inspiration from Pope's earlier game The Republia Times, where players act as a newspaper editor in a totalitarian state. He also incorporated elements inspired by the Berlin Wall and the division between East and West Germany, admitting he was "naturally attracted to Orwellian communist bureaucracy." However, to avoid direct political commentary, he deliberately omitted obvious references like the word "comrade" in all translations. Using a fictional setting gave him freedom to shape the narrative without real-world constraints or assumptions.

Work on Papers, Please began in November 2012, funded by Pope's personal savings from his time at Naughty Dog. He originally expected development to take only a few weeks before moving on to a more commercially viable project. He used the open-source Haxe programming language and the NME framework, building upon structures he and Keiko had developed for Helsing's Fire, an iOS game they created after moving to Japan. This allowed him to control how much information about a character was visible and to design random and semi-random encounters, ensuring each playthrough varied slightly. The game's "clunky" user interface was a deliberate design choice, inspired by Pope's earlier experiences with visual programming tools like HyperCard. Balancing rules and randomness without overwhelming the player proved challenging, leading him to scale back some initially planned randomness. Pope aimed for a non-judgmental narrative, letting players interpret events themselves. Even elements like the family status screen at the end of each day were kept simple to avoid swaying players' feelings too much.

Throughout development, Pope shared updates on the independent game development forum TIGSource, receiving helpful feedback. He also released a public demo, which gained positive attention. In April 2013, he submitted the game to the Steam Greenlight program. Although initially concerned about its niche appeal, attention from YouTube streamers helped Papers, Please get greenlit within days. With increased visibility, Pope estimated six more months of development, though it ultimately took nine. He expanded the game by incorporating thousands of unique character names via a public submission process, although many submissions were unsuitable due to misunderstandings about the desired Eastern European style or joke entries. Following Greenlight success, Pope added features that introduced moral complexity, such as the controversial body scanner used to detect threats like suicide bombers. These additions served the narrative, explaining why the low-level inspector would be given such invasive tools. As Papers, Please gained recognition as an "empathy game," similar to Cart Life, changes were made to accommodate players who were less interested in narrative elements, such as an "endless mode" focused solely on processing immigrants, limited only by the player's error count.

== Release ==
Papers, Please was released for Windows and macOS on August 8, 2013, and for Linux machines on February 12, 2014. Pope later ported the game to iPad and considered a PlayStation Vita version, although adapting the interface for handhelds presented several challenges that would require revamps. The Vita version was formally announced at Gamescom 2014. During the iOS release process, however, Apple initially required Pope to censor the body scanner feature, considering it pornographic. However, Apple later commented that the rejection was due to a "misunderstanding" and allowed Pope to resubmit the uncensored game by including a "nudity option". The iPad version was released on December 12, 2014, and the Vita version was released on December 12, 2017. By March 2014, Pope admitted he was "kind of sick to death" of Papers, Please, feeling that he had spent far more time on it than originally intended. While he planned to continue supporting ports, he had no intentions of expanding the game or releasing downloadable content, though he did not rule out revisiting Arstotzka in a future project. On August 5, 2022, updated iOS and newly developed Android versions of Papers, Please were released, redesigned for smaller screens without the need for zooming. The iOS version was free for existing iPad owners. For the game's tenth anniversary, Pope released a free, browser-based demake styled as if running on an LCD handheld console.

== Reception ==
Reception

Aggregate score
| Aggregator | Score |
|---|---|
| Metacritic | PC: 85/100 iOS: 92/100 |

Review scores
| Publication | Score |
|---|---|
| Edge | 9/10 |
| Eurogamer | 9/10 |
| GameSpot | 8/10 |
| IGN | 8.7/10 |
| PC Gamer (US) | 87/100 |
| Polygon | 8/10 |
| TouchArcade | iOS: 5/5 |

Papers, Please received positive reviews on release, receiving "generally favorable reviews" from 40 reviews on Metacritic. Papers, Please has been praised for the sense of immersion provided by the game mechanics, and the intense emotional reaction it evokes in players. CBC News' Jonathan Ore called Papers, Please a "nerve-racking sleuthing game with relentless pacing and dozens of compelling characters – all from a desk job". Simon Parkin writing for The New Yorker blog declared Papers, Please the top video game of 2013. He wrote: "Grim yet affecting, it's a game that may change your attitude the next time you're in line at the airport." Some critics received the story very well: Ben "Yahtzee" Croshaw of The Escapist's series Zero Punctuation lauded the game for being a truly unique entry for 2013 and even made it one of his top five games for that year; he cited the game's morality as his reasoning by explaining that "[Papers, Please] presents us constant moral choices, but makes it really hard to be a good person... while you could waive the rules to reunite a couple [...] you do it at the expense of your own family... You have to decide if you want to create a better world or just look after you and yours."

Wired listed Papers, Please as their top game for 2013, recognizing that the game's title alongside the drab presentation captured the ideas of living as a lowly worker in a police state. In 2019, the game was ranked 45th on The Guardian newspaper's The 50 Best Video Games of the 21st Century list.

Some critics reacted against the paperwork gameplay. Stephanie Bendixsen from the Australian game review talk show Good Game found the game "tedious", commenting "while I found the issues that arose from the decisions you are forced to make quite interesting, I was just so bored that I just struggled to go from one day to the next. I was torn between wanting to find out more, and just wanting it all to stop."

Papers, Please is considered by several journalists as an example of video games as an art form. Papers, Please is frequently categorized as an "empathy game", a type of role-playing game that "asks players to inhabit their character's emotional worlds", as described by Patrick Begley of the Sydney Morning Herald, or as described by Pope himself, "other people simulators". Pope noted that he had not set out to make an empathy game, but the emotional ties created by his scenarios came about naturally from developing the core mechanics.

=== Awards ===
| Year | Award | Category | Result | Ref. |
|---|---|---|---|---|
| 2013 | VGX 2013 | Best Independent Game | Nominated | |
| 2013 | VGX 2013 | Best PC Game | Nominated | |
| 2014 | New York Game Awards | Off-Broadway Award for Best Indie Game | Nominated | |
| 2014 | 17th Annual D.I.C.E. Awards | Downloadable Game of the Year | Nominated | |
| 2014 | 17th Annual D.I.C.E. Awards | Outstanding Innovation in Gaming | Nominated | |
| 2014 | 17th Annual D.I.C.E. Awards | Outstanding Achievement in Game Direction | Nominated | |
| 2014 | SXSW Gaming Awards | Matthew Crump Cultural Innovation Award | Won | |
| 2014 | 10th British Academy Games Awards | Best Game | Nominated | |
| 2014 | 10th British Academy Games Awards | Game Design | Nominated | |
| 2014 | 10th British Academy Games Awards | Game Innovation | Nominated | |
| 2014 | 10th British Academy Games Awards | Strategy & Simulation | Won | |
| 2014 | Independent Games Festival Awards | Seumas McNally Grand Prize | Won | |
| 2014 | Independent Games Festival Awards | Excellence in Narrative | Won | |
| 2014 | Independent Games Festival Awards | Excellence in Design | Won | |
| 2014 | Independent Games Festival Awards | Nuovo Award | Nominated | |
| 2014 | Game Developers Choice Awards | Innovation Award | Won | |
| 2014 | Game Developers Choice Awards | Best Downloadable Game | Won | |
| 2014 | Games for Change Awards | Most Innovative | Won | |
| 2014 | Games for Change Awards | Best Gameplay | Won | |

Papers, Please won the Seumas McNally Grand Prize, "Excellence in Narrative", and "Excellence in Design" awards at the 2014 Independent Games Festival Awards and was nominated for the Nuovo Award. The title also won the "Innovation Award" and "Best Downloadable Game" at the 2014 Game Developers Choice Awards. The game won "Best Simulation Game" and was nominated in the categories of "Best Game", "Game Design", and "Game Innovation" at the 2014 BAFTA Video Games Awards. Papers, Please also won an Interactive Narrative and Game + Play Peabody Award in 2021.

=== Sales ===
As of March 2014, at the time of the BAFTA awards, Pope stated that the game had sold 500,000 copies. By August 2016, three years from release, Pope stated that more than 1.8 million copies had been sold across all platforms. By its tenth anniversary, the game had sold 5 million units.

== Short film adaptation ==
Two Russian filmmakers, Liliya Tkach and Nikita Ordynskiy of Kinodom Productions, developed an 11-minute live-action film based on Papers, Please, entitled Papers, Please: The Short Film, starring Igor Savochkin as the passport inspector. The film was authorized by Lucas Pope after Ordynskiy sent him the screenplay via email. It premiered at the Trekhgorka House of Culture in Moscow, Russia, on January 27, 2018. It debuted worldwide via YouTube and the Steam storefront on February 24, 2018. It received "Overwhelmingly Positive" reviews on Steam upon its release. Its success led Tkach and Ordynskiy to pursue a similar short film for Beholder, another game set in a totalitarian state. Ordynskiy would later voice Seaman Aleksei Toporov in Return of the Obra Dinn, a 2018 video game developed by Pope that was also a Seumas McNally Grand Prize winner.

The film follows a border inspector at the East Grestin checkpoint, much similar to the game. A soldier named Sergiu informs him that a Kolechian woman named Elisa will arrive and instructs him to permit her entry. When Elisa arrives, she lacks the proper entry permit, while the inspector receives directions not to permit any more Kolechian visitors. The inspector denies her entry, and she leaves him a heart-shaped locket to give to Sergiu. Later, an Obristani couple named Robynsky attempts to cross. There is a discrepancy in the wife's documents (where her surname is spelled "Robinsky" in her entry permit), but is dismissed as a typo, and they are allowed entry. Moments after passing, the couple (who are actually Kolechian agents) carries out a terrorist attack, killing several guards. The film ends with the inspector witnessing the aftermath of the bombing and Sergiu's execution by the husband, before being fatally shot himself.

== See also ==
- Contraband Police
- Death and Taxes
- Not Tonight
- Peace, Death!
- The Republia Times
- The Westport Independent
