= Peace, Death! =

2017 Russian video game

- Developer: AZAMATIKA
- Publishers: AZAMATIKA; HypeTrain Digital (Switch)
- Engine: GameMaker
- Platforms: Windows; Linux; Android; iOS; Nintendo Switch
- Release: Windows March 24, 2017; Linux March 29, 2017; Android, iOS October 23, 2017; Nintendo Switch EU: November 21, 2018 NA: December 14, 2018
- Genre: Simulation
- Mode: Single-player

Peace, Death! is a 2017 pixel art simulation game, developed and published by the Russian studio AZAMATIKA. The player controls Reaper, a novice worker of Death, who must examine the attributes of deceased characters and send them to their correct afterlife. The game is available on Windows, Linux, Android, iOS and Nintendo Switch.

== Gameplay ==
The gameplay consists of selecting who goes to Hell, Heaven or Purgatory, as accurately as possible and within a time limit.

In order to do it properly, the player must examine each individual and see what criteria they meet. Initially it is as simple as sending demons down to Hell on the left elevator and humans up to Heaven on the right elevator. However, new rules are added every day and the process of checking them gets increasingly more complex. The player can be asked, for example, to verify if someone is carrying a weapon or if their body is stained with blood, with both cases meaning the character is meant to be sent to Hell. Some crucial elements might be hidden with objects such as hats or glasses, which must be removed in order to make a proper judgment.

Each day has a set number of people to verify, after which the player receives rewards depending on their performance. If enough mistakes are made, a day can be failed midway.

After a certain point, Purgatory is added as a third destination for those who cannot go to either Heaven or Hell. The criteria include, for example, letting go of a weapon (which would otherwise result in Hell) or renouncing holy text (which would otherwise lead to Heaven) when the player left-clicks the corresponding character.

During work, the player might answer phone calls from colleagues asking for advice on certain decisions. They receive the description of an individual and must discern what is important and what is superfluous.

The game often presents bizarre visitors, including celebrity references.

== Plot ==
The protagonist, an unemployed Grim Reaper (also known simply as Reaper), is relaxing on their couch when their stomach growls. There is no food inside the fridge, and the character does not have enough money to order food either. They decide, thus, to apply for a job at Apocalypse Corporation, working primarily for Death.

Reaper can also work for other members of the Four Horsemen of the Apocalypse, who often make requests.

Their workplace is described as "beyond space and time".

After successfully completing seven weeks of a trial period, Reaper gets paid and is hired for a full-time job.

== Development and release ==
The head of the Russian studio AZAMATIKA, Azamat Baizulaev (also known as Azamat Zage), revealed his original plan was to make a sequel to his Western game Gun Done, with the same hero, but it did not work out. At the same time, he came across an online comment sarcastically asking his next game to not be called Peace, Death! (a Russian swear pun). The developer, instead, was motivated by the comment and began working on the title.

The title, born as a pun, virtually defined the early stages of development. Baizulaev expressed the desire to build something both Russian speakers and English speakers could enjoy. According to him, the central idea of the game remained mostly the same over time. He highlighted, however, how Reaper would originally give orders with a lever instead of his hands, which became visually problematic when Purgatory was added. In general terms, developing the idea of character attributes for the game took two months to be finished, the same amount of time spent writing the character lines.

The Hell element was originally inspired by traditional Christianity, due to its commonness. However, the final product ended up much more varied, including the Four Horsemen of the Apocalypse. Baizulaev denied any intentions to offend people with the title, claiming to have deliberately avoided certain topics. He also contradicted the idea of a deeper meaning for the game, calling it just casual entertainment.

He mentioned the multiple pop culture references were not supposed to be funny, or to boost their popularity, but simply a creative choice born out of personal preference. War, for example, was initially drawn as a fully armored Chaos follower (from the game Warhammer 40,000), but eventually had its design changed due to bureaucratic hurdles involving Games Workshop.

When asked about Papers, Please, Baizulaev stated he did not intend to create a "Russian response" to the game, while acknowledging the comparisons helped boost the popularity of Peace, Death!

The game was localized in French by Sébastien Sosa and Mate Lichtle, in German by Thomas H. (also known as Kyron) and in Brazilian Portuguese by Ruffles, HDD and Fire Borealis.

Peace, Death! was released on Steam for Windows on March 24, 2017, and five days later (on March 29, 2017) for Linux Ubuntu. It became available for both Android and iOS devices on October 23, 2017.

On November 22, 2017, Peace, Death! received downloadable content (DLC) on Steam, in the form of "Hand of F". It is an endless mode, with new mechanics and new characters. Its story takes place after the events of the original game, and presents Reaper with a new boss called Fate.

On November 21, 2018, a Nintendo Switch edition, called Peace, Death! Complete Edition, was published by HypeTrain Digital in Europe. It included all the content from the "Hand Of F". On December 14, 2018, the release arrived in the United States.

== Reception ==
Reception

Review scores
Publication	Score	
Publication	NS	PC
Overclockers.ru		7.8/10
Phenixx Gaming		8.5/10
Switch Player	3.5/5	

Peace, Death! was often compared to Papers, Please due to its similar gameplay loop.

4Gamer.net described the gameplay as simple, but addictive. They highlighted the humor as a useful tool that could allow the player to relax amid the stress, and noted how the bizarre character appearances could be distracting for the player. Oliver Roderick from Switch Player also appreciated the comedy. He drew attention to the abundance of characteristics, a feature that creates unexpected depth but might feel overwhelming. The review deemed the safe-cracking puzzles "a little out of place", while acknowledging they "at least offer something a little different". Overall, Roderick considered it a worthwhile budget game.

Shaun Musgrave, writing for TouchArcade, was pleased by the game's central idea and gameplay, while mentioning its low price. Even so, he implied disliking certain jokes, and predicted the references might become dated. An Igromania article, by Lena Pi, described the game as a rather entertaining time-killer, despite its provocative title. Meanwhile, Overclockers.ru's review by Ruslan Gubaidullin viewed the ranking system as largely cosmetic and hardly useful. He was frustrated by the minigames, while pointing out they were mostly optional and did not punish the player for losing. At the same time, Gubaidullin was delighted by the pop culture references and humor. His general conclusion was that the game succeeded as a casual experience, rather than something trying to be deep.

Phenixx Gaming's David Sanders was overall quite positive about the game. He emphasized how the idea of a Reaper passing judgment upon mortals while dealing with the Four Horsemen of the Apocalypse felt new and interesting. Sanders also enjoyed the references, such as Gabe Newell. His criticism focused on the gameplay difficulty, where high focus is essential. He was also disappointed by the game's short length, as well as its apparent lack of an "endless mode" at the time of his review.

Jupiter Hadley, from Pocket Gamer, called it a "brilliant game" with "beautiful pixelated graphics".

== Accolades ==
Year	Event	Category	Result	Reference
2016	DevGAMM Moscow	Excellence in Game Design	Nominated	
2016	VK Fest	Excellence in Game Design	Won	
2017	DevGAMM Moscow	Best Indie Game	Nominated	
2017	VK Fest	Choice of C-c-combo Breaker!	Won	

== Related games ==
Draw Chilly, a spin-off game that takes place in the same universe as Peace, Death!, was released by AZAMATIKA in November 2019. It follows Vladimir, a mechanic who has been tasked by a Grim Reaper to transport a city and its inhabitants out of Purgatory.

Peace, Death! 2 was released on Steam on October 7, 2021. It introduces an independent Reapers Union that does not serve under the Four Horsemen of the Apocalypse. Despite the similar premise, the gameplay is substantially different from the original game, with six simultaneous clients instead of just one.
