= Parish church of St. Gallus, Bregenz =

Roman Catholic church in the city of Bregenz in Vorarlberg, Austria

Coordinates: 47°29′54″N 9°44′53″E

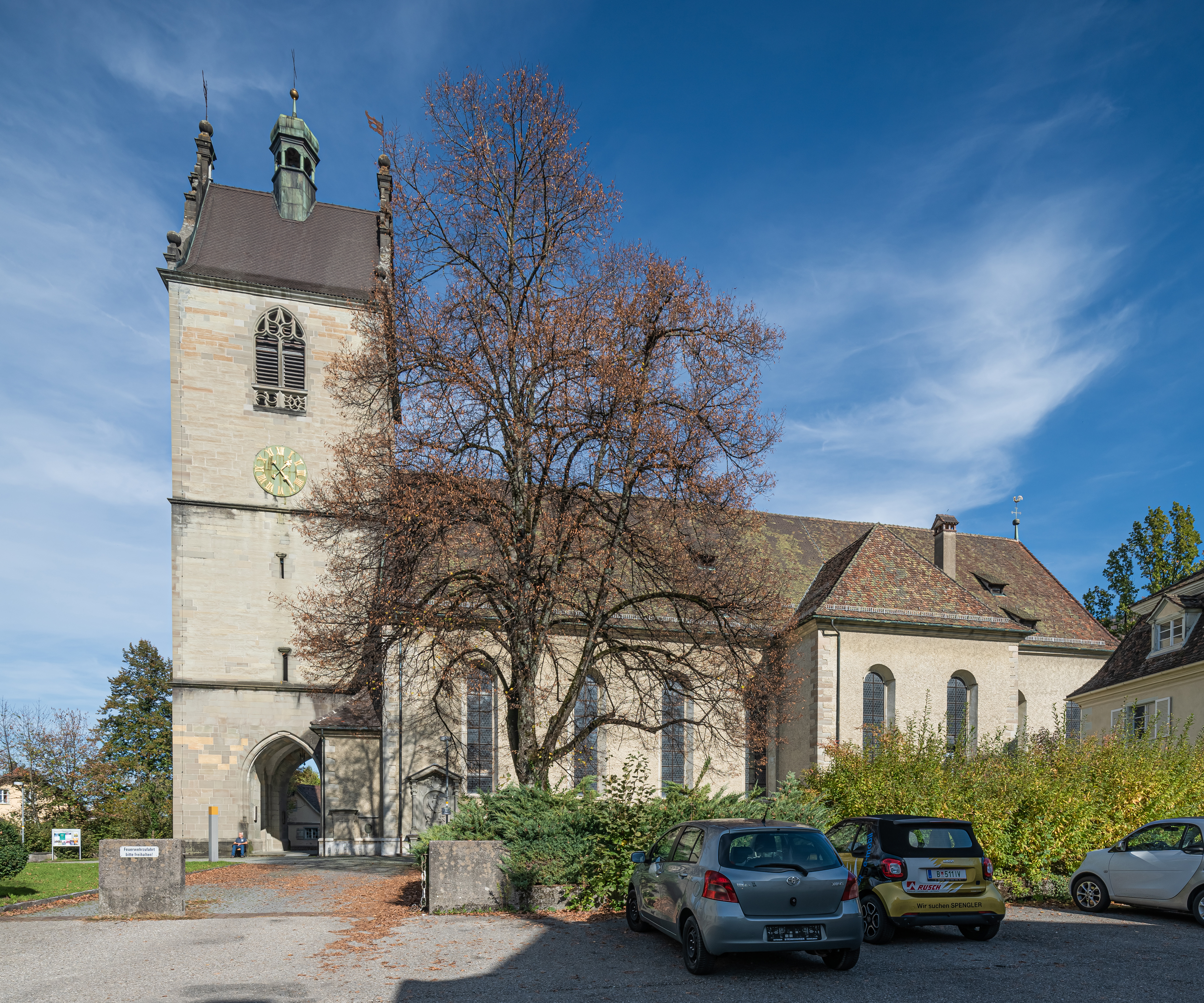
Exterior view of the church

The parish church of St. Gallus is a Roman Catholic church in the city of Bregenz in Vorarlberg, Austria.

The church is situated in the southeast of the city center in the district of Bregens village on a terrace, which slopes down to the creek valley.

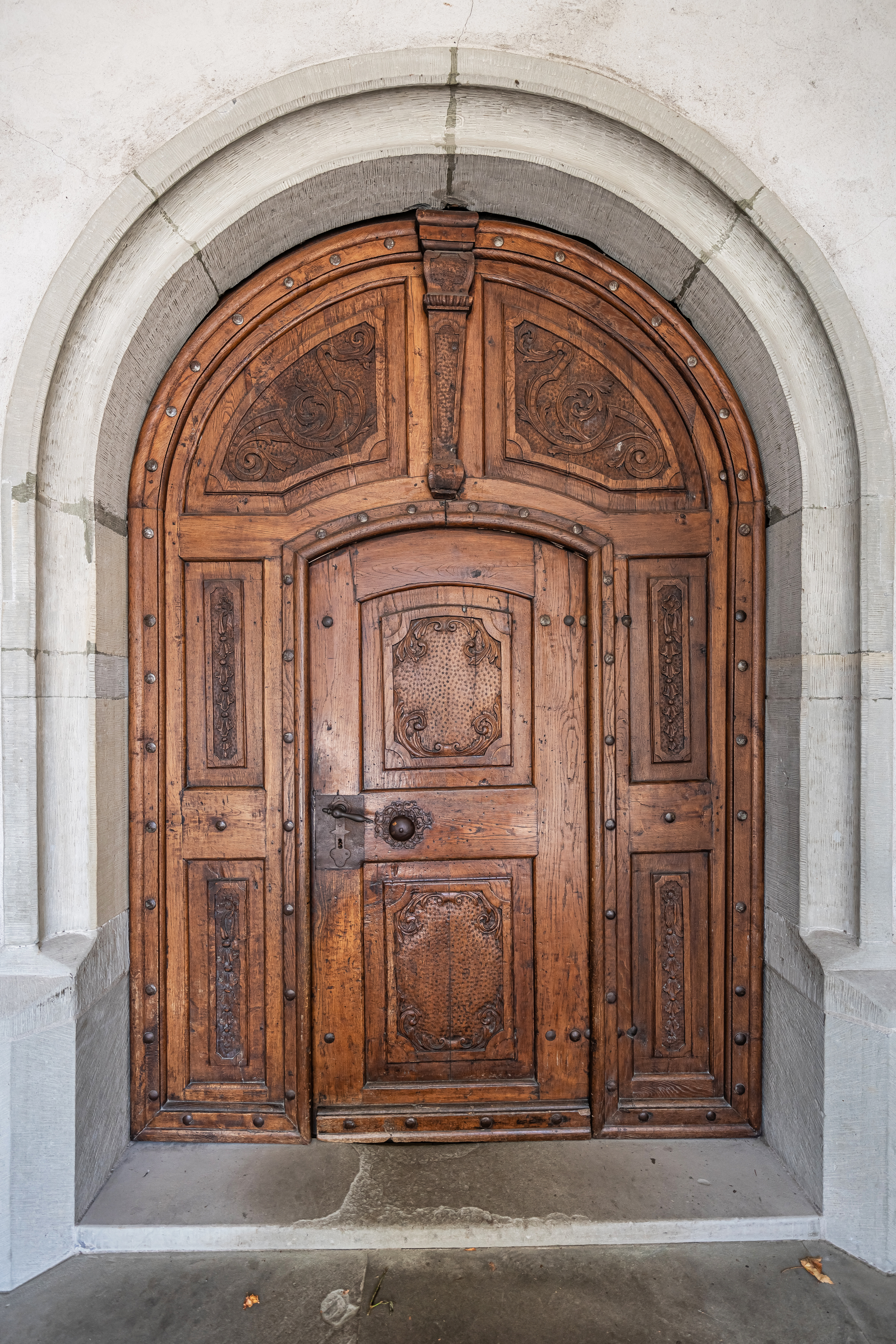
Church portal

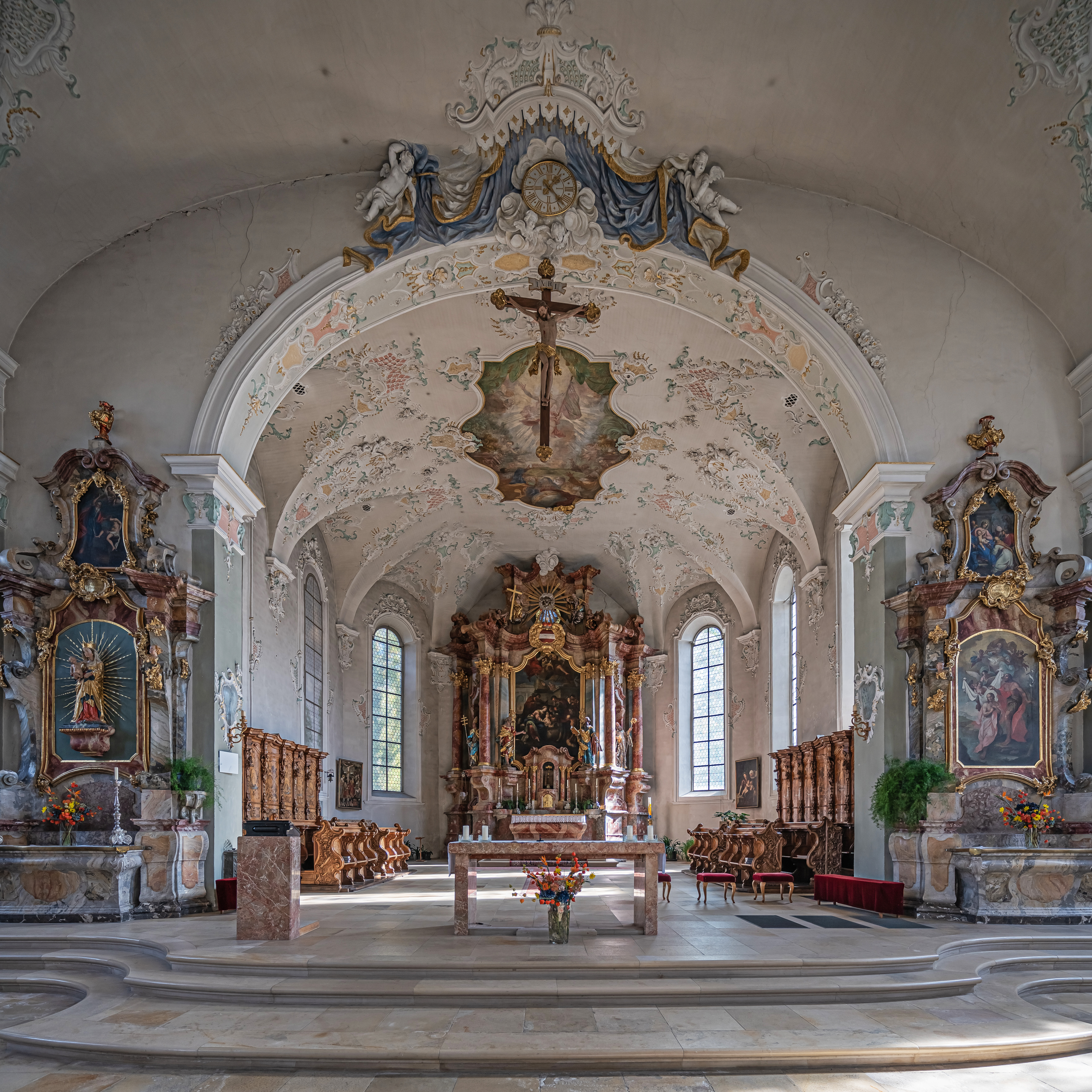
The altar

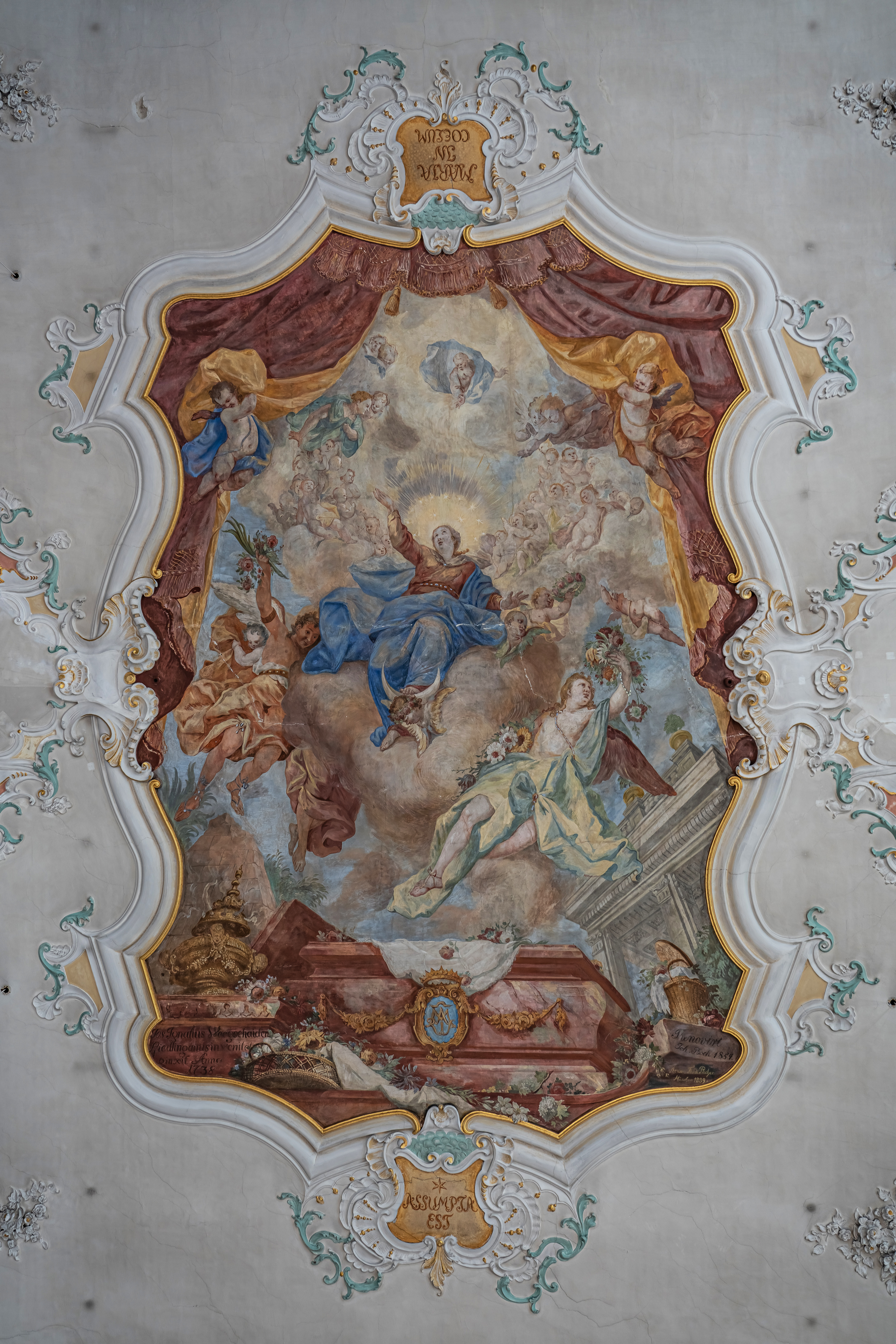
One of the ceiling frescos

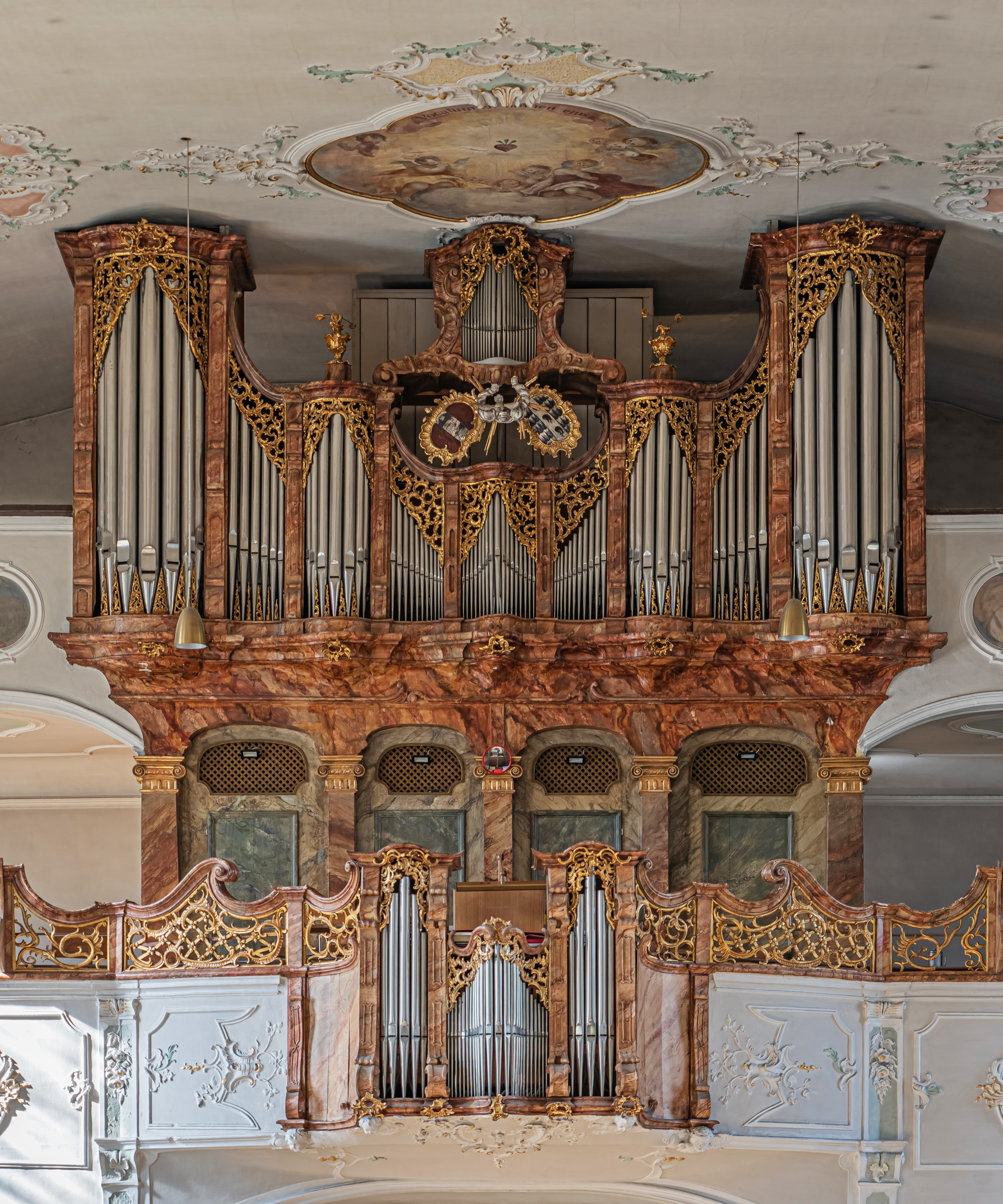
Pipe organ
