= Not Tonight: Migraine and the Politics of Gender and Health =

2014 book by Joanna Kempner

- Authors: Joanna Kempner
- Language: English
- Subjects: Sociology
- Publisher: University of Chicago Press
- Publication date: 2014
- Publication place: USA
- Media type: Print (hardcover, Paperback)
- Pages: 232
- Awards: Eliot Freidson Outstanding Publication Award (2016); Eileen Basker Memorial Prize (2016)
- ISBN: 978-0-22-617901-8

Not Tonight: Migraine and the Politics of Gender and Health is a 2014 book by the sociologist Joanna Kempner, published by University of Chicago Press. The book addresses the relationship between gendered social values and the treatment and understanding of migraine through a multisited ethnography. The book received the 2016 Eliot Freidson Outstanding Publication Award from the American Sociological Association's Section on Medical Sociology and the 2016 Eileen Basker Memorial Prize from the Society for Medical Anthropology.

== Reception ==
Reviewing the book for the journal Science, Technology and Society, Owen Whooley described the book as "a rich analysis of migraine medicine" and said that its "strengths come from the depth of its case analysis and its illumination of how migraine has been persistently constructed as a female malady". Whooley said that the book is "A strong contribution to our understanding of health, illness, gender and power", but described the absence of interviews with patients as "a curious omission".

Writing in Social Forces, Abigail C. Saguy described the book as a "wonderful sociological feat" and praised Kempner for striking "a perfect balance in incorporating her personal experiences with migraine within her account of her research findings". Saguy wrote that "Kempner shows how the strong collective understanding of migraine as a disorder that affects mainly women goes far in trivializing it".

Rachel Kahn Best, reviewing for the American Journal of Sociology, said that the book "reveals the moral and political dimensions of social responses to disease" and praised Kempner for addressing "a crucial question for medical and political sociology: whose pain do we take seriously, and whose do we mock?" Kahn Best said that Kempner "has not conclusively proven that these gendered assumptions cause migraine's "legitimacy defecit"" and suggested that some of Kempner's arguments in the book "could have been strengthend by additional comparative data".

Maria Siermann, in a review published in Medicine Anthropology Theory, described the book as "a compelling contribution to understanding the role notions of gender play in medicine". In a critical observation, Siermann said that "Unfortunately, Kempner sometimes remains vague and uncritical about what makes elements of migraine 'gendered'". Siermann summarised Not Tonight as "an important book" that "makes clear that medicalization is not an absolute structural power".

=== Awards ===
- ASA Section on Medical Sociology Eliot Freidson Outstanding Publication Award (2016).
- Society for Medical Anthropology Eileen Basker Memorial Prize (2016).
