= Not Tonight (video game) =

2018 video game

- Developer: PanicBarn
- Publisher: No More Robots
- Director: Tim Constant
- Engine: Unity
- Platforms: Microsoft Windows; Nintendo Switch
- Release: Microsoft Windows; 17 August 2018; Nintendo Switch; 31 January 2020
- Genres: Adventure, role-playing
- Mode: Single-player

Not Tonight is a role-playing adventure game by British studio PanicBarn, released for Microsoft Windows in August 2018, and for Nintendo Switch (as Not Tonight: Take Back Control Edition) on 31 January 2020, the actual date of the United Kingdom leaving the European Union. Set in an alternate timeline shortly after the United Kingdom's vote to leave the European Union, the player takes the role of a citizen of European heritage who must survive under an authoritarian British government, working as a bouncer across various venues and earning enough to avoid deportation. Along the way, the player must make decisions on whether to change the course of events or remain complicit with the new administration.

A downloadable content game called Not Tonight: One Love was released for Steam on 25 June 2019; the DLC later came bundled up for the Take Back Control Edition at the time of the game's release.

A sequel, Not Tonight 2, was announced in August 2021, and was released on 11 February 2022.

== Gameplay ==
The gameplay of Not Tonight is based on the responsibilities of a bouncer, working in Albion (England) as a person of European heritage who was newly stripped of his or her British citizenship and has become stateless. As a bouncer, the player must analyse various parts of the guests' identification cards, checking whether they are under age, have provided expired documents, have provided fraudulent information, are hiding contraband, or have an incorrectly matching photograph, and determine whether to allow entry to an establishment. As the game progresses, the player must undertake additional measures as requested by larger venues or by the state. This includes: stopping various nationalities from entering, those who wear certain clothing, individuals who are not on the guest list, people without tickets, and various other rules as gameplay becomes more challenging. Additionally, the player can also accept bribes or sell recreational drugs which will immediately gain money at the expense of losing social credit. Failing to pass a mission will also result in social credit loss, which can prevent the player from gaining more jobs, damage their progress and even end the game in deportation if the score drops to 0. After every mission, the player returns to their flat to interact with other characters, pay any outstanding rent, and to purchase any items that they may need. While playing the game, the player must make decisions which will affect the story through various characters that can be encountered.

== Plot ==
=== Setting ===
Not Tonight takes place primarily in England, which increasingly falls under the control of the nativist Albion First party and Prime Minister Simon Tavener. Taking advantage of social upheaval following a post-Brexit economic crisis, the British government has stripped citizenship from all Britons found to have ancestors from EU countries in the style of the Nuremberg Laws, relocating them to slum-like housing blocks in preparation for mass deportations.

The player is one of those residents, stripped of their identity and referred to only as "Person of European Heritage #112" or #112 for short.

=== Synopsis ===
On 31 December 2018, #112 is working as a bouncer taking tickets at a New Year's Eve ball at the British Museum when a terror bombing suddenly occurs.

The game then returns to 1 January 2018. Using their government-issued phone, #112 must take bouncer jobs in order to please his immigration officer Jupp and delay his seemingly-imminent deportation. As time progresses, #112 can make various decisions to either support the government or the resistance building up against Albion First. Jupp also conscripts the player into supporting his side hustle Jupp Security.

If #112 survives and avoids deportation by the end of the year, he is arrested following the bombing and sent to a televised court hearing. Due to a lack of evidence, the judge summons a group of witnesses to assess #112's character, the last of which is Jupp. If most of the witnesses describe #112 positively, the judge chooses to investigate his accusations against Albion First. The judge finds Jupp guilty of illegally importing furniture and accuses Simon Tavener of conspiracy and electoral fraud, bringing down the Albion First government.

== Reception ==
Reception

Aggregate score
Aggregator	Score	
Aggregator	NS	PC
Metacritic	78/100	71/100

Review scores
Publication	Score	
Publication	NS	PC
4Players	70%	N/A
GamesTM	N/A	7/10
Nintendo World Report	7.5/10	N/A
PC Gamer (UK)	N/A	71%

Not Tonight received "mixed or average reviews", while the Take Back Control Edition received "generally favourable reviews", according to the review aggregation website Metacritic.

Screen Rant gave an independent review of 4 out of 5 stars. Trusted Reviews summarised "Not Tonight proves that the Papers, Please formula can work in a less Soviet setting, but the experience is slightly diminished by the transplant. Yet its eccentricities remain endearing, with characters, landscapes and a haunting sound of muffled music that will be rambling around my skull for a little while yet."

Many reviewers have mentioned the likeness of the game to that of Papers, Please.

== Sequel ==
Not Tonight 2 was released on February 11, 2022 for Windows with a Nintendo Switch port released two years later on March 27, 2024. It has similar themes and gameplay to the original, but is set in a future, dystopian and collapsing United States that has been ravaged by a second secession of the South, the effects of climate change and a pandemic.
