= Hans Zürn the Elder =

German sculptor

Hans Zürn the Elder (born between 1555 and 1560, died after 1631) was a German sculptor and father of the famous Upper Swabian Zürn family of sculptors.

== Career ==
He received his training as a sculptor around 1560 in Bad Buchau. He may have been a student of Jakob Grangler. From 1582 he was a citizen and master sculptor in Bad Waldsee. Hans Zürn the Elder was a teacher of his six sons, including David, Hans the Younger, Martin, and Michael the Elder.
