= Bernhard Waldenfels =

German philosopher (1934–2026)

- Waldenfels c. 2004
- Born: 17 March 1934; Essen, Gau Essen, Germany
- Died: 23 January 2026 (aged 91); Munich, Bavaria, Germany
- Education: University of Bonn; University of Innsbruck; Ludwig-Maximilians-Universität München
- Occupations: Philosopher; Academic teacher
- Organizations: Ludwig-Maximilians-Universität München; Ruhr University Bochum

Bernhard Waldenfels (17 March 1934 – 23 January 2026) was a German philosopher and academic teacher. He is regarded as one of the leading phenomenologists of his era. He researched and taught at the Ruhr University Bochum from 1976 to 1999.

Based on the foundation of classical Greek philosophy, Waldenfels was influenced by Edmund Husserl's phenomenology and studied for two years in France, introducing then the ideas of French philosophers to German-speaking philosophers. Central themes of his writing are questions and answers, as well as phenomenological studies on experience, alterity, foreignness, and physicality (Leiblichkeit).

Waldenfels' core responsive phenomenology thesis manifests in that we are always already responding to the other, even when we think we are entirely ourselves or drawing from within ourselves.

== Life and career ==
Waldenfels was born in Essen on 17 March 1934, to Bernhard and Therese Waldenfels. He grew up with an elder brother, Hans. He studied philosophy, psychology, classical philology, and history at the University of Bonn, the University of Innsbruck, and the Ludwig-Maximilians-Universität München (LMU Munich). He was supported by the Studienstiftung and completed his studies in Munich in 1959 with a thesis on Socratic questioning. He took the Staatsexamen in Greek, Latin and history in 1960–1961. Waldenfels studied at the Sorbonne in Paris from 1960 to 1962, with Paul Ricoeur and Maurice Merleau-Ponty, who influenced him. He prepared for his habilitation on a scholarship of the Deutsche Forschungsgemeinschaft, completing in Munich in 1967 with his Edmund Husserl–centric dissertation Das Zwischenreich des Dialogs.

He taught Greek and Latin at a private school from 1966 to 1967, followed by working as assistant professor and lecturer at LMU Munich until 1976, when he was called as professor of philosophy to the Ruhr University Bochum. He researched and lectured there until his emeritation in 1999.

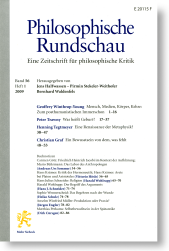
Cover of Philosophische Rundschau

Waldenfels was a publisher of the Philosophische Rundschau trade journal from 1975, and he co-founded the Deutsche Gesellschaft für phänomenologische Forschung. Among his books there are many translations into English, French, Italian, Japanese, Russian, Spanish, Serbo-Croatian and Turkish. He introduced French philosophers Maurice Merleau-Ponty and Emmanuel Levinas into German-speaking fields in 1983 in the book Phänomenologie in Frankreich that became a classic, as well as Antwortregister in 1994 and Bruchlinien der Erfahrung in 2002.

Waldenfels taught as a guest at Rotterdam in 1982, at the Fondation Maison des sciences de l'homme in Paris in 1984, at the New School in New York City in 1987, in Rome in 1989, in Louvain-la-Neuve in 1990, in San José, Costa Rica in 1991, in Debrecen in 1992, at the Central European University of Prague in 1993, at the State University of New York at Stony Brook in 1999, at the University of Vienna in 2002, and at the Chinese University of Hong Kong in 2004. In 2009 he gave his archive to the University of Freiburg as a symbol of the tradition of the university where Edmund Husserl, the founder of phenomenology, had taught.

=== Personal life ===
Waldenfels was married to Christin Waldenfels-Goes from 1961; they had two sons. His brother Hans Waldenfels was a fundamental theologian.

Waldenfels died in Munich on 23 January 2026, at the age of 91.

== Work ==
Waldenfels was influenced by Husserl, Martin Heidegger and Alfred Schütz, and French philosophy especially by Merleau-Ponty, Jean-Paul Sartre, Michel Foucault and Emmanuel Levinas. He focused on a phenomenology that is responsive and anchored in physical experience. He translated several key works by Merleau-Ponty into German and made contemporary French philosophy better known among German-speaking philosophers. Lambert Wiesing noted that Waldenfels pointed at Merleau's systematic significance for phenomenological Bildwissenschaft (image theory), which explores the relation between making visible in images and becoming visible in perception.

Central themes of his research are questions and answers, as well as phenomenological studies on experience, alterity, foreignness, and physicality. He observed the decline of order in modernity, and saw the concept of the foreign (Fremde) as addressed in the context of order, or orders, the foreign proving to be the extraordinary which cannot be spoken about, thought or experienced within an order, and therefore has no place in that order. Waldenfels wrote: "Dialogue is divided into discourses in Foucault's sense, each of which is subject to specific orders. The following statement therefore applies: as many orders as there are foreignnesses. The extraordinary accompanies order like a shadow."

Waldenfels wrote about theory of dialogue, the experienced "life world," structures of behavior, normativity, and order after a "shattering of the world" when the idea of a universal or fundamental order is lost. In his 2022 book Globality, Locality, Digitality. Challenges of Phenomenology., he noted: "Flirting with an endless 'not yet' obscures our view of everything non-technical, which does not negate the technical, but goes beyond technical know-how, beginning with what happens to us, surprises us, frightens us and hurts us, and which only unfolds its effect in our responses. In doing so, we encounter 'black holes of everyday life' for which there are no technical fillers."

=== Publications ===
The archive of works by Waldenfels is held by the University of Freiburg. Most of his works were published by Suhrkamp, first in Frankfurt, later in Berlin.

His works include:

- Das sokratische Fragen, Meisenheim: A. Hain 1961
- Das Zwischenreich des Dialogs. Sozialphilosophische Untersuchungen in Anschluß an E. Husserl, Den Haag: M. Nijhoff 1971 (Japanese. 1986)
- Der Spielraum des Verhaltens, Suhrkamp 1980 (in Japanese 1987)
- Phänomenologie in Frankreich, Suhrkamp 1983
- In den Netzen der Lebenswelt, Suhrkamp 1985, 1994 (in Serbo-Croatian 1991)
- Ordnung im Zwielicht, Suhrkamp 1987 (in English by David J. Parent: Order in the Twilight, 1996)
- Der Stachel des Fremden, Suhrkamp 1990, 1998 (in Slovene and Czech 1998)
- Einführung in die Phänomenologie, Fink 1992 (in Spanish 1997, Korean 1998, Ukrainian 2002)
- Antwortregister (Response Register), Suhrkamp 1994
- Deutsch-Französische Gedankengänge, Suhrkamp 1995
- Topographie des Fremden – Studien zur Phänomenologie des Fremden 1, Suhrkamp 1997 (in Polish 2002, Ukrainian 2004, French 2009)
- Grenzen der Normalisierung – Studien zur Phänomenologie des Fremden 2, Suhrkamp 1998 (in Hungarian 2006)
- Sinnesschwellen – Studien zur Phänomenologie des Fremden 3, Suhrkamp 1999
- Vielstimmigkeit der Rede – Studien zur Phänomenologie des Fremden 4, Suhrkamp 1999
- Das leibliche Selbst. Vorlesungen zur Phänomenologie des Leibes. edited by Regula Giuliani. Suhrkamp, 2000 (in Japanese 2004)
- Verfremdung der Moderne, Wallstein 2001
- Bruchlinien der Erfahrung, Suhrkamp 2002
- Spiegel, Spur und Blick. Zur Genese des Bildes, Salon Verlag 2003
- Findigkeit des Körpers, Norderstedt: Books on Demand 2004
- Phänomenologie der Aufmerksamkeit (Phenomenology of Attention), Suhrkamp 2004
- Idiome des Denkens. Deutsch-Französische Gedankengänge II, Suhrkamp (2005)
- The Question of the Other (2007), based on lectures by Waldenfels at the Chinese University of Hong Kong.
- Grundmotive einer Phänomenologie des Fremden, Suhrkamp 2006 (in Polish 2009, English 2011, Phenomenology of the Alien: Basic Concepts, translated by A. Kozin and T. Stähler)
- Schattenrisse der Moral, Suhrkamp 2006
- Philosophisches Tagebuch. Aus der Werkstatt des Denkens 1980–2005, Fink 2008.
- Ortsverschiebungen, Zeitverschiebungen: Modi leibhaftiger Erfahrung (Displacements of place and time: Modes of embodied experience), Suhrkamp 2009.
- Sinne und Künste im Wechselspiel: Modi ästhetischer Erfahrung, Suhrkamp 2010.
- Hyperphänomene: Modi hyperbolischer Erfahrung, Suhrkamp 2012.
- Sozialität und Alterität: Modi sozialer Erfahrung. Suhrkamp 2015.
- Platon: Zwischen Logos und Pathos. Suhrkamp 2017.
- Erfahrung, die zur Sprache drängt. Studien zur Psychoanalyse und Psychotherapie aus phänomenologischer Sicht. Suhrkamp 2019.
- Reisetagebuch eines Phänomenologen: Aus den Jahren 1978–2019. Ergon Verlag, Baden-Baden 2020.
- Globalität, Lokalität, Digitalität. Herausforderungen der Phänomenologie. Suhrkamp 2022.

== Awards ==
- 2012: honorific doctorate of the University of Rostock
- 2012: honorific doctorate of the University of Freiburg
- 2017: Sigmund-Freud-Kulturpreis
- 2021: Dr.-Leopold-Lucas-Preis of the University of Tübingen
