= Paul Needham (librarian) =

American academic librarian (born 1943)

- Born: 1943 (age 82–83)
- Education: Swarthmore College (BA); Harvard University (PhD)
- Occupations: Academic librarian; lecturer
- Employers: Princeton University (1998–2020); Sotheby's (1990–1998); Pierpont Morgan Library (1971–1990); Huntington Library (1970–1971)
- Awards: Bibliographical Society Gold Medal (2011); Guggenheim Fellowship (1984)

Paul Needham (born 1943) is an American academic librarian. From 1998 to 2020, he worked at the Scheide Library at Princeton University. A Guggenheim Fellow and Bibliographical Society Gold Medallist, Needham has delivered the Sandars Readership in Bibliography at the University of Cambridge, the A. S. W. Rosenbach Lectures in Bibliography at the University of Pennsylvania, and the Lyell Lectures at the University of Oxford. His focus is on incunabula, the earliest printed books in Europe.

In his role as an expert on incunabula, Needham has assisted investigations into forgeries, including tracking down a stolen letter by Christopher Columbus and assisting Nick Wilding in exposing the forged early edition of Galileo's Sidereus Nuncius. Needham is also noted for his outspoken stance against the preservation and maintenance of anthropodermic books, or books bound in human skin, and is one of the most prominent voices in the rare book world against their upkeep.

== Career ==
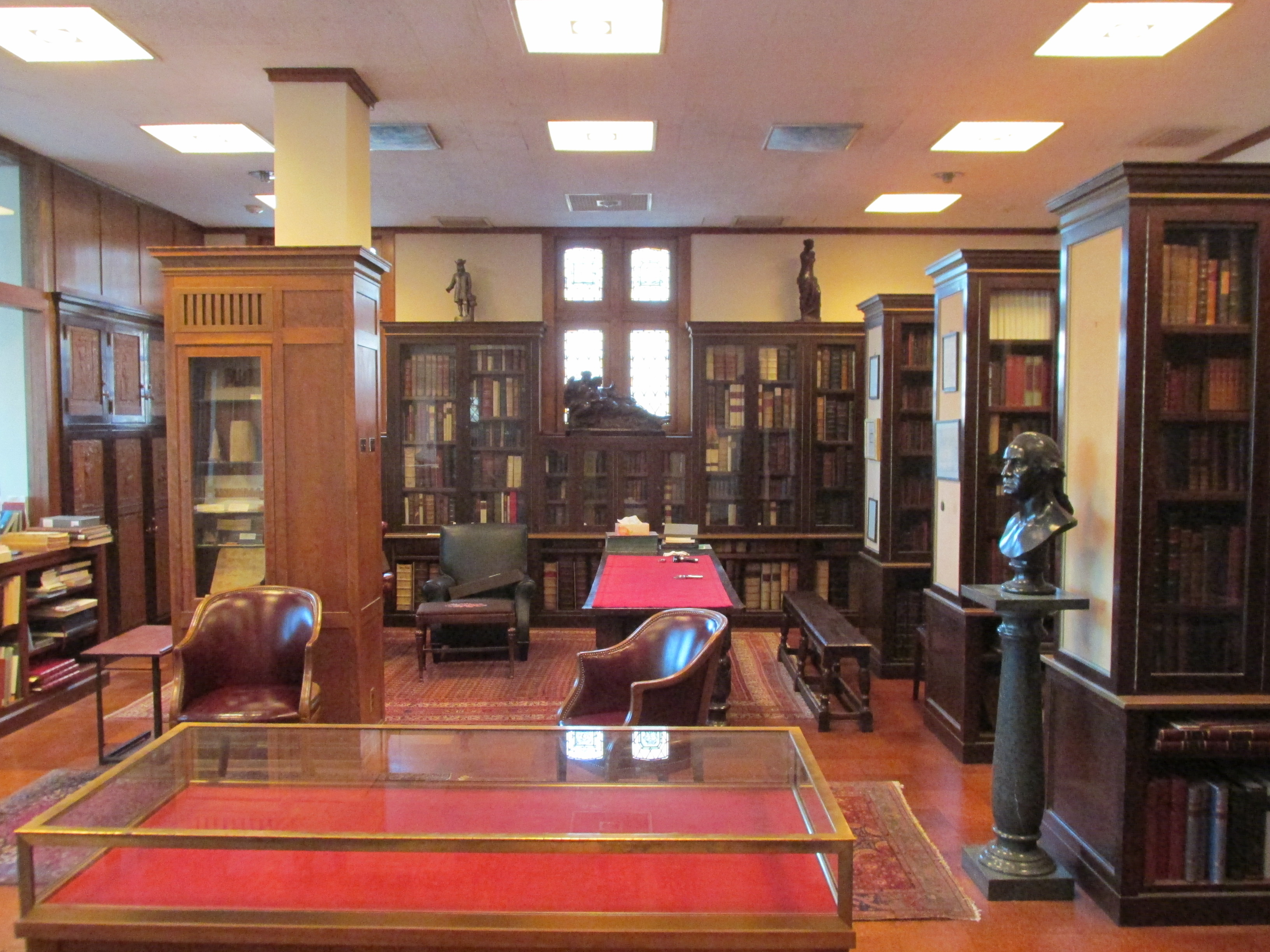
Scheide Library in 2013

After completing undergraduate and doctoral study at Swarthmore College and Harvard University, respectively, Needham worked at the Huntington Library in San Marino, California, from 1970 to 1971, the Pierpont Morgan Library in Manhattan from 1971 to 1990, and the New York branch of Sotheby's antique brokers from 1990 to 1998. He was awarded a Guggenheim Fellowship in 1984, during his time at the Pierpont Morgan Library, which he used to fund his research on the history of bookprinting in 15th-century England.

In March 1998, Needham became the Scheide Librarian at Princeton University Library, where he was the first person to be promoted to senior librarian. He was in this position in 2014, when William H. Scheide bequeathed the Scheide family's full collection of rare books to Princeton. The collection included a Gutenberg Bible, an original 1776 printing of the United States Declaration of Independence, and a collection of music manuscripts signed and annotated by Johann Sebastian Bach. Needham spoke to NPR about the experience of processing and preserving such a collection, including the role of library digitization for rare early publications.

Needham was a Sandars Reader at the University of Cambridge in 2004–2005, where he lectured on the role and work of printing shops in 15th-century bookprinting. He was awarded the Gold Medal of the Bibliographical Society, an award for "individuals who have made an outstanding contribution to the development" of bibliography, in 2011. In 2013, he delivered the A. S. W. Rosenbach Lectures in Bibliography at the University of Pennsylvania, titled "The First Quarter Century of European Printing".

Needham is a member of the Bibliographical Society of America, the American Printing History Association, and the Rare Book School. In the 1980s and 1990s, he taught several courses at the Morgan and Huntington libraries through the Rare Book School, on the subject of incunabula (early printed books). He retired from his post at the Scheide Library in 2020.

Post-retirement, he has remained active in bibliographic scholarship, holding the Lyell Readership in Bibliography at the University of Oxford in 2021 on the origins and texts of the Gutenberg Bible and returning to teaching at the Rare Book School.

== Research, works, and philosophy ==
Needham's scholarly focus is incunabula, or early printed books in Europe. In 1976, before he became employed himself by the Scheide Library, he noted how it was the only library outside Europe to catalogue all eighteen German Bible editions that predated Martin Luther's rise to prominence. In 1983, he took over the role of collecting the Census of Incunabula in American Libraries; its previous preparer, Frederick R. Goff, had died the previous year. Needham later published an exploration of the Incunabula Short Title Catalogue and its efforts to quantitatively catalogue surviving incunabula, considered the primary historical overview of the difficulties with estimating incunabulum survival.

Following the 2005 publication of Galilei der Künstler, a monograph by Horst Bredekamp based on the purported discovery of a watercolour illustrated edition of Galileo Galilei's Sidereus Nuncius, Needham assisted Nick Wilding in discovering the edition was a forgery. Needham was a contributor to Galileo's O, a 2011 essay compilation analysing the book; his original assessment was positive. Wilding contacted him with his suspicions that the publication was a modern fabrication, leading Needham to reanalyse it and discover that the depth of ink splotches on the page was incompatible with the book being made by a contemporary printing press. Shortly after, in mid-2012, the two of them announced the findings and Needham retracted his supportive assessment in Galileo's O.

During the late 2010s, Needham collaborated with the Department of Homeland Security and the United States District Court for the District of Delaware to track down a stolen copy of a letter written by Christopher Columbus. After a copy sold on the private collector market was found to be a potential forgery, Needham assisted in investigations to discover the whereabouts of the original. He identified a number of recent forgeries, as well as the original, which had been stolen from the Biblioteca Marciana in Venice in the mid-1980s; the letter was able to be returned to Italy. The U.S. Attorney's Office for the District of Delaware described it as the rarest of the known surviving copies of Columbus's letters.

Needham is an outspoken critic of the preservation of books bound in human skin. When the Houghton Library at Harvard University identified one of the books in its collection (Des destinées de l'ame) as anthropodermic in 2014, Needham attacked their coverage, which described the discovery as "[g]ood news for fans of anthropodermic bibliopegy, bibliomaniacs and cannibals alike", as "shocking in its crudity" and argued that it was ethically necessary to remove and bury or cremate the binding. Needham was described as "the most vociferous voice from within the rare book world" calling for the destruction of this book's binding. He characterized the binding of this book in human skin as "an act of post-mortem rape", pointing out that the skin was taken from a woman and claiming that the man who bound the book, Ludovic Bouland, was motivated by psychosexual desires. In an interview with Megan Rosenbloom, a medical librarian and expert on anthropodermic books, Needham criticised the term anthropodermic as euphemistic and expressed his disappointment in Harvard, his alma mater, for its reaction to the identification. He also argued that rebinding such books does not constitute the loss of archival value, due to the frequency with which many centuries-old books have been rebound over their lifetimes. Though Needham is generally described as supporting the destruction of anthropodermic bindings, he disputes this characterization, describing his position as instead agitating for "respectful burial of the human remains".

Selected works that Needham has been involved with include his publication of Twelve Centuries of Bookbindings, 400–1600 through Oxford University Press in 1979, writing the preface to Johann Gutenberg and His Bible: A Historical Study in 1988, his editing of A Galileo Forgery: Unmasking the New York Sidereus Nuncius alongside Bredekamp and Irene Brückle in 2014, and his delivery of the Sandars, Rosenbach, and Lyell Lectures in 2004, 2013, and 2021 respectively.

== See also ==
- List of Guggenheim Fellowships awarded in 1984
