= Gottfried Boehm =

German art historian and philosopher

Gottfried Boehm (pronounced [ˈɡɔtfʁiːt ˈbøːm]; born 1942) is a German art historian and philosopher.

== Life ==
Boehm studied art history, philosophy and German in Cologne, Vienna and Heidelberg. He obtained his Promotion (doctorate) in philosophy in 1968 and his Habilitation in 1974 in art history. From 1975 to 1979 he taught art history at the Ruhr-Universität Bochum. In 1979 he was made professor of art history at the Justus-Liebig-Universität Gießen. In 1986 Boehm moved to the University of Basel, where since 2005 he has also been director of the Swiss national research project "Eikones / NCCR Iconic Criticism".

In 1993-94 Gottfried Boehm was fellow of the Wiener Institut für die Wissenschaften vom Menschen (Institute for Advanced Studies) and in 2001-02 fellow at the Wissenschaftskolleg zu Berlin. Since 2006 he is a corresponding member of the Heidelberger Akademie der Wissenschaften.

== Work ==
In his work Gottfried Boehm is particularly influenced by hermeneutics and phenomenology and by the hermeneutic thought of Hans-Georg Gadamer. He has worked on the theory of art and perception in the Renaissance, the 19th and 20th centuries, on contemporary art and on general questions of modernity.

Recently he has been particularly prominent for his contributions to the history and theory of images, introducing the theory of the iconic turn for the first time in the anthology Was ist ein Bild? from 1994. Beyond this he has advanced the concept of iconic difference. According to this concept, images convey meaning exclusively through visual means, unlike texts, which rely on the predicative model of language propositions. In this way, he rejects the possibility of reading images as texts, an approach introduced by the linguistic turn in semiotics and philosophy of language, advocating instead for images to "show" rather than "say."

Gottfried Boehm is regarded, along with Hans Belting and Horst Bredekamp, as one of the leading theoreticians of art in the German-speaking world.

Boehm is a prominent figure in the field of Bildwissenschaft ("image-science"). His account of Bildwissenschaft draws on aesthetics and the work of Maurice Merleau-Ponty, Hans-Georg Gadamer, Hans Jonas, Arthur Danto, Meyer Schapiro, Kurt Bauch and Max Imdahl. Boehm addresses questions around the phenomenology of viewing and pictorial representation and the question of medium. He also seeks to understand the cognitive processes involved in the presentation and perception of images, and their differences from linguistic processes.

== Publications ==
Monographs:

- Wie Bilder Sinn erzeugen - Die Macht des Zeigens, Berlin 2007.
- Der Maler Max Weiler: Das Geistige in der Natur, Vienna, New York 2001.
- Museum der klassischen Moderne: Zwanzig Meisterwerke der modernen Kunst, Frankfurt 1997.
- Paul Cézanne: Montagne Sainte-Victoire, Frankfurt 1988.
- Bildnis und Individuum. Über den Ursprung der Porträtmalerei in der italienischen Renaissance, Munich 1985.
- Studien zur Perspektivität. Philosophie und Kunst in der frühen Neuzeit, Heidelberger Forschungen Nr. 13, Diss. Heidelberg 1969.

As editor:

- Ikonologie der Gegenwart, Munich 2008. (with Horst Bredekamp)
- Movens Bild. Zwischen Evidenz und Affekt, Munich 2008.
- Figur und Figuration: Studien zu Wahrnehmung und Wissen, Munich 2007.
- Henri Matisse: Figur, Farbe, Raum, Ostfildern 2005
- Homo pictor, Munich 2001.
- Konstruktionen, Sichtbarkeiten: Interventionen, Wien 1999.
- Cézanne und die Moderne, Ostfildern 1999.
- Gesammelte Schriften von Max Imdahl, Frankfurt 1996.
- Beschreibungskunst - Kunstbeschreibung: Ekphrasis von der Antike bis zur Gegenwart, Munich 1995.
- Was ist ein Bild? Munich 1995.
- Individuum: Probleme der Individualität in Kunst, Philosophie und Wissenschaft, Stuttgart 1994.
- Modernität und Tradition: Festschrift für Max Imdahl zum 60. Geburtstag, Munich 1985.
- Seminar: Die Hermeneutik und die Wissenschaften, Frankfurt 1985.
- Schriften zur Kunst von Konrad Fiedler, 2 vols., Munich 1971.

Essays (selection):

- "Representation, Presentation, Presence: Tracing the Homo Pictor", in: Iconic Power. Materiality and Meaning in Social Life, ed. Jeffrey C. Alexander, Dominik Bartmanski, and Bernhard Giesen, New York 2012; pp. 15–23.
- "Ce qui se montre. De la différence iconique", in Penser l'image, ed. Emmanuel Alloa, Paris, Les Presses du réel, 2010, pp. 27–47.
- "Das Bild und die hermeneutische Reflexion", in: Dimensionen des Hermeneutischen. Heidegger und Gadamer, ed. Martin-Heidegger-Gesellschaft. Schriftenreihe, Band 7, Frankfurt am Main, 2005, pp. 23–35.
- "Jenseits der Sprache? Anmerkungen zur Logik der Bilder", in: Iconic Turn. Die Neue Macht der Bilder, ed. Christa Maar and Hubert Burda, Cologne 2004, pp. 28–43.
- "Der stumme Logos. Elemente einer Bildwissenschaft", in: Jahrbuch des Wissenschaftskollegs zu Berlin, Institute for Advanced Study, Berlin 2001/2002, pp. 188–208.
- "Die Kraft der Bilder. Die Kunst von 'Geisteskranken' und der Bilddiskurs", in: Wahn, Welt, Bild, Die Sammlung Prinzhorn. Beiträge zur Museumseröffnung (Heidelberger Jahrbücher XLVI), Heidelberg 2002, pp. 1–10.
- "Paul Cézanne und die Moderne", in: Cézanne und die Moderne, catalogue (Fondation Beyeler, Riehen/ Basel), Ostfildern-Ruit 1999, pp. 10–27.
- "Bildbeschreibung. Über die Grenzen von Bild und Sprache", in: G. Boehm und H. Pfotenhauer (eds.), Beschreibungskunst - Kunstbeschreibung. Die Ekphrasis von der Antike bis zur Gegenwart, Munich 1995, pp. 23–40.
- "Die Wiederkehr der Bilder", in: Was ist ein Bild?, ed. Gottfried Boehm, Munich 1994, pp. 11–38.
- "Die Bilderfrage", in: Was ist ein Bild?, ed. Gottfried Boehm, Munich 1994, pp. 325–343.
- "Mnemosyne. Zur Kategorie des erinnernden Sehens", in: G. Boehm, K.H. Stierle and G. Winter (eds.), Modernität und Tradition, Festschrift Max Imdahl, Munich 1985, pp. 37–57.
- "Zu einer Hermeneutik des Bildes", in: H.-G. Gadamer and G. Boehm (eds.), Seminar: Die Hermeneutik und die Wissenschaften, Frankfurt 1978, pp. 444–471.
