= Arthur Engelbert =

- Born: 1951; Werdohl, West Germany
- Died: 22 May 2026 (aged 74–75); Berlin, Germany
- Occupations: Professor in media theory and art sciences

Arthur Engelbert (1951 – 22 May 2026) was a professor in media theory and art sciences at the University of Applied Sciences Potsdam.

== Life ==
Before pursuing his university studies, Arthur Engelbert worked for seven years as an industrial electronics technician at a steelworks in Dortmund. In 1985, he earned his doctorate with a study on the concept of the "line" in the work of Gottfried Boehm and Max Imdahl; subsequently, he worked on the repurposing of the Völklingen Ironworks for the State Heritage Conservation Office in Saarbrücken and served as a research associate at the Berlin University of the Arts from 1987 to 1992.

In 1996, Engelbert was appointed professor at the University of Applied Sciences Potsdam, and in 1998, he completed his habilitation in "Media Theory and Art Studies" under Bazon Brock in Wuppertal. Between 1992 and 1998, he held teaching positions focused on the communication of contemporary art at various universities and art colleges.

In addition to his teaching activities, Arthur Engelbert managed a multimedia company (MIB, until 2001) in Berlin for ten years, served for many years on the board of the Werkbund Archive in Berlin, and—starting in 1999—established the research project cultrans, which investigates transfers between cultures and the arts. From 2010, he was a member of the German Research Foundation (DFG) Research Training Group at the University of Potsdam. In 2012, he co-founded the "Institute for Applied Reality Change". Beginning in 2013, he developed the transcultural project "Pedestrian Republic". In retirement, Arthur Engelbert remained affiliated with the University of Applied Sciences Potsdam as a research member. This was followed in 2017–18 by a teaching assignment at the Indian Institute of Technology Bombay (IIT/IDC / Industrial Design Centre), funded by the German Academic Exchange Service and IIT Bombay.

== Selected works ==
- Coincidentia. Zehn Versuche zur zeitgenössischen Kunst, München: Edition Metzel 2018
- Idiorrhythmie: Vorschläge für ein anderes Lernen, Baden-Baden: Nomos Verlag 2017
- Realität und Fiktion. realtà e finzione. Die Welt des Nino Indaimo. Il mondo di Nino Indaimo, Marburg: Tectum Verlag 2017
- Politik und Bild. Eine Langzeitstudie zu Wahrnehmungsumbrüchen innerhalb der letzten dreieinhalb Jahrzehnte, Marburg: Tectum Verlag 2016
- Notes on Urban Kibbutz, Mutual Aid and Social Erotism. Social Imagination for a Collective Society, Marburg: Tectum Verlag 2016
- Die Treppe. Eine kulturgeschichtliche und medienkritische Studie, anhand ausgewählter Beispiele aus verschiedenen Medien, mit einem Glossar, Würzburg: Königshausen & Neumann 2014
- Help! Gegenseitig behindern oder helfen. Eine politische Skizze zur Wahrnehmung heute. Würzburg: Königshausen & Neumann 2012
- Global Images. Eine Studie zur Praxis der Bilder. Mit einem Glossar zu Bildbegriffen. transcript Verlag, Bielefeld Januar 2011
- Der Hörraum. Akustische Experimente und Perspektiven des Klangraums in den letzten fünfzig Jahren. Südwestdeutscher Verlag für Hochschulschriften 2009
- Gegenseitige Hilfe, Marburg: Tectum Verlag 2010
- Normalkultur. Kulturen im Dialog. Würzburg: Königshausen & Neumann 2008
- cultrans. Ansichts-Sachen der Kunst – Views of Art. Königshausen & Neumann 2005, Engelbert, Arthur (Hg.) / Pagel, Maike (Hg.) / Borchers, Wolf (Hg.)
- Das Glashaus von Bruno Taut – Bauen im Licht. Built In The Light, eine CD-ROM der mib GmbH, Vertrieb durch den Verlag der Buchhandlung Walther König, Berlin 1996, Engelbert, Arthur (Hg.) / Ramershoven, Markus (Hg.) / Thiekötter, Angelika Hg.
- Conrad von Soest. Ein Dortmunder Maler um 1400, Köln: Verlag der Buchhandlung Walther König, 1995, sold out.
