= Hans Waldenfels =

German Jesuit priest and theologian (1931–2023)

Hans Waldenfels SJ
- Hans Waldenfels, in c. 1990
- Born: 20 October 1931; Essen, Rhine Province, Prussia, Germany
- Died: 12 November 2023 (aged 92); Essen, North Rhine-Westphalia, Germany
- Education: Sophia University; Pontifical Gregorian University
- Occupations: Priest; Theologian

Hans Waldenfels (20 October 1931 – 12 November 2023) was a German Jesuit priest, biblist, and theologian. He was a professor of fundamental theology at the University of Bonn.

== Biography ==
Born in Essen on 20 October 1931, Waldenfels was the older brother of philosopher Bernhard Waldenfels. On 5 April 1951, he joined the Society of Jesus and completed his novitiate and philosophy studies in Pullach. From 1960 to 1964, he studied philosophy at Sophia University in Tokyo and was ordained on 18 March 1964 by Archbishop of Tokyo Peter Doi. From 1965 to 1968, he studied for his doctorate at the Pontifical Gregorian University in Rome and the University of Münster. His thesis, titled Révélation - Le Concile Vatican II sur fond de la théologie nouvelle, was published in 1969 under the direction of Karl Rahner. In 1976, he became a professor at the University of Würzburg.

In 1977, Waldenfels became a professor of fundamental theology, religious theology, and theological philosophy at the University of Bonn. He was dean of the faculty of theology there from 1979 to 1980 and from 1988 to 1990. He became a professor emeritus in 1997. He was a vicar in Düsseldorf from 1991 to 2006. From 2006 to 2007, he was a guest professor at Marquette University in the United States.

Waldenfels earned an honorary doctorate from the Cardinal Stefan Wyszyński University in Warsaw in 1993. He wrote numerous works on theology and Biblical criticism. He also sought interreligious dialogue with Judaism, Hinduism, Buddhism, and Islam.

Hans Waldenfels died in Essen on 12 November 2023, at the age of 92.

== Publications ==
- Offenbarung. Das 2. Vatikanische Konzil auf dem Hintergrund der neueren Theologie (1969)
- Absolutes Nichts. Zur Grundlegung des Dialogs zwischen Buddhismus und Christentum (1976)
- Kontextuelle Fundamentaltheologie (1984)
- Phänomen Christentum. Eine Weltreligion in der Welt der Religionen (1994)
