= Wissenschaft =

German-language term; any study that involves systematic research

Wissenschaft (lit. "knowledgeship") is a German-language term that embraces scholarship, research, study, higher education, and academia. Wissenschaft translates exactly into many other languages, e.g. vetenskap in Swedish or nauka in Polish, but there is no exact translation in modern English. The common translation to "science" can be misleading, depending on the context, because Wissenschaft equally includes humanities (Geisteswissenschaft), and sciences and humanities are mutually exclusive categories in modern English. Wissenschaft includes humanities like history, anthropology, or arts (study of literature, visual arts, or music) at the same level as sciences like chemistry or psychology. Wissenschaft incorporates scientific and non-scientific inquiry, learning, knowledge, scholarship, and does not necessarily imply empirical research.

== History ==
Before Immanuel Kant published his Critique of Judgment in 1790, "schöne Wissenschaft" was highly regarded. "Schöne Wissenschaft" included poetry, rhetoric, and other subjects that were meant to promote an understanding of truth, beauty, and goodness. Kant argued that aesthetic judgments were not an area of systematic knowledge, and therefore were outside the realm of Wissenschaft.

== Compared to the term "science" ==
Although Wissenschaft and science were roughly comparable words in previous centuries, the word science in English "has narrowed its meaning incomparably, whereas Wissenschaft...has retained its broad meaning". In modern English, the word science refers to systematically acquired, objective knowledge that is about a particular subject (the workings of the natural world, including the people in it) and produced through a particular methodology (the scientific method), in a progressive, iterative process that builds on previous knowledge. Wissenschaft, by contrast, encompasses both humanities and sciences, and both knowledge of objects as well as truths, such as what it means to be good.

The difficulties of being precise about knowledge are one reason why English is not considered well-suited for discussions about epistemology, and terms from other languages, notably Latin and German, are commonly used.

Some 19th-century Americans visiting German universities interpreted Wissenschaft as meaning "pure science," untainted by social purposes and opposed to the liberal arts.

Some contemporary scientists and philosophers interpret Wissenschaft as meaning any true knowledge or successful method, including philosophical, mathematical, and logical knowledge and methods.

== See also ==
- Ilm (Arabic)

Phrases employing this term include the following:

- Wissenschaft des Judentums, the "scholarship of Judaism," a 19th-century scholarly movement
- Die fröhliche Wissenschaft, the title of a book written by Friedrich Nietzsche and first published in 1882
- Bildwissenschaft, an academic discipline in the German-speaking world associated with visual studies and art history
