= Horst Bredekamp =

German art historian

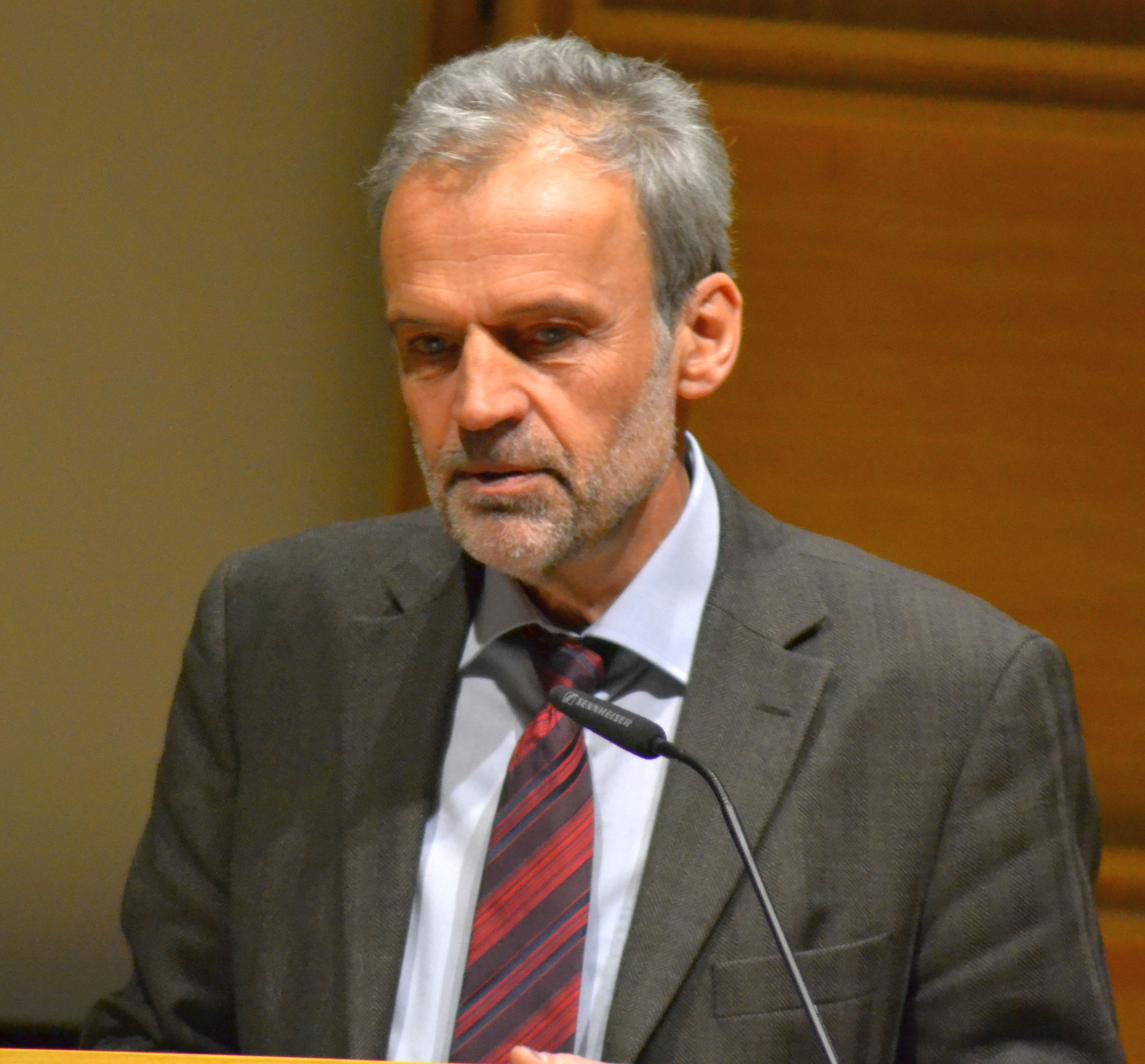
Horst Bredekamp at a conference in March 2015 in Düsseldorf

Horst Bredekamp (born 29 April 1947, in Kiel) is a German art historian and visual historian.

== Life and work ==
Bredekamp studied art history, archaeology, philosophy and sociology in Kiel, Munich, Berlin and Marburg. In 1974 he received his doctorate at the Philipps-Universität Marburg with a thesis on art as a medium of social conflicts, especially the "Bilderkämpfe" of late antiquity to the Hussite revolution. He worked first as a volunteer at the Liebieghaus in Frankfurt am Main, from 1976 as assistant in the division of Art History at the University of Hamburg.

In 1982 he was appointed professor of art history at the University of Hamburg, in 1993 he moved to the Humboldt University Berlin. Since 2003 he has been a Permanent Fellow of the Institute for Advanced Study, Berlin, in 2005 the Gadamer-endowed chair. Bredekamp was a fellow at the Institute for Advanced Study, Princeton (1991), Institute for Advanced Study in Berlin (1992), Getty Center, Los Angeles (1995 and 1998) and the Collegium Budapest (1999).

The research foci of Horst Bredekamp are iconoclasm, Romanesque sculpture, art of the Renaissance and mannerism, political iconography, art and technology, new media. In the course of his move to Berlin, Bredekamp supported the incorporation of the Census research project into the Humboldt University. In 2000 he founded the project "The Technical Image" at the Hermann von Helmholtz-Centre for Cultural Techniques (HZK) of the Humboldt University Berlin, which developed under his leadership visually critical methods, a theory of pictorial knowledge in the fields of science and technology and medical visualizations. From 2008 to 2018 Bredekamp was co-founder and director of the DFG-Kolleg research group "Image Act and embodiment" ("Bildakt und Verkörperung") at Humboldt University Berlin.

In 2007, Bredekamp's monograph Galilei der Künstler [Galileo the artists] appeared in German newspapers. This monograph was based on the discovery of an edition of Galileo's Sidereus Nuncius including unknown Galileo-attributed ink drawings. After a thorough inspection including material technical studies, Bredekamp and his co-authors declared this newly discovered work to be the genuine work of Galileo. In 2012, historian Nick Wilding discovered that this copy was, in fact, a forgery which had been brought by the Italian antiquarian and convicted criminal Marino Massimo De Caro in the U.S. antique trade.

From 2012 to 2018, together with Wolfgang Schäffner, Bredekamp served as speaker of the Cluster of Excellence “Image Knowledge Gestaltung” at the Humboldt University in the second phase of the German Universities Excellence Initiative. The research project operated as an interdisciplinary laboratory that brought together Humanities, Natural and Technical Sciences, as well as Medical and – for the first time in basic research – Design and Architecture.

Subsequently, since 2019, both Bredekamp and Schäffner are Directors of the Cluster of Excellence “Matters of Activity. Image Space Material”. The cluster investigates the culture of materials in the digital age and is composed of researchers from more than 40 disciplines.

From the spring of 2015 until 2018 he served, next to the British museum director Neil MacGregor (director) and the archaeologist Hermann Parzinger, as one of the three founding director of the future Humboldt Forum in the walls of the reconstructed Berliner Stadtschloss. He emphasizes a collection history that is based on the Cabinet of Curiosities as a world museum, where collections of initially foreign objects act as means for critical self-reflection and offers for understanding ‘the other’. This connection to a decidedly anticolonial tradition of collecting was argued most recently in Bredekamp's book “Aby Warburg der Indianer” (2019, German).

== Bildwissenschaft ==
Bredekamp is known for his work in the field of Bildwissenschaft ("image science", see also Visual Culture), a subdiscipline of art history founded by Aby Warburg. which considers the cognitive functions performed by the image, the question of a stylistic history of scientific imagery, and the role played by visual argumentation during the Scientific Revolution. His interests lay in the implementation of image-critical methods and theories of visual cognition from the fields of scientific, technical and medical imaging. Both the scientific journal Bildwelten des Wissens (since 2003) and the compendium The Technical Image (2015) result from this research. Focusing primarily on images that fall outside of a narrowly defined idea of art, such as those used in the works of the philosophers Thomas Hobbes and Gottfried Wilhelm Leibniz and the scientists Charles Darwin and Galileo Galilei, Bredekamp argues that images inculcate a particular kind of understanding that could not be formed without them. Bredekamp criticises the idea, associated with Klaus Sachs-Hombach, that Bildwissenschaft might be constructed by amassing the pre-existing insights of various disciplines, arguing that a new science cannot be straightforwardly established through the adding together of existing disciplines. Against Sachs-Hombach's argument that art history is one of many disciplines on which Bildwissenschaft should draw, and Hans Belting's argument that art history is outdated or obsolescent, Bredekamp argues that (Austro-German) art history has always contained an incipiently universal orientation and a focus on non-art images.

== Personal life ==
In April 2023, Bredekamp was one of the 22 personal guests at the ceremony in which former Chancellor Angela Merkel was decorated with the Grand Cross of the Order of Merit for special achievement by President Frank-Walter Steinmeier at Schloss Bellevue in Berlin.

== Publications ==
Monographs:

- Kunst als Medium sozialer Konflikte. Bilderkämpfe von der Spätantike bis zur Hussitenrevolution, Frankfurt am Main (Suhrkamp) 1975.
- Kunst am Mittelrhein um 1400 (mit Herbert Beck und Wolfgang Beeh), Frankfurt am Main (Liebieghaus) 1975.
- Vicino Orsini und der heilige Wald von Bomarzo. Ein Fürst als Künstler und Anarchist, Worms (Werner) 1985; 2., überarb. Aufl. 1991.
- Botticelli: Primavera. Florenz als Garten der Venus, Frankfurt am Main (Fischer) 1988; New edition Berlin (Wagenbach) 2002.
- Antikensehnsucht und Maschinenglauben. Die Geschichte der Kunstkammer und die Zukunft der Kunstgeschichte, Berlin (Berlin) 1992.
- Florentiner Fußball. Die Renaissance der Spiele. Calcio als Fest der Medici, Frankfurt am Main (Campus) 1993; revised edition Berlin (Wagenbach) 2001.
- Repräsentation und Bildmagie der Renaissance als Formproblem, München (Carl Friedrich von Siemens-Stiftung) 1995.
- Sankt Peter in Rom und das Prinzip der produktiven Zerstörung. Bau und Abbau von Bramante bis Bernini, Berlin (Wagenbach) 2000.
- Thomas Hobbes visuelle Strategien. Der Leviathan: Urbild des modernen Staates. Werkillustrationen und Portraits, Berlin (Akademie) 1999. New edition under the title Thomas Hobbes: Der Leviathan. Das Urbild des modernen Staates und seine Gegenbilder. 1651–2001, Berlin (Akademie) 2003.
- Die Fenster der Monade. Gottfried Wilhelm Leibniz' Theater der Natur und Kunst, Berlin (Akademie) 2004.
- Darwins Korallen. Die frühen Evolutionsdiagramme und die Tradition der Naturgeschichte, Berlin (Wagenbach) 2005.
- Bilder bewegen. Von der Kunstkammer zum Endspiel, Berlin (Wagenbach) 2007.
- Galilei der Künstler. Der Mond, die Sonne, die Hand, Berlin (Akademie) 2007.
- Der Künstler als Verbrecher. Ein Element der frühmodernen Rechts- und Staatstheorie, München (Carl Friedrich von Siemens-Stiftung) 2008.
- Michelangelo. Fünf Essays, Berlin (Wagenbach) 2009.
- Theorie des Bildakts. Frankfurter Adorno-Vorlesungen 2007, Berlin (Suhrkamp) 2010.
- Leibniz und die Revolution der Gartenkunst. Herrenhausen, Versailles und die Philosophie der Blätter, Berlin (Wagenbach) 2012. ISBN 978-3-8031-5183-4.[28][29][30]
- Der schwimmende Souverän. Karl der Große und die Bildpolitik des Körpers, Klaus Wagenbach, Berlin 2014, ISBN 978-3-8031-5186-5.[31]
- Galileis denkende Hand. Form und Forschung um 1600, Berlin, Boston (de Gruyter) 2015. ISBN 978-3-11-041457-8.
- mit Claudia Wedepohl: Warburg, Cassirer und Einstein im Gespräch. Kepler als Schlüssel der Moderne, Berlin (Wagenbach) 2015. ISBN 978-3-8031-5188-9.
- Das Beispiel Palmyra, Köln 2016.
- Der Behemoth. Metamorphosen des Anti-Leviathan (Carl-Schmitt-Vorlesungen), Berlin 2016.
- Image Acts. A Systematic Approach to Visual Agency, Berlin, Boston (de Gryuter) 2017, ISBN 978-3-11-053630-0.
- Art History and Prehistoric Art. Rethinking their Relationship in the Light of New Observations, Groningen (The Gerson Lectures Foundation) 2019, ISBN 90-6179-054-9.
- Michelangelo, Berlin 2021, ISBN 9783803137074.
- Die Wirklichkeit findet statt! Über notwendige Präsenz in Kunst und Sport, (mit Gunter Gebauer), Köln 2021, ISBN 9783753300788.

Much of Bredekamp's work has been translated into other languages, including English, French, Spanish, Italian, Chinese, Japanese, Portuguese, Romanian, Estonian and Hungarian.

As editor(selection):

- (as coeditor): Aby Warburg. Akten des internationalen Symposions, Berlin (Akademie) 1990.
- (as coeditor): Edgar Wind. Kunsthistoriker und Philosoph, Berlin (Akademie) 1998.
- (as coeditor): Theater der Natur und Kunst. Wunderkammern des Wissens, 2 Bände, Berlin (Henschel) 2000.
- (as guesteditor): Jahrbuch für Universitätsgeschichte Bd. 5 (2002): Themenband „Universität und Kunst“, Stuttgart (Steiner) 2002.
- (as coeditor) Visuelle Argumentationen. Die Mysterien der Repräsentation und die Berechenbarkeit der Welt, München (Fink) 2006.
- (as coeditor) Klassizismus/Gotik. Karl Friedrich Schinkel und die patriotische Baukunst. München/Berlin (Dt. Kunstverlag) 2007.
- (as coeditor): Das Technische Bild. Kompendium zu einer Stilgeschichte wissenschaftlicher Bilder, Berlin (Akademie) 2008.
- (as coeditor): In der Mitte Berlins. 200 Jahre Kunstgeschichte an der Humboldt-Universität, Berlin (Gebr. Mann) 2010.
- (as editor of the series): Bildwelten des Wissens. Kunsthistorisches Jahrbuch für Bildkritik, Berlin (Akademie), halbjährlich seit 2003. Bd. 1.1: Bilder in Prozessen – Band 1.2: Oberflächen der Theorie – Band 2.1: Bildtechniken des Ausnahmezustandes – Band 2.2: Instrumente des Sehens – Band 3.1: Bildtextile Ordnungen – Band 3.2: Digitale Form – Band 4.1: Farbstrategien – Band 4.2: Bilder ohne Betrachter – Band 5.1: Systemische Räume – Band 5.2: Imagination des Himmels – Band 6.1: Ikonographie des Gehirns – Band 6.2: Grenzbilder – Band 7.1: Bildendes Sehen – Band 7.2: Erscheinende Mathematik – Band 8.1: Kontaktbilder – Band 8.2: Graustufen
- (as editor of the series): Actus et Imago. Berliner Schriften für Bildaktforschung und Verkörperungsphilosophie (Hg; Horst Bredekamp, John Michael Krois und Jürgen Trabant, Berlin (de Gruyter) seit 2011.
- (as coeditor): IMAGE WORD ACTION. IMAGO SERMO ACTIO. BILD WORT AKTION (Hg.: Horst Bredekamp, David Freedberg, Sabine Marienberg, Marion Lauschke, Jürgen Trabant) seit 2017. * (as coeditor): +ultra knowledge & gestaltung (Hg.: Nikola Doll, Horst Bredekamp and Wolfgang Schäffner for the Cluster of Excellence Image Knowledge Gestaltung. An Interdisciplinary Laboratory at Humboldt Universität zu Berlin), Leipzig 2017.

== Honors and Prizes ==
- 2001: Sigmund Freud Prize for scientific prose of the German Academy for Language and Poetry, Darmstadt
- 2004: Aby-M.-Warburg-Prize of the City of Hamburg
- 2006: Max-Planck-Science Prize of the Max Planck Society and the Humboldt Foundation
- 2009: Richard Hamann Prize of the Philipps-Universität Marburg for outstanding scientific achievements in the history of art
- 2010: Meyer-Struckmann Prize for Human and Social Science Research
- 2010: Full member of the Academia Europaea
- 2012: Fritz Winter Prize of the Fritz Winter Foundation
- 2012: Berlin Science Prize
- 2014: Pour le Mérite
- 2015: Order of Merit of the Federal Republic of Germany with star
- 2016: Member of the American Academy of Arts and Sciences
- 2017: Schiller Prize of the City of Marbach
- 2022: Laurea Honoris Causa in Philosophy by the Università di Torino, Italy
- 2024: Member of the Bavarian Academy of Fine Arts
- 2024: Order of Merit of the Italian Republic
