= Conrad von Soest =

Westphalian painter (c. 1370–c. 1422)

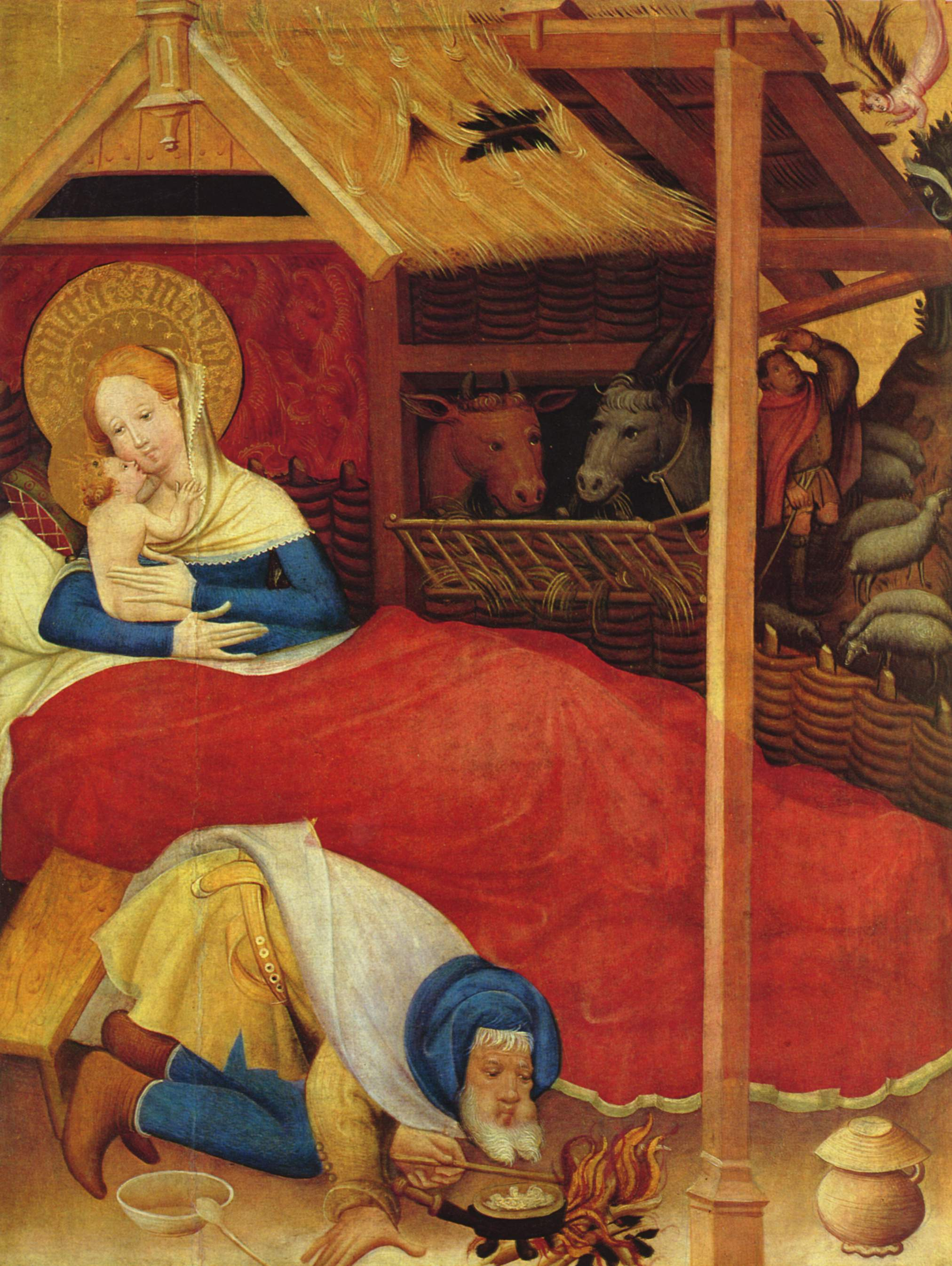
- Nativity from the Niederwildungen Altarpiece
- Born: 1370; Dortmund
- Died: 1422 (aged 51–52)
- Movement: International Gothic

Conrad von Soest, also Konrad in modern texts, or in Middle High German Conrad van Sost or "von Soyst", (born around 1370 in Dortmund; died soon after 1422) was the most significant Westphalian artist and painted in the so-called soft style of International Gothic. He played a leading role in the introduction of this International Courtly Style to Northern Germany around 1390 and influenced German and Northern European painting into the late 15th century. He was the master of a thriving workshop and was accepted into the social circle of the cosmopolitan patrician elite of Dortmund. Dortmund was then a leading and very prosperous member of the influential Hanseatic League.

== Works ==
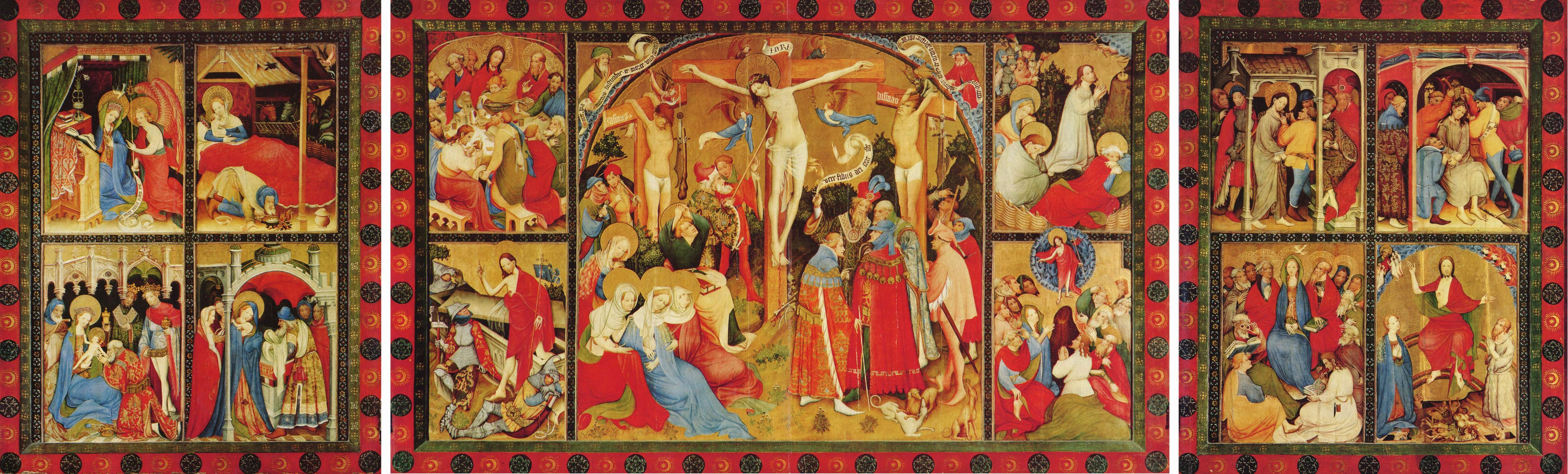
Niederwildungen altarpiece from Bad Wildungen

Conrad von Soest's main surviving works are influenced by French illuminated manuscripts and certain early Parisian examples of Early Netherlandish painting; his detailed knowledge of Parisian patterns and techniques points towards a sojourn in Paris as a journeyman in the 1380s:

- Niederwildungen Altarpiece, a Crucifixion Altarpiece in the protestant Stadtkirche of Bad Wildungen: large winged altarpiece, originally dated 1403. It shows scenes from the Life of the Virgin and the Passion of Christ, including the oldest known depiction of glasses north of the Alps. A contemporary local chronicle (rubbed condition) is written on the reverse side of the central panel. The predella is missing.
- Panel from a small portable altarpiece for the Dortmund family of Berswordt with a depiction of "St. Paul" and with "Reinoldus" as a knight on the reverse side, dated to 1404, Alte Pinakothek Munich.
- Two small panels, showing "St. Odilia" and "St. Dorothea", painted around 1410, Westf. Landesmusem Münster.
- Marienaltar, a large triptych with scenes from the Life of the Virgin, in the Marienkirche at Dortmund, dated to around 1420. The three panels have been cut in 1720 to fit into a huge baroque framework but are now reassembled in a modern framework. The lunette and predella of the altarpiece are lost.
- Attributed: Nikolaustafel, a panel showing St. Nikolas, Nikolai Chapel at Soest.

== Life ==
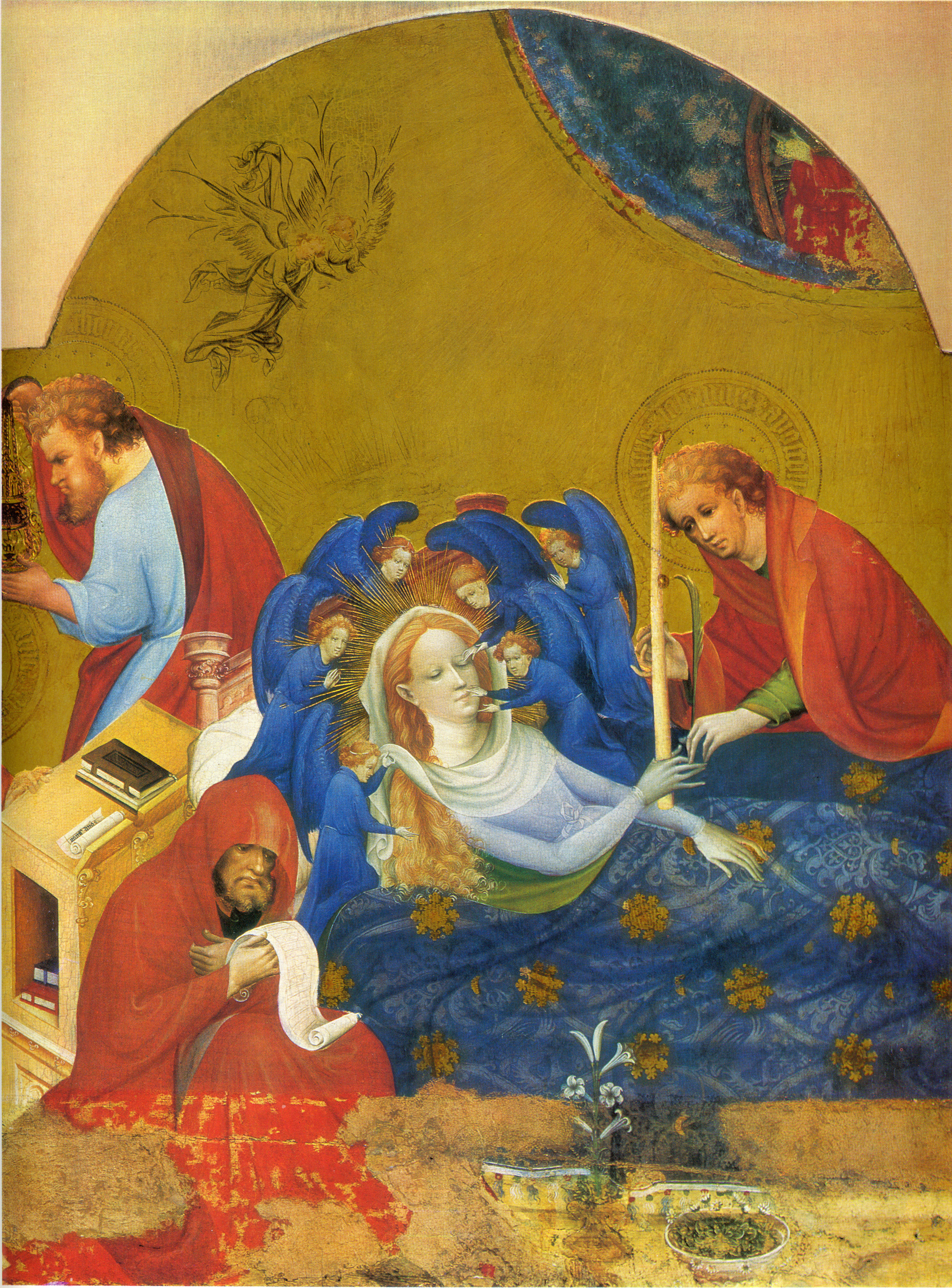
Marienaltar in the Marienkirche, Dortmund.

=== Sources ===
The surviving documents relevant to Conrad von Soest are:

- A, now rubbed, inscription of his name (and the date 1403) on the wooden frame of the Niederwilungen Altarpiece;
- A hidden signature was discovered in the Dortmund altarpiece by Rolf Fritz in the 1950s
- References to the family name in the Dortmund's Register of New Citizens: "Wernerus pictor" who became a citizen in 1331, "Wernerus pictor de Sosato", naturalised in 1348; furthermore, a "hinricus de Sosato", profession decaurator (gilder), naturalised in 1306;
- a marriage contract with Gertrude van Munster, dated 11.2.1394 (see below);
- his name appears in membership lists of Marienbruderschaften (Confraternities of St. Mary) in Dortmund: of St. Marien in 1396 as "Conrad meler et uxor" ("Conrad painter and wife"), resident in the main street, the Osterhellweg, as well as of St. Nikolai in 1396 as "Mester Conrad, meler"(master Conrad, painter). The last listing of his name in these membership lists appears in 1422.
- a painter 'Gerhard von Soyst' (Soest), a very prosperous member of the Cologne painters' guild, is recorded in 1417 as liable to additional wealth tax. As the name is not common and the profession ran in families, it seems reasonable to surmise that Gerhard was Conrad's son. It is interesting in this respect to note that the so-called Master of St. Veronica (Meister der hl. Veronika) was familiar with Conrad's workshop practices and patterns.

=== Citizen of Dortmund ===
As the name 'Conrad von Soest' does not appear in the list of new citizens and as his marriage contract was written in the form reserved for Dortmund citizens, he was clearly born to a Dortmund family.

=== Marriage contract ===
The marriage contract ("Morgensprache"), made before witnesses, between "Conrad von Soest" and "Gertrude, daughter of Lambertes van Munster", is dated February 11, 1394. The couple was able to dispose of a considerably sum each in this contract. Another unusual aspect of the contract is the number and quality of the witnesses: 6 members of the cosmopolitan, prosperous and well-educated patriciate of Dortmund, among them the second mayor of the current council, Herrmann Klepping, the tertiary council member, Detmar Klepping, and both mayors already elected for the following council year, Arnd Sudermann and Lambert Berswordt. The wealth of the groom and the eminent witnesses may well indicate that this was a second marriage. (A master had to marry before he could open his own workshop and it would then have taken a while to earn such wealth).

=== Painter of Dortmund ===
According to the membership list of the Confraternity of Mary of 1396, Conrad von Soest lived in the Ostenhellweg, Dortmund's principal thoroughfare. The list also refers to two other painters resident in the Ostenhellweg, Lambert and Hermann. It is unclear whether they were his journeymen, living in his house, or masters presiding over their own workshops in the same street.

Since 1954, the Landschaftsverband Westfalen-Lippe (Landscape Society Westphalia-Lippe) has awarded the Konrad-von-Soest Prize for Visual Arts, endowed with 12,800 euros.

== Sources and notes ==
Attribution

== Literature ==
- Horst Appuhn: "St. Marien in Dortmund", in: Konrad Lorenz, Die Ev. St. Marienkirche zu Dortmund, published by the Mariengemeinde, Dortmund 1981, pp. 18–47 (German)
- Brigitte Buberl (ed.): Conrad von Soest : neue Forschungen über den Maler und die Kulturgeschichte der Zeit um 1400 (Essay collection on the occasion of the symposium of the same title in 2001); Gütersloh : Verl. für Regionalgeschichte, 2004, ISBN 3-89534-521-0 (German)
- Brigitte Corley: Conrad von Soest, Maler unter Fuerstlichen Kaufherren, Berlin (Gebr. Mann), 2000, ISBN 3-7861-2293-8 (German)
- Brigitte Corley: Conrad von Soest: Painter Among Merchant Princes (Harvey Miller Publishers), London 1996, ISBN 1-872501-58-3
- Brigitte Corley: "Painting and Patronage in Cologne, 1300-1500", (Harvey Miller Publishers), Turnhout 2000, ISBN 1-872501-51-6
- Arthur Engelbert: Conrad von Soest. Ein Maler um 1400, ISBN 3-88375-222-3 (German) for a postmodern interpretation and excellent photographs
- Rolf Friz: "Conrad von Soest als Zeichner", Westfalen 31, 1953, pp.. 10-18 (German); and a number of other excellent publications by this author
- Thomas Schilp and Barbara Welzel (ed.), Dortmund und Conrad von Soest im spätmittelalterlichen Europa, Bielefeld (Verlag für Regionalgeschichte) 2004, ISSN 1612-8648, ISBN 3-89534-533-4 (German)
- Alfred Stange: Conrad von Soest, Königstein i. Ts: Langewiesche, (1966)
- Luise von Winterfeld, "Meister Konrad von Soest, ein geborener Dortmunder Bürger und andere Dortmunder Maler", in: Beiträge zur Geschichte Dortmunds und der Grafschaft Mark 32, 1925, pp. 141–145 (German)
- Luise von Winterfeld, "Kleine Beiträge zu Konrad von Soest", in: Beiträge zur Geschichte Dortmunds und der Grafschaft Mark 47, 1948, pp. 5–23 (German)
