= Main Library of Cardinal Stefan Wyszynski University, Warsaw =

Main Library of Cardinal Stefan Wyszyński University in Warsaw
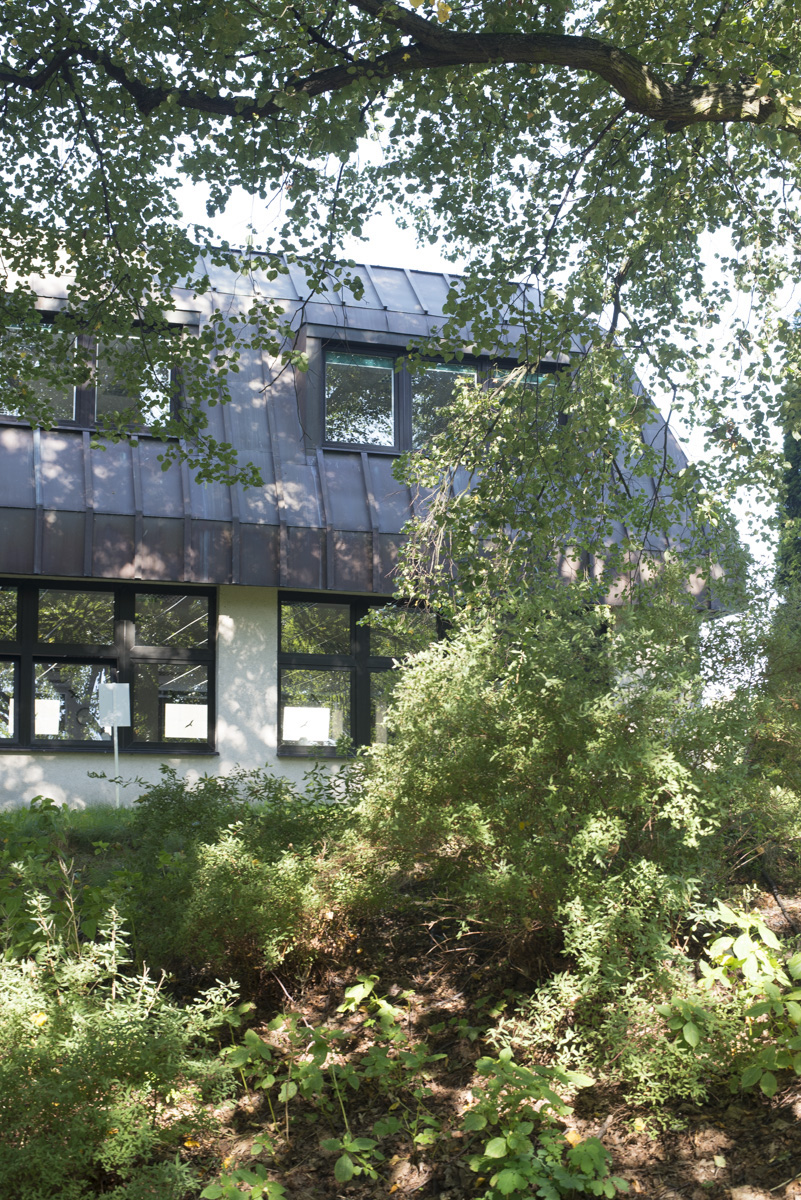
- 52°17′42″N 20°57′35″E
- Location: Warsaw, Poland, Poland
- Type: Academic library
- Established: 1954
- Branches: 1 (Wóycickiego campus)

Collection
- Size: 482 000 vol.

Access and use
- Population served: academic community
- Members: 20,000

Other information
- Director: MA Tomasz Winiarski, Acting Director
- Website: http://www.biblioteka.uksw.edu.pl/en/node/597

The Main Library of Cardinal Stefan Wyszyński University in Warsaw (Polish: Biblioteka Główna Uniwersytetu Kardynała Stefana Wyszyńskiego w Warszawie) is the central research library of the Cardinal Stefan Wyszyński University in Warsaw.

It is located in Bielanski Forest Nature Reserve, next to the historic Camaldolese Church and hermitage buildings, which date back to the 17th and 18th century.

The library was founded in 1954 with a 30,000-volume donation by the Theological Faculty of Warsaw and Jagiellionian Universities. Today, it is associated with the four other faculty libraries the University Library System, operating on two university campuses—Dewajtis and Wóycickiego, headed by the director of the University Library.

The University Library holds nearly 500,000 printed items, with literary collections concerning theology, philosophy, history, psychology, and social sciences. It is also well known for having the largest ecclesiastical sciences book collection in Poland.

The UKSW library is a member and the co-founder of the Federation of Church Libraries, also known as "Fides".

== History ==
The library started its activity on 3 November 1954 as a library of the Warsaw Theological Academy.

The main collection was merged from the donation of Theological Faculties of Warsaw University and Jagiellionian University. At the beginning of 1955, the collection had over 30,000 volumes.

At the beginnings the library suffered some difficulties due to the lack of staff and enough storage space. Books were located in many different buildings, which made them hardly accessible.

In March 1955, the main lecture room with the reference collection was opened. On 1 October 1955, the first rector of ATK, Rev. Associate Professor Jan Czuj, approved the library's new statute.

Similar to other academic library structures, departments of acquisition, cataloging of monographs and periodicals, stacks and circulation with main reading and lending room and were created.

Since the beginning, the university's Library aggregated academic literature, consisting mainly of theological, canon law, Christian philosophy, history and social sciences subject. In 1966, the library acquired book collections from other university faculties. Cooperation with other Polish and foreign libraries and research centers started over the next few years. This cooperation, which involved the purchase of new books and other donations, made the collection grow to almost 90,000 volumes in the beginning of the 70s. By 1982, the collection was already 153,000 volumes large, and grew to 200,000 in 1990 and 265.000 in 2003.

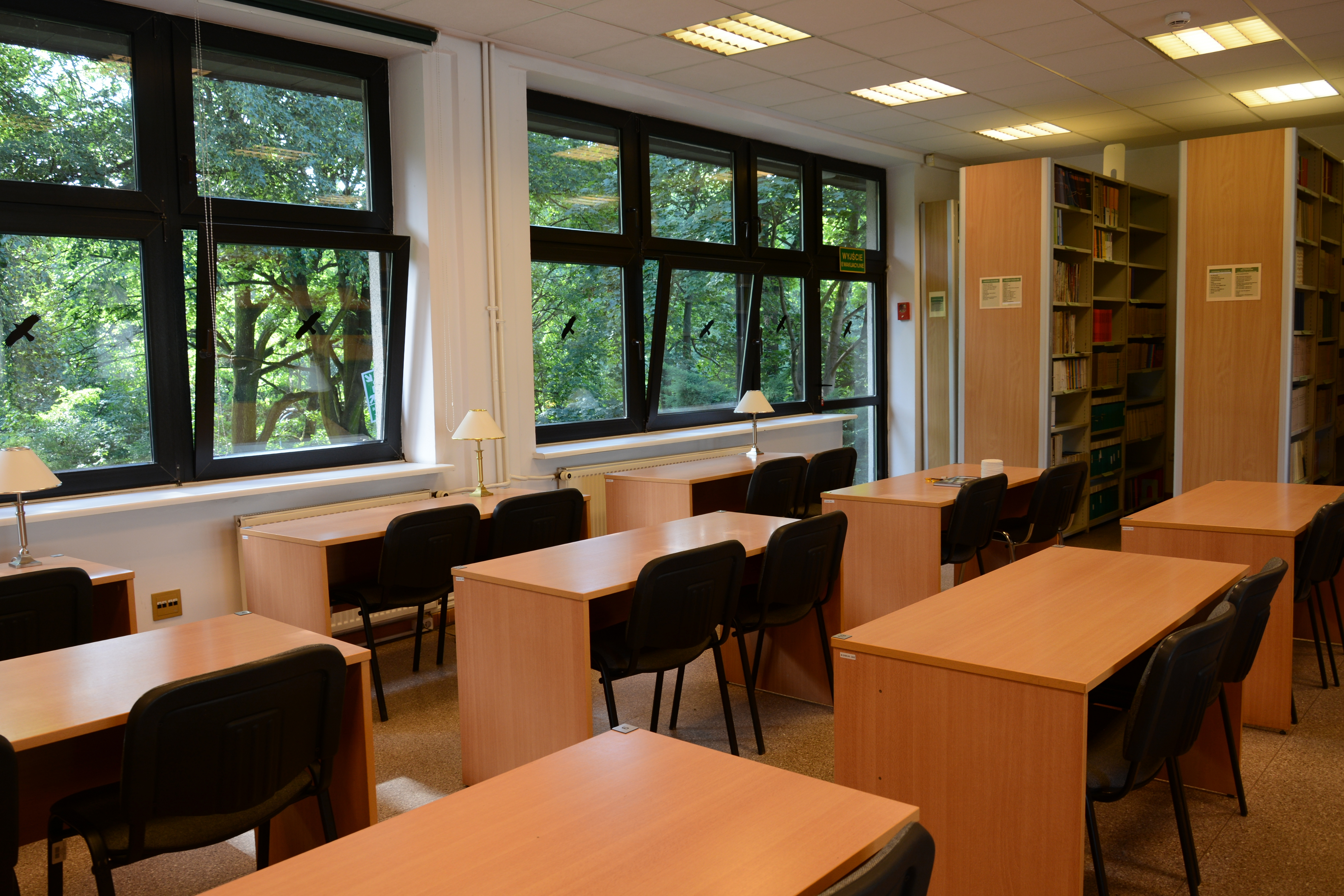
Library_reading_room

The Main Library has been expanded with the creation of new university faculties. First, the faculty library was established at the Faculty of Family Studies. Next, the libraries of the Faculties of Humanities, History, Social Sciences, Education, Law, and Administration were created. The Main Library adapted and extended its collection according to the profiles of new faculties.

For long-term preservation library established cooperation with other science centers and universities, including the Academy of Fine Arts in Warsaw. One of the academy's research projects conducted the conservation of library's old prints and incurables compilation.

In the 1990s, the informatization of the Main Library started. In years 1993–1996, the OPAC catalogue for the monographs and old prints was created. In 1995, the Main Library, with two other libraries (the Library of the Pontifical University of John Paul II in Cracow, and the Library of the Metropolitan Seminary in Warsaw), and was co-founder of the Federation of the Church Libraries (Fides). One of the Fides' goals was computerization of library's processes. In 1997, the Main Library established Internet connection and launched its first webpage.

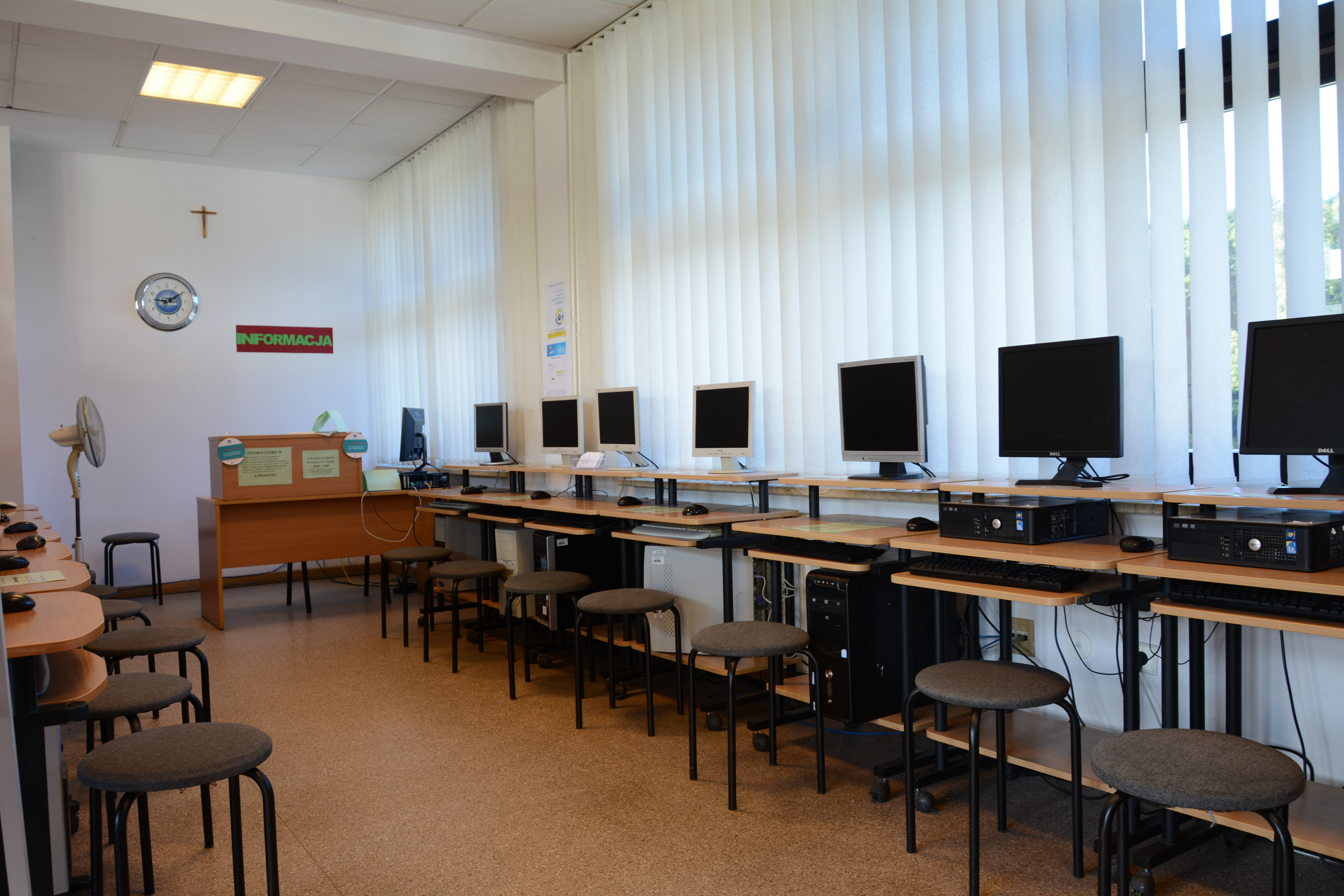
Reference desk and computers for users

In 1999, the Warsaw Theological Academy was transformed into the Cardinal Stefan Wyszyński University. The Main Library was moved to a new building.

== Collection ==
Main Library gathers, preserves, and circulates interdisciplinary literature, with the dominance of humanities, theological, social sciences, and law publications. From the beginning of the 21st century, mathematics, physics, chemistry, and biological collections are also being gathered.

Collection of Main Library consists of (on day 31 December 2017):

Books	319 206 volumes
Periodicals	123 849 volumes
Special collection	39 418 volumes (29 239 manuscripts, 932 old prints, 2268 music sheets, 978 cartographic documents)

One of the treasures of the library's old print collection is Biblia Sacra utriusque Testamenti, printed in 1530 in Nunberg. This Vulgate's Latin edition was published when the German translation of the New Testament was already announced by Martin Luther. It is covered with beautiful wood engravings attributed to Albrecht Dürer.

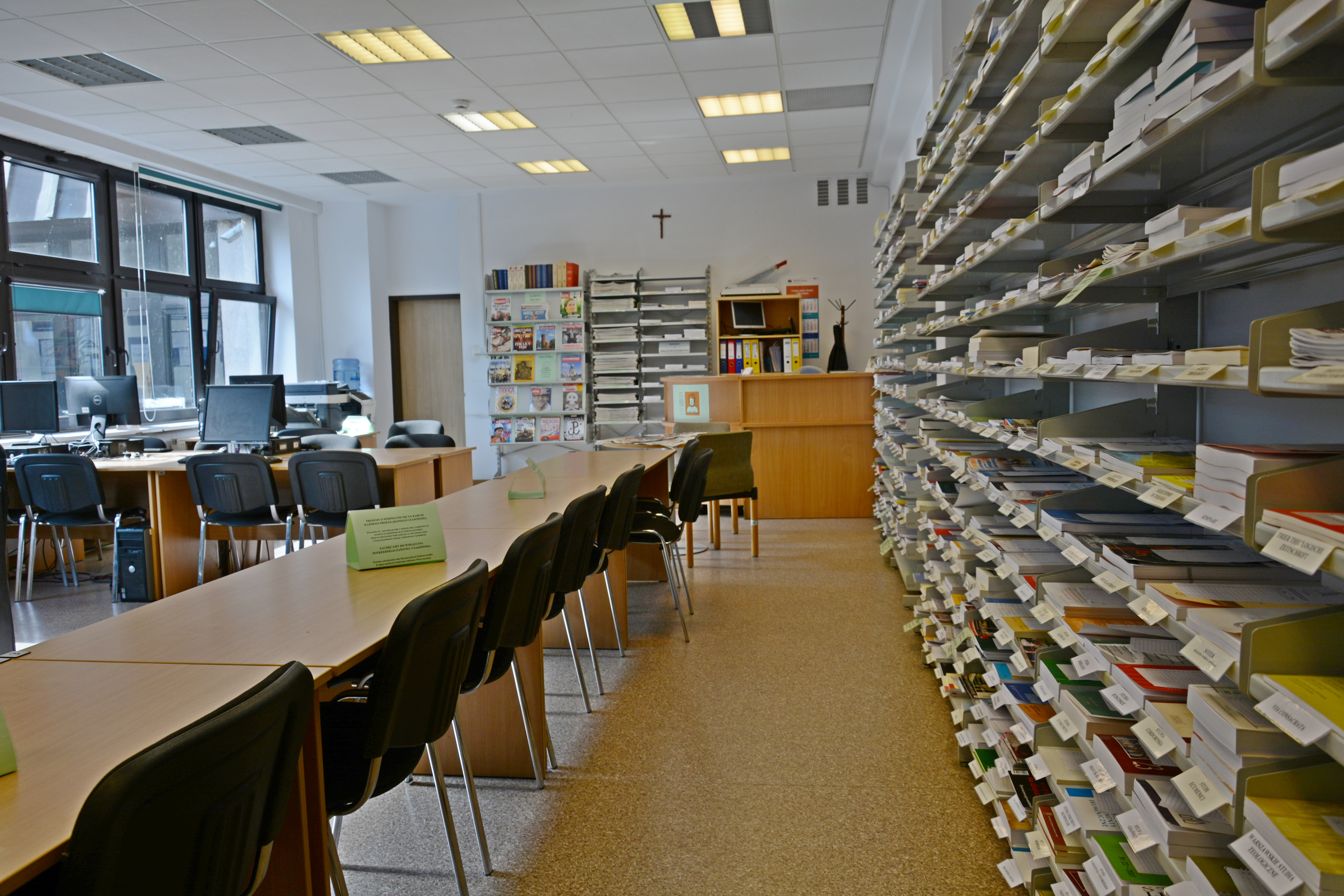
Periodicals Reading Room

The library gathers collections of previous Cardinal Stefan Wyszyński University professors, including Witold Tyloch, ks. Janusz Stanisław Pasierb, Czesław Zgorzelski, Andrzej Ciechanowiecki, Lothar Ruppert, and books of World Association of Home Army Soldiers.

The library preserves most valuable items and arranges their conservation and restoration process.

Since 2016, digital copies are published in Fides' Digital Library and Polona (National Library of Poland digital library).

The Main Library building has 1507 m^{2} of space. Users can access the library's collection in two Reading Rooms (main and periodical), where 70 seats are available. Books can be borrowed by Cardinal Stefan Wyszyński University students, doctoral students, researchers, and other employees. 24 computers connected to Internet with many academic databases and a self-service A3 scanner are also available.

Since 2016, the library is a member of a digital interlibrary loan system which gives access to Academica service (for books and periodicals).

== Structure ==
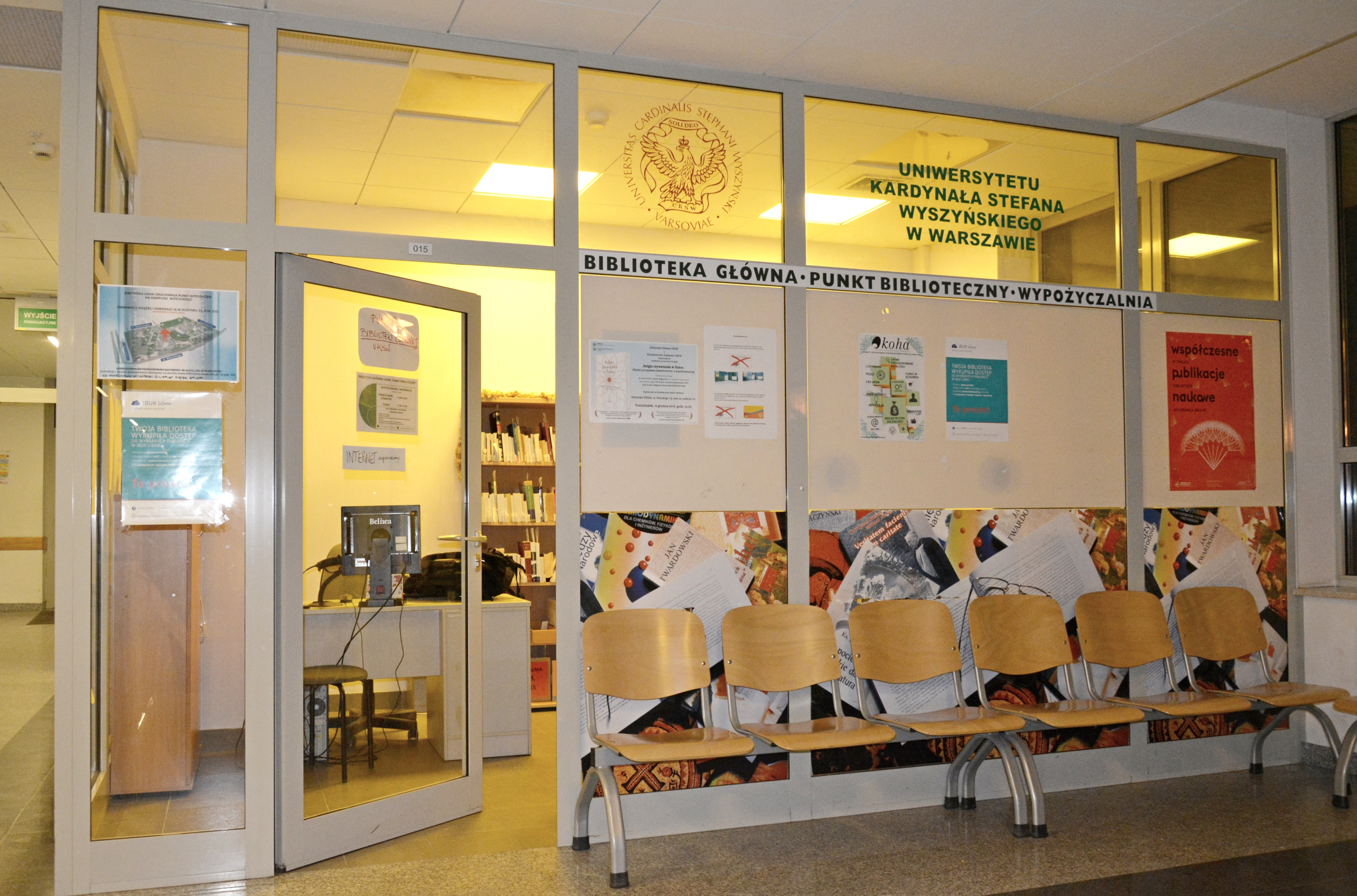
Main library branch at the Woycickiego campus

- Department of Scientific Information and Knowledge Transfer
- Circulation and Preservation Department
- Acquisition and Selection Department
- Cataloguing Department
- Library's branch at the Wóycicki Campus

== Library information system ==
The library's information system is managed by the Director of the Main Library. The Main Library is the base of the system connected with four faculty libraries:

- Library of Faculty of History and Social Sciences
- Library of Faculty of Humanities
- Library of Faculty of Education
- Library of Faculty of Law and Administration
- Library Heads and Directors

Heads

1954–1956	MA Barbara Wilejszyc
1956–1961	Fr. MA Czesław Borawski
1962–1966	Fr. PhD Aleksander Grabowski

Directors

1966–1971	Fr. PhD Mirosław Szegda
1971–1980	Fr. PhD Czesław Baran OFM Conv
1980–1983	MA Andrzej Dziubecki
1983–1991	MA Andrzej Dubec (acting director)
1991–2013	Ma Piotr Latawiec
2013-2018	PhD Katarzyna Materska prof. UKSW
2018-	MA Tomasz Winiarski (acting director)

== See also ==
- Cardinal Stefan Wyszyński University in Warsaw
- List of libraries in Poland

== Bibliography ==
- Baran, Ks. Czesław; Murawiec, Ks. Wiesław Franciszek (1976). XX lat Akademii Teologii Katolickiej. Księga Pamiątkowa 1954–1974. Warsaw: Akademia Teologii Katolickiej.
- [bez autora]: Historia. W: Strona Biblioteki Uniwersytetu Kardynała Stefana Wyszyńskiego w Warszawie [on-line]. Uniwersytet Kardynała Stefana Wyszyńskiego w Warszawie, 2014. [dostęp 2017-12-06].
- Latawiec, Piotr. Biblioteka Główna Uniwersytetu Kardynała Stefana Wyszyńskiego w Warszawie. „Forum Bibliotek Medycznych. Medical Library Forum”. R. 5 (nr 2 (10)), s. 137–149 (PDF – 1–13), 2012. Dr Ryszard Żmuda (red. nacz.). Łódź: Uniwersytet Medyczny w Łodzi. ISSN 1899-5829. Retrieved 2017-12-06.
- Mandziuk, Ks. Józef (1999). Dzieje Akademii Teologii Katolickiej w Warszawie 1954–1999. Warsaw: Wydawnictwo Uniwersytetu Kardynała Stefana Wyszyńskiego. ISBN 8370721400.
- "Regulamin systemu biblioteczno-informacyjnego Uniwersytetu Kardynała Stefana Wyszyńskiego w Warszawie". Zarządzenie Nr 35/2016 Rektora UKSW z dnia 30 czerwca 2016 r. (załącznik). [Cardinal Stefan Wyszyński University in Warsaw]]. Monitor UKSW. monitor.uksw.edu.pl. 2016-06-30.
- Sprawozdanie Rektora UKSW w Warszawie z działalności uczelni w r.a. 2002–2003.Warsaw 2004. p. 84.
- Sprawozdanie Biblioteki UKSW dla GUS za rok 2016 [Report of the Main Library for the Central Statistical Office for 2016].
- Zarządzenie Nr 84/2016 Rektora Uniwersytetu Kardynała Stefana Wyszyńskiego w Warszawie z dnia 22 grudnia 2016 r. zmieniające Zarządzenie Nr 35/2016 Rektora Uniwersytetu Kardynała Stefana Wyszyńskiego w Warszawie z dnia 30 czerwca 2016 r. w sprawie Regulaminu systemu biblioteczno-informacyjnego Uniwersytetu Kardynała Stefana Wyszyńskiego w Warszawie. W: Monitor UKSW. monitor.uksw.edu.pl, 2016-12-22. Retrieved 2017-12-06.
