= Cardinal Stefan Wyszyński University in Warsaw =

Polish state university

Cardinal Stefan Wyszynski University in Warsaw
- Uniwersytet Kardynała Stefana Wyszyńskiego w Warszawie
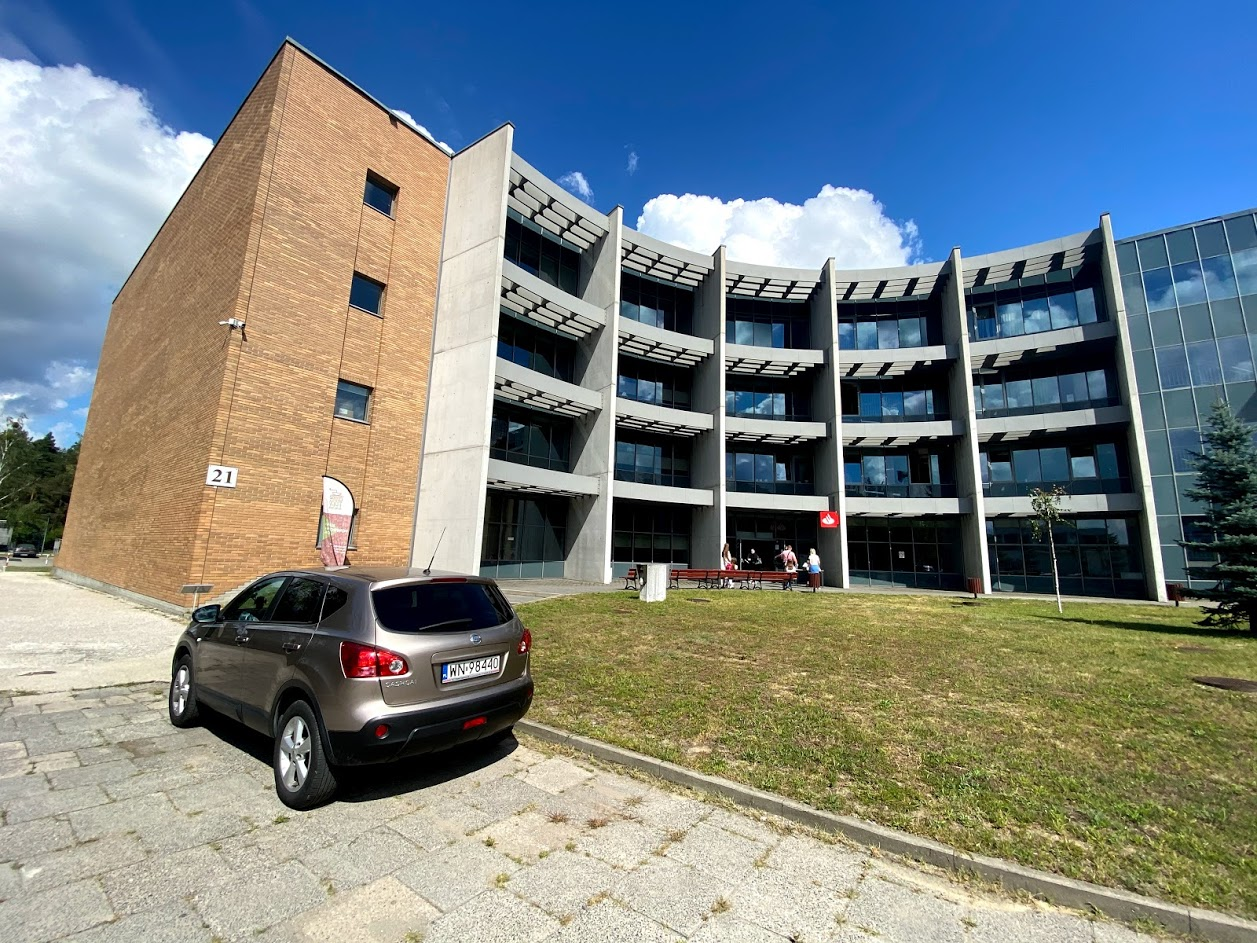
- Auditorium Maximum of the Cardinal Stefan Wyszynski University in Warsaw
- Latin: Universitas Cardinalis Stephani Wyszynski Varsoviae
- Motto: Soli Deo
- Motto in English: [Glory] To God alone
- Patron: Blessed Cardinal Stefan Wyszynski
- Type: Public University
- Established: 3 September 1999
- Affiliations: Socrates-Erasmus
- Rector: Rev. Prof. Dr. Hab. Ryszard Czekalski
- Academic staff: 760
- Total staff: over 1,100
- Students: 10,075 (12.2023)
- Location: 5 Dewajtis Street in Bielany, Warsaw, 01-815, Poland; 52°17′42″N 20°57′35″E
- Website: https://uksw.edu.pl/en

Cardinal Stefan Wyszynski University in Warsaw (UKSW; Latin: Universitas Cardinalis Stephani Wyszyński Varsoviae) is a Polish state university created on the basis of the Academy of Catholic Theology in Warsaw. UKSW is a public university that offers education in the humanities, social studies, and natural sciences, and, since 2019, medicine.

The university has twelve faculties located in two campuses in Warsaw's Bielany district: on Dewajtis and Wóycickiego Streets. The university offers forty majors, including medicine, psychology, law, journalism, environmental engineering, Italian philology, and economics.

In 2016, the Mazovian Laboratory Center of Life Sciences UKSW was established on the campus at the Wóycickiego Street site. In 2019, the university received the European Commission's "HR Excellence in Research" award, confirming its adherence to the principles of the European Charter for Researchers. In addition, all faculties of the university are under the supervision of the Minister of Science and Higher Education; four of them – the Faculties of Theology, of Christian Philosophy, of Canon Law and of Family Studies – are additionally supervised by church authorities.

== History ==
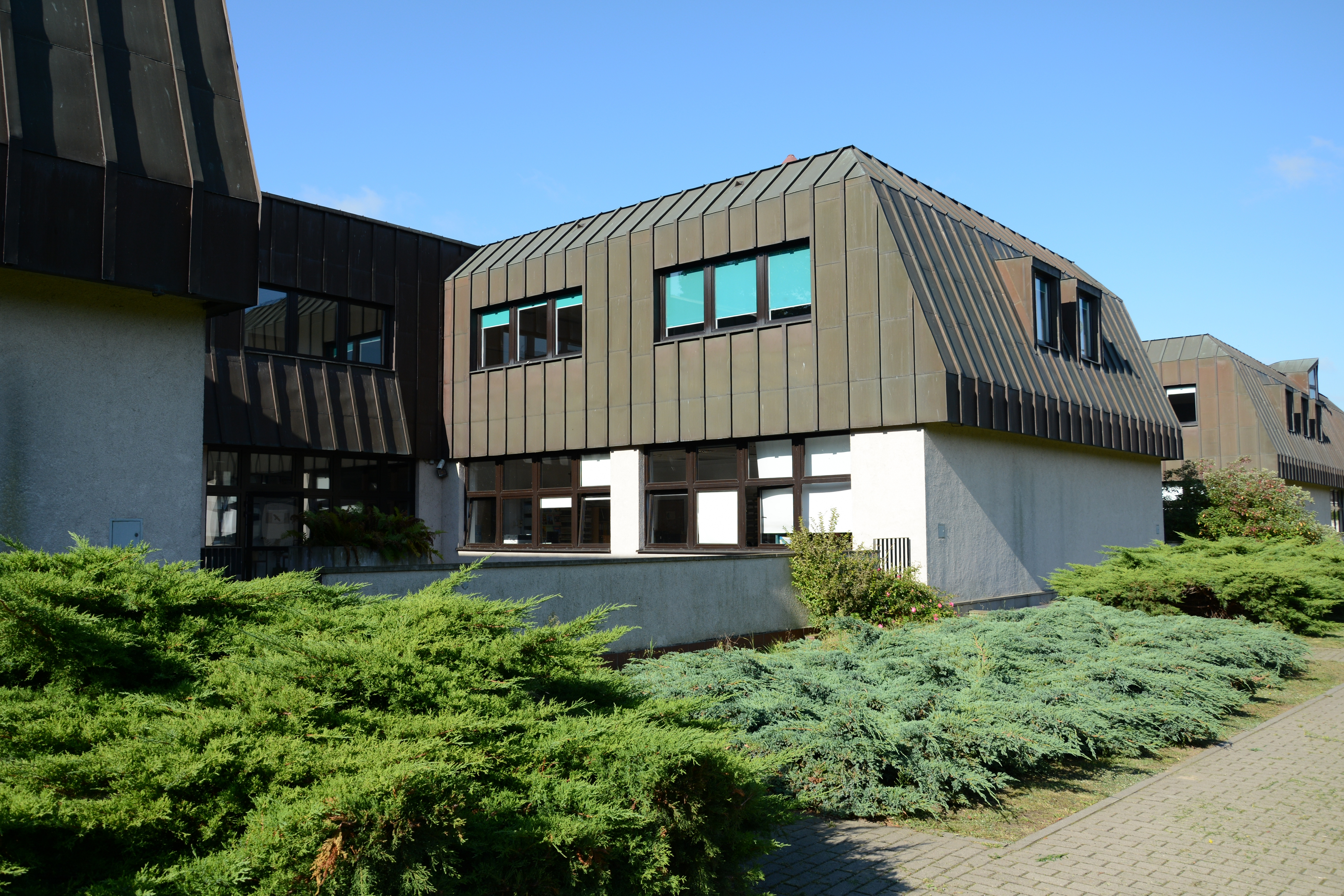
The Main Library of Cardinal Stefan Wyszyński University in Warsaw – Dewajtis campus

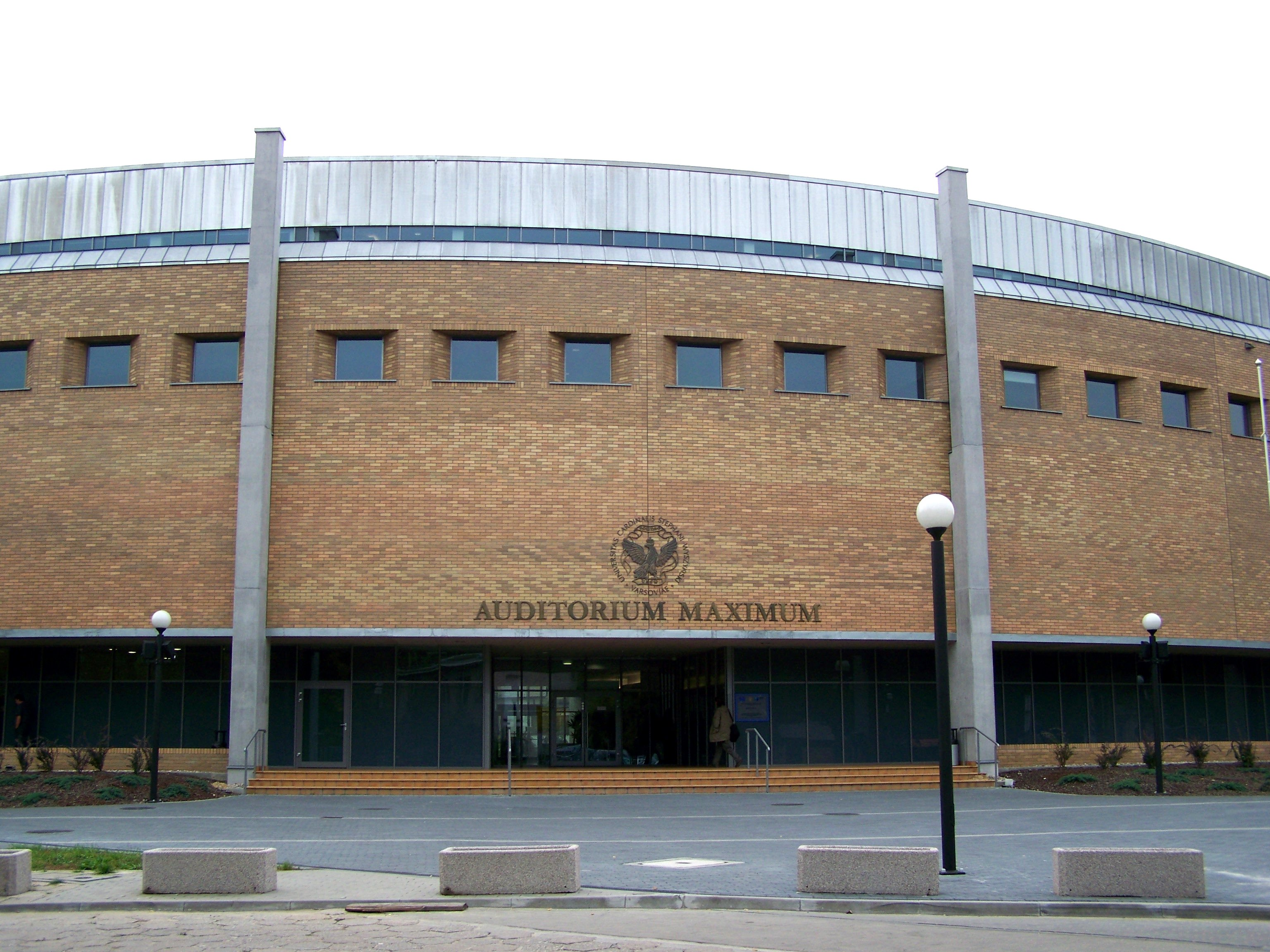
Auditorium Maximum in Młociny, at 1/3 Wóycickiego (building 21) - Wóycickiego campus

In 1954, the Faculty of Catholic Theology at the University of Warsaw and the Faculty of Theology at the Jagiellonian University were closed down. They were transformed into the Academy of Catholic Theology (ATK). At the same time, the Faculty of Evangelical Theology was removed from the University of Warsaw and became the basis for the multidenominational Christian Theological Academy in Warsaw (ChAT). In the same year, the authorities displaced the Marian Fathers – who had been operating from Polkowa Góra, the former-Camaldolese monastery, since 1915 – from the orders' monastic and hermitage site in Bielany, Warsaw; the newly-founded ATK was given the vacated monastery complex.

The Academy of Catholic Theology was a state university, established by a decision of the then Council of Ministers. According to canon law, theological faculties should be created or approved by the Holy See, so the creation of the new university was ill-received by the ecclesial community. Primate Stefan Wyszyński, then archbishop of Warsaw, was imprisoned in the years 1953–1956. After regaining his freedom, he did not immediately accept the university. Only since 1960, with the approval of the Holy See, did he respect the academy and consider himself grand chancellor of the university (the ecclesiastical authority and non-academic leader). The Academy of Catholic Theology was granted full ecclesiastical rights in 1989, henceforth becoming both a state and a church university.

In 1954, the Academy of Catholic Theology employed sixty faculty members. There were 415 students studying there. It had three faculties: Faculty of Theology, Faculty of Canon Law, and Faculty of Christian Philosophy. The university was fully funded by the state. The number of students allowed to enroll was strictly determined by the communist authorities of the Polish People's Republic. It was not until the 1980s that the number of students increased significantly. In 1987, the Faculty of Church Historical and Social Sciences was created from a portion of the Faculty of Theology.

Further development of the university took place in the 1990s: the number of professors and students increased, new majors were opened. Changes within the institution allowed it to become a university. It took place on 3 September 1999, and the university was named after Cardinal Stefan Wyszyński.

== Campuses ==
The university consists of two main campuses: the Dewajtis campus at 5 Dewajtis Street in Bielany; and the Wóycickiego campus at 1/3 Wóycickiego Street in Młociny.

Dewajtis Campus, in addition to teaching rooms, has the Main Library, the radio and television laboratory, the rector's office, and the headquarters of university authorities.

=== Wóycickiego-Młociny campus ===
The campus in Młociny is under ongoing expansion. On 14 February 2008, the first part of the Center for Education and Interdisciplinary Research – Auditorium Maximum (building no. 21) was opened there. It is where lecture rooms, laboratories and a student canteen are located. In February 2009, Building 23, which houses the Faculty of Historical and Social Sciences, the Faculty of Christian Philosophy, and the Faculty of Biology and Environmental Sciences, was completed. In 2015, the newly built Life Sciences Laboratory Center (building 24) was opened. In 2020, a modern field house was put into use. The headquarters of the Faculty of Medicine – Collegium Medicum and Multidisciplinary Research Centre (MCB) in Dziekanowo Leśne are under construction as of 2022.

=== Transport ===
The Wóycickiego Campus can be reached by several bus lines, including the line "114" leading directly to the campus gate from the Młociny metro station.

The Dewajtis Campus is about 1.1 km (0.68 mi) from the nearest tram stop.

== Governance ==
The head of the Cardinal Stefan Wyszynski University (UKSW) is the rector. The governing and administrative bodies of the university are the secretariat and the senate. Making up the secretariat are the positions of chancellor, deputy chancellor, and bursar, and their support staff. The senate enacts university regulations and consults with the rector on university management and development. It appoints members of the university council; the council's role is to advise the senate on policy.

In June 2020, Professor Ryszard Czekalski was elected rector of the university for a term of office from 2020 to 2024. Czekalski is a priest and canon of Płock Cathedral. His Doctor habilitatus degree in theology was conferred in 2014.

For the same term, Associate Professor Anna Fidelus was re-elected vice-rector for Student Affairs and Teaching in 2020, having held the office 2016–2020. Fidelus' Doctor habilitatus in social rehabilitation was awarded in 2013. Associate Professor Marek Stokłosa, who is vice-rector for Research and International Cooperation achieved his Doctor habilitatus in 2016 in the field of canon law.

The Grand Chancellor of the university oversees the church faculties of Theology, Christian Philosophy, Canon Law and Family Studies. From 2007, the Metropolitan Archbishop of Warsaw, Kazimierz Nycz, has held this position.

=== Earlier rectors ===
The following is a list of rectors of the ATK:

- 1954–1956 – Jan Czuj
- 1956–1965 – Wincenty Kwiatkowski
- 1965–1972 – Józef Iwanicki
- 1972–1981 – Jan Piotr Stępień
- 1981–1987 – Remigiusz Sobański
- 1987–1990 – Helmut Juros
- 1990–1996 – Jan Łach
- 1996–1999 – Roman Bartnicki

For UKSW, the position of rector has been held by:

- 1999–2005 – Roman Bartnicki
- 2005–2010 – Ryszard Rumianek
- 2010–2012 – Henryk Skorowski
- 2012–2020 – Stanisław Dziekoński

All of the above UKSW rectors had been conferred with the Doctor habilitatus (Dr. hab) degree.

== Honorary degrees ==
ATK has awarded doctorates honoris causa to the following people:

- 1982 – Józef Glemp, cardinal
- 1983 – Josef Georg Ziegler, professor (and priest)
- 1986 – Roger Schütz, religious brother
- 1989 – Édouard Boné, professor (and priest)
- 1989 – Antoni Liedtke, professor (and priest, a monsignor)
- 1990 – Lothar Ullrich, professor (and priest)
- 1990 – Józef Maria Bocheński, OP, academic, logician, philosopher and Dominican priest
- 1991 – Ignacy Tokarczuk, archbishop of Przemyśl
- 1992 – Norbert Höslinger, professor (and priest)
- 1992 – Franciszek Macharski, cardinal
- 1993 – Hans Waldenfels, SI, academic (in religion and philosophy), professor of fundamental theology, and Jesuit priest
- 1993 – Henryk Mikołaj Górecki, composer and academic (in music)
- 1994 – Jozef Tomko, cardinal
- 1994 – Feliks Bednarski (priest)
- 1995 – Alicja Grześkowiak, legal academic, Polish politician
- 1996 – Gabriel Adrianyi, professor (and priest)
- 1996 – Paul Nordhues, bishop
- 1997 – Karl Lehmann, academic (in theology), bishop of Mainz and later, cardinal
- 1997 – Joseph Isensee, professor
- 1998 – Zenon Grocholewski, academic (in canon law), cardinal

== Students and staff ==
In the 2020-2021 academic year, about 10,000 students were studying at the UKSW, and about 800 academic teachers were employed. There are 300 employees in the library, administration and service.

There are many student organizations at the university, including the Student Government, the UKSW Independent Students' Union, the UKSW Erasmus Student Network, and scientific clubs.

== Faculties and fields of study ==
Cardinal Stefan Wyszynski University currently has twelve faculties and over forty majors, such as:

- Faculty of Theology:
1. Institute of Theological Sciences: theology (general theology, theology, specialization: teaching - catechetical, missiology, coaching and social mediation, biblical lands tourism studies), religious studies
2. Institute of Media Education and Journalism: journalism and social communication, theology (media education and journalism)
- Faculty of Canon Law: Canon law
- Faculty of Christian Philosophy:
1. Institute of Philosophy: philosophy, philosophy and culture of East-Central Europe
2. Institute of Psychology: psychology
3. Center for Ecology and Ecophilosophy: environment conservation, sustainability studies
- Faculty of Historical Sciences:
1. Institute of Archaeology: archaeology, management of cultural heritage
2. Institute of History of Art: history of art, cultural property and environmental protection
3. Institute of History: history, history (history of Mediterranean civilization)
- Faculty of Social and Economic Sciences:
1. Institute of Political Sciences and Administration: political science, European studies, internal security
2. Institute of Sociology: sociology, social work
3. Institute of Economics and Finance: economy
- Faculty of Law and Administration: law, administration, international relations, man in cyberspace
- Faculty of Humanities:
1. Institute of Polish Philology: polish philology
2. Institute of Classical Philology and Cultural Studies: classical philology, Italian philology, cultural studies, museology
- Faculty of Family Studies: family studies
- Faculty of Mathematics and Natural Sciences. School of Exact Sciences:
1. Institute of Chemistry: chemistry
2. Institute of Computer Science: computer science
3. Institute of Mathematics: mathematics
4. Physics Department: physics
- Faculty of Education: philosophy of education and special education
- Faculty of Biology and Environmental Sciences: biology and environmental engineering
- Faculty of Medicine – Collegium Medicum: medicine, nursing

== See also ==
- Main Library of Cardinal Stefan Wyszynski University in Warsaw
- Articles from Polish Wikipedia (in Polish):
  - Rezerwat przyrody Las Bielański – 'Bielański Forest Nature Reserve'
  - Erasmus Student Network
  - Wielki kanclerz – 'Grand Chancellor'
  - Niezależne Zrzeszenie Studentów – 'Independent Students' Union'
  - Wydział Biologii i Nauk o Środowisku Uniwersytetu Kardynała Stefana Wyszyńskiego – 'Faculty of Biology and Environmental Sciences'
  - Wydział Filozofii Chrześcijańskiej Uniwersytetu Kardynała Stefana Wyszyńskiego – 'Faculty of Christian Philosophy'
  - Wydział Nauk Historycznych i Społecznych Uniwersytetu Kardynała Stefana Wyszyńskiego – 'Faculty of Historical and Social Sciences'
