= Bildwissenschaft =

Bildwissenschaft is an academic discipline in the German-speaking world. Similar to visual studies, and defined in relation to art history, Bildwissenschaft (approximately, "image-science") refers to a number of different approaches to images, their interpretation and their social significance.

Originating in the early 20th century, the field has become more prominent since the 1990s. In the contemporary period, significant theorists and practitioners of Bildwissenschaft have included Klaus Sachs-Hombach, Gottfried Boehm, Hans Belting, Horst Bredekamp and Lambert Wiesing, each of whom have developed distinct orientations toward their subject matter.

== Etymology ==
Wissenschaft (from Wissen, meaning "knowledge") is similar in meaning to "science", but is used differently and with different connotations. Whereas "science" typically refers specifically to empirical investigations in the natural sciences and social sciences, Wissenschaft does not carry the same methodological implications. Nevertheless, Wissenschaft is more restrictive than the English "studies", as it indicates the systematic ordering of knowledge, that attention be paid to questions of method, and that a discipline aspire to a comprehensive treatment of its subject.

Similarly, Bild is close in meaning to "image", but refers to pictures of all kinds, both representational and abstract, including paintings, drawings, photographs, computer-generated images, film and sculpture; illustrations, figures, maps and diagrams; and mental images and metaphors.

== Overview ==
Bildwissenschaft expands the parameters of art history to encompass, and to take seriously, images of all kinds. The polysemic character of the term Bild has been embraced by proponents of Bildwissenschaft as a means of encouraging interdisciplinarity and collaboration. This characteristic also facilitates the avoidance of any distinction between high culture and low culture. Accordingly, Bildwissenschaft incorporates not only the study of "low culture" images but also of scientific, architectural and cartographic images and diagrams.

Bildwissenschaft occupies a more central role in the liberal arts and humanities in German-speaking nations than that afforded to art history or visual studies in the United States and United Kingdom. The tendency in the English-speaking world to see art history and visual studies as entirely distinct disciplines has carried over into the German and Austrian context to an extent, and efforts to define Bildwissenschaft in opposition to art history have been pursued.

Significant differences between Bildwissenschaft and Anglophone cultural and visual studies include the former's examination of images dating from the early modern period, and its emphasis on continuities over breaks with the past. Whereas Anglo-American visual studies can be seen as a continuation of critical theory in its attempt to reveal power relations, Bildwissenschaft is not explicitly political.

Charlotte Klonk has argued that Bildwissenschaft is ontological rather than historical, concerned with fundamental questions "of what images are able to achieve in general and what distinguishes them from other vehicles of knowledge." Matthew Rampley describes Bildwissenschaft as "a heterogeneous and disunified field that encompasses widely divergent and often competing interests and approaches."

== History ==
The major elements of Bildwissenschaft were developed in Germany and Austria in the period from 1900 to 1933. Art historians including Herman Grimm, Wilhelm Lübke, Anton Heinrich Springer, Jacob Burckhardt, Heinrich Wölfflin and Erwin Panofsky, all of whom saw value in photographs and slides, contributed to the development of Bildwissenschaft. After 1970 it saw a revival and began to incorporate the study of advertising, photography, film and video, political symbolism, digital art and Internet art. The development of Bildwissenschaft to an extent paralleled that of the field of visual culture in the United Kingdom and United States. Rampley suggests that while the discipline's development can be situated as part of a wider process in Anglophone scholarship, as well as in France, Spain and Italy, such an account is accurate "only in the most general sense of a shift away from art history as the master discourse governing interpretation and analysis of the image."

Bildwissenschaft subsequently influenced the structuralism of Claude Lévi-Strauss and the habitus theory of Pierre Bourdieu, as well as developments in art history.

Klonk argues that the re-emergence of Bildwissenschaft within art history after 1998 was the result of, first, the contention that the circulation of images in mass media had the effect of reconfiguring previously text-based societies as image-based societies; second, that the methodologies of the discipline of art history were well-suited to apprehending this new conjuncture; and, third, that art history's focus would of necessity expand to encompass (for example) scientific imagery, advertisements and popular culture. Work in Bildwissenschaft in the 2000s and 2010s has tended to argue that linguistic theories of meaning and interpretation cannot be applied to the visual realm, which has sui generis characteristics, and that prevalent approaches to art history unjustifiably prioritise the linguistic over the visual.

Gilles Deleuze, Aby Warburg, Carl Justi, Carl Schmitt, Pierre Bourdieu and Paul Feyerabend have been identified as precursors of modern Bildwissenschaft.

In 2012, Rampley wrote that Bildwissenschaft "is increasingly gaining currency as the denominator of a new set of theoretical discourses" in the German-speaking world, and had been the subject of several books offering introductions to the field, but emphasised that this was not indicative of "a single unified field".

== Theorists and practitioners ==
=== Klaus Sachs-Hombach ===
In the 1990s and 2000s, Klaus Sachs-Hombach used the concept in his discussion of the semantics and psychology of images, and the possibility in semiotics of an analogy between images and texts, an analogy he called into question. Sachs-Hombach's conception of Bildwissenschaft frames the concept in terms of theoretical issues of cognition and models of interpretation.

His edited volume Bildwissenschaft: Disziplinen, Themen, Methoden (2005) draws together work by experts across 28 disciplines (including art history) to argue for the possibility of a universal and interdisciplinary Bildwissenschaft that would function not as a wholly new discipline, but rather as a "common theoretical framework that could provide an integrative research programme for the various disciplines". Understood in this way, Sachs-Hombach argued that Bildwissenschaft should integrate and systematise insights from these various bodies of knowledge, analyse and define a set of common basic concepts, and develop strategies for interdisciplinary co-operation. Jason Gaiger has argued that Sachs-Hombach's work is the best representation "of Bildwissenschaft as an interdisciplinary research project".

=== Gottfried Boehm ===
Gottfried Boehm's account of the concept drew on aesthetics and the work of Maurice Merleau-Ponty, Hans-Georg Gadamer, Hans Jonas, Arthur Danto, Meyer Schapiro, Kurt Bauch and Max Imdahl. Boehm addressed questions around the phenomenology of viewing and pictorial representation and the question of medium. He also sought to understand the cognitive processes involved in the presentation and perception of images, and their differences from linguistic processes.

=== Hans Belting ===
Hans Belting, in 2001, offered another account, which sought to develop an anthropological theory of the image in order to examines its universal functions that span cultural distinctions, and considered the relationship between the image and the body. Belting examined images used in religious contexts in order to identify the original non-artistic functions of images today considered art objects, and argued that "art" was a unit of analysis had emerged in the 16th century that obstructed corporeal engagements with images.

In Likeness and Presence (1990), Belting argued for the necessity of understanding the ways images give meaning to their contexts, rather than gaining meaning from their contexts, in order to understand images as actors with their own agency. Belting argues that art history as a disciplinary formation is outmoded and potentially obsolete, and that a universal Bildwissenschaft, the exact scope and methods of which remain uncertain, should be sought.

=== Horst Bredekamp ===
Horst Bredekamp's 21st-century work considered the cognitive functions performed by the image, the question of a stylistic history of scientific imagery, and the role played by visual argumentation during the Scientific Revolution. Focusing primarily on images that fall outside of art proper, such as those used in the works of the philosophers Thomas Hobbes and Gottfried Wilhelm Leibniz and the scientists Charles Darwin and Galileo Galilei, Bredekamp argues that images inculcate a particular kind of understanding that could not be formed in their absence.

Bredekamp criticises the idea, associated with Sachs-Hombach, that Bildwissenschaft might be constructed by amassing the pre-existing insights of various disciplines, arguing that a new science cannot be straightforwardly established through the adding together of existing disciplines. Against Sachs-Hombach's argument that art history is one of many disciplines on which Bildwissenschaft should draw, and Belting's argument that art history is outdated or obsolescent, Bredekamp argues that (Austro-German) art history has always contained an incipiently universal orientation and a focus on non-art images.

=== Lambert Wiesing ===
The philosopher Lambert Wiesing shares with Bredekamp the belief that Bildwissenschaft's universalism is inherent in art history, but argues that Bildwissenschaft differentiates itself by virtue of its attention to images per se rather than specific images or groups of images. Wiesing distinguishes between Bildwissenschaft and Bildtheorie ("image theory"), arguing that, while the two are complementary, the former is concerned with specific, concrete images, whereas the latter seeks answers to the question of what an image is.
