= Rotterdam University =

Rotterdam University may refer to:

- Rotterdam University of Applied Sciences (NL)
- Erasmus University Rotterdam (NL)
