= Lambert Wiesing =

German philosopher

Lambert Wiesing is a German philosopher who specializes in phenomenology, perception and image theory, and aesthetics.

== Biography ==
Wiesing, brother of the medical ethicist Urban Wiesing, studied philosophy, art history and archaeology at the University of Münster, where he received his doctorate in 1989. In 1996, Wiesing habilitated in philosophy at the Technische Universität Chemnitz with the thesis "Die Sichtbarkeit des Bildes. Geschichte und Perspektiven der formalen Ästhetik".

Together with Birgit Recki and Karlheinz Lüdeking, Wiesing founded the German Society for Aesthetics in 1993, of which he was vice president from 1993 to 1999 and 2002 to 2006, and president from 2006 to 2009. Wiesing has held visiting professorships at the universities of Vienna, Oxford, and Dartmouth College in Hanover, New Hampshire. In 2001, he became professor of comparative image theory in the field of media studies at the Friedrich Schiller University in Jena, Germany, and in 2009 he was appointed chair of image theory and phenomenology in the Institute of Philosophy at the same university. In 2019, Wiesing was elected president of the German Society for Phenomenological Research. Together with Thomas Fuchs, who was elected vice president at the same time, he leads the society.

== Awards and prizes ==
- 2015 Science Award of the Aby Warburg Foundation
- 2018 Thuringian Research Prize in the field of basic research
- 2021 Marsilius Medal for the Promotion of Conversation between Scientific Cultures

== Books ==
- Stil statt Wahrheit. Kurt Schwitters und Ludwig Wittgenstein über ästhetische Lebensformen. München: Wilhelm Fink Verlag 1991. ISBN 978-3-7705-2704-5.
- Die Sichtbarkeit des Bildes. Geschichte und Perspektiven der formalen Ästhetik. Reinbek bei Hamburg: Rowohlt Taschenbuch Verlag 1997. ISBN 978-3-593-38636-2.
- Die Uhr: Eine semiotische Betrachtung. Saarbrücken: Verlag St. Johann 1998. ISBN 978-3-928596-33-6.
- Phänomene im Bild. München: Wilhelm Fink Verlag 2000. ISBN 978-3-7705-3532-3.
- Zusammen mit Gottfried Jäger: Abstrakte Fotografie. Denk- und Bildmöglichkeiten. Bielefeld: Verlag der Fachhochschule Bielefeld 2000.
- Artifizielle Präsenz: Studien zur Philosophie des Bildes. Frankfurt am Main: Suhrkamp 2005. ISBN 978-3-518-29337-9.
  - englisch: Artificial Presence. Philosophical Studies in Image Theory. Stanford: Stanford University Press 2010. ISBN 978-0-8047-5941-0.
  - polnisch: Sztuczna obecnosc. Studia z filozofii obrazu. Warschau: Oficyna Naukowa 2012. ISBN 978-83-7737-014-8.
- Die Sichtbarkeit des Bildes. Geschichte und Perspektiven der formalen Ästhetik. Frankfurt am Main; New York: Campus Verlag 2008. ISBN 978-3-593-38636-2.
  - französisch: La visibilité de límage. Histoire et perspectives de l'esthétique formelle. Paris: Vrin 2014. ISBN 978-2-7116-2598-7.
  - polnisch: Widzialność obrazu. Historia i perspektywy estetyki formalnej. Warschau: Oficyna Naukowa 2008. ISBN 978-83-7459-058-7.
  - English: The Visibility of the Image: history and perspectives of formal aesthetics. London; New York [u. a.]: Bloomsbury Publishing 2016. ISBN 978-1-4742-3264-7.
- Das Mich der Wahrnehmung: Eine Autopsie. Frankfurt am Main: Suhrkamp 2009.
  - English: The Philosophy of Perception. Phenomenology and Image Theory. London, New Delhi, New York und Sydney: Bloomsbury 2014. ISBN 978-1-78093-759-5.
  - italienisch: Il Me della percezione. Un’autopsia. Mailand: Marinotti Edizioni 2014. ISBN 978-88-8273-149-6.
- Zusammen mit Jens Balzer: Outcault. Die Erfindung des Comic. Bochum und Essen: Ch. Bachmann Verlag 2010. ISBN 978-3-941030-07-7.
- Sehen lassen. Die Praxis des Zeigens. Frankfurt am Main: Suhrkamp 2013. ISBN 978-3-518-29646-2.
- Luxus. Berlin: Suhrkamp 2015. ISBN 978-3-518-58627-3.
  - English: A philosophy of Luxury. London, New York: Routledge 2019. ISBN 978-0367138417.
- Das Mich der Wahrnehmung: Eine Autopsie. Frankfurt am Main: Suhrkamp 2015. ISBN 978-3-518-29771-1.
  - English: Philosophy of perception. Phenomenology and image theory. London : Bloomsbury Academic 2016. ISBN 978-1-4742-7532-3.
- Ich für mich. Phänomenologie des Selbstbewusstseins. Berlin: Suhrkamp 2020. ISBN 978-3-518-29914-2.
