= Nick Wilding =

British-born American historian

Nick Wilding is a British-born American historian. He became internationally known after exposing as a forgery a copy of Galileo's “Sidereus Nuncius” that purportedly included Galileo's own watercolors of the moon.

== Life ==
Wilding studied English at New College, Oxford. After his B. A. with highest honors in 1992 he made in 1993 at the University of Warwick his Masters with a thesis on Renaissance. Subsequently, he conducted research at the European University Institute and in 2000 he received his doctorate for PhD with a dissertation on natural philosophy and communication in early modern Europe.

He carried out postdoctoral research at Stanford University, and from 2002 to 2005 at University of Cambridge. 2005/2006 Wilding was at Columbia University, 2006/2007 at University of Miami, and since 2007 as Assistant (now Full) Professor at Georgia State University.

In 2012 Wilding was able to prove on the basis of forensic evidence that a special edition of Sidereus Nuncius of Galileo Galilei consisting of unknown ink drawings which was found in 2005 and designated as authentic was a fake that had been created by the Italian antiquarian and library thief Marino Massimo De Caro, former director of the Girolamini Library, Naples, Italy, and introduced into the U.S. antique book trade.

Now, people regard him as an expert in spotting a forgery, and many looking to buy or sell rare and/or antiquated books come to him to have him authenticate the texts:
