= Hans Belting =

German art historian (1935–2023)

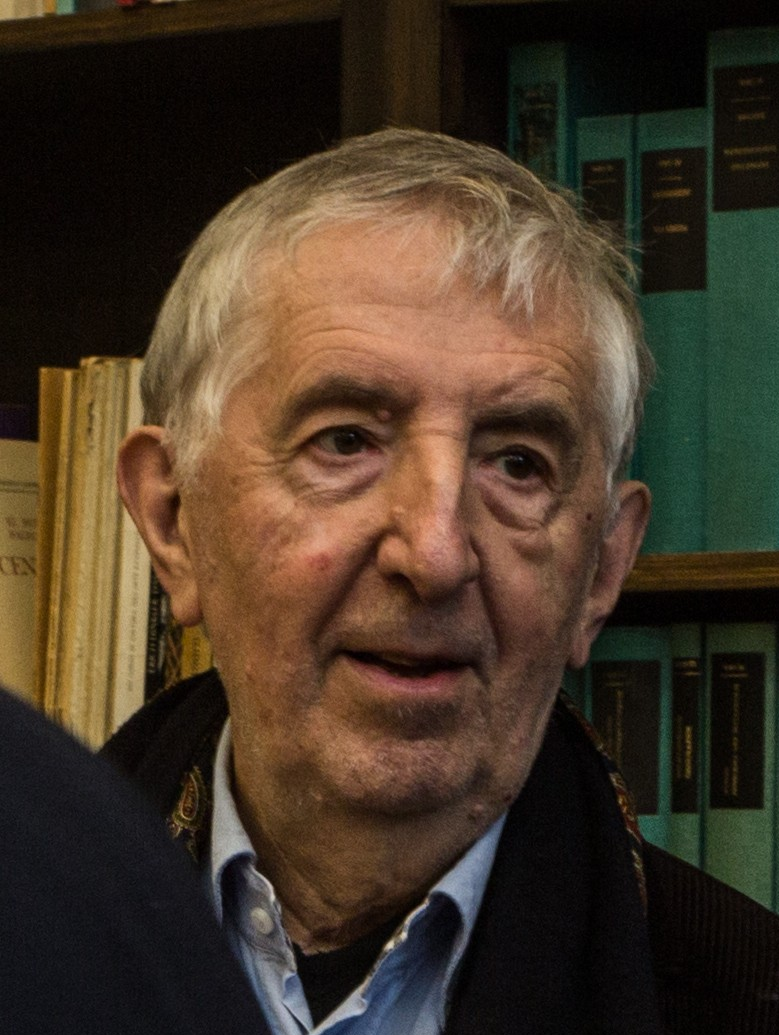
- Belting in 2016
- Born: 7 July 1935; Andernach, Gau Koblenz-Trier, German Reich
- Died: 10 January 2023 (aged 87); Berlin, Germany
- Education: University of Mainz
- Occupation: Art historian

Hans Belting (7 July 1935 – 10 January 2023) was a German art historian and media theorist with a focus on image science, and this with regard to contemporary art and to the Italian art of the Middle Ages and the Renaissance.

== Biography ==
Belting was born in Andernach, Rhine Province, on 7 July 1935. He studied at the universities of Mainz and Rome, and took his doctorate in art history at the University of Mainz. Belting taught as a professor of art history at the University of Hamburg in 1966, then at Heidelberg University, and from 1980 to 1992 at LMU Munich.

From 1992 until his retirement in 2002, Belting was professor at the Institute for Art History and Media Theory at the State College of Design in Karlsruhe. From October 2004 until the end of September 2007, Belting served as Director of the Internationales Forschungszentrum Kulturwissenschaften (International Research Centre for Cultural Studies) in Vienna.

Belting published his first monograph in 1962 (Die Basilica dei Ss. Martiri in Cimitile) and later authored more than thirty books, some of them translated into various languages. His essay "The End of Art History?" attracted considerable attention and Belting expanded it in successive editions.

Belting died in Berlin on 10 January 2023, at age 87.

== Writings ==
Belting was known for his contributions to the field of Bildwissenschaft ("image-science"). His account of Bildwissenschaft sought to develop an anthropological theory of the image to examine its universal functions that span cultural distinctions, and considered the relationship between the image and the body. Belting examined images used in religious contexts to identify the original non-artistic functions of images today considered art objects, and argued that "art" was a unit of analysis had emerged in the 16th century that obstructed corporeal engagements with images.

In Likeness and Presence (1990), Belting argued for the necessity of understanding the ways images give meaning to their contexts, rather than gaining meaning from their contexts, to understand images as actors with their own agency. Belting argued that art history as a disciplinary formation was outmoded and potentially obsolete, and that a Bildwissenschaft capable of apprehending all kinds of images, the exact scope and methods of which remain uncertain, should be sought. Pioneering the development of a global perspective on art studies and museum practice was the research project GAM – Global Art and the Museum, which Belting initiated in 2006 with Peter Weibel and Andrea Buddensieg at the ZKM Center for Art and Media Karlsruhe. The project, which ran until 2016, took a look at new museum practices and the worldwide development of art biennials that have emerged beyond "Euramerica" (John Clark) since the end of the 1980s. The project included the exhibition and publication The Global Contemporary: Art Worlds after 1989 (2011–2012) at ZKM | Center or Art and Media Karlsruhe.

== Fellowships and honours ==
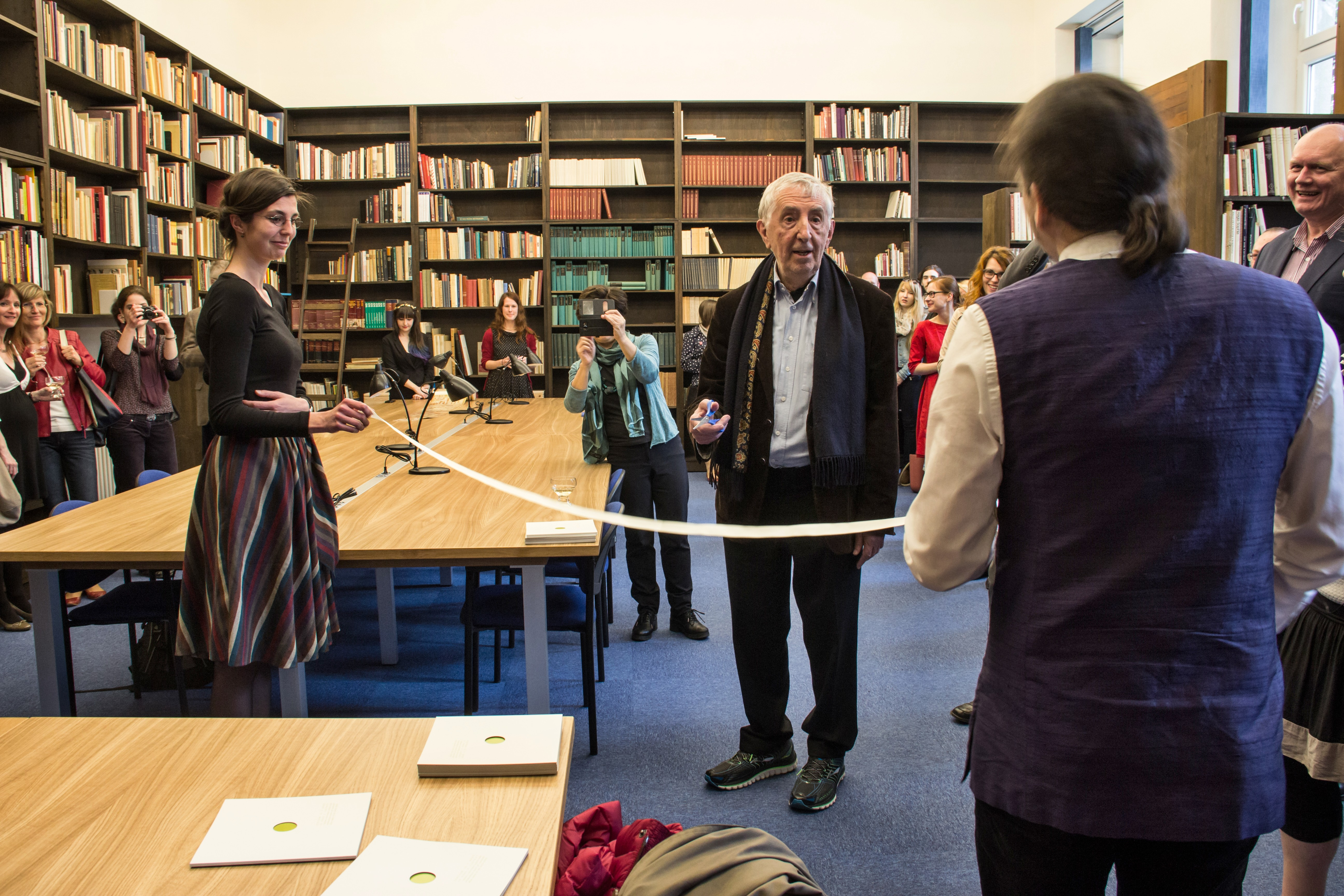
Belting opening library with his books in Masaryk University, Brno

Belting was a member of scientific academies in Germany and the U.S., including the Heidelberg Academy of Sciences and Humanities, a fellow of the Berlin Institute for Advanced Study, and honorary member of the Leibniz-Zentrum für Literatur- und Kulturforschung, Berlin. He was a member of the Order Pour le Mérite for Sciences and Arts and a member of the Board of Trustees of the Museum of Modern Art Ludwig Foundation Vienna (MUMOK). He was elected a Foreign Honorary Member of the American Academy of Arts and Sciences in 1992, and a member of the American Philosophical Society in 2005. He held a fellowship at Dumbarton Oaks of Harvard University in Washington, D.C.

In 2016 Belting donated his private library in three parts to the libraries of the institutes of art history at Free University of Berlin, at Danube University Krems (Austria) as well as the Department of Art History of the Faculty of Arts of Masaryk University. Hence the last named the new library after him.

== Works ==
- Belting, Hans (2017). Face and Mask: A Double History. Princeton: Princeton University Press. ISBN 978-0691162355.
- —— (2013). Faces eine Geschichte des Gesichts (in German). München. ISBN 978-3-406-64430-6. OCLC 812376930.
- —— (2011). Florence and Baghdad: Renaissance art and Arab science. Cambridge, Mass.: Belknap Press of Harvard University Press. ISBN 978-0-674-05004-4. OCLC 701493612.
- ——; Dunlap, Thomas (2011). An Anthropology of Images: Picture, Medium, Body. Princeton: Princeton University Press. ISBN 978-0-691-14500-6. OCLC 691205559.
- —— (2009). Looking through Duchamp's door: art and perspective in the work of Duchamp, Sugimoto, Jeff Wall. Köln: Verlag der Buchhandlung Walther König. ISBN 978-3-86560-605-1. OCLC 499093764.
- ——; Buddensieg, Andrea; Araújo, Emanoel; Global Art and the Museum; Internationales Forschungszentrum Kulturwissenschaften; Zentrum für Kunst und Medientechnologie Karlsruhe (2009). The global art world: audiences, markets, and museums. Ostfildern: Hatje Cantz. ISBN 978-3-7757-2407-4. OCLC 427296651.
- ——; Birken, Jacob; Buddensieg, Andrea; Weibel, Peter; Binter, Julia T. S. (2011). Global studies: mapping contemporary art and culture. Ostfildern, Germany: Hatje Cantz. ISBN 978-3-7757-3202-4. OCLC 767534541.
- ——; Bosch, Hieronymus (2012). Hieronymus Bosch, Garden of earthly delights. Munich: Prestel. ISBN 978-3-7913-3320-5. OCLC 829228470.
- —— (2003). Art history after modernism. Chicago: University of Chicago Press. ISBN 0-226-04184-0. OCLC 48265530.
- —— (2001). The invisible masterpiece. Translated by Atkins, Helen. Chicago: University of Chicago Press. ISBN 0-226-04265-0. OCLC 46401602.
- —— (1998). The Germans and their art: a troublesome relationship. New Haven: Yale University Press. ISBN 0-300-07616-9. OCLC 38468736.
- ——; Jephcott, E. F. N. (1994). Likeness and presence: a history of the image before the era of art. Chicago: University of Chicago Press. ISBN 0-226-04214-6. OCLC 27769840.
- —— (1990). The image and its public in the Middle Ages: form and function of early paintings of the Passion. New Rochelle, N.Y.: A.D. Caratzas. ISBN 0-89241-403-0. OCLC 19623960.
- —— (1989). Max Beckmann: tradition as a problem in modern art. New York: Timken Publishers. ISBN 0-943221-06-4. OCLC 20261141.
- ——; Wood, Christopher S. (1987). The end of the history of art?. Chicago: University of Chicago Press. ISBN 0-226-04217-0. OCLC 14359049.

== Chapters ==
- Hans Belting, "The Migration of Images. An Encounter with Figuration in Islamic Art", in Dynamis of the Image. Moving Images in a Global World, eds. Emmanuel Alloa & Chiara Cappelletto, Berlin-New York: De Gruyter 2021, Series "Contact Zones", pp. 63-78, doi=10.1515/9783110530544-004
