= Max Imdahl =

German art historian

Max Imdahl (September 6, 1925 – October 11, 1988) was a German art historian specialized in art historical methodology and the interpretation of modern art after World War II. He was born in Aachen and died in Bochum.

== Life and work ==
Imdahl studied studio painting, art history, archaeology and German literature at the University of Münster. For his paintings he won the Blevins Davis Prize, the most prestigious art contest of the postwar period in Germany, in 1950. In 1951 he completed his Ph.D. dissertation on the treatment of color in late Carolingian book illustration under Werner Hager. He worked as an assistant professor at the University of Münster for some years and wrote his Habilitationsschrift on Ottonian Art in 1961. In 1965, he was appointed professor of art history at the newly founded Ruhr Universität Bochum, where he was engaged in promoting modern art and in advising the university's modern art collection. From 1986 until his death, he was also a member of the German Academy of Arts.

Imdahl formulated a methodology he called "the Iconic," using an artwork's structure to determine its significance. His color analyses are characteristic of his approach. Furthermore, he primarily focused on examinations of the work of individual painters. Marxist interpreters accused him of using analytical methods that lacked historical awareness. They also criticized his preference for concrete (object-free) Western Art. In contrast, he found support for his ideas among philosophers and Catholic theologians.

== Select publications ==
- Angeli Janhsen-Vukicevic, Gundolf Winter and Gottfried Boehm, eds., Max Imdahl: Gesammelte Schriften. 3 vols. Frankfurt am Main: Suhrkamp, 1996.
- Picassos Guernica. Frankfurt am Main: Insel, 1995.
- "Die Zeitstruktur in Poussins 'Mannalese'." In Clemens Fruh, Raphael Rosenberg and Hans-Peter Rosinski, eds., Kunstgeschichte, aber wie? Zehn Themen und Beispiele. Berlin: Reimer, 1989.
- Farbe: Kunsttheoretische Reflexionen in Frankreich. Munich: W. Fink, 1987.
- Giotto: Arenafresken: Ikonographie, Ikonologie, Ikonik. Munich: W. Fink, 1980.
- (with Gustav Vriesen), Robert Delaunay: Light and Color. New York: H. N. Abrams, 1969.
- (with Werner Hager and Günther Fiensch), Studien zur Kunstform. Munster: Böhlau, 1955.
