= Martin Marsh =

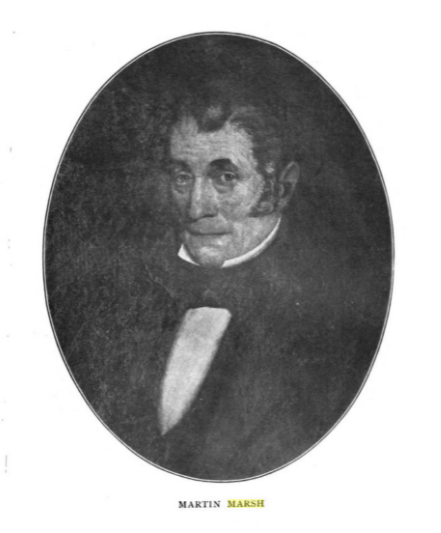
Martin Marsh

Martin Marsh (1777-July 26, 1865) was a mason, tavern keeper, and businessman from Dedham, Massachusetts. He built 19 Court Street in Dedham.

== Personal life ==
Marsh was born in Hingham, Massachusetts in 1777 and moved to Dedham as a young adult. He joined the First Church and Parish in Dedham and became a deacon there. He was responsible for managing the church's finances.

Marsh was a large landowner in Dedham. He was married for nearly 66 years at the time of his death. Marsh had a son, Henry. He was a Freemason and a charter member of the Society in Dedham for Apprehending Horse Thieves, which was formed at his tavern.

He died in Dedham July 26, 1865. Marsh Street in Dedham was named for him.

== Public life ==
Marsh was described as "public spirited [and] at all times ready to aid in whatever might contribute to the improvement of society." For 36 years, he was chairman of the Board of Overseers of the House of Correction. He was also a selectman in Dedham for several terms.

He was connected with the Fire Department in 1802 and was a candidate for a seat in the United States House of Representatives in 1844.

== Career ==
Marsh was a mason by trade. By 1803, he was successful enough to advertise for an apprentice.

Marsh was repeatedly reëlected as a Director and Treasurer of the Norfolk Insurance Company and was "a watchful guardian of the interests" of the Dedham Institution for Savings.

=== Norfolk House ===
During the first few years of the 19th century, several turnpikes, including those linking Boston and Providence and Dedham and Hartford, were laid through Dedham. Inns and taverns sprung up along the new roads as more than 600 coaches would pass through Dedham each day on their way to Boston or Providence. As many as 40 coaches passed through town every day, and Dedham was the first stop on the way to Providence, or the last stop on the way to Boston.

In 1802, Marsh built his brick home at what is today 19 Court Street and was then right on one of the new turnpikes. He obtained a 999-year lease from First Church for the land on June 15, 1801, for $30 a year. (Note: Deacons Joseph Whiting, Aaron Fuller, and Isaac Bullard leased the land on behalf of the church.) Marsh leased an adjoining parcel from the church on similar terms in 1809.

He saw the traffic flowing daily past his house and quickly turned his home into a tavern. His establishment, the Norfolk House, like the other inns and taverns in Dedham at that time, were bustling with the arrival of both the turnpikes and the courts. The tavern was affiliated with the Tremont Stagecoach Line. It had a fierce competition with the Phoenix Hotel's (Note: Located at the present day site of the Knights of Columbus building at the intersection on Washington and High Streets.) Citizen Stagecoach Line. (Note: All of the coaches for the Citizen Stagecoach Line were built in Dedham as well.)

Though he wanted to sell it as early as 1814, Marsh maintained the tavern until 1818, and then sold it to Moses Gray and Francis Alden.

== Works cited ==
- Hanson, Robert Brand (1976). Dedham, Massachusetts, 1635-1890. Dedham Historical Society.
- Austin, Walter (1912). Tale of a Dedham Tavern: History of the Norfolk Hotel, Dedham, Massachusetts. Priv. print. at the Riverside Press.
