= Gay's Tavern =

Tavern in Dedham, Massachusetts

Coordinates: 42°14′54.5″N 71°10′24.5″W

Gay's Tavern was a tavern in Dedham, Massachusetts. The original location was a political hotspot and the host of a political convention in 1780, while the second location (at today's 369 Washington Street) would become known by many names, including the Phoenix Hotel.

== Original location ==
The Tavern was originally located on Court Street across Highland Street from the Dedham Inn. The original proprietor in 1749 was Benjamin Gay, who built it into an establishment as nice or nicer than any other in the area. Benjamin and Nathaniel Ames of the Ames Tavern had a rivalry, with Ames once writing in the Ames Almanack that people should not believe the rumors Benjamin was spreading about his establishment. Slightly north of Gay's Tavern, at the intersection of Court and Church Street, was Howe's Tavern.

In those days, stagecoaches would stop at the various taverns along the route for a change of horses or refreshments. In the early days, as many as 20 stagecoaches a day would pass by the house, with many stopping at Gay's Tavern. The arrival of the coach was always a lively one at Gay's Tavern. The townsmen eager for the latest news would drop in and mingle with the new arrivals around the comfortable fire in the great room. Here the assembled company would discuss all manner of subjects, with politics usually being the chief topic.

After Benjamin died in 1761, his widow ran the Tavern. Following her death, her son Joshua Gay ran the Tavern. (Note: Joshua built a colonial house that was occupied by Hugh Perrin in 1936.) Joshua kept the Tavern for more than 25 years until his death, at which point Timothy Gay of Needham became the owner and proprietor. The Tavern was a sort of political headquarters for years during this era.

Shortly after the Constitution of Massachusetts was adopted on October 25, 1780, a number of towns in Suffolk County, of which Dedham was a part, elected delegates to a convention to decide upon some policy relative to the division of the county. The convention met at Gay's Tavern on December 12, 1780, and adopted a resolution to the effect that the towns of Bellingham, Dedham, Foxborough, Franklin, Medfield, Medway, Needham, Stoughton, Stoughtonham, Walpole, and Wrentham, along with the Middlesex County towns of Holliston, Hopkinton, Natick, and Sherborn ought to be formed into a new county with Medfield as the shiretown. The Great and General Court did not look favorably upon the resolution, however, and Norfolk County was not created until 1793, with Dedham as the shiretown.

Following the creation of Norfolk County, Gay's Tavern was the site of a Court of General Sessions on August 25, 1794. They ordered that the committee on buildings proceed with collecting materials for building a jail. On the last day of September following this order, the court accepted from Timothy Gay (Note: Timothy Gay Jr. was the jail keeper and was indicted, but acquitted, in the escape of Jason Fairbanks.) the gift of a parallelogram lot of land to erect the Norfolk County Jail next to his tavern.

== Second location ==
When the Norfolk and Bristol Turnpike was opened in 1803, Gay leased a tavern directly on the new road where it met High Street, where 369 Washington Street stands today. His tavern was one of many that sprouted up to serve the more than 600 coaches that would pass through Dedham each day on their way to Boston or Providence.

Gay was also the owner of the Citizen Stagecoach Line and, due to this, all of the stagecoaches traveling between Providence and Boston stopped at his tavern. (Note: All of the coaches for the Citizen Stagecoach Line were built in Dedham as well.) Gay paid $5,000 a year to use the turnpike, and was able to get a coach from one city to the other in just under three and a half hours. The stable behind Gay's Tavern could hold over 100 horses and eight horse teams could be switched within two minutes.

== Later owners ==
Timothy Gay left the Tavern by 1810, but it was then operated by a number of others, some of whom gave the business their own name, including Calp, Smith, Polley, Alden, and Bride. Despite this, it was still commonly known as Gay's Tavern.

An advertisement appeared on March 24, 1807, announcing that Stephen Fuller, the current tavern keeper, would be selling the tavern. Possession would transfer on June 10. In 1821, Alden left the Norfolk House to run Gay's Tavern. In 1828, he purchased the Norfolk House and returned there.

John Bride was proprietor by 1832 and it was an attractive hotel that could handle the relay of horses and the needs of the many passengers who passed through each day. The 12 to 15 coaches that pulled up each day typically had seven or more people in each. The stable housed over 100 horses at any given time. Teams of eight horses could be swapped out in two minutes.

The Tavern and several of the adjoining buildings were destroyed by fire on October 30, 1832. About sixty horses belonging to the Citizens Stage Company perished in the fire. The tavern was rebuilt and the new building was named the Phoenix House.

It was opened in 1834 with James Bride as the landlord and soon came to be widely known as Bride's Tavern. At the time it was completed it was the finest hotel in Norfolk County and in its appointments rivaled some of the leading hotels of Boston. Under different names and different managers, the house continued to do a good business until it was again burned to the ground on the morning of December 25, 1880. Among the distinguished guests of this hotel were President Andrew Jackson and President James Monroe.

Annual and special meetings of the Society in Dedham for Apprehending Horse Thieves were held at the hotel after 1849.

== Works cited ==
- Austin, Walter (1912). Tale of a Dedham Tavern: History of the Norfolk Hotel, Dedham, Massachusetts. Priv. print. at the Riverside Press.
- Cook, Louis Atwood (1918). History of Norfolk County, Massachusetts, 1622-1918. S.J. Clarke publishing Company.
- Hanson, Robert Brand (1976). Dedham, Massachusetts, 1635-1890. Dedham Historical Society.
- Hurd, Duane Hamilton (1884). History of Norfolk County, Massachusetts: With Biographical Sketches of Many of Its Pioneers and Prominent Men. J. W. Lewis & Company.
- Parr, James L. (2009). Dedham: Historic and Heroic Tales From Shiretown. The History Press. ISBN 978-1-59629-750-0.
- De Lue, Willard (1925). The Story of Walpole, 1724-1924: A Narrative History. Ambrose Press.
