= Anti-Horse Thief Association =

Vigilance committee formed to provide protection against marauders

The Anti Horse Thief Association was a vigilance committee, organized at Fort Scott, Kansas, in 1859 to provide protection against marauders thriving on border warfare. It resembled other vigilance societies in organization and methods, although it did not share some of the shadier tactics of other vigilance committees and members of the Regulators. It achieved great success in apprehending offenders over a wide area. Though it initially focused on horse theft, it diversified into other areas while still retaining the original name.

== See also ==
- Bentonville Anti-Horse Thief Society
- The Society in Dedham for Apprehending Horse Thieves
- Stolen Horse International
