= 601–603 High Street =

Building in Massachusetts

Coordinates: 42°14′54.61″N 71°10′25.94″W

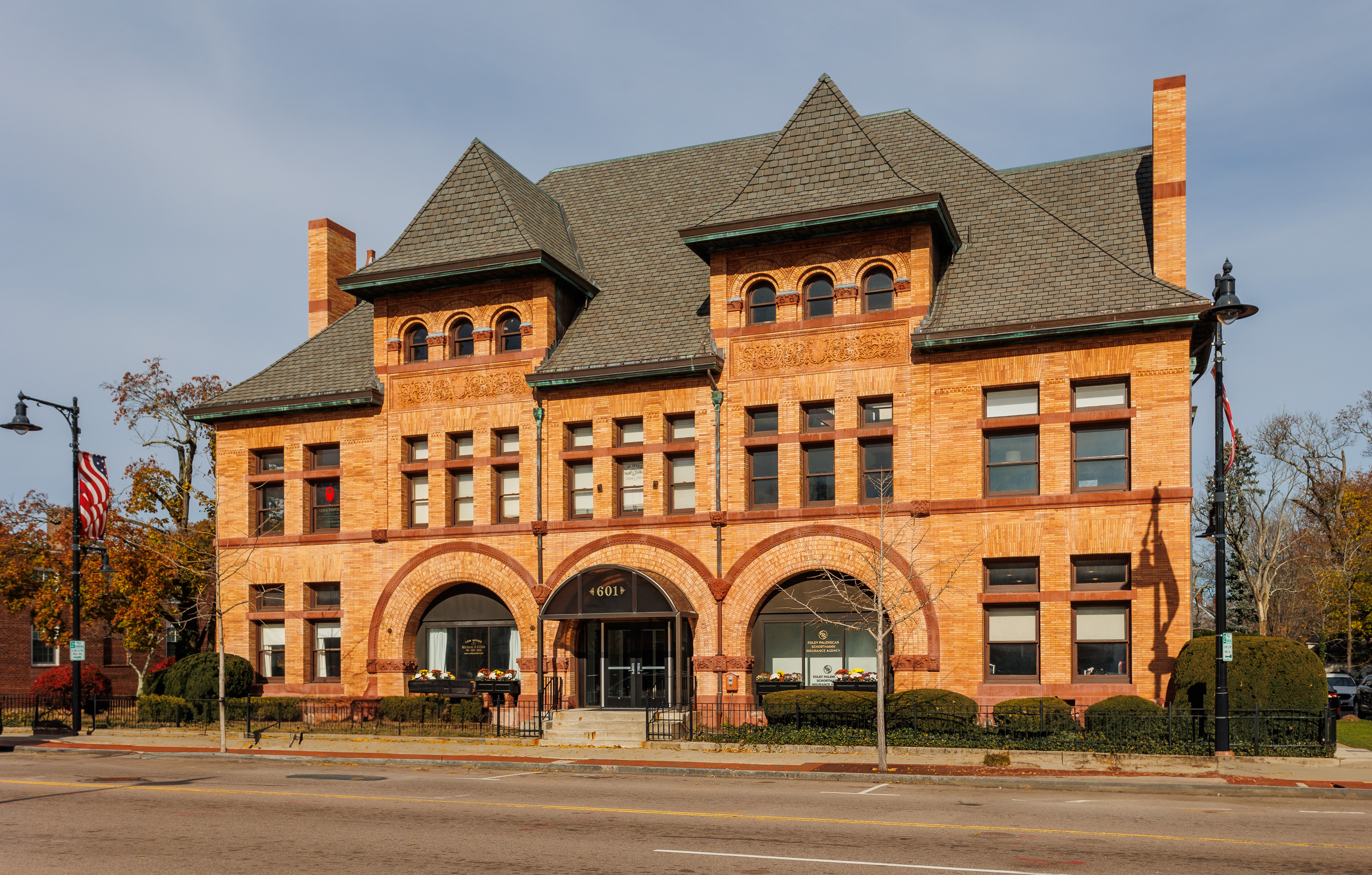
601-603 High Street

601-603 High Street is a historic Romanesque Revival - Richardsonian Romanesque building in Dedham Square, Massachusetts. Both the 1996 and 2009 master plans of the Town of Dedham have recognized the building as having historic, aesthetic, and economic importance.

== History ==
The land was acquired in 1819 by George Dixon and he built a home there. In the ell of the house was an apothecary shop that sold products produced by Dedham's Wheaton & Dixon.

By the 1880s, the Dedham Institution for Savings, which had been housed for 40 years in the Norfolk Mutual Fire Insurance Company at 4 Pearl Street, determined that they needed additional space and a building of their own. On April 26, 1887, the bank purchased the Phoenix Estate on the corner of High and Washington Streets, the site of the present day Knights of Columbus building, next to the Dixon property. On August 13, 1887, a committee was formed (Note: The 1887 committee was composed of John R. Bullard, Alfred Hewins, and Joseph A. Laforme.) to look into the cost of erecting a building on the site.

On February 27, 1890, however, the property was sold and a new committee (Note: The 1890 committee was composed of Winslow Warren, Stephen M. Weld, and Alfred Hewins.) was appointed to sell this property and to purchase the Marsh lot next door. The new property was purchased on March 18, 1890. On February 14, 1891, plans and cost estimates for a new building were accepted by the bank trustees and construction commenced. On August 22, 1892, the bank moved into their new quarters in the west end of the building.

When first opened, the lower level housed the Dedham National Bank and William Hurley's drug store in addition to the Dedham Institution for Savings. The second story housed the newly organized Fisher Ames Club, a men's social club. At the time of its opening, the local newspaper reported that people were lining up at the counter of the bank before the operation had moved down the street. The janitor had to tell them they were not open for business yet. A month later, the same paper reported that "the new bank building is a beehive of industry... The building is fitted throughout with the best of furniture and contains every modern convenience."

Dedham Savings sold the building on October 22, 1985, although they kept a branch office located in the building until they moved to the other side of Dedham Square in 2007. Since that time, the building has come to be known as the Schortman Insurance Building after its new owner. The building was sold in the summer of 2019 to Mark R. Epker, a resident of Dedham and the principal of Vantage Real Estate.

== Construction ==
The building was designed by Hartwell & Richardson and built by Darling Brothers of Worcester in the Romanesque Revival style. It was constructed with "old gold fire flashed", or roman, brick with brownstone trimmings. There are three dramatic arches facing the street, one for each of the three principal tenants at the street level. One was Dedham Savings, the second was Dedham National Bank, and the third was a druggist. The ends of the arches and the braces of the downspouts are accentuated by whimsical brownstone carvings, including entwined dolphins. Along the cornice line are large cast panels of foliate ornament. Above the center arch, in the copper downspout header boxes, the year "1892" is impressed. It also features high pitched roofs and steep dormers.

Since its construction, the building has been remodeled. The two side arches were originally entrances to the two banks and the center arch was a window, but today the center arch is a main entrance to the building and the side arches are windows. The bank is now a lawyer's office, although the vault remains. Within many of the offices the original oak paneling and fireplaces remain.

== Works cited ==
- Hill, Don Gleason (1892). "The Dedham Institution for Savings". Dedham Historical Register. 3 (4 ed.). Dedham Historical Society: 145–152.
- Town of Dedham Master Plan. Town of Dedham. April 2009.
