= 19 Court Street =

Norfolk House
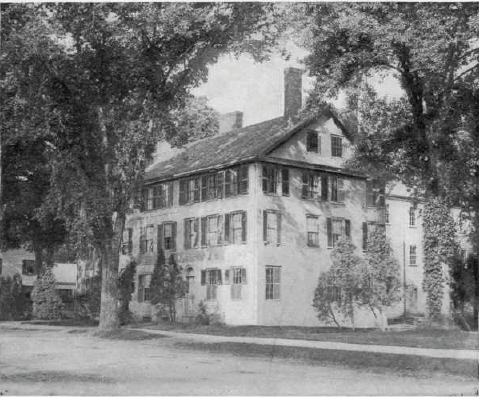
- 19 Court St. at the turn of the 20th Century
- Interactive map of the Norfolk House area

General information
- Architectural style: Federal
- Location: 19 Court Street, Dedham, Massachusetts
- Coordinates: 42.2485°N 71.1772°W
- Construction started: 1802
- Completed: 2017

19 Court Street is an historic building in Dedham, Massachusetts that was originally built in 1801 as a two-story, Federal-style single-family home. It was soon thereafter converted into a tavern, and hosted John Quincy Adams, Andrew Jackson, and the Marquis de Lafayette. In the 2010s it was converted into apartments. It has more than 15,000 square feet of living space.

== Norfolk House ==
During the first few years of the 19th century, several turnpikes, including those linking Boston and Providence and Dedham and Hartford, were laid through Dedham. Inns and taverns sprung up along the new roads as more than 600 coaches would pass through Dedham each day on their way to Boston or Providence. As many as 40 coaches passed through town every day, and Dedham was the first stop on the way to Providence, or the last stop on the way to Boston.

In 1802, Martin Marsh, a local mason, built his brick home at what is today 19 Court Street and was then right on one of the new turnpikes. He saw the traffic flowing daily past his house and quickly turned his home into the Norfolk House. His establishment, like the other inns and taverns in Dedham at that time, were bustling with the arrival of both the turnpikes and the courts.

The original portico of the house was the site of the first recorded traffic accident in Dedham. A runaway carriage crashed into the corner post and broke it. The Norfolk House was also the site where "on June 4, 1810, in an expression of public outrage, a number of Dedham citizens assembled" and founded the Society in Dedham for Apprehending Horse Thieves. Today the "Society is the oldest continually existing horse thief apprehending organization in the United States, and one of Dedham's most venerable social organizations."

Marsh maintained the tavern until 1818, and then sold it to Moses Gray and Francis Alden. It was this partnership that hosted President Andrew Jackson for lunch as he and his entourage passed through town in 1832.

In 1840, Martin Bates purchased the property. He sometimes kept a moose behind the property, and charged admission to see it.

== St. Mary's School and Asylum ==
Bates tried to sell the building to the Town of Dedham, but the Town was not interested. In a fit of spite, Bates then sold it to the Sisters of Charity for $1 to open St. Mary's School and Asylum, an orphanage and school for girls. The school closed in 1879, and then became a flop house, warehouse, and "third rate office building" which, at one point, housed the offices of an "independent clairvoyant and medical reformer." During this time the building fell into disrepair.

== Recent history ==
In 1902, Walter Austin, a wealthy pineapple merchant, purchased the home and restored it as a private residence with Frank Chouteau Brown as his architect. It was he who tore down the low portico with a dozen columns under the second story windows and added the larger one in the southern style. Austin also added an additional bay to the house with a covered porch, and an arcade was added to the ell in the rear of the house. Austin would go on to write a book about the history of the house.

It remained a single family home until early the 21st century, but it was only sporadically occupied. From 2000 on, the house sat vacant, for sale but in need of significant repairs. Town Meeting created a new class of zoning, and voted to place the Norfolk House into that zone, allowing for the property to be redeveloped with six apartments that will eventually be sold as condominiums.

In 2017, the Massachusetts Historical Commission awarded the house Historic Preservation Award. The rehabilitation project by Oxbow Partners (Note: The restoration team also included Needham Bank as Construction Lender, Horne + Johnson as the Architect of Record, Stack + Co. as the General Contractor, DeVellis Zrein Inc. as the Civil Engineer & Landscape Architect, Amory Architects as the Consulting Architect, and Tremont Preservation as the Historic Consultant.) used

state and federal tax credits focused on retaining important and distinctive historic features while transforming the single-family house into six apartments, meeting the needs of the current neighborhood. The exterior entryways and windows underwent extensive rehabilitation. Work included repairing the two east entry doors, installing a patio in the footprint of a non-extant front porch, and rehabilitating the south entryway into the main entrance. The historic wood windows were repaired and reinstalled, as were historic paneled and louvered shutters. In order to meet code requirements, a new egress was tucked into the northern elbow between the main block and the ell, and a clapboard vestibule was added to allow for rear egress from the main house and basement. When the project began, the interior retained much of the ornamental detail from the 1905 rehabilitation; the features restored in the new apartment units included historic wood trim, surrounds, fireplaces, doors, door hardware, and a domed ceiling.

During the construction, a fire broke out in the attic but was quickly brought under control and put out.

== Works cited ==
- Hanson, Robert Brand (1976). Dedham, Massachusetts, 1635-1890. Dedham Historical Society.
- Parr, James L. (2009). Dedham: Historic and Heroic Tales From Shiretown. The History Press. ISBN 978-1-59629-750-0.
