= Horse theft =

Crime of stealing horses

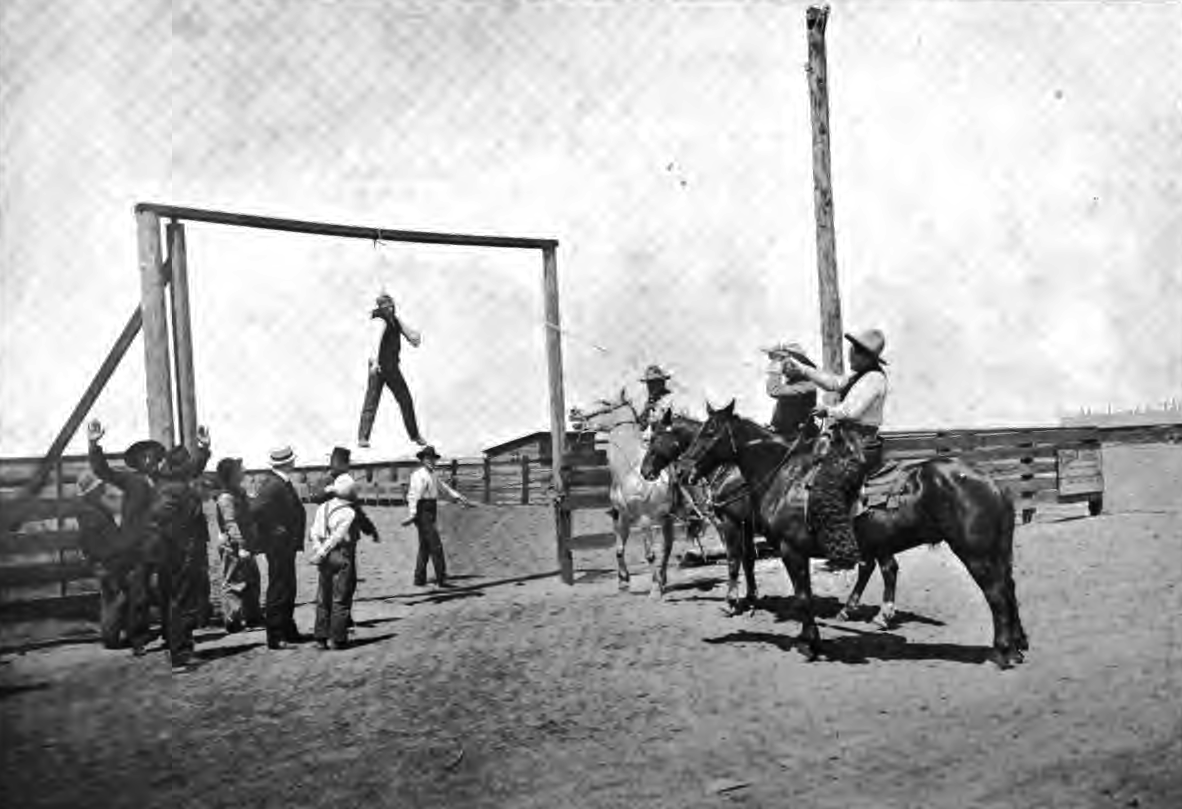
Oregon cowboys c. 1900 in a dramatization of the fate of a horse thief

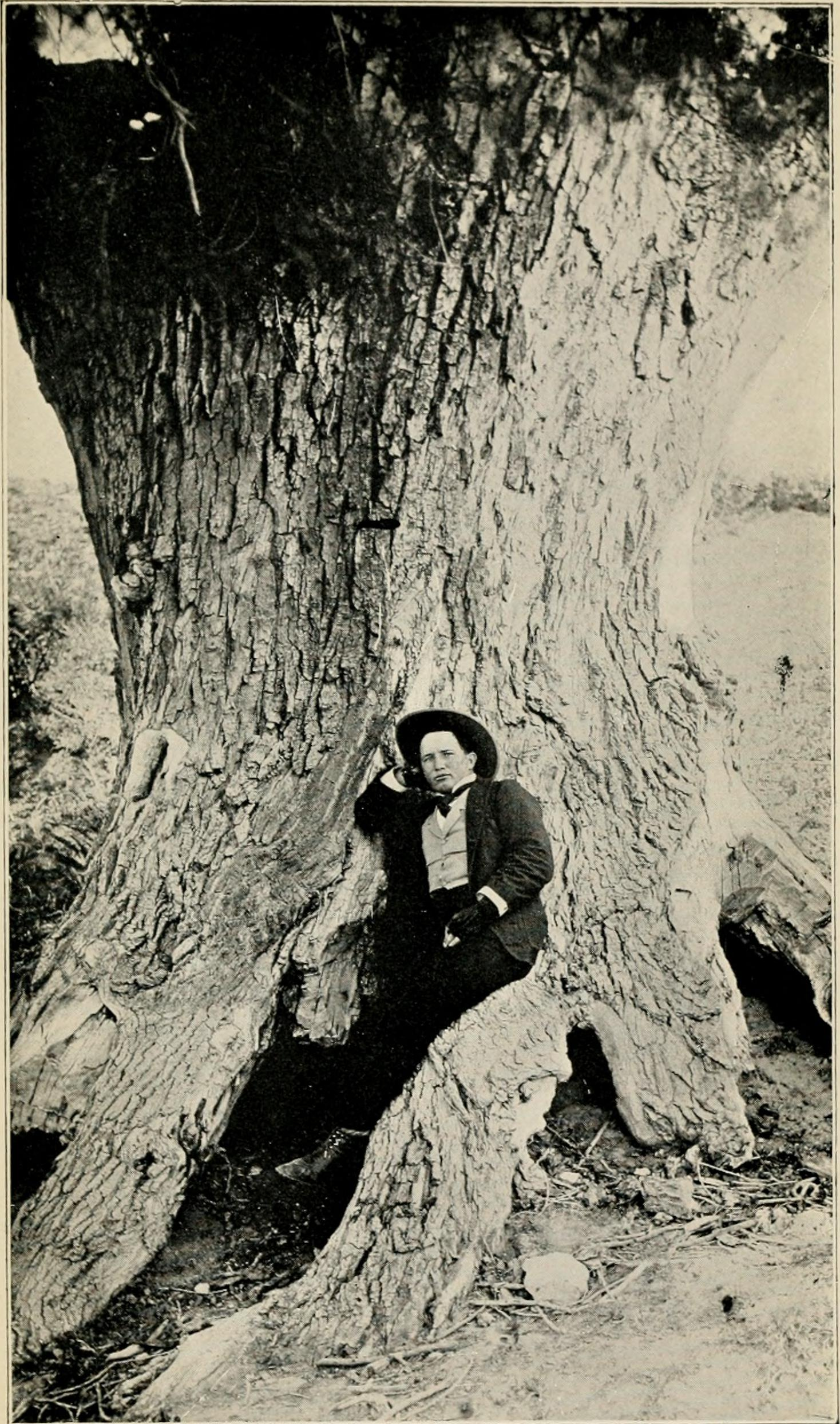
1913 photo of a tree in Horse Thief Canyon where a number of horse thieves were hanged

Horse theft is the crime of stealing horses. A person engaged in stealing horses is known as a horse thief. Historically, punishments were often severe for horse theft, with several cultures pronouncing the sentence of death upon actual or presumed thieves. Several societies were formed in the United States to prevent horse theft and apprehend horse thieves. However, horse theft continues to occur throughout the world as horses are stolen for their meat, for ransom, or in disputes between their owners and other persons. Before the invention of the automobile, horses were considered essential as there were few ways to call for help and travel long-distance.

Horse theft today is comparable to automobile theft, a crime punishable by felony jail time in most countries.

== History ==
=== Europe ===
Horse theft was a well-known crime in medieval and early modern times and was severely prosecuted in many areas. While many crimes were punished through ritualized shaming or banishment, horse theft often brought severe punishment, including branding, torture, exile and even death. According to one 18th century treatise, the use of death as a punishment for horse theft stretches back as far as the first century AD, when the Germanic Chauci tribe would sentence horse thieves to death, while murderers would be sentenced to a fine. This practice derived from the wealth of the populace being in the form of livestock which ranged over large areas, meaning that the theft of animals could only be prevented through fear of the harsh punishment that would result.

Horse theft was harshly punished in the French Bordeaux region in the 15th–18th centuries. Punishments ranged from whipping to a lifetime sentence of service on a galley ship, a severe punishment shared by perpetrators of incest, homicide and poisoning.

In 19th-century Russia, the theft of livestock (including horses) made up approximately 16 percent of thefts of peasant property; however, there were no reported thefts of horses from estate property. The offense of stealing a horse was the most severely punished of any theft on Russian estates, due to the importance of horses in day-to-day living. Flogging was the usual punishment for horse thieves, combined with the shaving of heads and beards, and fines of up to three times the value of the horse if the animal had been sold.

Since Henry VIII's reign, horse theft was considered a serious crime in England. It was made a non-clergyable crime in 1597–1598 and 1601. For the rural English county of Berkshire in the 18th century, horse theft was considered a major property crime, along with stealing from dwellings or warehouses, sheep theft, highway robbery and other major thefts. In Essex in the 18th century, some assize judges decided to execute every horse thief convicted to deter the crime. From around the 1750s until 1818, between 13% and 14% of persons convicted of horse theft in Home, Norfolk, and Western circuits were executed. The punishment of death for stealing horses was abolished in the United Kingdom in 1832, upon the passage of a bill sponsored by William Ewart; the legislation, which passed over the strong objections of Peel in the Commons and Lord Wynford in the Lords, also abolished the death penalty in Britain for the theft of sheep and cattle, and for larceny in a dwelling house; Parliament had abolished the death sentence for most larcenies in a separate bill the same year. By the time of its abolition, actual executions for horse theft had been rare for 50 years.

=== United States ===
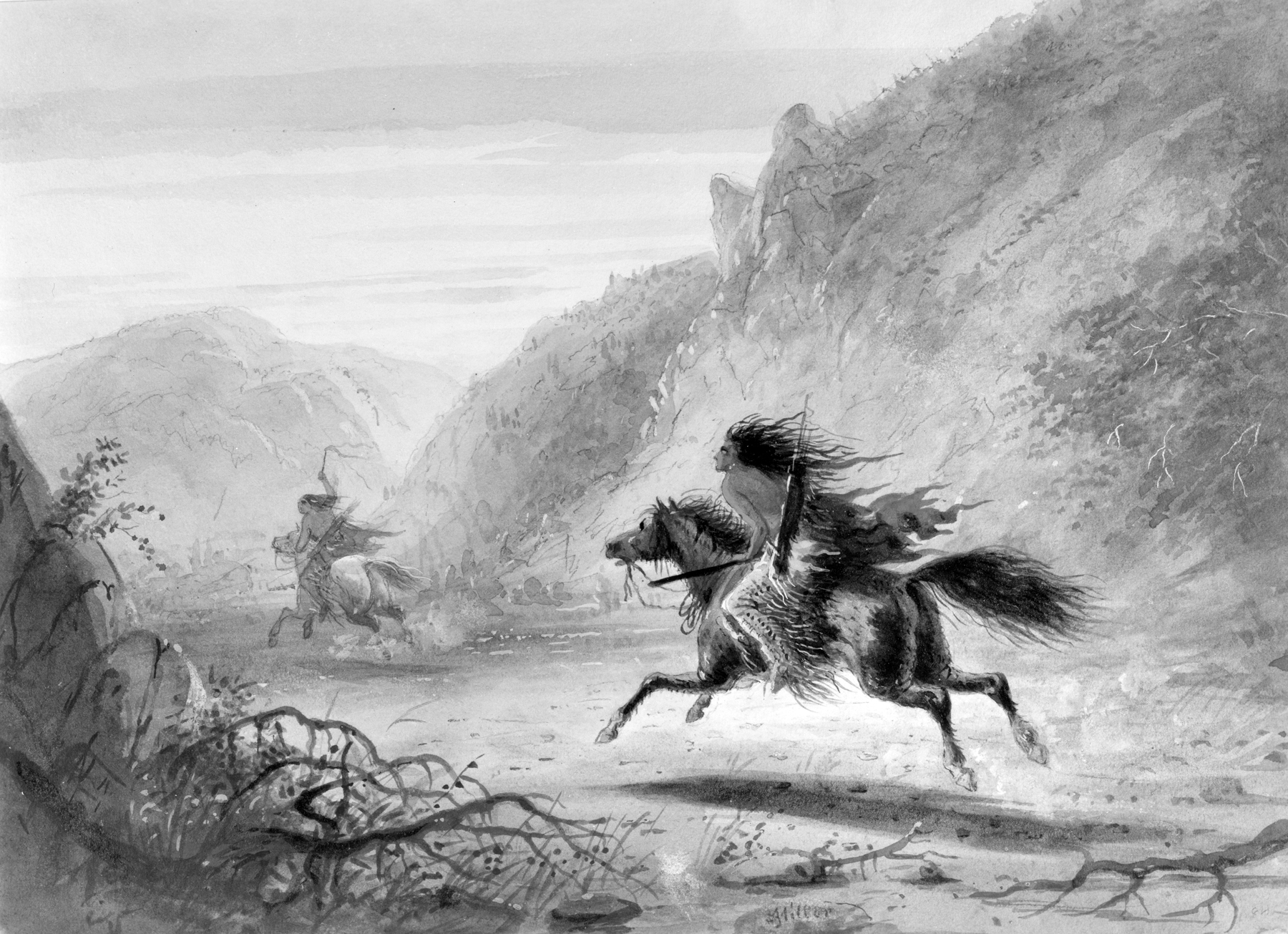
Alfred Jacob Miller's Snake Indian Pursuing "Crow" Horse Thief, c. 1859

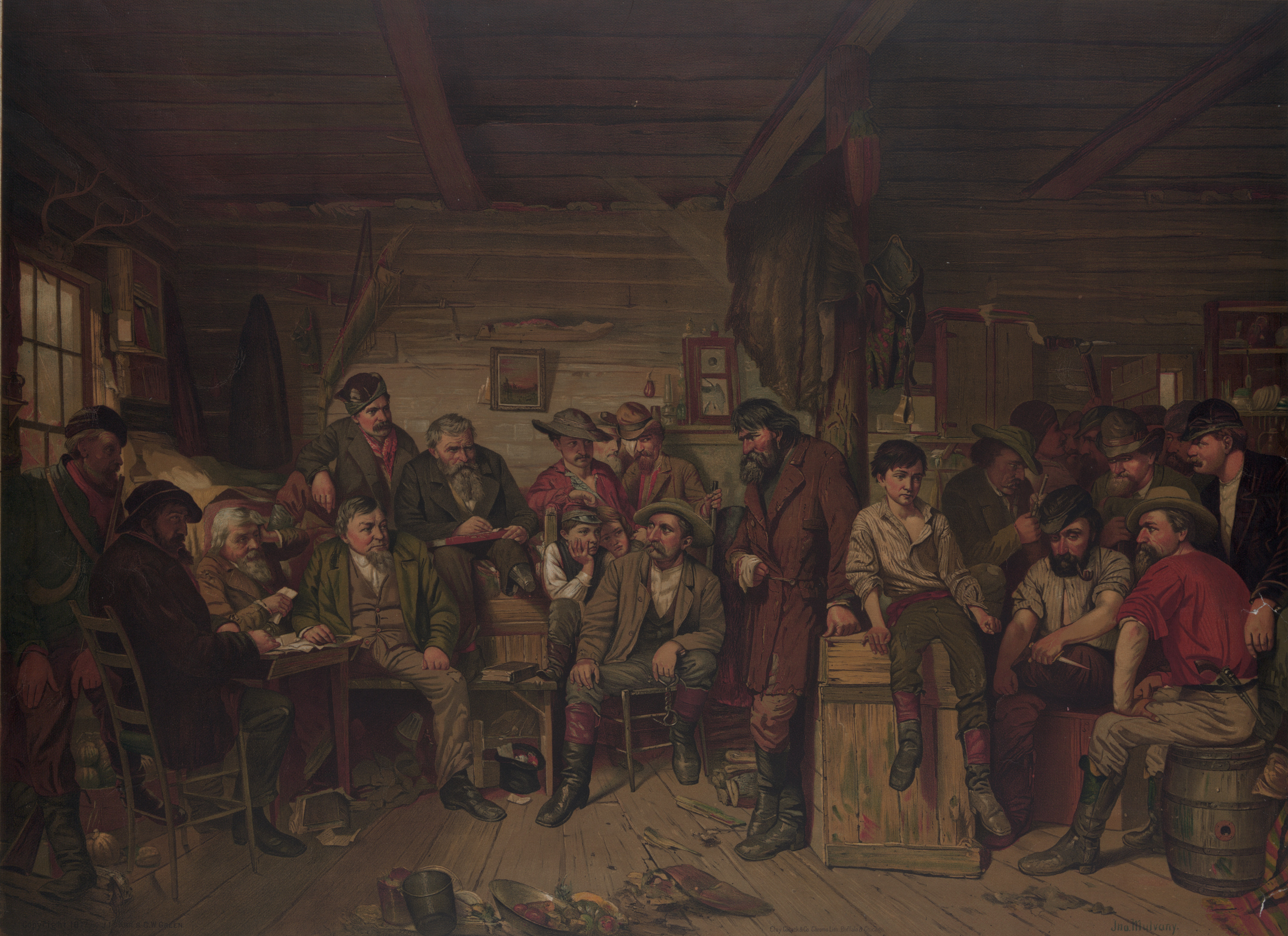
1877 chromolithograph, The trial of a horse thief

The term horse thief came into great popularity in the United States during the 19th century. During that time the Great Plains states, Texas, and other western states were sparsely populated and largely unpoliced. As farmers tilled the land and migrants headed west through the Great Plains, their horses became subject to theft. Since these farmers and migrants depended on their horses, horse thieves garnered a particularly pernicious reputation because they left their victims helpless or greatly handicapped by the loss of their horses. The victims needed their horses for transportation and farming. Such depredation led to the use of the term horse thief as an insult, one that conveys the impression of the person who perpetrated the insult as one lacking any shred of moral decency.

In Pennsylvania, the "An Act to Increase the Punishments of Horse Stealing" law was passed in 1780 and repealed in 1860, which stated people guilty of such a crime should be branded. The law ran as follows; "the first offense [the convicted] shall stand in the pillory for one hour, and shall be publicly whipped on his, her or their [bare] backs with thirty-nine lashes, well laid on, and at the same time shall have his, her or their ears cut off and nailed to the pillory, and for the second offense shall be whipped and pilloried in like manner and be branded on the forehead in a plain and visible manner with the letters H. T."

This punishment was referenced in Cormac McCarthy's novel Blood Meridian as the character Toadvine is branded with the letters H. T. on his forehead. H stands for Horse, T for Thief and F for Felon; "On his forehead were burned the letters H T and lower and almost between the eyes the letter F and these markings were splayed and garish as if the iron had been left too long. When he turned to look at the kid the kid could see that he had no ears."

In the United States, the Anti Horse Thief Association, first organized in 1854 in Clark County, Missouri, was an organization developed for the purposes of protecting property, especially horses and other livestock, from theft, and recovering such property if and when it was stolen. Originally conceived by farmers living in the area where Missouri, Illinois and Iowa intersect, it soon spread, with the first charter organization in Oklahoma Territory being created in 1894. By 1916 the associated numbered over 40,000 members in nine central and western US states, and a drop in horse thefts had been noted.

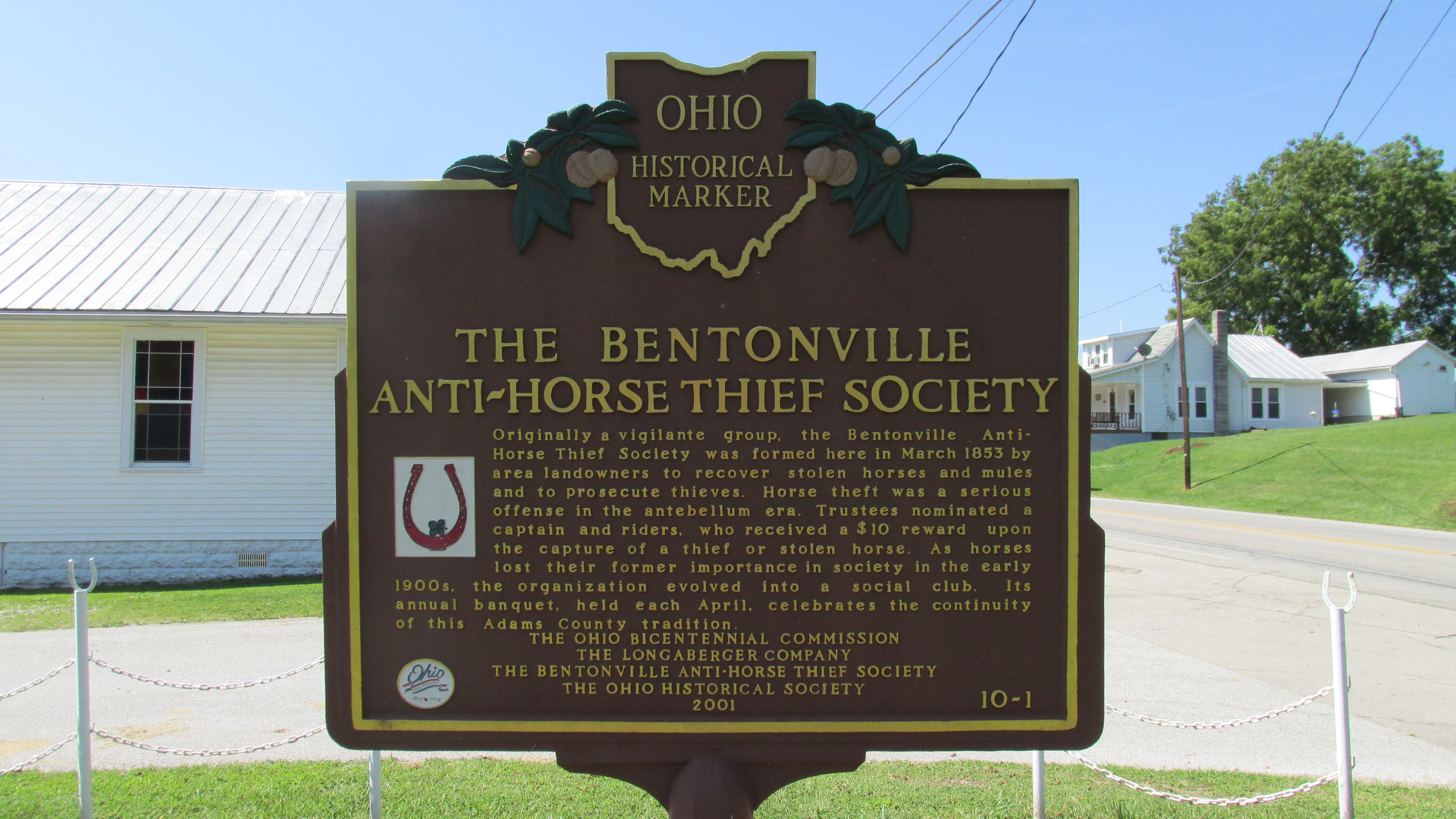
Bentonville Anti-horse Thief Society historical marker in Ohio

Between 1899 and 1909, members of the Oklahoma branch of the AHTA recovered $83,000 worth of livestock and saw the conviction of over 250 thieves. A similar group, which operated mainly in Ohio, was the Bentonville Anti-Horse Thief Society. Men suspected of being thieves would be pursued by members of the organization, and often hanged without trial. The Society in Dedham for Apprehending Horse Thieves was a third such organization that operated in the United States, this one in Dedham, Massachusetts. It is today "the oldest continually existing horse thief apprehending organization in the United States, and one of Dedham’s most venerable social organizations." Most of these clubs became defunct or developed into social clubs with the decline of horse theft in the US.

== Present day ==
Horse theft is still relatively common, with an estimated 40,000 horses a year being taken from their lawful owners by strangers or opponents in civil or legal disputes. Stolen Horse International is one modern-day organization in the US that works to reconnect stolen horses with their owners. Horses are sometimes stolen for their meat, or sometimes for money. Punishment for horse theft can still be severe, as one woman in Arkansas was sentenced to 60 years in prison for the 2011 theft of five horses and equestrian equipment; one of the horses was later found dead, while the others were recovered. Horse thefts today can in some cases be solved through the use of microchips, which is required in the European Union on horses born after 2009 and also often seen in other countries.

== Stolen racehorses ==
- Fanfreluche was stolen June 1977 from Claiborne Farm. The Thoroughbred mare was in foal to Secretariat at the time. The horse was found about 150 miles away as a stray by a farmer who kept her until December when she was identified and returned to her owners.
- Ocean Bay, a Venezuelan racehorse stolen and slaughtered in 2020 for food when the country was in economic chaos. Parts of the butchered stallion's skeleton were found just hours after the horse was discovered missing.
- Shergar was stolen for a £2 million ransom on 8 February 1983, allegedly by the IRA, and was never recovered.

== See also ==
- Cattle raiding
