= Red Hook Society for the Apprehension and Detention of Horse Thieves =

Anti-horse theft society

The Red Hook Society for the Apprehension and Detention of Horse Thieves is the oldest operating horse thief apprehension society in the United States, formed on October 10, 1796 in the town of Red Hook, New York. It has caught very few, if any, horse thieves throughout its history.

The society remains active, with about 100 members (called "riders") who pay $5 dues each year. An annual meeting is held on the first Tuesday in October, featuring dinner and a horse-related presentation, and prospective riders may be inducted into the society giving a successful speech about horses.

== Origin ==
The Red Hook Society's first notices were posted on October 28, 1796, warning would-be horse thieves that the society had been formed to stop them:

"HORSE THIEVES! Public notice is hereby given that a society is established in the upper part of Rhinebeck for the sole purpose of recovering stolen horses and apprehending the thieves, and to carry the same into effect, a number of riders are engaged to go immediately in pursuit of stolen horses, at the expense of the society, for which adequate funds are established."

The Red Hook Society, like other groups of its kind, originally "served as an insurance against loss of horses as well as a vigilante organization". Local horse owners paid a membership fee, and in return they were protected from losses if their horse was ever stolen. The society's riders were prepared to chase thieves at a moment’s notice, and the society covered search costs, as well as full value reimbursement if the horse could not be found.

A later source suggests a possible additional motivation for forming the Red Hook Society: most members rented farming plots from a few large landowners, and may have used the meetings to secretly plan land ownership and "end the landlord/tenant structure" after conversations about horse thief matters were finished, as landlords forbade such discussions among tenants. Beer, crackers, and cheese were served at meetings; full dinners started in 1891. The Red Hook Society was early to adopt the telephone as its method to alert riders of stolen horses.

== Effectiveness against horse thieves ==
There is no record of the society ever actually catching a horse thief. Ed Moore, a fourth-generation member of the society who also is the chief of police in Hudson, New York, told the Poughkeepsie Journal in 2021: "We haven't had any issues in at least the last 100 years, and I'll put that up against any police department."

== Transition into a social organization ==
Almost all anti-horse thief organizations disappeared from the United States as centralized police forces became more common in small towns, and as automobile travel replaced horse-drawn carriages; however, the Red Hook Society for the Apprehension and Detention of Horse Thieves continued to grow in number. As it collected membership dues, savings accumulated as there was no horse thievery that incurred costs. Funds were distributed to members and donated to causes, such as rebuilding a burned-down theatre. In 1943, the Red Hook Society purchased $1000 in war bonds and was praised by the press for fighting "those who steal liberty" as well as horse thieves, and "helping to draw the noose tighter around the necks of a couple of yeggs named Hitler and Hirohito."

For a short period, the society considered expanding to automobile thieves, but the proposal was defeated in a vote on the floor by riders who felt that "automobiles were in a class by themselves" and "would mar the tradition of the society." With horse thievery in the area nonexistent, the group transitioned into a social organization.

Annual meetings feature horse-focused presentations, such as a harmonica player who was called up “for a few 'horsy' numbers". By 1950, none of the 60 riders arrived to the annual meeting by horse, and in 1960 it inducted a new thief catcher who did not own a horse on which to catch thieves. "It doesn’t matter much as the 163-year-old society is mostly for fun nowadays anyway", wrote the Poughkeepsie Journal.

Longtime members have called the society "a hoot" and "no big commitment". Official records are "terrific about writing down who didn't show up, but they don't say anything about catching horse thieves," said Klose. "I can't find any report of a member ever having done anything."

After a 1951 Collier’s article highlighted the society's endurance and brought nationwide publicity, the group received “scores upon scores of letters" from people across the country asking to join. Their apparent motivation to join the organization was simply "the humor in carrying a membership card to the Red Hook Society for the Apprehension and Detention of Horse Thieves." Membership was opened up from local residents to people who lived anywhere, with lower initiation fees for locals.

In 1953, police launched the first horse theft investigation in the region since 1898, when a livestock dealer in the nearby city of Poughkeepsie awoke to galloping sounds and saw his horse, Barbara, running into the night with an unknown rider. Police contacted the Red Hook Society for the Apprehension and Detention of Horse Thieves for support. The secretary responded that Barbara's owner was not a dues-paying member eligible for Society services, nor was the location within jurisdiction. A brief official statement from the Society about the news of the missing horse appeared in newspapers: "We do not expect to organize any posse."

In some years, the society has presented a $500 scholarship to a student who wishes to study "an equine field".

== Dispute over "oldest operating anti-horse theft society" ==
In 2017, the Red Hook Society for the Apprehension and Detention of Horse Thieves sent a cease and desist letter to the Society in Dedham for Apprehending Horse Thieves in Massachusetts, for claiming to be the oldest anti-horse theft organization in the nation. The Red Hook Society attached historical records from its first meeting to show that it was 14 years older.

In 2021, the Dedham Society sent a representative to the Red Hook Society's 225th annual meeting to apologize in person and discuss anti-horse theft matters. The Dedham Society has not investigated a horse theft since 1909 but continues to meet "just in case".

== See also ==
- Bentonville Anti-Horse Thief Society
