= Ann Alexis Shorb =

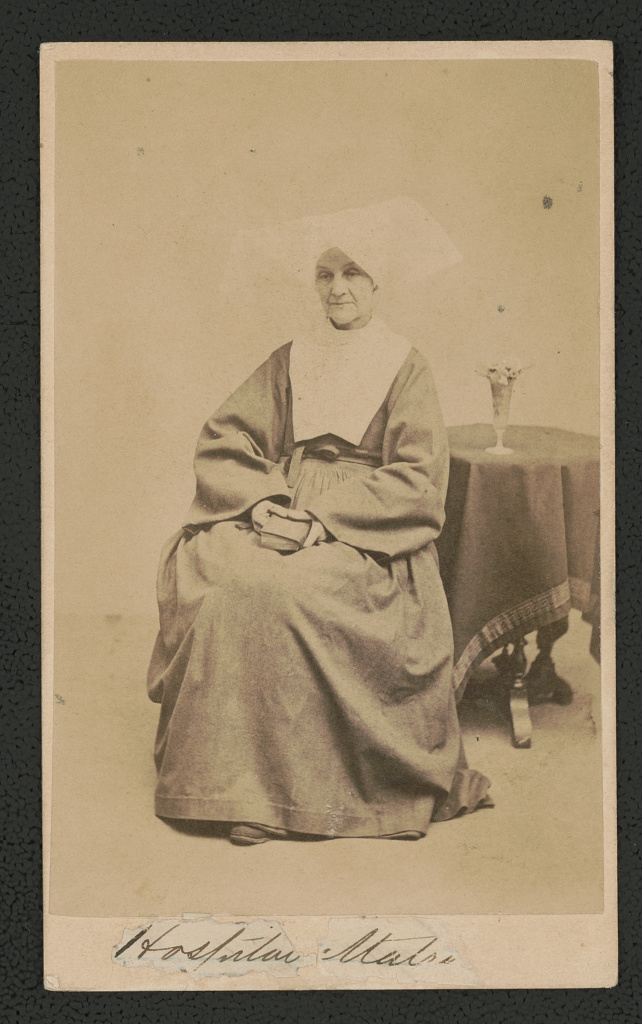
Sister Ann Alexis Shorb of the Daughters of Charity of St. Vincent de Paul

Sister Ann Alexis Shorb (1805–1875) of the Daughters of Charity of St. Vincent de Paul (born Harriet C. Shorb) was a nurse, educator, and hospital administrator. Through her work serving the poor in schools and as a nurse, Shorb helped to break down anti-Catholic prejudice. She was known as the "Servant of the Poor." Before becoming a sister, she was a member of St. Aloysius Church in Littlestown, Pennsylvania.

== Orphans ==
Shorb arrived in Boston on May 2, 1832 at the request of Bishop Benedict Fenwick who had requested the assistance of the Daughters of Charity. Once Shorb arrived with Sisters Blandina Davaux and Loyola Ritchie, they began caring for orphaned girls. They set up a school and taught religious education classes. By March 1843, the Great and General Court granted them a charter as the St. Vincent's Orphan Asylum. It was the first Catholic charitable organization in the state. The Asylum cared for girls between 3 and 10 without regard to their religion. Shorb ran the Asylum for the next 40 years. When the asylum was too small to take in more children, she organized a fair that raised $10,000 in two weeks.

In 1866, the Sisters of Charity founded the St. Mary's School and Asylum at what was formerly the Norfolk House in Dedham, Massachusetts. Shorb, along with two others, purchased the property for $1 by Martin Bates who, out of a "spirit of vindictiveness," gave it to the Sisters because the Town of Dedham would not purchase the run down building from him at his asking price.

== Nursing and hospital administrator ==
Shorb was the first administrator at Carney Hospital, the first Catholic hospital in New England, at the request of founder Andrew Carney. She served in that role from 1863 to 1870. She was also an incorporator the St. John's Hospital in Lowell, Massachusetts. Shorb was the head nurse at Satterlee General Hospital.

== Legacy ==
Shorb is featured on the Nine Notable Women of Boston mural, painted by Ellen Lanyon in honor of Boston's 350th anniversary.

== Works cited ==
- Austin, Walter (1912). Tale of a Dedham Tavern: History of the Norfolk Hotel, Dedham, Massachusetts. Riverside Press.
- Hanson, Robert Brand (1976). Dedham, Massachusetts, 1635-1890. Dedham Historical Society.
- Hurd, Duane Hamilton (1884). History of Norfolk County, Massachusetts: With Biographical Sketches of Many of Its Pioneers and Prominent Men. J. W. Lewis & Company.
