= James Allen (highwayman) =

American highwayman (1809–1837)

- Born: November 16, 1809; Lancaster, Massachusetts
- Died: July 17, 1837 (aged 27); Massachusetts State Prison, Charlestown, Boston, Massachusetts
- Other names: George Walton, Jonas Pierce, James H. York, Burley Grove
- Occupation: Highwayman
- Known for: 1837 deathbed confession to the warden published as the Narrative of the Life of James Allen.

James Allen (November 16, 1809 – July 17, 1837), also known as George Walton, Jonas Pierce, James H. York, and Burley Grove, was an American highwayman.

== Start in crime ==
According to his confession, Allen made many attempts to find work in his early teens but turned to theft after multiple employers failed to pay him what he was owed. Allen was in and out of prison from 1825-1837, eventually imprisoned in the Massachusetts State Prison, which opened in 1805, in Charlestown, Boston, Massachusetts.

== Jabez Boyden robbery ==
Allen was released from the Charlestown state prison in December 1833 after a two year term for robbery. Upon his release, the warden advised him to make his "living by honest industry" instead of crime. Allen responded that he was not sure what direction his life would take following his release.

As soon as he was out, Allen purchased a pair of pistols and hid out in the woods along the Dedham Turnpike near the Roxbury line. Allen robbed Deacon Jabez Boyden of Dedham's Second Parish at gunpoint as he drove a wagon of goods down to Dedham.

== Dedham fires ==
Around two o'clock in the morning on October 30, 1832, a fire broke out in the stable of Bride's Inn in Dedham, Massachusetts and quickly traveled to the hotel, leveling both in 90 minutes. The fire killed 66 horses and one man, who was sleeping in the barn. It was assumed that the man, a veteran of the Revolution walking to Washington, D.C. to beg for a pension, was the cause of the fire. The veteran was buried at the local cemetery, and it took several days to cart all of the dead horses down to the marshes where their carcasses could be sunk into the mud.

Bride rebuilt the inn, naming it the Phoenix Hotel in honor of it rising from the ashes. Another fire broke out in the stables around 2:00 a.m. on January 7, 1834, just 15 months later. After the second fire, the stables were rebuilt further down Washington Street and away from the hotel.

Around the time of the second fire, 70 or 80 horses owned by another stagecoach company were poisoned in a neighboring community, growing suspicions that the repeated fires were not accidental and might perhaps be related to the stagecoach companies. The Dedham Selectmen offered a $500 reward for the capture of the arsonist, and the Citizen's Stagecoach Company offered an additional $500.

John Wade, a resident at the competing Norfolk House, got drunk one evening and mentioned that he knew something about the first fire. He was arrested within an hour and eventually confessed that he had been hired by the owner of the Norfolk House to light the first fire. Allen was later identified as the culprit in the second fire and was indicted, but he died of consumption in prison before he could be tried.

== Aborted bank robbery ==
Allen returned to Boston after robbing Boyden. He committed several more thefts before meeting up with John Wade, whom he knew from prison. The two considered robbing a bank in Rhode Island but, finding it too well guarded, decided to return to Massachusetts. During this time, Wade hinted to Allen that he was responsible for burning down Bride's Tavern. He also let Allen known that he knew Allen was responsible for the Boyden robbery.

The pair rented a room at the Norfolk House in Dedham. When the Phoenix Hotel caught fire again, Allen suspected Wade and quickly left, heading towards communities north of Boston.

== Fenno robbery ==
Allen attempted to rob a wagon driven by Mr. Presser and John Fenno along the Salem Turnpike. Fenno leapt from the wagon onto Allen, and Allen's gun discharged. The bullet was deflected off a buckle on Fenno's suspenders. Allen escaped on his horse, but was arrested three days later on January 16.

== Trials ==
After a three day trial, Allen was convicted of the attempted robbery of Fenno. He was sentenced to 20 years at the Charlestown state prison, plus two years at hard labor.

In May 1834, Allen was indicted for the Boyden robbery. Before he could be brought to Dedham, he escaped and ran off to Canada. In April 1835, he was arrested when he was found back in Boston.

At the trial, Allen was defended by Horace Mann, who tried to place a reasonable doubt in the minds of the jury by pointing out that Boyden had previously identified someone else as the man who robbed him. The strategy worked, and there was a hung jury.

In November, while in prison awaiting his second trial, Allen was able to break free from the chains that kept him attached to the ground, jump the jailer who was bringing him a meal, and then run full speed up a set of stairs with the jailer on his back. A second jailer stopped them and threatened to club Allen, at which point he stopped trying to run, saying: "No harm done." A subsequent inspection of his cell found seven small files, two files, one chisel, a hammer, and a knife hidden inside a hollowed out handle.

His second trial also ended in a hung jury, at which time he was returned to the Charleston prison.

== Confessions and death ==
Allen died in the Charlestown prison of consumption.

While in Charlestown, Allen became deathly ill. He spoke openly to the warden, confessing many crimes but denying any involvement with the burning of the tavern in Dedham. The warden wrote down much of what Allen told him and published it as the Narrative of the Life of James Allen, alias Jonas Pierce, alias James H. York, alias Burley Grove, the Highwayman, Being His Death-bed Confession to the Warden of the Massachusetts State Prison.

Allen said that Fenno was the only brave man he ever met. He asked that a copy of the book be bound in his own skin and given to Fenno. After his death, a large patch of skin was removed from his back and tanned. On the cover was written "Hic Liber Waltonis Cute Compatus Est," or "Here is the book Walton made of his own skin." The book was given to Fenno, and his family kept it for many years. When Fenno's children and grandchildren misbehaved, they were paddled with the book. Today, it is in the collections of the Boston Athenaeum.

== Works cited ==
- Hanson, Robert Brand (1976). Dedham, Massachusetts, 1635-1890. Dedham Historical Society.
- Parr, James L. (2009). Dedham: Historic and Heroic Tales From Shiretown. The History Press. ISBN 978-1-59629-750-0.
- Cook, Louis Atwood (1918). History of Norfolk County, Massachusetts, 1622-1918. S.J. Clarke publishing Company.

== Bibliography ==
Allen, James. Narrative of the Life of James Allen, alias Jonas Pierce, alias James H. York, alias Burley Grove, the Highwayman, Being His Death-bed Confession to the Warden of the Massachusetts State Prison. Boston: Harrington and Co., 1837.
