= 369 Washington Street =

Fraternal and commercial building in Dedham, Massachusetts

Coordinates: 42°14′54.5″N 71°10′24.5″W

369 Washington Street, also known as the Knights of Columbus building, is a fraternal and commercial building in Dedham, Massachusetts. Today it houses the local Knights of Columbus council and a number of commercial ventures. In the past, the property housed a number of taverns, including the Phoenix Hotel. Several notable guests, including Andrew Jackson and James Monroe, have visited the property.

== History ==
The Colburn family home was built in the 1650s. When Samuel Colburn died as a soldier in the Crown Point Expedition, he bequeathed 135 acres across eight parcels to St. Paul's Church, including much of what is today known as Dedham Square. (Note: The bequeath was somewhat odd as Colburn was neither an Anglican nor a member of the congregation.)

The Norfolk and Bristol Turnpike created modern day Washington Street from High Street in Dedham Square to the Roxbury line. The creation of the road necessitated moving and reorienting the Colburn family home, a building which had stood in the same spot since the 1650s. It originally sat across what is today the road, and was moved to a position on the new corner where 369 Washington Street is today on the northwest corner of the Washington Street-High Street intersection. (Note: The turnpike then turned west to Court Street, where it ran south to Washington Street, and then straight to Pawtucket, Rhode Island.)

When the turnpike opened in 1803, Timothy Gay moved his tavern from the corner of Court Street and Highland Street to where the new road met High Street. (Note: Gay was also the owner of the Citizen Stagecoach Line and, due to this, all of the stagecoaches traveling between Providence and Boston stopped at his tavern. All of the coaches for the Citizen Stagecoach Line were built in Dedham as well. Gay paid $5,000 a year to use the turnpike, and was able to get a coach from one city to the other in just under three and a half hours.) Gay's Tavern would be out of business by 1810, but was then operated by a number of others who gave the business their name, including Calp, Smith, Polley, Alden, and Bride.

John Bride was proprietor by 1832 and it was an attractive hotel that could handle the relay of horses and the needs of the many passengers who passed through each day. The 12 to 15 coaches that pulled up each day typically had seven or more people in each. The stable housed over 100 horses at any given time. Teams of eight horses could be swapped out in two minutes.

Annual and special meetings of the Society in Dedham for Apprehending Horse Thieves were held at the hotel after 1849.

=== 999 year lease ===
In 1851, St. Paul's and Josiah D. Howe entered into a 999-year lease for the land for $55 a year. Howe ran the Phoenix House where, among other notable happenings, the Massachusetts Association of Base Ball Players met in 1858 to establish the rules of the “Massachusetts Game.”

The lease was still in effect when the Knights acquired the land in 1920. It did not end until 1999, when a vote of the rector, wardens, and vestry of St. Paul's released the Knights from the terms of the lease 851 years early.

== Current building ==
The main portion of the current building was constructed in 1897. In 1926, an addition was added to the rear of the building. Measuring 30' by 100', it was designed by Rowell Victor Provost (Note: Provost lived on Oak Street in East Dedham.) and cost $50,000. The second floor was gutted, and new offices and workworking were installed. Two new storefronts were added on the first floor, while the existing tenants, Cole's drug store, Gilbert's lunchroom, and the post office, gained additional space.

In 1959, a new facade and roofline would be added to the building. Included in this renovation was arched brick above the High Street front with a clock featuring the Knights’ logo. In 1977, the clock was shot and the bullet broke the clock. It was repaired, but broke down about a year and a half later.

== Knights of Columbus era ==
Dedham Council #234 of the Knights of Columbus met for the first time on December 2, 1897. (Note: The council met in Cycle Hall above the Snow Brothers Grocery Store on High Street. Charles A. Finn was a charter member.) That night the council only had two orders of business, to elect officers (Note: Charles K. Scrivener was elected Grand Knight and Fr. C.P. Heaney was elected chaplain.) and to appoint four members to find a permanent meeting location. (Note: Early meetings were held in the Grand Army of the Republic Hall, the Hibernian Hall, the Odd Fellows Hall, and the Greenleaf Building.)

The Knights of Columbus Building Association of Dedham was established on September 21, 1920. (Note: They met in Hibernian Hall with Daniel H. Maher as president.) After an aborted attempt to purchase another property at the corner of High and East Streets, the Association voted on August 3, 1920, to purchase 369 Washington Street.

The Association sold 642 shares to the Council and 258 shares to 144 members, raising a total of $9,000. They also obtained a mortgage at 12% from Dedham Savings. On September 27, 1920, the property was conveyed to the Association's trustees. (Note: Thomas J. Hannon, Paul S. Barry, Thomas J. Brennan, Daniel Maher, and Charles W. Harris.) The sale was coordinated by Judge Joseph R. McCoole, a past grand knight of the council.

The keynote speaker for the dedication of the new council chambers, which was paneled in wood and could hold 300 people, was then-Massachusetts State Secretary John E. Swift. (Note: A number of other dignitaries from the Knights and the community attended, and Tom Lilli’s Orchestra provided dance music.) The Building Association suffered financially during the Great Depression, but by 1936 the Town's tercentenary celebrations committee was operating out of donated space in the building.

In 1946, part of the property was sold to Allen Motors. On October 11, 1956, the Council held a celebration at Dedham High School where Charles A. Finn burned the mortgage.

When President John F. Kennedy was assassinated in 1963, the flag above the building flew at half mast and black bunting covered the clock on the face of the building.

== Tenants ==
The Town of Dedham's Board of Health rented space on the second floor into the 1960s, when Memorial Hall was torn down and they moved to the new town hall on Bryant Street. Rather than fill the space with a new tenant, the Knights took the space for themselves, building a suite of club rooms including a large kitchen.

Another agency of the Town of Dedham, the Youth Commission, moved into the building in 1971. They were evicted as of January 1, 1975, however, because the teenagers who were hanging around the building caused problems for other tenants. The rented rooms were only supposed to be used as office space, but teenagers congregated there anyway, forcing clients of other tenants to step over them as they entered the building.

As of 2020, tenants in the building include the music school Jam Zone, the bakery La Luce, the barber shop Sergi's, Armando Cassano's Hair Studio, and Terra Spa.

== Works cited ==
- Austin, Walter (1912). Tale of a Dedham Tavern: History of the Norfolk Hotel, Dedham, Massachusetts. Priv. print. at the Riverside Press.
- Cook, Louis Atwood (1918). History of Norfolk County, Massachusetts, 1622-1918. S.J. Clarke publishing Company.
- Hanson, Robert Brand (1976). Dedham, Massachusetts, 1635-1890. Dedham Historical Society.
- Parr, James L. (2009). Dedham: Historic and Heroic Tales From Shiretown. The History Press. ISBN 978-1-59629-750-0.
