= Moseley's on the Charles =

Coordinates: 42°16′10″N 71°10′28″W

Moseley's on the Charles, located on the banks of the Charles River in Dedham, Massachusetts, was the oldest continuous-running ballroom in the country. Founded in 1905 by Elisha Moseley, it originally functioned as a summer canoe house in addition to the ballroom.

Duke Ellington's Washingtonians, Harry James, Les Brown, Buddy Rich, The Platters, Lenny Clarke, Pat Cooper, and Steve Sweeney have all performed in the hall. Each December it hosts the annual meeting of The Society in Dedham for Apprehending Horse Thieves.

In 1998 it was purchased by Edward DeVincenzo, who began working in the coatroom years before. It closed in 2022.
