= Dedham Inn =

Building in Dedham, Massachusetts

Coordinates: 42.2458°N 71.1778°W

The Dedham Inn was an inn on Court Street in Dedham, Massachusetts. It housed several notable guests at the corner of Court Street and Highland Street before burning down in 1939.

== Early history ==
During the American Revolution, General Lafayette's men camped on the land that would later adjoin the inn.

The home was built in 1791 and was said to have been designed by Charles Bulfinch. (Note: Bullfinch also designed the Haven house a few blocks away.)

A year before the construction, the land was sold to John M. Lovell for 36 pounds. In 1792, Lovell sold the house and land to Samuel Brock Jr. for 576 pounds. The next owner was John Madey, who sold it to Alexander Hodgdon in 1795. His widow sold it to Samuel "Blind Samuel" Richards in 1803. Richards was born in Dedham but later moved to Boston and became a hardware merchant. After going blind, he returned to Dedham.

Richards' son, Edward Metcalf Richards, later owned the house. (Note: Edward was vice president of the Massachusetts Horticultural Society and died in 1865.) His wife, Rebecca (née Guild), said that when she first moved into the home that as many as 20 stagecoaches a day would pass by the house, many stopping at Gay's Tavern across the street. The rear portion of the home was torn down in 1878 and a new addition added. The home and land would remain in the Richard family for 114 years.

== Use as an inn ==
In 1915, the house was purchased by Robert M. Morse, (Note: The Library of Congress source has another name, which is illegible, printed in the original document. It is crossed out and Morse's name is handwritten next to it.) expanded, and converted into an inn. It quickly became a popular venue for events.

Just a few years later, in 1919, Mary Miles Minter and William Desmond Taylor stayed at the inn while filming Anne of Green Gables. In 1920, a film version of Henry Wadsworth Longfellow's poem The Bell of Atri was filmed in Dedham on the Town Common. The major players ate at the Dedham Inn.

During the Sacco and Vanzetti trial, the sequestered jurors would eat at the inn. So, too, would judge Webster Thayer, the newspapermen covering the trial, and most of those connected with the courthouse. Several of those newspapermen would later submit an affidavit that swore they heard Thayer making prejudicial remarks at the inn.

== Fire ==
In 1927, George Thorley (Note: Thorley was a member of the Dedham Board of Assessors.) purchased the inn. At 3:30 in the morning of February 6, 1939 Thorley's cockerspaniel, Josephine began barking and woke up the family. The house was on fire, and Thorley, his wife, their two daughters, two boarders, and one guest were able to get out of the house to safety. (Note: One guest was Billy Murray, the captain of the 1919 Harvard Crimson football team. At the time, Murray was the district supervisor of the National Youth Administration.) The seven attempted to get down the front stairs, but were repelled by the flames. They escaped out the back instead.

Frank Howard, the guest, had trouble finding a fire alarm box but eventually located one on the corner of Court Street and Village Avenue. By holding the lever down, instead of simply pulling it down and releasing it, he interfered with the sounding of the whistle that indicated the location of the fire. The correct location was noted inside the fire station, however.

Chief Henry J. Harrigan sounded a general alarm upon arriving on scene when he saw the Highland Street side of the building completely engulfed. The entire Dedham Fire Department battled the flames for five hours, but the snow and ice created additional challenges. They used nine fire hoses to spray water on the house. The fire, which was likely caused by a faulty furnace, gutted the interior of the home. Only the exterior walls were left standing and it was razed.

Lost in the fire were 50 oil paintings by Magdeline Thorley, George's wife, an accomplished painter. One was worth $1,500. (Note: More than $33,000 in 2024 dollars.) All of the clothes and possessions of the Thorley family, their boarders, and their guest were lost. Deputy Chief John Hartnett and firefighter William Henderson entered the building and attempted to rescue the dog, but were unsuccessful and Josephine perished in the flames.

The Thorley's daughter, Barbara, taught a kindergarten in the building.

== Present day ==
In 1950–51, the property was subdivided and three new homes were built on it. Four granite fence posts on Court Street are all the remain of the original building.

== Works cited ==
- Parr, James L. (2009). Dedham: Historic and Heroic Tales From Shiretown. The History Press. ISBN 978-1-59629-750-0.
