= Massachusetts Game =

Type of baseball

The Massachusetts Game was a type of amateur club baseball popular in 19th century Massachusetts and other areas of New England. It was an organized and codified version of local games called "base" or "round ball", and related to Philadelphia town ball and rounders. The Massachusetts Game is remembered as a rival of the New York Game of baseball, which was based on Knickerbocker Rules. In the end, however, it was the New York style of play which was adopted as the "National Game" and was the fore-runner of modern baseball.

== Rules ==
The form of the Massachusetts Game that is best known today comes from a set of rules drawn up in 1858 by the Massachusetts Association of Base Ball Players at the Phoenix Hotel in Dedham. Although it was recognizably a type of baseball, some features of the Massachusetts Game are very different from modern baseball:

- The playing field had four bases, 60 feet (18 m) apart. The fourth base was still called Home, but the "striker" stood midway between fourth and first base.
- Fielders were allowed to put a runner out by hitting him with a thrown ball—a practice called "soaking" or "plugging".
- There was no foul territory, and baserunners were not required to stay within the baselines.

Two "modern" features of the Massachusetts Game were not present in New York-style rules drawn up the same year by National Association of Base Ball Players.

- "The Ball must be thrown—not pitched or tossed." In the jargon of the times (as in cricket), throwing meant delivering the ball overhand. The NABBP rules state "The ball must be pitched, not jerked nor thrown", meaning delivered underhand. Major League baseball did not allow overhand pitching for another 25 years.
- "The ball must be caught flying in all cases." Under New York rules, a catch on one bounce was still allowed (cf. "on the full" in cricket).

== Style of play ==
The Massachusetts Game was more wide-open than modern "New York" baseball, with more scoring and, its proponents claimed, more excitement.

First base was only 30 feet (9.1 m) away from the striker. There was a constant supply of baserunners, and much more action on the basepaths. The "soaking" rule was mitigated by the lightness of the ball, about 2 1/2 ounces (71 g) compared to 5 ounces (140 g) for a modern baseball. The runner could evade the fielders' throws by leaving the baseline.

The absence of foul territory allowed a skillful striker to literally "use the whole field" when he put the ball in play. One of a striker's greatest skills (writes David Block) was to tip the ball back over the catcher's head. The rules allowed 10 to 14 players on a side, to help cover the whole field. But put-outs were hard to come by, so the rule was "one out, all out" - a team's inning ended when one player was put out. Runs were plentiful. The rules declared the winner to be the first team to score 100 runs.

In an appreciation of the Massachusetts Game, sports historian John Thorn wrote in The Boston Globe of Sunday, July 10, 2005: "All that the Massachusetts Game had going for it was joy."

== Ball clubs playing the Massachusetts Game ==
The Olympic Club of Boston, "established in 1854, was the first regularly organized Club in the State, and for over a year the only one in the field." The Elm-Tree Club played the first match game against the Olympic club, but was short-lived. The Green Mountain Club, established 1856, played many matches on Boston Common against the Olympics. Others playing by the Massachusetts Rules included the American, Bay State, Bunker Hill, and Rough-and-Ready Clubs (all organized in 1857), and the Alpha of Ashland, Bowdoin, Fayville of Southborough, Lowell, Shawmut, Takewambait of Natick, Yankee of Natick, and Waponset Clubs. There was also a junior club called the Hancocks. Many Boston firms closed on Saturday afternoons so their clerks could benefit from the game. A team of truckmen also played in the early mornings on Boston Common, before beginning their work day.

As Kirsch relates in Baseball in Blue and Gray, in June 1857 an informal Massachusetts championship tournament was held, with about 2,000 spectators attending the first round. Twenty-five runs were needed to win a game, and three victories decided the match. The Wassapoag (or Massapoag) club of Sharon defeated the Olympics but then lost to the Union Club of Medway. Some confusion over the rules at this tournament led to the Dedham convention the following year, at which rules were drawn up. The rules as adopted were those of the Takewambait Club. Members of the Tri-Mountain Club – founded by an Edward Saltzman, a transplant from the Gotham Club – lobbied hard for New York rules, but the Tri-Mountains were in a minority. (They dropped out of the association, and began playing the New York style.)

In June 1858 the Winthrop Club of Holliston beat the Olympics on Boston Common by a score 100 to 27, in a 4-hour game before 3,000 spectators. In September 1859 Winthrop Club battled the Union Club for the state championship. The two-day match drew huge crowds to the Boston Agricultural Fair Grounds, to see the Unions defeat the Winthrops, 100–71.

By 1860, 59 New England teams were reportedly playing the Massachusetts Game, while at least 18 had gone over to New York style.

== Massachusetts Game distinctions ==
Two "longest game" records are held by Massachusetts rules contests.

- On July 28, 1859, in a game at Ashland, the Medway Unions defeated the Upton Excelsiors 100–78 in 211 innings. Although these innings were defined by one out – and not three – this was the most innings ever played in a baseball game.
- The following year, at the Worcester Agricultural Fairgrounds the same two clubs played the longest game ever in the history of baseball. According to Philip J. Lowry in the SABR 2004 Baseball Research Journal: "The game was scheduled to begin Sep 25, 1860. Play continued through Sep 26, 27, 28; Oct 1, 4, and 5 until finally it was called a complete game with the score Upton 50 Medway 29. The game took a record 21 hours 50 minutes of actual game time." They generally played each day from 9:30 a.m. to 5:00 pm, with a one-hour break for lunch. In one contemporary journalist's opinion, "The time occupied in playing the game under such rules was, we think, rather too much of a good thing."
- Irving Leitner designates the same 1860 match as the first baseball game played for a monetary stake. Upton had originally issued a challenge to the Brooklyn Atlantics - champions of the New York Game - the terms to be $1000 winner take all, 100 runs, Massachusetts rules. After much consideration the Atlantics declined, citing a lack of practice time (but scoffing at the idea that Upton was any match for them). Medway took Brooklyn's place for the same stakes. Although the rules required 100 tallies for a victory, the two clubs agreed to call it a complete game at 50. After six days and 172 innings of play, rain prevented resumption on the seventh day, and the lease on the field had run out. The victorious Upton Excelsiors declared themselves baseball champions of the world.
- The first intercollegiate baseball match was played between Amherst College and Williams College, under Massachusetts rules on July 1, 1859, at Pittsfield. Amherst issued the challenge to a baseball match, and Williams counter-challenged them to a chess match. They agreed on Pittsfield as a neutral site, hosted by the Pittsfield Base Ball Club and Pittsfield Chess Club. A newspaper headline announced "Williams and Amherst Base Ball and Chess! Muscle and Mind!!" Each base ball team fielded 13 players, chosen by vote of the student body. Amherst won 73–32 in 26 innings. The next day Amherst completed the sweep by winning the chess match as well.

== Civil War period ==
During the American Civil War, soldiers from Massachusetts often played their brand of baseball when competing among themselves, but sometimes switched to New York rules when playing men from that state. Kirsch tells of the 19th Massachusetts Regiment encamped in Falmouth in early 1863 when a "baseball fever broke out." Later that year the Clipper reported a Massachusetts Rules match for $60 a side, between the 11th Massachusetts and the 26th Pennsylvania Regiment.

While the Massachusetts Game was popular among soldiers, it was losing favor on the home front. Particularly damaging was a trip to Boston by the mighty Excelsior Club of Brooklyn in 1862. The Brooklynites defeated the Bowdoins, 41–15, then a picked nine from the Tri-Mountains and Lowells, 39–13. This began a conversion of the Boston clubs to the New York style of play. By the end of the war, the country had standardized around the New York Game. One sporting periodical announced:

The National Association or "New-York game" is now almost universally adopted by the Clubs all over the country; and the Massachusetts, and still more ancient style of playing familiar to any school-boy, called "town ball," will soon become obsolete. No lover of the pastime can regret this, as the New-York mode is superior and more attractive in every way; and better calculated to perpetuate and render "our national game" an "institution" with both "young and old America."

== See also ==
- Origins of baseball
- Vintage base ball

== Citations ==
- Seymour, Harold (1989) [1st Pub. 1960]. Baseball: The Early Years. New York: Oxford University Press. ISBN 0-19-505912-3.
- Leitner, Irving A. (1972). Baseball: The Diamond in the Rough. New York: Criterion Books. ISBN 0-200-71792-8.
- Kirsch, George B. (2003). Baseball in Blue and Gray: The National Pastime during the Civil War. Princeton: Princeton University Press. ISBN 0-691-13043-4.
- Block, David (2005). Baseball Before We Knew It: A Search for the Roots of the Game. Lincoln: University of Nebraska Press. ISBN 0-8032-1339-5.
