= Bentonville Anti-Horse Thief Society =

Organization founded in Ohio in 1853

The Bentonville Anti-Horse Thief Society was founded in Bentonville, Ohio, in March 1853.

== History ==
Founded in 1853, the group for a time was defunct and restarted in 1863 by David McKee. The society was created to stop horse thievery, since horses were essential to transportation and farming in the 19th century.

The society has been operational for over 150 years, allowing anyone to join. Previously, the cost of membership and dues went to the recovery of horses and hanging of the thief.

While horse thievery is no longer a problem, the society still operates. It holds meetings with the function shifted from a citizens enforcement group to a social club. The society holds an annual banquet on the last Saturday of April.

Lifetime membership is granted for a donation of $1.

== See also ==
- The Society in Dedham for Apprehending Horse Thieves
- Red Hook Society for the Apprehension and Detention of Horse Thieves
