= Ocean Bay =

Venezuelan racehorse

Ocean Bay, foaled 2013, reported as killed June 9, 2020, was a Venezuelan racehorse known for winning two of Venezuela's three Triple Crown races in 2016. Ocean Bay sustained an injury, but the horse returned the next year to win five more races.

On June 8, 2020, an employee at the Haras farm in Tocorón noticed that Ocean Bay was missing. Three months before, Ocean Bay's mother and six other purebred horses had been stolen and slaughtered. Ocean Bay's skeleton was found hours later near the town's jail. The nation of Venezuela has been suffering a hunger and economic crisis since 2010.
