= St. Mary's School and Asylum =

United States historic place

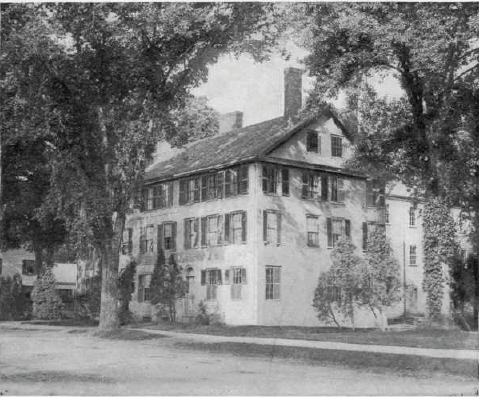
- The school at the turn of the 20th century, shortly after it closed.
- Interactive map of the St. Mary's School and Asylum area

General information
- Architectural style: Federal
- Location: 19 Court Street, Dedham, Massachusetts
- Coordinates: 42.2485°N 71.1772°W

St. Mary's School and Asylum was a Catholic girls' school and orphanage in Dedham, Massachusetts.

In 1866 the Sisters of Charity founded the St. Mary's School and Asylum at what was formerly the Norfolk House. The property was sold to them (Note: Actually sold to Ann Alexis Shorb, Andrea Corry, and Aloysia Reed as trustees.) for $1 by Martin Bates who, out of a "spirit of vindictiveness," gave it to the Sisters because the Town of Dedham would not purchase the run down building from him at his asking price. Bates, who was not Catholic, had previously tried selling the building at auction, but could find no buyer willing to pay a price equal to his mortgage. At news of the sale, the Dedham Gazette wrote in an editorial:

Whatever prejudices may naturally exist against the establishment of a Roman Catholic School in so central a location, the community cannot but feel that the transformation of a building recently used only for the indiscriminate sale of liquors into an institution founded for 'promoting virtue, learning and piety in the town of Dedham' is an object worthy only of the most exalted motives, and in this view should be accepted as a public blessing.

Soon after Sister Catherine of Syracuse, New York, Sister Veronica of Troy, New York, and Sister Anselm of Chicago, Illinois, arrived on July 20, 1866, they endeared themselves to the community. One year later, the school was educating 60 girls and was home to 10 orphans. By 1871, the first parochial school in Norfolk County was winning praise in the press for "elevating the foreign class both intellectually and morally."

The school was situated far away from the homes of many parishioners of the local Catholic Church, St. Mary's, and thus they did not send their children to it. Since they did not send their children to it, they did not support it financially either. The school held a number of fundraisers, but with the heavy debt of the parish the school closed on June 27, 1879. It would have cost the parish $1,500 a year to keep it open. The closure was intended to be temporary, but it never reopened. The building was sold in 1905.

The School's superiors included Sisters Mary Ann Alexis, Mary Frances, and Mary Vincent, and its teachers included Sisters Mary Josephine, Mary Martin, Mary Genevieve, Mary Theotina, Mary Victorina, and Mary Vincent, among others.

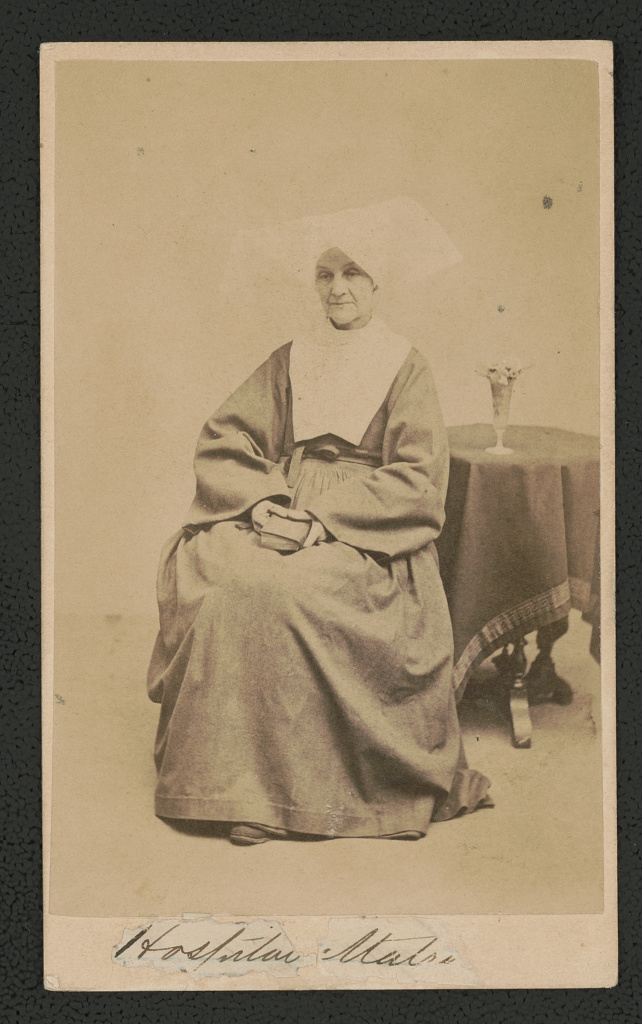
Sister Ann Alexis Shorb, a trustee of the school.

== See also ==
- History of education in Dedham, Massachusetts

== Works cited ==
- Austin, Walter (1912). Tale of a Dedham tavern: history of the Norfolk hotel, Dedham, Massachusetts. Riverside Press.
- Hurd, Duane Hamilton (1884). History of Norfolk County, Massachusetts: With Biographical Sketches of Many of Its Pioneers and Prominent Men. J. W. Lewis & Company.
- Smith, Frank (1936). A History of Dedham, Massachusetts. Transcript Press. "st mary dedham."
- Lord, Robert Howard; Sexton, John E.; Harrington, Edward T. (1944). History of the Archdiocese of Boston, 1886-1943. Sheed & Ward.
- Byrne, William; Leahy, W. A.; Dowling, Austin; Young, E. J. A.; Finen, J. E. (1899). Introductory. The Hurd & Everts co. pp. 323–324.
- Hanson, Robert Brand (1976). Dedham, Massachusetts, 1635-1890. Dedham Historical Society.
- Parr, James L. (2009). Dedham: Historic and Heroic Tales From Shiretown. The History Press. ISBN 978-1-59629-750-0.
