= Phoenix Hotel (Dedham, Massachusetts) =

United States historic place

Coordinates: 42.2485°N 71.1735°W

The Phoenix Hotel was one of the most popular social spots in Dedham during the 19th century. It was located on the northwest corner of the High Street-Washington Street intersection in modern-day Dedham Square. Among the distinguished guests of this hotel were Andrew Jackson and James Monroe.

The hotel was named after the phoenix of mythology, as it was rebuilt after a devastating fire. It would suffer several arsons before finally burning to the ground in 1880. Before it did, it would play a role in the origins of baseball by hosting the inaugural meeting of the Massachusetts Association of Baseball Players.

== History ==
When the Norfolk and Bristol Turnpike was opened in 1803, Timothy Gay moved his tavern from the corner of Court Street and Highland Street to where the new road met High Street. Gay was also the owner of the Citizen Stagecoach Line and, due to this, all of the stagecoaches traveling between Providence and Boston stopped at his tavern. (Note: All of the coaches for the Citizen Stagecoach Line were built in Dedham as well.) Gay paid $5,000 a year to use the turnpike, and was able to get a coach from one city to the other in just under three and a half hours.

It would be out of business by 1810, but was then operated by a number of others who gave the business their name, including Calp, Smith, Polley, Alden, and Bride. John Bride was proprietor by 1832 and it was an attractive hotel that could handle the relay of horses and the needs of the many passengers who passed through each day. The 12 to 15 coaches that pulled up each day typically had seven or more people in each. The stable housed over 100 horses at any given time. Teams of eight horses could be swapped out in two minutes.

Annual and special meetings of the Society in Dedham for Apprehending Horse Thieves were held at the hotel after 1849.

== Fires ==
=== Four fires ===
Around two o'clock in the morning on October 30, 1832, a fire broke out in the stable and quickly traveled to the hotel, leveling both in 90 minutes. The fire killed 66 horses and one man, who was sleeping in the barn. It was assumed that the man, a veteran of the Revolution walking to Washington, D.C. to beg for a pension, was the cause of the fire. The veteran was buried at the local cemetery, and it took several days to cart all of the dead horses down to the marshes where their carcasses could be sunk into the mud.

Bride rebuilt the inn, naming it the Phoenix Hotel in honor of it rising from the ashes. It had four large parlors on the first floor in addition to a dining hall that measured 58' by 28' and a bar that was 38' by 18'. The hall had a fenced off area for musicians. The second floor had six parlors and ten chambers, with a total of sixty guest rooms. It was a "stately edifice."

The Norfolk Advertiser called it "a splendid new house, not surpassed in size, fixtures, or elegance of finish, by any in all the villages of Massachusetts." It rivaled many of the finer hotels in Boston. The stable was built adjacent to the hotel again, but this time a brick wall served as a firestop between the two.

Another fire broke out in the stables around 2:00 a.m. on January 7, 1834, just 15 months later. This time, the stagecoach company had 53 horses in the stables, only one of which made it out alive. There were an additional 11 horses, owned by E. Newell, also in the barn. Ten of them made it out safely, but one broke its neck jumping out a window and died.

After the second fire, the stables were rebuilt further down Washington Street and away from the hotel. A third fire broke out on January 7, 1850, killing eight horses, two cows, and several pigs, in addition to carriages, harnesses, and other equipment. The hotel and other buildings in the area were emptied as a precaution, but the engine companies were able to keep the flames confined to the stable.

It finally burned to the ground on the morning of December 25, 1880.

=== Arrests of the arsonists ===
Around the time of the second fire, 70 or 80 horses owned by another stagecoach company were poisoned in a neighboring community, growing suspicions that the repeated fires were not accidental and might perhaps be related to the stagecoach companies. The Dedham Selectmen offered a $500 reward for the capture of the arsonist, and the Citizen's Stagecoach Company offered an additional $500.

John Wade, a resident at the competing Norfolk House, got drunk one evening and mentioned that he knew something about the fire. He was arrested within an hour but, after sobering up, refused to speak any more about it. A number of prominent residents visited him in jail, including Jeremy Stimson, and he eventually confessed that he had been hired by the owner of the Norfolk House to light the first fire.

Wade was tried for both arson and murder. He was represented by Theron Metcalf, who defended him by highlighting Wade's lack of intelligence and the fact that he was intoxicated when he confessed. Wade was found guilty and sentenced to death, but Rev. Ebenezer Burgess intervened on his behalf and helped get it commuted to life imprisonment.

The accused owner of the Norfolk House, which was a stop on the competing Tremont Stagecoach Line, committed suicide shortly after Wade named him. The proprietors of the two establishments generally stayed away from each other but "every once in a while they slipped and then there would be a short burst of newspaper venom."

Wade also knew George Walton, who was in prison for robbing Deacon Jabez Boyden of the Second Parish and who was later identified as the culprit in the second fire. (Note: Walton was defended by Horace Mann, who tried to place a reasonable doubt in the minds of the jury by pointing out that Boyden had previously identified someone else as the man who robbed him. Walton had immense physical strength. While in prison he was able to break free from the chains that kept him attached to the ground, jump the jailer who was bringing him a meal, and then run full speed up a set of stairs with the jailer on his back.) Walton was indicted, but he died of consumption before he could be tried.

== Rules of baseball ==
On May 13, 1858, members of the various town ball teams in the Boston area met at the Phoenix House to form the Massachusetts Association of Baseball Players. The nine team association included three teams from Boston and one from Dedham. (Note: One of the original ten teams to arrive that morning preferred the Knickerbocker Rules and so left the meeting.)

The association developed a set of rules that came to be known as the Massachusetts Game. There were no foul balls, four bases in a rectangular shape, and games lasted until one team had scored 100 runs. At the end of the day, after they adopted 17 rules, they broke to play a game that was well attended by residents.

== Later years ==
Under different names and different managers, the house continued to do a good business. John Howe (Note: Howe had several sons, including Edward and William Fisher, Dexter and Lemuel Howe and Allen.) and his wife owned the hotel from 1850 to 1879, during which time it became one of the community's leading social spots. One of the permanent residents of the hotel was William Ames, the son of Fisher Ames.

During the Civil War, it was commonly frequented by officers from nearby Camp Meigs. After that it gained a reputation as a spa, where people from the city might escape for a few days. One visitor described it as

...the old fashioned country hotel, not only for the summer, but for all-year-round; harboring the most extraordinary collection of oldish women and a few men whom the great whirlpool of the cites had left on this shore--gently bred, most of them, but with no particular object for existence.

Its last owner, Henry White, had owned it for only a year when it finally burned to the ground on the morning of December 25, 1880. (Note: White was also the jailkeeper at the nearby Norfolk County Jail.) The neighboring buildings were spared in part due to the recently fallen snow. It was the last tavern in Dedham at the time and, when it finally burned, Dedham's days of hosting stagecoach travelers ended.

== Works cited ==
- Hanson, Robert Brand (1976). Dedham, Massachusetts, 1635-1890. Dedham Historical Society.
- Parr, James L. (2009). Dedham: Historic and Heroic Tales From Shiretown. The History Press. ISBN 978-1-59629-750-0.
- Cook, Louis Atwood (1918). History of Norfolk County, Massachusetts, 1622-1918. S.J. Clarke publishing Company.
- Austin, Walter (1912). Tale of a Dedham Tavern: History of the Norfolk Hotel, Dedham, Massachusetts. Priv. print. at the Riverside Press.
- Clarke, Wm. Horatio (1903). Mid-Century Memories of Dedham. Dedham Historical Society.
