= Stolen Horse International =

USA organization for helping find lost or stolen horses

Stolen Horse International, Inc. (also known as SHI and NetPosse) is a 501(c)(3) non-profit organization founded to assist horse owners with recovering stolen horses. Their website states their mission is "to provide a comprehensive theft awareness program to all facets of the horse industry and offer educational opportunities for horse enthusiasts of all types and across all disciplines." The organization, which started in 1997, has broadened its reach in the equine community to missing, lost and found, and runaways.

== History ==
Stolen Horse International, Inc. was founded by Debi Metcalfe with the help of her husband Harold. Harold's mare, Idaho, was stolen September 26, 1997. After the recovery, Mrs. Metcalfe started Stolen Horse International, Inc., commonly known as NetPosse.com, to aid other owners with the recovery of their stolen horses.

== Activities ==
=== Stolen horses ===
The organization seeks primarily to aid in the search for stolen and missing horses. According to statistics, thousands of horses are stolen each year in the United States.

Horses constitute an easy source of cash for thieves. They can be quickly sold at saleyards, making it difficult to track the thief. Horses in areas that are not well supervised are at highest risk. Horses can also be stolen through civil theft such as bad leases, family or friend disputes, or through divorce. The more times they are resold, the harder it is to find a stolen horse. Thieves are only interested in a short-term profit and do not care about where the horse ends up.

=== Stolen tack and trailers ===
Stolen Horse International also aids owners in finding stolen equipment including tack and trailers. Tack is typically difficult to track, especially if not engraved with some identification number.

=== Missing owners ===
Stolen Horse International assists owners with recovering horses whose owners are unknown. The organization excepts some "civil thefts" since many horses disappear in this manner. Such events typically occur during natural disasters such as wildfires and hurricanes. They assisted with reuniting pet owners with their pets after Hurricane Katrina and other disasters.

=== Seeking justice ===
Stolen Horse International works closely with law enforcement personnel to aid in the apprehension of horse thieves, as well as search and recovery of horses. Many thieves have been apprehended after the group has assisted with the recovery of stolen horses.

== See also ==
- Horse theft
