= Dedham Institution for Savings =

American bank

Dedham Savings
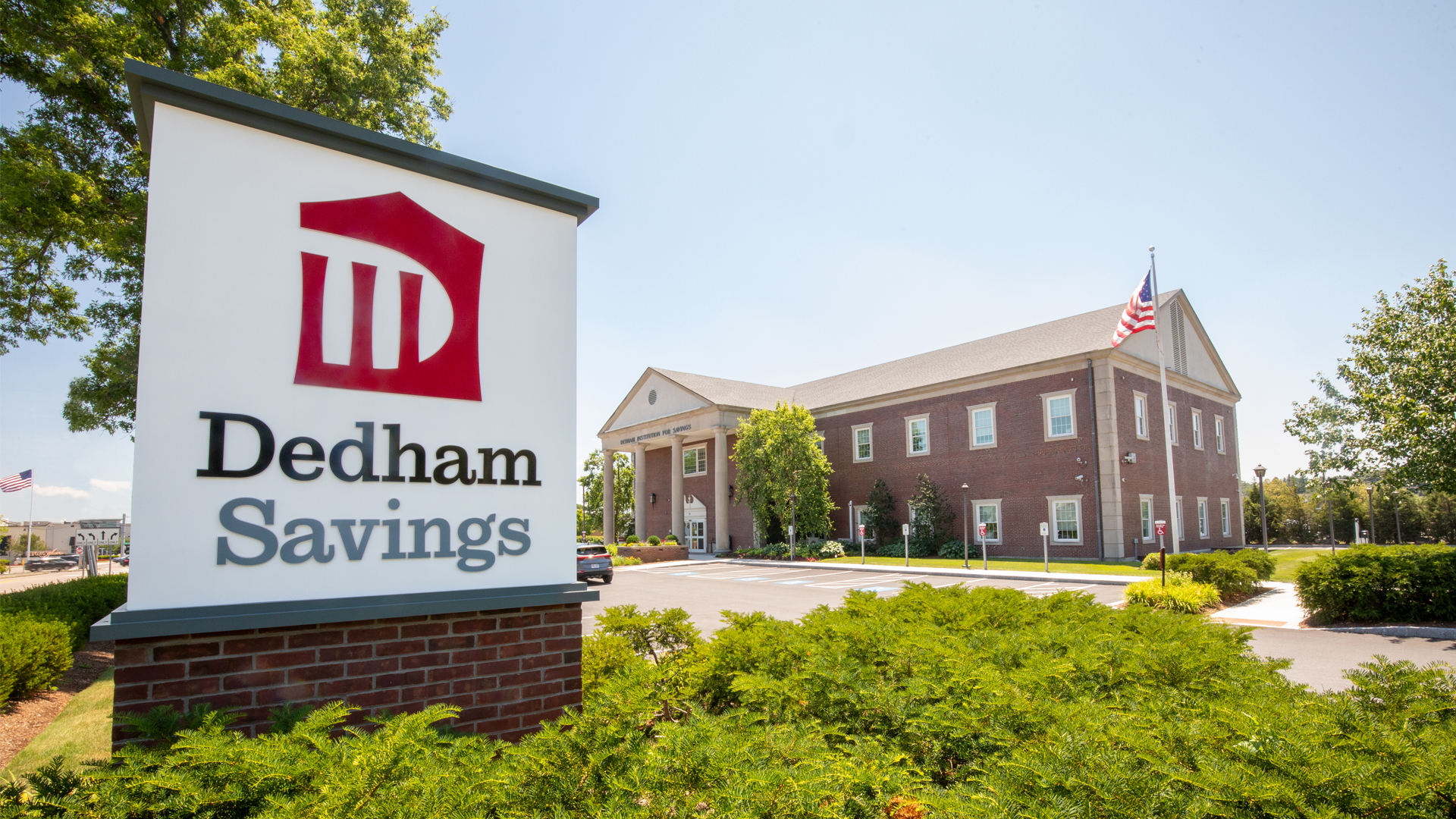
- Dedham Savings Main Office and headquarters building in Dedham, MA
- Company type: Mutual
- Industry: Financial services
- Founded: March 19, 1831; 195 years ago
- Headquarters: 55 Elm Street, Dedham, Massachusetts 02026, United States
- Number of locations: 10 full service branches
- Key people: Peter G. Brown (President and CEO)
- Services: Personal banking, business banking, mortgage lending, commercial lending, digital banking, cash management, investment services
- Net income: ▲US$14.212 million (2023)
- Total assets: ▲US$2.331 billion (2023)
- Total equity: ▲US$244.618 million (2023)
- Website: www.dedhamsavings.com

Dedham Savings is one of the oldest American banks still in operation and one of the oldest banks in the state of Massachusetts still doing business under its original charter.

It is owned by the holding company 1831 Bancorp, which also owns South Shore Bank in Boston.

Deposits at Dedham Savings are insured up to current limits of the Federal Deposit Insurance Corporation, which defines the institution as a community bank. The Depositors Insurance Fund insures all additional balances, up to any amount.

== History ==
Dedham Savings was incorporated in 1831.

Originally founded as Dedham Institution for Savings on March 19, 1831, the bank has connections to prominent individuals including Horace Mann. Sophia Foord, an acquaintance of Henry David Thoreau, was the bank's first depositor.

On May 4, 1832, The Society in Dedham for Apprehending Horse Thieves opened a bank account at Dedham Savings. This is the oldest active account at Dedham Savings and may be the oldest continuously active account in the United States.

The founder and first president of the bank was Ebenezer Burgess. An early secretary and treasurer of the bank was George Ellis II. (Note: Ellis lived on Court Street.) Calvin Guild was treasurer of the bank in the 1800s. (Note: Guild also was an officer of the Dedham Historical Society. He was the fifth of 10 children and descended from one of the original settlers of Dedham. For many years he was the manager of the Norfolk Manufacturing Company's mill on Mother Brook)

In 1832, one year after opening, the Bank's assets totaled nearly $30,000.

In 1942, just over 100 years after opening, assets were nearly $14 million.

In 2023, assets totaled over $2.3 billion.

=== Mutual Holding Company ===
On November 15, 2017, the Dedham Savings Board of Corporators, on the recommendation of the Bank's Trustees and Executive Management, voted to approve the formation of 1831 Bancorp, MHC. The mutuality of Dedham Savings remains intact but resides inside the mutual holding company, which is the sole owner of the now stock savings bank. This action received final regulatory approval in February 2018.

On January 1, 2024, 1831 Bancorp, the Mutual Holding Company parent of Dedham Dedham Savings, and Weymouth, Massachusetts-based South Shore Bancorp, the Mutual Holding Company parent of South Shore Bank, merged under the 1831 Bancorp, MHC name, which has been renamed to Charlesbridge, MHC. Both Dedham Savings and South Shore Bank operate as separately branded banking institutions under the combined holding company.

== Other banking services ==
Dedham Savings offers a range of financial and electronic banking services to individuals, businesses and organizations. In addition to an array of banking, lending, and commercial products, the bank began offering investment services in 1992. In 2011, Dedham Savings became a partial owner of Plimoth Trust Company, LLC, the parent company of Plimoth Investment Advisors, a portfolio management firm providing investment management, trust, retirement planning services and estate administration for both private and institutional clients.

== Headquarters & locations ==
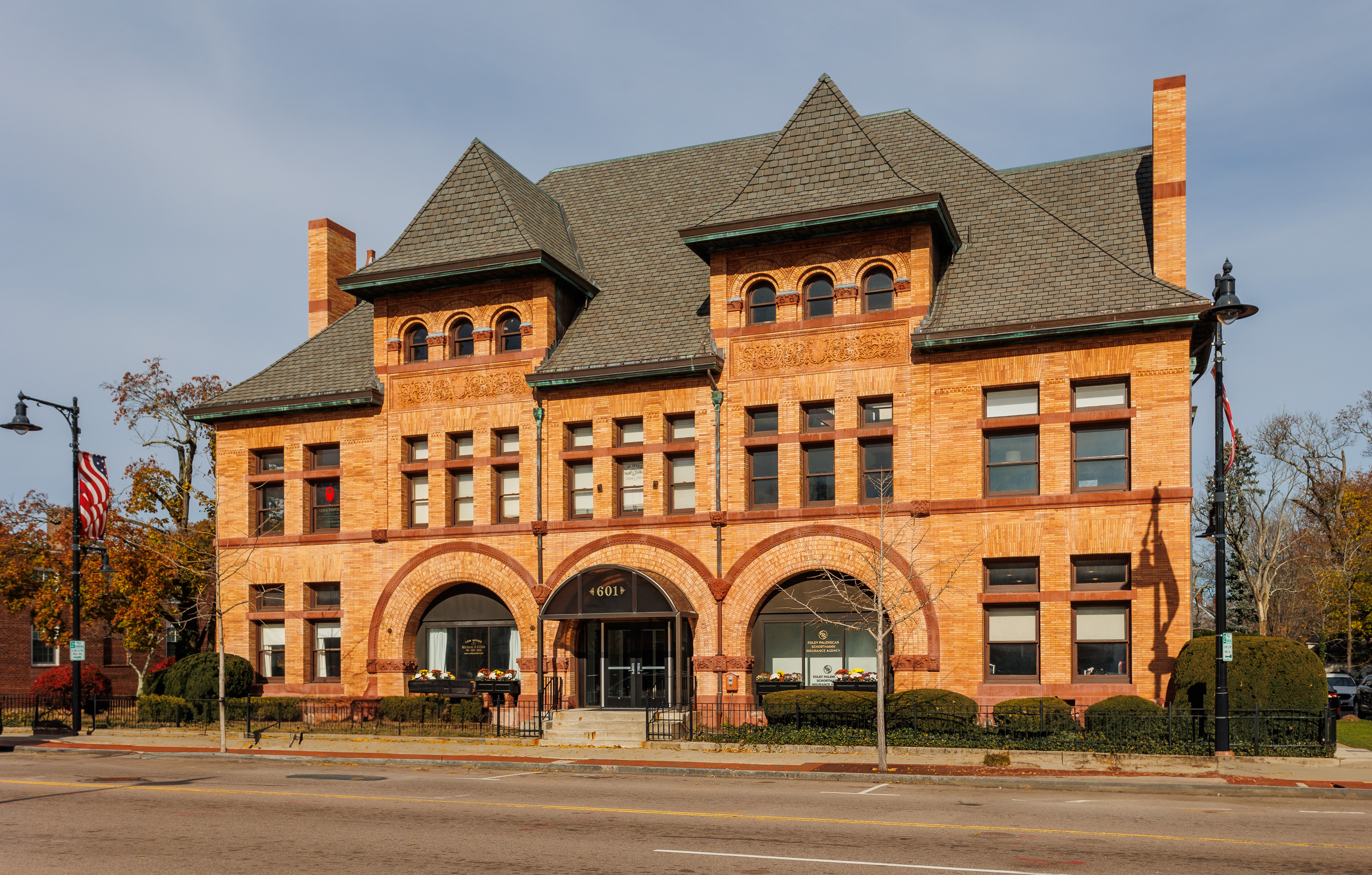
601-603 High Street

The bank was first opened in 1831 at the law office of Treasurer Jonathan H. Cobb at 18 Norfolk Street in Dedham. Three years later, it moved to the basement of the Norfolk County Courthouse. In 1847, it moved to the offices of the Norfolk Mutual Fire Insurance Company at 4 Pearl Street when that building was constructed. It remained there for over 40 years. In the summer of 1892, it opened in a new building the bank constructed at 601-603 High Street. The main branch later moved to 55 Elm Street when the bank built a new, larger building in 1976.

In 1950, the first branch opened in Westwood and the first branch in East Dedham was opened in 1969. Branches were opened in Walpole in 1987, Norwood in 1991, Sharon in 2003, and South Boston in 2016. In 2025, the bank opened its second office in Needham, bringing its total full-service offices to ten, as well as two Loan Offices. As of 2020, the bank also has four limited-service satellite branches inside local senior living facilities.

== Dedham Savings Community Foundation ==
The Dedham Savings Community Foundation is a privately funded foundation created by Dedham Savings in 2000 to provide financial support to charitable organizations that serve disadvantaged populations within the Bank's community reinvestment area. These communities include Dedham, Needham, Norwood, Sharon, South Boston, Walpole, and Westwood and contiguous areas. Typical requests are received from schools, libraries, family service organizations and non-profit organizations. The Trustees of the Foundation accept grant requests from community organizations and make awards twice per year.

== Works cited ==
- Clarke, Wm. Horatio (1903). Mid-Century Memories of Dedham. Dedham Historical Society.
- Neiswander, Judith (2024). Mother Brook and the Mills of East Dedham. Damianos Publishing. ISBN 978-1-941573-66-2.
