= Norfolk House (Dedham, Massachusetts) =

1801 building in Dedham, Massachusetts

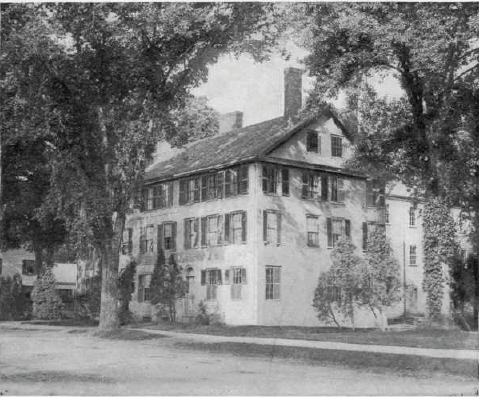
- Norfolk House at the turn of the 20th Century
- Interactive map of the Norfolk House area

General information
- Architectural style: Federal
- Location: 19 Court Street, Dedham, Massachusetts
- Coordinates: 42.2485°N 71.1772°W
- Construction started: 1802
- Completed: 2017

The Norfolk House also known as the Norfolk Hotel, was a tavern in Dedham, Massachusetts originally built in 1801 and located at 19 Court Street. It hosted John Quincy Adams, Andrew Jackson, and the Marquis de Lafayette.

== Martin Marsh ==
During the first few years of the 19th century, several turnpikes, including those linking Boston and Providence and Dedham and Hartford, were laid through Dedham. Inns and taverns sprung up along the new roads as more than 600 coaches would pass through Dedham each day on their way to Boston or Providence. As many as 40 coaches passed through town every day, and Dedham was the first stop on the way to Providence, or the last stop on the way to Boston.

In 1802, a local mason named Martin Marsh built his brick home at what is today 19 Court Street and was on the then-new new turnpikes. He saw the traffic flowing daily past his house and quickly turned his home into a tavern. He obtained a 999-year lease from First Church for the land on June 15, 1801, for $30 a year. (Note: Deacons Joseph Whiting, Aaron Fuller, and Isaac Bullard leased the land on behalf of the church.) His establishment, the Norfolk House, like the other inns and taverns in Dedham at that time, were bustling with the arrival of both the turnpikes and the courts.

The tavern was affiliated with the Tremont Stagecoach Line, which Marsh founded in 1814 with John Ellis. It left Dedham at 7 a.m. in the summer at 8:30 in the winter, Monday through Saturday, and stopped at Mr. Davenport's Tavern on Elm St., Boston. (Note: Elm St. was formerly Wing's Lane.) The afternoon trip left at 4:00. The Boston terminal later changed to Clark's Tavern in Brattle Square, Boston, later that year. A one way fare was 62.5 cents. It had a fierce competition with the nearby Phoenix Hotel's (Note: Located at the present day site of the Knights of Columbus building at the intersection on Washington and High Streets.) Citizen Stagecoach Line. (Note: All of the coaches for the Citizen Stagecoach Line were built in Dedham as well.)

The original portico of the house was the site of the first recorded traffic accident in Dedham. A runaway carriage crashed into the corner post and broke it. Citizens could also pay their taxes at the tavern. After a new Norfolk County Jail was built in 1817, the tools used in the project were auctioned off at the tavern.

== Gragg and Alden ==
Though he wanted to sell it as early as 1814, Marsh maintained the tavern until 1818, and then sold it to Moses Gragg and Francis Alden. (Note: Alden is described by Clarke as Capt. Francis Alden.) It was this partnership who renamed it as the Norfolk House and who hosted President Andrew Jackson for lunch as he and his entourage passed through town in 1832. The Norfolk House was also a hotbed for Republican politics in its day. It competed with the Democratic Phoenix House. The proprietors of the two establishments generally stayed away from each other but "every once in a while they slipped and then there would be a short burst of newspaper venom."

In 1820, three bays were added to the north of the building. In addition, another bay and a large ell were added to the rear, and the building gained a third story. The building had a stable and sheds associated with it.

In 1821, Alden left to run Timothy Gay's tavern on High Street and Gragg ran it alone. In 1828, Alden returned when Gragg went to Milton to open the Blue Hill Hotel. Under Alden, it became a popular social venue. He added an addition that included a third floor, spring loaded dancefloor in the ballroom that measured 68 feet long by 28 feet wide.

On May 24, 1822, a "learned elephant" was on display at the tavern. For 12.5 cents, spectators could watch the elephant stand on two legs, remove a cord and drink from a bottle, whistle, and take a bow. It could also pick up coins off the ground and deliver them to her handler.

On June 22, 1833, a few months after President Andrew Jackson Vice President Martin Van Buren were sworn in, they took a tour of New England. The president's carriage was pulled by four white horses and pulled into town around noon, where he received a 24-gun-salute. James Richardson, the president of the Norfolk Mutual Fire Insurance Company, gave a welcoming address. Jackson and Van Buren had lunch at the Norfolk House before continuing on to Boston.

== Martin Bates ==
In 1840, Martin Bates purchased the property. (Note: Martin Bates Street in Dedham was named for Bates.) He leased the property out to a variety of landlords who sometimes served alcohol and other times didn't with little regard for the liquor laws in place at the time. (Note: According to Clarke, the father of Samuel McIntire "kept the Norfolk House" in the mid-1800s.")

Bates sometimes kept a moose behind the property, and charged admission to see it. A Mr. Crossman co-owned the moose with Bates, and offered to buy Bates out. Bates failed to tell Crossman that the moose had a specialized diet, however, and the moose began losing weight and looking sickly. Crossman offered to sell the moose back to Bates, but Bates refused, saying the moose was too ill. Crossman then offered to simply give the moose back to Bates. This offer was accepted, the moose was fattened up again, and then sold to a circus. (Note: There were rumors that Bates sold the moose more than twice without disclosing the moose only ate certain types of foods, only to get it back again when the moose withered away.)

In 1863, the Norfolk House was the site of a grand ball thrown in honor of the 54th Massachusetts Infantry Regiment.

== Famous tenants and meetings ==
Horace Mann lived for several years at the Norfolk House in the early 1800s and opened a law office in December 1823.

The Norfolk House was also the site where "on June 4, 1810, in an expression of public outrage, a number of Dedham citizens assembled" and founded the Society in Dedham for Apprehending Horse Thieves. The Society met there annually for a number of years. Today the Society is one of the oldest continually existing horse thief apprehending organizations in the United States, and "one of Dedham's most venerable social organizations."

The hotel also hosted a number of political conventions, weddings, and other gatherings, as well as the annual meetings of the various fire engine and militia companies. The Dedham Bank held meetings there from 1814 to 1849.

The Norfolk House was the meeting place of the Constellation Lodge of Freemasons for many years. Both Mason, and his successors, Alden and Gragg, were Masons. A new Masonic Lodge was built in 1829.

== Closure ==
The railroad came to Dedham in 1836, and stagecoach traffic dwindled until it stopped all together in 1842. The temperance movement also put pressure on taverns, and the house ceased to be a tavern in 1866. Its final landlord was arrested for operating a public nuisance. By this time, and especially after an incident in which a group of Irish immigrants from Dedham and Roxbury got drunk and four people were stabbed, Bates was ready to sell the property.

Bates tried to sell it to the Town of Dedham, but the town was not interested. In a fit of spite, Bates then sold it to the Sisters of Charity to open St. Mary's School and Asylum, an orphanage and school for girls, for $1.

== Works cited ==
- Austin, Walter (1912). Tale of a Dedham Tavern: History of the Norfolk Hotel, Dedham, Massachusetts. Priv. print. at the Riverside Press.
- Clarke, Wm. Horatio (1903). Mid-Century Memories of Dedham. Dedham Historical Society.
- Hanson, Robert Brand (1976). Dedham, Massachusetts, 1635-1890. Dedham Historical Society.
- Parr, James L. (2009). Dedham: Historic and Heroic Tales From Shiretown. The History Press. ISBN 978-1-59629-750-0.
