= The Norfolk & Dedham Group =

American mutual insurance carrier

Norfolk & Dedham
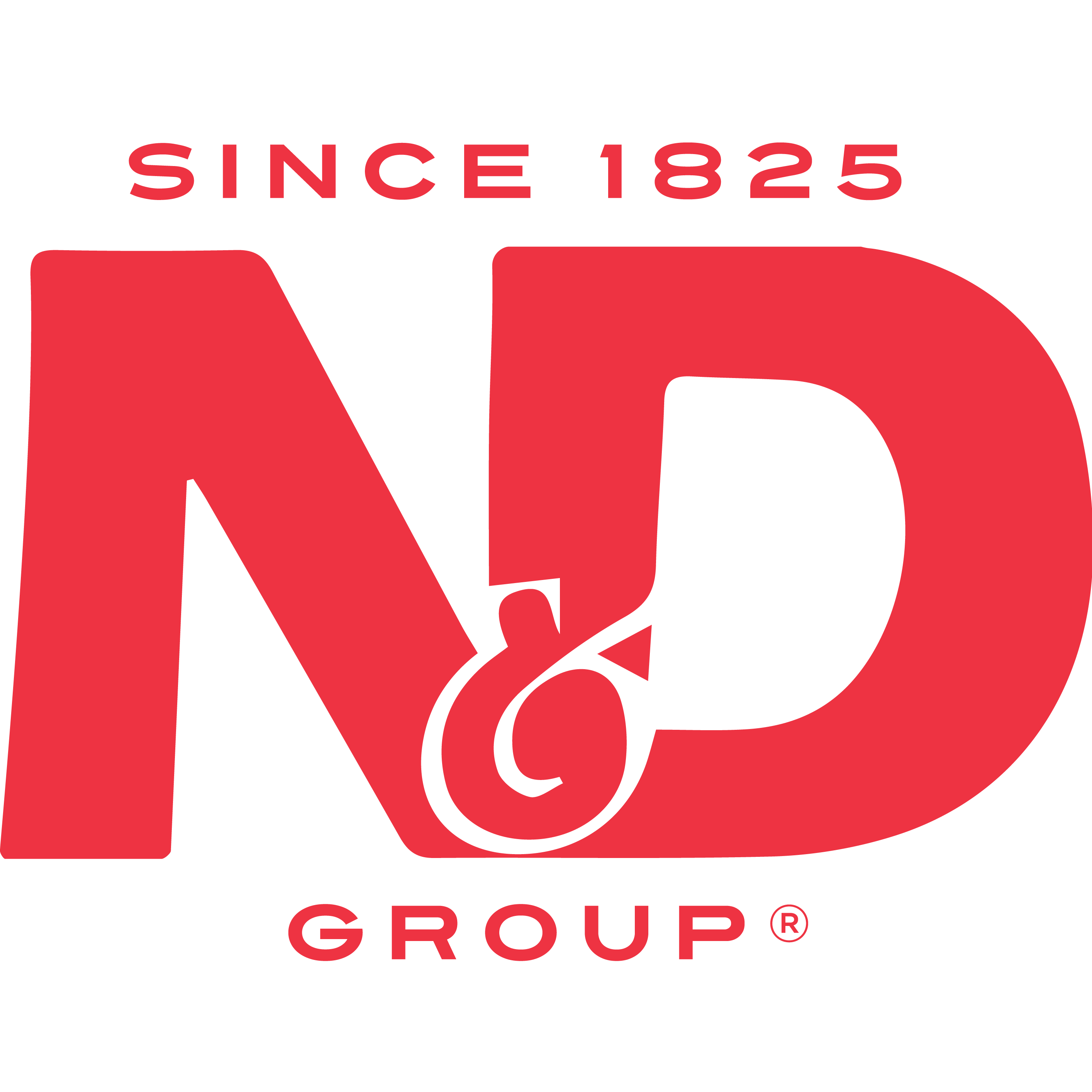
- Corporate logo

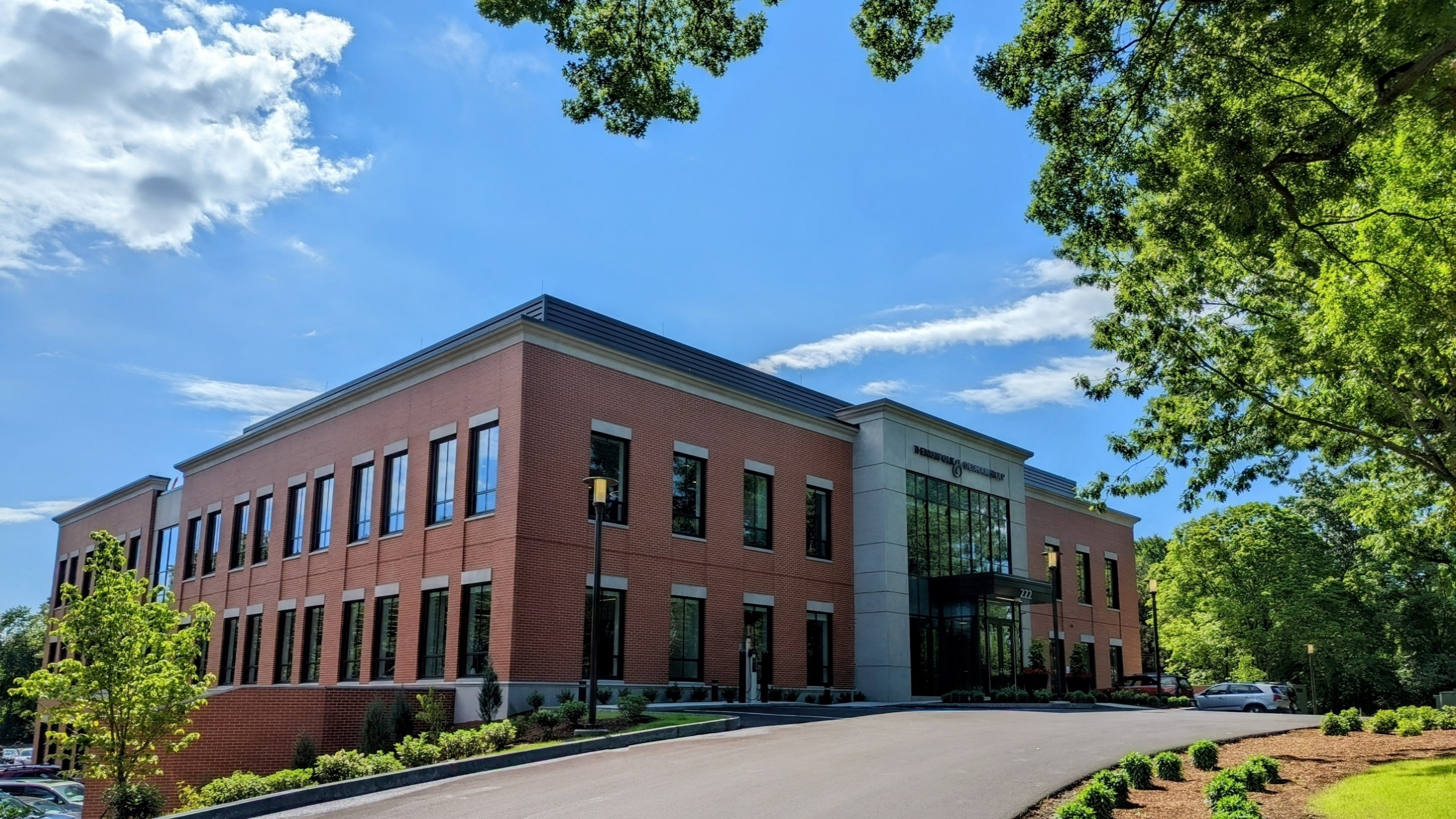
- Type: Mutual
- Industry: Insurance
- Founded: Dedham, Massachusetts, U.S. (1825)
- Founder: John Endicott
- Headquarters: Dedham, Massachusetts, U.S.
- Number of locations: 1
- Area served: New England, Mid Atlantic
- Key people: Joel Murray (President & CEO)
- Products: Personal insurance, Commercial insurance
- Total assets: ~$800 million (2020)
- Number of employees: ~150
- Divisions: Norfolk & Dedham Mutual Fire Insurance Company, Dorchester Mutual Insurance Company, Fitchburg Mutual Insurance Company
- Website: www.ndgroup.com

Norfolk & Dedham, and member of the N&D|Union Mutual Insurance Group, is a mutual insurance carrier based in Dedham, Massachusetts, comprising three regional property and casualty insurance companies which market personal and commercial insurance product lines through independent insurance agents. The group conducts business in Massachusetts, New Hampshire, and New Jersey, and writes over $400 million in Direct insurance premium. Founded as The Norfolk Mutual Fire Insurance Company in 1825, N&D is one of the oldest mutual insurance companies in the United States.

== History ==
As early Dedham, Massachusetts residents were establishing new farms and businesses, it became apparent that the community needed financial protection against various risks such as fire. As a result, The Norfolk Mutual Fire Insurance Company was established by a group of prominent citizens, electing John Endicott as the company's first president. In 1847, Norfolk built an office building at 4 Pearl Street in Dedham Square. For the next 40 years, the building also housed the Dedham Institution for Savings, the Dedham Bank, and served as a home for the Norfolk County grand jury.

Throughout the early to mid 1900s, the company quickly grew and expanded to various states in the Northeast. In the 1950s, doing business in 26 states, the group constructed its headquarters building at their current address along the Charles River. After catastrophic events such as Hurricane Andrew, N&D eventually retrenched on its core business and now focuses on general P&C insurance in Massachusetts, New Hampshire, and New Jersey. About 400 independent agencies sell Norfolk & Dedham insurance products. The company employs about 150 people and manages roughly $800 million in assets.

In 2020, the company announced it would be reconstructing its corporate headquarters in Dedham, with demolition of their building in the summer of 2020. The project, constructed on top of the footprint of the old building, was completed in June of 2022.

The companies that make up The Norfolk & Dedham Insurance Group are:

- Norfolk & Dedham Mutual Fire Insurance Company – Established 1825
- Fitchburg Mutual Insurance Company – Established 1847
- Dorchester Mutual Insurance Company – Established 1855

Norfolk & Dedham and Union Mutual of Montpelier, VT agreed to an affiliation on November 5, 2024, creating the N&D|Union Mutual Insurance Group.

== Charity and local service ==
Through The Norfolk & Dedham Foundation (established in 2017), N&D has supported over 50 local organizations, including Crossroads, the Dedham Community House, Boston Food Bank, Pine Street Inn and the Cristo Rey Network.

Throughout each year, the company conducts volunteer days in support of charitable organizations working locally to the areas the company services.

== Works cited ==
- Clarke, Wm. Horatio (1903). Mid-Century Memories of Dedham. Dedham Historical Society.
