= The Society in Dedham for Apprehending Horse Thieves =

Social organization in Massachusetts, US

This drawing appears on all membership certificates of the Society.

The Society in Dedham for Apprehending Horse Thieves is one of the "oldest continually existing horse thief apprehending organization in the United States, and one of Dedham's most venerable social organizations." Since its founding, there have been more than 10,000 members including heads of state, Supreme Court justices, governors, popes, professors, generals, and other notables.

At one time membership of the "ancient and well known society" was limited to "the pillars of society" and the "very flower and pick of the vigor, manhood and rising youth of the vicinity." It has also been said that "for sheer whimsy, the Society... is without peer." Today, it is a tax exempt non-profit social organization that continues to meet "just in case."

== History ==
=== Early years ===
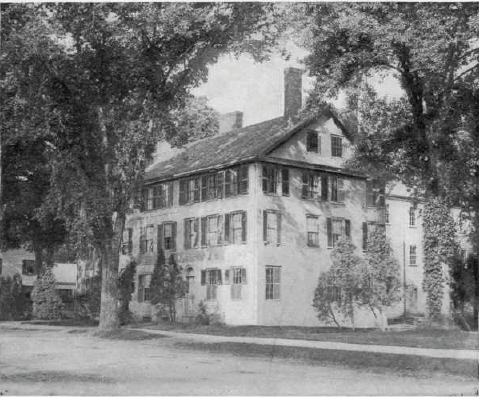
The Society was formed inside the Norfolk House, then known as Marsh's Tavern.

At the turn of the 19th century the citizens of Dedham, Massachusetts came together to combat the rash of horse theft that was afflicting their community. Similar societies were also created in Brookline, Roxbury, Newton, Milton, Needham, Medfield, and Milford.

At the time, "this posse of vigilantes was a real civic necessity," and during that time period at least 72 such organizations existed in New England. Thirteen men first met on June 4, 1810, at Marsh's Tavern at 19 Court Street and opened a subscription list, noting that

The great number of horses stolen from amongst us and in our vicinity is truly alarming, and calls for the attention of every well-disposed Citizen. It is evident that there has been, and probably will continue, a combination of Villains through the northern states to carry into effect this malignant design, and their frequent escape from the hand of justice stimulates them to that atrocious practice. And as that kind of property is most liable to be carried out of our knowledge, it requires the utmost exertion of every good member of society, to baffle and suppress depredations of this kind...

At this meeting, the following officers were chosen: William Ellis, Clerk, Nathaniel Whiting, President, General George Ellis, Vice President, and Eliphalet Baker, Treasurer. Captain Eliphalet Thorp, John Endicott, Joseph Swan Jr., Captain Jeremiah Baker, John Morse, Josiah Daniells, Moses Gay, and William Phipps were elected as the Committee of said Society. William Ellis Jr., Calvin Guild, Major Abner Ellis, Paul Ellis, John Guild, Obed Baker, Reuben Morse, John Fisher Jr., and Jason Messenger were elected as Riders for the Society.

Annual and special meetings were held at Marsh's Tavern until 1849, at which time they moved to the Phoenix Hotel. In 1814, the organization changed its name from the Detecting Society in Dedham to The Society in Dedham for Apprehending Horse Thieves.

On May 4, 1832, the Society opened a bank account at the Dedham Institution for Savings that remains open today and is the oldest active account at Dedham Savings; the bank says that the account "may be the oldest continuously active account in the United States."

In 1826, dues were $0.25. In 1906, they were $1.

=== Claims of being the oldest ===
As early as the 1880s, when many other societies were disbanding, members of the Dedham Society were claiming to be the oldest horse thief detecting society in the country. Milford's society was founded in 1795, however, making it the oldest. It disbanded in 1925.

For many years thereafter, the Dedham Society thought they were the oldest such society in the nation. When the Red Hook Society for the Apprehension and Detention of Horse Thieves sent them a letter in the 2010s announcing that they were 14 years older, however, Dedham's Lew Victor traveled to Red Hook to concede the point and attend their annual dinner.

== Membership ==
Anyone may be nominated for membership so long as the $10 membership fee is paid. Applications for membership in the Society must be approved by a majority vote by current members and a "controversial nomination years ago of Ayatollah Khamenei of Iran was not seconded." By 1960, the president of the Society reported that "memberships are as coveted as the Kentucky Colonels."

Membership was originally limited to residents of Dedham. After the society became a social organization in 1900, membership was expanded to included all Norfolk County residents in 1902 but capped at 350 members. This cap was later eliminated and by 1921 there were over 600 members. As of 2022, there were 10,709 members, with membership continuing after death.

Restrictions were loosened over the years to limit membership to residents of Norfolk County; or to residents of Norfolk and Suffolk Counties; or to persons resident within a 20-mile radius of the Norfolk County Courthouse; or to residents of Dedham, Norwood, Westwood, or Dover. Eventually all residency restrictions were lifted. The club's website claims that Robert Ripley of Ripley's Believe It or Not! fame had applied for membership before this restriction was eliminated, and the clerk-treasurer returned his application with a note rejecting his application.

Dear Mr. Ripley:

Since you are not a resident of Dedham (or Norwood, or Westwood, or Dover, or Norfolk County, of Suffolk County), you cannot join our Society.

Believe it or not,

Charles M. Gibson.

The person elected to membership in the society need not even know that they had been nominated. Robert Hanson, who has followed in the steps of his father and grandfather as clerk-treasurer of the Society, has said "I've always wondered what the reaction in the Vatican mail room is when they open the envelope and see the certificate." Former Massachusetts governor Michael Dukakis is a member, though when a reporter asked him he said he had never heard of the Society.

=== Notable members ===
- Ivan Boesky
- Louis D. Brandeis, member 640, joined 1903
- Michael Dukakis, member 5835, joined December 2, 1975
- Thomas Finneran, member 9254, joined December 2, 2003
- Arthur Foote, joined December 11, 1901
- Mikhail Gorbachev, member 7591, joined December 3, 1985
- Lyndon B. Johnson, member 4119, joined December 4, 1963
- Edward M. Kennedy, member number 4710, December 4, 1968
- John F. Kennedy, member number 3926, joined December 6, 1961
- John F. Kennedy Jr., member number 4247, joined December 2, 1964
- Pope John Paul II, member 6496, joined December 5, 1978
- Richard M. Nixon, member 4737, joined December 4, 1968
- David E. Osborne, member 10574, joined December 3, 2019
- Elvis Presley
- Ronald Reagan, member 6864, joined December 2, 1980

== Investigations and rescues ==
The Society has been called upon a few times and there is only one instance of a horse thief being caught by the Society. Memberships dues were used to cover the expenses of the Society, including rewards, printing of fliers, and newspaper advertisements.

By 1906, with the advent of the automobile, the world, and the Society, were changing, prompting the Boston Herald to run the following Dedham Dittie:

It was not like that in the olden says in dear old Dedham town,

In the limping, scrimping olden days, when they ran a horse thief down.

Then each man rode off on his fastest horse, and he rode both fast and far,

But now the rider hunts the thief in a chugging motor car.

The last time the Society investigated a horse theft was in 1909, although a number of pranks between members set off false alarms after that. In days when vigilante justice was a major component of the Society, "not a few horse thieves were apprehended by the organization of the long name."

=== 1822 Mason Richard's Store theft ===
A dark bay horse was stolen from Mason Richard's Store on December 17, 1822. Anyone who returned the horse would receive a reward of $5, and anyone who caught the thief would also receive $5.

=== 1826 Farrington investigation ===
In 1826, a member of the Farrigton family, a prominent Dedham family, reported his horse stolen. The horse was later found by the side of the road in Natick. Because it was not stolen, Farrington was required to reimburse the Society for the costs of the investigation.

=== 1840 Fisher theft ===
John Fisher's horse was stolen in 1840. A group of riders headed south on the Providence Road, and found evidence that the horse had bucked the thief off its back and into the mud. The thief got away.

=== 1904 Broad Oaks theft ===
In 1904, a horse and buggy were stolen from Broad Oak and the Society was called into action.

=== 1906 Scarry's Stable theft ===
In 1906 an animal was stolen from Scarry's Livery Stable on Eastern Avenue. The alarm was raised, fliers were distributed, and members set off in motor cars, but they failed to find the stolen horse. While by this time the Town of Dedham had a professional police force responsible for tracking down the thief, at one point the chief of police was reporting to the Society.

The clerk of the society reported at the annual meeting that though the animal was not recovered, it was not for a lack of trying: "It is only fair to the Riders of this Society to state that the owner of the horse even consulted mediums in his efforts to find the horse. This only proves that our Riders did their full duty, as the horse could not be found." It was rumored that the thief was from Rhode Island.

Four years later, in December 1910, Joseph Agel of Boston brought a short, chunky, nervous horse that was blind in one eye to the Scarry Stable. Scarry's widow claimed that the horse was the same that had been stolen in 1906 and both sides called the police. The matter was later settled in a Dedham courtroom.

== Proposed switch to automobiles ==
By 1915, it was said that "without doubt" the organization's existence scared away potential horse thieves, as evidenced by the decreasing number of thefts of horses and increasing number of automobile thefts. President George F. Joyce proposed changing the purpose of the organization to those who steal automobiles and auto parts. In 1921 and 1924 the Society was still debating whether to turn its attention to car thieves. In 1925 no horses were stolen, but a cow was recovered.

In 1932, it was proposed that a Society in Dedham for Apprehending Hit-and-Run Drivers would be a good successor organization. It was also predicted that by 2032, when human flight would be common, that there would be a Society for Apprehending Reckless Aviators over Dedham. A newspaper in West Virginia once suggested that the Society not only turn its attention to catching auto thieves, but anarchists as well.

== Move to a social organization ==
By 1899, horse thefts were becoming so rare that newspapers as far away as The Evening Times of Washington, D.C. were noting that "it might seem to the ordinary observer that the members ought to devote themselves to something worth doing, now that their particular object in life has disappeared." However, in 1931 it was said that "Dedham doesn't purpose to let an old tradition languish simply for lack of horse thieves."

At the turn of the 20th century, under the guidance of its new president, Dr. Edward Knobel, its annual meeting became a social event with dinner, drink, and entertainment. In 1900, the membership voted to make each annual meeting a social affair with a banquet.

Elbert Hubbard was the keynote speaker at the annual dinner in 1908. He spoke on the poetry of Robert Browning and said "a more refined and intelligent audience I never saw." He reported that the membership was limited to 350 men and that there was a perpetual waiting list to join with "the slightest fleck on your social record" being cause to be rejected.

The organization met in a variety of taverns and other public buildings around town throughout the years. In 1893 the annual meeting was held at the Grand Army of the Republic hall in Dedham Square, and in the early 1900s the organization met at Greenleaf Hall. (Note: At least in 1903, 1907, and 1911.) For at least one year, in 1919, the Society met at the Boston City Club. By 1920, and as late as 1956, it met at Memorial Hall. Eventually the meetings moved to the old high school around the time of the First World War and then to the current high school when it was constructed in the 1960s. While alcohol was forbidden in the schools, it was a convenient setup with both a cafeteria and an auditorium, and surprise was expressed yearly at the variety of colors of "water" in glasses. Attendance steadily increased at the annual meeting and beginning in the 1970s the organization met at Moseley's on the Charles.

In the early 1900s, the committee of Riders were elected based on their weight, "so that when a thief is captured his captors can sit on him to prevent him from escaping." Riders were required to weigh at least 200 pounds. Ralph Cheever, who weighed 350 pounds and was president from 1919 to 1920, frequently served as a rider.

The organization represented New England at the 1964 New York World's Fair. Today, donations are occasionally made to local charitable organizations. The first such donation was a $25 gift to the Dedham Emergency Nursing Association in 1902.

== 21st century ==
The annual meeting of the Society takes place on the first Tuesday of December each year. At the 192nd annual meeting in 2002 "more than 200 proud members... toasted their success last night at their annual meeting, a bacchanalian affair featuring bad jokes, old-time music, a generous amount of both spirit and spirits and a virtual who's who of political and business life." In 2007 members came from as far away as California, just to attend the dinner.

One member, whose "hulking frame could barely contain his enthusiasm for the group," told a reporter that the annual meeting was "the greatest event in the history of Dedham, ever. And the best part is, it has no redeeming value whatsoever, except for pointless fun and unbelievable camaraderie." In recent decades, the dinner has always been roast beef. Some years, photos of horses are brought in "to acquaint riders who may never have seen one before."

For many years it was a men's only club, but in 2012 Margo Pyle became the Society's first female Rider, or one who is responsible for searching for horse thieves when one is stolen. Being elected a Rider is "a position of signal honor." There are between five and 10 Riders elected at each annual meeting, with each elected Rider receiving a badge. Each Rider must take an oath whereby they swear to ride out and apprehend any thieves.

In 2020, when a horse named Leo went missing in Bear Brook State Park in New Hampshire, Clerk-Treasurer Kevin Hampe was contacted asking if the Society would help look for it. Hampe initially thought the call was a joke, but eventually informed the caller that the Society's jurisdiction is limited to within 20 miles of the Norfolk County Courthouse.

== Offshoot organizations ==
While many similar private anti-theft organizations existed at the time the Society was founded, there have been at least two organizations inspired by the Society directly. In 1841, 42 of 76 original members began a new organization, the Society in Dedham for Apprehending and Prosecuting Thieves. The Society in Hampton Beach for the Apprehension of Those Falsely Accusing Eunice (Goody) Cole of Having Familiarity with the Devil was formed in 1936 in direct response to learning about the Society in Dedham.

The Horse Thieves Tavern at the corner of Washington and High Streets in Dedham Square also took its name from the Society, and was open from 2018 to 2024.

== See also ==
- Bentonville Anti-Horse Thief Society
- Red Hook Society for the Apprehension and Detention of Horse Thieves

== Works cited ==
- Austin, Walter (1912). Tale of a Dedham Tavern: History of the Norfolk Hotel, Dedham, Massachusetts. Priv. print. at the Riverside Press.
- Parr, James L. (2009). Dedham: Historic and Heroic Tales From Shiretown. The History Press. ISBN 978-1-59629-750-0.
