= The Baseball Encyclopedia =

Baseball reference book

- Slipcover and side portion of the first edition (1969)
- Language: English
- Subject: Baseball
- Publisher: Macmillan
- Publication date: 1969–1996
- Publication place: United States
- Pages: 2,337 (1st edition, 1969)
- ISBN: 978-0-02-860815-0

The Baseball Encyclopedia is a baseball reference book first published by Macmillan in 1969. Nine further editions of the book were released between 1974 and 1996. The Baseball Encyclopedia features statistical summaries for Major League Baseball (MLB) players.

== Background ==
Baseball reference books that predate The Baseball Encyclopedia include the Baseball Cyclopedia, which was first released in 1922, and The Official Encyclopedia of Baseball, which was published during the 1950s and 1960s. These books included rudimentary player statistics, but major gaps existed in their coverage. Games played were tallied for all players, while batting average was provided for hitters and pitchers' win–loss records were listed. Other statistical categories were not provided by these books. Official baseball records and various publications had numerous errors and inconsistencies, which were most apparent with pre-1920 data. One publication by The Sporting News listed two different 1899 National League batting average leaders within a 16-page span.

By the mid-1960s, advances in computer technology allowed for a level of data collection that would support a project aimed at producing an accurate and comprehensive record book for MLB. Statistician David Neft, who had recently been hired by computer data processing company Information Concepts, Inc. (ICI), first proposed a new baseball encyclopedia in 1965. Two years later, he pitched the idea to Bob Markel, Macmillan's executive editor. Markel, a baseball fan, liked the concept and eventually Macmillan bought rights to The Baseball Encyclopedia, despite concerns by company president Jeremiah Kaplan about the proposed $25 price of the book. Neft assumed the role of editor-in-chief.

== First edition ==
=== Research and development ===
In 1965, Neft sought out research assistance by putting help wanted ads in The Sporting News, which yielded four assistants. It was eventually determined that, to provide the greatest amount of accuracy possible, daily statistics for all players would have to be recreated. ICI sought to use box score information from MLB games played since 1876 to create a statistical database, which would be utilized in making files for all players and managers. Biographical details for approximately 5,000 players had already been compiled by Lee Allen, a historian at the Baseball Hall of Fame, and his research provided an early foundation. Another boon to research efforts for the book came from ICI's acquisition of scrapbooks owned by steamship executive John Tattersall. His records included a full collection of box scores dating back to 1876, and a mostly complete daily statistics log that covered the period between 1876 and 1890.

The data, however, was not sufficient to calculate stats that had not been tracked contemporaneously, such as earned run average, runs batted in, and saves. To permit these categories to be deduced for each season, Neft's research team consulted newspaper accounts of old games, focusing on the 1876–1919 period. The research team ultimately expanded to 21 people, who went to libraries throughout the U.S. to obtain the needed information. This process took two years to complete.

The Baseball Encyclopedia was an early example of computer software being used in the book publication process. Author Alan Schwarz credits it as the first book with computer typesetting (excluding phone books). Every player's data were individually compiled on sheets of paper, with the information coded into punch cards by a firm in Israel. Once the cards came back from overseas, ICI placed them in magnetic tape and data was sorted by an IBM 360 computer. The system allowed for teams' season statistics to be totaled, combined, and compared with the numbers kept by the leagues; inconsistencies were flagged by the computer and logged by Neft for investigation.

Among the issues resolved was the existence of a small number of phantom ballplayers who had been recorded in box scores as appearing in a game despite not existing. One example was a Cleveland Blues player named Woodruff, who was credited with playing as a right fielder in a 1901 game. The player was actually Bob Wood, who was normally a catcher but made infrequent appearances as an outfielder; a telegraph operator incorrectly interpreted Morse code that read "Wood rf", leading to an error in the box score. An ad in The Sporting News claimed that The Baseball Encyclopedia took three-and-a-half years to research and develop, and that it cost $1.5 million to produce. Neft remarked that the book "took seven hours to print ... but a year and a half to tell the computer what to do."

==== Adjustments to historical stats ====
Before the book's release, a five-person Special Baseball Records Committee was formed by MLB. This group had multiple meetings and discussed proposed corrections to players' stats, in addition to deciding how old rules would be interpreted. It also addressed the scope of which past leagues would be granted "major league" status. It ruled that 19th-century and modern major league records would be treated as part of a single set of records "without arbitrary division", but that the National Association of Professional Base Ball Players (NAPBBP), the dominant league from 1871 to 1875, would not be called a major league "due to its erratic scheduling and procedures."

One issue the committee dealt with was the treatment of walks in the 1876 and 1887 seasons. In the former year they had been officially recorded as outs, and they had been ruled as base hits in 1887. The group opted against the original interpretations, electing to use modern rules, under which walks did not count as hits or outs. Cap Anson was one player whose statistical record was affected by this change. Having previously been listed with nearly 3,500 lifetime hits, he lost 60 hits from walks during the 1887 season and 423 pre-1876 hits, which were not counted by The Baseball Encyclopedia. These changes left Anson five hits short of the 3,000 hit club, according to the book. Ty Cobb, who held MLB's career record for base hits at the time, had his total adjusted upward from 4,191 hits to 4,192. Among pitchers whose records were changed, Christy Mathewson, who had been tied for the most career wins by an NL pitcher with Grover Cleveland Alexander, had a reduction of six wins. Walter Johnson also had his win total lowered.

Attracting more attention than those changes was a rule interpretation that would have altered a well-known record: Babe Ruth's total of 714 career home runs. In a 1918 game, Ruth had a game-ending hit which would have been scored as a home run under modern rules, as the ball went over the outfield wall. Because there was a runner on base who had advanced three bases, Ruth was given a triple. Thirty-seven hits that would have counted as home runs under modern scoring guidelines, including Ruth's, were discovered by the researchers for The Baseball Encyclopedia. The record committee initially voted to credit the batters with home runs, which would have increased Ruth's career tally to 715.

The decision brought a negative fan reaction and controversy in the press. Journalist Robert Lipsyte cited the change as an example of "historical revisionism" and nicknamed the researchers the "Revisionist Police". Another critic was MLB public relations director Joe Reichler, a member of the committee who had been absent from the meeting where the home run ruling was voted upon. Reichler said that changing historical regulations was not meant to be within the committee's remit. He successfully pushed for a second vote on the topic and persuaded two other committee members to oppose the measure. By a 3–2 vote, the change was overturned, leaving Ruth with 714 home runs.

=== Contents ===
Close to 75% of the first edition was devoted to statistical records of MLB players. Over 10,000 players had their stats included in The Baseball Encyclopedia, with coverage dating to 1876. Pitchers had 19 different categories of statistics, while batters had 17. Seven of the pitchers' categories specifically covered relievers, and position players received a summary of games played by defensive position. NAPBBP participants also had stat registers, as did MLB managers.

Other portions of The Baseball Encyclopedia included a section on baseball history and a listing of stat category leaders, which had single-season and career figures. Summaries and line scores were provided for all World Series contests and MLB All-Star Games. Another section, titled "The Teams and Their Players", had seasonal team rosters and stats, along with league standings and stat category leaders, for each year starting in 1876. Overall, the contents of The Baseball Encyclopedia's first edition totaled 2,337 pages; the book had a weight of six-and-a-half pounds.

=== Release and reception ===
The first edition of The Baseball Encyclopedia was publicly unveiled at a New York City press conference on August 28, 1969, and released on September 10. Even at the $25 price point, it gained an audience, with sales of over 100,000 copies. The book attracted a mostly positive reception from reviewers as well. The Baseball Encyclopedia received three separate reviews in The New York Times, by Jimmy Breslin, Christopher Lehmann-Haupt, and Leonard Koppett. Lehmann-Haupt described The Baseball Encyclopedia as "Big for a book, small for an amusement park." The large size of the book was a subject of discussion, as it was nicknamed "Big Mac". Breslin offered praise for the attention the book paid to lesser-known players. More critical reviews focused on the changes made to the stats of historical players. In Sports Illustrated, sportswriter Robert Creamer called the adjustment of Mathewson's win total "illogical, historically invalid, and personally upsetting to Christy Mathewson fans." However, historian John Thorn later called the first edition of The Baseball Encyclopedia the best version.

== Subsequent editions ==
Five years later, in 1974, the second edition of The Baseball Encyclopedia was published. This release included statistics that had been updated through the 1973 season. However, it was reduced in size by more than 800 pages. This was accomplished by excluding statistical summaries for all retired batters with fewer than 25 at bats, and all retired pitchers with under 25 innings pitched and no wins or losses. A new editor was required as Neft had stopped working for ICI. Reichler was hired by Macmillan for the position; Schwarz saw him as wanting to "please his bosses at MLB", who were dissatisfied with the changes to player statistics that had been incorporated into the first edition.

For the 1974 version, Reichler reversed many of the previous changes. Schwarz noted a pattern in which adjustments that would result in additions to the stats of big-name players were made, but not those that required subtractions. This process continued in later editions, making the book less accurate. Sports Illustrated's Jonathan Yardley criticized the second edition for its size reduction, suggesting that updated player stats should have been released in a supplement to the original book.

Starting in 1976, new editions of the Baseball Encyclopedia were released every three years for the next several versions. By 1982, when the fifth edition came out, sales had surpassed 250,000. Jeff Neumann, one of the book's editors, later said that editions consistently sold 50,000 copies while he was involved with The Baseball Encyclopedia's production, and that it was "a very profitable enterprise" for Macmillan. Aiding the publisher was an agreement it had made with the researchers before the original book was released, which allowed Macmillan to avoid making any royalty payments. Eventually, ICI went under and Macmillan gained full ownership of The Baseball Encyclopedia.

After the release of the 1988 edition of The Baseball Encyclopedia, Reichler died and was succeeded by Rick Wolff. In 1990, the eighth edition came out. Along with updates that brought the number of MLB players covered to more than 13,000, six fielding statistics were newly added to players' summaries, which necessitated the use of larger pages. A directory with information for over 130 Negro league players active from 1920 to 1950 was also included, as was information on teams' home and away records and streaks. For this version, Wolff elected to rely heavily on the database from the first edition, rejecting adjustments made under Reichler that were not backed by firm proof. Numerous changes were made to historical statistics; among them was reducing Honus Wagner's career hit total by 12, which was enough to cost him two percentage points from his career batting average and drop him one place on the all-time hit list. Media members were strongly critical of the edits. Jerome Holtzman of the Chicago Tribune said they were "tampering with baseball's most sacred text." Schwarz later disagreed with Holtzman's viewpoint, saying that Reichler had been responsible for adjustments before the press had paid attention. Regardless, the changes were noticed by MLB, which decided to no longer officially endorse The Baseball Encyclopedia.

Three years later, the non-endorsed ninth edition was published. The All-American Girls Professional Baseball League was given a section in the book, a first for The Baseball Encyclopedia. With the advent of the Internet, the need for baseball reference books diminished. The final version of The Baseball Encyclopedia, the 10th, came out in 1996. Jeanine Bucek was the lead editor of that edition. IDG Books purchased the book's rights from Simon & Schuster, which had bought Macmillan. Wiley & Sons later obtained the rights from IDG, but no new editions were produced.

== Legacy ==
The Baseball Encyclopedia was an influential publication in the field of baseball statistics. Shortly after the release of the first edition, the Society for American Baseball Research was founded. The research done for the books was reflected in future compilations of stats. The first edition of The Baseball Encyclopedia served as a template which fellow encyclopedia Total Baseball was based upon. Various editions of that book were published between 1989 and 2004. Thorn has stated that he considers the websites Baseball-Reference.com and Retrosheet "descendants of The Baseball Encyclopedia". Sean Forman, the founder of Baseball-Reference.com, called it as an inspiration for the site's development, saying that the objective was "making the pages connectable." Neft cited the encyclopedia as having an effect in publicizing the statistical achievements of players like Addie Joss and Sam Thompson to Hall of Fame voters. In 2002, Sports Illustrated selected The Baseball Encyclopedia as one of the 100 greatest sports books.

== Bibliography ==
- Hensler, Paul (2017). The New Boys of Summer: Baseball's Radical Transformation in the Late Sixties. Rowman & Littlefield. ISBN 978-1-5381-0259-6.
- Schwarz, Alan (2004). The Numbers Game: Baseball's Lifelong Fascination with Statistics. Thomas Dunne Books. ISBN 978-0-312-32223-6.
