= Total Sports Publishing =

Total Sports Publishing refers to a book publishing company based in Kingston, New York, that operated from 1998 to 2002. Prominent author John Thorn served as the division's publisher throughout its existence.

== Total Sports ==
Thorn and Michael Gershman had been packaging books for other publishers since the late 1980s, most notably their baseball encyclopedia, Total Baseball. Thorn and Gershman called their company "Baseball Ink."

The pair joined forces with internet news company KOZ, Inc. to form Total Sports in 1998. The new company was headquartered in Raleigh, North Carolina, and led by George Schlukbier. Thorn's publishing division took root in his hometown of Kingston, New York, while Gershman headed the company's Manhattan office on Park Avenue.

This merger proved to be an ill-fated arrangement. The burst of the dot-com bubble led the two companies to split after less than two years. Thorn led a management buyout of the publishing division during the summer of 2000. The Raleigh-based web business was purchased by the San Francisco-based internet company Quokka Sports.

Both Thorn's new venture and Quokka Sports would declare bankruptcy by 2002.

== Staff ==
TSP's editorial staff included most of the prominent sports reference editors of the era, including Thorn, David Pietrusza, Pete Palmer, Bob Carroll, Gary Gillette, Sean Lahman, Dan Diamond, Mike Meserole, Beau Riffenburgh, Kenneth Shouler and Matthew Silverman.

== Encyclopedias ==
TSP was best known for its massive sports encyclopedias, each generally more than 2000 pages, such as Total Baseball, Total Football, and Total Hockey. These volumes were updated at regular intervals, and bore the official endorsements of the leagues whose history they covered: Major League Baseball, the National Football League, or the National Hockey League. These books were universally hailed as a quantum leap in the sports reference genre.

== Total Sports Illustrated ==
An alliance with Sports Illustrated created the "Total/Sports Illustrated" imprint, which published best sellers such as Don Zimmer's autobiography as well as books by magazine staff writers such as Rick Reilly and Peter King.

The TSI line was also renowned for its "Classics" series, which reprinted great books by well-known authors, including Frank Deford, Leonard Koppett, Lawrence Ritter, Robert Creamer, W. C. Heinz, Peter Gent and Lee Allen.

== A Life in Pictures series ==
Another hallmark of the company was pictorial autobiographies of legendary athletes, including Henry Aaron (with Dick Schaap), Ted Williams (with David Pietrusza) and Wayne Gretzky (with John Davidson). Each book contained pictures documenting the life of the subject, many of which came from their own personal collection. Books in this series bore the subtitle "A Life in Pictures."

== Books published ==
- Arenafootball 2 Official Record and Fact Book 2001
- The Babe: The Game That Ruth Built (Lawrence Ritter and Mark Rucker
- Baseball: The Biographical Encyclopedia (Matthew Silverman, Michael Gershman, David Pietrusza)
- Coach K's Little Blue Book: Fire, Fact and Insight from College Basketball's Best Coach (Mike Krzyzewski, Barry Jacobs)
- The Commissioners: : Baseball's Midlife Crisis (Jerome Holtzman)
- Coolest Game on the Road: A Travel Guide to NHL (Mike Brehm, Mark Paddock)
- East Side, West Side: Tales of New York Sporting Life, 1910-1960 (Lawrence Ritter)
- Gladiators: 40 Years of Football (Walter Iooss, Roy Blount, Jr.)
- Greatest Athletes of the 20th Century (Tim Crothers, John Garrity)
- Greatest Quarterbacks (Peter King)
- Havana Heat: A Novel (Darryl Brock)
- The Hidden Game of Football: The Next Edition (Bob Carroll, Pete Palmer, John Thorn, David Pietrusza)
- Home Run: My Life in Pictures (Hank Aaron with Dick Schaap)
- The Hot Stove League (reprint) (Lee Allen)
- The Insider 2000 (USA Today Baseball Weekly the Insider) (Gary Gillette, et al.)
- Life of Reilly (Rick Reilly)
- McGoorty: A Pool Room Hustler (Danny McGoorty, Robert Byrne)
- The National Hockey League Official Guide and Record Book 2002 (Dan Diamond)
- 99: My Life in Pictures (Wayne Gretzky, John Davidson and Dan Diamond)
- No More Bad Shots: Shot by Shot, Round by Round - A Foolproof Guide to Better Golf (Hank Haney, John Huggan)
- North Dallas Forty (reprint) (Peter Gent)
- Now Pitching for the Yankees: Spinning the News for Mickey, Billy and George (Martin Appel)
- Smoke: The Romance and Lore of Cuban Baseball (Mark Rucker, Peter C. Bjarkman)
- The Spy: Baseball '98 (Gary Gillette, Stuart Shea)
- Ted Williams: My Life in Pictures (Ted Williams with David Pietrusza)
- They Said It: 200 Of the Funniest Sports Quips & Quotes Collected from the Pages of Sports Illustrated (David Fischer)
- The Thinking Fan's Guide to Baseball 3rd Ed. (Leonard Koppett)
- Total Baseball: The Official Encyclopedia of Major League Baseball (John Thorn, Pete Palmer, Michael Gershman, David Pietrusza)
- The Total Baseball Catalog (David Pietrusza, Lloyd Johnson, Bob Carroll)
- Total Browns (Bob Carroll, Michael Gershman, David Neft, David Pietrusza, Beau Riffenburgh, Matthew Silverman, John Thorn)
- Total Browns: The Official Encyclopedia of the Cleveland Browns (Bob Carroll, et al.)
- Total Football (Bob Carroll, Michael Gershman, David Neft, John Thorn)
- Total 49ers (Bob Carroll, Michael Gershman, David Neft, David Pietrusza, Beau Riffenburgh, Matthew Silverman, John Thorn)
- Total Hockey: The Official Encyclopedia of the National Hockey League (Dan Diamond et al.)
- Total Packers (Bob Carroll, Michael Gershman, David Neft, David Pietrusza, Beau Riffenburgh, Matthew Silverman, John Thorn)
- Total Quarterbacks (Bob Carroll, Michael Gershman, David Neft, David Pietrusza, Beau Riffenburgh, Matthew Silverman, John Thorn)
- The Total Sports Illustrated Book of Boxing (W. C. Heinz and Nathan Ward)
- Total Stanley Cup: Official Publication of the National Hockey League (Dan Diamond)
- Total Steelers (Bob Carroll, Michael Gershman, David Neft, David Pietrusza, Beau Riffenburgh, Matthew Silverman, John Thorn)
- Total Super Bowl (Bob Carroll, Michael Gershman, David Neft, David Pietrusza, Beau Riffenburgh, Matthew Silverman, John Thorn)
- Total Teams Series 2000 (all 30 MLB teams as individual titles) (Gary Gillette, Stuart Shea)
- Trading Paint: Dale Earnhardt Vs. Jeff Gordon Classic Photos from a Classic Rivalry (Mark Bechtel, George Tiedemann)
- The 12 Leadership Principles of Dean Smith (David Chadwick)
- The World According to Dean: Four Decades of Basketball (Barry Jacobs)
- Years of Glory: The Six Team Era (Dan Diamond)
- Zim: A Baseball Life (Don Zimmer, Bill Madden)
