= Gershman =

Gershman is a surname, and may refer to:

- Alexander Gershman (born 1961), American surgeon
- Anita Gershman, American film producer
- Carl Gershman (born 1943), President of the National Endowment for Democracy
- Michael Gershman (publicist) (1941–2000), American writer and music producer
- Michael Gershman (director), American cinematographer
- Suzy Gershman (1948–2012), American author
- Zhenya Gershman (born 1975), American artist
