= On-base plus slugging =

Hitting statistic in baseball

On-base plus slugging (OPS) is a sabermetric baseball statistic calculated as the sum of a player's on-base percentage and slugging percentage. The ability of a player both to get on base and to hit for power, two important offensive skills, are represented. An OPS of .800 or higher in Major League Baseball puts the player in the upper echelon of hitters. Typically, the league leader in OPS will score near, and sometimes above, the 1.000 mark.

== Equation ==
The basic equation is

$OPS = OBP + SLG \,$

where OBP is on-base percentage and SLG is slugging average. These averages are defined below as:

$OBP = \frac{H+BB+HBP} {AB+BB+SF+HBP}$

- the numerator "H + BB + HBP" effectively means "number of trips to first base at least"

- the denominator "AB + BB + SF + HBP" effectively means "total plate appearances", but does not include sacrifice bunts

This is because though a batter makes a trip to the plate he is not given an "AB" when he walks (BB or HBP) or when he hits the ball into play and is called out, but the action allows a run to score (SF). As a result, the 4 counts (AB + BB + SF + HBP) are needed to calculate a batter's total trips to the plate.

and

$SLG = \frac{TB} {AB}$

where:

- H = hits
- BB = bases on balls
- HBP = times hit by pitch
- AB = at bats
- SF = sacrifice flies
- TB = total bases

In one equation, OPS can be represented as:

$OPS = \frac{AB*(H+BB+HBP)+TB*(AB+BB+SF+HBP)}{AB*(AB+BB+SF+HBP)}$

== History ==
On-base plus slugging was first popularized in 1984 by John Thorn and Pete Palmer's book, The Hidden Game of Baseball. The New York Times then began carrying the leaders in this statistic in its weekly "By the Numbers" box, a feature that continued for four years. Baseball journalist Peter Gammons used and evangelized the statistic, and other writers and broadcasters picked it up. The popularity of OPS gradually spread, and by 2004 it began appearing on Topps baseball cards.

OPS was formerly sometimes known as production. For instance, production was included in early versions of Thorn's Total Baseball encyclopedia, and in the Strat-O-Matic Computer Baseball game. This term has fallen out of use.

OPS gained popularity because of the availability of its components, OBP and SLG, and that team OPS correlates well with team runs scored.

== An OPS scale ==
Bill James, in his essay titled "The 96 Families of Hitters" uses seven different categories for classification by OPS:

Category	Classification	OPS range
A	Great	.9000 and higher
B	Very good	.8334 to .8999
C	Above average	.7667 to .8333
D	Average	.7000 to .7666
E	Below average	.6334 to .6999
F	Poor	.5667 to .6333
G	Very poor	.5666 and lower

This effectively transforms OPS into a seven-point ordinal scale. Substituting quality labels such as excellent (A), very good (B), good (C), average (D), fair (E), poor (F) and very poor (G) for the A–G categories creates a subjective reference for OPS values.

== Leaders ==
The top ten Major League Baseball players in lifetime OPS, with at least 3,000 plate appearances as of September 30, 2025, were:

1. Babe Ruth, 1.1636 (1914-1935)
2. Ted Williams, 1.1155 (1939–1942, 1946–1960)
3. Lou Gehrig, 1.0798 (1923–1939)
4. Oscar Charleston, 1.0639 (1915–1941)
5. Barry Bonds, 1.0512 (1986–2007)
6. Jimmie Foxx, 1.0376 (1925–1945)
7. Turkey Stearnes, 1.0325 (1920-1937)
8. Mule Suttles, 1.0299 (1921–1944)
9. Aaron Judge, 1.0282 (2016–present)
10. Hank Greenberg, 1.0169 (1930, 1933–1941, 1945–1947)

The top five were all left-handed batters. Jimmie Foxx has the highest career OPS for a right-handed batter.

The top ten single-season performances in MLB are:

1. Josh Gibson, 1.4744 (1937)
2. Josh Gibson, 1.4271 (1943)
3. Barry Bonds, 1.4217 (2004)
4. Charlie Smith, 1.4214 (1929)
5. Barry Bonds, 1.3807 (2002)
6. Babe Ruth, 1.3791 (1920)
7. Barry Bonds, 1.3785 (2001)
8. Babe Ruth, 1.3586 (1921)
9. Mule Suttles, 1.3489 (1926)
10. Mule Suttles, 1.3247 (1930)

Gibson holds the highest single-season OPS for a right-hander, while Barry Bonds holds the record for a left-hander. Since 1944, the highest single-season OPS for a right-hander is 1.2224 by Mark McGwire in 1998, which was 28th all-time.

== Adjusted OPS (OPS+) ==
OPS+, adjusted OPS, is a closely related statistic. OPS+ is OPS adjusted for the park and the league in which the player played. An OPS+ of 100 is defined to be the league average. An OPS+ of 150 or more is excellent and 125 very good, while an OPS+ of 75 or below is poor.

The basic equation for OPS+ is

$OPS+ = 100 * (\frac{OBP} {*lgOBP} + \frac{SLG} {*lgSLG} - 1)$

where *lgOBP is the park-adjusted OBP of the league and *lgSLG is the park-adjusted SLG of the league.

A common misconception is that OPS+ closely matches the ratio of a player's OPS to that of their league. In fact, due to the additive nature of the two components in OPS+, a player with an OBP and SLG both 50% better than the league average in those metrics will have an OPS+ of 200 (twice the league average OPS+) while still having an OPS that is only 50% better than the average OPS of the league. It would be a better (although not exact) approximation to say that a player with an OPS+ of 150 produces 50% more runs, in a given set of plate appearances than a player with an OPS+ of 100 (though see clarification above, under "History").

=== Leaders in OPS+ ===
Through the end of the 2025 season, the career top twenty leaders in OPS+ (minimum 3,000 plate appearances) were:

1. Babe Ruth, 206
2. Ted Williams, 191
3. Oscar Charleston, 184
4. Barry Bonds, 182
5. Aaron Judge, 179
5. Lou Gehrig, 179
7. Turkey Stearnes, 177
8. Rogers Hornsby, 175
9. Mickey Mantle, 172
9. Mule Suttles, 172
11. Dan Brouthers, 171
12. Joe Jackson, 170
13. Mike Trout, 169
14. Ty Cobb, 168
15. Pete Browning, 163
15. Jimmie Foxx, 163
15. Mark McGwire, 163
18. Dave Orr, 162
19. Shohei Ohtani, 160
19. Juan Soto, 160

The only purely right-handed batters to appear on this list are Hornsby, Judge, Trout, Suttles, Browning, Foxx, McGwire, Orr, and Greenberg. Mantle is the only switch-hitter in the group.

The top ten single-season performances were:

1. Josh Gibson, 281 (1943)
2. Josh Gibson, 273 (1937)
3. Barry Bonds, 268 (2002)
4. Barry Bonds, 263 (2004)
5. Barry Bonds, 259 (2001)
6. Fred Dunlap, 256 (1884) *
7. Babe Ruth, 255 (1920)
8. Mule Suttles, 253 (1930)
9. Oscar Charleston, 251 (1924)
9. Josh Gibson, 251 (1939)

* Fred Dunlap's historic 1884 season came in the Union Association, which some baseball experts consider not to be a true major league. If Dunlap's seasons were to be eliminated from the list, Charleston's 1921 season would be on the list.

== Criticism ==
Despite its simple calculation, OPS is a controversial measurement. OPS weighs on-base percentage and slugging percentage equally. However, on-base percentage correlates better with scoring runs. Statistics such as wOBA build on this distinction using linear weights. Additionally, the components of OPS are not typically equal (league-average slugging percentages are usually 75–100 points higher than league-average on-base percentages). As a point of reference, the OPS for all of Major League Baseball in 2024 was .711.

== See also ==
- Sabermetrics
- Gross production average
