= Professional Football Researchers Association =

Sports historians

- Formation: 1979; 47 years ago
- Type: Nonprofit
- Location: Guilford, NY, United States
- Region served: U.S.
- Services: American football research
- Executive Director: Lee Elder
- President: George Bozeka
- Website: profootballresearchers.org

The Professional Football Researchers Association (PFRA) is an organization of researchers whose mission is to preserve and, in some cases, reconstruct professional American football history. It was founded on June 22, 1979 in Canton, Ohio by writer/historian Bob Carroll and six other football researchers and is currently headed by an executive committee led by its president, George Bozeka, and executive director Leon Elder. Membership in the organization includes some of professional football's foremost historians and authors. The organization is based in Guilford, New York.

The PFRA publishes books and a bimonthly magazine, The Coffin Corner, devoted to topics in professional football history. The organization also gives out awards each year for outstanding achievement in the field of football research.

== The Coffin Corner ==
The Coffin Corner is a semimonthly magazine devoted to topics in professional football history. PFRA members publish their research findings in the articles, regardless of prior writing experience. In the case of newer authors and first-time contributors, the magazine's editors assist, anonymously, in helping develop the narratives for publication. The $35.00 annual membership in the organization includes a subscription to six issues of The Coffin Corner, as well as access to the "Members Only" section of their website, which contains detailed research on a variety of pro football subjects.

== Books ==
In cooperation with McFarland & Company, the PFRA is now working on the third installment in its "Great Teams in Pro Football History" series, edited by George Bozeka. Individual members of the association volunteer to author the different chapters, profiling in detail the players, the coaching staff, the preseason, regular season and postseason, and other elements of a team's season. The 1966 Green Bay Packers: Profiles of Vince Lombardi's Super Bowl I Champions was released in 2016, and The 1958 Baltimore Colts: Profiles of the NFL's First Sudden Death Champions followed in 2018. Writing is underway for the chapters of a book about the 1951 Los Angeles Rams season, was released in 2022. The fourth book, about the 1964 Buffalo Bills season, will follow in 2024.

== Committees and research projects ==
The PFRA maintains ongoing database projects, with committees of members who update the record as information develops, or as it is discovered in the course of research. Select committees may be disbanded as their work is completed.

All-America Football Conference
(chair: Ken Crippen)
Hall of Very Good Committee
The Hall of Very Good highlights outstanding players not in the Pro Football Hall of Fame. (chair: Andy Piascik)
Biography Committee
Responsible for writing biographies of every NFL player. (chairs: Greg Tranter, Jeffrey J. Miller, George Bozeka)
Education Committee
Collects and develops educational problems involving football for use in schools. (chair: Neal Golden)
Linescore Committee
Responsible for compiling linescores for all professional games played since 1920. (chair: Gary Selby)
Gamebooks Committee
The goal of the PFRA Gamebooks Committee is to collect gamebooks and play-by-play accounts for all of the games in NFL history. These can be a valuable tool for researchers, but acquiring them can be an arduous task. The goal is to share the collective efforts of a number of researchers and pool the results in one location, hopefully to foster future research. (chairs: Giovanni Malaty and Rupert Patrick)
Membership Committee
For the PFRA's internal purposes.
Pre-NFL Pro Football Committee
Researches all professional football prior to 1920, such as the Ohio League, Western Pennsylvania Professional Football Circuit, the Chicago and Philadelphia circuits, and the New York Pro Football League. (chair: Roy Sye)
Uniforms
Compiles all information on NFL, AFL and AAFC uniforms from 1933 to the present. (chair: Tim Brulia)
Oral History
Chronicles PFRA interviews with former NFL players. (chair: Ken Crippen)
NFL Officials
Compiles a list of all NFL officials, their positions and their uniform numbers. (chair: Gary Najman-Vainer)

== Hall of Very Good ==
The "Hall of Very Good" is a project done to highlight the best players, coaches and contributors not yet inducted into the Hall of Fame. The * indicates that person was inducted into the Pro Football Hall of Fame afterwards.

- 2003 – Gino Cappelletti, Carl Eller*, Pat Fischer, Benny Friedman*, Gene Hickerson*, Jerry Kramer*, Johnny Robinson*, Mac Speedie*, Mick Tingelhoff*, Al Wistert
- 2004 – Gene Brito, John Brodie, Jack Butler*, Chris Hanburger*, Bob Hayes*, Billy Howton, Jim Marshall, Al Nesser, Dave Robinson*, Duke Slater*
- 2005 – Maxie Baughan, Jim Benton, LaVern Dilweg, Pat Harder, Floyd Little*, Tommy Nobis, Pete Retzlaff, Tobin Rote, Lou Rymkus, Del Shofner
- 2006 – Charlie Conerly, John Hadl, Chuck Howley*, Alex Karras*, Eugene Lipscomb, Kyle Rote, Dick Stanfel*, Otis Taylor, Fuzzy Thurston, Dan Towler
- 2007 – Frankie Albert, Roger Brown, Timmy Brown, Marshall Goldberg, Jim Lee Howell, Glenn Presnell, Dick Schafrath, Jake Scott, Ed Sprinkle*, Paul "Tank" Younger
- 2008 – Dick Barwegan, Randy Gradishar*, Bob Hoernschemeyer, Cecil Isbell, Buddy Parker, Spec Sanders, Jim Ray Smith, Billy Wilson
- 2009 – Bruno Banducci, Harold Carmichael*, Blanton Collier, Boyd Dowler, Claude Humphrey*, Ken Kavanaugh, Verne Lewellen, Walt Sweeney
- 2010 – Robert Brazile*, Ed Budde, Don Coryell*, Ox Emerson, Chuck Foreman, Bob Gain, Riley Matheson, Jimmy Patton, Drew Pearson*, Ken Riley*
- 2011 – Ken Anderson, Cliff Branch*, Bobby Dillon*, Cliff Harris*, Harold Jackson, Andy Russell, Lou Saban, Tom Sestak, Jerry Smith
- 2012 – Bill Bergey, Curley Culp*, Kenny Easley*, Lester Hayes, Jack Kemp, Eddie Meador, L. C. Greenwood, Ray Wietecha, Swede Youngstrom
- 2013 – Erich Barnes, Mike Curtis, Roman Gabriel, Cookie Gilchrist, Bob Kuechenberg, Daryle Lamonica, Lemar Parrish, Donnie Shell*, Jim Tyrer
- 2014 – Larry Brown, Nolan Cromwell, Larry Grantham, Charlie Hennigan, Harlon Hill, Winston Hill*, George Kunz, Ken Stabler*
- 2015 – Alan Ameche, Rick Casares, Bill Forester, Rich Jackson, Chuck Knox, Ted Nesser, Gene Washington
- 2016 – Gary Collins, Gale Gillingham, Jim Katcavage, Joe Klecko*, Harvey Martin, Don Perkins, Duane Putnam, Isiah Robertson, Louis Wright
- 2017 – Bobby Boyd, Todd Christensen, Joe Fortunato, Dave Grayson, Cornell Green, Dan Reeves, Bob Skoronski
- 2018 – Lyle Alzado, Dick Anderson, Ken Gray, Lee Roy Jordan, Earl Morrall, Ralph Neely, Fred Smerlas
- 2019 – Joey Browner, Deron Cherry, Roger Craig*, Abner Haynes, Joe Jacoby, Art Powell, Everson Walls, Ed White
- 2020 – Ottis Anderson, Jay Hilgenberg, Ed Jones, Ron McDole, Karl Mecklenburg, Richie Petitbon, Sterling Sharpe*, Buddy Young
- 2021 – Grady Alderman, Russ Francis, Mike Kenn, Tony Latone, Stanley Morgan, John Niland, Clark Shaughnessy, Bill Stanfill, Bob Vogel, Abe Woodson
- 2022 – Mark Bavaro, Matt Blair, Mark Gastineau, Keith Jackson, Bert Jones, Bucko Kilroy, Clay Matthews, Jr., Lionel Taylor
- 2023 — Coy Bacon, Ray Childress, John David Crow, Earl Faison, Leon Gray, Nick Lowery, Michael Dean Perry, Buck Shaw, Jeff Van Note
- 2024 - Henry Ellard, Jim Lachey, Albert Lewis, Jerry Mays, Lydell Mitchell, Marvin Powell, Pat Swilling
- 2025 - Jim Bakken, Charley Brock, George Christensen, Clem Daniels, Chris Hinton, Kent Hull, Greg Lloyd, Wilber Marshall, Nate Newton, Mike Stratton

== Ralph Hay Award ==
The Ralph Hay Award, named after the Canton Bulldogs owner whose Hupmobile Automobile showroom was the site of the NFL's first organizational meeting, is awarded for "lifetime achievement in pro football research and historiography."

Past winners have been:

- 2022 - George Bozeka
- 2021 - Joe Ziemba
- 2020 - Joe Zagorski
- 2019 - Rupert Patrick
- 2018 - John Turney
- 2017 – John Maxymuk
- 2016 – Mark L. Ford
- 2015 – Jack Clary
- 2014 – Pete Fierle
- 2013 – Cliff Christl
- 2012 – Chris Willis
- 2011 – Ken Crippen
- 2010 – Pete Palmer
- 2009 – Bob Carroll
- 2008 – Ralph Hickok
- 2007 – Vince Popo
- 2006 – Emil Klosinski
- 2005 – John Gunn
- 2004 – Jeffrey J. Miller
- 2003 – John Hogrogian
- 2002 – Ken Pullis
- 2001 – Tod Maher
- 2000 – Mel "Buck" Bashore
- 1999 – Stan Grosshandler
- 1998 – Seymour Siwoff
- 1997 – Total Sports Publishing
- 1996 – Don Smith
- 1995 – John Hogrogian
- 1994 – Jim Campbell
- 1993 – Robert Van Atta
- 1992 – Richard Cohen
- 1991 – Joe Horrigan
- 1990 – Bob Gill
- 1989 – Joe Plack
- 1988 – David Neft

== Nelson Ross Award ==
The Nelson Ross Award is presented annually by the PFRA for "outstanding achievement in pro football research and historiography."

Past winners are:

- 2022 – Lee Elder, Coach George Allen: A Football Life
- 2021 – Jeffrey J. Miller and Greg Tranter, Relics: The History of the Buffalo Bills in Objects and Memorabilia
- 2020 – Richard Bak, for his book When Lions Were Kings: The Detroit Lions and the Fabulous Fifties
- 2019 – Chris Serb, for his book War Football: World War I and the Birth of the NFL
- 2018 – Doug Farrar, for his book The Genius of Desperation: The Schematic Innovations that Made the Modern NFL
- 2017 – Ralph Hickok, for his book, Vagabond Halfback: The Saga of Johnny Blood McNally
- 2016 – James C. Sulecki, for his book, The Cleveland Rams: The NFL Champs Who Left Too Soon, 1936-1945
- 2015 – Ted Kluck, for his book Three-Week Professionals: Inside the 1987 NFL Players’ Strike
- 2014 – William J. Ryczek, for his book, Connecticut Gridiron: Football Minor Leaguers of the 1960s and 1970s
- 2013 – Ivan Urena, for his book, Pro Football Schedules: A Complete Historical Guide 1933 to the Present
- 2012 – Dan Daly, for his book, The National Forgotten League
- 2011 – Mark Speck, for his book, ...and a Dollar Short: The Empty Promises, Broken Dreams and Somewhat-Less-Than-Comic Misadventures of the 1974 Florida Blazers
- 2010 – Kate Buford, for her book, Native American Son: The Life and Sporting Legend of Jim Thorpe
- 2009 – Robert Lyons, for his book, On Any Given Sunday: A Life of Bert Bell
- 2008 – Sean Lahman, for his book, The Pro Football Historical Abstract
- 2007 – Andy Piascik, for his book, The Best Show in Football: The 1946-1955 Cleveland Browns
- 2006 – Matthew Algeo, for his book, Last Team Standing: How the Steelers and the Eagles -- "The Steagles" -- Saved Pro Football During World War II
- 2005 – Chris Willis, for his book, Old Leather: An Oral History of Early Pro Football in Ohio, 1920-1935
- 2004 – Michael MacCambridge, for his book, America's Game: The Epic Story of How Pro Football Captured A Nation
- 2003 – Mark L. Ford, for his book, NFLX: NFL Exhibition Games 1950 to 2002
- 2002 – Bob Gill, Steve Brainerd, and Tod Maher, for their book, Minor League Football, 1960-1985
- 2001 – William J. Ryczek, for his book Crash of the Titans: The Early Years of the New York Jets and the AFL
- 2000 – Paul Reeths, for his book, "The USFL Chronicle"
- 1999 – Joe Ziemba, for his book, When Football Was Football: The Chicago Cardinals and the Birth of the NFL
- 1998 – Keith McClellan, for his book, The Sunday Game: At the Dawn of Professional Football
- 1997 – Tod Maher & Bob Gill, for their book, The Pro Football Encyclopedia
- 1996 – John Hogrogian, for his book, All-Pros: The First 40 years
- 1995 – Phil Dietrich, for his book, Down Payments : Professional Football 1896-1930
- 1994 – Rick Korch
- 1993 – Myron J. "Jack" Smith Jr., for his book, Professional Football: The Official Pro Football Hall of Fame Bibliography
- 1992 – John M. Carroll, for his book, Fritz Pollard: Pioneer in Racial Advancement
- 1991 – Tod Maher, for his book, Wiffle: The World Football League Chronicle
- 1990 – Pearce Johnson, for his book, Professional Football in Rhode Island and Its National Connections
- 1989 – Bob Gill
- 1988 – Bob Braunwart

== See also ==
- Society for American Baseball Research (SABR)
