= The Hidden Game of Football =

- Author: Bob Carroll, John Thorn, and Pete Palmer
- Original title: The Hidden Game of Football: A Revolutionary Approach to the Game and Its Statistics
- Language: English
- Publisher: Grand Central Publishing, Total Sports Publishing
- Publication date: January 1, 1988
- Publication place: United States
- Pages: 415
- ISBN: 0446514144

The Hidden Game of Football: A Revolutionary Approach to the Game and Its Statistics is a book on American football statistics published in 1988 and written by Bob Carroll, John Thorn, and Pete Palmer. It was the first systematic statistical approach to analyzing American football in a book.

== Original publication ==
The original was published in 1988. The purpose of the book is to look at the statistics of football and how they change the game based on coaching decision and player selection.

== Updated edition ==
In 1998, a new version title The Hidden Game Of Football: The Next Edition was published by the authors. The new version is updated and includes more commentary on past statistics. A 2023 edition, with a foreword by Aaron Schatz, is being published by University of Chicago Press.

== Reception ==
The book received mixed reviews at the time of its original publication, but has been assessed more positively by retrospective reviews. Christopher Lehmann-Haupt, in a 1988 review for The New York Times, found the application of statistics to football "cumbersome." By contrast, Shane Richmond of Pigskin Books wrote that "it’s likely that the book changed the way teams themselves think about the game; it certainly changed how the smarter sportswriters and analysts looked at it." Rustin Dodd, in a retrospective article in The Athletic, described the book as "a seminal work of football analytics" in 2022.

The book inspired Aaron Schatz to found Football Outsiders, and develop the Defense-adjusted Value Over Average (DVOA) statistic.

== See also ==
- Advanced statistics in basketball, statistical analysis of basketball.
- Analytics (ice hockey), statistical analysis of ice hockey.
- Advanced Football Analytics, website dedicated to the statistical analysis of the NFL.
- Ernie Adams, a Phillips Academy classmate of Bill Belichick whose role with the New England Patriots is compared to Bill James's role with the Boston Red Sox.
- Football Outsiders, a website dedicated to the statistical analysis of football based on some of the concepts from The Hidden Game of Football.
- Sabermetrics, statistical analysis of baseball.
- Sean Lahman, creator of the Pro Football Prospectus series, author of The Pro Football Historical Abstract, and editor of ESPN Pro Football Encyclopedia.
- Sports rating system
- Win probability
