= The Hidden Game of Baseball =

- Cover of the 2015 University of Chicago Press edition
- Author: John Thorn; Pete Palmer

The Hidden Game of Baseball is a book by baseball statisticians John Thorn and Pete Palmer. It was published in 1984 by Doubleday and is considered to be a seminal work in the fields of sabermetrics and baseball history.

== Overview ==
Thorn and Palmer began collaborating on an encyclopedia under the working title Complete Baseball, but could not meet the publisher's schedule. Instead, they began working on a smaller work focused on sabermetrics. The Hidden Game reappraised the relationship between in-game activity and the outcome of baseball games, suggesting that many of the statistics traditionally focused on up to that point did not meaningfully contribute to the likelihood of wins or losses. Palmer pioneered the use of linear weights in baseball statistics - adding up the weighted values of individual events to come up with a single number that represents the total value of a player's contributions. It formed the basis for Palmer's Total Player Rating, a direct ancestor to Wins Above Replacement (WAR). It is also credited with popularizing the use of run expectation tables in baseball analysis.

The book received critical praise at the time of its publication, and has since been reprinted.

== See also ==
- The Hidden Game of Football, book on football statistics by Thorn and Palmer
- Baseball Abstract, book on sabermetrics by Bill James
- Total Baseball
