= Michael Gershman =

Michael Gershman may refer to:

- Michael Gershman (publicist) (1939–2000), American writer, publicist, and music producer
- Michael Gershman (director) (1944–2018), American cinematographer and television director
