= Pro Football Reference =

American football statistics database

- Available in: English
- Owner: Sports Reference
- Website: www.pro-football-reference.com
- Launched: December 2000; 25 years ago
- Current status: Online

Pro Football Reference (PFR) is an online statistics database for professional American football maintained by Sports Reference. The site provides career statistics for players, teams, and games, as well as records and NFL draft history. PFR was established by Doug Drinen in 2000 and became part of Sports Reference in 2007.

== History ==
Pro Football Reference (PFR) was established by Doug Drinen in December 2000. In 2007, PFR merged with the previously unrelated Baseball Reference and Basketball Reference to form Sports Reference. In December 2019, PFR introduced the Pro Football Hall of Fame monitor. The purpose of this monitor is to apply a formula to quantify player contributions during their career (including All-Pro selections, Pro Bowl selections, various awards, and career statistics) and to highlight where Pro Football Hall of Fame players rank in comparison, often with the goal of estimating a player's chances of making the Hall of Fame. Drinen is also responsible for the creation of the "approximate value" statistic, a metric used to quantify the estimated value of a player's performance based on individual playing time and awards as well as team production in a given season.

In 2000, John Turney and Nick Webster, members of the Professional Football Researchers Association (PFRA), conducted extensive research to create a more complete record of sacks in the NFL. After examining the play-by-play records of every NFL team as well as game film at NFL films they compiled a list of players with 100 sacks beginning in 1960. These statistics, both the official and unofficial sack counts, are counted and displayed separately on the site from 1960 onwards.
