= Advanced Football Analytics =

Sports analysis website

Advanced Football Analytics (formerly Advanced NFL Stats) was a website dedicated to the analysis of the National Football League (NFL) using mathematical and statistical methods. The site's lead author was noted football researcher and analyst Brian Burke. Burke is a regular contributor to The New York Times' NFL coverage, The Washington Post's Commanders coverage, and supplies research for other notable publications and writers.

Advanced Football Analytics features a variety of analytical techniques and applications. The site predicts game outcomes and rates teams using a logistic regression model based on team efficiency statistics. It also features a live in-game win probability model that estimates the chances either opponent will win a game in progress. Advanced Football Analytics uses its win probability model to analyze strategic coaching decisions such as whether to kick or attempt first down conversions.

Research topics include game theory applications, luck and randomness, play calling, home field advantage, run-pass balance, and the relative importance of various facets of performance (offensive passing, offensive rushing, defensive passing, etc.). Also featured is research on weather factors, team payroll, and the NFL draft.

The site has pioneered other analytical concepts such as Air Yards, which is the distance forward of the line of scrimmage that a pass travels. It removes the contribution of Yards After Catch (YAC) run by a receiver.

Advanced Football Analytics also features a catalog of unique individual player stats. Each player's contribution toward his team's wins, known as Win Probability Added (WPA), is available for each season since 2000. Expected Points Added (EPA), success rate (SR), and many other innovative metrics are available.

During the NFL off-season, Burke has posted original research related to other North American professional sports leagues.

== See also ==
- Football Outsiders
- The Hidden Game of Football
- numberFire
