= Total player rating =

Baseball metric

Total player rating (TPR), also known as Batter-Fielder/Pitcher Wins (BFW/PW) is a metric for measuring the value of baseball players, and to enable players to be compared against each other even when they played for different teams, at different positions, and in different eras. It was developed by sabermetrician Pete Palmer and was popularized in the Total Baseball series of encyclopedias during the 1980s.

Total player rating is computed using linear weights, in which each event in a baseball game (for instance, a base on balls, a double or a stolen base) is assigned a value in runs. Each player then has a rating in Batting Runs, Pitching Runs, and Fielding Runs, usually adjusted for park and position, and the sum of these values is divided by 10 and is expressed as an offset in games from an "average" baseball player. Thus, a star player in a season might have been worth 6 games more than an average player, while a scrub might be 5 games below average. The justification for representing a game as 10 runs was determined empirically and varied by era, but 10 was the rule of thumb for back-of-the-envelope computations, e.g. for fans comparing players using runs created.

TPR helped disseminate the notion that players should not be given credit for events over which they have no control. As an example which embraces giving such credit, the runs batted in (RBI) statistic awards a hitter with runs which scored when he collected a hit or a walk, even though the player has no control over whether the players who batted before him got on base, which is a significant influence on whether he is able to drive them in. Thus, players with high RBI totals for a season may have such not because they're among the best hitters themselves, but because they hit behind players who are among the best at getting on base.

In the 1990s, some criticisms of TPR prompted other sabermetricians to develop new methods of measuring player value, such as equivalent average and value over replacement player. Bill James presented some of these criticisms in his book Win Shares, foremost among them being the observation that an average player has a TPR value of 0, whereas in fact an average player has substantial positive value.
