= Gary Gillette =

American baseball writer, author, and editor

Gary Gillette is an American baseball author, editor, historian, and analyst known for his extensive work in advanced baseball metrics, historical research, and publishing. Active since the early 1980s, he has contributed to numerous books, encyclopedias, websites, and databases, often collaborating with other leading figures in sabermetrics and baseball scholarship. Gillette’s work frequently centers on the business of baseball, the history of the Negro Leagues, and the legacy of Detroit baseball, including the Detroit Tigers and the Detroit Stars.

== Early career and background ==
Gillette attended Michigan State University where he was president of a tabletop gaming society.

Gillette’s involvement in advanced baseball analysis began in 1984, when he worked with Bill James, a pioneer in sabermetrics. Throughout the 1980s and 1990s, Gillette wrote for major newspapers such as USA Today and the Detroit Free Press, producing some of the earliest sabermetric content featured in mainstream media. During this period, he also contributed to a variety of baseball annuals and magazines, helping to develop new forms of baseball data interpretation.

== Publishing, editing, and analysis ==
Over four decades, Gillette has authored, edited, or contributed to dozens of influential baseball reference works, including Total Baseball, The ESPN Baseball Encyclopedia, and several editions of the Baseball Prospectus annuals. He served as editor-in-chief and designer of the ESPN Baseball Encyclopedia and The Baseball Encyclopedia (Barnes & Noble Publishing), as well as the ESPN Pro Football Encyclopedia. His editorial roles often combined rigorous statistical analysis with accessible narrative, bridging the gap between academic-level research and a broader readership.

In addition to book projects, Gillette maintained extensive proprietary databases covering Major League Baseball, Minor League Baseball, and other professional sports. Through his company, Hidden Game Sports, these databases were licensed to major media organizations, including ESPN, Sports Reference, SportsTicker, SportRadar US, and Stats LLC. In 2021, Sports Reference acquired Hidden Game’s comprehensive professional sports databases. Gillette has also served as a consultant and expert witness for baseball-related litigation since the 1990s. He frequently partners with statistician Pete Palmer.

== Negro Leagues and historical preservation ==
A nationally recognized expert on the Negro Leagues, Gillette has extensively researched the Detroit Stars and other early Black baseball clubs. He played a pivotal role in historical preservation efforts for Hamtramck Stadium—one of the few surviving Negro League ballparks—organizing research that secured its placement on the National Register of Historic Places. As founder and chair of the nonprofit Friends of Historic Hamtramck Stadium, Gillette spearheaded the stadium’s restoration, completed in 2022, and helped secure National Park Service African American Civil Rights Grants. He has curated exhibits, organized conferences, and been a leading voice in improving understanding and recognition of the Negro Leagues’ legacy.

Gillette’s involvement as co-host and organizer of the Jerry Malloy Negro Leagues Conference has garnered honors, including being named “Most Valuable Partner” in 2023. He also received the Tweed Webb Lifetime Achievement Award from the Society for American Baseball Research (SABR) Negro Leagues Committee for his sustained contributions to the field, and—through Friends of Historic Hamtramck Stadium—a 2023 Governor's Award for Historic Preservation.

== Focus on Detroit baseball history ==
Gillette’s work displays a pronounced focus on Detroit baseball, both major and minor leagues. He has contributed historical research to honor the old Tiger Stadium site and has served as a consultant on Detroit-area historical markers and commemorations, including the Walk of Fame at the Detroit Police Athletic League’s Corner Ballpark. His research and commentary on Detroit baseball history, along with his ongoing credentialed coverage of the Detroit Tigers since 2003, position him as a leading figure in chronicling the city’s baseball heritage.

== Academic and public engagement ==
Gillette regularly presents original research at conferences, symposia, and academic gatherings, including the Jerry Malloy Negro Leagues Conference, the Canadian Baseball History Conference, and events organized by SABR and the National Baseball Hall of Fame. He has lectured on topics ranging from the Negro Leagues to the economics of baseball and historical preservation efforts. Gillette has also worked with organizations committed to promoting greater representation in baseball’s historical narrative, such as the 42 For 21 Committee, which advocates for more robust Hall of Fame consideration for overlooked Black players from the segregated era. He founded SABR’s Detroit Chapter and is currently president of SABR’s Southern Michigan Chapter, which absorbed several regional chapters. He also led two national research committees for SABR: The Business of Baseball Committee, and the Ballparks Committee.

== Selected publications ==
- The ESPN Baseball Encyclopedia (Sterling Publishing)
- The ESPN Pro Football Encyclopedia (Sterling Publishing)
- The Baseball Encyclopedia (Barnes & Noble Publishing)
- Total Baseball Encyclopedia (Contributor and researcher)
- Baseball Prospectus (Contributing author)
- Biographical Encyclopedia of the Negro Baseball Leagues (Editor and contributor, forthcoming web edition in 2025)
- Emerald Guide to Baseball (SABR)
- Big League Ballparks: The Complete Illustrated History of Major-League Baseball Parks (Metro Books)
- “The Paradox of Integration: Racial Composition of NFL Positions, 1960–2020” (Sociology of Race and Ethnicity)
