= Roosevelt Sweeps Nation =

2022 US history book by David Pietrusza

- Author: David Pietrusza
- Language: English
- Genre: Popular history
- Publisher: Diversion Books
- Publication date: June 2022
- Publication place: United States
- ISBN: 978-1-63576-777-3

Roosevelt Sweeps Nation: FDR's 1936 Landslide and the Triumph of the Liberal Ideal is a 2022 popular history book about the 1936 United States presidential election written by David Pietrusza and published by Diversion Books. The book was met with high praise from publications such as Kirkus Reviews, the Library Journal, and Publishers Weekly and was nominated for the New Deal Book Award in 2022.
