= Before the League =

- Genre: Documentary film
- Written by: Alison Momeyer, Bryan Levin
- Directed by: Jason Pheister
- Narrated by: Chuck Campbell
- Theme music composer: Ben Devine
- Country of origin: United States
- Original language: English
- No. of seasons: 1
- No. of episodes: 6

Production
- Executive producers: Jason Pheister, Alison Momeyer
- Cinematography: Rick Davis, Bryan Levin
- Editor: Bryan Levin
- Running time: 3 h (180 min)
- Production companies: Before The League, LLC

Original release
- Network: Time Warner Cable SportsChannel
- Release: November 17, 2015

Before The League is a documentary series on the history of professional American football that ultimately became the NFL. The series debuted at the Pro Football Hall of Fame on October 27, 2015. The film is broken into a six parts which tell the story of the evolution from rugby to the formation and creation of the American Professional Football Association in 1920. The series aired on Time Warner Cable SportsChannel on November 17 and 18, 2015.

The series was awarded several times including in the prestigious Emmy Awards and national Telly Awards in 2016. Before The League director and executive producer Jason Pheister and lead writer and executive producer Alison Momeyer, were each awarded Emmys for their roles. In total, the series received three Emmy Awards, five Emmy nominations, and five Telly Awards.

The series examines how small towns like Canton and Massillon, Ohio were the blueprint for fielding early pro football teams as well as fostering healthy rivalries. As precursors to the current day NFL, teams like the Akron Pros, Dayton Triangles, Columbus Panhandles, Portsmouth Spartans, Ironton Tanks, Shelby Blues, Oorang Indians, Rochester Jeffersons, Buffalo All-Americans, Milwaukee Badgers, and Green Bay Packers laid the groundwork for the successes of today's big city NFL teams. The series focuses mainly on the Ohio League, the NFL's most immediate predecessor, while also making note of other regional teams and circuits such as the western Pennsylvania conference and New York Pro Football League.

== Actors and historians ==
The documentary film is narrated by Chuck Campbell.

Several noted historians of pro football give background information including Joe Horrigan, author and Pro Football Hall of Fame lead historian and head of communications and exhibits; Kate Buford, author and biographer of Jim Thorpe; Chris Willis, author of several books, including the biography of Joe Carr; Keith McLellan, author of "The Sunday Game;" Jeffrey J. Miller, author of "Buffalo's Forgotten Champions;" and John Steffenhagen, historian of the Rochester Jeffersons and great-grandson of NFL co-founder Leo Lyons. Additionally, Hall of Fame Running Back Floyd Little provides his perspective on the subject.

== Episodes ==
No.	Title	Original release date
1	"Origins"	November 17, 2015
American Football was born in America in the late 1800s, evolving from a hybrid of soccer and rugby through a series of adaptations introduced on the field by college and working class men. Pioneers of the sport like Walter Camp, a student at Yale who attended the game’s first rules committee, Charles Follis, the first African American to play professional football, and Pudge Heffelfinger, the game’s first documented paid player, were instrumental in creating a new sport.
2	"Ringers"	November 17, 2015
American Football is described as being akin to the “wild west” with teams, coaches and players exploiting loopholes in the rules. Company teams like the Columbus Panhandles, made up of working men who played football during their lunch breaks, and the original Green Bay Packers, formed as a way to advertise the Acme Packing Plant, were created to support local industry. Opportunity gave way to exploitation as ringers flooded the sport, eager to make their mark and their fortune.
3	"Scandals"	November 17, 2015
From the beginning, money and competition led to historic scandals between teams like the Canton Bulldogs and the Massillon Tigers, with accusations of cheating. Brutality on the field led to the intervention of President Theodore Roosevelt, putting an end to some of the game’s most dangerous elements like the flying wedge. But coaches and players persisted in shaping rules to their advantage.
4	"Legends"	November 18, 2015
The power of celebrity to bring fans, attention and money to the game is seen with the addition by Jack Cusack of Olympic powerhouse Jim Thorpe to the Canton Bulldogs. While rule changes like the elimination of restrictions to the forward pass helped strike a balance between offensive and defensive plays.
5	"Formation"	November 18, 2015
Once again, Stark County, Ohio is pivotal in guiding the future of football with the first ever owners meeting held to in Canton, Ohio to form a new league. Dayton, Ohio claims the first-ever NFL game and Fritz Pollard makes history becoming the first African American coach of an NFL team, leading the Akron Pros to the first league title.
6	"Business"	November 18, 2015
The arrival of players like Red Grange effectively ends the sandlot era of football, pushing teams to compete for permanent rosters. The promise of increased revenue through expansion, directly threatens the small town team originally at the core of football’s identify. The Oorang Indians are a momentary exception and the smallest NFL franchise on record while small town teams like Portsmouth Spartans, Ironton Tanks and Dayton Triangles can’t compare with the success of the Green Bay Packers.
