= David Pietrusza =

American historian (born 1949)

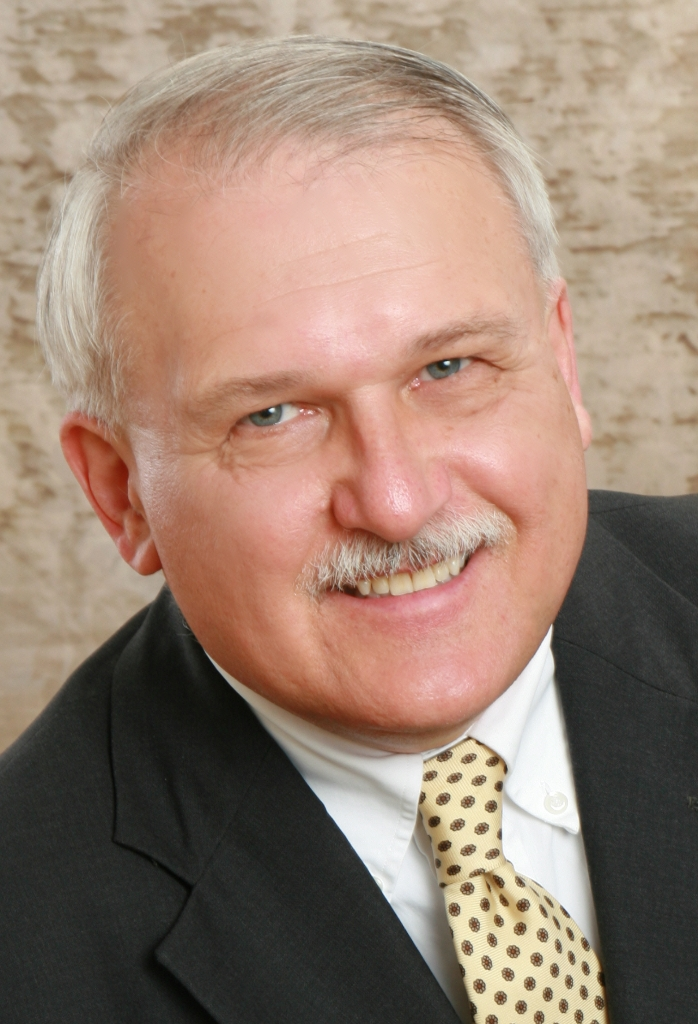
- Born: November 22, 1949; Amsterdam, NY
- Education: The State University of New York at Albany
- Occupations: author, editor, lecturer, political commentator
- Website: www.davidpietrusza.com

David Pietrusza is an American author and historian, and is considered an expert on US politics in the 1920s.

He has written a number of books, including Roosevelt Sweeps Nation: FDR's 1936 Landslide and the Triumph of the Liberal Ideal, which won the 2023 Independent Publisher Book Awards Gold Medal for US History, received a Kirkus starred review and was nominated for the 2022 Kirkus Prize and the 2022 New Deal Book Award. Born in Amsterdam, New York, Pietrusza graduated from the State University of New York at Albany with bachelor's and master's degrees in history.

He won election to Amsterdam's City Council from the city's Fourth Ward, in 1985.

In 2015 the Greater Amsterdam (NY) School District inducted Pietrusza into the inaugural class of its Hall of Fame (along with humanitarian Dr. Tom Catena).

== Awards and honors ==
- CASEY Award for Judge and Jury: The Life and Times of Judge Kenesaw Mountain Landis
- Finalist (1999), The Seymour Medal, Judge and Jury: The Life and Times of Judge Kenesaw Mountain Landis
- Rothstein, Nominated, Best Fact Crime Book 2004, The Edgar Awards of The Mystery Writers of America.
- Excellence in Arts & Letters Award, University at Albany Alumni Association
- Greater Amsterdam (NY) School District Hall of Fame (initial class)
- Roosevelt Sweeps Nation: FDR's 1936 Landslide and the Triumph of the Liberal Ideal won the 2023 Independent Publisher Book Awards Gold Medal for US History.
- TR's Last War: Theodore Roosevelt, the Great War, and a Journey of Triumph and Tragedy won the 2019 Independent Publisher Book Awards Silver Medal for US History.
- Gangsterland: A Tour Through the Dark Heart of Jazz-Age New York City won the 2024 Independent Publisher Book Awards Silver Medal (tie) for Regional US Non-Fiction.
- Gangsterland: A Tour Through the Dark Heart of Jazz-Age New York Citywas honored as a 2024 NYC Big Book Award Distinguished Favorite
- Finalist (1997), The CASEY Award, Lights On! The Wild, Century-Long Saga of Night Baseball
- 2022 New Deal Book Nominee, Roosevelt Sweeps Nation: FDR’s 1936 Landslide and the Triumph of the Liberal Ideal.

== Written or edited by David Pietrusza ==
- Pietrusza, David (2023). Gangsterland: A Tour Through the Dark Heart of Jazz-Age New York City. Diversion Books. ISBN 9781635769890.
- Pietrusza, David (2022). Roosevelt Sweeps Nation: FDR's 1936 Landslide and the Triumph of the Liberal Ideal. Diversion Books. ISBN 9781635767773.
- Pietrusza, David (2020). Too Long Ago: A Childhood Memory. A Vanished World. Church & Reid Books. ISBN 9798682923281.
- Pietrusza, David (2018). TR's Last War: Theodore Roosevelt, The Great War, and a Journey of Triumph and Tragedy. Lyons Press. ISBN 978-1493028870.
- Pietrusza, David (2015). 1932: The Rise of Hitler and FDR: Two Tales of Politics, Betrayal and Unlikely Destiny. Lyons Press. ISBN 9780762793020.
- Pietrusza, David (2014). Dance Hall: A Novel of Sing Sing. Church & Reid Books. ISBN 9781440494055.
- Pietrusza, David (2013). Calvin Coolidge: A Documentary Biography. Create Space. ISBN 9781468017779.
- Pietrusza, David (2012). Calvin Coolidge on The Founders: Reflections on the American Revolution & the Founding Fathers. Create Space. ISBN 978-1479213528.
- Pietrusza, David (2011). 1948: Harry Truman's Improbable Victory and the Year that Transformed America. Union Square Press. ISBN 978-1402767487.
- Pietrusza, David (2008). Sursum Corda: Documents and Readings on the Traditional Latin Mass. Create Space. ISBN 978-1438256177.
- Pietrusza, David (2008). 1960: LBJ vs JFK vs Nixon: The Epic Campaign that Forged Three Presidencies. Union Square Press. ISBN 978-1402767487.
- Pietrusza, David (2008). Silent Cal's Almanack: The Homespun Wit and Wisdom of Vermont's Calvin Coolidge. Create Space. ISBN 978-1438245409.
- Pietrusza, David (2006). 1920: The Year of the Six Presidents. Carroll & Graf. ISBN 978-0786716227.
- Pietrusza, David (2004). Rothstein: The Life, Times and Murder of the Criminal Genius who Fixed the 1919 World Series. Carroll & Graf. ISBN 978-0786712502.
- Pietrusza, David (2001). Judge and Jury: The Life and Times of Judge Kenesaw Mountain Landis (Foreword by Dick Thornburgh). Diamond Communications. ISBN 978-1888698091.
- Pietrusza, David (with Ted Williams) (2001). Ted Williams: My Life in Pictures (with Ted Williams) (aka Teddy Ballgame). Total Sports. ISBN 978-1930844070.
- Pietrusza, David (1997). Lights On!: The Wild, Century-Long Saga of Night Baseball (Foreword by Enos Slaughter). Scarecrow Press. ISBN 9780810833074.
- Pietrusza, David (1995). Minor Miracles: The Legend and Lure of Minor League Baseball. Diamond Communications. ISBN 9780912083827.
- Pietrusza, David (1991). Major Leagues: The Formation, Sometimes Absorption and Mostly Inevitable Demise of 18 Professional Baseball Organizations, 1871 to Present (Foreword by Lee MacPhail). McFarland Publishing. ISBN 9780912083827.
- Pietrusza, David (1990). Baseball's Canadian American League: A History of Its Inception, Franchises, Participants, Locales, Statistics, Demise & Legacy, 1936-195" (Foreword by John Thorn). McFarland Publishing. ISBN 9780899505084.

== Co-edited by David Pietrusza ==
- Pietrusza, David (2000). Baseball: The Biographical Encyclopedia. Total Sports/Sports Illustrated Publishing. ISBN 978-1892129345.
- Pietrusza, David (1999). Total Baseball: The Official Encyclopedia of Major League Baseball. Total Sports. ISBN 978-1892129031.
- Pietrusza, David (1998). The Total Baseball Catalog: Great Baseball Stuff and How to Buy It. Total Sports. ISBN 978-0965694933.
- Pietrusza, David (1998). The Hidden Game of Football. Total Sports. ISBN 1-892129-01-9.
- Pietrusza, David (1998). Total Super Bowl. HarperPerennial. ISBN 0-06-105885-8.
- Pietrusza, David (1998). Total Quarterbacks. HarperPerennial. ISBN 0-06-105891-2.
- Pietrusza, David (1998). Total Quarterbacks. HarperPerennial. ISBN 0-06-105891-2.
- Pietrusza, David (1998). Total Steelers. HarperPerennial. ISBN 0-06-105894-7.
- Pietrusza, David (1998). Total 49ers. HarperPerennial. ISBN 0-06-105897-1.
- Pietrusza, David (1998). Total Packers. HarperPerennial. ISBN 0-06-105892-0.
- Pietrusza, David (1998). Total Cowboys. HarperPerennial. ISBN 0-06-105899-8.
- Pietrusza, David (1997). Total Mets. Total Sports. ISBN 0-9656949-0-9.
- Pietrusza, David (1996). Total Braves. Penguin Books. ISBN 978-0140257298.
- Pietrusza, David (1996). Total Indians. Penguin Books. ISBN 978-0140257281.

== Managing editor ==
- Carroll, Bob, Michael Gershman, David Neft and John Thorn (1997). Total Football: The Official Encyclopedia of the National Football League. HarperResource. ISBN 978-0062701701.

== Books for younger readers ==
- Pietrusza, David (2001). The Cleveland Indians Baseball Team. Enslow. ISBN 978-0766014916.
- Pietrusza, David (2001). The St. Louis Cardinals Baseball Team. Enslow. ISBN 978-0766014909.
- Pietrusza, David (2000). The San Francisco Giants Baseball Team. Enslow. ISBN 978-0766012844.
- Pietrusza, David (2000). The Baltimore Orioles Baseball Team. Enslow. ISBN 978-0766012837.
- Pietrusza, David (1999). Michael Jordan. Lucent. ISBN 978-1560063506.
- Pietrusza, David (1998). The Roaring Twenties. Lucent. ISBN 978-1560063094.
- Pietrusza, David (1998). Top 10 Baseball Managers. Enslow. ISBN 978-0766010765.
- Pietrusza, David (1998). The Los Angeles Dodgers Baseball Team. Enslow. ISBN 978-0766010970.
- Pietrusza, David (1997). The New York Yankees Baseball Team. Enslow. ISBN 978-0766010185.
- Pietrusza, David (1997). The Boston Celtics Basketball Team. Enslow. ISBN 978-0766010192.
- Pietrusza, David (1997). The Phoenix Suns Basketball Team. Enslow. ISBN 978-0894907951.
- Pietrusza, David (1996). Mysterious Deaths: John F. Kennedy. Lucent. ISBN 978-1560062639.
- Pietrusza, David (1996). The Chinese Cultural Revolution. Lucent. ISBN 978-1560063056.
- Pietrusza, David (1996). Smoking. Lucent. ISBN 978-1560061861.
- Pietrusza, David (1995). The Invasion of Normandy. Lucent. ISBN 978-1560064138.
- Pietrusza, David (1995). The Battle of Waterloo. Lucent. ISBN 978-1560064237.
- Pietrusza, David (1994). The End of the Cold War. Lucent. ISBN 978-1560062806.
