= Jeffrey J. Miller =

American author and historian (born 1961)

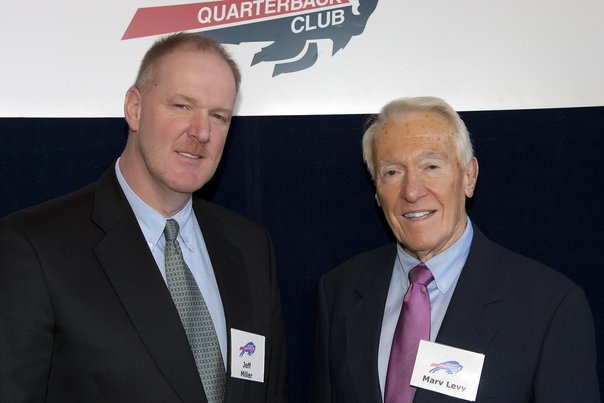
Jeffrey J. Miller with Marv Levy at a book signing event in 2009

Jeffrey J. Miller (born 1961) is an American author and historian, best known for his work focusing on the history of American professional football. His books include Game Changers: The Greatest Plays in Buffalo Bills Football History (co-written with Hall-of-Fame coach Marv Levy), and Rockin' the Rockpile: The Buffalo Bills of the American Football League,

== Books ==
Published in May 1996, Miller's first book, The Icemen Cameth, tells the story of the natural ice industry that flourished in his small hometown of Lime Lake, New York in the late 1800s and early 1900s. This book is now out of print.

Buffalo's Forgotten Champions was published in August 2004. This book chronicles the history of the Buffalo's first National Football League team—the Buffalo All-Americans (1920–23), Bisons (1924–25, '27, '29), Rangers (1926). The All-Americans are significant in the annals of pro football not only for being charter members of the league, but also for having claimed the American Professional Football Association (as the NFL was known in its first two seasons) championship in 1921. The title was later stripped and awarded to George Halas' Chicago Staleys, for which Miller coined the term "Staley Swindle".

In August 2007, Miller's third book, Rockin' the Rockpile, is a comprehensive history of the Buffalo Bills AFL era. Over 60 former players, coaches and front office personnel, including owner Ralph Wilson, head coach Lou Saban, Hall-of-Fame guard Billy Shaw (who wrote the book's foreword), quarterback Jack Kemp, linebacker Mike Stratton, cornerback Butch Byrd, kicker Pete Gogolak, and wide receiver Elbert Dubenion were interviewed for this project.

Miller collaborated with Marv Levy, the Bills' Hall-of-Fame coach, for Game Changers: The Greatest Plays in Buffalo Bills Football History, which was released in October 2009. Game Changers focuses on 36 of the most memorable plays in Buffalo Bills history. Coach Levy wrote about the plays that occurred during his tenure as the team's head coach, while Miller wrote about the great plays that happened during the pre- and post-Levy years.

October 2012 saw the release of Miller's fifth book, 100 Things Bills Fans Should Know and Do Before They Die, for which Marv Levy wrote the foreword.

His sixth book, Pop Warner: A Life on the Gridiron, a biography of the legendary coach of the Stanford, Pittsburgh and Carlisle football teams, was published in August 2015.

August 2021 was the release date for RELICS: The History of the Buffalo Bills in Objects & Memorabilia, on which Miller partnered with Buffalo Bills uber-collector and historian Greg Tranter. This book is a new approach to chronicling the history of the Buffalo Bills by telling the story through its memorabilia and various collectibles, including game-worn equipment, one-of-kind objects such as Ralph Wilson's Hall-or-Fame Jacket, cherished mementos from the players including championship rings (and other surprise items), as well popular items such as the Whammy Weenie, Flutie Flakes, game programs, action figures, pennants and much more. Published by St. Johann's Press September 2021.

A revised and updated version of his 2012 offering, 100 Things Bills Fans Should Know & Do Before They Die, was published in the fall of 2021. Several chapters were updated to include events that had transpired between the original publication date and the 2020 season, such as Tom Flores and Andre Reed making it into the Pro Football Hall of Fame, Ralph Wilson's passing and the eventual sale of the team. Seven chapters were replaced with new pieces on Josh Allen, Sean McDermott, the Bills Mafia, and more.

Leo Lyons, the Rochester Jeffersons & the Birth of the NFL, Miller's ninth book, was published in June 2025. It tells the story of the Rochester Jeffersons, an original NFL franchise that played 1920–25, and the team's owner, Leo Lyons. It was co-written with Lyons' great-grandson, John D. Steffenhagen. Lyons is credited with many innovations in pro football, including designing the first pro team logo, creating bubble gum cards to promote the game, and helping to redesign the ball from its old melon shape into today's ball. He conceived the idea of the Pro Football Hall of Fame, and was named the first historian of the National Football League. He is also credited with hiring the fourth known black professional football player when he signed Henry McDonald to play for the Jeffersons in 1912.

== Documentaries ==
Miller has appeared as a featured commentator in two documentaries focusing on football history. In 2009, he was featured in the NFL Films production History of the Buffalo Bills, which coincided with the 50th anniversary of the franchise. It is available on DVD.

In 2015, he appeared in Time Warner Sports Network's Before The League documentary, which told the story of the evolution of professional football prior to the founding of the National Football League in 1920. The six-part series originally aired in November 2015. This film is expected to be released on DVD, but no date has been announced.

Miller has also been featured in multiple episodes of the NFL Network's NFL Top 10 series.

== Awards ==
In 2025, Miller and John Steffenhagen, his coauthor for the book Leo Lyons, the Rochester Jeffersons and the Birth of the NFL, were awarded the Nelson Ross Award for "Outstanding recent achievement in pro football research and historiography" by the Professional Football Researchers Association. This was Miller's second time winning this award, having received it for the first time in 2021 with Greg Tranter, with whom he coauthored RELICS: The History of the Buffalo Bills in Objects & Memorabilia. Miller was the 2004 recipient of the PFRA's Ralph E. Hay Award, presented for "Lifetime achievement in professional football research and historiography" and winner of the PFRA 2003 Writing Award for articles "Focusing on a Significant Pro Football Personality."
