= Save (baseball) =

Baseball statistic for pitchers

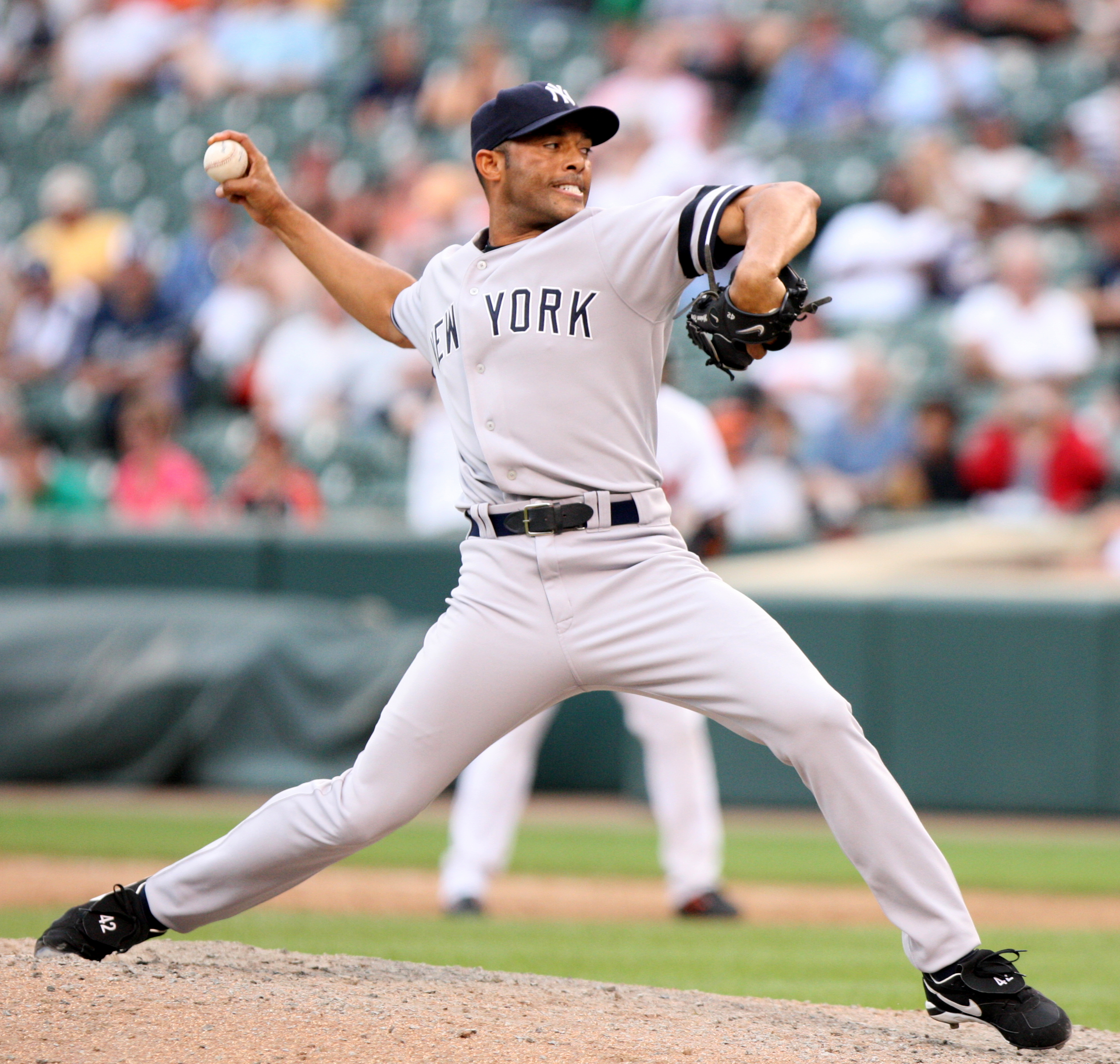
Mariano Rivera is the MLB all-time leader in saves.

In baseball, a save (abbr. SV or S) is credited to a pitcher who finishes a game for the winning team under certain circumstances. A save can be earned by entering a game in which his team is leading by three or fewer runs and finishing the game by pitching at least one inning without losing the lead; entering the game with the tying run in the on-deck circle, at the plate or on the bases and finishing the game; or by pitching at least three innings in relief and finishing the game regardless of how many runs his team was winning by when entering the game. The number of saves or percentage of save opportunities successfully converted are oft-cited statistics of relief pitchers, particularly those in the closer role.

The save statistic was created by journalist Jerome Holtzman in 1959 to "measure the effectiveness of relief pitchers" and was adopted as an official Major League Baseball (MLB) statistic in 1969. The save has been retroactively tabulated for pitchers before that date. Mariano Rivera is MLB's all-time leader in regular-season saves with 652, while Francisco Rodríguez earned the most saves in a single season with 62 in 2008.

== History ==
The term save was being used as far back as 1952. Executives Jim Toomey of the St. Louis Cardinals and Irv Kaze of the Pittsburgh Pirates, and statistician Allan Roth of the Brooklyn/Los Angeles Dodgers awarded saves to pitchers who finished winning games but were not credited with the win, regardless of the margin of victory. The statistic went largely unnoticed.

The concept of a reliever "saving" a baseball game for a starting pitcher goes back even further. A 1933 Goudey baseball card of Firpo Marberry of the Detroit Tigers states he "Specializes in saving ball games when other pitchers are getting their bumps."

A formula with more criteria for saves was invented in 1960 by baseball writer Jerome Holtzman. He felt that the existing statistics at the time, earned run average (ERA) and win–loss record (W-L), did not sufficiently measure a reliever's effectiveness. ERA does not account for inherited runners a reliever allows to score, and W-L record does not account for relievers protecting leads. Elroy Face of the Pittsburgh Pirates was 18–1 in 1959; however, Holtzman wrote that in 10 of the 18 wins, Face allowed the tying or lead run but got the win when the Pirates offense regained the lead. (Note: Baseball-Reference.com differs slightly and recorded it occurring in only seven of the 18 wins. Face blew leads in his wins four times (April 24, May 14, June 11, and July 12), allowed lead runs in tie games he won three times (April 22, Aug 30, and Sept 19), and allowed an additional run while already behind in a win once (Aug 9). Associated Press also reported Face allowing a tying run to score in his July 9 win over the Chicago Cubs.) Holtzman felt that Face was more effective the previous year when he was 5–2. When Holtzman presented the idea to J. G. Taylor Spink, publisher of The Sporting News, "[Spink] gave [Holtzman] a $100 bonus. Maybe it was $200." Holtzman recorded the unofficial save statistic in The Sporting News weekly for nine years before it became official in 1969. In conjunction with publishing the statistic, The Sporting News in 1960 also introduced the Fireman of the Year Award, which was awarded based on a combination of saves and wins.

The save became an official MLB statistic in 1969. It was MLB's first new major statistic since the run batted in was added in 1920.

=== Notable saves ===
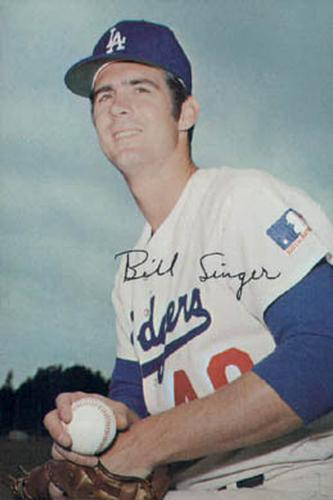
Bill Singer was credited with the first official save, in 1969.

On April 7, 1969, Bill Singer was credited with the first official save when he pitched three shutout innings in relief of Don Drysdale in the Los Angeles Dodgers' 3–2 Opening Day victory over the Cincinnati Reds at Crosley Field.

On April 27, 1969, Frank Linzy of the San Francisco Giants became the first pitcher to be credited with two saves in one day, registering saves in both games of a doubleheader against the Houston Astros.

On April 29, 1970, Stan Williams of the Minnesota Twins became the first pitcher credited with a save without facing a batter. In a home game against the Cleveland Indians with the Twins holding a 1–0 lead, Williams entered in relief of Jim Kaat in the top of the ninth inning with two outs and runners on first and second; he then picked off runner Tony Horton at second base, ending the game.

On September 3, 2002, the Texas Rangers won 7–1 over the Baltimore Orioles as Joaquín Benoit pitched a seven-inning save, the longest save since it had become an official statistic in 1969. (Note: Benoit bested the previous record of six innings by Horacio Piña of the Rangers in 1972. Baseball-Reference.com retroactively credited eight-inning saves to pitchers prior to 1969 including Jim Shaw (1920), Guy Morton (1920), and Dick Hall (1961).) Benoit relieved Todd Van Poppel (who entered the game in the first inning after starter Aaron Myette was ejected for throwing at Melvin Mora) at the start of the third inning, and finished the game while allowing just one hit. The official scorer credited the win to Van Poppel and not Benoit, a decision that was also supported by Texas manager Jerry Narron.

On August 22, 2007, Wes Littleton earned a save with the largest winning margin ever, pitching the last three innings of a 30–3 Texas Rangers win over the Baltimore Orioles. Littleton entered the game with a 14–3 lead, and the final 27-run differential broke the previous record for a save by eight runs. The New York Times noted that "there are the preposterous saves, of which Littleton's now stands out as No. 1."

On October 29, 2014, in Game 7 of the 2014 World Series, Madison Bumgarner of the San Francisco Giants recorded the longest save in World Series history, pitching five scoreless innings of relief in a 3–2 victory over the Kansas City Royals.

== Usage ==
In baseball statistics, the term save is used to indicate the successful maintenance of a lead by a relief pitcher, usually the closer, until the end of the game. A save is a statistic credited to a relief pitcher, as set forth in Rule 9.19 of the Official Rules of Major League Baseball. The current definition has been in place since 1975. That rule states the official scorer shall credit a pitcher with a save when such pitcher meets all four of the following conditions:

1. He is the finishing pitcher in a game won by his team;
2. He is not the winning pitcher;
3. He is credited with at least 1/3 of an inning pitched; and
4. He satisfies one of the following conditions:
  1. He enters the game with a lead of no more than three runs and pitches for at least one inning
  2. He enters the game with the potential tying run either on base, at bat or on deck
  3. He pitches for at least three innings.

The definition of a save has not always been the same. As initially defined in 1969, a relief pitcher could earn a save if he entered a game with his team in the lead and he held the lead through the end of the game, regardless of the score or for how long he pitched. This produced some especially "easy" saves, such as Ron Taylor being credited with a save after pitching a scoreless ninth inning in a 20–6 New York Mets win over the Atlanta Braves in August 1971. In 1974, tougher criteria were adopted for saves where either the tying run had to be on base or at the plate when the reliever entered to qualify for a save, or the reliever had to preserve a lead of any size for at least three innings in completing a game. The rule was slightly relaxed in 1975 to the current definition as outlined above. Statistical sites, including MLB.com, include saves in pitching records prior to 1969 by retroactively applying the 1969 criteria.

=== Related statistics ===
The ratio of saves to save opportunities is save percentage. A save opportunity (abbr. SVO, or "save situation") occurs when a reliever enters a game in a situation that permits him to earn a save. A pitcher who enters a game in a save situation and does not finish the game, but departs with his team still leading, is not charged with a save opportunity.

If a relief pitcher satisfies all of the criteria for a save except he does not finish the game, he will often be credited with a hold (abbr. H), which is a statistic that is not officially recognized by Major League Baseball.

A blown save (abbr. BS; alternately BSV or B) (Note: An abbreviation of BL may be used to indicate that a reliever was charged with both a blown save and the loss.) occurs when a reliever in a save situation surrenders the lead (allows the tying run, or more, to score). Like the hold, the blown save statistic is not officially recognized by Major League Baseball. The blown save was adopted as part of the points system used by the Rolaids Relief Man Award starting in 1988. If the tying run was scored by a runner who was already on base when the reliever entered the game, the reliever will be charged with a blown save even though the run is charged to the pitcher who allowed that runner to reach base. A reliever cannot blow multiple saves in a game unless he has multiple save opportunities, a situation only possible if the reliever temporarily switches to another defensive position, then returns to pitching.

== Criticism ==
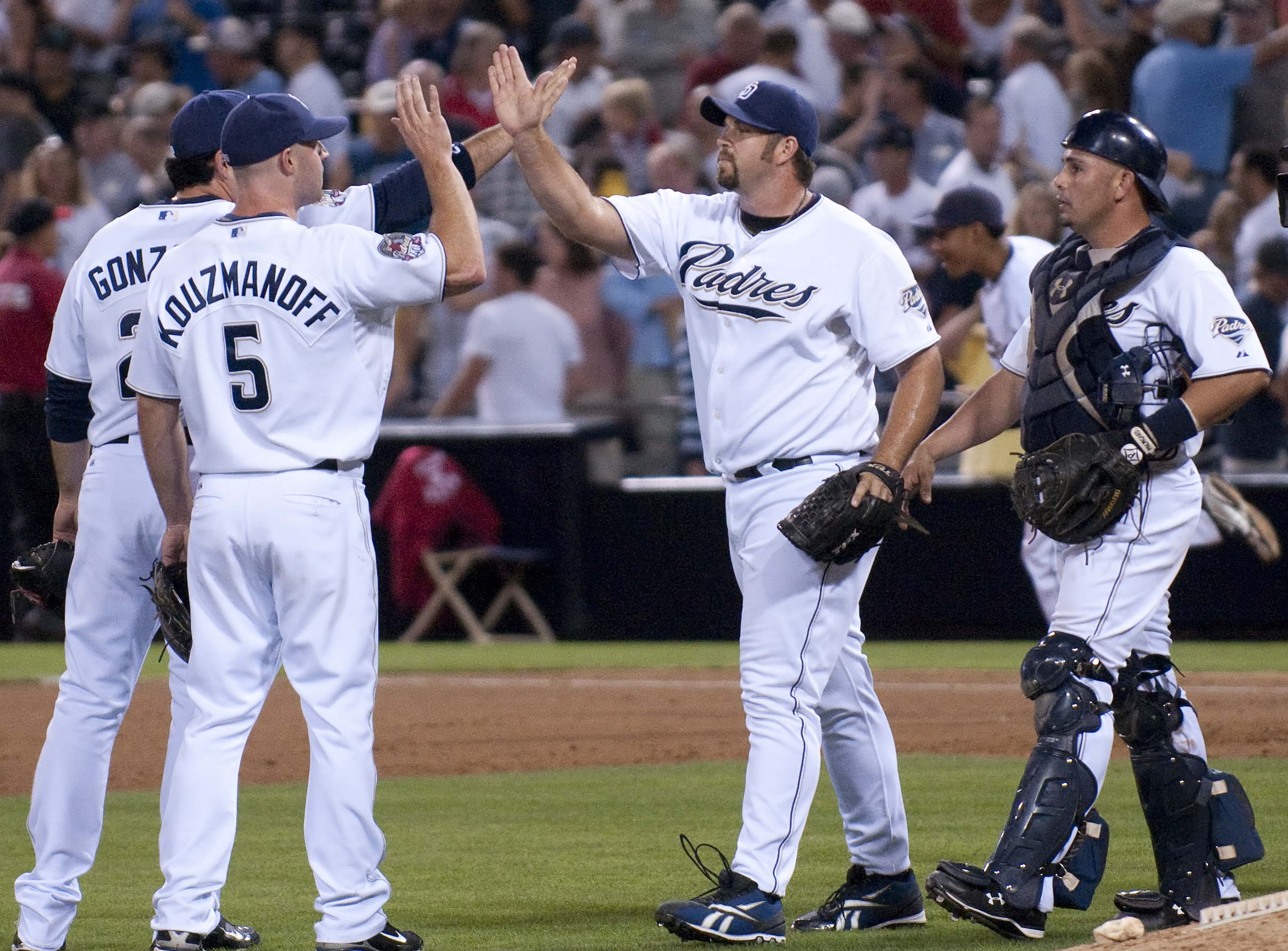
Heath Bell is congratulated by San Diego Padres teammates after a save in 2009

As Francisco Rodríguez pursued the single-season saves record in 2008, Baseball Prospectus member Joe Sheehan, Sports Illustrated writer Tom Verducci, and The New York Sun writer Tim Marchman wrote that Rodríguez's save total was enhanced by the number of opportunities his team presented, allowing him to amass one particular statistic. They thought that Rodríguez on his record-breaking march was less effective than in prior years. Sheehan offered that saves did not account for a pitcher's proficiency at preventing runs nor did it reflect leads that were not preserved.

Bradford Doolittle of The Kansas City Star wrote, "[The closer] is the only example in sports of a statistic creating a job." He decried the best relievers pitching fewer innings starting in the 1980s with their workload being reduced from two- to one-inning outings while less efficient pitchers were pitching those innings instead. ESPN.com columnist Jim Caple has argued that the save statistic has turned the closer position into "the most overrated position in sports.” Caple and others contend that using one's best reliever in situations such as a three-run lead in the ninth—when a team will almost certainly win even with a lesser pitcher—is foolish, and that using a closer in the traditional fireman role exemplified by pitchers such as Goose Gossage is far wiser. (A "fireman" situation is men on base in a tied or close game, hence a reliever ending such a threat is "putting out the fire".)

Firemen frequently pitched two- or three-inning outings to earn saves. The modern closer, reduced to a one-inning role, is available to pitch more save opportunities. In the past, a reliever pitching three innings one game would be unavailable to pitch the next game. Gossage had more saves of at least two innings than saves where he pitched one inning or less. "The times I did a one-inning save, I felt guilty about it. It's like it was too easy,” said Gossage. ESPN.com wrote that saves have not been determined to be "a special, repeatable skill—rather than simply a function of opportunities.” It also noted that blown saves are "non-qualitative", pointing out that both Gossage and Rollie Fingers, who each had over 100 career blown saves, were both inducted into the Baseball Hall of Fame. Fran Zimniuch in Fireman: The Evolution of the Closer in Baseball wrote, "But you have to be a great relief pitcher to blow that many saves. Clearly, [Gossage] saved many, many more than he did not save." More than half of Gossage's and Fingers' blown saves came in tough save situations, where the tying run was on base when the pitcher entered. In nearly half of their blown tough saves, they entered the game in the sixth or seventh inning. Multiple-inning outings provide more chances for a reliever to blow a save. The pitchers need to get out of the initial situation and pitch additional innings with more chances to lose the lead. A study by the Baseball Hall of Fame (Note: The March 2006 study analyzed the career saves of Rollie Fingers, Goose Gossage, Bruce Sutter, Lee Smith, Dennis Eckersley, Trevor Hoffman, and Mariano Rivera. Hoffman and Rivera were still active, and had 436 and 379 career saves, respectively, at that time.) found modern closers were put into fewer tough save situations compared to past relievers. (Note: Tough save opportunities (tough saves + tough blown saves): Fingers (161). Gossage (138), Hoffman (49), Rivera (46).) The modern closer also earned significantly more "easy saves", defined as saves starting the ninth inning with more than a one-run lead. (Note: Easy saves: Hoffman (261), Rivera (235), Fingers (114), Gossage (113).) The study offered "praise to the combatants who faced more danger for more innings".

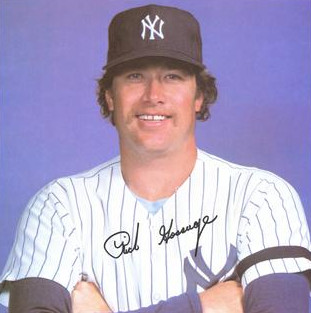
Goose Gossage, namesake of the proposed "goose egg"

Nate Silver of FiveThirtyEight has suggested the "goose egg,” a new statistic that he considers to be a better evaluation of relief performance than the save. A reliever earns a goose egg for each scoreless inning pitched (no earned or unearned runs, no inherited runners score) in the seventh inning or later, where when he starts the inning: the score is tied, his team holds a lead of no more than two runs, or the tying run is on base or at the plate. Should the reliever be charged with an earned run in a goose egg situation, he will be credited with a "broken egg,” the counterpart of the blown save, unless he finishes the game. The statistic is named for Goose Gossage, who is the all-time leader in goose eggs but recorded relatively few saves compared to modern closers.

In the piece in which he introduced the "goose egg" concept, Silver added more criticisms of the save, noting, "It doesn't give a pitcher any additional reward for pitching multiple innings — even though two clutch innings pitched in relief are roughly twice as valuable as one. And a pitcher doesn't get a save for pitching in a tie game, even though it's one of the highest-leverage situations." He also considered saves and blown saves "highly punitive to guys who aren't closers." As an example, Silver noted that in the 2016 season, Chicago White Sox middle reliever Nate Jones, who by Silver's calculations converted 83% of his goose opportunities, led the American League in blown saves with nine, while only recording three saves. Silver added, "The problem is that you can only get a save if you finish the game, whereas blown saves aren't restricted to the final inning."

== Leaders in Major League Baseball ==
=== Saves ===
The statistic was formally introduced in 1969, although research has identified saves earned prior to that point.

Key

Player	Name of the player
Saves	Career saves
Years	The years this player played in the major leagues
†	Elected to the Baseball Hall of Fame
*	Denotes pitcher who is still active
L	Denotes pitcher who is left-handed

==== Most saves in a career ====
The 10 Major League Baseball players with the most saves in a career are:

Regular season
Player	Saves	Years
Mariano Rivera^{†}	652	1995–2013
Trevor Hoffman^{†}	601	1993–2010
Kenley Jansen^{*}	495	2010–present
Lee Smith^{†}	478	1980–1997
Craig Kimbrel^{*}	441	2010–present
Francisco Rodríguez	437	2002–2017
John Franco^{L}	424	1984–2005
Billy Wagner^{L†}	422	1995–2010
Aroldis Chapman^{*}	400	2010–present
Dennis Eckersley^{†}	390	1975–1998

Stats updated through July 27, 2026

==== Progression of career saves leaders ====
The following 14 pitchers have led the major leagues in total saves for a career, since the formation of the National Association of Professional Base Ball Players (NA) in 1871. This table is based on career totals at the end of each baseball season, including retroactive application of the saves definition prior to 1969, when it was first recognized as an official statistic by MLB.

Player	Start		End	
Player	Season	Career saves	Season	Career saves
Harry Wright^{†}	1871	3	1893	14
Tony Mullane	1894	15	1903	15
Kid Nichols^{†}	1899	15	1906	16
Joe McGinnity^{†}	1907	19	1909	24
Mordecai Brown^{†}	1910	26	1925	49
Firpo Marberry	1926	53	1945	99
Johnny Murphy	1946	104	1961	107
Roy Face	1962	118	1963	134
Hoyt Wilhelm^{†}	1964	146	1979	228
Rollie Fingers^{†}	1980	244	1991	341
Jeff Reardon	1992	357	1992	357
Lee Smith^{†}	1993	401	2005	478
Trevor Hoffman^{†}	2006	482	2010	601
Mariano Rivera^{†}	2011	603	incumbent	652

Notes:

- Mullane and Nichols shared the record from 1899 through 1903.
- Mullane pitched both right-handed and left-handed.

==== Most in a single season ====
Below are the Major League Baseball players who have recorded 50 or more saves in a single season.

Regular season
Player	Saves	Team	Year
Francisco Rodríguez	62	Los Angeles Angels of Anaheim	2008
Bobby Thigpen	57	Chicago White Sox	1990
Edwin Díaz^{*}	57	Seattle Mariners	2018
John Smoltz^{†}	55	Atlanta Braves	2002
Éric Gagné	55	Los Angeles Dodgers	2003
Randy Myers^{L}	53	Chicago Cubs	1993
Trevor Hoffman^{†}	53	San Diego Padres	1998
Mariano Rivera^{†}	53	New York Yankees	2004
Éric Gagné	52	Los Angeles Dodgers	2002
Dennis Eckersley^{†}	51	Oakland Athletics	1992
Rod Beck	51	Chicago Cubs	1998
Jim Johnson	51	Baltimore Orioles	2012
Mark Melancon	51	Pittsburgh Pirates	2015
Jeurys Familia	51	New York Mets	2016
Jim Johnson	50	Baltimore Orioles	2013
Craig Kimbrel^{*}	50	Atlanta Braves	2013
Mariano Rivera^{†}	50	New York Yankees	2001

Stats updated through the 2025 season

==== Most consecutive without a blown save ====
Regular season
Player	Saves	Team(s)	Years	Ref
Éric Gagné	84	Los Angeles Dodgers	2002–2004	
Zack Britton^{L*}	60	Baltimore Orioles	2015–2017	
Tom Gordon	54	Boston Red Sox	1998–1999	
Jeurys Familia	52	New York Mets	2015–2016	
José Valverde	51	Detroit Tigers	2010–2011	
John Axford	49	Milwaukee Brewers	2011–2012	
Brad Lidge	47	Houston Astros, Philadelphia Phillies	2007–2009	
Grant Balfour	44	Oakland Athletics	2012–2013	
Brad Ziegler	43	Arizona Diamondbacks	2015–2016	
Rod Beck	41	San Francisco Giants	1993–1995	
Trevor Hoffman^{†}	41	San Diego Padres	1997–1998	
Heath Bell	41	San Diego Padres	2010–2011	

Stats updated through 2019 season

=== Blown saves ===
==== Career ====
The below table lists MLB pitchers who have accrued 80 or more blown saves during their careers.

Regular season
Player	Blown saves	Saves	Save %	Years
Goose Gossage^{†}	112	310	73.5	1972–1994
Rollie Fingers^{†}	109	341	75.8	1968–1985
Jeff Reardon	106	367	77.6	1979–1994
Lee Smith^{†}	103	478	82.3	1980–1997
John Franco^{L}	101	424	80.8	1984–2005
Bruce Sutter^{†}	101	300	74.8	1976–1988
Sparky Lyle^{L}	95	238	71.5	1967–1982
Roberto Hernández	94	326	77.6	1991–2007
Gene Garber	82	218	72.7	1969–1988
Kent Tekulve	81	184	69.4	1974–1989
Gary Lavelle^{L}	81	136	62.7	1974–1987
Mariano Rivera^{†}	80	652	89.1	1995–2013
Mike Timlin	80	141	63.8	1991–2008

Stats updated through 2025 season

==== Single season ====
The below table lists MLB pitchers who have accrued 13 or more blown saves during a single season.

Regular season
Player	Blown saves	Saves	Save %	Team	Year	Ref.
Ron Davis	14	29	67.4	Minnesota Twins	1984	
Rollie Fingers^{†}	14	20	58.8	Oakland Athletics	1976	
Gerry Staley	14	9	39.1	Chicago White Sox	1960	
Bob Stanley	14	33	70.2	Boston Red Sox	1983	
Bruce Sutter^{†}	14	27	65.9	Chicago Cubs	1978	
Goose Gossage^{†}	13	22	62.9	New York Yankees	1983	
John Hiller^{L}	13	13	50.0	Detroit Tigers	1976	
Clay Holmes	13	29	69.0	New York Yankees	2024	
Dan Plesac^{L}	13	23	63.9	Milwaukee Brewers	1987	
Jeff Reardon	13	35	72.9	Montreal Expos	1986	
Dave Righetti^{L}	13	31	70.5	New York Yankees	1987	

Stats updated through 2025 season
