= Pete Palmer =

American baseball statistician and sportswriter

Pete Palmer (born January 30, 1938) is an American sports statistician and encyclopedia editor. He is a major contributor to the applied mathematical field referred to as sabermetrics. Along with the Bill James Baseball Abstracts, Palmer's book The Hidden Game of Baseball is often referred to as providing the foundation upon which the field of sabermetrics was built.

== Baseball work ==
Palmer grew up in Wellesley, Massachusetts, where he was a fan of the Boston Red Sox and a collector of baseball cards.

Palmer graduated from Yale University in 1960 with A. Bartlett Giamatti. He began working for the Raytheon Corporation as a computer programmer and Radar engineer tasked with monitoring for Soviet intrusions along the Distant Early Warning Line. It was during his time at Raytheon that he began working with baseball statistics. At night, after his co-workers had left for the day, Palmer used the company's cutting-edge computers to run advanced simulations analyzing historical baseball statistics.

In 1982, he gained notoriety when he recognized a scorekeeper's error which counted a 1910 Detroit Tigers box score twice, crediting Ty Cobb with an extra two hits and three at-bats. That year Cobb was declared the batting champion, despite an unsuccessful effort by the St. Louis Browns to help Cleveland Naps star Nap Lajoie overtake Cobb. If the double-counted game were to be removed Cobb's average would finish second to Lajoie, though Major League Baseball still lists Cobb as the batting average leader. Palmer also innovated the linear weights method of estimating a player's offensive contributions, an invention that will likely be his lasting legacy. Palmer, with help from Dick Cramer, invented OPS (on-base plus slugging) in 1978, which now is universally accepted as a measure of batting ability.

Palmer met John Thorn at a 1981 SABR convention. Many of Palmer's early works were written in partnership with Thorn, including The Hidden Game of Baseball and Total Baseball; the latter book also featured, in later editions, the contributions of editor Michael Gershman. Palmer edited or served as a consultant for many of the sports reference books produced by Total Sports Publishing. Palmer's most recent work has been in collaboration with Gary Gillette. Since 2003, the pair has produced five editions of the ESPN Baseball Encyclopedia, and several other baseball annuals. In 2010 he was named a charter member of the Henry Chadwick Society by SABR and also received a lifetime achievement award from them in 2018.

== Historical baseball records and Retrosheet ==
Palmer played a role in the early development of Retrosheet, a project established by David W. Smith to collect and computerize historical baseball play-by-play records. When Smith began seeking team scorebooks in 1988, Palmer introduced him to Eddie Epstein, the Baltimore Orioles' director of research and statistics. Epstein helped arrange contact with Orioles public-relations staff, leading to Smith's acquisition of copies of decades of the team's game scoresheets. These records formed an important part of Retrosheet's initial holdings.

Palmer also helped the project obtain historical Boston Red Sox scorebooks. His contacts with the team's public-relations staff, developed in part through his earlier work with the American League's Sports Information Center, contributed to arrangements for copying surviving Red Sox games dating from 1968. He continued assisting Retrosheet with checking historical American League records.

== Football work ==
Palmer has also played a significant role in the field of football statistics. In the seventies, he served as editor for several editions of the A.S. Barnes football encyclopedia. In 1973, he joined the stat crew of the New England Patriots, compiling the official statistics for the team's home games. Palmer continued this task through the 2016 season.

In 1988, Palmer published The Hidden Game of Football, with co-authors Thorn and Bob Carroll. The book was updated and re-released in 1998 and is still considered the seminal work on football analysis. He was also co-editor (with Gillette, Sean Lahman, et al.) of the ESPN Pro Football Encyclopedia.

== Personal life ==
Palmer is married to his wife Beth, together they have three children. Emily, the oldest, Stephen, the youngest, and Daniel. They reside in Hollis, New Hampshire.
