= Alexander Gershman =

Russian American surgeon (born 1961)

Alexander Gershman (born May 26, 1961, in Moscow, Soviet Union) is a Russian American surgeon. He is considered one of the first surgeons in the world to apply the method of laparoscopic surgery and robotic-assisted surgery to urological surgery and is considered one of the world's leading experts on minimally invasive surgery. After many years teaching, researching and conducting clinical studies on laparoscopic surgery throughout the world, Gershman is in private practice in Beverly Hills, California. His client list includes numerous Hollywood celebrities and professional athletes.

== Education ==
After receiving his M.D. degree from Moscow Medical School in 1984 and his Ph.D. degree from the Moscow Research Institute of Urology, he completed a research fellowship at the Cedars-Sinai Medical Center Department of Surgery in 1992 and a clinical fellowship at the UCLA Medical Center Department of Urology in 1993. Since Russian residency training is not valid in the US, he redid urology residency training at UCLA starting in 1993 so that he could work in the USA.

== Academic appointments ==
Gershman holds numerous academic appointments, including: Assistant Clinical Professor at the UCLA School of Medicine Department of Urology and Clinical Faculty at the Harbor-UCLA Medical Center Department of Urology. Between 1990 and 1993 he was previously a visiting professor at major hospitals in Vienna, Vancouver, San Diego, Oslo, Gettengem, and Amsterdam and a Clinical Instructor in laparoscopic surgery at Cedars-Sinai Medical Center.

== Hospital appointments ==
He currently holds numerous hospital appointments, including the following: Clinical Chief of Urology at the Cedars-Sinai Medical Center; Director of Urologic Laparoscopy Division of Urology, Harbor-UCLA Medical Center, Head of Endourology Division, Department of Surgery, VA Greater Los Angeles Healthcare System; Attending Surgeon, Laparoscopic Renal Transplant Surgery St. Mary Medical Center; Attending Surgeon at the Cedars-Sinai Medical Center; and Attending Surgeon at the Harbor-UCLA Medical Center.

== Publications and lectures ==
Gershman has written over 20 published articles and over 50 published scientific abstracts on the subject of laparoscopic surgery and has contributed chapters on the subject of surgery to several medical textbooks.

=== Articles ===
- 1997 Gershman, A., Raz, S.: Bioengineering For Bladders. Newsletter, Department of Urology. UCLA.
- 1995 Gill, I., Kavoussi, L., Clayman, R., McDougal, E., Ehrlich, R., Fuchs, G., Gershman, A.: Complications Of Laparoscopic Nephrectomy: A Multiinstitutional Study. J. Urol.
- 1995 Ehrlich, R., Fuchs, G., Gershman, A.: Laparoscopic Ureteroneocystostomy. J. Urol.
- 1994 Gershman, A., Fuchs, G., Ehrlich, R.: Laparoscopic Vesicoureteroplasty In Children. American Urological Association Annual Meeting 1994, San Francisco, California. J Urol.
- 1994 Ehrlich, R., Fuchs, G., Gershman, A.: Laparoscopic Antireflux Surgery In Children. J. Urol.
- 1993 Ehrlich, R., Fuchs, G., Gershman, A.: Laparoscopic Renal Surgery In Children. J. Urol.
- 1993 Ehrlich, R., Gershman, A.: Laparoscopic Seromyotomy For Non-neurogenic Neurogenic Bladder In A Child. J. Urol.
- 1993 Ehrlich, R., Gershman, A.: Laparoscopic Ureteral Reimplantation. Society for Pediatric Urology Newsletter.
- 1993 Ehrlich, R., Gershman, A.: Operative Laparoscopy In Children. Society for Pediatric Urology Newsletter.
- 1993 Phillips, E., Carrol, B., Gershman, A.: Removal Of Common Duct Stones Using Laparoscopic Technique. J Gastroenterology, Germany.
- 1992 Ehrlich, R., Raz, S., Gershman, A., Fuchs, G.: Laparoscopic Nephrectomy In A Child: Expending Horizons Of Laparoscopy In Pediatric Urology. J. Endourology.
- 1992 Gershman, A., Reznik, G.: Percutaneous Endoscopic Implantation of Automatic Implantable Cardioverter/Defibrillator (AICD). J. Laparoendoscopic Surgery.
- 1992 Gershman, A., Reznik, G.: Implantable Cardioverter Defibrillator Lead Systems: Current and Future Directions. Cardio.
- 1992 Ehrlich, R., Gershman, A.: Laparoscopic Nephrectomy In Children: Society for Pediatric Urology Newsletter.
- 1991 Gershman, A., Chandra, M., Grundfest, W.: Laser Induced Fluorescent Spectroscopy Of Malignant And Inflammatory Prostate In Vitro. SPIE.
- 1991 Gershman, A., Chandra, M., Daykhovsky, L., Grundfest, W. Technical Parameters For Angioscopy: Critical Elements For Effective Instrumentation. SPIE.
- 1990 Gershman, A., Grundfest, W., Daykhovsky, L.: Laparoscopic Cholecystectomy: Instrumentation And Technique. J. Laparoendoscopic Surgery.
- 1990 Gershman, A., Danoff, D., Grundfest, W., Chandra, M., Daykhovsky, L.: Laparoscopic Pelvic Lymphadenectomy. J. Laparoendoscopic Surgery.
- 1989 Gershman, A., Morozov, A.: Functional Results Of Anatrophic Iephrolythotomy In Treatment Of Staghorn Nephrolythiasis. Journal of Urology Nephrology, Moscow.
- 1989 Gershman, A., Morozov, A.: Several Unrolled Questions In Surgical Management Of Staghorn Nephrolythiasis. Journal of Urology, Moscow.
- 1989 Gershman, A.: Lipid Peroxidation In The Murine Renal Tissue Homogenates Under Heat Ischimia In The Presence Or Absence Of Corticosteroid Protection. Journal of Urology Nephrology, Moscow.

=== Scientific abstracts ===
- 1998 Gershman, A.; Ram-Liebig, G., Fuchs, G., Raz, S.: Endoscopic Submucosal Implantation of Permanent Suture Material For The Treatment Of Urinary Incontinence. Western Section AUA.
- 1998 Gershman, A., Ram-Liebig, G., Fuchs, G., Raz, S.: Bladder Wall Replacement Using Biologically Engineered Membranes. Western Section AUA, Hawaii.
- 1997 Gershman, A., Ram Leibig, G., Fuchs, G., Raz, S.: Bladder Wall Replacement Using Biologically Engineered Membrane. J. Endourology.
- 1997 Gershman, A., Ram Liebig, G., Fuchs, G., Raz, S.: Endoscopic Submucosal Implantation of Permanent Suture Material For The Potential Treatment Of Urinary Incontinence. J. Endourology.
- 1995 Fuchs, G., Gershman A., David, R., Patel, A., Ehrlich, R.: Transabdominal Bilateral And Unilateral Nephrectomy In Adults. American Urological Association Annual Meeting, Las Vegas.
- 1995 Fuchs, G., Gershman, A., David, R., Ehrlich, R.: Laparoscopic Nephrectomy In Adults: Discussion Of Different Approaches and Lessons Learned. J. Endourology.
- 1995 Fuchs, G., Gershman, A., David, R., Patel, A., Ehrlich, R.: Transabdominal Unit And Bilateral Laparoscopic Nephrectomy In Adults. J. Urology.
- 1994 Gershman, A., Fuchs, G., Ehrlich, R.: Laparoscopic Nephrectomy In Pediatrics. American Urological Association Annual Meeting 1994, San Francisco, California. J. Urol.
- 1994 Ehrlich, R., Gershman, A., Fuchs, G.: Laparoscopic Vesicoureteroplasty In Children: Initial Case Report. J. Urol.
- 1994 Gill, I., Kavoussi, L., Clayman, R., McDougall, E., Ehrlich, R., Fuchs, G., Gershman, A.:Complications Of Laparoscopic Nephrectomy. Multiinstitutional Study. J Endourology.
- 1994 Fuchs, G., Gershman, A., Rosenthal, T.: Transabdominal Laparoscopic Bilateral Nephrectomy; The UCLA Experience. J. Endourology.
- Morris, B., Fuchs, G., Ehrlich, R., Gershman, A.:Laparoscopic Treatment Of The Renal Cysts. J. Endourology.
- 1994 Fuchs, G., Gershman, A., David, R., Ehrlich, R.: Transabdominal Laparoscopic Nephrectomy in Adults. J. Endourology.
- 1993 Gershman, A., Danoff, D., Holden, S., Fuchs, G.: Complications of Laparoscopic Pelvic Lymphadenectomy. SPIE.
- 1993 Gershman, A., Fuchs, G., Ehrlich, R.: Laparoscopic Nephrectomy in Adults. 11th World Congress of Endourology, Italy.
- 1993 Pang, K., David, R., Gershman, A., Fuchs, G.: Treatment Of Stones In Caliceal Diverticula Using Retrograde Approach: Critical Assessment After 4 Years. American Urologic Association. San Antonio, Texas.
- 1993 Ehrlich, R., Gershman, A., Fuchs, G., Mee, S.: Expending Horizons in Pediatric Laparoscopy. American Urologic Association. San Antonio, Texas.
- 1993 Fuchs, G., David, R., Pang, K., Gershman, A.: Five-Year Experience with Electrohydrolic Lithotripsy For Complex Stones In The Ureter. American Urologic Association. San Antonio, Texas.
- 1993 Gershman, A., Fuchs, G.: Problem Solving In Laparoscopic Surgery. Video Urology, 5th World Congress, Florida.
- 1993 Fuchs, G., Gershman, A., Ehrlich, R.: Laparoscopic Renal Surgery In Pediatrics. Video Urology, 5th World Congress, Florida.
- 1993 Gershman, A., Holden, S., Fuchs, G.: Laparoscopic Treatment Of Lymphocele. Video Urology, 5th World Congress, Florida.
- 1993 Gershman, A., Fuchs, G., Ehrlich, R.: Laparoscopic Nephrectomy. Western Section American Urologic Association.
- 1993 Gershman, A., Ehrlich, R., Danoff, D., Fuchs, G.: Recognition and Management Of Complications In Laparoscopic Surgery. Western Section American Urologic Association.
- 1993 Gershman, A., Fuchs, G.: Tissue Approximation in Laparoscopic Surgery. Western Section American Urologic Association.
- 1993 Gershman, A., Fuchs, G., Ehrlich, R.: Pediatric Laparoscopic Renal Surgery. American Urologic Association Western Section.
- 1993 Ehrlich, R., Fuchs, G., Gershman, A.: Laparoscopic Renal Surgery In Pediatrics. GU Surgeons, Phoenix, Arizona.
- 1993 Gershman, A., Fuchs, G.: Principals Of Tissue Approximation In Laparoscopic Surgery. American Urologic Association. San Antonio, Texas.
- 1992 Fuchs, G., Gershman, A., Ehrlich, R.: Pediatric Laparoscopic Surgery. J. Endourology.
- 1992 Fuchs, G., Barbaric, Z., David, R., Pang, K., Gershman, A.: Renal Ablation By Retrograde Intrarenal Reflux Of Ethanol. J. Endourology.
- 1992 Gershman, A.: Role Of Laparoscopic Pelvic Lymphadenectomy In The Diagnosis Of Prostate Cancer. American College of Surgeons.
- 1992 Gershman, A.: Advanced Laparoscopy in Urology. American College of Surgeons.
- 1992 Gershman, A., Reznik, G., Grundfest, W.: New Thoracoscopic Approach To The Epicardial Surface And Its Application In The Percutaneous Implantation Of Automatic Implantable Cardioverter/Defibrillator (AICD) Lead System. American College of Surgeons.
- 1992 Gershman, A, Fuchs, G., Ehrlich, R.: Pediatric Laparoscopic Surgery. 10th World Congress of Endourology and ESWL.
- 1992 Gershman, A., Fuchs, G.: Problem Solving In Laparoscopic Surgery In Urology: Society for Minimally Invasive Therapy. Dublin, Ireland.
- 1992 Gershman, A., Reznik, G: Thoracoscopic Approach to The Pericardial Surface. Society for Minimally Invasive Therapy. Dublin, Ireland.
- 1992 Gershman, A., Danoff, D., Holden, S.: Role Of Laparoscopic Pelvic Node Dissection In The Diagnosis And Treatment Of Prostate Cancer: Alternative Approaches In The Treatment Of Prostate Cancer. Society for Minimally Invasive Therapy. Dublin, Ireland.
- 1992 Gershman, A., Danoff, D., Holden, S., Fuchs, G.; Advantages of Laparoscopic Varicocelectomy. Society for Minimally Invasive Therapy. Dublin, Ireland.
- 1992 Gershman, A., Danoff, D., Ehrlich, R., Fuchs, G.: Laparoscopic Treatment of the Renal Cyst. Society for Minimally Invasive Therapy. Dublin, Ireland.
- 1992 Gershman, A., Fuchs, G.: Principals Of Tissue Approximation In Laparoscopic Surgery. Society for Minimally Invasive Therapy. Dublin, Ireland.
- 1992 Gershman, A., Reznik, G.: Percutaneous Endoscopic Implantation of AICD. American Heart Association. Anaheim, California.
- 1991 Phillips, E., Daykhovsky, L., Gershman, A.: Laparoscopic Cholecystectomy: Clinical Experience Of 100 Patients. SPIE.
- 1991 Gershman, A., Danoff, D.: Development of New Laparoscopic Techniques In Intra-abdominal Surgery. SPIE.
- 1991 Gershman, A., Daykhovsky, L., Grundfest, W.: Laparoscopic Cholecystectomy: Required Equipment And Technical Details. SPIE.
- 1991 Gershman, A.: Laparoscopic Procedures In Urology And General Surgery. International Symposium of Colorectal Surgery, Moscow, Russia.
- 1991 Gershman, A.: Our Technique of Laparoscopic Pelvic Lymphadenectomy. Ninth World Congress of Endourology, Vienna, Austria.
- 1991 Gershman, A.: Advanced Laparoscopic Surgery in Urology. Ninth Congress of International Society for Laser Surgery and Medicine.
- 1991 Gershman, A., Holden, S., Sacks, S.: Role Of Laparoscopic Pelvic Lymphadenectomy In Diagnosis And Treatment Of Prostate Cancer. Third International Meeting of Society for Minimally Invasive Therapy. Boston.

=== Seminars ===
He has taught hundreds of scientific and continued education seminars in the United States, Canada and Europe, including delivering keynote addresses, at the annual meetings of the American Urological Association, the British Association of Urological Surgeons and the World Congress of Endourology and ESWL.

== Clinical research and grants ==
Gershman has conducted numerous clinical studies and trials for major pharmaceutical companies, including GlaxoSmith Kline, Eli Lilly and Company and Ingenix. He has also been awarded numerous educational and research grants.

== Membership ==
- 2002 American Russian Medical And Dental Association of Los Angeles, President
- 1993 American Urological Association, Member
- 1993 American Medical Association, Member
- 1993 Los Angeles Urological Society, Member
- 1991 International Society for Minimally Invasive Therapy, Member
- 1990 European Association for Endoscopic Surgery and Other Interventional Techniques, Member
- 1986 Urologic Association of Russia, Member

== Awards ==
Gershman's awards include prizes awarded by the Los Angeles Urological Society and the Solomon Scholars Resident Research Program.

== Media ==
Gershman can be seen on Season Two, Episode 3 of Million Dollar Listing.
