= Jerome Holtzman =

American sportswriter and U.S. Marine (1926–2008)

- Born: July 12, 1926; Chicago, Illinois, U.S.
- Died: July 19, 2008 (aged 82); Evanston, Illinois, U.S.
- Occupations: Sportswriter, author
- Known for: MLB official historian (1999–2008)
- Awards: J. G. Taylor Spink Award (1991) Red Smith Award (1997)

Jerome Holtzman (July 12, 1926 – July 19, 2008) was an American sportswriter known for his writings on baseball who served as the official historian for Major League Baseball (MLB) from 1999 until his death.

== Newspaper career ==
Born in Chicago, Illinois, Holtzman wrote for his hometown papers for over 50 years. Beginning as a copyboy at the Chicago Daily News in 1943, Holtzman wrote for the paper through its merger with the Chicago Sun. His influence and viewpoints made him something of a legend among newspapermen. Southern humorist Lewis Grizzard, who was sports editor of the Sun-Times for part of Holtzman's career, called him "the dean of American baseball writers," and went on to say "He never smiled, but he had the keys to Cooperstown. No major leaguer ever got into the Hall of Fame if Holtzman didn't want him there. He had tremendous sources. He was writing about the possibility of a baseball players union and a baseball players strike long before anyone else." Holtzman left the Sun-Times in 1981 for the Chicago Tribune, remaining there until his retirement in 1999.

Holtzman was awarded the 1991 J. G. Taylor Spink Award by the Baseball Writers' Association of America (BBWAA). He was honored by the Associated Press Sports Editors in 1997, who awarded him the Red Smith Award, which is America's most prestigious sports writing honor. He was elected to the National Sportscasters and Sportswriters Association Hall of Fame in 2004 and the International Jewish Sports Hall of Fame in 2005.

Among Holtzman's contributions to the game during his career was the creation of the save statistic in 1959. It was adopted as an official statistic for the 1969 season, the first official new statistic since the run batted in (RBI) in 1920.

On July 15, 2008, Holtzman suffered a stroke in Evanston, Illinois, and died on July 19.

== Official historian ==
In 1999, Holtzman retired as a newspaper writer and was named the official historian of Major League Baseball. He wrote occasional columns on the MLB.com website. In 2001, Holtzman decided to revert to counting walks in 1887 as hits, reviving an old debate; 1887 was the only season in which walks were counted as hits, an experiment which proved unpopular, but Holtzman took the point of view that once something is counted as a hit it must always remain so. Revised statistics appeared in the seventh edition of Total Baseball, then the official encyclopedia of Major League Baseball. Holtzman's successor as MLB historian John Thorn, noting the move years later, stated "Today Holtzman’s edict is observed largely in the breach."

== Books ==
Holtzman wrote or edited more than a dozen books, including No Cheering in the Press Box, a collection of interviews with 18 sportswriters that was published in 1974. A revised edition in 1995 added interviews with six new subjects. Among his other notable books are The Commissioners, which contained biographies of baseball's commissioners and a history of the office, and Baseball Chicago Style, a history of the Chicago Cubs and Chicago White Sox.
