= Bob Carroll (author) =

American historian and sportswriter (1936–2009)

Robert Nuehardt Carroll Jr. (July 10, 1936 – August 25, 2009) was an American sportswriter and sports historian.

Carroll was best known for his contributions to American football research. He was the founder and executive director of the Professional Football Researchers Association (PFRA), and edited the group's newsletter, The Coffin Corner, until his death in 2009. He was co-author of The Hidden Game of Football (with John Thorn and Pete Palmer), as well as Total Football: The Official Encyclopedia of the National Football League.

Carroll was the author of more than twenty books, most notably Pro Football: When the Grass Was Real and Baseball Between the Lies. His non-sports books included The Importance of Napoleon and The Battle of Stalingrad.

Carroll was born in Wheeling, West Virginia. He was an art and English teacher at McKeesport High School in McKeesport, Pennsylvania.
