= Suzy Gershman =

American travel guide writer (1948– 2012)

Suzy Gershman (April 13, 1948 – July 25, 2012) was an American writer who authored sixteen "Born to Shop" guidebooks over the course of twenty-six years, beginning in 1986. Her travel guides, which covered the shopping scenes in counties and cities, including Paris and New York, had sold more than four million copies as of 2012. At the time of her death, six guidebooks were revised and republished every two years: France, Hong Kong, Italy, London, Paris, and New York City.

Gershman's diet book How To Take 20 Pounds Off Your Man was featured in a "Diet Book Club Deep Dive" on the podcast Maintenance Phase, co-hosted by Aubrey Gordon and former You're Wrong About host Michael Hobbes. The podcast called the book "a manual for creep behavior masquerading as a diet book".

== Biography ==
Gershman was born Suzy Kalter on April 13, 1948, to Gloria and S. S. Kalter in Syracuse, New York. She received a bachelor's degree in Russian history and language from the University of Texas at Austin in 1969. Kalter moved to New York City, where she worked in advertising and public relations. There she met her future husband, writer Michael Gershman, while working in New York. The couple married in 1975 and remained together until his death in 2000.

Gershman and Kalter moved to Los Angeles. She worked for People Magazine and began appearing on talk shows during the 1980s. Kalter took her husband's last name in 1986, when she began publishing the first of her "Born To Shop" books. She also contributed pieces to other publications, including the Los Angeles Times and The New York Times.

She moved to Paris following her husband's death in 2000. In 2004, she released her memoir about her experience as a widow entitled C'est la Vie.

Gershman died from cancer in San Antonio, Texas, on July 25, 2012, at the age of 64. She was survived by her son Aaron; her brother, Steven Kalter; and a granddaughter.
