= Win probability =

Win probability is a statistical tool which suggests a sports team's chances of winning at any given point in a game, based on the performance of historical teams in the same situation. The art of estimating win probability involves choosing which pieces of context matter. Baseball win probability estimates often include whether a team is home or away, inning, number of outs, which bases are occupied, and the score difference. Because baseball proceeds batter by batter, each new batter introduces a discrete state. There are a limited number of possible states, and so baseball win probability tools usually have enough data to make an informed estimate.

American football win probability estimates often include whether a team is home or away, the down and distance, score difference, time remaining, and field position. American football has many more possible states than baseball with far fewer games, so football estimates have a greater margin of error. The first win probability analysis was done in 1971 by Robert E. Machol and former NFL quarterback Virgil Carter.

As a brief example, guessing that each team playing at home will win is based on home advantage. This guess uses a single contextual factor and involves a very large number of games. But with only one factor, the accuracy of this guess is limited to home advantage itself (about 55–70% across sports) and does not change within the game based on in-game factors.

Win probability added is the change in win probability, often how a play or team member affected the probable outcome of the game.

== Research ==
Research work includes measuring the accuracy of win probability estimates, as well as quantifying the uncertainty in individual estimates. That is, if a tool estimates a 24% win probability because 24% of previous teams in that situation won their games, do future teams win at the same 24% rate? Estimating from hidden data uses testing tools like cross-validation.

While many models involve frequency analysis of past events, other models use Bayesian processes.

Some models include a measure of teams' strength coming into the game, while others assume every team is average. Including strength estimates increases the number of possible states, and therefore decreases an estimate's power while possibly increasing its accuracy.
