= Robert Creamer =

American sportswriter (1922–2012)

Robert W. Creamer
- Creamer in 1991
- Born: July 14, 1922; Bronxville, New York, U.S.
- Died: July 18, 2012 (aged 90); Saratoga Springs, New York, U.S.
- Education: Fordham University; Syracuse University
- Occupations: Sportswriter, editor
- Employer: Sports Illustrated (1954–1985)
- Spouse: Margaret Schelz (m. 1948; died 2001)
- Children: 5
- Writing career
- Notable works: Babe: The Legend Comes to Life; Stengel: His Life and Times
- Notable awards: Henry Chadwick Award (2012)

Robert Watts Creamer (July 14, 1922 – July 18, 2012) was an American sportswriter and editor. He spent most of his career at Sports Illustrated.

Appointed Village Historian of Tuckahoe, NY by the Village Trustees on April 9, 1984.

== Early life and education ==
Creamer was born on July 14, 1922, in Bronxville, New York and grew up in Tuckahoe, New York. He attended Fordham and Syracuse Universities but never graduated.

During World War II, he fought in Germany and was wounded. During Operation Bodenplatte, the German Luftwaffe's last offensive operation, Creamer was on the ground watching the aerial combat around him. A German Bf 109 fighter roared in to make a strafing run on Creamer's position. Creamer ducked behind a mound of dirt, then pulled out his .45 pistol and fired at the German plane. Creamer described it as trying "to hit a fly with a BB gun." Following his discharge, he worked in advertising as a copywriter and at Collier's Encyclopedia as an assistant editor.

== Career ==
Creamer was one of the first hired on the staff of Sports Illustrated in 1954. He served the magazine as a senior editor from inception to 1984, and wrote the weekly Scorecard section of the magazine. He also wrote for The New York Times.

As an author, Creamer wrote what many consider the definitive biography of Babe Ruth, titled Babe: The Legend Comes to Life, in 1974. Reviewing the book for The New York Times Book Review, Roger Angell wrote that Ruth had "at last found the biographer he deserves in Robert Creamer."

Creamer wrote seven other baseball related books, including a biography on Casey Stengel titled Stengel: His Life and Times in 1984. Additionally, he co-wrote several autobiographies and books, notably with Ralph Houk, sportscaster Red Barber and umpire Jocko Conlan. He also wrote Baseball in '41: A Celebration of the "Best Baseball Season Ever" (1991). Creamer's lone novel, A Resemblance to Persons Living and Dead, is loosely based on politics, personages, and the environs of Tuckahoe and the town of Eastchester, New York.

In retirement, Creamer occasionally wrote retrospective articles for SI and could be seen on television commenting on historical moments in sports, many of which he had covered. Creamer was a recipient of the 2012 Henry Chadwick Award from the Society for American Baseball Research (SABR). He also appeared in Ken Burns' documentary Baseball and numerous other television baseball programs, including When It Was a Game.

== Personal life and death ==
Creamer was married to Margaret Schelz for 53 years, from 1948 until her death in 2001. The couple had five children together: sons James, Tom, John, and his daughter, Ellen.

Creamer died of prostate cancer on July 18, 2012, in Saratoga Springs, New York. He was survived by his companion Barbara Eaton (died 2019) and his five children, as well as six grandchildren.

== Written Works ==
=== By Creamer ===
- Babe: The Legend Comes to Life (1974)
- Stengel: His Life and Times (1984)
- Baseball in '41: A Celebration of the "Best Baseball Season Ever" (1991)

=== Co-authored with others ===
- The Quality of Courage: Heroes In and Out of Baseball (with Mickey Mantle; 1964)
- Rhubarb in the Catbird Seat (with Red Barber; 1968)
- Jocko (with Jocko Conlan; 1967)
- Season of Glory: The Amazing Saga of the 1961 New York Yankees (with Ralph Houk; 1988)

=== Novel ===
- A Resemblance to Persons Living and Dead (2000)
