= Sean Lahman =

American sportswriter

Sean Lahman (born June 9, 1968) (pronounced "lay-men") is an author and journalist. He is currently a reporter for the USA Today Network and Rochester Democrat and Chronicle and frequently makes public appearances to speak about database journalism, data mining and open-source databases.

== Baseball database ==
He is most noted for the Lahman Baseball Database, a collection of baseball statistics for every team and player in Major League history. Starting in 1995, he made this database freely available for download from the Internet, helping to launch a new era of baseball research by making the raw data available to everyone. In addition to fostering research, the Lahman Database also made it possible for baseball simulation games, such as Baseball Mogul and Out of the Park Baseball, to recreate historical seasons from actual baseball history.

In the mid-1990s, Lahman created the first online baseball encyclopedia at his Baseball Archive website. He later sold the website to Total Sports and became senior editor for that company's print publishing division. The encyclopedia disappeared from the web when Total Sports declared bankruptcy. It was later reborn as Baseball-Reference.com, and Lahman resurrected the Baseball Archive website as a platform to continue the free distribution of his database.

In October 2024, SABR announced that Lahman had donated the database to them, calling it "a keystone in our community" and "a research tool that has aided the work of millions of researchers." SABR announced that it planned to continue to update the database and make it available for free online every year.

== Other data projects ==
Since 2011, he has worked for the Society for American Baseball Research to coordinate data collection projects, including an effort to build a database for minor league baseball Since 2021, Lahman has taught a course on working with baseball databases as part of the annual SABR Analytics Conference. Lahman served on a task force that made recommendations on which Black leagues from baseball’s segregated era should be recognized as major leagues.

Lahman's efforts to document the statistical history of sports have gone beyond baseball. During the 1990s and 2000s, he edited or contributed to the definitive encyclopedias for baseball, professional football, professional basketball, and tennis. In the late 1990s, Lahman launched the Football Project, an effort to collect, digitize, and distribute play-by-play accounts from NFL games back to 1920. In 2010, he served on a "blue ribbon" panel assembled by NFL Films for the ten-part documentary series called The Top 100: NFL's Greatest Players. He has also appeared as a guest on the MLB Network show "Behind the Seams."

== Books ==
From 1998 to 2007, Lahman was an editor or contributor to more than a dozen sports encyclopedias, including:

- three editions of Total Baseball: The Official Encyclopedia of Major League Baseball
- five editions of the ESPN Baseball Encyclopedia
- two editions of the ESPN Pro Football Encyclopedia
- Total Tennis: The Ultimate Tennis Encyclopedia
- Total Basketball: The Ultimate Basketball Encyclopedia
- two editions of Baseball: The Biographical Encyclopedia

In addition to these encyclopedias, Lahman has written several other books on sports history. He created the annual Pro Football Prospectus in 2002 and produced the first three editions in the series. His 2008 book The Pro Football Historical Abstract received the Nelson Ross Award, presented annually for "outstanding achievement in pro football research and historiography" by the Pro Football Researchers Association.

== Newspaper and other work ==
Lahman has worked as a database reporter for the Rochester Democrat and Chronicle since 2010, where he has been a part of statewide and national investigative reporting teams for the USA Today Network. His work has won awards in a variety of disciplines, including feature writing, business reporting, spot news, and state government reporting. His 2018 reporting on New York Governor Andrew Cuomo's campaign fundraising won the Associated Press First Amendment award.

He has also won awards for his reporting on gun violence and the sexual abuse of children by Catholic priests.

Lahman was a senior editor for Total Sports Publishing from 1999 to 2001. He later served as a sports reporter for the New York Sun from 2003 until the paper's demise in 2008.
