= David Neft =

American writer and historian (born 1937)

David S. Neft (born January 9, 1937) is an American writer and historian who creates sports encyclopedias.

== Early career ==
Neft was born in New York City, received a BA, MBA, and PhD (Statistics) from Columbia University, and worked as chief statistician for the polling company Louis Harris & Associates from 1963 to 1965.

== Big Mac ==
In 1965, he was the treasurer and director of research for a company formed by S. Paul Funkhouser, Jr. called Information Concepts, Inc. (ICI) and headed the first effort to compile a computerized database of baseball statistics. The task took more than three years, as Neft and a team of researchers travelled across the country to fill the gaping holes in baseball's statistical and biographical records. The resulting work was published in 1969 by the Macmillan Publishing Company. Although the official title was The Baseball Encyclopedia, the massive book was generally referred to as "Big Mac". It was a quantum leap from early baseball encyclopedias, with a breadth and depth that far exceeded anything that had come before it.

== Sports Encyclopedia series ==
Neft left ICI in 1970, spending the next few years developing dice-based sports games for Sports Illustrated Enterprises. He returned to the sports reference field when he founded Sports Products, Inc. with partner Richard M. Cohen. The company produced a new baseball encyclopedia in 1974 called "The Sports Encyclopedia: Baseball". That same year, they published groundbreaking new encyclopedias for football (The Sports Encyclopedia: Pro Football) and basketball (The Sports Encyclopedia: Pro Basketball).

The baseball encyclopedia has been updated each spring, with the 27th edition appearing in 2007. Seventeen editions of the football encyclopedia were published (the last in 1998). The basketball encyclopedia was published until 1992, a total of five editions.

Beside this line of encyclopedias, Neft edited more than a dozen other sports books.

== Pre-1933 football research ==
In 1978, Neft & Cohen published Pro Football: The Early Years, a startling new look at professional football before 1933. Because the National Football League hadn't kept official statistics in its first thirteen seasons, knowledge of the period was extremely limited. Neft led a team of researchers that meticulously reconstructed the statistical record using box scores, play-by-play accounts, and game stories from local newspapers. The result was a remarkable new look at the teams and players from the NFL's earliest seasons.

== Gannett ==
Neft returned to Harris, then owned by Gannett, in 1977, serving as executive vice president. In 1985, he became Gannett's director of research, a position he held until his retirement in 2002. He is widely recognized within the newspaper industry as a market research expert.
