= Leonard Koppett =

Soviet-born American sportswriter (1923–2003)

- Born: Leonid Kopeliovitch; September 15, 1923; Moscow, Russian SFSR, U.S.S.R.
- Died: June 22, 2003 (aged 79); San Francisco, California, U.S.
- Education: Columbia University (B.A.)
- Occupations: Sportswriter, Author
- Spouse: Suzanne Silberstein (m. 1964)
- Children: 2
- Writing career
- Notable awards: J. G. Taylor Spink Award (1992)

Leonard J. Koppett (born Leonid Kopeliovitch; September 15, 1923 – June 22, 2003) was a Soviet-born American sportswriter and author who wrote 17 books on sports, mainly baseball.

Born in Moscow as Leonid Kopeliovitch, Koppett moved with his family from the Soviet Union to the United States when he was five years old. They lived in The Bronx, New York, a block away from Yankee Stadium.

Koppett served in the United States Army before graduating from Columbia University in 1946. He then worked as a reporter and columnist for the New York Herald Tribune, the New York Post, The New York Times, the Peninsula Times Tribune, and The Sporting News, and authored 22 books on sports. He also published a number of magazine articles.

Best known were his works on baseball: Concise History of Major League Baseball (1998, updated through 2004) and The Thinking Fan's Guide to Baseball (originally titled A Thinking Man's Guide to Baseball, 1967, renamed for gender neutrality and updated several times through 2004) are considered definitive works on the game. The former was inspired by Koppett's conversations with contemporary athletes who had little or no knowledge about the history of their game and the great players of decades past, while the latter memorably began with a one-word paragraph — "Fear." — and then explored how the batter's instinctive fear of the thrown pitch is the key point around which most other aspects of baseball play are derived.

The Essence of the Game is Deception: Thinking about Basketball took a similar approach to basketball.

== Contributions to baseball historical research ==
In 1992, sportswriter Leonard Koppett assisted Retrosheet, an organization founded to preserve and computerize historical baseball play-by-play accounts. He allowed Retrosheet volunteers David and Sherri Nichols to copy his collection of scorebooks, containing more than 1,600 major-league games. Retrosheet founder David W. Smith also supplied Koppett with statistical reports compiled from computerized play-by-play data.

Koppett subsequently helped Smith establish connections with the San Francisco Giants. His support, alongside that of baseball researcher Bill Arnold, helped persuade the club to share its historical scorebooks. Koppett and Arnold also helped introduce Retrosheet to former San Francisco Chronicle sportswriter Bob Stevens, whose scorebook collection was copied by Retrosheet in 1992.

== Later years ==
Two weeks prior to his death, Koppett completed his final book, The Rise and Fall of the Press Box, which is part autobiography and part memoir about changes in sports media coverage since World War II when he became a sportswriter.

Koppett received the J. G. Taylor Spink Award in 1992 and the Curt Gowdy Media Award by the Basketball Hall of Fame in 1994.

According to his daughter Katherine Koppett Richter, shortly before his death at age 79 in San Francisco, Koppett commented, "Every decade of my life has been better than the decade before."

== Bibliography ==
- A Thinking Fan's Guide to Baseball (1967)
- 24 Seconds to Shoot: The Birth and Improbable Rise of the National Basketball Association (1968)
- The New York Mets: The Whole Story (1970)
- All About Baseball (1973)
- The Essence of the Game is Deception: Thinking about Basketball (1974)
- Sports Illusion, Sports Reality: A Reporter's View of Sports, Journalism, and Society (1981)
- The New York Times Guide to Spectator Sports (1971)
- The New York times at the Super Bowl (1974)
- The Man In The Dugout: Baseball's Top Managers and How They Got That Way (1993)
- Koppett's Concise History of Major League Baseball (1998)
- The Rise and Fall of the Press Box (2003)
