= John Thorn (baseball historian) =

American writer and baseball historian (born 1947)

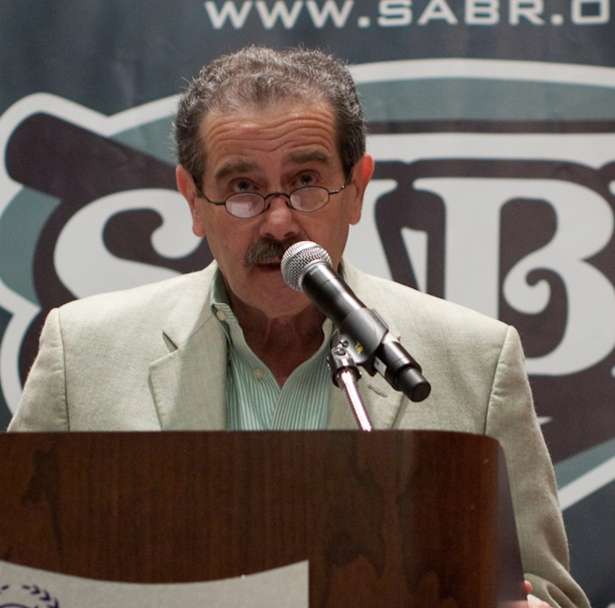
- Thorn in August 2010
- Born: April 17, 1947 (age 79); Stuttgart, Germany
- Education: Beloit College
- Occupations: Author, historian, publisher
- Spouse: Erica Freudenberger
- Children: 3
- Writing career
- Language: English
- Genres: Sports, history, cultural affairs
- Subjects: Baseball, football, basketball, New York, history

John Abraham Thorn (born April 17, 1947) is a German-born American sports historian, author, and publisher. Since 2011, he has served as the Official Baseball Historian for Major League Baseball.

== Early life ==
Thorn was born in Stuttgart, Germany, in a displaced person's camp to which his Polish Jewish parents had come as refugees. Less than two years after Thorn was born, his family emigrated to the United States, and initially settled in the Bronx, New York.

Of his love for baseball, Thorn said: "I fell in love with [baseball] cards before I loved the game, when I discovered that baseball was something that all the kids on my street corner cared about. ... I was an immigrant kid and was looking for a way into America. With my background I saw myself as an underdog, and so Brooklyn had to be my team. I began watching the game seriously when I was eight, in 1955, on my Admiral television, but I had already begun to follow their exploits in the daily newspapers my father brought home with him each night."

As a teen, he played baseball and basketball at Richmond Hill High School. However, at age 19 he suffered a stroke. "It was severe," he said, "knocking out my left-side function for months as well as patches of personal memory—though not the powerful visual memory I retain for images and facts and statistics." The stroke left him with a limp and precluded his further participation in athletic activities.

Thorn attended Beloit College, from which he graduated in 1968.

== Writings ==
Thorn is the author and editor of numerous books, including Total Baseball: The Official Encyclopedia of Major League Baseball, Total Football: The Official Encyclopedia of Major League Football, Treasures of the Baseball Hall of Fame, The Hidden Game of Baseball, The Glory Days: New York Baseball 1947–1957, and The Armchair Book of Baseball. His 2011 book, Baseball in the Garden of Eden: The Secret History of the Early Game, published by Simon & Schuster, was an in-depth chronicle of the seminal development and pioneers of the sport. A New York Times review of the latter book referred to Thorn as "a researcher of colossal diligence."

Thorn is also the co-author with Pete Palmer and Bob Carroll of The Hidden Game of Football and with them co-editors of Total Football. His book New York 400, a graphic history of the city timed for its quadricentennial, created with the Museum of the City of New York and Running Press, was published in September 2009. Thorn is a columnist for Voices, the publication of the New York Folklore Society.

He founded Total Sports Publishing and served as its publisher from 1998 to 2002.

== Role as historian ==
Thorn served as the senior creative consultant for the 1994 Ken Burns documentary Baseball.

In 2004, Thorn discovered documentation tracing the origins of baseball in America to 1791 in Pittsfield, Massachusetts. He has also attempted to shed light on the contributions of 19th century pioneers of the game, while debunking common misconceptions. "I don't want anyone to think of me as a crusader on behalf of causes," he wrote. "I'm only interested in setting the story straight, and in recognizing other stories for what they are, some of which are legend." Despite the claims of various localities to being the "birthplace of baseball," Thorn simply follows facts. "Abner Doubleday, Santa Claus, and Dracula," he notes, "are equally mythic figures."

In June 2006, the Society for American Baseball Research (SABR) bestowed on Thorn its highest accolade, the Bob Davids Award. The award honors those whose contributions to SABR and baseball reflect the ingenuity, integrity, and self-sacrifice of the late founder and past president of SABR, L. Robert "Bob" Davids.

On March 1, 2011, John Thorn was named Official Baseball Historian for Major League Baseball, succeeding the late Chicago Tribune and Chicago Sun-Times baseball writer Jerome Holtzman, who served in the role from 1999 until his death in 2008.

Thorn played an important role in the retroactive recategorization of the defunct Negro leagues, which existed during the segregation of baseball, as major leagues. On May 28, 2024, Major League Baseball said that statistics from the Negro Leagues will officially become part of the MLB's historical record.

== Personal life ==
Thorn has three sons from two previous marriages. He is currently married to Erica Freudenberger, former director of the Red Hook Public Library in Red Hook, New York, and who is currently affiliated with the Southern Adirondack Library System.

He and his wife live in Catskill, New York where they moved in 2010. He claims to have been drawn to the town because of its "slow pace," which suits him because, as Thorn asserts, "I pride myself on being the world's most boring man."

Thorn's great-grandfather was magician Ernest Thorn; the two share their middle name "Abraham".
