= Michael Gershman (publicist) =

- Born: October 11, 1939; Brooklyn, New York, US
- Died: January 4, 2000 (aged 60); Westport, Connecticut, US
- Occupations: Screenwriter; Publicist; Music Producer
- Spouses: Barbara Corday (m. 1966; div. 1969) Suzy Kalter (m. 1975)
- Children: 1

Michael Gershman (October 11, 1939 – January 4, 2000) was an American writer, publicist, and music producer.

== Biography ==
Gershman was born in Brooklyn, New York. After graduating from Brown University, Gershman worked briefly as a newspaper reporter before joining the Dorothy Ross Agency in New York City. There, he served as a press agent for comedians Woody Allen, Dick Cavett, and Joan Rivers.

In the late 1960s, he moved to California to focus on clients in the music business. Among his clients were the Doors, Jefferson Airplane, Neil Diamond, Elton John, and James Taylor. He left the business to manage and produce the band Looking Glass. Among the songs he worked on was the 1972 single Brandy (You're a Fine Girl), which reached number one on the Billboard Hot 100 chart.

Gershman would later return to work as a publicist, representing musicians like Mel Torme and Lionel Richie. He moved back to the east coast in the 1980s and became a prolific baseball writer authoring 16 books on the subject.

His 1993 book, Diamonds: The Evolution of the Ballpark, received the CASEY Award.

With John Thorn, he formed the book packaging company called Baseball Ink, and produced the reference work "Total Baseball", which would eventually become the official encyclopedia of Major League Baseball. Thorn and Gershman went on to found Total Sports Publishing.

== Personal life ==
In 1969, he divorced his first wife Barbara Corday; they had one daughter, Evan.

In 1975, he married his second wife, Suzy Kalter. His widow, who died on July 25, 2012, from brain cancer at age 64, was a journalist and the author of the Born to Shop book series.

Gershman died at his home in Westport, Connecticut, in 2000.

== External sources ==
- Obituary from the Hollywood Reporter
- Notice of death of Suzy Gershman
