= Total Baseball =

Total Baseball is a 2,301-page baseball encyclopedia first compiled by John Thorn and Pete Palmer in 1989. By its fourth edition, Major League Baseball endorsed it as its official encyclopedia. The encyclopedia contains seasonal and career statistics in numerous categories for every Major League Baseball player, as well as historical, opinion, and year-by-year essays. Thorn wrote one of the chapters and edited the rest while Palmer, in collaboration with Thorn, provided the statistics.

== History ==
The idea for Total Baseball originated when two baseball historians and statisticians, Thorn and Palmer, realized that the current Baseball Encyclopedia, at that time endorsed by Major League Baseball, contained numerous significant mistakes. These included thousands of miscalculations by earlier statisticians, typographical errors made by the original scorekeepers, and even "phantom" players who did not actually exist and were added to a box score incorrectly, Lou Proctor being a notable example. In addition, Thorn and Palmer corrected mistakes not commonly accepted by the baseball community, such as the discovery that Ty Cobb actually garnered 4,189 hits, not 4,191, or that Walter Johnson in fact had 417 career wins, not 414 or 416.

Thorn and Palmer also included six new sabermetric statistics for batters and fielders, and eight for pitchers. Some of these, such as runs created, were developed by statisticians like Bill James, but most were of Palmer's design. Most importantly, Thorn and Palmer normalized both conventional and new statistics for era and home park. Their most important new statistic was on-base plus slugging (OPS, today commonly seen on baseball cards and scoreboards) for all batters since 1876 for whom bases on balls were recorded. As OPS+ the statistic was normalized for season and home park, thus permitting direct comparison of the impact of players across generations, such as Babe Ruth in 1927 and Barry Bonds in 2001.

The first edition of the book included over 1,500 pages of statistics for all of the then 13,160 players in the history of the game. The Player Register section provided 27 batting, baserunning, and fielding statistics, broken out by year and team. The Pitcher Register included 28 pitching, batting, baserunning, and fielding statistics. The All-Time Leaders section included the top 100 all-time and single-season leaders in each of 95 categories.

The Roster section included the regular players, pitchers, key substitutes, and managers for all 2,010 team seasons in the history of professional baseball going back to 1871. These were grouped alphabetically by city and then by one of the six leagues: the National Association, Union Association, Players' League, Federal League, National League, and the American League. It also included a Manager Roster, a Coach Roster, and an Umpire Roster.

The Home-Road Statistics section illustrated the powerful effects ballparks can have on batting and pitching performance. It included the won-lost and run-scoring characteristics of every park in the three most significant major leagues – the American and National Leagues and the American Association. It also included the home/road records for all teams in all leagues since 1871. Collectively, they enabled the creation of a Park Factor, a measure of batting or pitching in one ballpark compared to the average of other parks.

Total Baseball also included 41 chapters in six sections about all aspects of the game.

- The History – The History of Major League Baseball, Team Histories, Postseason Play, The All-Star Game, The Changing Game, and A Baseball Calendar.
- The Players – The Lives of the Players, Demographics, Foreign-Born Players, Baseball Families, No Minor League Experience, Baseball Nicknames, Mascots and Superstitions, Phantom Ballplayers, Scandals and Controversies, Tragedies and Shortened Careers, Managers, Coaches, and Umpires.
- The Highlights of the Game – Streaks and Feats, Awards and Honors, and Baseball Lore.
- Other Leagues – Black Ball, Rival Leagues, The Minor Leagues, Japanese Baseball, Baseball in the Caribbean, College Baseball, Baseball in the Armed Services, and Women in Baseball.
- The Game Off the Field – The Business of Baseball, Baseball and the Law, Trades and Free Agency, Baseball Commissioners, The Farm System, The Fans, Concessions, Baseball on the Air, and Baseball Betting.
- Appendices – Rules and Scoring, The City Series, and The Ultimate Baseball Library.

Total Baseball was “packaged” by Baseball Ink, a company founded by Thorn and David Reuther. Baseball Ink provided the contents which were edited by Rick Horgan, Senior Editor at Warner Books. Baseball Ink then designed the book, had it copyedited and proofread, then delivered it to Warner ready for the printer.

The first edition of Total Baseball was published in 1989 by Warner Books and sold 75,000 copies. Warner published the Total Baseball 1990 Update in 1990. It also published Total Baseball, Second Edition in 1991. The latest edition, its eighth, was published in 2004.

== See also ==
- Total Sports Publishing
- Baseball statistics
