= Ernest Lanigan =

American baseball writer (1873-1962)

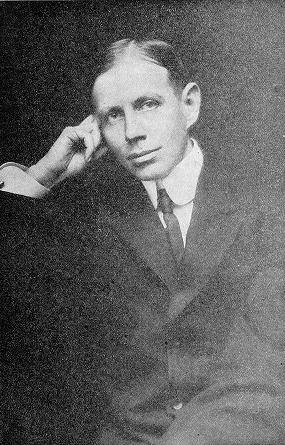
Ernest J. Lanigan

Ernest John Lanigan (January 4, 1873 in Chicago, Illinois – February 6, 1962 in Philadelphia, Pennsylvania) was an American sportswriter and historian on the subject of baseball. He was considered the premier baseball statistician and historian of his day. He was a pioneer at gathering information about baseball statistics and about the players themselves, and was the author of the first encyclopedia of the subject.

In addition to having parents who were both writers and editors (George Thomas Lanigan and Bertha Spink Lanigan ), Lanigan was the nephew, on his mother's side, of The Sporting News founders Al Spink and Charles Spink, and one of five men in his family, including J. G. Taylor Spink and C.C. Johnson Spink, to gain acclaim as a newspaperman.

== Career ==
Shortly after The Sporting News was launched in the mid-1880s, 15-year-old Lanigan went to work for his uncles. He spent three years at the paper before becoming a bank clerk for the next eight years. His knowledge of baseball and writing, along with his interest in statistics, developed during this period. However, he also came down with a lung infection, possibly pneumonia, which affected his health for the remainder of his long life.

During a two-year convalescence in the Adirondack Mountains, he continued gathering baseball statistics for The Sporting News, as he had during his banking career, and began developing new statistical measures. The best known of these were the RBIs and the CS, which he researched and catalogued, and which were eventually adopted as official major league statistics. He also developed more comprehensive compilations of winning and losing pitchers.

Over the course of his career he also worked for the New York Press as sports editor until 1911 and was the official scorer for some of the early World Series. He later served as sports editor for the Cleveland Leader.

He worked as secretary and information director of the International League around the time it was reorganized from the Eastern League. He also served as business manager of two St. Louis Cardinals farm teams.

Lanigan also wrote for Baseball Magazine, and it was under that banner that he compiled and published the first baseball encyclopedia, which he called The Baseball Cyclopedia, in 1922. The publisher advertised on the book's title page that it "comprises a review of Professional Baseball, the history of all Major League Clubs, playing records and unique events, the batting, pitching and base running champions, World's Series' statistics and a carefully arranged alphabetical list of the records of more than 3500 Major League ball players, a feature never before attempted in print." In addition to the original publication of 1922, 12 annual supplements were published. The supplement claimed to contain "a complete up-to-date supplement of recent records" and retailed for $1.00.

In 1946, Lanigan was named curator of the National Baseball Hall of Fame and Museum, and later served as its historian. He held that post until he retired in 1959, when he was replaced by Lee Allen, who continued Lanigan's work in compiling biographical stats on players.

Lanigan was called "Ernie" by his friends. He was also given the not-necessarily-flattering nickname of "Figure Filbert" (or "Figger Filbert") by Damon Runyon, as a more poetic way of saying "numbers nut".

Lanigan affirmed that characterization, as he once confided to fellow baseball writer Fred Lieb: "I really don't care much about baseball, or looking at ball games, major or minor. All my interest in baseball is in its statistics. I want to know something about every major league ball player, not only what he is hitting, but his full name with all middle names and initials, where they were born, and where they live now." Lieb, who was still among the living at Lanigan's centennial in 1973, called him "the patron saint of SABR".
