= Doubleday myth =

Debunked claim that US Army general Abner Doubleday invented baseball

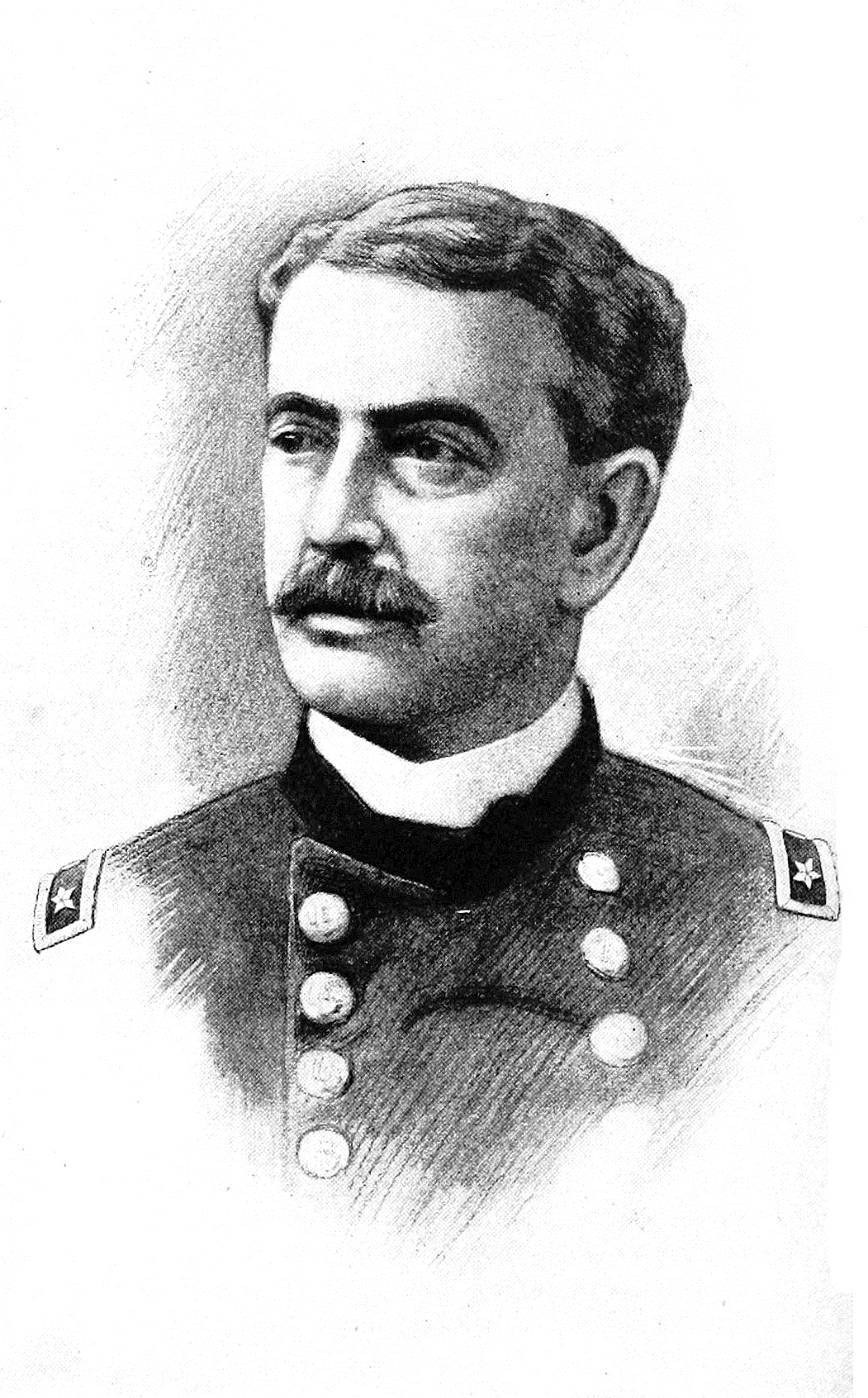
Abner Doubleday

The Doubleday myth is the claim that the sport of baseball was invented in 1839 by the future American Civil War general Abner Doubleday in Cooperstown, New York. In response to a dispute over whether baseball originated in the United States or was a variation of the British game rounders, the Mills Commission was formed in 1905 to seek out evidence. Mining engineer Abner Graves authored a letter claiming that Doubleday invented baseball. The letter was published in a newspaper and eventually used by the Mills Commission to support its finding that the game was of American origin. In 1908, it named Doubleday the creator of baseball.

The claim initially received a favorable reception from Americans, but eventually garnered criticism from various writers. Modern baseball historians consider the myth to be false. Graves' testimony has been critiqued in various regards, as the details of his story and his reliability as a witness have been questioned, and the Mills Commission made departures from his letter in its report. The National Baseball Hall of Fame and Museum was built in the town where Graves said the game was created, Cooperstown. The legend is well known among fans of the sport.

== Background ==
In the late 19th century and early 20th century, a dispute arose about the origins of baseball and whether it had been invented in the United States or developed as a variation of rounders, a game played in Great Britain and Ireland. The game had found increasing popularity in the U.S. after the rise of professional baseball during the 1860s and 1870s, and immigrants were composing a higher percentage of players, in particular those of Irish descent. The theory that the sport was created in the U.S. was backed by Chicago Cubs president Albert Spalding and National League (NL) president Abraham G. Mills. In 1889, Mills gave a speech during a banquet to honor the Chicago team and a group of NL all-stars, both of which had participated in a world tour to promote the game. During his remarks at Delmonico's restaurant in New York City, Mills declared that baseball was strictly American, which he said was determined through "patriotism and research"; many of his audience of about 300 responded by shouting "No rounders!"

The rounders theory was supported by prominent sportswriter Henry Chadwick, a native of Britain who noted common factors between rounders and baseball in a 1903 article. Like baseball, rounders features nine-player teams, fields with four bases, and clubs alternately batting during a selected number of innings. In contrast to baseball, in which bags are used for bases, rounders games utilize sticks; another key difference between the games is that foul balls do not occur in rounders. Chadwick said in his piece that "There is no doubt whatever as to base ball having originated from the two-centuries-old English game of rounders." Spalding disputed Chadwick's article in the next version of his Spalding Base Ball Guide.

In 1905, Spalding called for an investigation into how the sport was invented. Chadwick supported the idea, and later in the year a commission was formed. Spalding instructed the commission to decide between the American game of "Old Cat" and rounders as baseball's predecessor. Seven men served on the commission, including Mills. Spalding chose the committee's members, picking men who supported his theory and excluding supporters of the rounders claim, such as Chadwick. The committee sought information on the beginnings of the sport from members of the public, soliciting feedback in publications. It received numerous letters, primarily from former players. Many of the details they provided pertained to early variations of baseball, but evidence supporting Spalding's theory was lacking. On April 1, 1905, the Akron Beacon Journal newspaper published an article by Spalding that asked for details on the beginnings of the game to be sent to Amateur Athletic Union president James Sullivan, who was responsible for compiling information and presenting it to the commission. Spalding called the rounders theory "pap" and wrote that he would "refuse to swallow any more of it without some substantial proof sauce with it."

== Letter by Abner Graves ==
In response to Spalding's request for information on early baseball in the Beacon Journal, mining engineer Abner Graves of Denver, Colorado, wrote a letter to the editor stating that he had seen Abner Doubleday create a diagram of a baseball field. Doubleday (1819–1893) was a career United States Army officer who attained the rank of major general in the Union Army during the American Civil War.

According to Graves' letter, Doubleday set up the first baseball game in Cooperstown, New York, in approximately 1839. The letter, dated April 3, stated that Doubleday had invented baseball as a modified version of town ball, with four bases on the field and batters who attempted to hit tosses from a pitcher standing in a six-foot ring. According to Graves, the first game had matched players from "Otesego academy and Green's Select school". In his letter, Graves claimed that he and Doubleday were both students at Green's school. Graves' description of Doubleday's game indicated that each team had 11 players: the pitcher, a catcher, three infielders by the bases, two further infielders who covered the areas between the bases, and four outfielders. It listed the names of seven players from an early game that Graves claimed to have seen. The April 4 edition of the Beacon Journal included the first story that described Graves' Doubleday claims, with a headline that read, "Abner Doubleday Invented Base Ball".

The topic received coverage in the Sporting Life newspaper later in 1905. Spalding wrote a letter to Graves asking for evidence to back up his claim; Graves responded by sending a diagram matching the one he said Doubleday had drawn, along with a letter stating that the original had not been preserved and that most of the players at the time were no longer alive. This correspondence stated that the initial game took place between 1839 and 1841. Although Graves was unable to provide further evidence to back his claims, Spalding supported his version of events. The members of the Mills Commission received the available evidence in October 1907, and Mills wrote a report to Sullivan summarizing the findings on December 30. His report gave Doubleday credit for inventing the game of baseball and said that the sport was American in origin, listing 1839 as the year of its creation. Mills said that he understood why Doubleday would make changes to town ball, reducing the number of players in an effort to decrease the risk of injury. He noted that the number of players per team was higher than the nine in modern baseball, but explained this by indicating that he had taken part in games with 11 players per side. Additionally, Mills wrote that he thought Doubleday might have created the modern defensive putout system, which replaced the town ball method in which fielders could hit baserunners with thrown balls to record outs, even though Graves' testimony did not make this claim.

No one else on the committee sent any material to Sullivan after receiving the documentation; one member, Arthur Pue Gorman, had died. The surviving commission members were sent the letter by Mills, which was signed by each of them. Spalding later used the report's acceptance of the Doubleday myth to claim U.S. origins in his baseball history book, America's National Game. Graves' name did not appear in the book; Spalding said that the Doubleday content had come from "a circumstantial statement by a reputable gentleman", quoting Mills, and that he had "nothing to add to [the commission's] report." In his book, Spalding expressed delight that an American Army general had been found to be baseball's creator.

A reporter for The Denver Post interviewed Graves for a 1912 article, which contained a version of the Doubleday story that varied from what had been given to the Mills Commission in several respects. Graves placed the year of the first game as 1840, one year later than Mills had reported. In the interview, he said that he had played in the game, as a "Green College" student. No university of that name in Cooperstown is known to have been in existence. Graves was possibly referencing Major Duff's Classical and Military Academy, an elementary school whose pupils were nicknamed "Duff's Greens", which could have been the source for Graves' previous identification of "Green's Select" school. The college claim contradicted a previous letter in which he said he had been at Frog Hollow School, another elementary school, when baseball was created by Doubleday. The reporter did not question Graves' account, which included a statement that the 78-year-old was preparing to play in a local exhibition game. Graves again claimed to have taken part in the first game in a 1916 letter published in The Freeman's Journal.

== Creation of the Hall of Fame in Cooperstown ==
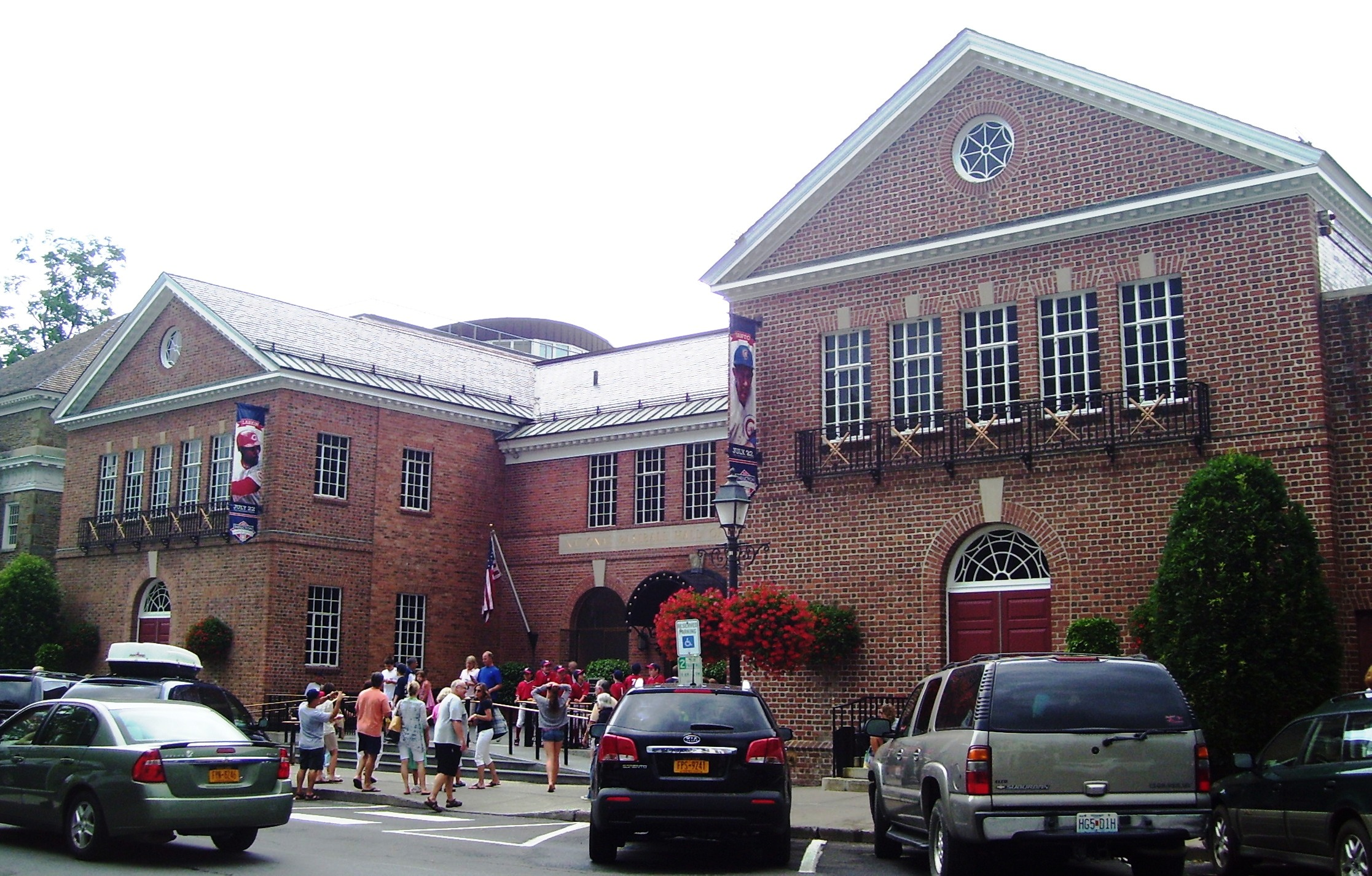
The National Baseball Hall of Fame is located in Cooperstown, the town where Doubleday was said to have invented baseball.

The National Baseball Hall of Fame and Museum was built in the village that served as the location of Doubleday's alleged first game, Cooperstown, New York. An article in the 1920 edition of the Spalding Baseball Guide supported the idea of a monument to Doubleday in Cooperstown. NL president John Heydler offered his backing for Cooperstown's efforts to purchase the grounds where Doubleday was said to have created baseball. In 1923, the village succeeded in buying the property. A baseball stadium—Doubleday Field—was erected there. Around 1934, a baseball said to be from Graves' family was found and purchased by Stephen Carlton Clark, a powerful figure in Cooperstown who created an exhibit in what became the National Baseball Museum around it. The concept of a baseball museum was supported by new NL president Ford Frick, who suggested that a Hall of Fame be created in connection with it. The Hall was subsequently built in Cooperstown. Clark's purchase came to be known as the "Doubleday ball", as the belief arose that it was used by him.

A committee from the New York State Legislature traveled to Cooperstown in 1937, and its subsequent report declared that the town was "the birthplace of baseball" and recommended a 100th anniversary celebration in 1939; events that were held included the dedication of the Hall and an all-star game. Prior to the ceremonies, the Doubleday claims were criticized by multiple parties: author Robert Henderson wrote that rounders and baseball were related, and Alexander Cartwright's son Bruce reported that his father had invented the sport. (Some sources have reported that fourteen years later, in 1953, the United States Congress formally recognized Cartwright as the inventor of modern baseball, but no documentation of such a declaration exists in the Congressional Record.) As part of Bruce Cartwright's efforts, the manager of Honolulu's Chamber of Commerce sent Hall promoter Alexander Cleland a letter that questioned Graves' account. In response, Cleland promised that a "Cartwright Day" would be included in the anniversary events at Cooperstown, which went ahead as scheduled.

Harold Seymour and Dorothy Seymour Mills wrote, "Some sports columnists pointed out the discrepancy; others got around it as gracefully as possible." The United States Postal Service marked the anniversary by releasing a commemorative stamp, which did not feature an image of Doubleday. The Hall's day honoring Cartwright was held in the summer of 1939. By this time, Cartwright was a member of the Hall; in 1938, the Centennial Committee had elected him. The honor came weeks after Clark had investigated Doubleday's role in baseball's origins in response to the Cartwright reports.

== Reception ==
=== Contemporary reactions ===
After the release of Mills' report, which was published in the 1908 version of Spalding's Guide, the belief that Doubleday had invented baseball "gained currency among the general public" in the U.S., according to author Brian Martin. Textbooks recorded the Civil War veteran's creation of the game, as many Americans accepted the idea that it had originated in their country. By 1909, critiques of the report began to appear in the media. In the May 1909 edition of the magazine Collier's, writer William Henry Irwin offered multiple criticisms. First, he expressed the belief that, prior to both Doubleday's purported invention and the existence of rounders, Britain had a sport with the baseball name. In addition, he noted that Doubleday was in West Point, New York, in 1839. That year, he was a United States Military Academy (USMA) plebe. It is unlikely that Doubleday traveled to Cooperstown in 1839, as first-year cadets such as Doubleday were rarely given leave at the time. Also in 1909, The Sporting News' founder, Alfred Henry Spink, received a letter from sportswriter William M. Rankin, which called the Doubleday claims false, citing United States Department of War and West Point records, and said that the New York Knickerbockers had invented baseball in 1845. The articles did little to change popular sentiment at the time.

More stories critical of the Doubleday claims were published in 1939, the 100th anniversary of the supposed invention in 1839. Sportswriter Frank Menke, who believed that baseball evolved from cricket, authored the book Encyclopedia of Sports, in which he published the report from the Mills Commission and critiqued it. Among other comments, he wrote that a reference had been made to a drawing by Doubleday, which had not been known to exist. Another point he raised regarded a link between Doubleday and Mills. Despite having been around Doubleday during the Civil War and later, Mills mentioned no personal involvement in baseball by Doubleday before Graves' testimony was released. Menke's views were given publicity by New York City newspaper reporter Bob Considine. Later in 1939, Henderson wrote that the sport had been detailed in documents dating back to the mid-1830s. A story in The New York Times called Henderson's work "a regular bomb on the big baseball program" that was scheduled for Cooperstown, but suggested that the 1839 origin story had "been accepted for centennial celebration by common agreement among peace loving citizens." Skepticism of the Doubleday myth took hold by the middle of the century, though. Clark himself eventually expressed doubt that a single person had created the sport.

=== Modern analysis ===
The Doubleday story has been discredited by modern baseball historians. The recollections of Graves have been criticized because Graves was five years old in 1839, and 71 when he first made the Doubleday claims, leading to the possibility of inaccurate memories. Author William Ryczek notes that Graves did not claim to have attended the first game in his initial letter, but stated that he learned of it having been in Cooperstown. Although Spalding referred to Doubleday and Graves as "playmates" in his submission of evidence to the Mills Commission, Doubleday was more than a decade older than Graves, turning 20 in 1839. Ryczek describes Graves as an unreliable witness. One of his other claims, which he made to reporters, was that he was a deliveryman for the Pony Express. Graves said that he had worked for the service in 1852, eight years before it was founded. Late in his life, he shot and killed his wife; he was found insane by a jury and committed to a psychiatric hospital. Graves also expressed anti-English sentiments in a letter to the Mills Commission, writing, "Just in my present mood I would rather have Uncle Sam declare war on England and clean her up rather than have one of her citizens beat us out of Base Ball."

Author Brian Martin adds that Graves' account was tweaked by the Mills report in multiple ways. Information on fielders throwing at runners was removed, which Martin considers an attempt to show similarity to the baseball being played at the time. In addition, 1839 was called the year of the game's creation by Mills when 1841 was also a possibility according to Graves, who had written that the invention occurred before or after the 1840 presidential campaign of William Henry Harrison, during the spring months.

Doubleday himself made only one mention of baseball in his letters or diaries before his 1893 death; the only time the sport appears in his papers dates from 1871, when he penned a request for equipment. One obituary of Doubleday noted that he had displayed no real interest in outdoor sports during his life. A theory expressed by historian David Block is that Graves had actually known one of Doubleday's cousins, Abner Demas or John—both Cooperstown residents—and eventually the more famous Abner was whom he remembered. While denying that the Doubleday family factored into baseball's creation, fellow historian Peter Morris noted that it is "conceivable that Graves's recollections had some slim basis in fact." Historian John Thorn said that Spalding had a connection to Doubleday: he financially supported the Theosophical Society, a group in which Doubleday served as a chapter vice president.

Author Robert Elias credits the Doubleday myth for contributing to the idea of American exceptionalism. Elias cites Doubleday's history with the U.S. military, as well as the sense that "having a homegrown sport was important for America's national identity." Historian David Block wrote that Americans had been eager to accept the Doubleday story when it came out, at a time when the U.S. was growing in influence. While calling the Doubleday legend "amusingly fraudulent", Alexander Cartwright biographer Harold Peterson said that it had "obstinate durability."

== Legacy ==
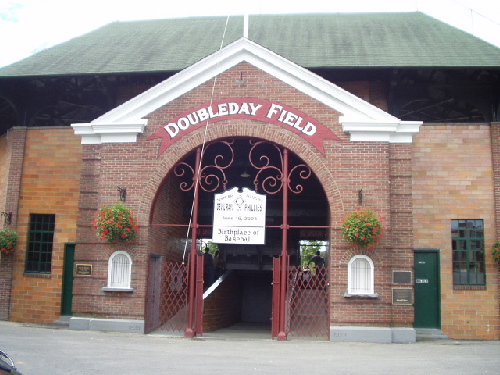
The main entrance to Doubleday Field, with a sign that reads "Birthplace of Baseball"

Long after the Doubleday myth was declared false by historians, it remains an object of fascination. Tim Arango of The New York Times wrote that the story "has taken a position in the pantheon of great American myths, alongside George Washington's cherry tree, Paul Bunyan and Johnny Appleseed." It was written about in numerous publications, and became well known among baseball fans. Thorn described Doubleday as "the man who did not invent baseball but instead was invented by it." The myth has received the backing of Major League Baseball commissioner Bud Selig, who said in 2010 that "I really believe that Abner Doubleday is the 'Father of Baseball.'" At one time, the state of New York made similar statements in promotions for Cooperstown.

While Chadwick biographer Andrew Schiff noted that "there is no clear inventor of the game", further research has been done on the origins of baseball. In 2004, a document was found that dated a sport called baseball to at least 1791, almost 50 years before Doubleday's supposed invention. It was an ordinance from Pittsfield, Massachusetts, which banned baseball from being played within 80 yards of a meeting house in the city; this implies that the game already existed at the time. The theory that activities such as rounders led to modern baseball remains common among modern historians, and older bat-and-ball games have been cited as well.

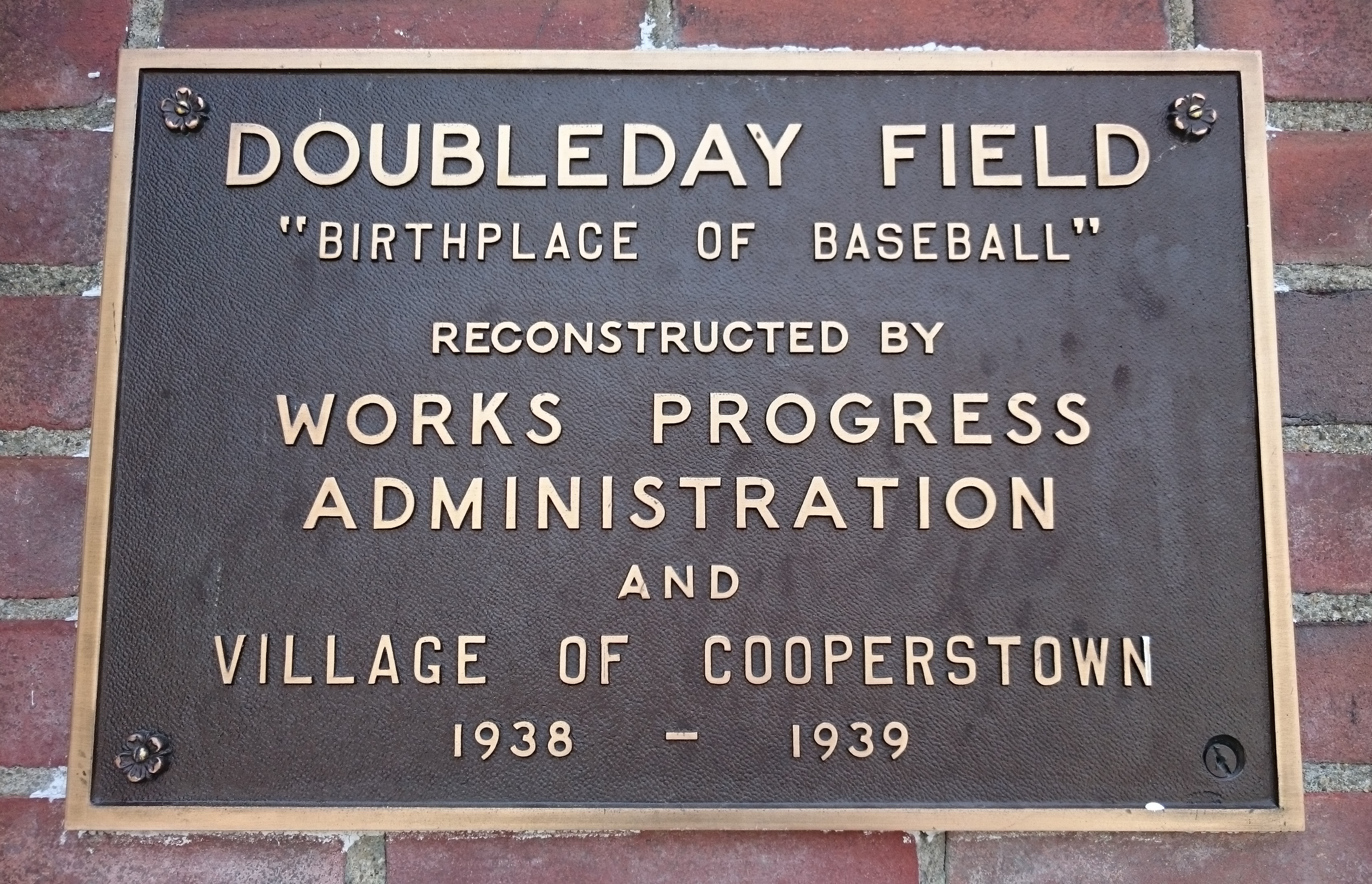
Plaque on main entrance

An extension of the legend developed later involving the growth of baseball in Mexico. Doubleday, who was in the country as part of the Mexican–American War, was alleged to have organized games for military camps, which drew interest from Mexican spectators.

In 1996, the Auburn Astros Minor League Baseball franchise changed its name to the Auburn Doubledays to honor the purported inventor of baseball. A motel in Cooperstown is also named after Doubleday, but unlike Cartwright, Doubleday was never inducted into the Hall. Nonetheless, the Hall supported the Doubleday myth for many years. More recently, the Hall has taken a small step away from the myth; when it announced special events in conjunction with its 75th year of operation in 2013–14, it made the following statement in its official press release:

On June 12, 1939, the National Baseball Museum opened its doors for the first time, in honor of the 100th anniversary of the mythical "first game" that allegedly was played in Cooperstown on June 12, 1839.

The Hall states that Cooperstown is "representative" of the location of baseball's birthplace, although Doubleday Field has a plaque and sign that repeat the myth's claims. In the Hall's museum, the Doubleday ball's modern display rejects the Doubleday myth, with writings that call it "a thriving legend that reflects Americans' desire to make the game our own."
