= Batting average =

Statistic used in cricket, baseball, and softball

Batting average is a statistic in cricket, baseball, and softball that measures the performance of batters.

== Cricket ==
In cricket, a player's batting average is the total number of runs they have scored divided by the number of times they have been out. Since the number of runs a player scores and how often they get out are primarily measures of their own playing ability, and largely independent of their teammates, batting average is a good metric for an individual player's skill as a batter.

Most players have career batting averages in the range of 20 to 40. Among players with a minimum of 20 innings played or completed, the highest Test batting average belongs to Australia's Sir Donald Bradman, with 99.94.

== Baseball ==
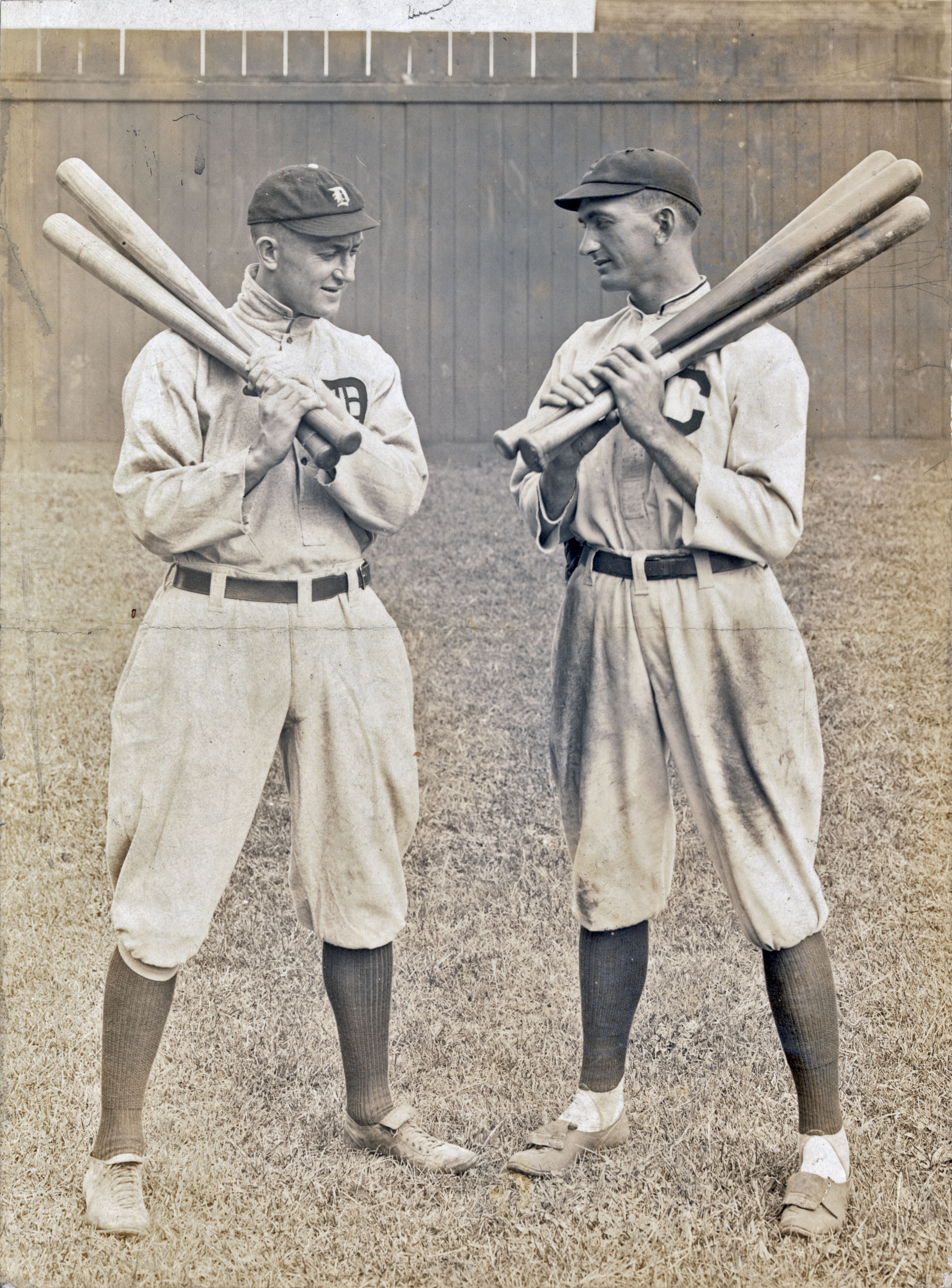
Ty Cobb (left) and Shoeless Joe Jackson (right) are first and third, respectively, in MLB career batting average.

In baseball, the batting average (BA) is defined by the number of hits divided by at bats. It is usually reported to three decimal places and read without the decimal: A player with a batting average of .300 is "batting three-hundred".

In modern times, a season batting average higher than .300 is considered to be excellent, and an average higher than .400 a nearly unachievable goal. The last Major League Baseball (MLB) player to do so, with enough plate appearances to qualify for the batting championship, was Ted Williams of the Boston Red Sox, who hit .406 in 1941. Ty Cobb holds the record for highest career batting average, with .366, eight points higher than Rogers Hornsby, who has the second-highest career average, at .358.

Sabermetrics, the study of baseball statistics, considers batting average a weak measure of performance because it does not correlate as well as other measures to runs scored, thereby causing it to have little predictive value.

== History ==
Henry Chadwick, an English statistician raised on cricket, was an influential figure in the early history of baseball. In the late 19th century he adapted the concept behind the cricket batting average to devise a similar statistic for baseball. Rather than simply copy cricket's formulation of runs scored divided by outs, he realized that hits divided by at bats would provide a better measure of individual batting ability. This is because while in cricket, scoring runs is almost entirely dependent on one's own batting skill, in baseball it is largely dependent on having other good hitters on one's team. Chadwick noted that hits are independent of teammates' skills, so used this as the basis for the baseball batting average. His reason for using at bats rather than outs is less obvious, but it leads to the intuitive idea of the batting average being a percentage reflecting how often a batter gets on base, whereas in contrary, hits divided by outs is not as simple to interpret in real terms.

== Other contexts ==
Following from usage in cricket and baseball, batting average has come to be used for other statistical measures of performance and in the general usage on how a person did in a wide variety of actions.

An example is the Internet Archive, which uses the term in ranking downloads. Its "batting average" indicates the correlation between views of a description page of a downloadable item, and the number of actual downloads of the item. This avoids the effect of popular downloads by volume swamping potentially more focused and useful downloads, producing an arguably more useful ranking.
