= Joe Simenic =

American baseball researcher and writer (1923–2015)

Joe Simenic (August 4, 1923 – February 7, 2015) was a baseball researcher, writer and a co-founder of the Society for American Baseball Research. He was considered "one of the true giants of baseball research."

== Endeavors ==
Simenic worked for The Cleveland News and the Plain Dealer where he was assistant to publisher Thomas Vail. While with the News, he performed research for sports editor Ed Bang. While at the Dealer, he was a researcher for sports editor Hal Lebovitz. He corrected mistakes in the Baseball Register and helped identify hundreds of unknown baseball players.

In 1986, he won the Bob Davids Award, SABR's top honor. In 1997, his book The Cleveland Indians Encyclopedia, co-authored with sportswriter Russ Schneider, was published. His work was used and cited in dozens of books.

== Personal life ==
He served in the Army Air Corps during World War II.

He was born in Kostanjevac, (Note: There are at least two villages named Kostanjevac in Croatia, and the available sources do not specify which one is meant.) Croatia and died at age 91 in Westerville, Ohio.
