= Bob Davids =

American baseball researcher and writer

- Born: Leonard Davids; March 19, 1926; Kanawha, Iowa, U.S.
- Died: February 10, 2002 (aged 75); Washington, D.C., U.S.
- Resting place: Arlington National Cemetery
- Other name: L. Robert Davids
- Education: University of Missouri, Georgetown University
- Occupations: Public relations, sportswriter
- Known for: Founder of SABR
- Spouse: Yvonne Revier
- Children: 1
- Awards: Henry Chadwick Award (2010)

Leonard Davids (March 19, 1926 – February 10, 2002), known as Bob Davids or L. Robert Davids, was an American baseball researcher and writer and the founder of the Society for American Baseball Research (SABR).

== Biography ==
Born in Kanawha, Iowa, Davids moved to San Diego during World War II where he worked in an aircraft factory. He later enlisted in the Army Air Corps and served two years, including a tour as a B-24 nose gunner in the Pacific. After leaving the military, he attended the University of Missouri where he earned a bachelor's degree in journalism and a master's degree in history. He subsequently earned a doctorate from Georgetown University in international relations.

In 1951, Davids began a 30-year career in federal service, mainly working the field of public information for agencies including the Departments of Defense and Energy, the Atomic Energy Commission, and for several members of Congress. During that period, he also contributed numerous articles on Congressional history to Roll Call, a newspaper covering Capitol Hill.

Davids wrote numerous freelance articles on baseball for The Sporting News (TSN) between 1951 and 1965. When TSN cut its baseball coverage, Davids began his own short-lived baseball publication, Baseball Briefs. He contributed baseball fact boxes to several newspapers, including The Washington Post and Chicago Sun-Times.

In 1971, Davids identified approximately 35 others with similar interests in baseball statistics and history—he called them "stathistorians"—and invited them to meet in Cooperstown, New York, at the National Baseball Hall of Fame and Museum. Sixteen attended the meeting, and agreed to the formation of the Society for American Baseball Research (SABR). Davids was elected the group's first president, an office he held on two other occasions. He also served two five-year terms on SABR's board of directors, and was actively involved in producing many of the organization's early publications. Davids was also active in SABR's first regional chapter, based in the Baltimore–Washington area.

In 1985, SABR created the Bob Davids Award, which is given annually to a member reflecting "the ingenuity, integrity, and self-sacrifice of" its namesake, and is considered SABR's highest honor. Since 1992, the organization's Washington chapter has been named in his honor. Davids himself was honored posthumously in 2010 with SABR's Henry Chadwick Award for baseball research.

Davids was married to the former Yvonne Revier, and had one daughter. He died in 2002 as the result of cancer at age 75 in Washington, D.C., and was interred in Arlington National Cemetery.

== Bob Davids Award winners ==
- 2025: Tom Hufford
- 2024: D. Bruce Brown
- 2023: Neal Traven
- 2022: F.X. Flinn
- 2021: Vince Gennaro
- 2020: Peter Mancuso
- 2019: Bill Lamb
- 2018: Larry McCray
- 2017: Larry Lester
- 2016: Stew Thornley
- 2015: Dan Levitt
- 2014: Leslie Heaphy
- 2013: Dick Beverage
- 2012: Jan Finkel
- 2011: Bill Nowlin
- 2010: Mark Rucker
- 2009: Tom Ruane
- 2008: Mark Armour
- 2007: Andy McCue
- 2006: John Thorn
- 2005: David W. Smith
- 2004: Dick Thompson
- 2003: Frederick Ivor-Campbell
- 2002: Evelyn Begley
- 2001: Larry Gerlach
- 2000: Lyle Spatz
- 1999: David W. Vincent
- 1998: John Pardon
- 1997: Len Levin
- 1996: Jack Kavanagh
- 1995: Cliff Kachline
- 1994: A.D. Suehsdorf
- 1993: Bill Carle
- 1992: Robert L. Tiemann
- 1991: Frank Phelps
- 1990: John Holway
- 1989: Pete Palmer
- 1988: E. Vern Luse
- 1987: Robert Hoie
- 1986: Joe Simenic
- 1985: Bob McConnell
