= Ray Nemec =

American baseball historian and researcher

Raymond J. Nemec (June 19, 1929 - April 17, 2015) was a prominent American baseball historian and researcher. He was a founding member of the Society for American Baseball Research.

He won the 2012 Henry Chadwick Award. A statistical researcher, he was "a pioneer in compiling and correcting the lifetime records of professional players at all levels." He was considered "the foremost authority on minor league players," having compiled statistics of over 100,000 players.
