= David Vincent =

David Vincent may refer to:

- David Vincent (musician) (born 1965), American musician
- David Vincent (voice actor) (born 1972), American voice actor
- David Vincent (academic), pro-vice-chancellor of The Open University
- David W. Vincent (1949–2017), American baseball scorer

== See also ==
- David Vicente (born 1999), Spanish footballer
