= George T. Lanigan =

Canadian journalist and poet

George Thomas Lanigan (10 December 1845 or 10 December 1846 - 5 February 1886) (variously Lannigan) was a Canadian journalist and poet.

== Biography ==
George Lanigan was born in 1845 or 1846 in Saint-Charles-sur-Richelieu, Quebec. He studied in Montreal and worked as a telegrapher before he became a writer and journalist. In 1867, Lanigan founded the Free Lance, a weekly satirical magazine. At the same time, Lanigan worked at the Montreal Gazette as a sports editor, where he met Hugh Graham, 1st Baron Atholstan. Lord Atholstan became a business partner for the Free Lance from late 1868 on, until it ceased publication in March 1869. On 16 January 1869, they, perhaps together with journalist Thomas Marshall, created the Evening Star, which changed its name to the Star in 1877 and The Montreal Star in 1881. It was a one-cent daily specializing in sensational news and scandals, and did not win favour with the educated public of Montreal.

Lanigan sold his share in the Star and moved to the United States, first working for the New York World and then moving on to Philadelphia where he worked for The Philadelphia Record.

Lanigan married Bertha Spink, editor of the Ladies Home Journal, and the sister of Alfred Henry Spink. They had four children, including baseball statistician Ernest Lanigan, and newspaper sports editor and baseball writer Harold Lanigan. He died in Pennsylvania in 1886.

Lanigan's granddaughter was Philadelphia composer Frances McCollin.

== Works ==
- 1864: Canadian Ballads (translations of French-Canadian ballads)
- 1878: Fables out of the World (under the pen name George Washington Aesop)

== Poetry ==
In A Threnody Lanigan laments the death of the Akond of Swat.

The poem begins:

What, what, what,
What’s the news from Swat?
Sad news,
Bad news,
Comes by the cable led
Through the Indian Ocean’s bed,
Through the Persian Gulf, the Red
Sea and the Med-
Iterranean—he’s dead;
The Ahkoond is dead!

Just as Edward Lear remarked - "Who or why or which or what//is the Akond of Swat", so Lanigan plays with the title more than the event.

Similarly in his Dirge of the Moolla of Kotal: Rival of the Akhoond of Swat beginning:

Alas, unhappy land: ill-fated spot
Kotal--though where or what
On earth Kotal is, the bard forgot;
Further than this indeed he knoweth not--
It borders upon Swat!
