= Baseball (book series) =

Three-volume book series on the history of baseball

- 2011 edition covers
- The Early Years (1960); The Golden Age (1971); The People's Game (1989)
- Author: Harold Seymour; Dorothy Seymour Mills
- Country: United States
- Language: English
- Genre: Baseball; History
- Publisher: Oxford University Press
- Published: 1960–1989
- Media type: Print (hardcover and paperback)
- No. of books: 3

Baseball is a three-volume book series about the history of baseball by historians Harold Seymour and Dorothy Seymour Mills. The series, praised for its research and fact-finding, is widely considered to be the first scholarly examination of the game's history.

== Background ==
The book series' origins came from Harold Seymour's 1956 Ph.D. dissertation which was entitled The Rise of Major League Baseball to 1891. Oxford University Press approached him to expand the dissertation into a book which became the first of three volumns.

Working alongside Seymour was his wife Dorothy. Seymour found that his wife's work was indispensable to him. She did majority of the research, organized material, and structured the notes for the first and second volumes of the work. Dorothy wrote most of the third volume herself as Harold's health had deteriorated significantly and he was suffering from Alzheimer's disease. However, during Harold's lifetime, Dorothy did not get any credit for her contributions.

In 2011, Oxford University Press co-credited Seymour Mills as the co-author of the trilogy, alongside her husband, finally acknowledging her contributions to baseball, with her name coming first on the third book which she almost entirely written herself.

== Volumes ==
=== The Early Years ===
The first volume was the extension of Harold Seymour's dissertation, documenting the origins and early years of baseball and tracing its rise from its amateur era and to the beginnings of Major League Baseball (MLB). The book notably successfully debunked the myth that Civil War General Abner Doubleday invented baseball.

=== The Golden Age ===
The second volumn continues from the game's development in the early 20th century, during what is often called the "Golden age of baseball", when baseball became the "National Pastime" for Americans. It also covers the onset of the live ball era, after the notorious Black Sox scandal threatened to tarnish the game, and how the business model evolved as a result.

=== The People's Game ===
The third and final volume, unlike the first two, is devoted to baseball outside organized baseball and MLB. It covers amateur and semi-professional baseball and players, college baseball, baseball in the military, Negro league teams, and women's teams.

== See also ==
- Seymour Medal
- History of baseball in the United States
