= Lee Allen (baseball) =

American sportswriter

Leland Gaither Allen (January 12, 1915 – May 20, 1969) was an American sportswriter and historian on the subject of baseball. He was known for an accessible writing style that made history more interesting, typically focusing on the people in the stories as much as the events.

== Early life ==
A native of Cincinnati, Ohio, Allen was the son of U.S. Representative Alfred Gaither Allen. After attending Kenyon College as a psychology major, spending a semester at the Columbia University School of Journalism, and working for the Cincinnati Reds as a publicity director and traveling secretary, he began his writing career with the Cincinnati Enquirer, and wrote the Cincinnati entry in the Putnam Publishing series on the Major League Baseball teams.

== Career ==
He authored other books, including histories of the National League and American League, the World Series, and a volume about the Giants-Dodgers rivalry. He was also a frequent contributor to The Sporting News, including articles to their annual publications as well as a weekly column called "Cooperstown Corner". In the early 1940s Allen assisted Waite Hoyt on Cincinnati Reds radio broadcasts.

From 1959 until his death, he was the curator at the Baseball Hall of Fame, succeeding Ernest Lanigan. In that capacity, and with his substantial collection of biographical information on ballplayers (continuing Lanigan's work), he had a great deal of input to the first edition of the famous MacMillan Baseball Encyclopedia which was published in the same year he died.

Although Allen had been inspired as a youth by his Hall of Fame predecessor's Baseball Cyclopedia, he was not the "figger filbert" that Lanigan was. However, they did share a common interest in the personal stories of the ballplayers. This quote from Allen's SABR profile highlights their differences and similarities. The first sentence is polar opposite to Lanigan's philosophy, the remainder is right in line with Lanigan's work: "I care very little for statistics as such. My concern is the players. Who are these men? What are they? What problems have they faced? Where are they now?"

In addition to biographies, Allen was also a pioneer in gathering information about baseball parks, and published one of the first comprehensive lists of major league ballparks and their locations, in the 1961 edition of one of The Sporting News publications.

The Cincinnati chapter of the Society of American Baseball Research is named in honor of Allen.

He died of a heart attack in Syracuse, New York while on a road trip researching a subject for a book.

In 2010, Allen was one of a select few baseball historians and writers who was awarded the first Henry Chadwick Award by the Society for American Baseball Research. The award honors baseball's prolific researchers who made an impact on baseball and its history.

== Lee Allen History of Baseball Award winners ==
2025

- “A Game Changer: Maria Pepe and the Revolution of Girls in Baseball,” by Kristyn Castaneda, of Paterson, New Jersey

2024

- “Design Fun-Dations: The Rebranding Revolution That Revitalized Minor League Baseball,” by Jack McGuinn and Quinn Roberts of Baltimore, Maryland

2023

- “Much More than a Box Score: Larry Doby’s Integration of the American League and the Destruction of Black Baseball,” by Amy Snively of Cary, North Carolina

2022

- “Stranded at First Base: Sixty Years of Hardball Debate and Baseball Diplomacy and Their Impact on the Game in Cuba and the United States,” by Dominick Pizzelanti and Lilia Pizzelanti of Kutztown, Pennsylvania
- “Baltimore’s Ballpark Debates and Their Legacy: The Orioles’ Relocation from Memorial Stadium to Camden Yards,” by Marshall Civin of Baltimore, Maryland

2021

- “Writing Race: Sam Lacy Chronicles the Crossing of the Color Line in Sports Journalism,” by Dominick Pizzelanti and Grayson Ebner of Kutztown, Pennsylvania

2020

- “A Forgotten Hero: Larry Doby’s Fight to Integrate American League Baseball,” by Gianna Santangelo, Rebecca Catlos, and Tory Bobosky of New Middletown, Ohio

2019

- “Jackie Robinson: Stealing Bases and Gaining Equality Among the Races,” by Frederic Ward and William Ward of Norfolk, Virginia

2018

- “To Enrich the Future, Not to Avenge the Past: How Jackie Robinson’s Compromise With Branch Rickey in Major League Baseball Led to Robinson Joining the Conflict of the Civil Rights Movement,” by Connor Albert of North Yarmouth, Maine

2017

- “Branch Rickey’s Stand: The Integration of Baseball,” by Evan Nelson of Clovis, California

2016

- “The Path to the Sugar Mill or the Path to Millions: The MLB Baseball Academy’s Effect on the Dominican Republic,” by Thomas McKenna of Lovettsville, Virginia

2015

- “Restoring Public Faith in the National Pastime: Baseball’s First Commissioner,” by Ji-Ho Lee of Columbia, Missouri

2014

- “The Curt Flood Case: Free Agency for Athletes,” by Harrison O’Brien of South Hamilton, Massachusetts

2013

- “The All-American Girls Professional Baseball League,” by Grace Olson of La Crosse, Wisconsin

2012

- “The Baseball Diamond: The Only Jewel Wrapped in Chains,” by Jacob Hurwitz of Portage, Michigan, and Andrew Beck and Eli Cartier of Kalamazoo, Michigan

2011

- “Play Ball! Jackie Robinson: Breaking the Color Barrier,” by Russell Aspinwall and Garrett Fragala of South Haven, Michigan

2010

- “Branch Rickey’s Surreptitious Civil Rights Strategy,” by Cody Driver and Andrew Kanei of Mililani, Hawaii

2009

- “Jackie Robinson,” by Marissa Haarmann of Phoenix, Arizona

2008

- “Jackie Robinson Keeps His Cool,” by Zach Frampton of Laie, Hawai

2007

- “Play Ball! A Triumph For Women Begins Amidst the Tragedy of World War II,” by Alana Klco of Whitehall, Michigan

2006

- “End The Unjust Monopoly: Curt Flood’s Stand Against Baseball’s Reserve Clause,” by Colin Bender of Edmond, Oklahoma

2005

- “Jackie Robinson and Larry Doby Break the Color Barrier,” by Fleetwood Fleming of Mount Pleasant, South Carolina.

2004

- “Girls of Summer: Paving the Way for Women in All Seasons,” by Corissa Westergard, Shelby Johnson and Mackenzie Heyl of Davenport, Iowa

2003

- “Jackie Robinson: The Man Responsible for the Integration of Baseball,” by Alexander Hearn of Indianapolis, Indiana

2002

- “Free Agency Revolutionizes the Business of Baseball,” by Steve Mason and Kevin Rowe of Grand Rapids, Michigan

2001

- “Exhibit of Jackie Robinson Integrates Baseball,” by Philip Beck of Rothschild, Wisconsin

2000

- “Turning Points in Baseball History: Branch Rickey Hires Jackie Robinson,” by James McMahon of Windsor, Connecticut

1999

- No award given

1998

- “Baseball’s Migration to Latin America,” by Nicholas Condon of Stamford, Connecticut

1997

- “Baseball’s Hidden Half,” by Carl Leivers and Marcus Kret of Colorado Springs, Colorado

1996

- “Curt Flood: Man Against the System,” by Alex Giannini, Ethan Schwart, Lane DeSimone and Brian Krost from Stanford, Connecticut
