= Eugene Murdock =

American historian

- Born: Eugene Converse Murdock; April 30, 1921; Lakewood, Ohio
- Died: July 23, 1992 (aged 71)
- Occupations: Historian, Author
- Spouse: Margaret "Rita" McColl
- Children: Kathryn Murdock, Gordon Murdock
- Parents: Stanley H. Murdock; Elizabeth Carter

Eugene Converse Murdock (April 30, 1921 – July 23, 1992) was a historian and author best known for his research into baseball.

== Early life and education ==
Eugene C. Murdock was born in Lakewood, Ohio, on April 30, 1921, and attended school there. His father, Stanely H. Murdock, worked for the city of Cleveland, Ohio, in the division of engineering and construction. Stanley and his wife Elizabeth had three sons, Donald L., Stanley H. Jr., Eugene C., and one daughter, Marjorie C.

Murdock saw his first major league baseball game on August 10, 1929, at League Park in Cleveland, Ohio where the New York Yankees played the Indians. As he grew older, Murdock would serve as sports editor of his high school newspaper. Baseball and writing would be lifelong passions of Murdock's, and he would go on to become a major researcher into the history of the sport.

Murdock was a student at Wooster College in September 1939, completed his bachelor's degree by December 1942, and then joined the Army. After serving in the Army, Murdock entered Columbia University in 1946. Working with Allan Nevins at Columbia, Murdock learned to appreciate the significance of oral history research. Murdock graduated with his MA in 1948 and Ph.D. in 1951.

== Career ==
Murdock's first teaching assignment was at Rio Grande College in southern Ohio beginning in 1952. Murdock then moved to Marietta College in 1956 where he was an assistant professor in history, being promoted to full professor in 1963. Murdock became chair of the department in 1972, holding that position until his retirement in 1986. After his retirement, Murdock was named Historian of the college.

In 1991, Murdock received the Distinguished Service Award from the Ohio Academy of History.

== Society for American Baseball Research ==
Since 1973, Murdock was a frequent contributor to the SABR Baseball Research Journal. His first article looked at players in the 19th century, The Pre-1900 Batting Stars.

Murdock served as president of SABR from 1976 to 1978, but served in various positions both before and after. Prior to serving as president, Murdock was chair of the SABR Hall of Fame Committee. He also was head of the SABR Nominating Committee (1981–1982) when he proposed two-year terms for the operating officers. This proposal would later be adopted by SABR.

== Baseball oral history research ==
Traveling across the United States between 1973 and 1987, Murdock interviewed 76 former baseball players. His time with Prof. Nevins at Columbia impressed on Murdock the importance of interviewing older persons as well as those not as well known as some. The interviews range from 30 minutes to multiple hours, and the audio is now available on Cleveland Public Library's Digital Gallery. The interviews are also featured in Murdock's book Baseball Players and Their Times, Oral Histories of the Game: 1920-40.

The oral history collection is part of Murdock's voluminous baseball research papers. Initially offered to Marietta College but declined, the collection was "promptly and eagerly" accepted by Cleveland Public Library in 1992. In addition to the oral histories, the overall collection also includes "major league biographies, annuals, and scrapbooks, covering the years 1910-1976."

== Other research ==
Murdock also wrote two books on the draft during the American Civil War: Patriotism Limited: 1862-1865 (1967) and One Million Men: The Civil War Draft in the North (1971)

Murdock's research interests also included World War II.
