= The Baseball Cyclopedia =

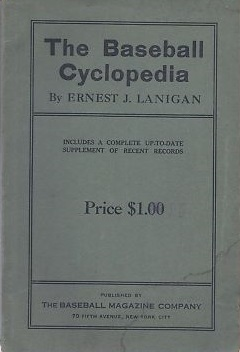
- Author: Ernest J. Lanigan
- Subject: Major League Baseball
- Genre: Reference
- Publication date: 1922

The Baseball Cyclopedia was the first encyclopedia covering major league baseball. It was compiled and published by sportswriter Ernest J. Lanigan, who served as the editor of the sports section of the New York Press. The nephew of Sporting News publisher Al Spink, Lanigan was known for being a baseball statistician, having served as an official scorer for multiple World Series.

== Recognition ==
Published by The Baseball Magazine Co. of New York City, which also published Lanigan's Baseball Magazine, the title page of the Baseball Cyclopedia advertised it as the first compendium of baseball statistics and history ever published:

Comprises a review of Professional Baseball, the history of all Major League Clubs, playing records and unique events, the batting, pitching and base running champions, World’s Series’ statistics and a carefully arranged alphabetical list of the records of more than 3500 Major League ball players, a feature never before attempted in print.

In addition to the original publication of 1922, 12 annual supplements were published. The supplement claimed to contain "a complete up-to-date supplement of recent records" and retailed for $1.00.
