= Fred Lieb =

American sportswriter

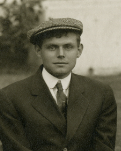
- Lieb in 1911
- Born: March 5, 1888; Philadelphia, Pennsylvania, U.S.
- Died: June 3, 1980 (aged 92); Houston, Texas, U.S.
- Occupation: Sportswriter
- Known for: Baseball reporting and history
- Awards: J. G. Taylor Spink Award (1972)

Frederick George Lieb (March 5, 1888 – June 3, 1980) was an American sportswriter and baseball historian. Lieb published his memoirs in 1977, which documented his nearly 70 years as a baseball reporter. He received the J. G. Taylor Spink Award from the Baseball Writers' Association of America in 1972. Born in 1888 in Philadelphia, Lieb died at age 92 in Houston.

== Career ==
Lieb was born on March 5, 1888, in Philadelphia, Pennsylvania; his favorite team growing up as a child was the Philadelphia Athletics. His sportswriting career began in 1909, when while working as a clerk for the Norfolk & Western Railroad he began submitting biographies of players to Baseball magazine. That led to a job with the Philadelphia news bureau; in 1911 he moved to New York where he joined the new Base Ball Writers Association. For the next 20 years, Lieb wrote for the New York Sun, Philadelphia Evening Telegraph, New York Evening Telegram and New York Post, surrounded by sportswriting legends such as Damon Runyon, Heywood Broun, and Grantland Rice.

Lieb is credited with coining the term "The House that Ruth Built," referring to the New York Yankees' brand new stadium that was christened by a Babe Ruth home run on their opening day, April 18, 1923. He and his wife Mary were especially close to Ruth's teammate Lou Gehrig; Walter Brennan's character in the movie The Pride of the Yankees was loosely based on him. In October 1931, Fred Lieb took a team, headlined by Gehrig, Lefty Grove, Mickey Cochrane, Al Simmons, and Lefty O'Doul, to Hawaii and Japan for a profitable exhibition tour. This and many other profitable investments along the way allowed Lieb to retire in 1934 from the "real work" of daily reporting to focus solely on writing about baseball. In 1935, Taylor Spink convinced Lieb to write a regular weekly column and select obituaries for The Sporting News; Lieb did this at his leisure from his home in St. Petersburg, Florida, for 35 years. At the peak of their circulation, his syndicated columns reached more than 100 newspapers.

Lieb's career would last a little over 70 years, as he continued to contribute to The Sporting News and St. Petersburg Times until his death on June 3, 1980. Lieb remained a member of the Baseball Writers' Association of America (BBWAA) for 68 years, serving as president from 1921 to 1924. in 1972, he received the J. G. Taylor Spink Award (named after his original boss at The Sporting News), and was added to the writers' wing of the National Baseball Hall of Fame in 1973. In what turned to be an early cross-generational tribute, Lieb received the first SABR salute from the Society for American Baseball Research in 1976. Over his career, Fred Lieb covered every World Series game from 1911 to 1958, 30 All-Star games, and over 8,000 major-league baseball games.

== Major works ==
Lieb was a prolific writer, contributing to The Sporting News from 1935 to 1980, the St. Petersburg Times from 1965 until his death, The Saturday Evening Post from 1927 to 1933, as well as freelancing for other numerous publications, scoring games in New York, and authoring several books. His 11 books include his memoirs—Baseball As I Have Known It—along with Connie Mack, Grand Old Man of Baseball; The Story of the World Series; The Baseball Story; and team histories of the Detroit Tigers, Boston Red Sox, St. Louis Cardinals, Pittsburgh Pirates, Baltimore Orioles, and Philadelphia Phillies.

== Notable events ==
Lieb initiated a rule change on February 9, 1920, when he suggested that a game-winning home run with men on base always be counted as a home run, even if its run was not needed to win the game. Previously, the batter would only be credited with a hit sufficient to score the winning run, and not any additional runs.

On May 15, 1922, Ty Cobb beat out a grounder to shortstop Everett Scott, and Lieb scored it a hit in the box score he filed with the Associated Press (AP). This contradicted official scorer John Kieran of the New-York Tribune, who ruled the play an error. At the end of the season, American League (AL) official records were compiled using the AP box scores, giving Cobb a .401 batting average. Lieb reversed his call, but AL president Ban Johnson went with the hit call. The New York writers protested to the commissioner on December 14, 1922, claiming that Ty Cobb's batting average should be .399 based on the official scorer's stats, but to no avail.

On September 11, 1923, as the official scorer for a Yankees–Red Sox game, Lieb ruled that a ball hit hard past Red Sox third baseman Howard Shanks was a hit. This was much to the chagrin for the Red Sox pitcher Howard Ehmke, who proceeded to retire the next 27 batters he faced, for a 3–0 shutout. Ehmke had thrown a no-hitter in the previous game that he had pitched, on September 7.
