= David Nemec =

American baseball historian and novelist

- Born: December 10, 1938 (age 87); Cleveland, Ohio, USA

David Nemec (born December 10, 1938) is an American baseball historian and novelist.

== Early life and education ==
Nemec was born in Cleveland, Ohio and spent most of his adolescence in Bay Village, Ohio. During his senior year at Bay High School, he was named the first winner of the Ed Bang Scholarship, created to honor the "Dean of American Sports Writers." Nemec played outfield and first base for Ohio State University while earning his BA in English. He graduated in 1960.

== Career ==
After serving in the army, Nemec taught and coached in Cleveland public schools while working on a novel about the Sam Sheppard murder case, which occurred in his hometown of Bay Village. Sheppard had been Nemec's family physician prior to Sheppard's 1954 conviction for his wife's murder. Nemec and his first wife, visual artist Vernita N'Cognita, moved to New York City in 1965. He won a Transatlantic Review award in 1967 for his first published story, On the Produce Dock.

During the 1970s, he worked as a parole officer in the Youthful Offender Bureau for the New York State Division of Parole while continuing to publish stories, including The Best American Short Stories. This experience later provided the backdrop for his second novel, Mad Blood, which was loosely based on the Career Girls Murders. In 1973, Nemec was awarded his first residency at Yaddo. Following his second stay in 1975, he drew on his vast baseball history to create The Absolutely Most Challenging Baseball Quiz Book, Ever, which was published in 1977 by Macmillan Publishers. This began a series of baseball quiz books.

Since 1987, Nemec has authored or co-authored over 20 books on baseball, many focusing on the game's early years as a professional sport, which became his specialty as a baseball historian. In the 1990s, he published The Rules of Baseball (1994), which looked at the evolution of rules; The Beer and Whisky League (1995), a history of the American Association; and The Great Encyclopedia of Nineteenth Century Major League Baseball (1997). His works have been anthologized in collections such as Spitball magazine, The Four Dynasties of the New York Yankees, Nine, and Survival Prose.

Nemec has received a number of awards, including the Sporting News Research Award, the Henry Chadwick Award, and the McFarland Baseball Research Award; playwriting grants from Impossible Ragtime Theater and the Huntington Playhouse; and fellowships and residencies from Yaddo, MacDowell, Virginia Center for the Creative Arts, and the Edward F. Albee Foundation. He has taught writing at College of Marin, St. Mark's Church in-the-Bowery, and prisons in the San Francisco Bay area. Nemec is also a member of the Society for American Baseball Research.

== Personal life ==
Nemec lives in Laguna Woods, California, with his wife, teacher and author Marilyn Foster, and is the stepfather of the film and TV actress Kat Foster and associate film producer Alex Foster. He has lived in the Bay Area since 1983. Nemec previously played baseball with the Oaks, a senior league team in San Francisco. He also co-manages a nationwide baseball fantasy league that allows users to draft players from throughout history.

== Selected publications ==
- Novels
  - 1980: Bright Lights, Dark Rooms
  - 1982: Mad Blood
  - 1985: The Systems of M.R. Shurnas
  - 2010: Stonesifer
  - 2012: Who's Dicing the Daughters of Pan?
  - 2013: The Picture Maker
  - 2015: Early Dreams
- Baseball nonfiction
  - 1992: The Great American Baseball Team Book
  - 1993: Players of Coopertown with Matthew D. Greenberger, Dan Schlossberg, Dick Johnson, and Mike Tully
  - 1994: The Rules of Baseball
  - 1995: The Beer and Whisky League
  - 1997: Encyclopedia of Nineteenth Century Major League Baseball
  - 1999: The Great Book of Baseball Knowledge
  - 2004: 100 years of baseball with Saul Wisnia
  - 2007: The Baseball Chronicle (anthology)
  - 2011: Great Baseball Feats, Facts & Firsts with Scott Flatow and Dave Zeman
  - 2011: Major League Baseball Profiles, Vol. 1 & 2
  - 2012: The Rank and File of 19th Century Major League Baseball with John Thorn
  - 2014: Forfeits and Successfully Protested Games in Major League Baseball with Eric Miklich
  - 2017: No-Hitters (anthology)
  - 2019: Incredible Baseball Trivia: More than 200 Hardball Questions for the Thinking Fan
  - 2020: The Official Rules of Baseball (illustrated)
