= Bob McConnell =

American baseball historian

Robert Churchill McConnell (January 18, 1925 – March 18, 2012) was a founding member of the Society for American Baseball Research (SABR), serving as its secretary and treasurer. In 1985, he won the first Bob Davids Award, SABR's highest honor.

== Early life ==
McConnell was born on January 18, 1925, in Seattle, Washington, though he moved around continuously throughout his youth. His family settled in Newark, New Jersey, in 1935.

He joined the Navy in 1942, serving on the U.S.S. Whitman and U.S.S. Mifflin during his first three years in the service. He was sent for officer training at Vanderbilt University in July 1945, whence he earned a Bachelor of Science in mechanical engineering in 1949.

== Baseball research endeavors ==
McConnell is credited with finding, filling in and fixing considerable amounts of missing, incomplete or incorrect historical baseball information, especially that concerning home runs. His work largely included seeking out old box scores, gleaning statistics and details from those, his new findings and sharing them with other baseball research enthusiasts — many of whom would be among the founding SABR members. Considered an expert on home runs, he co-wrote the book The Home Run Encyclopedia. His expertise was cited by the St. Louis Post-Dispatch, Associated Press and The Press of Atlantic City, among others.

He died on March 18, 2012, in Newark, Delaware.

In 2018, McConnell was presented the Henry Chadwick Award by the Society for American Baseball Research for his excellence in preserving the history of baseball.
