= Larry Lester =

Negro league baseball historian (b. 1949)

George Lawrence Lester (born 1949 in Charleston, Arkansas) is a Negro league baseball author, historian, statistical researcher, and lecturer.

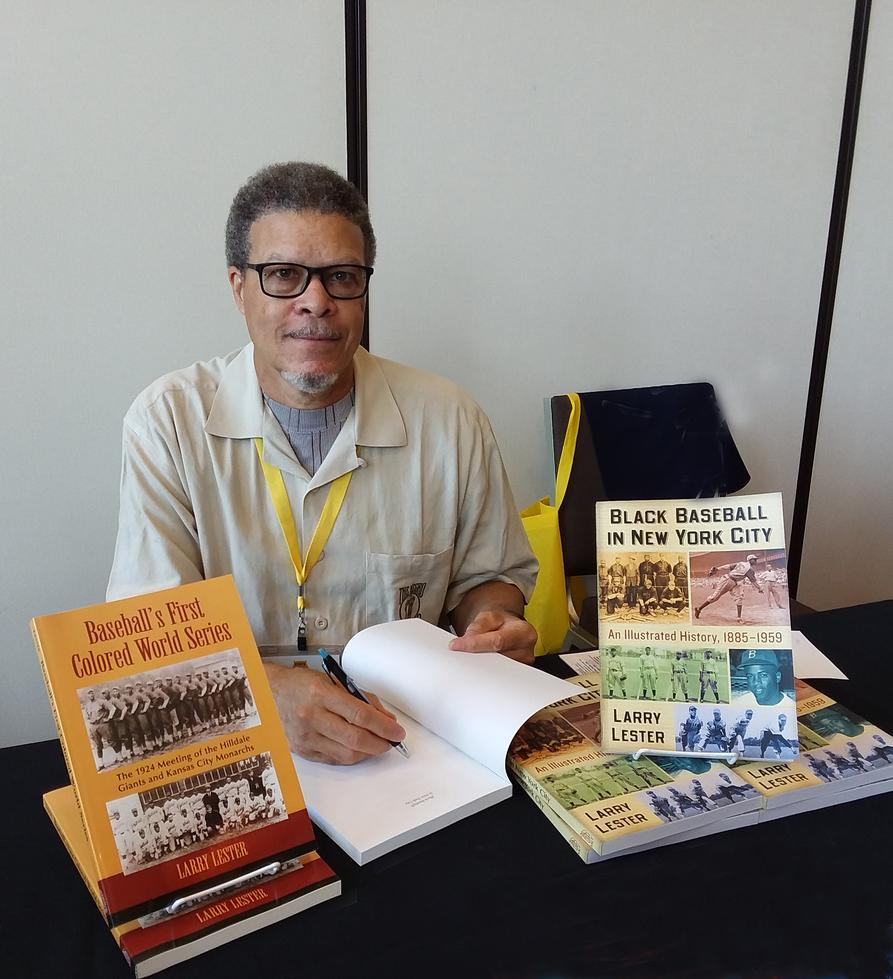
Larry Lester at SABR 48, Pittsburgh, PA, 2018

== Biography ==
Larry Lester is the former chairman of the Society for American Baseball Research's Negro League Committee, which hosts the annual Jerry Malloy Negro League Conference, a symposium dedicated exclusively to the examination and promotion of black baseball history. He co-founded the Negro Leagues Baseball Museum (NLBM) in Kansas City, Missouri, and served as its Research Director, Senior Editor, and Treasurer from 1991 to 1995. He was described as "a driving force in the NLBM's licensing program" that generated $1.4 million in its start-up years. Through using available black and white photographs as guides, doing research of archival newspapers, and conducting interviews of former players, Lester discovered the authentic Negro league colors and designs, allowing apparel manufacturers to reproduce retro-vintage caps, jerseys, and jackets. The NLBM licenses generated approximately $6,000,000 in sales in 1992, with Major League Baseball Properties producing $2.4 billion.

Lester founded NoirTech Research, an internet-based company, in 1995. It provides sports scholarships to the news media, professional sports teams, educational institutions, museums, corporations, libraries, and churches. He co-chaired the National Baseball Hall of Fame and Museum's Out of the Shadows Negro Leagues Baseball Research program and served on the Hall of Fame's Special Negro Leagues Committee which inducted a record 17 Negro leaguers in 2006. He is listed as a contributing researcher to more than 220 publications on African American history.

== Civic contributions through the Jerry Malloy Negro League Conference ==
- Annually provides four national scholarships to high school seniors, via the Thomas R. Garrett Memorial Scholarship Family, to high school seniors. Seniors are required to write essays on four selected topics.
- Annually provides two monetary library grants, via the Richard Clark Memorial Library Grant, to public schools to enriched education, using sports as a learning instrument.

== Bibliography ==
Lester has authored, co-authored, or edited several books about Negro Baseball League history.

=== As sole author ===
- Black Baseball's National Showcase: The East-West All-Star Game, 1933-1953, published 2002 by University of Nebraska Press, Lincoln, NE. Winner of The Sporting News-SABR Baseball Research Award, that honors outstanding research projects that have significantly expanded the country's knowledge or understanding of baseball.
- Baseball's First Colored World Series: The 1924 Meeting of the Hilldale Giants and Kansas City Monarchs, published 2006 by McFarland Publishing, Jefferson, NC
- Rube Foster in His Time: On the Field and in the Papers with Black Baseball's Greatest Visionary, published 2012 by McFarland Publishing
- Black Baseball in New York City: An Illustrated History, 1885-1959, published 2017 by McFarland
- Black Baseball's National Showcase: The East-West All-Star Game, 1933-1962, Expanded Version published by NoirTech Research, 2000

=== As co-author ===
- Black Baseball In Chicago (with Dick Clark and Sammy J. Miller), published 2000 by Arcadia Publishing, Charleston, SC
- Black Baseball In Detroit (with Dick Clark and Sammy J. Miller), published 2000 by Arcadia Publishing
- Black Baseball In Kansas City (with Sammy J. Miller), published 2000 by Arcadia Publishing
- Black Baseball In Pittsburgh (with Sammy J. Miller), published 2001 by Arcadia Publishing
- The Negro Leagues Book: The Players 1862-1960, Volume 2 (with Wayne Stivers), published by NoirTech Research, 2000

=== As Editor/Writer ===
- The Negro Leagues Book (with Dick Clark), published 1994, Society for American Baseball Research, Cleveland, OH
- Black Ball: A Negro Leagues Journal, "Can You Read, Judge Landis?" published Fall 2008, McFarland Publishers, Jefferson, NC
- National Pastime Museum, staff writer, 2013-2018
- The Courier, editor of quarterly newsletter, 1993 to 2022

=== Forewords Written ===
- Twenty Years Too Soon by Quincy Trouppe. Reprinted in 1995
- Ruling Over Monarchs, Giants & Stars: Umpiring in the Negro Leagues & Beyond by Bob Motley (2007)
- When to Stop the Cheering: The Black Press, the Black Community and the Integration of Professional Baseball by Dr. Brian Carroll (2007)
- Our White Boy: the Jerry Craft Story (2010)
- The Black Press and Black Baseball, 1915 - 1955: A Devil's Bargain by Dr. Brian Carroll (2015)
- Black Stats Matter by Philip Lee (2023)

=== As consultant/advisor ===
- Hall of Fame Negro League Advisory Committee, the "Blue Ribbon Committee," with Roy Campanella, Monte Irvin, Buck O'Neil, Dr. Jules Tygiel and Tweed Webb (1993).
- Black Diamonds: Blues City, the story of the Memphis Red Sox (1994)
- "Shadow Ball" chapter in Baseball, the Ken Burns documentary (1995)
- "Journey of the African American Athlete" by HBO (1996)
- "Legacy of Jackie Robinson: Breaking the Line" by ESPN (1997)
- "Chasing the Dream", Hank Aaron documentary by HBO (1998)
- "100 Years of ESPN Sports Century", Willie Mays and Hank Aaron segments (1999)
- "Dare to Compete: The Struggle of Women in Sports" by HBO (1999)
- Served on the United States Postal Service Advisory Board for the "Legends of Baseball" stamps series (2000) and for the Andrew "Rube" Foster stamp with award-winning artist Kadir Nelson.
- Traveling exhibit, Exhibits USA's "National Pastime in Black and White: The Negro Baseball Leagues, 1867-1955", from 2003 to 2006.
- Grand Rapids Museum and Library exhibit, "A League of Their Own" from February – September, 2003
- Historical consultant for The League, a baseball documentary by Magnolia Pictures and RadicalMedia (2023) produced by Sam Pollard
- Curatorial consultant for the National Baseball Hall of Fame's "Souls of the Game: Voices of Black Baseball" exhibit, 2023-24

== Exhibit developer, designer and/or advisor ==
- "Stamps of Recognition": an 80-panel exhibit of 60 prominent Jazz greats, abolitionists, writers, historians, actors and entertainers using stamps, currency, and coins as mediums.
- "Crowning Achievements: Baseball Caps from the Black Leagues" - An exhibit featuring 20 rare baseball caps from 18 teams, worn by some of the greatest Negro leagues stars
- "The Currency of Change": a 25-panel overview of African Americans on monetary instruments issued by the U.S. Treasury and the U.S. Mint.
- "Discover Greatness!": Developed original static exhibits at the Negro Leagues Baseball Museum (1990-1994).
- "Pride & Passion: The African American Baseball Experience". Touring exhibit created by the National Baseball Hall of Fame and Museum
- Text writer for the Negro leagues exhibit at Comiskey Park for the Chicago White Sox, 1992
- Developed and designed a Homestead Grays and Pittsburgh Crawfords exhibit for the Pittsburgh Pirates, 1996
- Provided photographs and historical information on the Philadelphia Stars for an exhibit at [Citizens Bank Park] for the Philadelphia Phillies, 2004
- Developed the exhibit, "The National Pastime in Black & White: The Negro Baseball Leagues, 1867-1955" - a pictorial history of black baseball, which toured nationally 2003 to 2006 in museums, libraries and academic institutions
- Designer and developer for "Beyond the Help: The Role of the African American Maid on the Silver Screen" exhibit.
- Designer and developer for "A Laughing Matter: Black Sitcoms in Review from 1950 to 2000" exhibit.
- Curator for The True Black History Museum's Negro League exhibit for the Detroit Tigers.

== Awards ==
- Black Collectors Hall of Fame inductee, 1993 - an organization that honored collectors for the preservation of oral, written and visual artifacts by and about people of African Diaspora.
- SABR Henry Chadwick Award, 2016 - The Chadwick award honors baseball's great researchers, historians, statisticians, annalists, and archivists—for their invaluable contributions to making baseball the game that links America's present with its past.
- SABR Bob Davids Award, 2017 - This award honors contributions to baseball that reflect the ingenuity, integrity, and self-sacrifice of the founder and past president of SABR, L. Robert "Bob" Davids.
