= Robert L. Tiemann =

American baseball historian

- Occupations: Writer, historian
- Writing career
- Period: 1980s–present
- Subjects: Baseball in 19th-century USA, in St. Louis, in Brooklyn
- Notable awards: Bob Davids Award; 1992

Robert L. Tiemann is an American baseball historian based in St. Louis, and a member of SABR (the Society of American Baseball Research). He is considered a 19th-century baseball expert.

Tiemann has written or edited several baseball books, including Nineteenth Century Stars, Baseball's First Stars, Cardinal Classics: Outstanding Games from Each of the St. Louis Baseball Clubs 100 Seasons and The National Pastime: A Review of Baseball History (Volume 10). In 1992, he received SABR's Bob Davids Award, the organization's highest honor.

== Selected works ==
- Baseball's First Stars, Frederick Ivor-Campbell, Robert L. Tiemann, Mark Rucker, Society for American Baseball Research, 1996, ISBN 0-910137-58-7
- 10 Rings: Stories of the St. Louis Cardinals World Championships, James Rygelski, Robert L. Tiemann, Reedy Pr, 2011, ISBN 1-935806-03-3
- Dodger classics: outstanding games from each of the Dodgers' 101 seasons, 1883–1983, Robert L. Tiemann, Baseball Histories, 1983, ISBN 0-9608534-1-3
- Mound City memories: baseball in St. Louis, Robert L. Tiemann, SABR, 2007, ISBN 1-933599-06-5
- Cardinal classics: outstanding games from each of the St. Louis Baseball Club's 100 seasons, 1882–1981, Robert L. Tiemann, Baseball Histories, 1982, ISBN 0-9608534-0-5
