= 1938 Baseball Hall of Fame balloting =

Elections to the Baseball Hall of Fame

National Baseball

Hall of Fame and Museum
- New inductees: 3
- via BBWAA: 1
- via Centennial Commission: 2
- Total inductees: 16
- Induction date: June 12, 1939

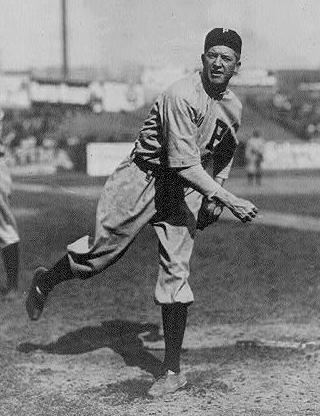
1938 BBWAA inductee Grover Cleveland Alexander

The 1938 elections to select inductees to the Baseball Hall of Fame were conducted along much the same lines as the 1937 vote. Toward the goal of 10 initial inductees from the 20th century, eight had now been selected; members of the Baseball Writers' Association of America (BBWAA) were once again given authority to select any players active in the 20th century, excepting active players. The Centennial Commission retained the responsibility of selecting inductees whose contributions were largely as non-players.

As the obvious stars had already been elected, only pitcher Grover Cleveland Alexander was selected via the BBWAA ballot. The Centennial Commission selected Alexander Cartwright and Henry Chadwick.

== BBWAA vote ==
In the BBWAA election, voters were instructed to cast votes for 10 candidates. Any candidate receiving votes on at least 75% of the ballots would be honored with induction to the Hall upon its opening in the sport's supposed centennial year of 1939. Individuals who had been barred from baseball, though not formally ineligible, no longer received even the minimal support given them in the two prior elections.

A total of 262 ballots were cast, with 2,475 individual votes for 120 specific candidates, an average of 9.45 per ballot; 197 votes were required for election. The balloting was dominated by players of the 1900s and 1910s, rather than those of the more recent two decades; the results were announced in January 1938. The sole candidate who received at least 75% of the vote and was elected is indicated in bold italics; candidates who have since been selected in subsequent elections are indicated in italics:

Player	Votes	Percent	Change
**Grover Cleveland Alexander**	212	80.9	▲18.7%
George Sisler	179	68.3	▲15.6%
Willie Keeler	177	67.6	▲10.4%
Eddie Collins	175	66.8	▲9.6%
Rube Waddell	148	56.5	▲23.2%
Frank Chance	133	50.8	▲26.4%
Ed Delahanty	132	50.4	▲15.6%
Ed Walsh	110	42.0	▲14.1%
Johnny Evers	91	34.7	▲12.8%
Jimmy Collins	79	30.2	▼2.6%
Rabbit Maranville	73	27.9	▲15.5%
Roger Bresnahan	67	25.6	▲4.2%
Fred Clarke	63	24.0	▲13.1%
Mordecai Brown	54	20.6	▲5.2%
Miller Huggins	48	18.3	▲15.8%
Rogers Hornsby	46	17.6	▼8.8%
Ray Schalk	45	17.2	▲5.3%
Ross Youngs	40	15.3	▲7.3%
Eddie Plank	38	14.5	▲3.1%
Herb Pennock	37	14.1	▲6.6%
Joe McGinnity	36	13.7	▲7.7%
Chief Bender	33	12.6	▲4.1%
Frank Baker	32	12.2	▲5.7%
Johnny Kling	26	9.9	▼0.1%
Hugh Duffy	24	9.2	▲5.7%
Hughie Jennings	23	8.8	▲6.8%
Addie Joss	18	6.9	▲1.4%
Wilbert Robinson	17	6.5	▲4.0%
Joe Tinker	16	6.1	▼1.4%
Harry Heilmann	14	5.3	▲0.3%
Nap Rucker	12	4.6	▼0.9%
Babe Adams	11	4.2	▲0.2%
Sam Crawford	11	4.2	▲1.7%
Lou Criger	11	4.2	▼3.8%
Clark Griffith	10	3.8	▲1.8%
Rube Marquard	10	3.8	▼2.7%
Dazzy Vance	10	3.8	▼1.2%
Edd Roush	9	3.4	▼1.6%
Hank Gowdy	8	3.1	▲2.1%
Amos Rusie	8	3.1	▲2.6%
Fred Tenney	8	3.1	▲0.6%
Nick Altrock	7	2.7	▲1.2%
Jimmy Archer	7	2.7	▼0.3%
Earle Combs	7	2.7	▲0.7%
Bill Terry	7	2.7	-
Bobby Wallace	7	2.7	▲2.2%
Zack Wheat	7	2.7	▲0.2%
Max Carey	6	2.3	▼0.7%
Smoky Joe Wood	6	2.3	▼4.2%
Mike Donlin	5	1.9	▼1.1%
Duffy Lewis	5	1.9	▲0.4%
Art Nehf	5	1.9	▲0.4%
Bill Carrigan	4	1.5	▼1.0%
Bill Dinneen	4	1.5	-
Larry Doyle	4	1.5	▲0.5%
Harry Hooper	4	1.5	▼1.5%
Stuffy McInnis	4	1.5	▲1.0%
Jack Barry	3	1.1	-
George Burns	3	1.1	▼0.4%
Art Fletcher	3	1.1	▲0.1%
Heinie Groh	3	1.1	▲0.6%
Dickey Kerr	3	1.1	▲0.6%
Kid Nichols	3	1.1	-
Pie Traynor	3	1.1	-
Dave Bancroft	2	0.8	▼0.7%
Bill Bradley	2	0.8	▼1.7%
Jesse Burkett	2	0.8	▲0.3%
Jack Chesbro	2	0.8	▲0.3%
Jack Coombs	2	0.8	▼0.2%
Gavvy Cravath	2	0.8	▼0.2%
Kid Elberfeld	2	0.8	▲0.3%
Eddie Foster	2	0.8	-
Joe Judge	2	0.8	▲0.3%
Sherry Magee	2	0.8	▼0.2%
Roger Peckinpaugh	2	0.8	▼0.7%
Eppa Rixey	2	0.8	▲0.3%
Ossee Schreckengost	2	0.8	▼0.2%
Everett Scott	2	0.8	▼0.2%
Casey Stengel	2	0.8	-
Ginger Beaumont	1	0.4	-
Marty Bergen	1	0.4	▼0.6%
Ray Chapman	1	0.4	-
Andy Coakley	1	0.4	-
Wilbur Cooper	1	0.4	-
Stan Coveleski	1	0.4	-
Doc Crandall	1	0.4	-
Walton Cruise	1	0.4	-
Bill Dahlen	1	0.4	-
Jake Daubert	1	0.4	▼0.6%
Wild Bill Donovan	1	0.4	▼1.1%
Red Dooin	1	0.4	▼0.1%
Joe Dugan	1	0.4	▼0.1%
Howard Ehmke	1	0.4	-
Red Faber	1	0.4	▼1.1%
Elmer Flick	1	0.4	-
Kid Gleason	1	0.4	▼0.1%
Eddie Grant	1	0.4	-
Burleigh Grimes	1	0.4	▼0.1%
Bucky Harris	1	0.4	-
Buck Herzog	1	0.4	-
Charlie Irwin	1	0.4	-
Fielder Jones	1	0.4	-
Arlie Latham	1	0.4	-
Hans Lobert	1	0.4	▼0.6%
Herman Long	1	0.4	▼0.1%
Dolf Luque	1	0.4	▼0.1%
Firpo Marberry	1	0.4	-
Bob Meusel	1	0.4	▼0.1%
Clyde Milan	1	0.4	-
Pat Moran	1	0.4	▼0.1%
Red Murray	1	0.4	▼0.1%
Hub Perdue	1	0.4	-
Sam Rice	1	0.4	-
Jimmy Sheckard	1	0.4	-
Urban Shocker	1	0.4	-
Jake Stahl	1	0.4	-
Gabby Street	1	0.4	▼0.1%
Ira Thomas	1	0.4	-
Cy Williams	1	0.4	-
Chief Zimmer	1	0.4	-

Key to colors
Elected to the Hall. These individuals are also indicated in **bold italics**.
Players who were elected in future elections. These individuals are also indicated in plain italics.

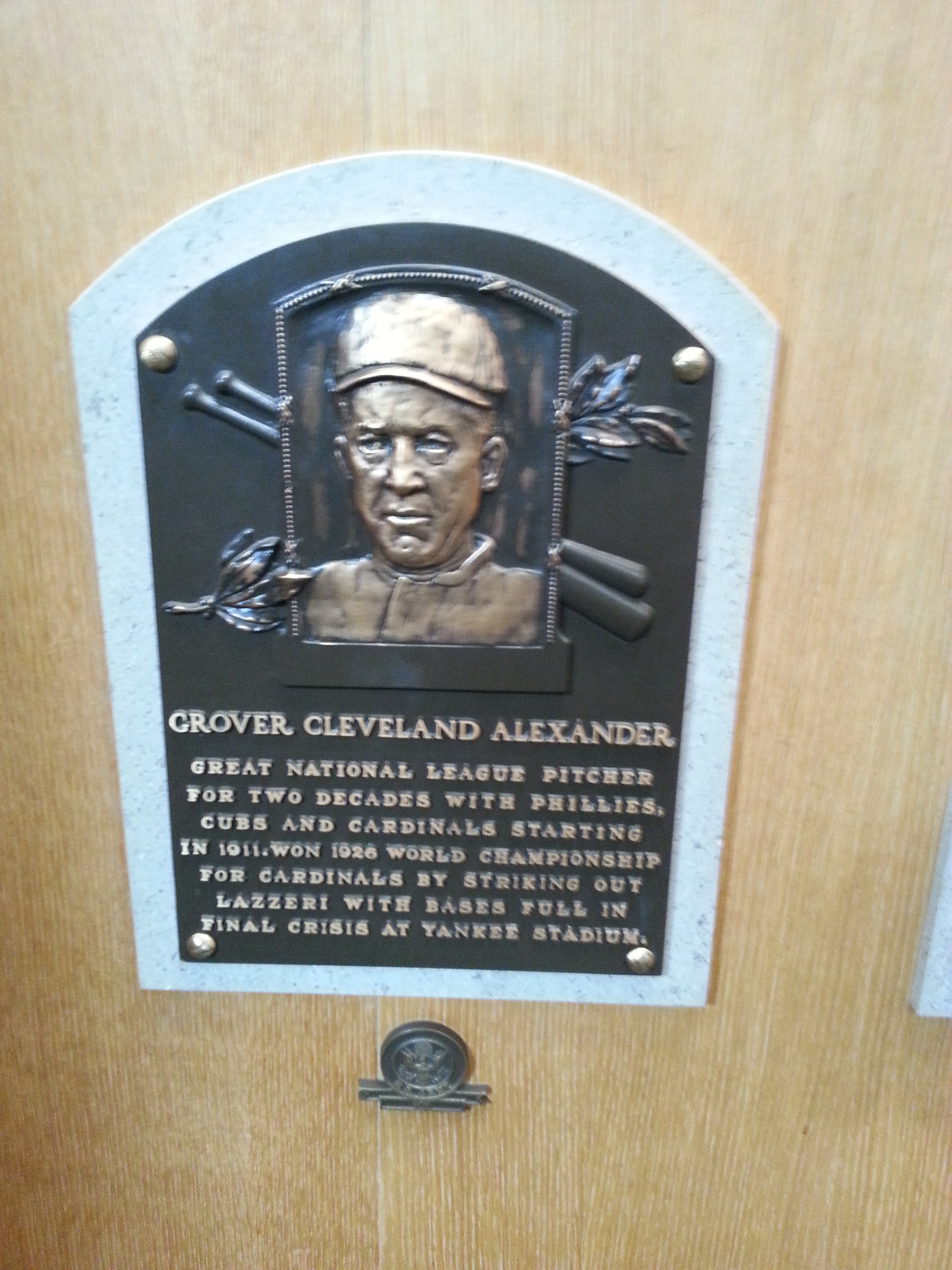
Alexander's plaque in Cooperstown

== Centennial Commission ==
Once again, the Hall opted to have this small committee of six members select inductees "for outstanding service to base ball apart from playing the game." After selecting five individuals in 1937, the Commission chose two inductees at the major league winter meetings in New York City in December 1938, though the choices were not announced until the following month:

- Alexander Cartwright, who had been instrumental in organizing some of the game's first teams in the 1840s and had moved to establish the game's first consistent playing rules; and
- Henry Chadwick, a sportswriter who had tirelessly promoted the game in the late 19th century and had been a major force in revision of the rules through several decades. To date he is the only sportswriter (or commentator) to be inducted into the real Hall of Fame (as opposed to the writers' and commentators' "wings").
