= Dick Beverage =

American baseball historian

- Born: Richard E. Beverage; November 21, 1935; Omaha, Nebraska, U.S.
- Died: September 25, 2023 (aged 87); Orange County, California, U.S.
- Education: Colgate University, Golden Gate University
- Occupations: Baseball historian, author
- Known for: Founder of Pacific Coast League Historical Society, President of Society for American Baseball Research
- Spouse: Rae Beverage
- Children: 2
- Awards: Bob Davids Award (2013)

Richard Beverage (November 21, 1935 – September 24, 2023), known as Dick Beverage, was an American baseball historian who served as the President of Society for American Baseball Research. He was inducted into the Pacific Coast League Hall of Fame in 2017, along with Les Scarsella.

== Early life ==
Beverage was born on November 21, 1935, in Omaha, Nebraska to Richard and Mary Beverage. He moved to Oakland, California in 1946 and became an avid fan of the Oakland Oaks (PCL). He graduated from Colgate University with a degree in history and received a Master of Business Administration from Golden Gate University.

== Baseball historian ==
Beverage founded the Pacific Coast League Historical Society (PCLHS) in 1987 and served as its president from its inception until 2016.

He was an extremely active member of Society for American Baseball Research, participating on at least 10 different committees. In addition to serving as president of SABR from 2003 to 2009 (3-terms), he served as vice president from 1995 to 1998 (2-terms) and secretary from 1999 to 2002. beverage holds the record for having served 13 years on the SABR Board. He also served as the chair of the Seymour Medal selection committee.

Beverage served as Secretary-Treasurer of the Association of Professional Baseball Players of America (APBPA) for 18 years. The APBPA provides financial assistance to various personnel involved in baseball's major and minor leagues.

=== Awards and recognition ===
Beverage won the Bob Davids Award in 2013. The award, SABR's highest honor, is given to those SABR members whose contributions to SABR and baseball best reflect the virtues of its founder, Bob Davids. He was inducted into the Pacific Coast League Hall of Fame in 2017, along with Les Scarsella. He was one of about four people elected to the PCLHOF who never played professional baseball, coached, or served as an executive.

In 2005, Beverage received the Baseball Reliquary Tony Salin Memorial Award. The award honors individuals who acted to preserve baseball's history.

=== Publications ===
Beverage wrote over a dozen articles and published four books on baseball. His publications include:

Books

- The Los Angeles Angels of the Pacific Coast League: A History, 1903-1957, by Richard Beverage, McFarland & Company, 2011;
- The Hollywood Stars, by Richard Beverage, Arcadia Publishing Co., 2005;
- Hollywood Stars Baseball in Movieland, 1926-1957, by Richard Beverage, Arcadia Press, 1984; and
- The Angels: Los Angeles in the Pacific Coast League, 1919-1957, by Richard Beverage, Deacon Press, 1981.

Articles/newsletters

- Editor/publisher of the bimonthly newsletter, Pacific Coast League Potpourri;
- When the Angels and Stars Ruled Los Angeles, by Dick Beverage, The National Pastime: Endless Seasons: Baseball in Southern California (2011);
- The Missions: San Francisco’s Other Team, by Dick Beverage, Road Trips: SABR Convention Journal Articles (1998);
- Good Enough to Dream in Upstate New York, by Dick Beverage, The Empire State of Baseball (SABR 19, 1989);
- A Survey of Minor League Literature, by Dick Beverage, The SABR Review of Books, Volume III (1988).

== Personal life ==
Beverage was married to his wife, Rae, in 1958 and they had two kids. Beverage died on September 24, 2023.
