= David W. Vincent =

American baseball official scorer, statistician, and historian

Vincent

David William Vincent (July 26, 1949 – July 2, 2017) was an American baseball official scorer, statistician, and historian. He was called "The Sultan of Swats Stats" by ESPN and was often quoted by Major League Baseball, ESPN, Fox, USA Today, and other media outlets regarding the history of the home run.

== Biography ==
Vincent was born in Waltham, Massachusetts, and he studied music, earning an undergraduate degree and a doctorate. After a stint as a band director, Vincent went to work as a computer programmer for Electronic Data Systems (EDS) and for Hewlett Packard once they bought out EDS. Vincent lived in Centreville, Virginia.

A long-time member of SABR, he kept SABR's official home run statistics, and was presented with the organization's highest honor, the Bob Davids Award, in 1999. Vincent was also an official scorer for the Washington Nationals and the founding secretary of Retrosheet, which is collecting play-by-play accounts of every game in major league history. In addition to his work with home runs, Vincent had a special research interest in the history of umpiring.

Vincent wrote several books including:

- Home Run: The Definitive History of Baseball's Ultimate Weapon
- The Midsummer Classic: A Complete History of Baseball's All-Star Game. (co-author)
- Home Run's Most Wanted: The Top 10 Book of Monumental Dingers, Prodigious Swingers, and Everything Long-Ball
- The Ultimate Red Sox Home Run Guide (co-author)
- Home Runs in the Old Ballparks: Who Hit the First, the Last, and the Most Round-Trippers in Our Former Major League Parks, 1876-1994

Vincent died in Centreville on July 2, 2017, from stomach cancer. He was 67.
