= Jerry Malloy Negro League Conference =

The Jerry Malloy Negro League Conference (JMNLC) is an annual conference sponsored by Negro leagues Committee (NLC), a standing committee of the Society for American Baseball Research (SABR), a non-profit 501(c)(3) organization. As of 2016, the NLC has held nineteen conferences in various cities known for their history in hosting Negro league baseball teams. The JMNLC is the first and remains the only such event dedicated exclusively to the examination of black baseball history.

The objective of the conference and committee is to encourage the study and research of Negro league baseball, pre-Negro league baseball, African-Americans in baseball, and the positive influence on American society by the elimination of racial barriers. This national conference attracts scholars, historians, collectors, social activists, and fans of the game. The Conference focus includes scholarly, literary, and educational components.

== History of the Conference ==
The Conference has been an annual SABR event since 1998, and was named in memory of Jerry Malloy (1946–2000) after his death. Malloy was a journalist and was considered by his peers in SABR to be a skilled authority on 19th century black baseball. Malloy was an important member of the Negro Leagues Committee and a respected researcher and historian. Admission to the conference is open to all.

The 2016 conference is being held in Kansas City, Missouri, July 7–9. Past conferences have been held in Harrisburg, Pennsylvania (1998, 2000, 2003), Kansas City, Missouri (2001, 2006), Chicago, Illinois (2005, 2008), Atlantic City, New Jersey (1999), Memphis, Tennessee (2002), Cleveland, Ohio (2004, 2012), Portsmouth, Virginia (2007), Pittsburgh, Pennsylvania (2009, 2015), Birmingham, Alabama (2010), Indianapolis, Indiana (2011), Newark, New Jersey (2013) and Detroit, Michigan (2014).

Since 2004, the conference has also included an update on the Negro Leagues Baseball Grave Marker Project.

== Awards ==
The SABR Negro Leagues Committee announces the following awards during the conference:

- The Robert Peterson Recognition Award: for bodies of work that increase public awareness about the Negro leagues, akin to Peterson's book "Only The Ball Was White."
- The John Coates Next Generation Award: for recognition of outstanding achievement and dedication by newcomers to the research field.
- The Normal "Tweed" Webb Lifetime Achievement Award: to recognize long-term contributions to the field of Negro league research.
- The Fay Vincent Most Valuable Partner (MVP) Award: for the contributor with the greatest impact towards a successful conference and shares former Commissioner Vincent's vision to recognize the Negro leagues and its impact on the socialization of American culture.

== Events and Programs ==
Between ten and 14 research presentations are given at every conference, ranging from historical research to statistical studies to entertaining stories, covering any subject related to the history of African-American baseball. A trivia contest (related to Negro leagues history) with prizes for the winner is held, and two auctions (one silent, one live) are conducted. Fundraising is also done to help pay to mark the graves of former Negro league players. The effort, known as the Negro Leagues Baseball Grave Marker Project has provided a headstone for more than 30 players since 2004.

An authors panel is held, and book signings are done afterward. A bus tour is done of most host cities, citing the memorable spots related to that city's Negro leagues history, and an awards banquet is held in which the four named awards are announced, plus two $2,500 youth scholarships, based upon submitted essays, and two $1,000 library grants. A seminar on Negro leagues history is held during the conference for education professionals, and an academic journal, based on presentations made during the conference, is published later in the year in partnership with McFarland & Company.
