= Dorothy Seymour Mills =

American baseball historian (1928–2019)

- Seymour Mills in the 1990s
- Born: Dorothy Jane Zander; July 5, 1928; Cleveland, Ohio, U.S.
- Died: November 17, 2019 (aged 91); Tucson, Arizona, U.S.
- Education: Fenn College; Case Western Reserve University (B.A.)
- Occupations: Author; Baseball researcher; Novelist
- Spouse: Harold Seymour (m. 1949; died 1992) Roy E. Mills (m. 1995; died 2012)
- Writing career
- Notable work: Baseball trilogy
- Website: dorothyjanemills.com

Dorothy Jane Mills (née Zander; July 5, 1928 – November 17, 2019), known as Dorothy Seymour Mills, was an American baseball researcher, author, and novelist who authored and co-authored over thirty books, fiction and non-fiction, over her life.

Seymour Mills is best known as the co-author the Baseball trilogy with her first husband Harold Seymour: Baseball: The Early Years, Baseball: The Golden Age, and Baseball: The People's Game. The Baseball series is recognized as the first in-depth scholarly analysis of the sport's history and continues to be referenced in modern research. Uncredited during her husband's lifetime, Seymour Mills finally received co-authorship credits in 2011.

== Biography ==
Seymour Mills was born Dorothy Jane Zander in Cleveland, Ohio, the daughter of Henry and Katherine Zander. Her father was a printer, and her mother was a homemaker. Mills attended Fenn College (later renamed Cleveland State University), where she majored in English and worked on the campus literary magazine. She met her future husband Harold Seymour while attending Fenn College, where he was a professor. They married in 1949 after which she transferred to Case Western Reserve University where she completed her studies.

The couple lived in New York and Massachusetts where Harold taught in colleges while Seymour Mills taught in elementary schools. She also worked for a Boston publishing company and wrote numerous children's books. After her husband gave up teaching, the couple moved around, for a time living in Ireland even, before settling in New Hampshire. Dorothy was widowed when Harold died of Alzheimer's disease; the couple had no children.

After a few years, she remarried to Roy Mills, a former Royal Canadian Air Force officer and settled down with him in Naples, Florida. During her second marriage, she began writing novels under the name "Dorothy Jane Mills". Seymour Mills was widowed again after Mills died in 2011.

Seymour Mills died in Tucson, Arizona, after complications from an ulcer. She was 91.

== Authorship credit controversy ==
When Harold Seymour was approached by Oxford University Press to write a book about baseball history, he ended up relying heavily on his wife who later said he could not type and hated research. Seymour Mills – who was not a fan of baseball – did majority of the research, organized material, structured the notes for the first and second volumes of the work, and edited his manuscripts. For the third volume, Harold Seymour's health had deteriorated significantly, and Dorothy wrote most of it by herself.

During Harold's lifetime, Dorothy did not get any credit for her contributions. Seymour Mills later said: "Everyone assumed that he had done all that work by himself — that's what he wanted them to assume, but we were equal partners. All these things were done jointly. He just couldn't share credit. And I didn't say anything at the time, because at the time, wives just didn't do that."

After Seymour's death and her remarried, Seymour Mills wrote about her contributions in her memoirs A Woman's Work and, as early as 1993, her contributions had become publicly known, with the Society for American Baseball Research jointly honoring her and her husband. In 2011, Oxford University Press finally credited her as a co-author of the books Baseball: The Early Years, Baseball: The Golden Age, and Baseball: The People's Game. For the third book, her name now appears first.

== Legacy ==
The Seymour Medal, awarded annually by the Society for American Baseball Research (SABR) since 1996, was named in honor of Dorothy and Harold Seymour. In 2017, SABR created the Dorothy Seymour Mills Lifetime Achievement Award in her name to recognize "any person with a sustained involvement in women's baseball or any woman with a longtime involvement in baseball in any fashion." The most recent person to win this award is Jean Hastings Ardell, an author of two books about women in baseball who passed in 2022.

Along with her husband, Seymour Mills received SABR's inaugural Henry Chadwick Award in 2010. Initially, the award was only given to her husband. However, after female members of the organization protested, SABR quickly altered their decision and awarded the pair jointly.

=== Dorothy Seymour Mills Lifetime Achievement Award (women in baseball) winners ===
- 2026: Janet Marie Smith
- 2025: Jean Hastings Ardell
- 2024: Barbara Gregorich
- 2023: Maybelle Blair
- 2022: Justine Siegal
- 2021: Claire Smith
- 2020: Effa Manley
- 2019: Rachel Robinson
- 2018: Perry Barber

== Books ==
=== Baseball trilogy ===
- Baseball: The Early Years (1960), Oxford University Press, with Harold Seymour
- Baseball: The Golden Age (1971), Oxford University Press, with Harold Seymour
- Baseball: The People's Game (1990), Oxford University Press, ISBN 9780195038903, with Harold Seymour

=== Non-fiction ===
- A Woman's Work: Writing Baseball History with Harold Seymour, McFarland & Company, ISBN 9780786418480
- Chasing Baseball: Our Obsession with its History, Numbers, People and Places (2010), McFarland & Company, ISBN 9780786442898, with Richard C. Crepeau

=== Novels ===
- Drawing Card: A Baseball Novel (2012), McFarland & Company, ISBN 9780786468140
- First Mystery: The Kiss (2017), BluewaterPress, ISBN 9781604521306
- Second Mystery: The Wet Bathing Suit (2017), BluewaterPress, ISBN 9781604521313
- Third Mystery: The Phone Call (2017), BluewaterPress, ISBN 9781604521320
