= Henry Chadwick (writer) =

American baseball writer and statistician (1824–1908)

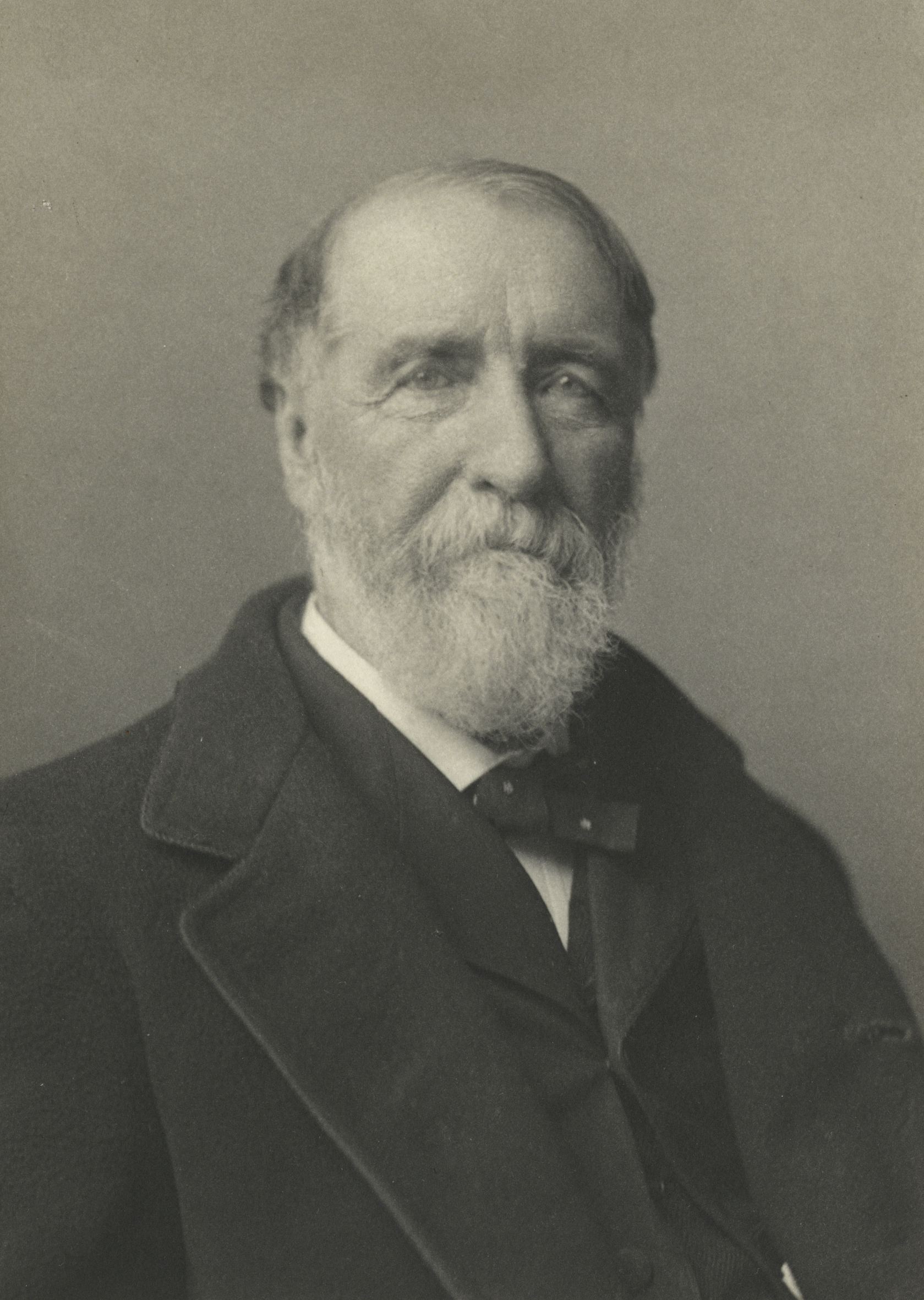
- Born: October 5, 1824; Exeter, England
- Died: April 20, 1908 (aged 83); Brooklyn, New York, U.S.
- Resting place: Green-Wood Cemetery
- Occupation: Sportswriter
- Writing career
- Period: circa 1850–1908
- Subjects: Baseball; Cricket
- Notable works: Beadle's Dime Base-Ball Player (1860–1881); DeWitt's Base-Ball Guide (1869–1885); Spalding's Official Base Ball Guide
- Baseball career

Member of the National

Baseball Hall of Fame
- Induction: 1938
- Election method: Centennial Commission

Henry Chadwick (October 5, 1824 – April 20, 1908) was an English-American sportswriter, baseball statistician and historian, often called the "Father of Baseball" for his early reporting on and contributions to the development of the game. He edited the first baseball guide sold to the public. He is credited with creating box scores, as well as creating the abbreviation "K" that designates a strikeout. He was posthumously inducted into the National Baseball Hall of Fame in 1938.

== Early life ==
Chadwick was born on October 5, 1824, in Exeter, England to James Chadwick and his second wife Theresa. His grandfather, Andrew Chadwick, had been a close friend of theologian John Wesley. His father, James Chadwick, was a supporter of the French Revolution who also tutored John Dalton in music and botany. James Chadwick had served as editor of a publication known as the Western Times.

Henry Chadwick was the much younger half-brother of Sir Edwin Chadwick who was born in 1800. Edwin was England's sanitary philosopher who developed environmental measures and laws designed to counteract the effects of the Industrial Revolution. Edwin Chadwick's mother died soon after Edwin’s birth.

Henry Chadwick moved to Brooklyn with his family at the age of 12, in the 1830s. He began to write music and to teach piano and guitar.

In 1848, Chadwick married Jane Botts from Richmond, Virginia. Botts' father Alexander had been president of the Virginia State Council. She was also related to politician John Botts. Chadwick edited John Botts' work titled The Great Rebellion. Chadwick and his wife had three children, Richard Westlake Chadwick, in 1849, Susan Mary Chadwick, in 1851, and Rose Virginia Chadwick, 1853.

Chadwick became a frequent player of cricket and similar ball games such as rounders. He began covering cricket for numerous local newspapers such as the Long Island Star. He first came across organized baseball in 1856 as a cricket reporter for The New York Times, watching a match played between New York's Eagles and Gothams at the Elysian Fields in Hoboken, New Jersey. He focused his attention as a journalist and writer on baseball after joining the New York Clipper in 1857, and was also soon hired on to provide coverage for other New York papers including the Sunday Mercury.

== Contributions to baseball ==
=== Promotion of the game ===
Chadwick was one of the prime movers in the rise of baseball from the 19th century to its popularity at the turn of the 20th century. A keen amateur statistician and professional writer, he helped sculpt the public perception of the game, as well as providing the basis for the records of teams' and players' achievements in the form of baseball statistics. He also served on baseball rules committees and influenced the game itself. He is sometimes referred to as "the father of baseball" because he facilitated the popularity of the sport in its early days. In a more recent view, Schiff suggests that Chadwick was the father of baseball because he nurtured the sport for decades, rather than a claim to have started the American game.

Early baseball had a provision known as the "bound rule", which held that a fielder could catch a batted ball on one bounce and that it would still be recorded as an out. Chadwick was an outspoken critic of the rule for many years, stating that fielders should have to catch a ball on the fly for it to count as an out. In 1864, the bound rule was eliminated for balls hit into fair territory. The bound rule for foul balls persisted into the 1880s.

Chadwick edited The Beadle Dime Base-Ball Player, the first annual baseball guide on public sale, as well as the Spalding and Reach annual guides for a number of years and in this capacity promoted the game and influenced the infant discipline of sports journalism. In his 1861 Beadle guide, he listed totals of games played, outs, runs, home runs, and strikeouts for hitters on prominent clubs, the first database of its kind. His goal was to provide numerical evidence to prove which players helped a team to win.

In 1867, he accompanied the National Base Ball Club of Washington, D.C., on their inaugural national tour, as their official scorer. The next year, Chadwick wrote the first hardcover baseball book, The Game of Base Ball. In 1874, he was instrumental in organizing a tour of England which included games of both baseball and cricket. In his role as journalist, he campaigned against the detrimental effects on the game of both alcohol and gambling.

Despite a friendship with Albert Spalding, Chadwick was scornful of the attempts to have Abner Doubleday declared the inventor of baseball. "He means well", said Chadwick, "but he don't know". Chadwick later willed his baseball library to Spalding.

Author William Cook wrote that "Chadwick was at times a bit self-aggrandizing, but his heart was always deeply rooted in looking after the best interest of the game." An 1876 Chicago Tribune article attacked Chadwick's status as the father of baseball, saying in part that Chadwick "has had enough experience to have made himself a man of respect had heaven but given him a head ... he proceeded to call himself the '"Father of the Game,' and to assume much on the strength of the title. But he found an unruly child, and one which disinherited him with rapidity and ease." Cook writes that Chadwick may have been a victim of "Western journalism", a sensationalized style of writing.

=== Box scores and statistics ===
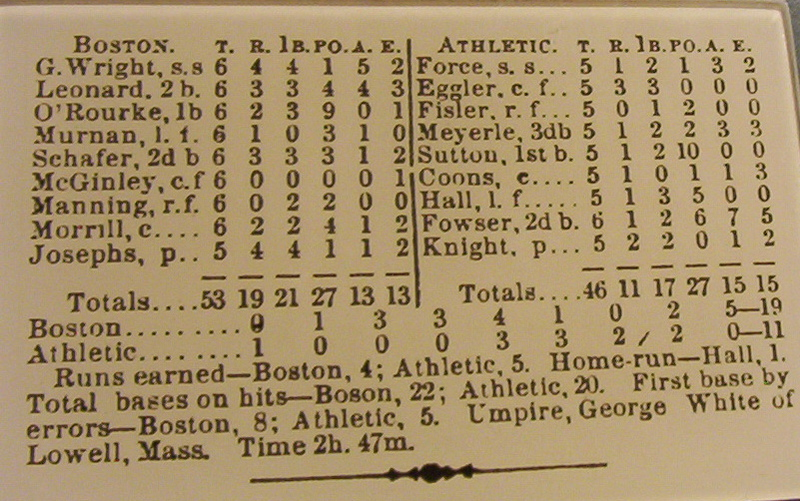
Box score from 1876

Chadwick is credited with devising the baseball box score (which he adapted from the cricket scorecard) for reporting game events. The first box score appeared in an 1859 issue of the Clipper. It was a grid with nine rows for players and nine columns for innings. The original box scores also created the often puzzling abbreviation for strikeout as "K" – "K" being the last letter of "struck" in "struck out". Chadwick assigned numbers to each defensive position for scorekeeping purposes, a system that remains in modern baseball scorekeeping.

Chadwick is credited with devising various statistical measures for baseball. He wrote in 1869: "In making up a score at the close of the match the record should be as follows:–Name of player, total number of times the first base was made by clean hits, total bases so made, left on bases after clean hits, and the number of times the first base has been made on errors..." This led to the recording of "clean" hits—times a batter reached base without benefit of an error. Further refinement by other early baseball proponents led to all National League teams calculating batting averages by 1876.

=== Journalistic style ===
The following description of a game was written by Henry Chadwick and appeared in his Base Ball Memoranda. It is typical of his style of sports journalism, and that of his time:

A Base Ball tourney had been held in Chicago on July 4, 1867, in which the Excelsiors of that city and the Forest City Club, of Rockford, had been the leading contestants. The former had defeated the Forest City nine in two games, by the very close scores of 45–41 in one, and 28–25 in another, when the Forest Citys were invited to meet the Nationals at Chicago on July 25, a day which proved the most notable of the tour. The contest took place at Dexter Park, before a vast crowd of spectators, the majority of whom looked to see the Nationals have almost a walk-over. In the game A. G. Spalding was pitcher and Ross Barnes shortstop for the Forest City nine; these two afterwards becoming famous as star players of the Boston professional team of the early seventies. Williams was pitcher for the Nationals and Frank Norton catcher. The Nationals took the lead in the first innings by 3 to 2; but in the next two innings they added but five runs to their score, while the Forest Citys added thirteen to theirs, thereby taking the lead by a score of fifteen to eight, to the great surprise of the crowd and the delight of the Rockfords. The Nationals tried hard to recover the lost ground. The final result, however, was the success of the Forest Citys by a score of 29 to 23 in a nine innings game, twice interrupted by rain.

== Later life ==
Late in life, Chadwick continued editing the Spalding Base Ball Guides and producing a column for the Brooklyn Daily Eagle. In late 1905, he wrote the editor of The New York Times to propose widening of the baseball bat to overcome the advantage that pitchers had established in the game. In his letter, Chadwick noted that some cricket experts had advocated for the narrowing of the cricket bat to bring balance to the advantage that belonged to the batter in that game.

In the winter before the 1908 baseball season, Chadwick was struck by an automobile and was bedridden for several weeks. He recovered and attended an exhibition game at the Polo Grounds the week before the season began. He caught a cold while at the game, and the illness worsened when he attended an Opening Day game at Washington Park in Brooklyn.

On April 19, Chadwick was moving furniture from the fourth floor of his apartment to the second floor when he fell unconscious. He was diagnosed with pneumonia and heart failure. He awakened briefly and asked about the game between Brooklyn and New York, but he died the next day. Henry Chadwick is interred at Green-Wood Cemetery in Brooklyn, New York.

== Legacy ==
For his contributions to the game of baseball, he was elected to the Baseball Hall of Fame by the Veterans Committee in 1938. He was inducted in the same ceremony as Alexander Cartwright.

In 2009, the Society for American Baseball Research (SABR) established the Henry Chadwick Award to honor the outstanding contributions of baseball researchers. Bill James and John Thorn are among the award's recipients.

A collection of historical baseball items, which featured a letter written by Chadwick on the origins of baseball, sold at auction in 2004 for $310,500.

Chadwick was inducted to the Suffolk Sports Hall of Fame during 2020.

Chadwick, through the Spalding Athletic Library collection, added "The Ancient History of Base Ball" in 1867 and "Technical Terms of Base Ball" in 1897.

== Henry Chadwick Award winners ==
2025

- Rob Fitts
- Gary Gillette
- Richard Malatzky

2024

- Larry Gerlach
- Leslie Heaphy
- Sarah Langs

2023

- Steve Gietschier
- Mark Rucker
- Robert Whiting

2022

- James E. Brunson III
- Jane Leavy
- Daniel Okrent

2021

- Gary Ashwill
- Alan Nathan
- Robert W. Peterson

2020

- Michael Haupert
- Thomas Shea
- Tom Tango

2019

- Leonard Koppett
- Rob Neyer
- Allan Roth

2018

- Jefferson Burdick
- Bob McConnell
- Tom Shieber
- Andrew Zimbalist

2017

- Peter C. Bjarkman
- Dan Levitt
- Larry McCray
- Lyle Spatz

2016

- John Dewan
- Larry Lester
- Norman Macht
- Tom Ruane

2015

- David Block
- Dick Cramer
- Bill Deane
- Jerry Malloy
- David Nemec

2014

- Mark Armour
- Ernie Lanigan
- Marc Okkonen
- Cory Schwartz
- John C. Tattersall

2013

- Bill Carle
- Paul Dickson
- Fred Lieb
- Francis C. Richter
- John Thorn

2012

- Robert Creamer
- Tom Heitz
- F.C. Lane
- Ray Nemec
- David W. Smith

2011

- Charles Alexander
- Sean Forman
- John Holway
- Cliff Kachline
- J. G. Taylor Spink

2010

- Lee Allen
- Bob Davids
- Bill James
- Peter Morris
- David Neft
- Pete Palmer
- Lawrence Ritter
- Harold Seymour and Dorothy Seymour Mills
- Jules Tygiel

== Bibliography ==
- Tygiel, Jules. Past Time.
- Schwarz, Alan (2004). The Numbers Game: Baseball's Lifelong Fascination With Statistics. New York: Thomas Dunne Books.
- Schiff, Andrew (2008). "The Father of Baseball": A Biography of Henry Chadwick. Jefferson, North Carolina: McFarland.
