= Harold Seymour =

American baseball historian (1910–1992)

- Born: June 10, 1910; New York City, U.S.
- Died: September 26, 1992 (aged 82); Keene, New Hampshire, U.S.
- Education: Drew University (B.A.); Cornell University (M.A., Ph.D.)
- Occupations: Baseball historian; History professor
- Spouse: Dorothy Zander (m. 1949)
- Writing career
- Notable work: Baseball trilogy
- Website: drharoldseymour.com

Harold Seymour (June 10, 1910 – September 26, 1992) was an American baseball historian and academic who is best known as the co-author of the baseball history trilogy: Baseball: The Early Years, Baseball: The Golden Age, Baseball: The People's Game. Though Seymour was initially credited as the sole author of the highly acclaimed trilogy, his wife Dorothy Seymour Mills was the one who did much of the extensive research and writing for the books.

The Seymour Medal, awarded annually by the Society for American Baseball Research to the best baseball book, is named after Dorothy and Harold Seymour.

== Early life ==
Born in Manhattan, Seymour grew up in Brooklyn where his career in baseball began as bat boy for the Brooklyn Dodgers. He played baseball and was captain of the team while at Drew University. At Cornell University, he did his master's degree and Ph.D. in American history with his dissertation entitled The Rise of Major League Baseball to 1891.

== Marriage and work ==
Seymour met his second wife Dorothy Zander while he was a history professor at Fenn College and she was student. Zander was majoring in English and was involved in the school's literary magazine. Despite their age difference, the two hit it off and got married in 1949, the day after his divorce from his first wife was finalized.

As he began writing the first book in what became a trilogy, Seymour found that his wife's work was indispensable to him. She did majority of the research, organized material, and structured the notes for the first and second volumes of the work. By the time of the third volume, Seymour's health had deteriorated significantly and Dorothy wrote most of the third book by herself. However, during Harold's lifetime, Dorothy did not get any credit for her contributions.

=== Controversy ===
After Seymour's death, Dorothy Seymour began to discuss and write about her contributions to the Baseball trilogy. Her claims were verified by Steve Gietschier, the chief researcher for The Sporting News, who said, "They were credible — more than credible. The Seymour note cards — a good number of them are in what I perceived to be in a woman’s handwriting. At least half. They clearly worked together. I think it was a very complex situation."

In 2010, however, the Society for American Baseball Research (SABR) announced that the Henry Chadwick Award for lifetime achievement was going to only be award to Harold even though, by then, Dorothy's contributions had been public knowledge. After backlash from female members of the organization, SABR decided to jointly award the pair.

Dorothy, who had remarried after soon after Harold's death, later said of her role in his work: "Everyone assumed that he had done all that work by himself — that's what he wanted them to assume, but we were equal partners. All these things were done jointly. He just couldn't share credit. And I didn't say anything at the time, because at the time, wives just didn't do that."

In 2011, Oxford University Press co-credited Seymour Mills as the co-author of the trilogy, alongside her husband, finally acknowledging her contributions to baseball, with her name coming first on the third book.

== Death ==
Towards the end of his life, Seymour suffered from Alzheimer's disease and he was placed in a nursing home in Keene, New Hampshire, three months before his death. At the time, he was working as a consultant on Ken Burns' documentary series Baseball.

== Works ==
- Baseball: The Early Years (1960), Oxford University Press, with Dorothy Seymour Mills
- Baseball: The Golden Age (1971), Oxford University Press, with Dorothy Seymour Mills
- Baseball: The People's Game (1990), Oxford University Press, with Dorothy Seymour Mills ISBN 9780195038903
