= Alfred Henry Spink =

Alfred Henry Spink (August 24, 1854 – May 27, 1928) was a Canadian-born American baseball writer and club organizer based mainly in St. Louis, Missouri. In 1886, he established a weekly newspaper, The Sporting News (TSN), that emerged from World War I as the only national baseball newspaper or magazine.

== Biography ==
Born in the city of Quebec, Canada, Al Spink and his two brothers learned baseball's English cousin, cricket. The family of ten moved to Chicago after the American Civil War and the boys moved to baseball, whose boom was continental in scope. In 1869 or 1870, the Spinks founded the amateur Mutual club on the West Side, named after the professional Mutuals of New York. Probably there were dozens of amateur clubs in Chicago beside the professional White Stockings.

Older brother Billy (William C.) became sporting editor of the St. Louis Globe-Democrat and persuaded Al to move to that city in 1875, where he was soon covering baseball for the Missouri, later St. Louis Republican. The city's first fully professional baseball team, the original St. Louis Brown Stockings were then in operation, contesting the championship of the U.S. in the National Association and then the National League.

Not long after the Browns went out of business in December 1877, the Spink brothers began thinking about how to restore professional baseball in their city. Unfortunately, spectator interest in the game had been damaged by the scandal that persuaded the Browns to drop out, and they struggled to organize a team of former pros playing cooperatively.

Al Spink helped turn the trick in 1881, establishing the Sportsman's Park and Club Association with Chris von der Ahe, whose first work was to acquire and renovate the old Grand Avenue ballpark (as Sportsman's Park). Spink organized a new Brown Stockings team and booked games with other western teams, especially one organized by Cincinnati baseball writer O.P. Caylor and billed as the Cincinnati Red Stockings. The success of independent commercial baseball in 1881, especially in St. Louis, inspired organization of the American Association league for 1882, with Sportsman's Park and Club its member from St. Louis. The writers Spink and Caylor remained influential although the clubs were owned by men of "greater substance".

Al Spink founded The Sporting News in March 1886. Each number was 17 by 22 inches, eight pages, price five cents (Cooper 1996). The leading baseball newspapers were then based in the East, the weeklies Clipper and Sporting Life in New York and Philadelphia. By World War I, TSN would be the only national baseball newspaper. Al Spink had long turned it over to his younger brother Charles, hiring Charles as business manager in the 1880s, selling his stock in 1894, and finally departing from writing and editorial work in 1899 (Cooper 1996).

His nephew, J. G. Taylor Spink, took over The Sporting News in 1914.

Some time after leaving TSN, Al moved to Chicago where he would eventually write for the Evening Post. In 1910, revised in 1911, he published one of the first baseball histories, The National Game. One section organized by city is full of detail on early amateur and independent organizations and players, including 20 pages for his adopted city, "The Game in St. Louis". Another section consists of short entries on more than one hundred baseball writers with dozens of portrait photos. The sections on players organized by fielding position are not unique, but they remain a treasure trove because Spink did not focus exclusively on major league players or major league spans of careers.

Spink died 1928 in Oak Park, Illinois, almost 74 years old. He was the uncle of sportswriter Ernest J. Lanigan, who compiled the first encyclopedia of baseball, The Baseball Cyclopedia.
