= Society for American Baseball Research =

American baseball research organization

- Abbreviation: SABR
- Formation: August 10, 1971; 55 years ago
- Founder: Bob Davids
- Founded at: Cooperstown, New York, U.S.
- Headquarters: 555 N Central Ave #416; Phoenix, Arizona, U.S.
- Field: Baseball research
- Members: 7,580 (2025)
- CEO: Scott Bush
- President: Daniel R. Levitt
- Website: sabr.org

The Society for American Baseball Research (SABR) is a membership organization dedicated to fostering the research and dissemination of the history and statistical record of baseball. The organization was founded in Cooperstown, New York, on August 10, 1971, at a meeting of 16 "statistorians" coordinated by sportswriter Bob Davids. The organization now reports a membership of over 7,500 and is based in Phoenix, Arizona.

== Membership ==
While the acronym "SABR" was used to coin the word sabermetrics (for the use of sophisticated mathematical tools to analyze baseball), the Society is about much more than statistics. Well-known figures in the baseball world such as Bob Costas, Keith Olbermann, Craig R. Wright, and Rollie Hemond are members, along with highly regarded "sabermetricians" such as Bill James and Rob Neyer.

Among Major League Baseball players, Jeff Bajenaru was believed to have been (until 2006) the only active player with a SABR membership; Elden Auker, Larry Dierker, and Andy Seminick also have been involved.

Prominent SABR members include:

- Bob Davids (1926–2002), founder
- Bob McConnell (1925–2012), Home Run Log
- Bill James (born 1949), analyst, writer
- David Lander (1947–2020), actor (Laverne & Shirley), baseball scout
- Larry Lester (born 1949), Negro Leagues Committee
- Stan Musial (1920–2013), Hall of Famer for the St. Louis Cardinals
- David Neft (born 1937), writer, historian, encyclopedist
- David Nemec (born 1938), prolific writer
- Rob Neyer (born 1965), analyst, journalist
- Pete Palmer (born 1938), analyst, encyclopedist
- Dave Smith (born 1948), analyst, Retrosheet founder
- John Thorn (born 1947), historian, encyclopedist
- Robert L. Tiemann, historian
- Monte Irvin (1919–2016), Hall of Famer and former Negro Leagues star
- David W. Vincent (1949–2017), Home Run Log (deceased)
- Larry Dierker (born 1946), former Major League All-Star pitcher
- Ted Williams (1918–2002), Hall of Famer for the Boston Red Sox

== Activities ==
Only a minority of members pursue "number crunching" research. Rather, the SABR community is organized both by interest and geography:

- Research Committees study a particular issue
- Regional Chapters link members by proximity. The latter are frequently named after baseball personalities relevant to their region.

SABR members keep in touch through online directories and electronic mailing lists set up through the SABR headquarters. The headquarters also maintains a number of research tools on its website, including a lending library, home run and triple play logs, and course syllabi related to the game.

SABR holds annual conventions in a different city each year. The conference generally includes panel discussions, research presentations, city-specific tourism, a ballgame, and an awards banquet. The 2017 convention in New York City, set the attendance record with 806 registered attendees out of approximately 7,000 SABR members. The organization also hosts an annual baseball analytics conference in Phoenix and a Negro Leagues conference, which is held in a different location each year.

=== Projects and collections ===
- Biography Project, with members authoring well-researched and engaging biographies of a growing list of former big league ballplayers and other notable contributors to the game.
- Games Project, where members research, write, and publish accounts of the major league regular season, postseason, and All-Star Games, including Negro Leagues games, along with other games of historical significance such as in the minor leagues or international or exhibition contests.
- Oral History Collection, a collection of interviews conducted with ballplayers, executives, scouts, authors, writers, broadcasters, and other figures of historical baseball significance.
- SABR-Rucker Archive, an extensive collection of baseball photographs which contain nearly 80,000 images dating from the 19th century to modern-day baseball.

== Publications ==
The Baseball Research Journal (BRJ) is SABR's flagship publication since 1972 for members to publish and share their research with like-minded students of baseball. The National Pastime is an annual, published from 1982 to 2008 as The National Pastime: A Review of Baseball History, when it was intended as a more literary outlet than the stats oriented BRJ; since 2009 it is a convention-focused journal, with articles about the geographic region where the convention is taking place that year. Other Society publications are an increasing variety of books (since 1976) and ebooks (since 2011); 8–10 new e-books published annually are all free to members.

== Awards ==
SABR annual awards include:

- Bob Davids Award: for exceptional SABR members who have made contributions to SABR and baseball that reflect ingenuity, integrity, and self-sacrifice. It is SABR's highest honor, and was established in 1985.
- Henry Chadwick Award: for baseball researchers—historians, statisticians, annalists, and archivists.
- Seymour Medal: best book of baseball history or biography published during the preceding calendar year.
- McFarland-SABR Baseball Research Award: for authors of the best articles on baseball history or biography completed during the preceding calendar year (published or unpublished).
- Sporting News-SABR Baseball Research Award: for projects which do not fit the criteria for The Seymour Medal or the McFarland-SABR Award.
- Jerry Malloy Book Prize: best book-length nonfiction manuscript submitted by a member of SABR.
- Doug Pappas Research Award: best oral research presentation at the Annual Convention.
- Lee Allen Award: for the best baseball research project at the annual National History Day competition.
- Jack Kavanagh Memorial Youth Baseball Research Award: research paper by a researcher in grades 6–8 (middle school category), grades 9–12 (high school category), or undergraduates 22 and under (College Category).
- Dorothy Seymour Mills Lifetime Achievement Award: awarded to any person with a sustained involvement in women's baseball or any woman with a longtime involvement in baseball in any fashion — player, umpire, writer, executive, team owner, scout, etc.

In 2013, SABR began collaborating with Rawlings on the Gold Glove Award. Rawlings changed the voting process to incorporate SABR Defensive Index, a sabermetric component provided by SABR, which accounts for approximately 25 percent of the vote for the defensive award.

== Research committees ==
- Asian Baseball
- Ballparks
- Baseball and the Arts
- Baseball and the Media
- Baseball Card History and Influence
- Baseball Index Project
- Baseball Records
- Biographical Research
- BioProject
- Black Sox Scandal
- Business of Baseball
- Collegiate Baseball
- Concessions
- Deadball Era (1901–1919)
- Educational Resources
- Games and Simulation
- Games Project
- Latino Baseball
- Minor Leagues
- Negro Leagues
- 19th Century
- Official Scoring
- Oral History
- Origins
- Pictorial History
- Retrosheet (Note: Retrosheet is a research and archives organization independent of SABR which holds its annual meeting in conjunction with the society's annual convention.)
- Science and Baseball
- Scouts
- Spring training
- Statistical Analysis
- Umpires
- Women in Baseball

== Regional chapters ==
SABR has regional chapters located across the mainland United States. There are also a number of international chapters. The majority of chapters are named in honor of a player or person with a close connection to, or after something associated with, the chapter's location. Chapters are displayed here with their headquartered locations and the wider area they serve, if applicable.

- Allan Roth – Los Angeles (Greater Los Angeles)
- Babe Ruth – Baltimore
- Bob Broeg – St. Louis
- Bob Davids – Washington, D.C. (Chesapeake Bay)
- Boston – Boston (Eastern New England)
- Buck O'Neil – Tallahassee, Florida (North Florida)
- Burick–Collett–McCoy – Dayton, Ohio
- Carolina – Durham, North Carolina (North Carolina)
- Casey Stengel – New York City
- Central Florida – Orlando, Florida (Central Florida)
- Central Illinois – Bloomington–Normal (Central Illinois)
- Central Virginia – Richmond, Virginia (Central Virginia)
- Charlotte – Charlotte, North Carolina (North Carolina)
- Choo Choo – Chattanooga, Tennessee
- Cliff Kachline – Cooperstown, New York (Central New York)
- Clyde Sukeforth – Concord, New Hampshire (New Hampshire and Maine)
- Col. Abner Doubleday/Judge Howard Green – San Angelo, Texas (West Texas)
- Connie Mack–Dick Allen – Philadelphia
- Cool Papa Bell – Starkville, Mississippi (Mississippi)
- Dusty Baker – Sacramento, California (Northern California)
- East Tennessee – Knoxville, Tennessee
- Elysian Fields – Jersey City, New Jersey (Northern New Jersey)
- Emil Rothe – Chicago (Chicagoland)
- Ernie Banks–Bobby Bragan – Dallas (Dallas-Fort Worth)
- Field of Dreams – Des Moines, Iowa (Iowa)
- Forbes Field – Pittsburgh
- Gardner–Waterman – Burlington, Vermont (Vermont)
- Goose Goslin – Cherry Hill, New Jersey (South Jersey)
- Grantland Rice–Fred Russell – Nashville, Tennessee (Tennessee)
- Halsey Hall – Minneapolis (Minnesota)
- Hampton Roads Bud Metheny – Norfolk, Virginia (Virginia Eastern Shore)
- Hank Gowdy – Columbus, Ohio (Central Ohio)
- Hoyt–Allen – Cincinnati
- Jack Graney – Cleveland
- Ken Keltner – Milwaukee (Wisconsin)
- Lajoie–Start – Providence, Rhode Island (Southern New England)
- Larry Dierker – Houston
- Larry Doby – Aiken, South Carolina (South Carolina)
- Lefty O'Doul – San Francisco (Bay Area)
- Lou Criger – South Bend, Indiana (Michiana)
- Luke Easter – Rochester, New York (Western New York)
- Maddux Brothers (Note: Named after Greg and Mike Maddux.) – Las Vegas (Nevada)
- Magnolia – Atlanta
- Mathewson–Plank – Harrisburg, Pennsylvania (Central Pennsylvania)
- Monarchs – Kansas City, Missouri
- Kekionga – Fort Wayne, Indiana
- Northwest – Seattle (Pacific Northwest)
- Northwest Ohio – Toledo, Ohio
- Oklahoma – Oklahoma City (Central Oklahoma)
- Orlando Cepeda – San Juan, Puerto Rico (Puerto Rico)
- Oscar Charleston – Indianapolis
- Pee Wee Reese – Louisville, Kentucky (Kentucky)
- Pop Lloyd – Jacksonville, Florida (Northeast Florida)
- Rabbit Maranville – Springfield, Massachusetts (Western Massachusetts)
- Ralph Kiner – New York City (Long Island)
- Rickwood Field – Birmingham, Alabama (Alabama)
- Rio Grande – Albuquerque, New Mexico (New Mexico)
- Robinson–Kell – Little Rock, Arkansas (Arkansas)
- Rocky Mountain – Denver (Greater Colorado)
- Rogers Hornsby – Austin, Texas (Austin–San Antonio)
- Roland Hemond – Phoenix, Arizona (Arizona)
- Schott–Pelican – New Orleans (Louisiana)
- Sebring–Stovey – Williamsport, Pennsylvania (North Central Pennsylvania)
- Seymour–Mills – Naples, Florida (Southwest Florida)
- Smoky Joe Wood – Hartford, Connecticut (Connecticut)
- South Florida – Miami (South Florida)
- Southern Michigan – Detroit (Southern Michigan)
- Sweet Lou Johnson – Lexington, Kentucky (Kentucky)
- Tampa Bay Roush–Lopez – St. Petersburg, Florida (Tampa Bay)
- Ted Williams – San Diego (Mexicali (Note: According to the chapter's description, the San Diego and Tijuana–Mexicali areas.))
- Wahoo Sam Crawford – Omaha, Nebraska (Nebraska)

=== International chapters ===
- Bert Blyleven – Europe
- Bobby Thomson – London (Great Britain)
- China – China
- Luis Castro – Maracaibo (Latin America)
- Quebec – Montreal (Greater Montreal)
- Frank Shaughnessy – Ottawa (Eastern Ontario)
- Juan Marichal – Santo Domingo (Dominican Republic)
- Korea – Seoul (South Korea)
- Ed Abbaticchio – Sorrento (Italy)
- Joe Quinn – Sydney (Australia)
- Taiwan – Taiwan
- Tokyo – Japan
- Hanlan's Point – Toronto (Southern Ontario)

== Past convention sites and keynote speakers ==
SABR holds an annual convention in different locations around North America.

- 1971 Cooperstown, New York; none
- 1972 Washington, D.C.; Chuck Hinton
- 1973 Chicago, Illinois; Bob Elson and Dave Malarcher
- 1974 Philadelphia, Pennsylvania; Fred Lieb, Gene Kelly, and Ted Page
- 1975 Boston, Massachusetts; Joe Dugan
- 1976 Chicago, Illinois; Lew Fonseca
- 1977 Columbus, Ohio; Johnny Bucha
- 1978 Paramus, New Jersey; Tony Lupien
- 1979 St. Louis, Missouri; Mike Shannon
- 1980 Los Angeles, California; Roy Smalley
- 1981 Toronto, Ontario; none
- 1982 Baltimore, Maryland; Sparky Anderson
- 1983 Milwaukee, Wisconsin; Hal Goodenough
- 1984 Providence, Rhode Island; Lou Gorman
- 1985 Oakland, California; Roy Eisenhardt
- 1986 Chicago, Illinois; Bill Gleason
- 1987 Washington, D.C.; John Steadman
- 1988 Minneapolis, Minnesota; Andy MacPhail
- 1989 Albany, New York; Bobby Brown
- 1990 Cleveland, Ohio; Sam McDowell
- 1991 New York City; Mel Allen
- 1992 St. Louis, Missouri; Bing Devine
- 1993 San Diego, California; Dick Williams
- 1994 Arlington, Texas; Robin Roberts
- 1995 Pittsburgh, Pennsylvania; Chuck Tanner
- 1996 Kansas City, Missouri; Don Fehr
- 1997 Louisville, Kentucky; Jim Bunning
- 1998 San Mateo, California; Bill Rigney
- 1999 Scottsdale, Arizona; Tommy Henrich
- 2000 West Palm Beach, Florida; Elden Auker
- 2001 Milwaukee, Wisconsin; Bud Selig
- 2002 Boston, Massachusetts; Dom DiMaggio and Johnny Pesky
- 2003 Denver, Colorado; Jim Evans
- 2004 Cincinnati, Ohio; Marvin Miller
- 2005 Toronto, Ontario; Paul Godfrey
- 2006 Seattle, Washington; Jim Bouton
- 2007 St. Louis, Missouri; Joe Garagiola
- 2008 Cleveland, Ohio; Ron Shapiro
- 2009 Washington, D.C.; Josh Alkin (MLB lobbyist)
- 2010 Atlanta, Georgia; John Schuerholz
- 2011 Long Beach, California; Scott Boras
- 2012 Minneapolis, Minnesota; John Thorn
- 2013 Philadelphia, Pennsylvania; Larry Bowa
- 2014 Houston, Texas; Larry Dierker
- 2015 Chicago, Illinois; Ernie Banks/Minnie Miñoso tribute
- 2016 Miami, Florida; ballpark session with Barry Bonds, Don Mattingly, Andre Dawson, and Tony Perez
- 2017 New York City; ballpark session with Sandy Alderson, Tom Goodwin, Wayne Randazzo, Steve Gelbs, and Josh Lewin
- 2018 Pittsburgh, Pennsylvania; ballpark session with Clint Hurdle, Neal Huntington, Dan Fox, Joe Block, and Thomas E. Kennedy
- 2019 San Diego, California with Steve Garvey, Janet Marie Smith, John Thorn (baseball historian), Randy Jones (baseball), Kurt Bevacqua, Justine Siegal
- 2022 Baltimore, Maryland with Tim Kurkjian and Boog Powell
- 2023 Chicago, Illinois with Jason Benetti
- 2024 Minneapolis, Minnesota with Rod Carew, Tony Oliva, Jim Kaat, Bert Blyleven
- 2025 Dallas–Fort Worth, Texas with Elvis Andrus, Bruce Bochy, Donald Fehr, Tom Grieve, Charlie Hough, Ferguson Jenkins, Ivan Rodriguez and Steve Rogers (baseball)
- 2026 Cleveland, Ohio with Tom Hamilton (sportscaster), Sandy Alomar, Jr., Carlos Baerga, Mike Hargrove, Kenny Lofton and Charles Nagy

== Former Presidents ==
- Bob Davids (1971-72, 75-76, 82-84)
- Ron Menchine (1972-73)
- Robert Allen (1973-74)
- David Voigt (1974-75)
- Eugene Murdock (1976-78)
- Cliff Kachline (1978-80)
- Kit Crissey (1980-82)
- Cappy Gagnon (1984-86)
- Gene Sunnen (1986-89)
- Rich Topp (1989-91)
- Jack Kavanagh (acting, July-December 1991)
- Lloyd Johnson (1991-93)
- David Pietrusza (1993-97)
- Larry Gerlach (1997-99)
- Jim Riley (1999-2001)
- Claudia Perry (2001-2003)
- Dick Beverage (2003-2009)
- Andy McCue (2009-2011)
- Vince Gennaro (2011-19)
- Mark Armour (2019-25)
- Dan Evans (2025)
- Daniel R. Levitt (2025-present)

== See also ==
- Professional Football Researchers Association
