= J. G. Taylor Spink =

American publisher and sportswriter (1888–1962)

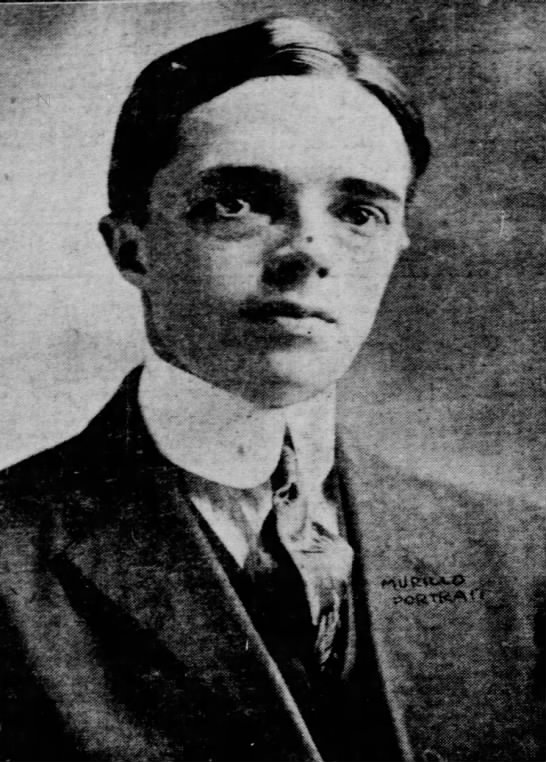
- Spink in 1911
- Born: John George Taylor Spink; November 6, 1888; St. Louis, Missouri, U.S.
- Died: December 7, 1962 (aged 74); Clayton, Missouri, U.S.
- Resting place: Bellefontaine Cemetery
- Occupation: Publisher
- Known for: The Sporting News; J. G. Taylor Spink Award

John George Taylor Spink (November 6, 1888 – December 7, 1962) was the publisher of The Sporting News from 1914 until his death in 1962. He inherited the weekly American baseball newspaper from his father Charles Spink, younger brother of its founder Alfred H. Spink. In 1962, the Baseball Writers' Association of America established an annual J. G. Taylor Spink Award and named him the first recipient; Spink's name was removed from the award in February 2021 due to his history of supporting segregated baseball.

== Biography ==
Spink was born on November 6, 1888, in St. Louis, Missouri, the son of Charles and Marie (née Taylor) Spink. Charles had acquired The Sporting News from its founder, his brother Alfred H. Spink. In an interview with Sports Illustrated, Gerald Holland described Spink's mother as "a great character in her own right". In 1913, Spink was an official scorer for the World Series between the Philadelphia Athletics and the New York Giants.

Taylor Spink is first-class. Everything he does is first-class. He travels first-class, he works first-class. He nightclubs first-class and he tips first-class. His paper is first-class. He demands the best and he gets it.

— Spink on himself

Taylor Spink inherited The Sporting News when his father died in 1914; he would run The Sporting News for nearly a half-century, until his own death. Author Richard Peterson credits his leadership as a reason why the paper became "the Bible of baseball". During his tenure, The Sporting News published its first Baseball Register in 1940. Spink was known for ruling the paper with "an iron will and an iron fist", working every day of the week and making phone calls at any time of day, often so loudly that "he really didn't need a telephone."

On the issue of racial integration in baseball, Spink wrote an editorial titled "No Good From Raising Race Issue", published in August 1942, which read in part: "There is no law against Negroes playing with white teams, or whites with colored clubs, but neither has invited the other for the obvious reason they prefer to draw their talent from their own ranks, and because the leaders of both groups know their crowd psychology and do not care to run the risk of damaging their own game." In 1947, Spink published his biography of Kenesaw Mountain Landis, the first Commissioner of Baseball, titled Judge Landis and 25 Years of Baseball.

Spink died on December 7, 1962, at his home in Clayton, Missouri, and is buried in a mausoleum at Bellefontaine Cemetery. Upon his death, The Sporting News passed to his son, C. C. Johnson Spink.

=== Legacy ===
In 1962, the Baseball Writers' Association of America (BBWAA) inaugurated an annual award "for meritorious contributions to baseball writing"; the BBWAA named it the J. G. Taylor Spink Award and honored Spink as the first recipient. Recipients of the award are recognized at annual National Baseball Hall of Fame ceremonies. In February 2021, the BBWAA voted to remove his name from the award, (Note: The award was renamed as the BBWAA Career Excellence Award.) "due to Spink’s troubled history in supporting segregated baseball."

In 1969, Spink was inducted into the National Sportscasters and Sportswriters Association Hall of Fame. As of 1970, the Topps Minor League Player of the Year Award was also named in honor of Spink. Circa 1974, Spink's son published a collection of stories about his father, titled Taylor Spink... The Legend and The Man. A third award bearing Spink's name, dating to at least the early 1960s, recognizes a player as "St. Louis baseball man of the year"; winners have included Willie McGee for the 1985 season, and Jack Flaherty for the 2019 season.
