= List of Sun Microsystems employees =

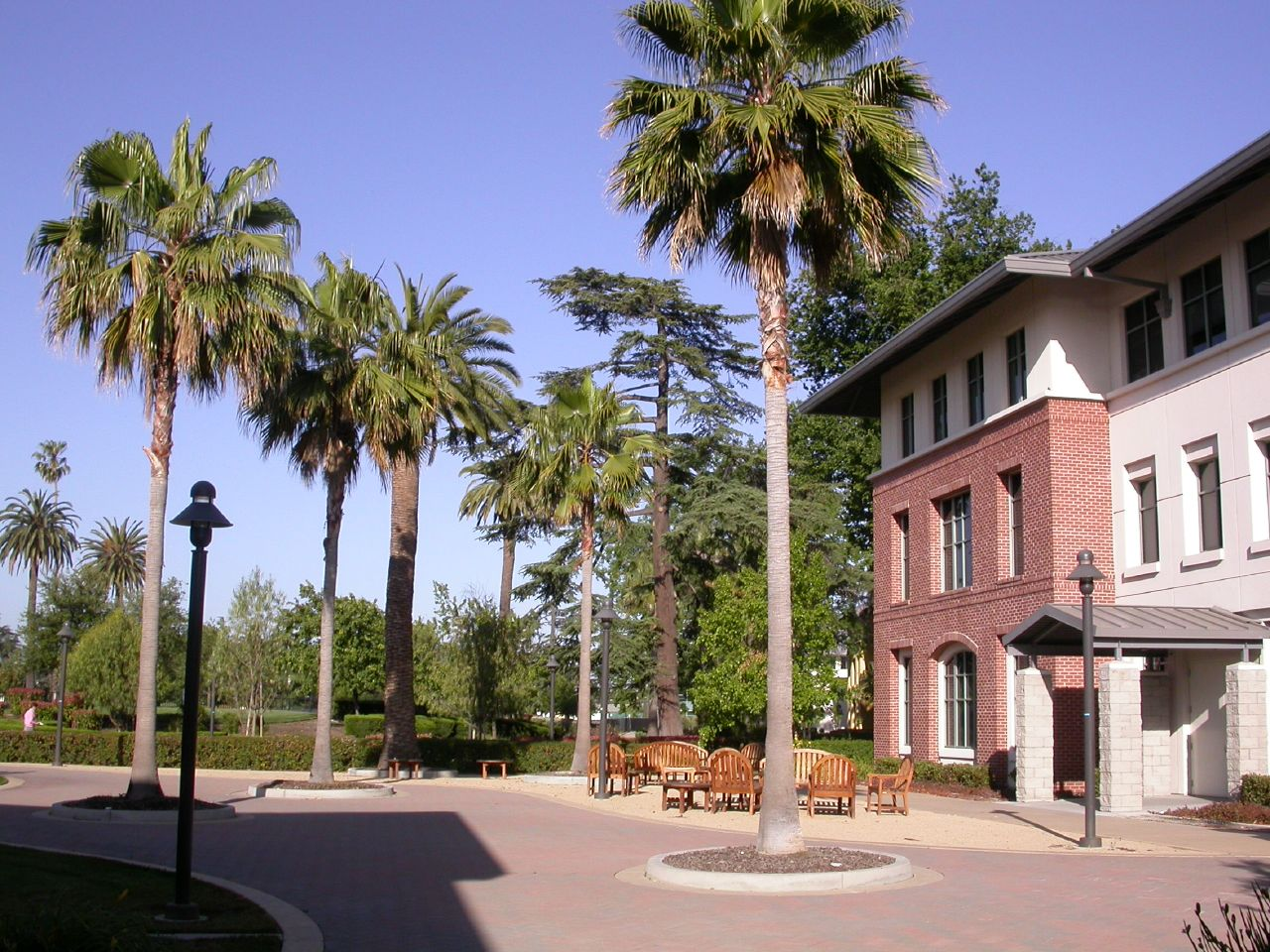
A courtyard at the Sun main campus in Santa Clara, California

Sun Microsystems, from its inception in 1982 to its acquisition by Oracle Corporation in 2010, became known for being "something of a farm system for Silicon Valley." It had a number of employees credited with notable achievements before, during or after their tenure there.

== A ==
- Brian Aker, MySQL Director of Technology
- Ken Arnold, Sun Microsystems Laboratories, co-author of The Java Programming Language
- Valerie Aurora, ZFS programmer

== B ==
- Carol Bartz, head of SunFed, Sun service and worldwide operations; Autodesk CEO, Yahoo! CEO
- Andy Bechtolsheim, Sun co-founder, systems designer and Silicon Valley investor
- Joshua Bloch, author of Effective Java
- Frederick Bloom, Sun Micro System's Senior Java Architect, Core J2EE Patterns (Reference implementation Architect, Lead Developer, PMd.
- Jon Bosak, chair of the original XML working group
- Jeff Bonwick, slab-allocator, vmem and ZFS
- Steve Bourne, creator of the Bourne shell
- Tim Bray, Sun Director of Web Technologies
- David J. Brown, SUN workstation at Stanford; Solaris at Sun
- Paul Buchheit, engineer at Sun from May 1997 to August 1997; Creator of Gmail

== C ==
- Bryan Cantrill, of 2005 Technology Review "Top 35 Young Innovators", co-inventor of DTrace
- Alfred Chuang, co-founder of BEA Systems
- Danny Cohen, co-creator of Cohen-Sutherland line clipping algorithms; coined the computer terms "Big Endians" and "Little Endians" (Endianness)
- Bill Coleman, co-founder of BEA Systems
- Danese Cooper, open source specialist

== D ==
- L. Peter Deutsch, founder of Aladdin Enterprises and creator of Ghostscript
- Whitfield Diffie, Chief Security Officer, co-inventor of public-key cryptography
- Robert Drost, one of Technology Review's 2004 "Top 100 Young Innovators"

== F ==
- Dan Farmer, computer security researcher
- Marc Fleury, creator of the JBoss application server
- Ned Freed, email systems researcher, co-author of several MIME RFCs

== G ==
- Richard P. Gabriel, Lisp expert and founder of Lucid, Inc.
- John Gage, Chief Researcher and former Science Officer; first Sun salesman
- John Gilmore, co-founder of the Electronic Frontier Foundation and Cygnus Solutions
- Gary Ginstling, music industry executive
- James Gosling, co-inventor of Java; creator of NeWS networked extensible window system; author of the first (proprietary) Unix implementation of the Emacs text editor
- Todd Greanier, software architect, author and instructor
- Brendan Gregg, author of DTrace: Dynamic Tracing in Oracle Solaris, Mac OS X and FreeBSD, Systems Performance: Enterprise and the Cloud

== J ==
- Kim Jones, Vice President of Global Education, Government and Health Sciences; CEO of Sun UK from 2007; CEO of Curriki
- Bill Joy, Sun co-founder and architect of BSD Unix; author of the vi text editor

== K ==
- Vinod Khosla, Sun co-founder and Silicon Valley investor

== L ==
- Susan Landau, mathematician and cybersecurity expert
- Adam Leventhal, co-inventor of DTrace
- Peter van der Linden, former manager of kernel group, author of numerous Java and C books

== M ==
- Chris Malachowsky, co-founder of NVIDIA
- Clark Masters EVP, Enterprise Systems and Father of the E10K, President of SunFed
- Craig McClanahan, creator or the Apache Struts framework and architect of Tomcat's servlet container, Catalina
- Scott McNealy, co-founder and Chairman of the Board of Sun; CEO from 1984-2006
- Larry McVoy, CEO of BitMover
- Björn Michaelsen, Director at The Document Foundation
- Mårten Mickos, CEO of MySQL AB from 2001 until Sun acquisition in 2008
- Jim Mitchell, Vice President and Sun Fellow
- Ian Murdock, Vice President of Developer and Community Marketing, founder of Debian

== N ==
- Satya Nadella, CEO of Microsoft
- Patrick Naughton, co-creator of Java
- Jakob Nielsen, web-design usability authority
- Peter Norvig, Director of Research, Google

== O ==
- John Ousterhout, inventor of the Tcl scripting language

== P ==
- Greg Papadopoulos, Executive Vice President and CTO
- Radia Perlman, sometimes known as the "Mother of the Internet"
- Simon Phipps, Chief Open Source Officer
- Kim Polese, prominent dot-com era executive
- Curtis Priem, co-founder of NVIDIA
- Vivek Pande, Senior Java Architect

== R ==
- George Reyes, former CFO of Google, Inc.
- David S. H. Rosenthal, early X Window System developer and original designer of the ICCCM
- Wayne Rosing, project lead for the Apple Lisa; Sun hardware development manager and manager of Sun Labs

== S ==
- Bob Scheifler, leader of X Window System development from 1984 to 1996
- Eric Schmidt, former Sun Chief Technology Officer, chairman and former CEO of Google, Inc., and co-developer of lex
- Jonathan I. Schwartz, former Sun President and CEO
- Ed Scott, co-founder of BEA Systems
- Mike Shapiro, co-inventor of DTrace
- Bob Sproull, computer graphics pioneer
- Guy L. Steele, Jr., co-inventor of the Scheme programming language and member of IEEE standards committees of many programming languages
- Bert Sutherland, manager of Sun Labs, Xerox PARC, BBN Computer Science Division
- Ivan Sutherland, computer graphics pioneer

== T ==
- Bruce Tognazzini, computer usability consultant
- Marc Tremblay, microprocessor architect and Sun's employee with the most awarded patents
- Bud Tribble, former VP of software development at NeXT, VP of software technology at Apple

== W ==
- Jim Waldo, lead architect of Jini
- Michael Widenius, original author of MySQL

== Y ==
- William Yeager, software architect, inventor of the multi-protocol router

== Z ==
- Ed Zander, former president of Sun Microsystems; former CEO of Motorola
