= Reforming American Immigration for Strong Employment Act =

Proposed bill first introduced in the United States Senate

RAISE Act
- Long title: Reforming American Immigration for Strong Employment Act
- Announced in: the 115th United States Congress
- Sponsored by: Tom Cotton and David Perdue

Legislative history
- Introduced in the United States Senate as S. 354 by Tom Cotton (R–AR) on February 13, 2017; Committee consideration by Senate Committee on the Judiciary

The RAISE (Reforming American Immigration for Strong Employment) Act is a bill first introduced in the United States Senate in 2017. Co-sponsored by Republican senators Tom Cotton and David Perdue, the bill sought to reduce levels of legal immigration to the United States by 50% by halving the number of green cards issued. The bill would also dramatically reduce family-based immigration pathways; impose a cap of 50,000 refugee admissions a year; end the visa diversity lottery; and eliminate the current demand-driven model of employment-based immigration and replace it with a points system. The bill received the support of President Donald Trump, who promoted a revised version of the bill in August 2017, and was opposed by Democrats, immigrant rights groups, and some Republicans.

The 2017 bill (in the 115th Congress) did not receive a vote in the Senate. A similar immigration bill supported by then president Trump was defeated in 2018 on a 39–60 vote. In 2019 (during the 116th Congress), Cotton, Perdue, and other Republicans re-introduced the legislation. The bill failed to advance.

== History ==
The bill was co-sponsored by Republican senator Tom Cotton of Arkansas and then-senator David Perdue of Georgia, who introduced the bill to the Senate on February 13, 2017, as S. 354. The bill was referred to the United States Senate Committee on the Judiciary.

On August 2, 2017, Cotton introduced a revised version of the bill, designated S. 1720. That bill was also referred to the Senate Committee on the Judiciary. President Donald Trump, along with Cotton and Perdue, announced it at the White House. Within the Trump White House, Trump advisers Stephen Miller and Steve Bannon promoted and helped shape the bill. The bill did not attract any additional co-sponsors.

The 2017 bill did not receive a vote in the Senate. A separate bill to restrict legal immigration, supported by Trump, Cotton, and Perdue, was defeated in the Senate by a 39–60 vote. In 2019, Cotton, Perdue, and other Republicans re-introduced the RAISE Act legislation.

== Provisions and analysis ==
The bill would cut legal immigration by half, reducing the number of green cards from more than 1 million to about 500,000. The bill would remove the pathway for US citizens to sponsor their parent. It would also remove pathways for siblings and adult children of U.S. citizens and legal permanent residents to apply for permanent lawful residency status in the U.S., limiting the family path to spouses and minor children. The bill would also impose a cap of 50,000 refugee admissions a year and would end the visa diversity lottery.

In promoting the legislation, Trump administration officials contend that the bill would increase economic growth and increase wages. This contention was challenged by economists, who "overwhelmingly predict" that cuts in immigration would have a negative impact on GDP growth. In April 2017, a group of more than 1,400 economists, with views ranging across the political spectrum, sent an open letter to Trump noting the "near universal agreement" on "the broad economic benefit that immigrants to this country bring" and urging him not to seek immigration cuts. The Penn Wharton Budget Model projects that the RAISE Act would increase per-capita GDP by 0.02 percent in the first decade, before falling in the long run by 2040. Cato Institute immigration policy analyst Alex Nowrasteh said that the legislation "would do nothing to boost skilled immigration and it will only increase the proportion of employment-based green cards by cutting other green cards. Saying otherwise is grossly deceptive marketing."

The "only evidence that the administration has cited as justifying its proposals" is the work of economist George Borjas, who has defended the bill, arguing that it "makes sense" and that "low-skill immigration, which would likely suffer the largest cuts in the proposed bill, imposes costs on taxpayers and it imposes costs on low-skill workers already here." Other economists have sharply contested Borjas's conclusions; economist Giovanni Peri stated that "The average American worker is more likely to lose than to gain from immigration restrictions" and "most studies put the negative impact on low-skilled wages closer to zero," and Michael Clemens argues that Borjas's position is based on a study with critical flaws.

== Support and opposition ==
The bill and Trump's support for it was hailed by groups favoring restrictive immigration policies, such as NumbersUSA and the Federation for American Immigration Reform. CNBC journalist John Harwood viewed the bill as an appeal to Trump's anti-immigration base of Republican voters.

The bill is opposed by Democrats as well as some Republicans. Democratic National Committee chairman Tom Perez said that "Trump wants to tear apart communities and punish immigrant families that are making valuable contributions to our economy." Democratic Senator Richard Blumenthal of Connecticut called the bill "nothing but a series of nativist talking points and regurgitated campaign rhetoric that completely fails to move our nation forward toward real reform." Seven of the eight Senators in the bipartisan "Gang of Eight" (four Democrats and four Republicans who co-sponsored an unsuccessful immigration-reform bill in 2013) denounced the bill. Republican Senator Lindsey Graham, for example, a member of the Gang of Eight, said the proposal would be "devastating" to South Carolina's economy. The eighth member of the Gang of Eight, Republican Senator Marco Rubio, said that he had "a big difference of opinion with this bill is that it sets an arbitrary cap on the number of people that are able to come through with a green card."

The Congressional Hispanic Caucus and immigrant rights groups both condemned the legislation. The National Immigration Law Center called the bill "cruel and un-American" and issued a statement saying that it would "devastate families, eliminating the traditional and long-accepted means by which family members such as grandparents, mothers, fathers and siblings are able to reunite with their families who have emigrated to the United States." The technology industry immigration-policy advocacy group FWD.us said the bill, if enacted, "would severely harm the economy and actually depress wages for Americans." The Association of Public and Land-grant Universities and NAFSA: Association of International Educators also oppose the bill, describing it as flawed and a step backward. The Anti-Defamation League also opposed the legislation, calling it "cruel, anti-family and un-American."

The bill was mentioned specifically during U.S. Senator and future Vice President JD Vance's 2022 campaign, with Vance voicing support for the RAISE Act as a model for a merit-based immigration system.

== Full details of the points system ==
In addition to substantially reducing legal immigration to the United States, and dramatically reducing family-based immigration, the bill would also replace the current employment-based U.S. immigration system with a rigid points system, which would mark a departure from the current U.S. demand-driven model of employment-based immigration. Under the legislation, a maximum of 140,000 points-based immigrant visas would be issued per fiscal year, with spouses and minor children of the principal applicant being counted against the 140,000 cap. The green cards allocated for employment based green cards through the point system will not have country caps.

Eighty-five percent of employment-based immigrants adjust to permanent residence from temporary worker or student visas in the U.S., due to the difficulty of finding an employer sponsor abroad and high demand for permanent immigration. The RAISE Act’s point system, which rewards higher-paying jobs, English skills, and U.S. STEM degrees, would favor those already in the U.S. on student, H-1B and O-1 visas. Countries with the most skilled immigrant visa holders (India and China) and the largest student populations in the U.S. (China, India, Canada, South Korea) would dominate the points-based visa system, with English-speaking countries receiving additional advantages.

The revised version of the bill (S. 1720) provided that a person who accrued 30 points under the following allocation scheme would be eligible to submit an application.

Worldwide	Cap of 140,000 for each fiscal year (including spouses and children)	
Point Allocation	Age (10 points maximum)	
Point Allocation	Between 0 and 17	May not submit an application
Point Allocation	Between 18 and 21	6 points
Point Allocation	Between 22 and 25	8 points
Point Allocation	Between 26 and 30	10 points
Point Allocation	Between 31 and 35	8 points
Point Allocation	Between 36 and 40	6 points
Point Allocation	Between 41 and 45	4 points
Point Allocation	Between 46 and 50	2 points
Point Allocation	51 or older	0 points
Point Allocation	Formal education (13 points maximum)	
Point Allocation	U.S. or Foreign High School Degree	1 point
Point Allocation	Foreign bachelor's degree	5 points
Point Allocation	U.S. Bachelor's Degree	6 points
Point Allocation	Foreign master's degree in Science, Technology, Engineering or Mathematics (STEM)	7 points
Point Allocation	U.S. STEM Master's Degree	8 points
Point Allocation	Foreign Professional Degree or Doctoral STEM	10 points
Point Allocation	U.S. Professional Degree or Doctoral STEM	13 points
Point Allocation	English language proficiency (12 points maximum)	
Point Allocation	1st – 5th deciles	0 points
Point Allocation	6th – 7th deciles	6 points
Point Allocation	8th decile	10 points
Point Allocation	9th decile	11 points
Point Allocation	10th decile	12 points
Point Allocation	Extraordinary achievement (40 points maximum)	
Point Allocation	Nobel Laureate or comparable recognition	25 points
Point Allocation	Individual Olympic medal or first place in a comparable international sporting event	15 points
Point Allocation	Job offer/highly compensated employment (13 points maximum)	
Point Allocation	Annual salary offered is at least 150% but less than 200% of the median household income in the state of employment	5 points
Point Allocation	Annual salary offered is at least 200% but less than 300% of the median household income in the state of employment	8 points
Point Allocation	Annual salary offered is at least 300% of the median household income in the state of employment	13 points
Point Allocation	Investment and active management of new enterprise (12 points maximum)	
Point Allocation	Investment of at least $1.35 million but less than $1.8 million in a U.S. New Commercial Enterprise (NCE); maintain the investment for three years and play active role in managing the NCE as primary occupation	6 points
Point Allocation	Investment of at least $1.8 million in a U.S. NCE; maintain the investment for three years and play active role in managing the NCE as primary occupation	12 points
Point Allocation	Valid (pre-existing) offer of admission under family preference category	2 points
