= McClanahan =

- Pronunciation: McClanahan

Origin
- Origin: Ireland-Scotland
- Meaning: derived from Mac Lennacháin, "The son of he who owns mantles," or Mac Gille Onchon, "The son of the servant of Oncho"
- Region of origin: Gaelic

Other names
- Variant forms: MacClannachan, MacClenaghan, M'Clenaghan, McClenaghan, McClanaghan

McClanahan is an Irish surname that is derived from several Anglicized forms of the Gaelic surname Mac Lennacháin or Mac Gille Onchon.

== Etymology ==
The New Dictionary of American Family Names translates Mac Lennacháin as "the son of little Leannach" and Mac Gille Onchon as "the son of the servant of Oncho." Leanach means "possessing mantles". Mac Lennacháin is sometimes written as MacClannachan, with variations including MacClenaghan, McClenaghan, M'Clenaghan. Gille is a Gaelic word meaning "servant", more specifically a professional guide for sportsmen, especially in fishing and deerstalking. Onchu, meaning "Mighty hound", was an Irish warrior who participated in the Irish battle of Cuil Corra in 649 CE.

== Family motto ==
The family motto, as recorded in the McClanahan coat of arms, is "Virtue Is My Honor."

== Notable people ==
- Brent McClanahan (born 1952), American football player
- Craig McClanahan (born 1953), American programmer
- Ed McClanahan, American novelist, essayist, and professor
- Elijah McClanahan (1770–1857), American planter and soldier
- Elizabeth A. McClanahan (born 1959), Justice of the Supreme Court of Virginia
- Jeffrey McClanahan, American novelist
- Kim McClenaghan (born 1974), South African poet and writer
- Meade McClanahan (c.1894–1959), American industrial engineer and businessman
- Pete McClanahan (1906–1987), American pinch hitter in Major League Baseball
- Randy McClanahan (born 1954), American football player
- Rebecca McClanahan (born 1951), Democratic Representative from Missouri
- Rob McClanahan (born 1958), American ice hockey player
- Rue McClanahan (1934–2010), American actress and comedian
- Scott McClanahan, American writer, economist, explorer, and martial artist
- Shane McClanahan (born 1997), American baseball pitcher
- Timothy R. McClanahan (born 1957), American biologist and conservation zoologist
