= Liliana Rojas-Suarez =

Peruvian economist

Academic background
- Education: Western University

Academic work
- Discipline: Financial stability, Financial regulation, Financial crises, International development, Financial Inclusion
- Institutions: Center for Global Development
- Website: Information at IDEAS / RePEc

Liliana Rojas-Suarez is a Peruvian economist, who is currently a Senior Fellow and Director of the Latin American Initiative at the Center for Global Development. She is also Core Faculty for the Program in Economic Policy Management at School of International and Public Affairs, Columbia University and the President of the Latin American Committee on Macroeconomic and Financial Issues (CLAAF). In 2012, Rojas-Suarez was named Economist of the Year by Lima's Chamber of Commerce.

== Early years ==
Rojas-Suarez was born in Lima, Peru. She earned a B.A. in economics at Pontificia Universidad Catolica del Peru (1975), a M.A. in economics at University of Ottawa (1978) and a Ph.D. in economics at Western University (1984).

== Career ==
Liliana Rojas-Suarez is a Peruvian economist, who is currently a Senior Fellow and Director of the Latin American Initiative at the Center for Global Development. She is also Core Faculty for the Program in Economic Policy Management at School of International and Public Affairs, Columbia University and the President of the Latin American Committee on Macroeconomic and Financial Issues (CLAAF). In 2012, Rojas-Suarez was named Economist of the Year by Lima's Chamber of Commerce. Rojas-Suarez has developed extensive empirical research on financial stability and financial crises in Latin America and Emerging Markets, International Development, financial regulation and financial inclusion. During 2010–11, Rojas-Suarez was the President of the International Banking, Economics, and Finance Association (IBEFA). She has previously served as the chief economist for Latin America at Deutsche Bank (1998–2000) and as principal advisor to the chief economist at the Inter-American Development Bank (1994–1998). She spent a decade working for the International Monetary Fund (IMF), where her final position was as Deputy Chief of the Capital Markets and Financial Studies Division. She has also taught at Mexico's Anahuac University, been a visiting fellow at the Peterson Institute for International Economics, and worked as an economic advisor to PEMEX, Mexico's state-owned petroleum company.

== Books and Reports ==
- Financial Regulations for Improving Financial Inclusion, co-chaired with Stijn Claessens, Center for Global Development, March 2016.
- Competitiveness in Central America: The Road to Sustained Growth and Poverty Reduction, with Jose Luis Guasch and Veronica Gonzales, Center for Global Development, 2012.
- Growing Pains in Latin America: An Economic Growth Framework as Applied to Brazil, Colombia, Costa Rica, Mexico and Peru, editor Center for Global Development, 2009.
- Policy Principles for Expanding Financial Access, co-chaired with Stijn Claessens and Patrick Honohan, Center for Global Development, September 2009.
- Los Desafíos del Crecimiento en América Latina: Un Nuevo Enfoque, editor, Center for Global Development and Fondo de Cultura Económica, 2009.
- From Growth to Prosperity: Policy Perspectives for Trinidad and Tobago, ed. with Carlos Elias, Special Publications on Development No. 1 by the Inter-American Development Bank, 2006.
- Barbados: Meeting the Challenge of Competitiveness in the 21st Century, ed. with Desmond Thomas, Special Publications on Development No. 2 by the Inter-American Development Bank, 2006.
- Financing Development: The Power of Regionalism, ed. with Nancy Birdsall, Center for Global Development, September 2004.
- A New Era at the Inter-American Development Bank: Six Recommendations for the New President, Report Leader, [claaf.org Latin American Committee on Macroeconomic and Financial Issues] and Center for Global Development, January 2006.
- Los Seguros de Depósitos en los Países Andinos: Propuestas para un Régimen Común, with G. Arteta, A. Carrasquilla, Gustavo García, Martin Naranjo and Xavier Nogales, Inter-American Development Bank and CAF, November 2001.
- Why so High?: Understanding Interest Rate Spreads in Latin America, ed. With Philip Brock, Inter-American Development Bank, 2000.
- Financial Regulation: Why. How and Where Now?, with Charles Goodhart, Philipp Hartmann, David Llewellyn and Steven Weisbrod, Bank of England, 1998.
- Safe and Sound Financial Systems: What Works for Latin America?, editor, Inter-American Development Bank, 1997.
- Banking Crises in Latin America, ed. with Ricardo Hausmann, Inter-American Development Bank, 1996.
- Volatile Capital Flows: Taming their Impact on Latin America, ed. with Ricardo Hausmann, Inter-American Development Bank, 1996.
- International Capital Markets, Part I. Exchange Rate Management and International Capital Flows, with Morris Goldstein, David Folkerts-Landau, Peter Garber and Michael Spencer, International Monetary Fund, 1993.
