= Economic effects of immigration =

Research suggests that immigration can be beneficial both to the receiving and sending countries. Research, with few exceptions, finds that immigration on average has positive economic effects on the native population, but is mixed as to whether low-skilled immigration adversely affects underprivileged natives. Studies suggest that the elimination of barriers to migration would have profound effects on world GDP, with estimates of gains ranging between 15 and 67 percent for the scenarios in which 37 to 53 percent of the developing countries' workers migrate to the developed countries. (Note: Other studies show a larger change in global GDP, but the 15 to 63 percent range is used to keep it relevant to the percentage of developing countries' workers who migrate to developed countries.)

Some development economists argue that reducing barriers to labor mobility between under-developed, developing and developed countries would be one of the most efficient tools of poverty reduction. Positive net immigration can soften the demographic dilemma in the aging global North.

== Study methodologies ==
David Card's 1990 work – considered a landmark study in the topic – found no effect on native wages or employment rates. It followed the Mariel boatlift, a natural experiment when 125,000 Cubans (Marielitos) came to Miami after a sudden relaxation in emigration rules. It lacked the limitations of previous studies, including that migrants often choose high-wage cities, so increases in wages could simply be a result of the economic success of the city rather than the migrants. But the Marielitos chose Miami simply because it was near Cuba rather than for lucrative wages. Preceding studies were also limited in that firms and natives may respond to migration and its effects by moving to more lucrative areas. However, the six-month period of this migration was too brief for most firms or individuals to leave Miami.

Another natural experiment followed a group of Czech workers who, shortly after the fall of the Berlin wall, were suddenly able to work in Germany though they continued to live in Czechia. It found significant declines in native wages and employment as a result. It is argued migrants must also spend their wages in the employing country in order to stimulate the economy and offset their burden.

== Global ==
According to economists Michael Clemens and Lant Pritchett, "permitting people to move from low-productivity places to high-productivity places appears to be by far the most efficient generalized policy tool, at the margin, for poverty reduction". A successful two-year in situ anti-poverty program, for instance, helps poor people make in a year what is the equivalent of working one day in the developed world. A slight reduction in the barriers to labor mobility between the developing and developed world could do more to reduce poverty in the developing world than any remaining trade liberalization. Studies show that the elimination of barriers to migration could have profound effects on world GDP, with estimates of gains ranging between 67 and 147.3%. Research also finds that migration leads to greater trade in goods and services, and increases in financial flows between the sending and receiving countries.

Greater openness to low-skilled immigration in wealthy countries could drastically reduce global income inequality. According to Branko Milanović, country of residency is by far the most important determinant of global income inequality, which suggests that the reduction in labor barriers could significantly reduce global income inequality.

== State ==
A survey of European economists shows a consensus that freer movement of people to live and work across borders within Europe makes the average European better off, and strong support behind the notion that it has not made low-skilled Europeans worse off. According to David Card, Christian Dustmann, and Ian Preston, "most existing studies of the economic impacts of immigration suggest these impacts are small, and on average benefit the native population". In a survey of the existing literature, Örn B Bodvarsson and Hendrik Van den Berg write, "a comparison of the evidence from all the studies... makes it clear that, with very few exceptions, there is no strong statistical support for the view held by many members of the public, mainly that immigration has an adverse effect on native-born workers in the destination country."

Research also suggests that diversity and immigration have a net positive effect on productivity and economic prosperity. Immigration has also been associated with reductions in offshoring. A study found that the Age of Mass Migration (1850–1920) contributed to "higher incomes, higher productivity, more innovation, and more industrialization" in the short-run and "higher incomes, less poverty, less unemployment, higher rates of urbanization, and greater educational attainment" in the long-run for the United States. Research also shows that migration to Latin America during the Age of Mass Migration had a positive effect on long-run economic development. A 2016 paper by University of Southern Denmark and University of Copenhagen economists found that the 1924 immigration restrictions enacted in the United States impaired the economy.

The view that economic effects on the average native tends to be only small and positive is disputed by some studies, such as a 2023 statistical analysis of historical immigration data in Netherlands which found economic effects with both larger positive and negative net contributions per capita depending on different factors including previous education and income of the immigrant. Effects may vary due to factors like the migrants' age, education, reason for migration, the strength of the economy, and how long ago the migration took place.

Low-skill immigration has been linked to greater income inequality in the native population, but overall immigration was found to account for a relatively small share of the rise of native wage inequality. For example, according to a study, immigration was only responsible for 5% of the increase in wage inequality in the US between 1980 and 2000.

Measuring the national effect of immigration on the change of total GDP or on the change of GDP per capita can have distinct results.

=== Emigrant ===
Research suggests that migration is beneficial both to the receiving and sending countries. According to one study, welfare increases in both types of countries: "welfare impact of observed levels of migration is substantial, at about 5% to 10% for the main receiving countries and about 10% in countries with large incoming remittances". A study of equivalent workers in the United States and 42 developing countries found that "median wage gap for a male, unskilled (9 years of schooling), 35-year-old, urban formal sector worker born and educated in a developing country is P$15,400 per year at purchasing power parity". A 2014 survey of the existing literature on emigration finds that a 10 percent emigrant supply shock would increase wages in the sending country by 2–5.5%.

Remittances increase living standards in the country of origin. Remittances are a large share of the GDP of many developing countries. A study on remittances to Mexico found that remittances lead to a substantial increase in the availability of public services in Mexico, surpassing government spending in some localities.

Research finds that emigration and low migration barriers has net positive effects on human capital formation in the sending countries. This means that there's a "brain gain" instead of a "brain drain" to emigration. Emigration has also been linked to innovation in cases where the migrants return to their home country after developing skills abroad.

One study finds that sending countries benefit indirectly in the long-run on the emigration of skilled workers because those skilled workers are able to innovate more in developed countries, which the sending countries are able to benefit as a positive externality. Greater emigration of skilled workers consequently leads to greater economic growth and welfare improvements in the long-run. The negative effects of high-skill emigration remain largely unfounded. According to economist Michael Clemens, it has not been shown that restrictions on high-skill emigration reduce shortages in the countries of origin.

Research also suggests that emigration, remittances and return migration can have a positive effect on political institutions and democratization in the country of origin. According to Abel Escribà-Folch, Joseph Wright, and Covadonga Meseguer, remittances "provide resources that make political opposition possible, and they decrease government dependency, undermining the patronage strategies underpinning authoritarianism." Research also shows that remittances can lower the risk of civil war in the country of origin.

Research suggests that emigration causes an increase in the wages of those who remain in the country of origin. A 2014 survey of the existing literature on emigration finds that a 10 percent emigrant supply shock would increase wages in the sending country by 2–5.5%. A study of emigration from Poland shows that it led to a slight increase in wages for high- and medium-skilled workers for remaining Poles. A 2013 study finds that emigration from Eastern Europe after the 2004 EU enlargement increased the wages of remaining young workers in the country of origin by 6%, while it had no effect on the wages of old workers. The wages of Lithuanian men increased as a result of post-EU enlargement emigration. Return migration is associated with greater household firm revenues. Emigration leads to boosts in foreign direct investment to their home country.

Some research shows that the remittance effect is not strong enough to make the remaining natives in countries with high emigration flows better off.

=== Fiscal ===
A 2011 literature review of the economic effects of immigration found that the net fiscal effect of migrants varies across studies but that the most credible analyses typically find small and positive fiscal effects on average. According to the authors, "the net social impact of an immigrant over his or her lifetime depends substantially and in predictable ways on the immigrant's age at arrival, education, reason for migration, and similar". According to a 2007 literature review by the Congressional Budget Office, "Over the past two decades, most efforts to estimate the fiscal implications of immigration in the United States have concluded that, in aggregate and over the long term, tax revenues of all types generated by immigrants – both legal and unauthorized – exceed the cost of the services they use." A 2022 study found that the sharp reduction in refugee admissions adversely affected public coffers at all levels of government in the United States.

A 2018 study found that inflows of asylum seekers into Western Europe from 1985 to 2015 had a net positive fiscal effect. Research has shown that EU immigrants made a net positive fiscal contribution to Denmark and the United Kingdom. A 2017 study found that when Romanian and Bulgarian immigrants to the United Kingdom gained permission to acquire welfare benefits in 2014 that it had no discernible effect on the immigrants' use of welfare benefits. A paper by a group of French economists found that over the period 1980–2015, "international migration had a positive impact on the economic and fiscal performance of OECD countries."

A 2023 study in the Netherlands found both large positive and large negative fiscal effects depending on previous education and income of immigrant. Immigration for work and study from most Western and East Asian countries had a positive effect while other types of immigration, especially family and asylum immigration, were at best budget neutral or had a negative effect.

== Individual ==
A survey of leading economists shows a consensus behind the view that high-skilled immigration makes the average American better off. A survey of the same economists also shows support behind the notion that low-skilled immigration makes the average American better off and makes many low-skilled American workers substantially worse off unless they are compensated by others.

Studies show more mixed results for low-skilled natives, but whether the effects are positive or negative, they tend to be small either way. Research indicates immigrants are more likely to work in risky jobs than U.S.-born workers, partly due to differences in average characteristics, such as immigrants' lower English language ability and educational attainment. According to a 2017 survey of the existing economic literature, studies on high-skilled migrants "rarely find adverse wage and employment consequences, and longer time horizons tend to show greater gains".

Competition from immigrants in a particular profession may aggravate underemployment in that profession, but increase wages for other natives; for instance, a 2017 study in Science found that "the influx of foreign-born computer scientists since the early 1990s... increased the size of the US IT sector... benefited consumers via lower prices and more efficient products... raised overall worker incomes by 0.2 to 0.3% but decreased wages of U.S. computer scientists by 2.6 to 5.1%." A 2019 study found that foreign college workers in STEM occupations did not displace native college workers in STEM occupations, but instead had a positive effect on the latter group's wages. A 2021 study similarly found that highly educated immigrants to Switzerland caused wages to increase for highly educated Swiss natives. A 2019 study found that greater immigration led to less off-shoring by firms.

By increasing overall demand, immigrants could push natives out of low-skilled manual labor into better paying occupations. Microeconomic principles of labor, however, entail that increased competition in the labor market generally leads to workers being laid off or their wages being lowered. A 2018 study in the American Economic Review found that the Bracero program (which allowed almost half a million Mexican workers to do seasonal farm labor in the United States) did not have any adverse effect on the labor market outcomes of American-born farm workers. A 2019 study by economic historians found that immigration restrictions implemented in the 1920s had an adverse effect on US-born workers' earnings.

=== Immigrants ===
Research on a migration lottery allowing Tongans to move to New Zealand found that the lottery winners saw a 263% increase in income from migrating (after only one year in New Zealand) relative to the unsuccessful lottery entrants. A longer-term study on the Tongan lottery winners finds that they "continue to earn almost 300 percent more than non-migrants, have better mental health, live in households with more than 250 percent higher expenditure, own more vehicles, and have more durable assets". A conservative estimate of their lifetime gain to migration is NZ$315,000 in net present value terms (approximately US$237,000).

A 2017 study of Mexican immigrant households in the United States found that by virtue of moving to the United States, the households increase their incomes more than fivefold immediately. The study also found that the "average gains accruing to migrants surpass those of even the most successful current programs of economic development."

A 2017 study of European migrant workers in the UK shows that upon accession to the EU, the migrant workers see a substantial positive effect on their earnings. The data indicate that acquiring EU status raises earnings for the workers by giving them the right to freely change jobs.

A 2017 study in the Quarterly Journal of Economics found that immigrants from middle- and low-income countries to the United States increased their wages by a factor of two to three upon migration.

== Refugees ==
A 2017 survey of leading economists found that 34% of economists agreed with the statement "The influx of refugees into Germany beginning in the summer of 2015 will generate net economic benefits for German citizens over the succeeding decade", whereas 38% were uncertain and 6% disagreed. Studies of refugees' effects on native welfare are scant but the existing literature shows mixed results (negative, positive and no significant effects). According to economist Michael Clemens, "when economists have studied past influxes of refugees and migrants they have found the labor market effects, while varied, are very limited, and can in fact be positive." A 2018 study in the Economic Journal found that Vietnamese refugees to the United States had a positive effect on American exports, as exports to Vietnam grew most in US states with larger Vietnamese populations. A 2018 study in the journal Science Advances found that asylum seekers entering Western Europe in the period 1985–2015 had a positive macroeconomic and fiscal effect. A 2019 study found that the mass influx of 1.3 million Syrian refugees to Jordan (total population: 6.6 million) did not have harm the labor market outcomes of native Jordanians. A 2020 study found that Syrian refugees to Turkey improved the productivity of Turkish firms.

A 2017 paper by Evans and Fitzgerald found that refugees to the United States pay "$21,000 more in taxes than they receive in benefits over their first 20 years in the U.S." An internal study by the Department of Health and Human Services under the Trump administration, which was suppressed and not shown to the public, found that refugees to the United States brought in $63 billion more in government revenues than they cost the government. A 2017 paper looking at the long-term effects of refugees on the American labor market over the period 1980–2010 found "that there is no adverse long-run impact of refugees on the U.S. labor market." A 2022 study by economist Michael Clemens found that the sharp reduction in refugee admissions in the United States since 2017 had cost the U.S. economy over $9.1 billion per year and cost public coffers over $2 billion per year.

Refugees integrate more slowly into host countries' labor markets than labor migrants, in part due to the loss and depreciation of human capital and credentials during the asylum procedure. Refugees tend to do worse in economic terms than natives, even when they have the same skills and language proficiencies of natives. For instance, a 2013 study of Germans in West-Germany who had been displaced from Eastern Europe during and after World War II showed that the forced German migrants did far worse economically than their native West-German counterparts decades later. Second-generation forced German migrants also did worse in economic terms than their native counterparts. A study of refugees to the United States found that "refugees that enter the U.S. before age 14 graduate high school and enter college at the same rate as natives. Refugees that enter as older teenagers have lower attainment with much of the difference attributable to language barriers and because many in this group are not accompanied by a parent to the U.S." Refugees that entered the U.S. at ages 18–45, have "much lower levels of education and poorer language skills than natives and outcomes are initially poor with low employment, high welfare use and low earnings." But the authors of the study find that "outcomes improve considerably as refugees age."

A 2017 study found that the 0.5 million Portuguese who returned to Portugal from Mozambique and Angola in the mid-1970s lowered labor productivity and wages. A 2018 paper found that the areas in Greece that took on a larger share of Greek Orthodox refugees from the Greco-Turkish War of 1919–1922 "have today higher earnings, higher levels of household wealth, greater educational attainment, as well as larger financial and manufacturing sectors."

== Illegal ==
Research on the economic effects of illegal immigrants is scant but existing studies suggests that the effects are positive for the native population, and public coffers. A 2015 study shows that "increasing deportation rates and tightening border control weakens low-skilled labor markets, increasing unemployment of native low-skilled workers. Legalization, instead, decreases the unemployment rate of low-skilled natives and increases income per native." Studies show that legalization of illegal immigrants could boost the U.S. economy; a 2013 study found that granting legal status to illegal immigrants could raise their incomes by a quarter (increasing U.S. GDP by approximately $1.4 trillion over a ten-year period), and a 2016 study found that "legalization would increase the economic contribution of the unauthorized population by about 20%, to 3.6% of private-sector GDP." A 2018 National Bureau of Economic Research paper found that illegal immigrants to the United States "generate higher surplus for US firms relative to natives, hence restricting their entry has a depressing effect on job creation and, in turn, on native labor markets."

A 2017 study in the Journal of Public Economics found that more intense immigration enforcement increased the likelihood that US-born children with illegal immigrant parents would live in poverty.

A paper by Spanish economists found that upon legalizing the illegal immigrant population in Spain, the fiscal revenues increased by around €4,189 per newly legalized immigrant. The paper found that the wages of the newly legalized immigrants increased after legalization, some low-skilled natives had worse labor market outcomes and high-skilled natives had improved labor market outcomes.

A 2018 study found no evidence that apprehensions of illegal immigrants in districts in the United States improved the labor market outcomes for American natives. A 2020 study found that immigration enforcement in the US leads to declining production in the US dairy industry and that dairy operators respond to immigration enforcement by automating their operations (rather than hire new labor).

A 2021 study in the American Economic Journal found that illegal immigrants had beneficial effects on the employment and wages of American natives. Stricter immigration enforcement adversely affected employment and wages of American natives.

== Innovation and entrepreneurship ==
A 2017 survey of the existing economic literature found that "high-skilled migrants boost innovation and productivity outcomes." According to a 2013 survey of the existing economic literature, "much of the existing research points towards positive net contributions by immigrant entrepreneurs." Areas where immigrant are more prevalent in the United States have substantially more innovation (as measured by patenting and citations). Immigrants to the United States create businesses at higher rates than natives.

A 2010 study showed "that a 1 percentage point increase in immigrant college graduates' population share increases patents per capita by 9–18 percent." Mass migration can also boost innovation and growth, as shown by the Jewish, Huguenot and Bohemian diasporas in Berlin and Prussia, German Jewish Émigrés in the US, the Mariel boatlift, the exodus of Soviet Jews to Israel in the 1990s, European migration to Argentina during the Age of Mass Migration (1850–1914), west-east migration in the wake of German reunification, German migration to Russian Empire, and Polish immigration to Germany after joining the EU. A 2018 study in the Economic Journal found that "a 10% increase in immigration from exporters of a given product is associated with a 2% increase in the likelihood that the host country starts exporting that good 'from scratch' in the next decade." A 2024 Quarterly Journal of Economics study found that EU migration to the United States had substantial economic benefits on both the EU and the US in the long-term, as EU migrants become vastly more productive and innovative after moving to the United States.

Immigrants have been linked to greater invention and innovation. According to one report, "immigrants have started more than half (44 of 87) of America's startup companies valued at $1 billion dollars or more and are key members of management or product development teams in over 70 percent (62 of 87) of these companies." One analysis found that immigrant-owned firms had a higher innovation rate (on most measures of innovation) than firms owned by U.S.-born entrepreneurs. Research also shows that labor migration increases human capital. Foreign doctoral students are a major source of innovation in the American economy. In the United States, immigrant workers hold a disproportionate share of jobs in science, technology, engineering, and math (STEM): "In 2013, foreign-born workers accounted for 19.2 percent of STEM workers with a bachelor's degree, 40.7 percent of those with a master's degree, and more than half – 54.5 percent – of those with a PhD"

Using 130 years of data on historical migrations to the United States, one study finds "that a doubling of the number of residents with ancestry from a given foreign country relative to the mean increases by 4.2 percentage points the probability that at least one local firm invests in that country, and increases by 31% the number of employees at domestic recipients of FDI from that country. The size of these effects increases with the ethnic diversity of the local population, the geographic distance to the origin country, and the ethno-linguistic fractionalization of the origin country." A 2017 study found that "immigrants' genetic diversity is significantly positively correlated with measures of U.S. counties' economic development [during the Age of Mass Migration]. There exists also a significant positive relationship between immigrants' genetic diversity in 1870 and contemporaneous measures of U.S. counties' average income."

Some research suggests that immigration can offset some of the adverse effects of automation on native labor outcomes.

== See also ==
- Economic impact of immigration to Canada
- Immigration country
- Immigration reform
- Multiculturalism
- People smuggling
- Repatriation
- Replacement migration
- Non-citizen suffrage
- Non-resident citizen voting
- Skilled worker#Migration
- White genocide conspiracy theory
- Women migrant workers from developing countries
- Xenophobia
