= Semir Mahjoub =

Swedish-Tunisian businessman

- Born: December 19, 1964 (age 61); Tunis, Tunisia

Semir Mahjoub also known as Samir Mahjoub (born December 19, 1964) is a Swedish-Tunisian businessman.

== Biography ==
Semir Mahjoub held different positions at Ericsson between 1994 and 2000, and between 2005 and 2012, including President of mobile commerce company Ericsson Money Services. In 2000, he co-founded and was then the CEO of telecommunications software company Incomit, which was acquired by BEA Systems in 2005.

Mahjoub holds a Master's degree in Computer Science and Engineering from Chalmers University of Technology.
