= Teju Ajani =

Nigerian business executive

- Born: Teju Ajani; Nigeria
- Education: Golden Gate University; Stanford University
- Occupations: Business executive; Speaker; Writer

Teju Ajani is a global technology executive and a Software Engineer. She recently served as the Managing Director (Nigeria) for Apple Inc. She was Apple Inc's first African top-executive employee in Africa and the first woman in that role.

The technology expert has work experience with BEA Systems, VMware, Oracle, Google and Apple and is recognized as one of the influential women in technology by various organizations, and a featured speaker across technology and media circles.

== Early life and education ==
Born in Nigeria, she attended Federal Government Girls College, Sagamu and holds a Bachelor of Science (BS) in Economics and a Master of Science in Software Engineering (MSSE) from Golden Gate University in San Francisco.

She also has various certificates in Startup Management from Stanford University Pragmatic Institute, and Google respectively.

== Career ==
Ajani worked as a software engineer at Vovida networks in California. She joined BEA systems and worked as a Developer Relations Engineer and as a systems engineer in her early career. She switched paths and worked as a senior customer programs manager at VMware.

In 2011, she served as a principal product manager at Oracle before joining Google in 2012 as its business development manager in Nigeria. In 2014, she joined YouTube as its head of content partnerships for Sub-Saharan Africa. And in 2018 she assumed the role of country manager for Android partnerships for Google. She was appointed managing director of Apple in Nigeria in 2021.

She is an advocate for women in leadership and technology, and an active investor and advisor in Startup circles.
