= Plumtree (disambiguation) =

Plumtree may refer to:

- a plum tree

== Places ==
- Plumtree, North Carolina
- Plumtree, Nottinghamshire
- Plumtree, Zimbabwe
  - Plumtree School, Zimbabwe

== Other ==
- Plumtree (band), a band from Halifax, Canada
- Plumtree Software
- John Plumtree, South African rugby union coach
