= Pro Football Prospectus =

Annual book series

Pro Football Prospectus was an annual book series published from 2002 to 2008. It reviewed the previous NFL season and previewed the upcoming season. Its brand of statistical analysis set it apart from the annual magazines that covered the same territory, and it became increasingly popular with fantasy football players.

The series was a spinoff of the popular Baseball Prospectus brand. The PFP series was created by Sean Lahman in 2002, and with his co-author Todd Greanier they produced the first three editions. Aaron Schatz and his Football Outsiders took over the series in 2005.

In 2009 the publisher of the various Prospectus books, Plume, decided to not publish any of the non-baseball prospectuses, so the Pro Football Prospectus in 2009 was renamed the Football Outsiders Almanac.
