= Laboratoria =

Peruvian organization for trans women

- Formation: 2014; 12 years ago
- Founders: Mariana Costa Checa; Herman Marin; Rodulfo Prieto
- Purpose: Technical and life-skills training for Latin American women to join the tech sector
- Website: www.laboratoria.la

Laboratoria is an organization founded in 2014 in Lima, Peru, that trains women in technology skills. It operates 6-month, 100% remote bootcamps focused on web development, UX design, and technical and life skills. The program is aimed at women who have faced barriers to starting careers in technology. Following the bootcamp, Laboratoria provides employment support to help graduates secure jobs in the tech sector. The organization has a community of over 3,500 graduates who have been hired by more than 1,100 companies. In 2024 Laboratoria reported an average job placement rate of 79%.

== History ==
Laboratoria was created to revert the disadvantages women face in accessing quality jobs in the growing digital economy. It began with a pilot training program for 15 women and rapidly expanded, with 3,500 graduates.

Since its foundation in Lima, Peru, in 2014, Laboratoria has expanded to Bolivia, Brazil, Chile, Colombia, Costa Rica, Ecuador, México, Panamá, Paraguay and Uruguay. Today, due to it being a remote first company, it has been able to reach more countries in Latin America and beyond. Women from different cities and regions have been able to go through the bootcamp, thanks to the absence of geographic boundaries. It also has over 120 team members working daily to have a more profound social impact in the region.

Over 3,500 women have graduated as web developers and UX designers, with an average job placement rate of 79%. Laboratoria is also a source of female tech talent for leading companies in a wide variety of industries. More than 1,100 companies have hired Laboratoria talent.

== Awards and recognitions ==
- Mariana Costa was recognized in the Merco 2023 ranking, for her leadership work in Laboratoria, in the Technology category.
- Mariana Costa was selected by Bloomberg for its Catalysts program, which highlights founders, activists, entrepreneurs, policymakers, scientists, visionaries, and even elected officials whose remarkable work in business, philanthropy, and government, especially in emerging markets, demands recognition.
- Laboratoria was highlighted as one of the companies that leaves its mark on the digital ecosystem in the eWomen category of eCommerce Day Peru 2023, organized by the Lima Chamber of Commerce.
- Gabriela Rocha received the Latin American Leaders Award from The Global School for New Leadership in 2022.
- Mariana Costa was selected by Fortune magazine in its 40 Under 40 ranking in the Tech and Innovation section in 2022.
- Laboratoria was recognized as one of the 100 most promising edtech startups in Latin America and the Caribbean by HolonIQ in 2022.
- Laboratoria was selected to be part of the National Inclusive Employment Report (INEI) 2022 in Colombia, as part of the call for success stories.
- Forbes Peru places Mariana Costa among the 50 most powerful women in the country in 2022. The special issue of the magazine highlights the contribution of Peruvian women in different areas, such as business, economy, academia, art, science and technology, among other sectors. In order to choose the 50 women, the resources they manage in their organizations and the impact they generate in their communities were evaluated.
- Mariana Costa was chosen as one of the most influential, innovative and pioneering people in fintech, e-commerce, politics and digital infrastructure in the RoW100: Global Tech's Changemakers ranking (2022).
- McKinsey & Company recognizes Mariana Costa on its The Committed Innovator list, which highlights women in corporate, academic and entrepreneurial fields around the world who are creating groundbreaking breakthroughs in some of the most challenging issues on the planet. These women leaders are pioneering, expanding frontiers and building legacies in agriculture, banking, beauty, education, fashion, health and technology, 2021.
- Mariana Costa is recognized by Google.org as a "Leader to watch" in 2022. Google's philanthropic arm selected seven leaders in the world, including the Peruvian entrepreneur, the only representative from Latin America.
- Laboratoria was recognized as one of the 100 edtechs in Latin America in 2021 by HolonIQ, an intelligence platform that provides data and analysis of developments in the global market and annually publishes a ranking of the most promising startups in the region. The evaluation was made after a review of more than 2,000 edtechs.
- Mariana Costa was chosen by the Project Management Institute (PMI), an American organization with nearly 500,000 members in almost 100 countries, as one of the winners of the Future 50 in 2021, which features emerging leaders who are creating, building and transforming the world through remarkable projects, 2021.
- Bloomberg online presented a list of the 100 Innovators of 2021, in which they selected the Latinos who, during the pandemic, not only invented models, but also corrected their steps and even reinvented themselves to adapt to this new economic and social scenario.
- Mariana Costa Checa is part of the Wonderful Women of the World 2021 anthology, which – in comic format – shows the work of outstanding women around the world.
- Holon IQ 2020 Latam EdTech 100
- Transforming Lives Award Alquity, 2019
- Women Leading in Technology and Impact, Engineering for Change, 2018
- TEDxPlaceDeNations Speaker, 2018
- Equals in Tech Award – ITU, UN, Internet Society, 2018
- Change Agent Abie Award - AnitaB.org – Grace Hopper Celebration, 2018
- Ashoka Fellow – Mariana Costa, as Cofounder and CEO, since 2017 to the present day
- World Summit Awards, 2017.
- MIT Inclusive Innovation Challenge – Winner Matching Category, 2016
- BBC – 100 Most Influential Women, 2016
- DAI Innovation Into Action Challenge, 2016
- Google Rise Awards, 2015.
