= WebLogic =

American software company (1995–1998)

WebLogic, Inc.
- Type: Private
- Founded: September 1995
- Defunct: September 28, 1998
- Fate: Acquired by BEA Systems
- Headquarters: San Francisco, California, United States
- Key people: Paul Ambrose (co-founder); Bob Pasker (co-founder); Laurie Pitman (co-founder); Carl Resnikoff (co-founder); Ali Kutay (President & CEO, 1998)
- Products: WebLogic Tengah (Application Server) jdbcKona dbKona htmlKona
- Number of employees: ~100
- Parent: BEA Systems (from 1998)

WebLogic, Inc. was an American middleware software company headquartered in San Francisco, California, active from September 1995 until its acquisition by BEA Systems in September 1998. The company is credited with developing the first commercially deployed Java Enterprise Edition application server. Its core server product, initially designated the T3Server and later marketed as WebLogic Tengah, became the foundation for what is now Oracle WebLogic Server.

== History ==
=== Founding ===
Paul Ambrose, Bob Pasker, Laurie Pitman, and Carl Resnikoff founded WebLogic, Inc. in September 1995 in San Francisco, California. The founders pursued what they described at the time as an "Application Server"—a middleware layer connecting web clients to enterprise database systems. A participant who joined the founding team in 1996 later described the company at that stage as "a small company with some excellent JDBC drivers and a rudimentary Java server with events, servlets, rowsets, and remoting." The company's early advertising slogan, "Elevating Java to the Enterprise," reflected its stated ambition to displace existing enterprise infrastructure with a Java-based distributed systems platform.

WebLogic was backed by Regis McKenna and Frank J. Caufield as well as institutional investors including Bay Partners, Intel, Atos Consulting Switzerland, and TL Ventures.

=== Products ===
==== T3Server and WebLogic Tengah ====
The company's server product originated as the T3Server, a designation derived from "three-tier server." Version 1.48 of the product carried this name. The server was subsequently renamed WebLogic Tengah, which shipped through version 3.1. Version 3.1 was the last release under the Tengah designation; subsequent releases by BEA Systems were renumbered beginning at version 4.0.

The T3 communications protocol, developed by WebLogic, Inc. and named for its three-tier architecture origins, provided an optimized transport layer between server instances and Java clients. T3 established a single JVM-to-JVM connection that multiplexed all service traffic, including EJB and JDBC calls, over a single TCP/IP connection. This protocol persisted through all subsequent BEA and Oracle releases of the product.

==== jdbcKona ====
WebLogic's jdbcKona product line comprised native JDBC drivers for Oracle, Sybase, and Microsoft SQL Server. These drivers implemented the JDBC 1.22 specification and were among the earliest commercially available pure-Java and native-library database connectivity solutions for enterprise Java applications.

==== dbKona ====
dbKona was a high-level database connectivity API that sat above the JDBC layer and worked with any JDBC-compliant driver, including WebLogic's own jdbcKona products. It provided vendor-independent abstractions for querying and modifying relational data, including automatic SQL generation, client-side result caching, and support for heterogeneous multi-database queries within a single application. In a multitier deployment, dbKona operated in conjunction with WebLogic JDBC, eliminating the requirement for client-side native database libraries.

==== htmlKona ====
htmlKona was a Java package enabling server-side generation of dynamic HTML pages. Used in conjunction with WebLogic HTTP Servlets and dbKona, it allowed Java applications to produce interactive, per-user web content without client-side scripting dependencies.

=== J2EE Application Server ===
WebLogic, Inc. is credited with producing the first commercially deployed J2EE application server. The Tengah product shipped in 1997, predating the formal release of the Java 2 Platform, Enterprise Edition 1.2 specification by Sun Microsystems, which was published in December 1999. The Tengah server implemented servlet handling, JNDI-based naming, connection pooling, and distributed RMI services that the subsequent J2EE specification formalized. Copyright notices in BEA's post-acquisition API documentation confirm WebLogic, Inc.'s authorship of core framework classes dating to 1997–1998.

=== Leadership ===
In 1998, WebLogic, Inc. appointed Ali Kutay as President and CEO in advance of the BEA Systems acquisition.

=== Acquisition by BEA Systems ===
BEA Systems acquired WebLogic, Inc. on September 28, 1998, for $192 million in stock. BEA's stated rationale was to combine WebLogic's Java-based server technology with its Tuxedo transaction processing monitor to create a unified platform for Internet-scale transaction processing. The product was subsequently marketed as BEA WebLogic Server, beginning with version 4.0.

The engineering organization remained largely intact following the acquisition. A foreword to the 2003 technical reference BEA WebLogic Server 8.1 Unleashed noted "extremely small attrition in the engineering organization" and attributed the product's continuity across releases to the engineers' identification with the original WebLogic, Inc. codebase.

== Subsequent ownership ==
Following BEA Systems' 1998 acquisition of WebLogic, Inc., Oracle Corporation acquired BEA Systems in 2008, incorporating the server into its Oracle Fusion Middleware portfolio as Oracle WebLogic Server. Oracle WebLogic Server continues in active development as of 2025, supporting Jakarta EE deployments on-premises and in cloud environments.

== Version history (WebLogic, Inc. era) ==
Version	Release name	Notes
1.x	T3Server	Initial product; "T3" = three-tier server
1.48	T3Server	Last release under T3Server designation
2.x–3.0	WebLogic Tengah	Renamed product line
3.1	WebLogic Tengah 3.1	Last release by WebLogic, Inc. prior to BEA acquisition

Subsequent releases beginning at version 4.0 were issued by BEA Systems under the BEA WebLogic Server name.

== See also ==
- BEA Systems
- Oracle WebLogic Server
- Java Platform, Enterprise Edition
- Application server
- Java Database Connectivity
