= George Reyes =

American businessman

George Reyes is the former CFO of Google. He was formerly a director of BEA Systems, Symantec, and LifeLock.

Reyes was the CFO of Google from 2003–2008, his announcement of retirement came in 2007. He became the CFO, Senior VP in 2006. Reyes received his Bachelor of Arts degree in accounting from the University of South Florida. He then went on to earn his master's degree in business administration from Santa Clara University. Reyes has spent 13 years at Sun Microsystems and held a variety of jobs, including Vice President and Corporate Controller from April 1994 to April 1999. He then became Vice President and Treasurer from April 1999 to September 2001. In 2000 George joined Symantec's board of directors. From February 2002 to June 2002, Reyes was an interim Chief Financial Officer for ONI Systems in which he helped the sale of Ciena Corporation and ONI.

Reyes is Cuban American. His nephew Gregory Reyes is a former CEO of Brocade and his brother Gregorio Reyes is a member of the Board of Directors of Seagate Technologies. On August 28, 2007, George Reyes announced that he would retire from his job at Google as CFO in the near future and would help Google to replace his position. He was replaced as CFO by Patrick Pichette as of August 12, 2008.
He died on November 8, 2023.
