= Edward W. Scott =

American businessman and philanthropist

Edward W. Scott Jr.
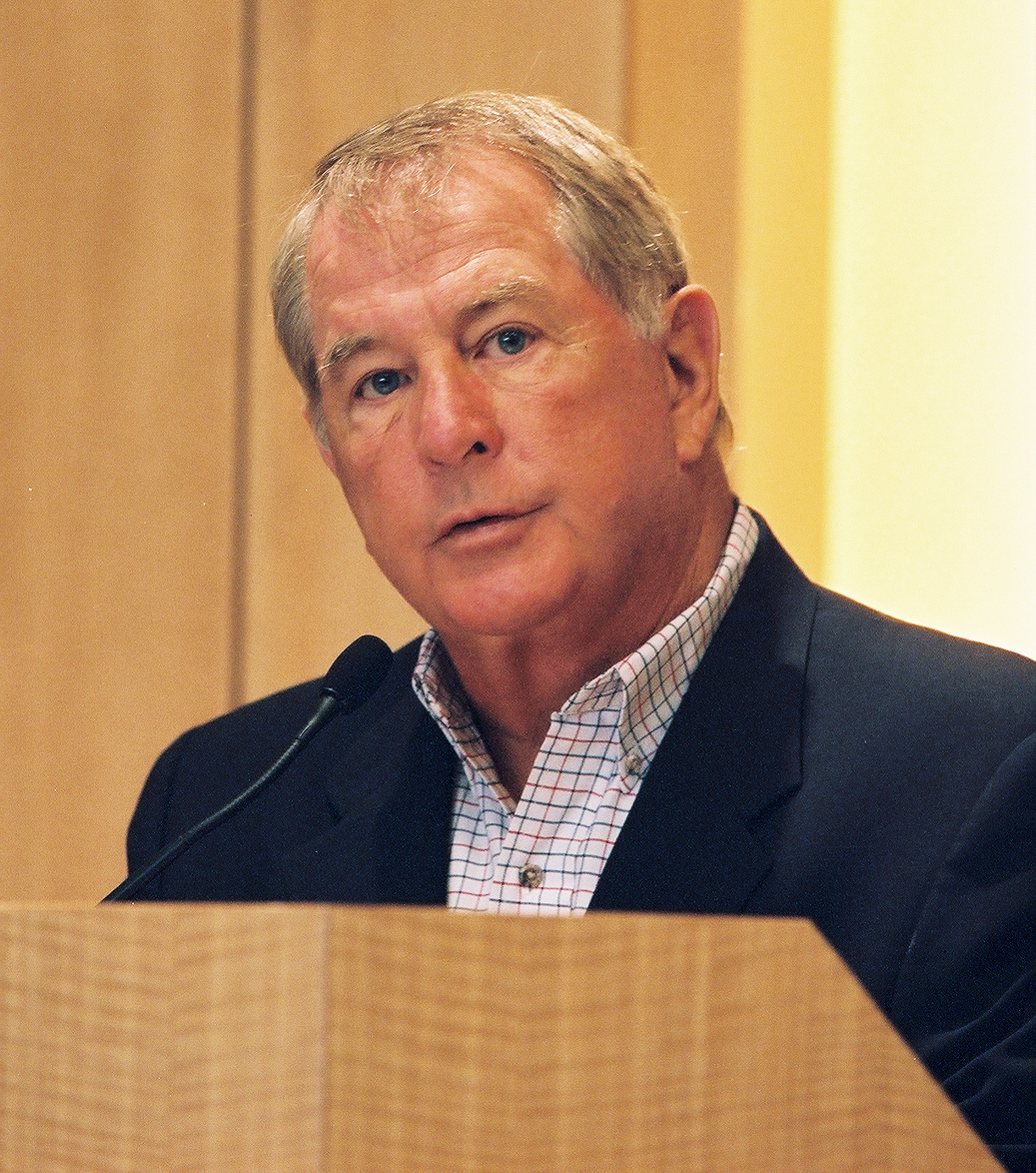
- Ed Scott in March 2008
- Education: Michigan State University (BA, MA); University College, Oxford (BA)

Edward W. Scott Jr. is an American businessman, philanthropist, and former senior United States government official. Along with Bill Coleman and Alfred Chuang, he founded enterprise software company BEA Systems.

== Education ==
Scott was educated at Michigan State University where he received a B.A. and an M.A. in political science. He also holds a degree in Philosophy, Politics, and Economics from University College, Oxford. In May 2011, Scott received an honorary Doctor of Humane Letters degree from the Florida Institute of Technology, where he served as the commencement speaker. In May 2012, Scott received an Outstanding Alumni Award from Michigan State University. In May 2016, Scott was awarded the 2016 BNP Paribas Grand Prize for Individual Philanthropy.

== Career ==
=== Government ===
Scott worked for the United States government for seventeen years. Scott served under seven Attorneys General, reaching the position of Deputy Assistant Attorney General for Administration in the Office of Management and Finance in the Department of Justice. He also served three Secretaries of Transportation. During the Carter administration, Scott served as an Assistant Secretary for Administration in the Department of Transportation and was a recipient of the Presidential Rank Award of Distinguished Executive as well as the William A. Jump Memorial Foundation Meritorious Award for Exemplary Achievement in Public Administration.

=== Business ===
After leaving government service, Scott entered the technology industry, working for Computer Consoles Inc., Pyramid Technology and Sun Microsystems where he co-founded Sun Federal, which provided outsourcing services to the U.S. government. Scott co-founded BEA Systems in 1995, where he was President and Executive Vice President for World Wide Field Operations. He now has no direct role in the management of the firm. Oracle purchased BEA Systems in 2008 for $8.5 billion.

In November 2001, Scott co-founded the Center for Global Development with C. Fred Bergsten and Nancy Birdsall. He is currently CGD's Chairman Emeritus. In 2002, Scott co-founded the advocacy organization DATA together with Bill Gates and George Soros. DATA has now joined forces with the ONE Campaign, which Bono co-founded.

In 2004, Scott founded Friends of the Global Fight Against AIDS, Tuberculosis and Malaria, originally led by Jack Valenti, which provides support in the U.S. for The Global Fund to Fight AIDS, Tuberculosis and Malaria. He serves as Chairman Emeritus. He also sits on the board of advisors of the Center for Strategic and International Studies Global Health Policy Center and Whole Child International. In 2008, Scott founded the Center for Interfaith Action on Global Poverty (CIFA).

In 2007, Scott established and funded the Scott Family Liberia Fellows program, which provides a cadre of trained economists and development specialists that work directly for the cabinet secretaries of various Liberian ministries to assist the President of Liberia. He was the principal donor to create the Scott Center for Autism Treatment at the Florida Institute of Technology, where he serves on the board of trustees. Scott also serves on the Chancellor's Court of Benefactors of the University of Oxford, where he endowed a Chair in Psychiatry and two research fellowships dedicated to the study of the causes and possible treatments of autism spectrum disorders. Scott also established a special program at University College, Oxford for admission to the college of students with severe disabilities.

In 2008, Scott founded the Center for Interfaith Action on Global Poverty (CIFA), to improve the capacity and effectiveness of faith communities to reduce poverty and disease.

In 2012, at the 2012 Child Survival Call to Action, CIFA and Religions for Peace launched Ten Promises to Our Children, a commitment to engage religious communities around the world to save children’s lives through ten concrete and specific acts.

In 2013, CIFA merged with Religions for Peace.

In 2016, Ed Scott was awarded the BNP Paribas Wealth Management prize for individual philanthropy for his philanthropic achievements.

Scott is the largest investor in Tyton BioEnergy Systems, a company developing solutions for producing biofuels. In addition, Scott is the owner of Tyton NC Biofuels, a biofuel production facility in North Carolina. Scott serves on the Board of Voxiva. Scott is also an investor in Spreecast. In addition, Scott is the chairman of the board of directors and the majority shareholder of the Florida Beer Company. Scott founded, built, owns, and operates the Kiwi Tennis Club in Indian Harbour Beach, Florida.

=== Academics ===
Scott is a frequent lecturer around the world on issues of global development, global public health, technology, and entrepreneurship. He has spoken at a number of universities including Oxford University and Georgetown University as well as at variety of venues ranging from the Aspen Ideas Festival to the Washington National Cathedral Sunday Forum.

== Publications ==
=== Journalism ===
- Edward W. Scott Jr., "The Fight Against AIDS, Tuberculosis and Malaria: Past Progress and Hope for the Future", UN Chronicle, December 2007.
- Daniel Goldrich and Edward W. Scott, "Developing Political Orientations of Panamanian Students", Journal of Politics, February 1961.

=== Lectures ===
- Ed Scott's lectures on Vimeo
- Ed Scott as the Washington National Cathedral Sunday Forum guest on December 6, 2009
- Edward Scott Jr. as a panelist for "The Global Fight Against HIV/AIDS" at Georgetown University on February 19, 2009
- Remarks by CIFA Founder and Chairman Ed Scott at the "Leadership Consultation On Scaling Up The Faith Community Impact Against Malaria" at Georgetown University on December 12, 2008
- Ed Scott as a panelist for the launch event of the Global Health Policy Center at the Center for Strategic and International Studies on September 29, 2008
- Ed Scott CSIS Global Health Policy Podcast MP3
