= Football Outsiders =

American football website

- Available in: English
- Creator: Aaron Schatz
- Website: www.footballoutsiders.com
- Launched: August 2003; 23 years ago

Football Outsiders (FO) was a website started in July 2003 which focused on advanced statistical analysis of the National Football League (NFL). The site was run by a staff of regular writers, who produced a series of weekly columns using both the site's in-house statistics and their personal analyses of NFL games.

In 2005 and 2006, the site partnered with FOXSports.com to cross-publish many of the Outsiders' regular features, including power rankings based on a "weighted" version of the DVOA (Defense-adjusted Value Over Average) statistic. In 2007, Football Outsiders content appeared on FOXSports.com (in a reduced capacity) along with AOL Sports and ESPN.com. Since 2008, the site has partnered exclusively with ESPN and provides mostly ESPN Insider content. In 2009, Football Outsiders began analyzing college football using similar statistical principles.

As of 2023, after financial mismanagement, the site seems to have been abandoned by its owners. As of September 1, 2023, the website was no longer accessible. DVOA statistics have been moved to FTN Fantasy, which is owned by FTN Network. Aaron Schatz joined FTN Network as Chief Analytics Officer on August 29, 2023.

== History ==
Football Outsiders was launched in August 2003 by Aaron Schatz, with two regular columns, one of which used an early version of the proprietary DVOA statistic. The original purpose of the site was to disprove a statement by Boston Globe reporter Ron Borges that the 2002 New England Patriots failed to make the postseason because they could not establish the run. Over the course of time, the site added more writers, and hosted Gregg Easterbrook for part of 2003.

Between 2004 and 2005, the site introduced new statistics such as Defense-adjusted Points Above Replacement (DPAR, later Defense-adjusted Yards Above Replacement, DYAR) and Adjusted Line Yards (ALY). In 2005, the site began to cross-publish many of its columns on FOXsports.com. In 2005, Football Outsiders also took over publication of Pro Football Prospectus, a book giving a preview of the upcoming NFL season. In 2009, the annual was renamed Football Outsiders Almanac.

Currently, the site has incorporated the 1981–2022 NFL seasons into their statistics.

== Key Metrics ==
Football Outsiders has devised a series of proprietary formulas to calculate different advanced metrics.

=== DVOA ===
DVOA (Defense-adjusted Value Over Average) calculates a team's success based on the down-and-distance of each play during the season, then calculates how much more or less successful each team is compared to the league average. According to Football Outsiders, DVOA "breaks down every single play of the NFL season to see how much success offensive players achieved in each specific situation compared to the league average in that situation, adjusted for the strength of the opponent. ... Football has one objective -- to get to the end zone -- and two ways to achieve that, by gaining yards and getting first downs. These two goals need to be balanced to determine a player's value or a team's performance."

There is a separate DVOA measurement for special teams, which "compare[s] each kick or punt to the league average for based on the point value of field position at the position of each kick, catch, and return."

=== DYAR ===
DYAR (Defense-adjusted Yards Above Replacement) calculates each player's cumulative value above or below a "replacement-level" alternative. DYAR differs from DVOA in calculating a player's total value through the course of a year, and not on a play-for-play rate. States Football Outsiders, "DVOA, by virtue of being a percentage or rate statistic, doesn’t take into account the cumulative value of having a player producing at a league-median level over the course of an above-average number of plays. By definition, a median level of performance is better than that provided by half of the league and the ability to maintain that level of performance while carrying a heavy work load is very valuable indeed."

=== Adjusted Line Yards ===
Adjusted Line Yards (ALY) "differentiate[s] between the contribution of the running back and the contribution of the offensive line." ALY attempts to "separate the effect that the running back has on a particular play from the effect of the offensive line (and other offensive blockers) and the effect of the defense. ... Yardage ends up falling into roughly the following combinations: Losses, 0-4 yards, 5-10 yards, and 11+ yards. In general, the offensive line is 20% more responsible for lost yardage than it is for yardage gained up to four yards, but 50% less responsible for yardage gained from 5-10 yards, and not responsible for yardage past that. Thus, the creation of Adjusted Line Yards."

=== Drive Stats ===
Drive Stats calculate a team's average success rate on a possession-by-possession basis: "[E]ach team's total number of drives as well as average yards per drive, points per drive, touchdowns per drive, punts per drive, and turnovers per drive, interceptions per drive, and fumbles lost per drive. LOS/Drive represents average starting field position (line of scrimmage) per drive from the offensive point of view. Drive stats are given for offense and defense, with NET representing simply offense minus defense."

=== Pythagorean projection ===
Another metric Football Outsiders uses is Pythagorean projection, which estimates wins in a season by a formula originally conceived by baseball analyst Bill James, that takes the square of team points, and divides it by the sum of the squares of team points scored and allowed.

The 2011 edition of Football Outsiders Almanac states, "From 1988 through 2004, 11 of 16 Super Bowls were won by the team that led the NFL in Pythagorean wins, while only seven were won by the team with the most actual victories. Super Bowl champions that led the league in Pythagorean wins but not actual wins include the 2004 Patriots, 2000 Ravens, 1999 Rams and 1997 Broncos."

Although Football Outsiders Almanac acknowledges that the formula had been less-successful in picking Super Bowl participants from 2005 to 2008, it reasserted itself in 2009 and 2010.

Furthermore, "[t]he Pythagorean projection is also still a valuable predictor of year-to-year improvement. Teams that win a minimum of one full game more than their Pythagorean projection tend to regress the following year; teams that win a minimum of one full game less than their Pythagorean projection tend to improve the following year, particularly if they were at or above .500 despite their underachieving. For example, the 2008 New Orleans Saints went 8-8 despite 9.5 Pythagorean wins, hinting at the improvement that came with the next year's championship season."

== DVOA results ==
Each year, Football Outsiders calculates the best and worst teams, per play, with the DVOA metric (see above). Below is a list of the highest- and lowest-rated teams in the league in each year from 1978 to 2019.

Since Football Outsiders shut down in 2023, DVOA stats have been moved to FTN Fantasy; a historical archive of DVOA rankings dating back to 1978 is available.

= Team Won Super Bowl
= Team Awarded First Overall Draft Pick in following year's draft

Season	Best DVOA rating	DVOA	Worst DVOA rating	DVOA	Notes
2025	Seattle Seahawks	41.2%	New York Jets	-35.9%	Las Vegas Raiders got #1 pick
2024	Baltimore Ravens	41.4%	Cleveland Browns	-39.9%	Philadelphia Eagles won Super Bowl LIX, Tennessee Titans got #1 pick
2023	Baltimore Ravens	45.5%	Carolina Panthers	-35.3%	Kansas City Chiefs won Super Bowl LVIII; Panthers finished with worst record, but #1 pick was owned by Chicago Bears
2022	Buffalo Bills	38.9%	Indianapolis Colts	-29.3%	Kansas City Chiefs won Super Bowl LVII, Chicago Bears got #1 pick.
2021	Dallas Cowboys	29.3%	New York Giants	-31.4%	Los Angeles Rams won Super Bowl LVI, Jacksonville Jaguars got #1 pick
2020	New Orleans Saints	32.0%	Jacksonville Jaguars	-31.1%	Tampa Bay Buccaneers won Super Bowl LV
2019	Baltimore Ravens	38.5%	Miami Dolphins	-37.4%	Kansas City Chiefs won Super Bowl LIV, Cincinnati Bengals got #1 pick.
2018	Kansas City Chiefs	34.8%	Arizona Cardinals	-37.6%	New England Patriots won Super Bowl LIII.
2017	Minnesota Vikings	33.0%	New York Giants	-28.7%	Philadelphia Eagles won Super Bowl LII, Cleveland Browns got #1 pick
2016	Atlanta Falcons	31.0%	Cleveland Browns	-33.8%	New England Patriots won Super Bowl LI
2015	Seattle Seahawks	35.4%	San Francisco 49ers	-31.2%	Denver Broncos won Super Bowl, Tennessee Titans got #1 pick.
2014	Denver Broncos	32.6%	Jacksonville Jaguars	-34.2%	New England Patriots won Super Bowl, Tampa Bay Buccaneers got #1 pick.
2013	Seattle Seahawks	35.8%	Jacksonville Jaguars	-37.5%	Houston Texans received #1 overall pick in 2014 draft.
2012	Denver Broncos	35.6%	Kansas City Chiefs	-40.7%	Baltimore Ravens won Super Bowl.
2011	New Orleans Saints	28.3%	Indianapolis Colts	-36.4%	New York Giants won Super Bowl.
2010	New England Patriots	45.7%	Carolina Panthers	-41.2%	Green Bay won Super Bowl
2009	New England Patriots	26.7%	Detroit Lions	-48.3%	New Orleans Saints won Super Bowl, St. Louis Rams got #1 overall pick
2008	Philadelphia Eagles	28.9%	Detroit Lions	-43.9%	Pittsburgh Steelers won Super Bowl
2007	New England Patriots	52.3%	San Francisco 49ers	-35.4%	New York Giants won Super Bowl, Miami Dolphins got #1 pick
2006	San Diego Chargers	29.7%	Oakland Raiders	-31.5%	Indianapolis Colts won Super Bowl
2005	Indianapolis Colts	30.7%	San Francisco 49ers	-49.7%	Pittsburgh Steelers won Super Bowl, Houston Texans got #1 pick
2004	New England Patriots	35.9%	San Francisco 49ers	-42.0%	
2003	Kansas City Chiefs	27.5%	Arizona Cardinals	-41.3%	New England Patriots won Super Bowl, San Diego Chargers got #1 pick
2002	Tampa Bay Buccaneers	30.7%	Houston Texans	-39.9%	Cincinnati Bengals got #1 overall pick
2001	St. Louis Rams	31.2%	Carolina Panthers	-24.4%	N.E. Patriots won Super Bowl, Panthers had #2 pick (to expansion Houston Texans)
2000	Tennessee Titans	31.2%	Cincinnati Bengals	-39.4%	Baltimore Ravens won Super Bowl, San Diego Chargers got #1 pick
1999	St. Louis Rams	36.4%	Cleveland Browns	-41.0%	
1998	Denver Broncos	34.9%	Philadelphia Eagles	-35.0%	Philadelphia had worst record, got #2 pick after expansion Cleveland Browns
1997	Green Bay Packers	33.9%	Chicago Bears	-31.1%	Denver Broncos won Super Bowl, Indianapolis Colts got #1 pick
1996	Green Bay Packers	39.7%	New York Jets	-30.9%	
1995	San Francisco 49ers	39.0%	Jacksonville Jaguars	-33.9%	Dallas Cowboys won Super Bowl, New York Jets got #1 pick
1994	Dallas Cowboys	33.9%	Houston Oilers	-27.9%	San Francisco 49ers won Super Bowl, Oilers picked #3 behind expansion Carolina/Jacksonville.
1993	San Francisco 49ers	27.8%	Indianapolis Colts	-36.6%	Dallas Cowboys won Super Bowl, Cincinnati Bengals got #1 overall pick
1992	Dallas Cowboys	35.3%	New England Patriots	-42.5%	
1991	Washington Redskins	49.5%	Indianapolis Colts	-49.5%	
1990	New York Giants	29.1%	New England Patriots	-41.0%	
1989	San Francisco 49ers	34.9%	Dallas Cowboys	-32.5%	Dallas had the league's worst record, but forfeited their first round pick
1988	San Francisco 49ers	23.7%	Kansas City Chiefs	-27.6%	Dallas Cowboys got #1 overall pick
1987	San Francisco 49ers	41.5%	Atlanta Falcons	-34.3%	Washington Redskins won Super Bowl
1986	Chicago Bears	30.5%	Tampa Bay Buccaneers	-42.8%	New York Giants won Super Bowl
1985	Chicago Bears	45.8%	Houston Oilers	-36.6%	Tampa Bay Buccaneers got #1 overall pick
1984	San Francisco 49ers	33.8%	Minnesota Vikings	-35.7%	Buffalo Bills got #1 overall pick
1983	Washington Redskins	35.8%	Houston Oilers	-32.4%	Los Angeles Raiders won Super Bowl, Tampa Bay Buccaneers got #1 overall pick
1982	New York Jets	27.4%	Houston Oilers	-42.3%	Washington Redskins won Super Bowl, Baltimore Colts got #1 overall pick
1981	Philadelphia Eagles	22.3%	Baltimore Colts	-32.9%	San Francisco 49ers won Super Bowl, New England Patriots got #1 overall pick
1980	Philadelphia Eagles	24.6%	New York Giants	-26.2%	Oakland Raiders won Super Bowl, New Orleans Saints got #1 overall pick
1979	Pittsburgh Steelers	30.9%	Detroit Lions	-25.7%	
1978	Dallas Cowboys	26.9%	San Francisco 49ers	-31.5%	Pittsburgh Steelers won Super Bowl

== Pro Football Prospectus and Football Outsiders Almanac ==
From 2005 through 2008, Football Outsiders published the Pro Football Prospectus book each year before the football season began. It included an essay for each team analyzing the previous season, evaluating off-season moves, and projecting future performance.

In 2009, Football Outsiders did not publish a Pro Football Prospectus volume, but instead produced the self-published Football Outsiders Almanac 2009. The reason for this is explained in the book:

So why the name change, and why aren’t we in bookstores?

For those who don’t know, our first four books were published through an agreement with Prospectus Entertainment Ventures, the company that owns Baseball Prospectus (as well as the expansion projects Basketball Prospectus and Puck Prospectus). It was PEV that had the publishing contract (first with Workman, then Plume). This year, for various reasons, Plume decided they no longer wanted to publish books related to other sports besides baseball. Other publishers were interested in doing our book, but by the time Plume made their decision, it was too late to get on the publication schedule for 2009.

== Management ==
Editor-in-Chief: Aaron Schatz
Senior Editor: Vince Verhei
Senior Writer: Mike Tanier

== Books ==
- Pro Football Forecast 2004 (ISBN 1574886584)
- Pro Football Prospectus 2005 (ISBN 0761140190)
- Pro Football Prospectus 2006 (ISBN 0761142177)
- Pro Football Prospectus 2007 (ISBN 0452288479)
- Pro Football Prospectus 2008 (ISBN 0452289734)
- Football Outsiders Almanac 2009 (ISBN 1448648459)
- Football Outsiders Almanac 2010 (ISBN 1453671188)
- Football Outsiders Almanac 2011 (ISBN 978-1-4662-4613-3)
- Football Outsiders Almanac 2012 (ISBN 978-1-4782-0152-6)

== General references ==
- Bob Glauber, "Glauber's NFL Hot Reads"], Newsday.com (September 1, 2009).
- "Football Outsider: Football Statistics from Outside the Box—An Interview with Aaron Schatz," SportsTechNow.com (January 25, 2008).
- Will Leitch, "A Conversation with Football Outsiders EIC Aaron Schatz", Deadspin, August 26, 2009.
- "Q.&A. with Mike Tanier of Football Outsiders," in The Fifth Down, New York Times N.F.L. Blog, The New York Times, September 21, 2009.

== See also ==
- The Hidden Game of Football
- Advanced Football Analytics
- numberFire
