= Incomit =

Swedish telecommunications software company

- Industry: telecommunications software
- Founded: 2000
- Founder: Semir Mahjoub; Thomas Gronberg; Anders Lunquist
- Successor: Oracle
- Headquarters: Sweden

Incomit (Incomit AB) is a Swedish telecommunications software company founded in 2000 by Semir Mahjoub, Thomas Gronberg and Anders Lunquist. The company provided software that integrated telecommunications network technology with Internet-based application software. In 2005, BEA Systems acquired Incomit incorporating its technology to form the core of BEA's telecommunications middleware products. In 2008, Oracle acquired BEA Systems and Incomit's original software became Oracle's Communications Service Delivery product.
