= Center for Global Development =

American international development think tank

- Abbreviation: CGD
- Formation: 2001; 25 years ago
- Type: Think tank
- Headquarters: 2055 L Street NW
- Location: Washington, D.C., United States
- President: Rachel Glennerster
- Revenue: $20,576,099 (2016)
- Expenses: $13,692,105 (2016)
- Website: www.cgdev.org

The Center for Global Development (CGD) is a nonprofit think tank based in Washington, D.C., and London that focuses on international development.

== History ==
It was founded in November 2001 by former senior U.S. official Edward W. Scott, director of the Peterson Institute for International Economics, C. Fred Bergsten, and Nancy Birdsall. Birdsall, the former vice president of the Inter-American Development Bank and former director of the Policy Research Department at the World Bank, became the center's first president. Lawrence Summers was unanimously elected in March 2014 by the CGD Board of Directors to succeed founding Board Chair Edward Scott Jr., on May 1, 2014. Summers would eventually resign from this position on November 17, 2025.

CGD was ranked the 13th most prominent think tank in the international development sphere by University of Pennsylvania's "2015 Global Go To Think Tank Index Report". In 2009, Foreign Policy magazine's Think-Tank Index listed CGD as one of the top 15 overall think-tanks in the US. CGD's stated mission is "to reduce global poverty and inequality by encouraging policy change in the United States and other rich countries through rigorous research and active engagement with the policy community. The center considers itself to be a "think and do" tank, with an emphasis on producing research that is channeled into practical policy proposals.

== Major programs ==
CGD has carried out debt-relief programs in Nigeria and Liberia. CGD vice president Todd Moss first proposed the Nigerian debt buy-back, which resulted in the Paris Club of rich nations forgiving 60% of $31 billion of debt. Former CGD senior fellow Steve Radelet advised Liberian president Ellen Johnson Sirleaf and her senior advisors on debt relief and aid coordination.

CGD is also known for creating the program called advance market commitments to encourage vaccine development for specific diseases. The G7 endorsed the approach and the Gates Foundation and five countries gave $1.5 billion to create a vaccine against strains of pneumonia.

In cooperation with Foreign Policy, CGD has published the Commitment to Development Index since 2003. The annual index ranks countries based on how their foreign aid, trade, migration, investment, environment, security and technology policies encourage global development.

The Center for Global Development in Europe was established in October 2011 with the aim of engaging with and learning from policymakers, academics, and researchers in Europe, and bringing the CGD blend of evidence-led, high-quality research and engagement to European policymaking and engagement about development. "CGD in Europe" research initiatives include "Europe Beyond Aid", Development Impact Bonds, and Illicit Financial Flows.

In November 2013, CGD purchased a new headquarters that includes a 170-seat conference center, a 60-seat boardroom/ideas lab, and a multimedia studio.

== Research ==
CGD conducts research within a range of topics that impact global poverty and people of the developing world. Topics include aid effectiveness, education, globalization and global health, as well as the impact of trade and migration on development.

The center is well known for its research on aid effectiveness. CGD president Nancy Birdsall developed in 2010 a Cash on Delivery (COD) Aid initiative, aiming to improve aid effectiveness by focusing foreign aid on outcomes, not inputs.

In 2008, CGD produced a compilation of essays edited by Nancy Birdsall called "The White House and the World: A Global Development Agenda for the Next U.S. President". These essays give policy recommendations to solve international problems, such as global health, foreign aid policy, migration, global warming and foreign direct investment.

CGD recently published a report on the dangers of drug resistance in "The Race against Drug Resistance: When Medicines Fail", which the Global Health team launched on June 14, 2010.

The center's Migration and Development Initiative aims to study the effects labor movement has not only on the receiving country, but also on the country of origin and the migrants themselves. CGD economists Michael Clemens and Lant Pritchett have advocated for a development agenda that incorporates migration from low and middle-income to high-income countries, where wages for the same task can be up to ten times higher. However, they argue that the misperception that development is about places rather than people often leads policymakers as well as economists to ignore the large benefits to the migrants themselves. Rich countries' immigration policies are also a factor in the Commitment to Development Index. CGD has advocated for temporary visas for Haitians to seasonally work in US agriculture and participated in an initiative to that end. In 2016, they issued a report on how policymakers can manage migration between the United States and Mexico to the benefit of both countries.

CGD Senior Fellow Ranil Dissanayake publishes a weekly blog associated with the Center for the Study of African Economies.

Other research topics listed on their website include capital flows/financial crises, debt relief, environmental issues, economic growth, governance/democracy, international financial institutions, finance, food and agriculture, inequality, population, poverty, private investment, security and development, and data sets and resources.

== Funding ==
CGD receives funding from foundations, governments, individuals, and corporations. The organization publishes information on its website for all grants and donations received that are above $100,000. CGD received the highest rating (five stars) from Transparify for its open disclosure of funding in 2014 and 2015. In 2013, the government of Norway gave CGD $5 million to support its work on tropical forests and development. That support was cited in a New York Times article about think tank funding.

A report by the Center for International Policy's Foreign Influence Transparency Initiative of the top 50 think tanks on the University of Pennsylvania's Global Go-To Think Tanks rating index found that during the period 2014-2018 the Center for Global Development received the second-highest amount of funding from outside the United States compared to any other think tank, with a total of more than US$37 million, though the center was commended for being "remarkably transparent about its funding sources."

== Initiatives ==
The center considers itself a "think and do" tank, and thus has multiple initiatives to implement their policy suggestions. These, initiatives attempt to give specific policy recommendations to organizations while creating a dialogue.

In 2003, David Roodman created the Commitment to Development Index with Foreign Policy magazine and Mapping Worlds. The Commitment to Development Index (CDI) ranks and analyzes nations’ financial and political commitments to development every year. The index uses interactive graphs and analyzes how countries contribute to development in seven policy areas: aid (both quantity as a share of income and quality), trade, investment, migration, environment, security, and technology.

Other initiatives include Cash on Delivery Aid, Combating Drug Resistance, Development Impact Bonds, Europe Beyond Aid, the Latin America Initiative, Migration as a Tool for Disaster Recovery, Oil-to-Cash: Fighting the Resource Curse through Cash Transfers, Pakistan: US Development Strategy, Preemptive Contract Sanctions, Reforming Trade Preferences, Rethinking US Development Policy, The Future of the World Bank, Tropical Forests for Climate and Development, Understanding India, and Value for Money: An Agenda for Global Health Funding Agencies. From November 2007 to November 2012, CGD published Carbon Monitoring For Action (CARMA), a searchable database that estimated carbon emissions of power plants and power companies around the world.

== Events ==
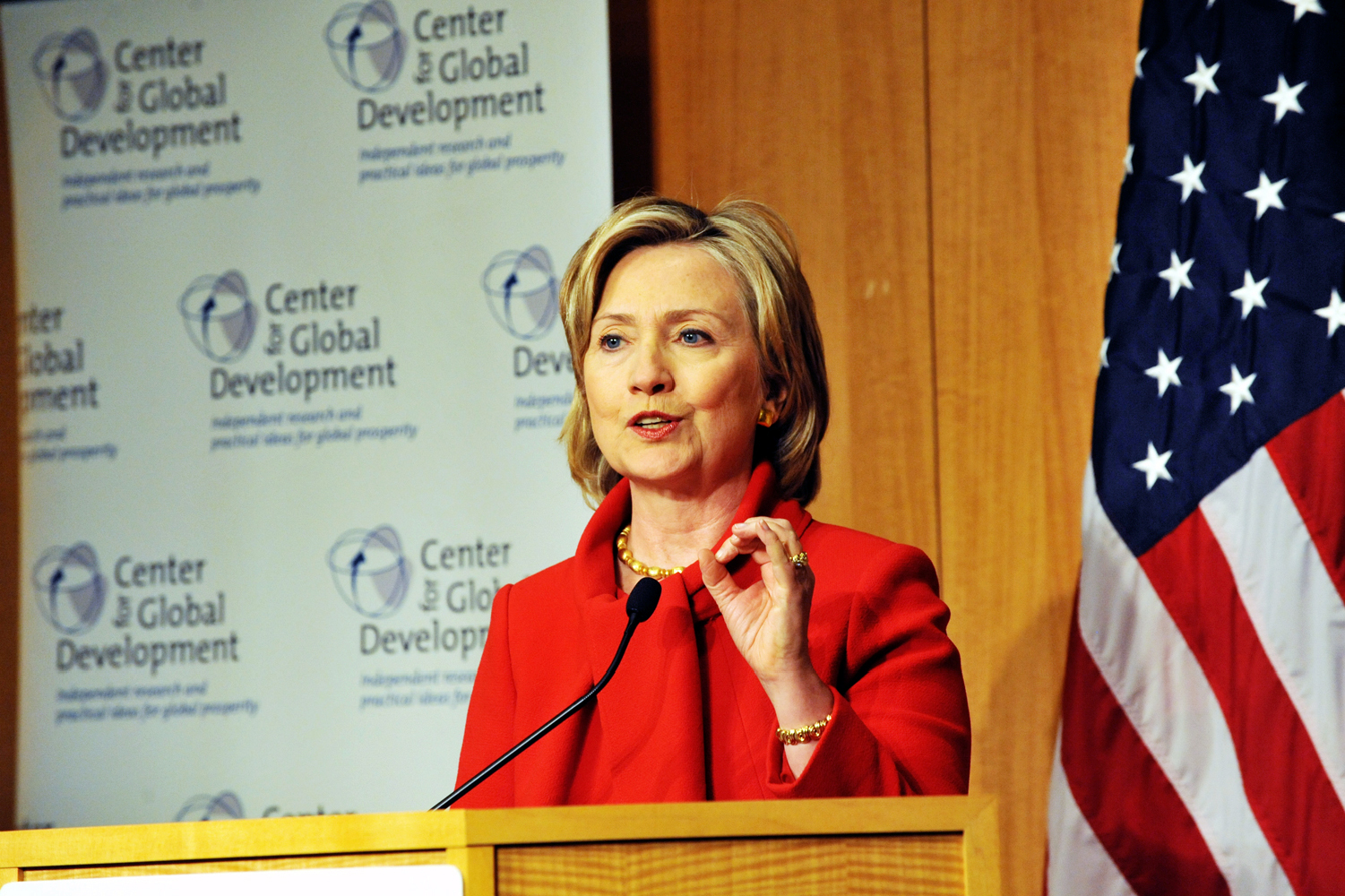
Secretary Clinton speaks at CGD about development in the 21st century.

CGD hosts about 200 public and private events a year that draw more than 7,000 participants. Events have featured speakers such as U.S. Secretary of State Hillary Clinton, President of Nigeria Goodluck Jonathan, economist Paul Romer, UK Secretary of State for International Development Andrew Mitchell, among many others.

During Secretary Hillary Clinton’s visit to CGD on January 6, 2010, she emphasized the importance of development and said it was "time to elevate development as a central pillar of our foreign policy and to rebuild USAID into the world's premier development agency". CGD hosts an annual lecture series called the Sabot Lecture series, in honor of the late development economist Richard "Dick" Sabot. Each year, the Sabot Lecture hosts a scholar-practitioner who has made significant contributions to international development, combining academic work with leadership in the policy community. Past Sabot speakers include Lawrence Summers, Ngozi Okonjo-Iweala, Lord Nicholas Stern, Kemal Dervis and Kenneth Rogoff.

== Stance on transphobia ==
In 2019, a tribunal brought by former visiting fellow Maya Forstater at the Central London Employment Tribunal found in favour of CGD in the initial stage of a claim of belief discrimination by a former worker. Employment Judge James Tayler found that Forstater's "gender critical" views were "incompatible with human dignity and fundamental rights of others" and that they did "not have the protected characteristic of philosophical belief" under the UK Equality Act 2010. However, in June 2021, an Employment Appeal Tribunal led by Akhlaq Choudhury overturned this judgment, finding that Forstater's beliefs were covered under the protected belief characteristic within the meaning of the Equality Act. The appeal was allowed after the appeal tribunal concluded the belief that "biological sex is real, important and immutable" met the legal test of a "genuine and important philosophical position", and "could not be shown to be a direct attempt to harm others." As such these beliefs were afforded protection under the Equality Act. The original tribunal's ruling that the belief was "not worthy of respect in a democratic society" was overturned. The appeal was supported by interventions by the UK's Equality and Human Rights Commission and the NGO Index on Censorship which both stated that 'gender critical' views should be considered a philosophical belief and thus protected under section 10 of the Equality Act.

CGD vice president Amanda Glassman released the following statement in reaction: "The decision is disappointing and surprising because we believe Judge Tayler got it right when he found this type of offensive speech causes harm to trans people, and therefore could not be protected under the Equality Act." On 30 June 2021, 87 staff members wrote a letter to management saying "We were disappointed to learn that the Employment Appeals Tribunal overturned its 2019 ruling ... We believe the original verdict was correct when it found that this type of offensive and exclusionary language and action causes harm to trans people and therefore could not be protected under the Equality Act."

== Notable fellows ==
=== Resident fellows ===
- Nancy Birdsall
- Kalipso Chalkidou
- Michael Clemens
- Lant Pritchett
- Liliana Rojas-Suarez

=== Visiting fellows ===
- Joyce Banda
- Ngozi Okonjo-Iweala
- Antoinette Sayeh

=== Non-resident fellows ===
- Abhijit Banerjee
- Chris Blattman
- Francis Fukuyama
- Paul Gertler
- Ravi Kanbur
- Dean Karlan
- Michael Kremer
- Nora Lustig
- Branko Milanović
- Sendhil Mullainathan
- Martin Ravallion
- Paul Romer
- Bogolo Kenewendo
