= Mariana Costa Checa =

Peruvian businesswoman

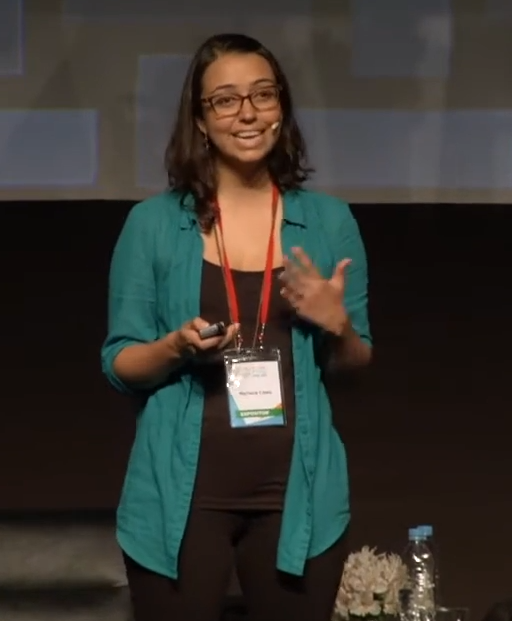
- Costa at her "Innovation and Empowerment" talk at APEC Peru 2016
- Born: 20 March 1986 (age 39); Lima, Peru
- Education: London School of Economics; Columbia University
- Occupation: Businesswoman
- Organization: Laboratoria

Mariana Costa Checa (born 20 March 1986) is a Peruvian businesswoman, the founder of the web development organization Laboratoria. She has received international recognition for her work in technological outreach to women with limited resources. In 2019, she was elected as the independent director of Engie Energy Peru.

== Early life and education ==
Mariana Costa Checa was born in Lima on 20 March 1986. From 2004 to 2007, she studied international relations at the London School of Economics. She subsequently obtained a master's degree in public administration from Columbia University.

== Laboratoria ==
While residing in the United States, Costa noticed that web development did not require special instruction, but rather that a large number of web developers were self-taught. When she returned to her native Peru, she noticed that almost no women were working in the field, which inspired her to create Laboratoria. The project's aim is to train poor women in skills related to webpage development.

The organization was founded in 2014, when Costa organized a pilot program for 15 young women, who received training in web development. Laboratoria ended 2015 with 130 women trained, and more than 300 new candidates.

Its funding sources include donations from Google, Telefónica, and the National Council of Science, Technology, and Technological Innovation of Peru. In addition, graduates from the program who get jobs as developers contribute a percentage of their salaries during their first two years.

== Recognition ==
In 2015, the Spanish edition of the MIT Technology Review named Costa to its list of Peru's innovators under 36.

She was one of 11 Latin American women among the BBC's 100 Women of 2016. During his presentation at that year's APEC Summit in Lima, Facebook founder Mark Zuckerberg highlighted the case of Laboratoria as an excellent initiative geared towards women in the region:

The women who go to Mariana's program were able to access the opportunities that the Internet provides. That is the future I want to build.

Barack Obama also had words of praise for Costa, stating that:

Now, when we were talking backstage, I had been reading about this, and I said, 60 percent of the women who have gone through this program now were employed. And I was corrected – it's now 70 percent. I had old data. But I think it's important to point out your success rate has been quite extraordinary already. So it's wonderful.

In 2018, she received a Business Leaders of Change award, presented by El Comercio, EY, and ASBANC.

For International Women's Day 2019, Mattel chose Costa as one of 20 women to have a Barbie doll based on them.
