= Nancy Birdsall =

Nancy Birdall was the founder and director of the Center for Global Development (CGD)

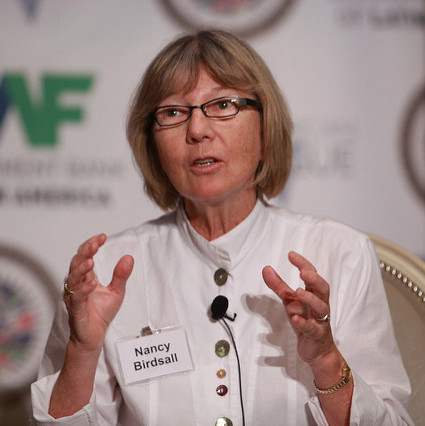
- Born: February 6, 1946 (age 79)
- Education: Boston College (BA); Johns Hopkins University (MA); Yale University (PhD)

Nancy Birdsall (born February 6, 1946) is an American economist, the founding president of the Center for Global Development (CGD) in Washington, DC, USA, and former executive vice-president of the Inter-American Development Bank.

She co-founded the Center for Global Development in November 2001 with C. Fred Bergsten and Edward W. Scott Jr. and served as president until 2016. Prior to becoming the President of CGD, Birdsall served for three years as Senior Associate and Director of the Economic Reform Project at the Carnegie Endowment for International Peace. Her work at Carnegie focused on issues of globalization and inequality, as well as the reform of the international financial institutions. During 1993 to 1998, she oversaw a $30 billion public and private loan portfolio at the Inter-American Development Bank, the largest of the regional development banks. Before joining the Inter-American Development Bank, Birdsall spent 14 years in research, policy, and management positions at the World Bank. Most recently she served as the director of the Policy Research Department.

Birdsall is the author, co-author, or editor of more than a dozen books and over 100 articles in scholarly journals and monographs, published in English and Spanish. Shorter pieces of her writing have appeared in dozens of U.S. and Latin American newspapers and periodicals.

Birdsall has been researching and writing about topics concerning economic development for more than 25 years. Her most recent work concentrates on the relationship between income distribution, economic growth, and the role of regional public goods in development.

== Education ==
In 1967, Birdsall graduated from Newton College of the Sacred Heart of Boston College with a B.A. in American Studies. Two years later, she received an M.A. in International Relations from the Paul H. Nitze School of Advanced International Studies of Johns Hopkins University, and a decade later, earned her PhD in Economics from Yale University.

== Career ==
Birdsall served for three years as Senior Associate and Director of the Economic Reform Project at the Carnegie Endowment for International Peace exploring issues of globalization, inequality, and the reform of international financial institutions.

In November 2001, Birdsall co-founded the Center for Global Development (CGD)—just two months after September 11 attacks on the United States. In a 2016 interview, she noted that the establishment of the CGD coincided "with a shift in thinking among US politicians" in which they began to accept the idea that nurturing stable and prosperous countries overseas, would result in "direct benefits" to the United States—an idea that underpinned the work of the CGD.

She acted as CGD president until 2016 and currently remains as Senior Fellow and President Emeritus.

A 2012 Washington Post article cited Birdsall, who called on the World Bank to develop a "larger and clearer mandate." She said that the wealthier developing nations should lead the World Bank's transformation into an institution that "could become the focal point for projects to cope with climate change or other major risks to the "global commons." If it failed to do so, it would "gradually become merely one of many aid agencies dealing with a smaller and smaller group of low-income fragile states."

== Publications ==
While at the World Bank, Birdsall was the principal author of a multitude of books and reports such as the World Development Report (1984), Population Change and Economic Development (1985), Population Growth and Policies in Sub-Saharan Africa (1986), Financing Health in Developing Countries: An Agenda for Reform (1987), Unfair Advantage: Labor Market Discrimination in Developing Countries (1991), and The East Asian Miracle: Economic Growth and Public Policy (1993).

In 2006, Birdsall published the online version of Rescuing the World Bank: A CGD Working Group Report and Selected Essays.

In 2011, she co-authored the Foreign Affairs article, "The Post-Washington Consensus: Development after the Crisis", with the author of The End of History—Francis Fukuyama—in which they predicted that the 2008 financial crisis marked the "end of American economic dominance in global affairs." They wrote that the November 2008 meeting of G20 heads of state—which unlike the G7—includes emerging BRIC countries. The inaugural 2008 meeting in Washington, D.C., in which the G20 coordinated a "global stimulus program", became an "established international institution."

Birdsall was the co-author of the 2014 Towards a Better Global Economy Policy Implications for Citizens Worldwide in the 21st Century, published by Oxford University Press. The book researched the factors that can lead to economic growth in low-, middle-, and high-income countries.
