= Plumtree Software =

Software company

- Founded: 1996; 30 years ago San Francisco, California, U.S.
- Founder: Glenn Kelman
- Defunct: October 20, 2005

Plumtree Software is a former software company founded in 1996 by product managers and engineers from Oracle and Informix with funding from Sequoia Capital. The company was a pioneer of extending the portal concept popularized by Yahoo! from the web to enterprise computing. BEA Systems acquired Plumtree on October 20, 2005, and Oracle subsequently acquired BEA. Plumtree's former portal product continues as part of Oracle's product line.

== Product history ==
=== Directory, portlets, communities ===
Plumtree can be used to deploy both Java and .NET portlets on the same page. The Plumtree Corporate Portal, Plumtree's flagship product, began as a Yahoo!-like directory for indexing and organizing content from file systems, websites, document databases, and groupware repositories, creating a rich knowledge management system for enterprise information. In 1999, the company introduced the idea of self-service personalization via portlets, originally termed "gadgets" by Plumtree, the modular services that users could assemble in their own portal pages. Portlets became prized for surfacing popular services from complex corporate systems to a broad audience. In 2000, Plumtree added features to support communities, which allowed users to build pages as workspaces for a team, resource centers for a business unit, service centers for customers or partners.

=== Radical openness ===
As the range of resources integrated within Plumtree's system grew, the company was forced to re-imagine the architecture of a Web application, using Internet protocols to go beyond a model limited to one type of application server or one language.

Internet protocols offered a new level of openness: rather than arguing over which application server or language was more open, Plumtree's system could support many application servers, many languages. Plumtree called this level of openness "radical openness."

Plumtree's experience with portlets taught the company that running all portal services locally, on the same application server as the portal, was impractical: local portlets were limited to one language and one application server, but every large organization supported more than one language and one type of application server.

Moreover, when the portlets ran on the same machine as the portal, each portlet could introduce faults or conflicts in the entire system. Whenever a portlet failed, the portal could fail, and identifying the fault involved removing portlets from the portal one portlet at a time.

In 2000, Plumtree overhauled its portal to communicate with components via HTTP. As a result, components could run anywhere, and be coded in any language. When a component failed, the remainder of the system was unaffected, just as the World Wide Web is unaffected when a Web site fails. This allowed Plumtree to develop a reliable system that incorporated services from across the enterprise.

=== The parallel engine ===
Plumtree's HTTP-based architecture created serious performance challenges, as each portal page now depended on components running on other platforms. Previously, no other system had used Internet protocols to distribute one system's processing to many components. Application server libraries for opening HTTP connections were unacceptably slow, and unable to handle the number of connections that a large portal deployment would require.

In 2000, Plumtree created a new layer of software infrastructure known as the parallel engine, designed for high-speed, large-scale communications via Internet protocols. The result: in third-party tests, the portal maintained a high level of performance even as the number of services it integrated increased; increasing the number of services integrated by an order of magnitude decreased performance by only a tenth of a second.

=== UNIX support ===
Plumtree's Web Services Architecture allowed portal services to be developed in any language, and hosted on any platform, but the portal itself ran only on Windows. As Plumtree's business matured, it became necessary to support more platforms.

In 2001, Plumtree released the first version of its portal software designed to run on UNIX operating systems, with a Java programming interface and a Java user interface. Because of its Web Services Architecture, all the services developed for the Windows portal could also connect via HTTP to the UNIX portal.

Plumtree's stated goal at the time was to become the only provider of Web technology with Microsoft- and Java-oriented solutions.

=== Web services standards ===
In 2002, Plumtree extended the Web Services Architecture of its Windows and UNIX products, to support remote components for indexing content from different repositories, federating searches to different search engines, authenticating users against different directories and profiling users' interests and preferences from different systems, all with the same level of radical openness to application servers and programming languages.

To ensure that these components could share information about the user and his portal context, the portal later featured its own Web services programming interface.

=== Developer support ===
Having redesigned its system to rely on Web services for integrating content, search, users and user attributes, Plumtree in 2002 was one of the first vendors to recognize the practical difficulties of ensuring that Web services developed in different environments actually worked together.

In 2003, Plumtree released a developer kit that complemented Java and .NET development environments to ensure that both environments generated Web services interoperable with one another.

The kit, known as the EDK (Enterprise Development Kit) allowed Java and .NET developers alike to build a Web service as if the service were a native object, with Plumtree providing code to ensure the Web service could communicate with other Web services from other environments in an open, efficient way.

=== The Enterprise Web ===
In early 2001, Plumtree began to expand its product portfolio, creating an integrated set of technologies that Gartner later referred to as the "Smart Enterprise Suite." In 2001, Plumtree acquired RipFire for search, Hablador for Web content management, ActiveSpace for Web forms and data publishing, and began developing its own collaboration engine. After a year of integration, Plumtree shipped these technologies as Plumtree Collaboration Server, Plumtree Content Server, Plumtree Search Server and Plumtree Studio Server, all using the portal's security, administration and user interface capabilities.

On the strength of these products, Plumtree extended its charter, from a single portal product to what it called the Enterprise Web. Plumtree described the Enterprise Web as a set of technologies for managing all the informational sites and Web applications in the enterprise as elements of one environment rather than as separate entities. Unfortunately, much was slideware in the early days. Many customers were left with only minimally functional portals, due to the reliance on downloading what was then considered very large amounts of JavaScript to the client.

== Initial Public Offering (IPO) ==
Plumtree debuted on the Nasdaq on June 4, 2002 under the stock symbol PLUM raising $42.5 million.

== Acquisition ==
Although, as an independent company Plumtree, was a prevailing leader in the portal market according to Gartner Group, it was acquired by BEA Systems in October 2005. Its products were then marketed and re-branded under the BEA Aqualogic brand. In April 2008, Oracle acquired BEA Systems and integrated Aqualogic into the Oracle Web Center
