= William T. Coleman III =

American businessman (1947–2020)

William T. Coleman III (October 16, 1947 – November 29, 2020) was an American businessman who was the CEO of Veritas Technologies. He was also a partner at Alsop Louie Partners. He was the founder, chairman of the board and chief executive officer of various high-profile corporations, including BEA Systems and Cassatt Corporation, and had been a director at Symantec Corporation since 2003.

== Early life and education ==
Coleman was born on October 16, 1947. He had a bachelor's degree in computer science from the United States Air Force Academy and master's degrees in computer science and computer engineering from Stanford University. He was awarded an honorary doctorate from the University of Colorado.

== Career ==
Coleman began his career in the United States Air Force as Chief of Satellite Operations in the Office of the Secretary of the Air Force. In 1995, he co-founded BEA Systems, where he was chairman of the board. Coleman and two others started BEA to create software tools that tie corporate software applications together. The company was an enterprise application and service infrastructure software provider. In 2001, Business Week Online valued his stake in BEA Systems at $500 million. Coleman's tenure as chairman of the board lasted until August 2002. Concurrently, he was also chief strategy officer from October 2001 until August 2002, and chief executive officer from 1995 to October 2001.

Before co-founding BEA Systems, Coleman was the head of Sun Microsystems' professional services and software development units, and co-founded Dest Systems, where he then headed engineering. Coleman also held positions as a director of product development at VisiCorp and manager of the High Frequency Systems Group at GTE Sylvania. Starting in June 2010, he had been an operating partner of Alsop Louie Partners, a venture fund that invests primarily in early-stage technology.

Coleman had been a director of Symantec Corp. from January 14, 2003. He was a member of the Trilateral Commission, and a member of the audit committee. He was a member of the Information Technology Advisory Board at Warburg Pincus. Additionally, he was a member of the board of directors of Nexant, Inc, and on the board of directors and advisory council of the Business Executives for National Security. He was previously a director of a variety of companies, including Cassatt Corporation and Palm, Inc.

=== Alsop Louie Partners ===
Since December 2010, Coleman was an operating partner at Alsop Louie Partners, a venture fund that invests primarily in early-stage technology.

=== Cassatt Corporation ===
Coleman was the founder, chairman of the board and chief executive officer of Cassatt Corporation from August 2003 until June 2009. Prior to its 2010 acquisition by CA, Inc., the Menlo Park, California-based company offered "software and services to help enterprises implement agile business architectures which adapt to meet changing workplace requirements". The company was funded by Warburg Pincus LLP, a global private equity firm. The Cassatt management team included Coleman, Brian Berliner, Mark Forman, Paul Hoffman, Dave McAllister, Steven Oberlin and Karen Willem.

=== Veritas Technologies ===
The Carlyle Group struck the largest IT buyout deal of 2015 to acquire the data backup and information management group Veritas Technologies from IT security giant Symantec in August of that year. The deal was completed in January 2016 with Bill Coleman appointed by Carlyle Group as the new CEO of the company.

== Death ==
Coleman died from pancreatic cancer on November 29, 2020, at the age of 73.

== Honors ==
In 2010, Coleman was listed as 827th on the Forbes Global 2000, which he had been on each year since 2003. In 2009, he was listed in Forbes 400 Best Big Companies, which he had been on consecutively from 2003 to 2005. Other lists he has been on as director of Symantec Corporation include

- 2004: Named in the Asian Fab 50
- 2003: 397th on the Forbes 500s (Profits), Listed in the Asian Fab 50, 259th on the Forbes 500s (Market Value) list
- 2002: Named in the Forbes 500s (Market Value) list
- 2001: 733rd on the Forbes Executive Pay list

Other recognitions include:

- In 2001, he was named Entrepreneur of the Year by both Ernst & Young and the Robert H. and Beverly A. Deming Center for Entrepreneurship at Colorado University, Boulder.
- Named by Business Week as one of 2001's E-biz 25 Top Executives.

== Philanthropy ==
Coleman's philanthropic focus was to take a local and hands-on approach to giving back to society, inspired by his niece's cognitive disability. Having seen her cognitive abilities improve with the advent of technology and the computer, he and his wife decided to focus specifically on finding treatments for cognitive disabilities with technology. In 2000, Coleman and his wife initiated a long-term partnership with the University of Colorado, with their donations going towards the construction of the Coleman Institute for Cognitive Disabilities. Coleman was the president of the University of Colorado Boulder's Coleman Institute for Cognitive Disabilities.

Coleman and his wife created the Coleman-Turner Chair in Cognitive Disability. Since its institution, David Braddock, PhD, Associate Vice President of the University of Colorado, has acted as executive director for the chair.

=== The Coleman Institute ===
The Coleman Institute for Cognitive Disabilities was established in 2001, and dedicates its advanced development and research capacities towards the improvement of the afflicted, and exists solely to catalyse and integrate advances in science, engineering and technology to promote the quality of life and independent living of those with cognitive disabilities. Their original endowment towards the institute was a sum of $250 million, and they have continued their donations towards the annually to further its programs and research projects.
