= Jeffrey McClanahan =

American novelist

- Born: Texas, United States
- Occupations: Novelist; real estate professional; retailer
- Writing career
- Pen name: Sadie Callahan, Dixie Cash, and Anna Jeffrey
- Website: annajeffrey.com

Jeffrey McClanahan is an American novelist from Texas who writes with her sister, Pam Cumbie, under the joint pen name of Dixie Cash. McClanahan is also an author of six western romance novels under the name of Anna Jeffrey. For her 2009 novel, McClanahan has taken on a third pseudonym, Sadie Callahan.

== Personal life ==
McClanahan grew up in West Texas during the oil boom. Pam and Jeffrey are a writing team who focus on humor. Their work is mainly influenced by their interest in country-western music and culture. They collaborate to write comedic stories and scripts.

Jeffery lives with her husband, in “a small town not far from Fort Worth,” Texas and worked as “both a real estate professional and a retailer for most of her adult life, also professions that beg for a sense of humor.”

Cumbie asserts that McClanahan “loves books... like I love earrings and anything liquid that contains liquor. Her home looks like a library. She writes beautiful prose and steamy sex, and then I come along and junk it up with trash."

== Writing process ==
Glenn Dromgoole writes that “Cumbie makes up the stories and characters…then McClanahan edits and rewrites.” Cumbie explains that the sisters send pages back and forth between them as they work on a novel.

== Major publications ==
=== Works co-authored with sister as “Dixie Cash” ===
- Since You're Leaving Anyway, Take Out the Trash (2004)
- My Heart May Be Broken, But My Hair Still Looks Great (2005)
- I Gave You My Heart, But You Sold It Online (2007)
- Don't Make Me Choose Between You and My Shoes (2008)
- Curing the Blues with a New Pair of Shoes (2009)
- Our Red Hot Romance is Leaving Me Blue (2010)
- I Can't Make You Love Me, but I Can Make You Leave (2011)
- You Can Have My Heart, but Don't Touch My Dog (2016)

=== Works authored as “Anna Jefrey” ===
- The Love of a Cowboy (2003)
- The Love of a Stranger (2004)
- The Love of a Lawman (2005)
- Sweet Water (2005)
- Salvation, Texas (2007)
- Sweet Return (2007)
- Lone Star Woman (written originally as Sadie Callahan, re-released by Anna Jeffrey)
- Man of the West (written originally as Sadie Callahan)
- The Tycoon, Book #1, Sons of Texas trilogy (2012)
- Desired (2013)
- The Cattleman, Book #2, Sons of Texas trilogy

=== Works authored as "Sadie Callahan" ===
- Lone Star Woman (2009)
- Man of the West (2010)

== Critical reception and awards ==
Affaire de Coeur, Medwest Book Review, All About Romance, and Romance Reade at Heart, for example, have all praised Salvation, Texas, calling it "A first-class Romantic suspense tale," a "fine thriller," "a treat to read a good book set in Texas that really felt authentic," and "A good solid read, with great characters and a fast paced plot," respectively. Another reviewer, declared, "This book is like “Dallas” crossed with a police procedural. We’ve got wealth, we’ve got crime, we’ve got greed and we’ve got hot sex. And all the men wear cowboy hats. I like view of small town Texas life where everybody knows just about everything about each other and everybody lives for Friday night high school football and weekend rodeos." Marilyn Weigel writes, "Readers, however, will delight in the scene-setting descriptions, where the prose is especially vivid and enjoyable." One other reviewer graded the book as a B+.

Sweet Water by Anna Jeffrey won a number of awards, including Golden Quill Contest Finalist, Single Title Contemporary, 2007; More Than Magic Contest Finalist, Romance Writers Ink, Single Title Contemporary, 2007; Desert Rose Finalist, Single Title Contemporary, 2007; and Write Touch Readers Award Winner, Single Title Contemporary, 2007. Sweet Return won a similar number of awards, including Award of Excellence Contest Finalist, Colorado Romance Writers, Single Title Contemporary, 2008; Gayle Wilson Award of Excellence Contest Finalist, Single Title Contemporary, 2008; More Than Magic Contest Winner, Romance Writers Ink, Single Title Contemporary, 2008; and Aspen Gold Winner, Single Title Contemporary, 2008.
