= Peter van der Linden =

American technologist and author (born 1963)

Peter van der Linden (born 1963) is an American technologist and author. He has worked for companies such as Sun Microsystems and Apple Computer, and has written books on Java, C, Linux, and practical jokes. He is currently (2021) a Technology Consultant in Silicon Valley.
