= Michael Clemens =

American economist

Michael A. Clemens
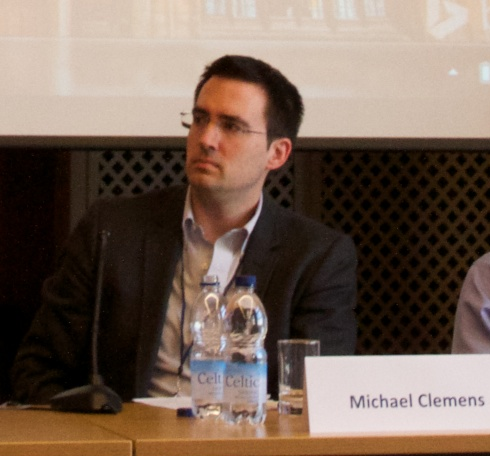
- Occupation: Economist

Academic background
- Education: California Institute of Technology (B.S.); Johns Hopkins University (M.S.); Harvard University (Ph.D.)
- Doctoral advisor: Jeffrey G. Williamson
- Influences: Lant Pritchett; Michael Kremer; Jeffrey G. Williamson; William Easterly; Alynn Young

Academic work
- Discipline: International migration, economic development, economic history
- Institutions: George Mason University and Peterson Institute for International Economics
- Awards: Royal Economic Society Prize
- Website: http://mclem.org; Information at IDEAS / RePEc

Michael Andrew Clemens (born 1972) is an American economist who studies international migration and global economic development.

He is a full professor in the Department of Economics at George Mason University and a non-resident senior fellow at the Peterson Institute for International Economics. He is also affiliated with IZA, the Institute of Labor Economics in Bonn, Germany, the Centre for Research and Analysis of Migration at University College London, and is a Distinguished Non-Resident Fellow at the Center for Global Development.

== Research ==
Clemens' recent work focuses on the effects of international migration on people in their countries of destination, on people in their countries of origin, and on migrants themselves. One of his most-cited works on migration is Economics and Emigration: Trillion-Dollar Bills on the Sidewalk published in the Journal of Economic Perspectives in 2011. In this paper, he investigates why economists spend much more time studying the movement of goods and capital and much less time studying the movement of people. He sketches a four-point research agenda on the effects of emigration. He has also studied the effects on the US labor market from the exclusion of Mexican bracero farmworkers at the end of 1964.

Clemens has also written about aid effectiveness, including an article for the Journal of Development Effectiveness: "When does rigorous impact evaluation make a difference? The case of the Millennium Villages." Using a high-profile case, the Millennium Villages Project, an experimental and intensive package intervention to spark economic development in rural Africa, he and his co-authors illustrate the benefits of rigorous impact evaluation by showing the estimates of the project's effects depend heavily in evaluation method. He also wrote Counting Chickens When They Hatch: Timing and the Effects of Aid on Growth for the Royal Economic Society's Economic Journal, examining the cross-country relationship between foreign aid and economic growth.

== Initiatives ==
Clemens conceived the idea of Global Skill Partnerships (GSPs), proposing them for the first time at the Global Economic Symposium in Rio de Janeiro in 2012. GSPs are a novel type of agreement between two countries to regulate the migration of skilled workers between them with benefits shared by both countries, endorsed by 154 countries in the Global Compact for Migration. Following the 2010 Haiti earthquake, Clemens led an effort to make Haitians eligible for H-2A and H-2B low-skill temporary work visa program arguing that the economic impact of migration would be far more beneficial than any foreign assistance or aid to the country.
