= Lima Chamber of Commerce =

Business network in Lima, Peru

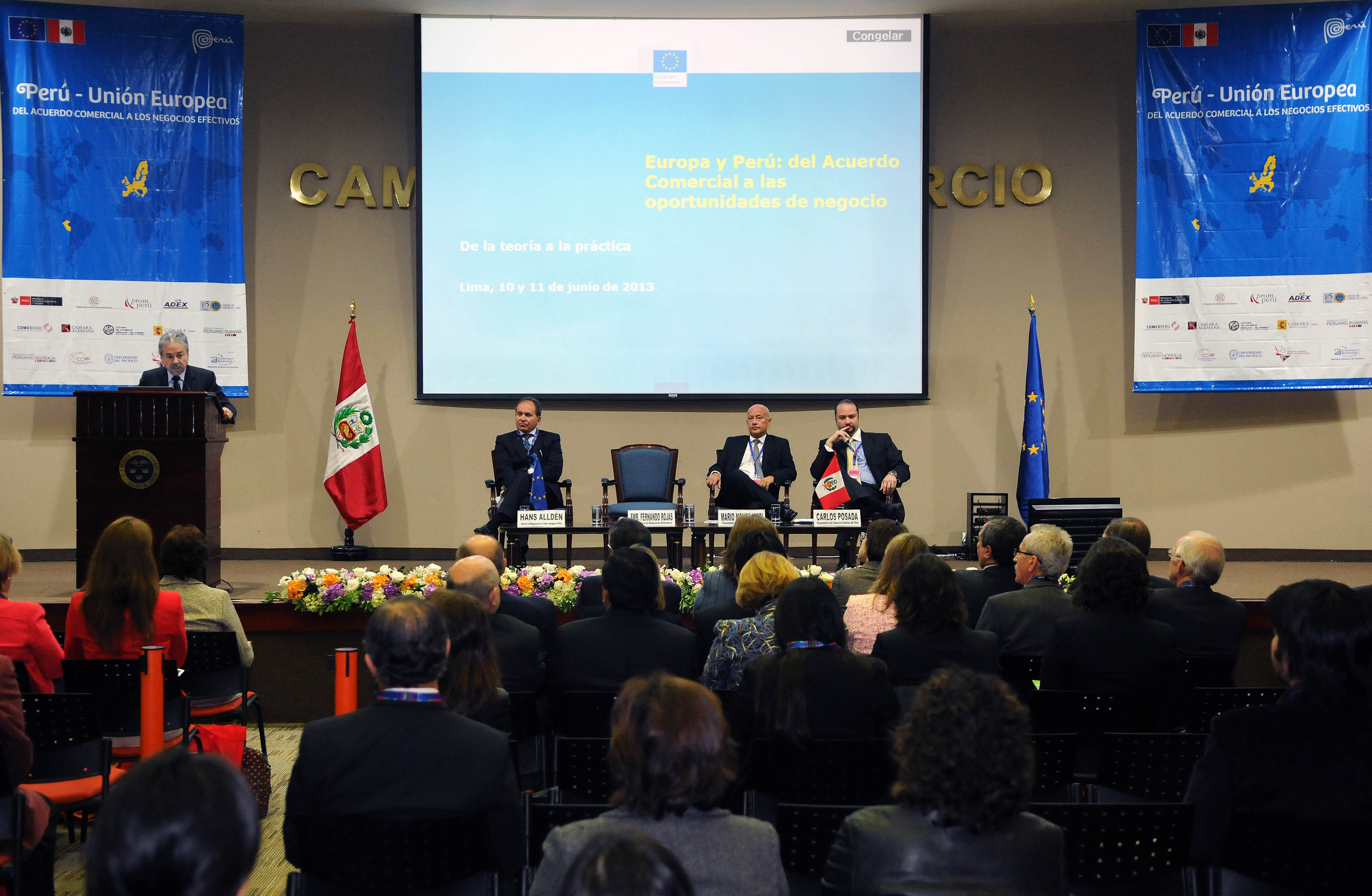
- Founded: 1888; 138 years ago
- Type: Chamber of commerce
- Purpose: Commerce and trade
- Location: Jesús María District, Lima, Peru
- Region served: Lima
- Website: camaralima.org.pe

Lima Chamber of Commerce (Spanish: Cámara de Comercio de Lima; CCL) is a non-profit business organisation in Lima, Peru. The chamber of commerce is headquartered at Giuseppe Garibaldi 396, in Jesús María District, Lima.

== History ==
The chamber of commerce was established on April 20, 1888, in the aftermath of the War of the Pacific. Its first president was politician Pedro Correa y Santiago.

== Leadership ==
The CCL is headed by a president. As of 2026, its current officeholder is Roberto de la Tore Aguayo.

№	Mayor	Term	
№	Mayor	Begin	End
1	Pedro Correa y Santiago	1888	1892
2	Enrique Ayulo	1892	1893
3	Enrique Barreda	1893	1895
4	J. Luis Dubois	1895	1896
5	Manuel Candamo	1896	1903
6	Ernesto Ayulo	1903	1907
7	Felipe Barreda	1907	1908
8	Pedro Gallagher	1908	1929
9	Pablo La Rosa	1929	1930
10	Enrique Ferreyros	1930	1932
11	Augusto Wiesse	1932	1934
12	Gustavo Berckemeyer	1934	1936
13	Fernando Wiesse	1936	1946
14	Luis Berckemeyer	1946	1948
15	Carlos Ferreyros	1948	1951
16	Carlos García	1951	1954
17	Eduardo Dibós	1954	1957
18	Luis Berckemeyer	1957	1958
19	Guillermo Crosby	1958	1961
20	Germán Aguirre	1961	1964
21	Lionel Derteano	1964	1967
22	Enrique Novak	1967	1970
23	Gabriel Tudela	1970	1972
24	Juan Lira	1972	1973
25	Gustavo Eguren	1973	1976
26	Adolfo Dammert	1976	1977
27	Augusto Ramos	1977	1981
28	Claudio Pizarro	1981	1982
29	Augusto Wiesse	1982	1984
30	Eduardo Iriarte	1984	1986
31	Rafael Villegas	1986	1988
32	Ramón Remolina Serrano	1988	1990
33	Juan Lira	1990	1992
34	Samuel Gleiser Katz	1992	1994
35	Juan Musso	1994	1996
36	Hugo Sologuren	1996	1998
37	Manuel Celi	1998	2000
38	Samuel Gleiser Katz	2000	2002
39	Javier Aida Susuki	2002	2004
40	Graciela Fernández-Baca de Valdéz	2004	2006
41	Samuel Gleiser Katz	2006	2008
42	Peter Anders Moores	2008	2010
43	Carlos Durand Chahud	2010	2012
43	Samuel Gleiser Katz	2012	2014
44	Jorge von Wedemeyer	2014	2016
45	Mario Mongilardi Fuchs	2016	2018
46	Yolanda Torriani	2018	2020
47	Peter Anders Moores	2020	2022
48	Rosa Bueno de Lercari	2022	2024
49	Roberto de La Tore Aguayo	2025	Incumbent

== See also ==
- Lima Stock Exchange
