= Craig McClanahan =

American computer programmer

Craig R. McClanahan
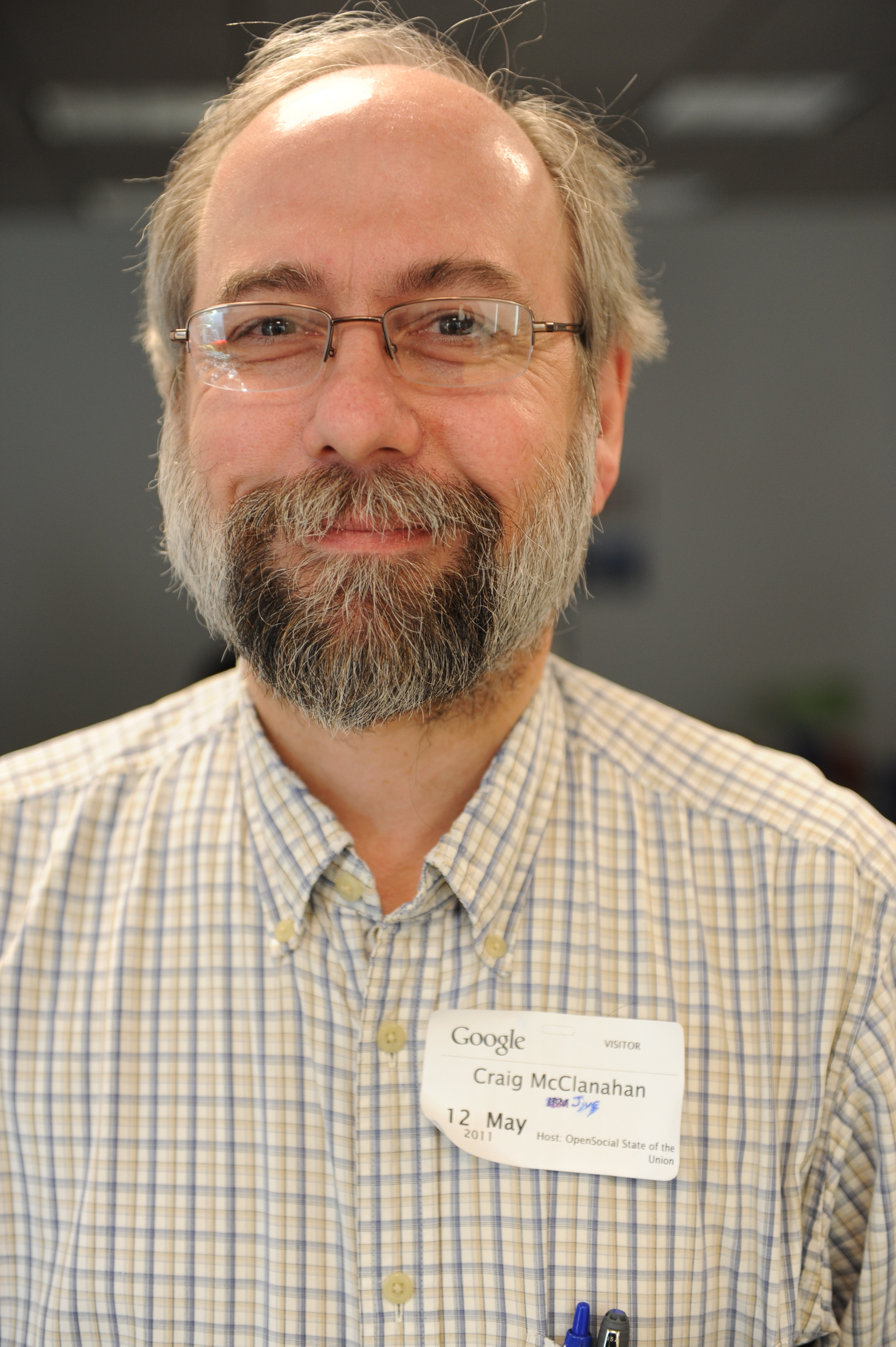
- Born: April 18, 1953 (age 71)

Craig R. McClanahan (born 18 April 1953) is a programmer and original author of the Apache Struts framework for building web applications. He was part of the expert group that defined the servlet 2.2, 2.3 and JSP 1.1, 1.2 specifications. He is also the architect of Tomcat's servlet container Catalina.
