= Todd Greanier =

American computer scientist

Todd Greanier is an author and technology manager, regarded as an expert in Java programming.

Greanier now works to develop and deliver complex applications utilizing public records data. He was a frequent contributor to the now defunct New York Sun newspaper, and was co-author (with sportswriter Sean Lahman) of three books on professional football.

Todd published his first book of poetry, Despising Van Gogh, in February 2011.
