= Alfred Chuang =

American businessman

- 莊思浩
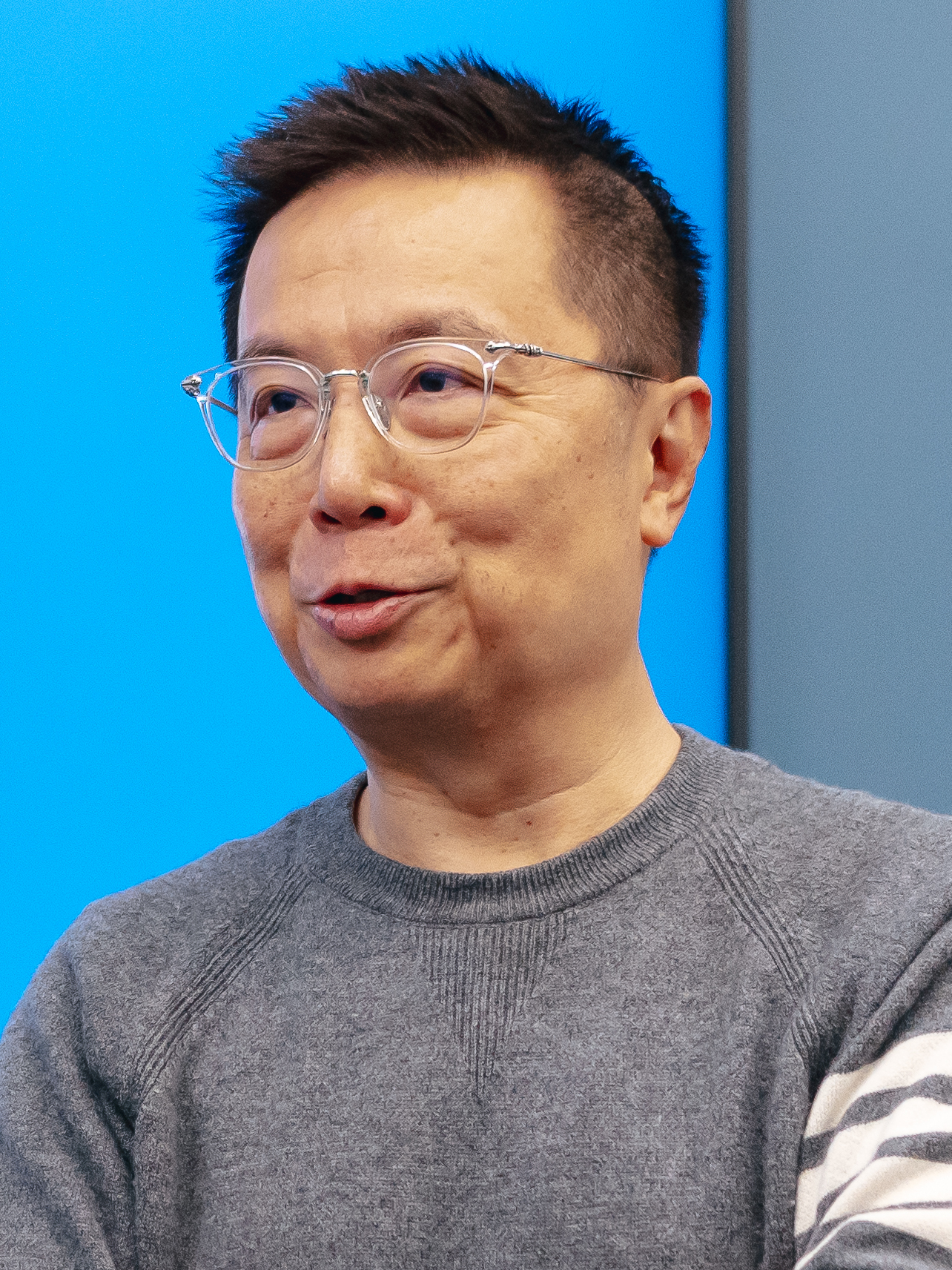
- Chuang in 2023
- Born: Alfred Sze Ho Chuang; Hong Kong
- Education: University of San Francisco (BS); University of California, Davis (MS)
- Occupation: General partner of Race Capital
- Known for: BEA Systems (Chairman, CEO and founder), Magnet Systems (Chairman)

Alfred S. Chuang (simplified Chinese: 庄思浩; traditional Chinese: 莊思浩) is an American business technology executive and venture capitalist. He is the former CEO of BEA Systems. In 2020, he founded Race Capital, a venture fund.

== Early life and education ==
A native of Hong Kong, Chuang graduated from Wah Yan College, Hong Kong, a Roman Catholic all-boys secondary school.

Chuang received a B.S. in computer science from the University of San Francisco and a master's degree in computer science with a specialization in distributed data management from the University of California, Davis. Chuang authored a graduate thesis, "Table-Tabular Data Objects and their Use in Table Editing", concerning relational database development.

== Career ==
After receiving his graduate degree from UC Davis, Chuang worked for Sun Microsystems from 1986 to 1994. In early 1995 he co-founded BEA Systems, Inc. and later served as its chairman, CEO, President, CTO and Executive Vice President (EVP) of Worldwide Operations, until it was acquired by Oracle in April 2008 for $8.6 billion.

Since 2008, Chuang has been the founder and CEO of a mobile app server startup called Magnet Systems, Inc. On April 27, 2011, Magnet Systems, Inc. received $12.6 million of financing in their Series A round from investment firm Andreessen Horowitz. In August 2012, Magnet received an extra $47 million in Series B funding from HTC and Andreessen Horowitz.

In 2020 he co-founded Race Capital, a venture fund, and became its general partner.
