= Lant Pritchett =

American economist

- Born: 1959 (age 66–67); Utah, U.S.
- Education: Brigham Young University (B.S.); Massachusetts Institute of Technology (Ph.D)
- Occupation: Development Economist
- Notable work: Pritchett Test

Lant Pritchett (born 1959) is an American development economist. He was Research Director of the RISE Programme at the Blavatnik School of Government, University of Oxford, until March 2023, and is a Visiting Professor of Practice at the School of Public Policy at the London School of Economics. He is co-founder and Research Director of Labor Mobility Partnerships (LaMP).

== Early life and education ==
Pritchett is from Idaho. He graduated from Brigham Young University in 1983 with a B.S. in economics and received a PhD in economics from the Massachusetts Institute of Technology in 1988.

== Career ==
Pritchett worked for the World Bank from 1988 to 2007, living in Indonesia from 1998 to 2000 and in India from 2004 to 2007. He was part of the teams that produced the World Development Reports of 1994 and 2004. In 1998 he co-authored with David Dollar the report Assessing Aid, which has been credited with influencing the creation of the Millennium Challenge Corporation.

Pritchett has said that he wrote the 1991 Summers memo, which circulated under the name of World Bank chief economist Lawrence Summers and appeared to advocate exporting polluting industries to poor countries. He has said that the passage was meant ironically and that the leaked version was altered to remove its context.

He taught at the Harvard Kennedy School from 2000 to 2019 and was intermittently faculty chair of its MPA/ID degree program. He was also a senior fellow at the Center for Global Development.

In 2006 he published ''Let Their People Come: Breaking the Gridlock on Global Labor Mobility'' (Center for Global Development). In it he argues that the most effective way the developed world can help impoverished countries is to allow increased numbers of low-skilled laborers to immigrate as Guest worker program|guest workers. He co-founded Labor Mobility Partnerships (LaMP), an organization focused on creating opportunities for labor mobility among workers with core skills.

== Research ==
His book ''The Rebirth of Education: Schooling Ain't Learning'' was published by the Center for Global Development in 2013. He co-authored ''Building State Capability: Evidence, Analysis, Action'' (2017). The concept of "isomorphic mimicry" describes how some governments adopt the appearance of effective institutions without achieving their intended functions.

His proposal to monitor global poverty with a low and a high poverty line has been adopted by some organizations, including Our World in Data.

== Selected works ==
- The Rebirth of Education: Schooling Ain't Learning (2013).
- Building State Capability: Evidence, Analysis, Action (2017).
- Divergence, Big Time (1997).

== Pritchett test ==
Pritchett proposed a four-part "smell test" for pro-development policies. The economist Paul Romer summarizes the four criteria, using X as the variable targeted by policy:

- In a cross-sectional comparison of levels, do countries that are more developed have more X?
- In cross-sectional comparison of growth rates, do countries that have rapid growth in X also tend to experience a rapid increase in standards of living?
- When we look at the few countries for which we have long historical records, do the ones that become much more developed also acquire much more X?
- If we look for countries that switch from a regime of slow economic development to a regime of rapid development, do we see a parallel shift in the rate of growth of change in X?

Pritchett uses this four-part test to critique the relevance and usefulness of the current trend in development economics of using randomized controlled trials.
