= BEA Systems =

Defunct American software corporation

BEA Systems, Inc.
- Type: Public
- Traded as: Nasdaq: BEAS
- Industry: Software Company
- Founded: 1995; 31 years ago
- Founder: Bill Coleman; Ed Scott; Alfred Chuang
- Defunct: April 29, 2008; 18 years ago
- Fate: Acquired by Oracle Corporation
- Headquarters: San Jose, California, United States
- Products: Tuxedo, WebLogic, AquaLogic
- Revenue: ▲US$1.535 billion (2008)
- Net income: ▲US$208.2 million (2008)
- Website: Oracle and BEA

BEA Systems, Inc. was a company that specialized in enterprise infrastructure software products, which was wholly acquired by Oracle Corporation on April 29, 2008.

== History ==
BEA began as a software company, founded in 1995 and headquartered in San Jose, California. It grew to have 78 offices worldwide at the time of its acquisition by Oracle.

The company's name is an initialism of the first names of the company's three founders: Bill Coleman, Ed Scott, and Alfred Chuang. All were former employees of Sun Microsystems and launched the business in 1995 by acquiring Information Management and Independence Technologies. These firms were the largest resellers of Tuxedo, a distributed transaction management system sold by Novell. BEA soon acquired the Tuxedo product itself and went on to acquire other middleware companies and products.

In 1998, BEA acquired the San Francisco start-up WebLogic, which had built the first standards-based Java application server. WebLogic's application server became the impetus for the Sun Microsystems' J2EE specification and formed the basis of BEA's WebLogic application server sold today.

They were a sponsor for Team Rahal (now Rahal Letterman Lanigan Racing) from 2002 to 2008, which included Buddy Rice's 2004 Indianapolis 500 win and Vitor Meira's 2005 Indianapolis 500 runner-up finish.

In 2005, BEA launched a new brand identity with the slogan "Think Liquid.". BEA also announced a new product line called AquaLogic, which is an infrastructure software family for service-oriented architecture (SOA). The same year, it made its entrance into telecommunications infrastructure through the acquisition of Incomit, a Swedish telecommunications software provider. In late 2005, the company announced the acquisitions of Compoze Software, a provider of collaboration software, M7, an Eclipse-based tools company, and SolarMetric, editors of the Kodo persistence engine.

The acquisitions continued in 2006 with Plumtree Software, an enterprise portal company; Fuego, a business process management (BPM) software company; and Flashline, a metadata repository company. These acquisitions have since become parts of the AquaLogic SOA product stack.

On October 12, 2007, Oracle announced its intent to buy BEA Systems for $6.7 billion. As a result of the offer, BEA's stock price rose over five dollars upon the opening of trading for the day. BEA turned the offer down the same day, saying that the company is "worth substantially more". On January 16, 2008, Oracle signed a definite agreement to buy BEA for $8.5 billion. It is believed that Carl Icahn, one of the company's most prominent shareholders, was the main reason that the deal happened.

On April 29, 2008, Oracle completed its acquisition of BEA.

== Products ==
BEA had three major product lines:

1. Tuxedo, now Oracle Tuxedo – transaction-oriented middleware platform
2. BEA WebLogic, now Oracle WebLogic Server – Java EE enterprise infrastructure platform
3. AquaLogic, now Oracle Service Bus – service-oriented architecture (SOA) platform

BEA started out with the Tuxedo software product, but currently the products it is best known for in the computer industry are the WebLogic product family, which consists of WebLogic Server, WebLogic Workshop, WebLogic Portal, WebLogic Integration, and JRockit. In 2005, BEA launched a new product family called AquaLogic for service-oriented architecture deployment. It has also entered the telecommunications field with its WebLogic Communications Platform, which includes WebLogic SIP Server and WebLogic Network Gatekeeper, technologies obtained through the acquisition of Swedish telecommunications software company Incomit. BEA also has a product offering for the RFID market called the BEA WebLogic RFID Product Family.

=== AquaLogic ===
BEA Systems produced the AquaLogic software suite for managing service-oriented architecture (SOA). It includes following products:

- BEA AquaLogic BPM suite, a set of business process management (BPM) tools. It combines workflow and process technology with enterprise application integration functionality. The suite consists of tools aimed for line of business personnel for creating business process models (AquaLogic BPM Designer), as well as tools for IT personnel to create actual business process applications directly from said models (AquaLogic BPM Studio). The completed business process applications are deployed on a production server (AquaLogic BPM Enterprise Server), from which they integrate to backend applications and generate portal views for human interactions in the process. It also comes with a customizable tools for live business activity monitoring (BAM).
- BEA AquaLogic User Interaction, a set of tools used to create portals, collaborative communities composite applications and other applications that use service architecture. These technologies work cross-platform. This technology came to BEA Systems from its acquisition of Plumtree Software.
- BEA AquaLogic Enterprise Repository, a vital element of effective Service-oriented architecture life cycle governance, manages the metadata for any type of software asset, from business processes and web services to patterns, frameworks, applications, and components. It maps the relationships and interdependencies that connect these assets to improve impact analysis, promote and systematize code reuse, and measure the impact on the bottom line.
- BEA AquaLogic Service Bus, an enterprise service bus (ESB) with operational service-management that allows the interaction between services, routing relationships, transformations, and policies.
- BEA AquaLogic Service Registry, a UDDI v3 registry with an embedded governance framework. It provides a repository where services can be registered and reused for developing or modifying applications.
- BEA AquaLogic Data Services Platform (previously known as Liquid Data), providing tools for creating and managing different data services. It uses the XQuery language for data composition and transformation for a variety of data sources, including relational databases and web services.
- BEA AquaLogic Enterprise Security, a security infrastructure application for distributed authentication, fine-grained entitlements and other security services. Features include allowing users to define access rules for applications without modifying the software itself, including JSP pages, EJBs, and portlets.
- BEA AquaLogic Commerce Services (often shortened as ALCS), an e-Commerce solution based on Elastic Path e-Commerce solution integrated with WebLogic application server. Discontinued on version 6.0 in 2009, a year after acquisition by Oracle.

== See also ==
- List of acquisitions by Oracle
