= Official scorer (baseball) =

Recorder of official events in a baseball game

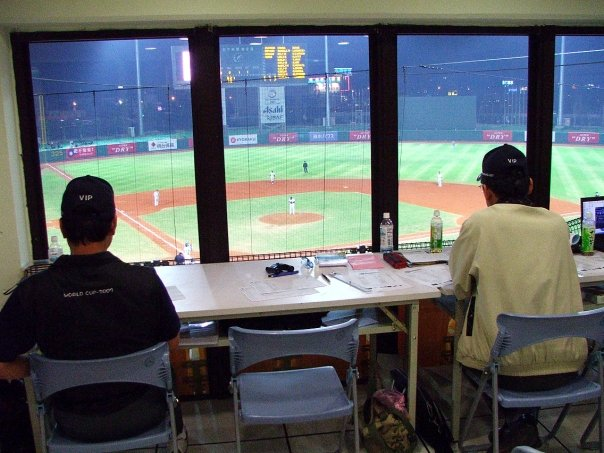
Booth of the official scorer in Taichung Intercontinental Baseball Stadium (Taiwan)

In the game of baseball, the official scorer is a person appointed by the league to record the events on the field, and to send the official scoring record of the game back to the league offices. In addition to recording the events on the field such as the outcome of each plate appearance and the circumstances of any baserunner's advance around the bases, the official scorer is also charged with making judgment calls that do not affect the progress or outcome of the game. Judgment calls are primarily made about errors, unearned runs, fielder's choice, the value of hits in certain situations, and wild pitches, all of which are included in the record compiled. This record is used to compile statistics for each player and team. A box score is a summary of the official scorer's game record.

Newspaper writers initially performed this function in the early days of Major League Baseball (MLB). As the importance of baseball player statistics increased, teams began to pressure writer-scorers for favorable scoring decisions for their players in games played at home stadiums, and a home team scoring bias was perceived by many coaches, players, and writers. Controversies related to perceived bias or errors in scoring have led to questions about important baseball records, including several no-hitters and Joe DiMaggio's 56-game hitting streak of 1941. By 1979, many major newspapers decided to ban their writers from scoring baseball games due to conflict-of-interest concerns, and in 1980 MLB began to hire independent official scorers.

Since 1980, some reforms have been suggested to improve the performance of official scorers. In 2001, MLB formed a scoring committee to review their performance, and by 2008 the committee was given the authority to overturn scoring decisions. This authority was used by the scoring committee three times during the 2009 season. In 2006, an academic study seemed to confirm the historical existence of a home-team bias in scoring decisions, but this measurable bias decreased after 1979.

== History ==
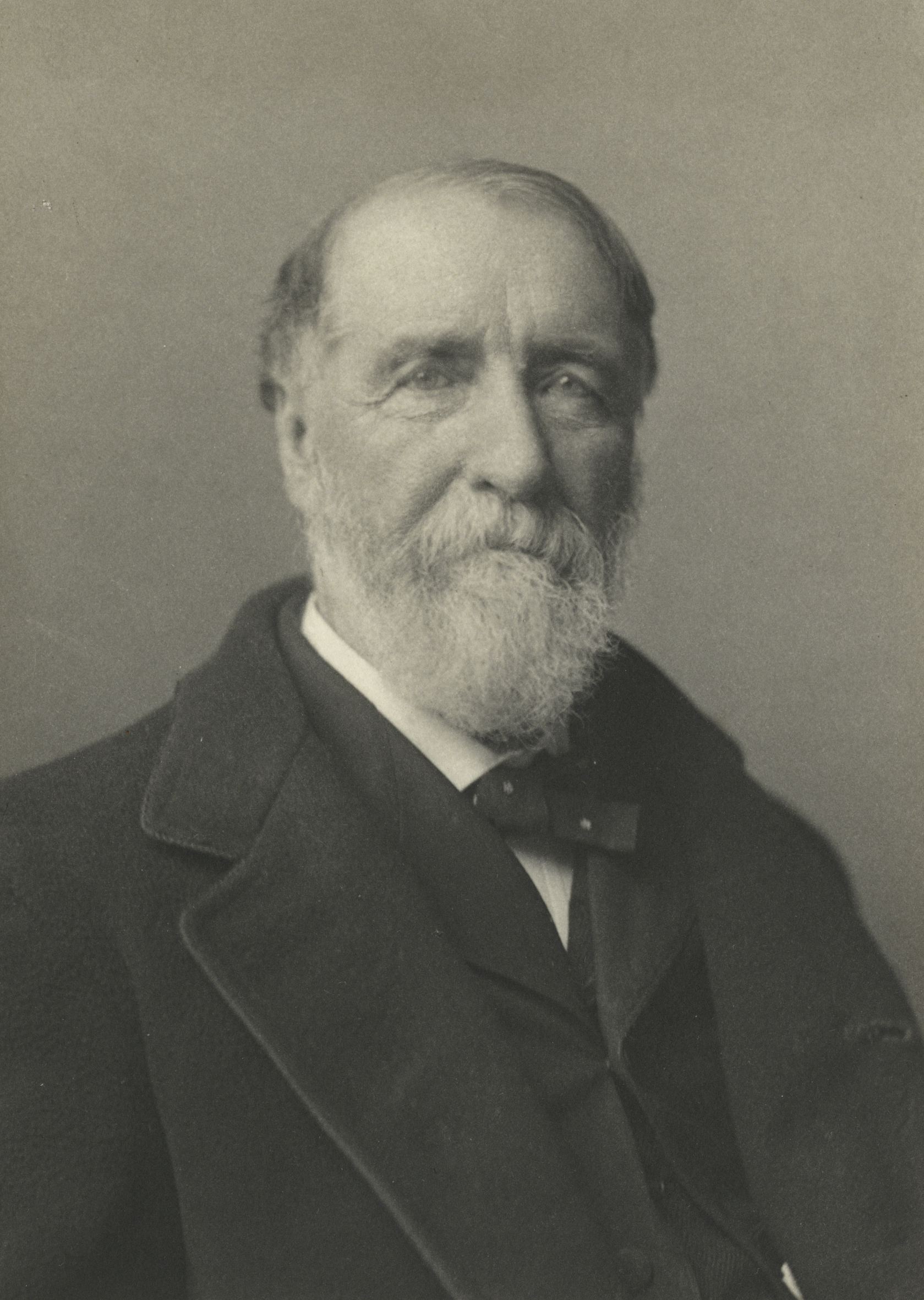
Henry Chadwick

Henry Chadwick is generally credited with the invention of scorekeeping in baseball. Chadwick was also the inventor of the modern box score and the writer of the first rule book for the game of baseball. Since baseball statistics were initially a subject of interest to sportswriters, the role of the official scorer in Major League Baseball (MLB) in the early days of the sport was performed by newspaper writers. A judgment call that is required by the official scorer does not alter the outcome of a game, but these judgments impact the statistical records of the game. As the subjective scoring decisions which are used to calculate baseball statistics began to be used to determine the relative value of baseball players, MLB began to require approval from the league before a writer-scorer could be assigned to produce the scoring report for a game. By the 1970s, writers who were willing to score games for MLB were required to have attended 100 or more games per year in the prior three years and to be chosen by the local chapter chairman of the Baseball Writers' Association of America (BBWAA). Qualified candidates for scoring were submitted to the leagues for approval.

=== Early controversies ===
It's always safer to call it a hit. The batting team is happy, and the fielding team can be ambivalent ... But you have to make the proper call.

— Stew Thornley, official scorer

Baseball writer-scorers usually worked at the games played at the home stadium of the team which they covered for their newspaper. The writer-scorers were tasked with making subjective decisions that could impact the statistics of the team they were writing about. Because of this affiliation, the official scorer was often presumed by the baseball players and managers to favor the home team when making the required judgment calls during the course of a game.

Criticism of scoring decisions date to the earliest days of the game. Some historians claim that Joe DiMaggio's record 56-game hitting streak in 1941 was made possible by several generous rulings at Yankee Stadium. In 1953, Al Rosen narrowly missed being recognized for achieving a rare "triple crown" in hitting after a questioned error caused him to finish the season one hit short of winning the American League batting title.

Although scoring decisions were widely believed to favor the hitter over the defense, many players believed this bias shifts in favor of the pitcher when he carries a no-hitter (where a pitcher throws a complete game without giving up a hit) into the late innings. Infielder Davey Johnson said, "I've been involved in five or six no-hit games, and all of them were suspected of being helped by hometown scoring." One of the last controversies of the writer-scorer era was seen in a 1978 game at St. Louis. In that game, St. Louis pitcher Bob Forsch was pitching a no-hitter in the 8th inning against Philadelphia when a hard ground ball hit into the hole between shortstop and third was narrowly missed by third baseman Ken Reitz. The official scorer Neal Russo (who was a writer for a local newspaper) judged the play to be an error rather than a hit, and Forsch went on to pitch the first no-hitter of the 1978 season.

=== Newspaper reaction ===
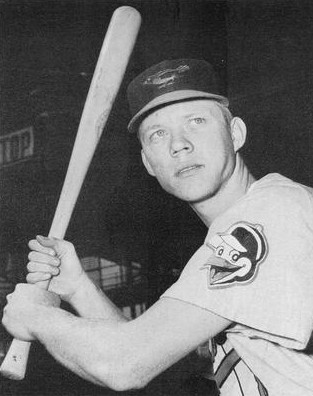
Jerry Adair

A player's baseball statistics can increase or reduce the leverage which he may have in future contract negotiations. Many players also have monetary incentives written in their contracts which are based on statistical measurements, and official scorers have the option to reverse a scoring decision within 24 hours of the conclusion of a game. Because of this, baseball writer-scorers were often subject to pressure from the players they were covering in their newspaper. After a game in 1962, infielder Jerry Adair asked for a meeting with local writer Neal Eskridge after learning that he was the scorer for the game. Angry about an error he had received in the game, Jerry "cursed [Neal] thoroughly and imaginatively, and told him, 'Never talk to me again.'" They reportedly did not speak to each other for almost four years. In the early days of baseball, a disagreement over a scoring decision occasionally led to physical altercations between the player and the writer. Confrontational incidents decreased after 1974 following a warning from MLB.

The pressure and the perceived conflict of interest faced by the baseball writers who scored games for MLB eventually led many major newspapers to end the practice for their employees. In 1958, The Washington Post prohibited their writers from scoring baseball games. Over the next two decades other major newspapers joined in the writer-scorer ban, including The New York Times, the Los Angeles Times, The Boston Globe, and the major daily newspapers published in Atlanta, Detroit, Milwaukee, Minneapolis, and Philadelphia. In 1980, MLB resolved the conflict by directly hiring official scorers for each stadium.

=== After 1980 ===
Today, the MLB commissioner's office directly employs the official scorers who are responsible for producing score reports, although most scorers are hired on the recommendation of the public relations directors of baseball teams. Official scorers are typically retired writers, coaches, and umpires. Unlike umpiring teams, MLB official scorers do not typically travel between stadiums. Each official scorer is assigned to a stadium for the season, with each stadium having one or more scorers. Scorers now have access to replay video from different angles which they can review before making a decision. As of 2012, MLB official scorers earned $150 per game. Official scorers are not required to meet the old BBWAA requirements, and are also no longer required to pass a written test, which was once administered by the National League before it was phased out in the mid-1990s. Potential scorers are generally required to briefly apprentice under an existing scorer before they are allowed to work alone.

Official scorers are only occasionally terminated, but there have been cases when a scorer was replaced after making decisions which displeased the home team. In 1992 the Seattle Mariner players signed a petition to have their official scorer replaced, and in 2001 the management of the Boston Red Sox ordered that a rookie scorer not be allowed to score another game after pitcher Hideo Nomo lost a no-hitter on a close play in right field that was ruled a hit rather than an error.

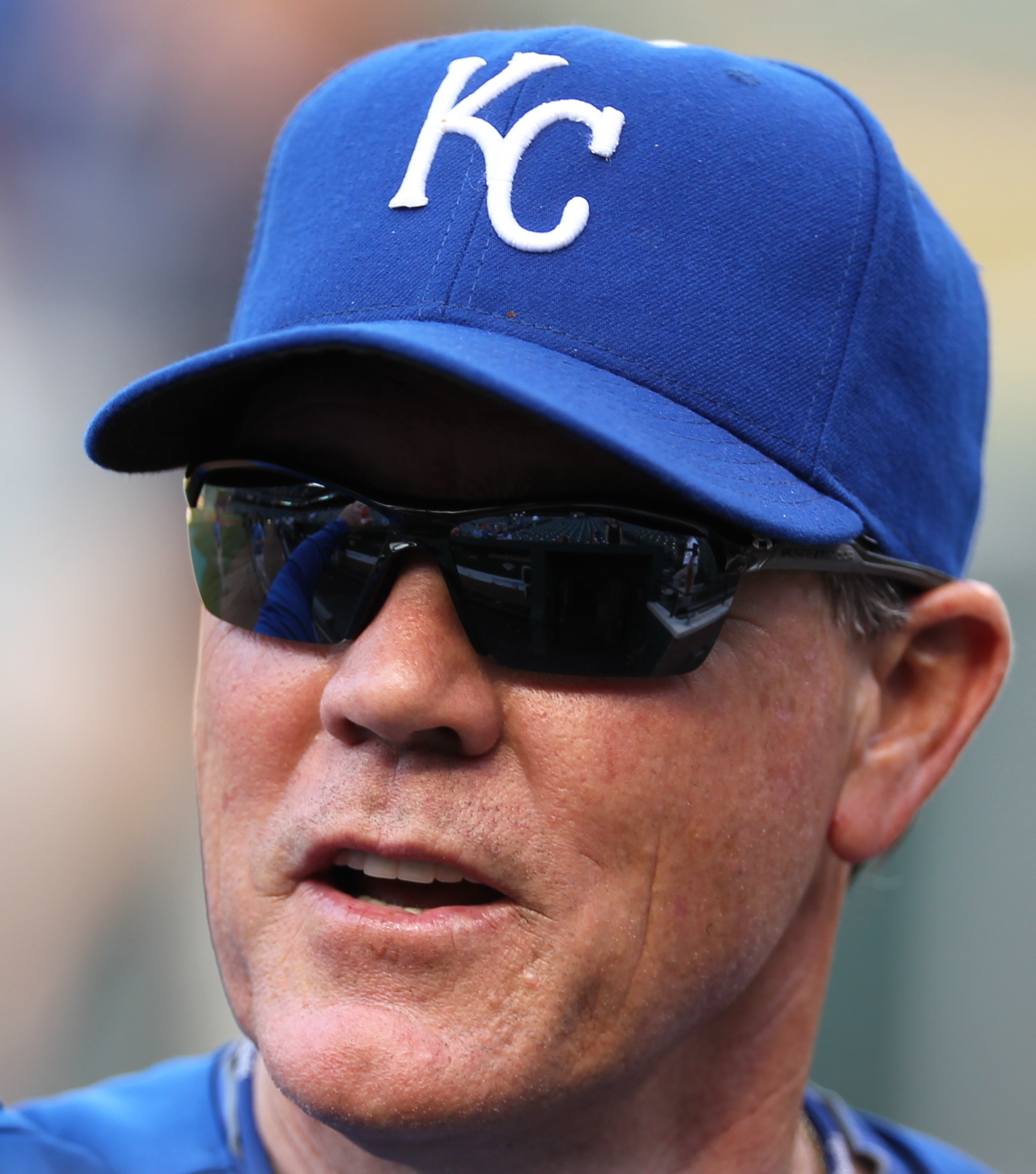
Ned Yost

In 2001, MLB formed a scoring committee to evaluate the performance of official scorers. In 2008, the scoring committee was given the authority to enforce the portion of rule 10.01(a) which allows the league to change a scoring decision that is "clearly erroneous". The committee has used this authority on a few occasions, having overturned three scoring decisions in the 2009 season. The scoring committee came under some scrutiny after a game on August 31, 2008. Milwaukee pitcher CC Sabathia threw a disputed 7–0 one-hit shutout against Pittsburgh. Milwaukee manager Ned Yost argued that the hit recorded by Pittsburgh should have been recorded as an error by the pitcher, but Pittsburgh official scorer Bob Webb disagreed. Yost commented, "That's a joke. That wasn't even close. Whoever the scorekeeper was absolutely denied major league baseball a nice no-hitter right there." The official scorer had argued that the batter was too close to first base to be put out by a clean play. Milwaukee appealed the ruling to the scoring committee, but on September 3 the committee reviewed the footage and supported the ruling by Webb, saying the ruling was not "clearly erroneous" as required by rule 10.01(a).

=== Outside MLB ===
Official scorers in the minor leagues are generally hired by the teams to score games at their stadium. Some minor league scorers have a history or connection with the team, including former players, former coaches, and local writers. Official scorers for international baseball competitions are generally selected by the organizer of the competition.

== Analysis and proposed changes ==
Baseball players, managers, and writers have speculated about bias by the official scorer for decades, but this subject has been objectively studied only recently. In 2006, the rate at which errors have been recorded in MLB by the official scorer was investigated under many situations. The rate at which errors are called is higher when the quality of fielding is suspect and is lower when playing conditions are better, but these factors do not fully explain variations in error rate. After other known factors are accounted for, evidence was found that official scorers are biased toward the home team, but that this bias was reduced after the end of the writer-scorer era in 1979. Further, errors are significantly more likely to be called in the National League than in the American League.

Changes have been proposed over the years to reduce possible inconsistencies between scorers and possible mistakes made by the official scorer, especially as the end of the writer-scorer era began to seem likely in the late 1970s. The BBWAA and professional baseball umpires have suggested the creation of a "fifth umpire". Four-man umpire crews rotate officiating responsibilities after each game, and travel to several stadiums per year. This new fifth umpire would travel with the umpiring crew to score games and take his turn on the bases, but MLB has been reluctant to incur the increased cost. More recently, there have been suggestions to move the official scorer out of the press box and closer to the field behind the plate to get the best view of the game. MLB has conceded that this could be a good idea, but it is not currently feasible because of the design of most stadiums in the league.

== Responsibilities ==
The rules which govern the official scorer are spelled out in Rule 10 of the official rules of baseball. The fundamental responsibilities of the official scorer are explained in rule 10.01.

=== Rule 10.01 ===
The rules of baseball require that the official scorer views the game only from the press box, for two basic reasons. First, this ensures that every scorer has nearly the same perspective of the game. One of the intentions of this rule is to improve consistency in scorekeeping decisions between different official scorers working on different games at the same stadium, and between scorers in different stadiums. Second, the press box is the most neutral position within the stadium. Seated in the press box, the official scorer is surrounded by writers and broadcasters who are ostensibly neutral, and the scorer is less likely to be unduly influenced by the players, the coaches, and the crowd.

Rule 10.01 states that the scorer is never allowed to make scorekeeping decisions that conflict with the official rules governing scorekeeping. The official scorer is permitted to view available replays and to solicit the opinions of others, but the official scorer is given the sole authority to make the judgment calls that are required in the score report. When a judgment call is made, the official scorer is obligated to immediately communicate that decision to the media in the press box and to the broadcasters, usually through a microphone. The official scorer has up to 24 hours to reconsider or reverse a judgment call that was made during the game. In rare circumstances, MLB's scoring committee may reverse a scoring decision that is "clearly erroneous".

Finally, within 36 hours of a game's conclusion (including the conclusion of a suspended game), the official scorer is required to create a summary of the game using a form established by the league. This task is performed for each game that is scored, including called games which must be completely replayed at a later date, and games that end in forfeit. The information in the score report includes the date, location of the game, the names of the teams, the names of the umpires who officiated the game, the final score, and the data that is required in rule 10.02.

=== Judgment calls ===
Most plays in the game are resolved in such a way that the scorer is not given multiple choices when recording the outcome of the play, but several types of plays are open to the interpretation of the official scorer. In any judgment call where the official scorer is required to decide whether to credit a hit to the batter, the scorer is guided by rule 10.05. This rule directs the official scorer to "give the benefit of the doubt to the hitter when the scorer believes that the decision to credit the batter with a hit is equally valid to an alternative scoring decision". In a similarly difficult judgment call where the official scorer believes that an earned run or an unearned run are equally valid scoring decisions, rule 10.16 directs the official scorer to "give the benefit of the doubt to the pitcher".

==== Errors ====
The decision to charge an error to the defense is the most well-known responsibility of the official scorer. Some situations automatically call for an error to be charged to the defense, but most charged errors are the result of a play that requires a judgment call. Broadly speaking, an error is charged to the defense when an "ordinary effort" by the defense would have either recorded an out or prevented a runner from advancing, but the defense fails to do so. When an error is charged, the official scorer must charge the error to one of the fielders who were involved in the play. Errors are primarily discussed in rule 10.12.

One exception in this rule occurs when the defense makes at least one out and attempts to complete a double play or triple play. An error is not charged in that situation if a wild throw allows the runner to reach safely. If a wild throw allows the runner to advance an additional base, an error may then be charged for the additional advance. However, if an accurate throw is made in time to complete a double play or triple play, but the fielder on the base fails to make the catch, an error may be charged.

Rule 10.12 also states that an error should not be charged for a "mental mistake" by the defense. Rather, errors are charged when the defense attempts to make a logical play against the offense, but fails to record an out or prevent an advance due to a mechanical misplay. There is one rare exception to this rule against charging an error for a "mental mistake". If a fielder fails to tag the runner, batter, or a base in a force situation in time to record an out when he could have done so, that fielder is charged with an error.

The most common judgment call involving an error occurs when the defense fails to put out a batter-runner who puts the ball in play. If the out is not recorded and the official scorer believes that an "ordinary effort" by the defense would have resulted in an out, the defense is charged with an error, and the batter is not credited with a hit. Other common situations requiring a judgment call include unintentionally dropped foul balls that allow the batter to continue his at-bat, and poor throws to the next base when a runner attempts to advance.

One of the most controversial and poorly understood situations related to the charging of an error occurs when an outfielder misjudges the flight of a ball and allows the ball to drop out of his reach. This is usually considered to be a "mental mistake" by the outfielder, so the batter is usually credited with a hit. On that topic Bill Shannon, who was an official scorer for the New York Yankees, said "That's a base hit whether we like it or not. As a practical matter, we don't charge errors on those plays. No one says that baseball is entirely fair." Outfielders are generally charged with an error on a fly ball when they arrive at the ball's destination with sufficient time to make a catch with an ordinary effort, but simply miss the catch or drop the ball.

==== Unearned runs ====
Earned runs are runs that are directly attributable to a pitcher's efforts without a lapse by the defense. An unearned run does not adversely impact a pitcher's earned run average (ERA), and is only possible when an error (including catcher's interference) or a passed ball occurs earlier in the inning. Unearned runs are primarily discussed in rule 10.16 and often require a judgment call by the official scorer.

At the conclusion of an inning during which runs are scored after an error or passed ball, the official scorer attempts to recreate the events of the inning without the errors or passed balls. If in the official scorer's opinion a run would not have scored without the defensive lapses, then the run is unearned. If the scorer believes that a run would have scored anyway, the run is earned and charged to the pitcher. In one basic example, if the first batter reaches by an error, the second batter hits a home run, and the next three batters strike out, then one of the two runs scored was unearned. There are rules and restrictions which govern this general guideline.

When reconstructing an inning without errors or passed balls:

- Potential outs that were not recorded because of an error are presumed to be an out when the inning is reconstructed by the official scorer.
- Intentional walks which were issued are still presumed to be walks.
- Runs that are scored after what should have been the third out are automatically considered to be unearned.
- When the batter is given first base because of catcher's interference or obstruction, the official scorer does not presume that an out would have been recorded on that runner, but if that runner later scores the run is unearned.
- A run scored by a runner who advances due to an error or passed ball is unearned, unless it would not have made a difference in the reconstruction of the inning.

Most of the above rules are straightforward, but some judgment is required by the official scorer when a baserunner advances due to a defensive lapse and later scores. In this situation, the official scorer must decide what would have happened if the runner had not advanced. This is often an easy decision, but it can occasionally be difficult. In one difficult example with a runner on first and two outs, the batter hits a single but a defensive error allows an advance by the lead runner from second to third, and a soft run-scoring single is hit followed by an out. In that situation, the offense "should" have had runners on first and second with 2 outs when the run-scoring single was hit. Since the next batter was put out, the official scorer must decide based on the hit, the speed of the baserunner, and the positioning of the defense whether the runner would have been able to score from second in the reconstruction of the inning without the error.

==== Fielder's choice ====
In the rules of baseball, aside from the rare case of interference or obstruction, a batter who puts a ball into play and safely reaches first base is ruled to have reached in one of three possible ways: a hit, an error, or by fielder's choice. Fielder's choice is primarily discussed in rules 10.05 and 10.06, and it generally occurs when it is judged that a batter-runner would have been put out had the defense chosen to do so.

Most judgment calls made by the official scorer under this rule occur in three situations: when an infielder, pitcher, or catcher attempts to put out an unforced preceding runner who is attempting to advance one base, when any fielder attempts and fails to put out a forced preceding runner, and when any fielder attempts and fails to put out an unforced preceding runner who returns to their original base. In these situations, the official scorer is required to determine whether the batter-runner would have safely reached first base if the defense made an ordinary effort to put him out. If the defense could not be reasonably expected to make the play, the batter is credited with a hit, otherwise he is ruled to have reached by fielder's choice. If an error is made on the attempt to put out a preceding runner, that has no impact on this decision. It is instead noted to have occurred in addition to the hit or fielder's choice.

In some cases the official scorer is not given the discretion to decide between awarding a hit to the batter or ruling that he safely reached first base by fielder's choice. If a preceding runner is forced out or if an unforced preceding runner is put out while attempting to return to their original base, a hit is automatically not credited and the batter by rule is judged to have reached by a fielder's choice. In some situations this rule may appear unfair to the batter. For example, if the batter is a fast runner, the ball is slowly hit to the third baseman, and an unforced runner from second realizes (too late) that he can not safely advance, the batter-runner will lose the potential hit on a fielder's choice by the third baseman. This occurs regardless of whether the batter-runner would have reached first base with an ordinary effort to put him out.

==== Value of hits ====
In cases where a batter indisputably gets a hit and is able to safely advance past first base on the play, the value of that hit may be adjusted by the official scorer because of an error or a fielder's choice.

If the defense attempts to put out a preceding runner during the play, the official scorer must determine whether the batter would have reached second or third base safely had the defense attempted to limit the batter's advance. For example, if a runner on second attempts to score after a soft hit to center field and the center fielder chooses to throw to home while the batter advances to second, the official scorer must decide the value of the hit. In this situation, the scorer may either choose to credit the batter with a double, or the scorer may rule that the batter hit a single with an advance to second by fielder's choice. This is often referred to as "an advance on the throw".

If an error occurs during the play when a batter records a hit, the official scorer must determine whether the batter would have advanced as far as he did had the error not occurred. For example, if a batter hits a ball into an outfield gap, the ball is badly misplayed by an outfielder attempting to retrieve and throw the ball back into the infield, and the batter is able to reach all four bases to score, then the official scorer must decide whether an error should be charged to the outfielder. If no error is charged, then the batter would be credited with an "inside the park" home run. If an error is charged to the outfielder, then the batter would likely be credited with either a double or triple.

==== Wild pitch ====
When a baserunner is able to advance after a pitch is not caught or controlled by the catcher, the official scorer must determine whether the advance was due to a wild pitch or a passed ball. The pitch is never considered to be an error. If a pitch is thrown so high, wide, or low in relation to the strike zone that a catcher is not able to catch or control the ball with ordinary effort before a runner can advance, the advance is ruled to have occurred by a wild pitch. Any such pitch which strikes the ground before it reaches home plate is automatically considered to be a wild pitch. However, a pitch is not a wild pitch merely because it is off-target. If the official scorer determines that the catcher should have been able to control the pitch and prevent an advance with ordinary effort, then the catcher is charged with a passed ball on the advance.

One exception to this rule occurs when a baserunner attempts to steal a base. If the runner "starts for the next base" before the pitcher delivers the pitch, the runner is credited with a stolen base and a wild pitch or passed ball is not charged. If a wild pitch or passed ball allows a runner to advance beyond the base that is stolen, the scorer may rule that the further advance occurred by a wild pitch or passed ball.

==== Other judgment calls ====
Some relatively uncommon situations may also require a judgment call by the official scorer.

When a defensive player has the ball and can end the play by preventing further advance, but fails to do so because of a mental mistake (not an error) and a runner subsequently scores, the official scorer must decide whether to credit the batter with a run batted in (RBI). If the runner recognized the mistake after slowing or pausing his advance, an RBI is not credited. If the runner was oblivious to the mistake or runs home without slowing, the batter is credited with an RBI.

If a runner advances because the defense does nothing to try to stop the advance, the scorer may rule that the advance was due to defensive indifference and no stolen base is credited. However, a throw is not required for a stolen base. If a fielder begins to visibly make an attempt to prevent an advance but then elects not to throw, the advance is not due to defensive indifference.

When a batter attempts a sacrifice bunt and the resulting bunt is so well-placed that he safely reaches first base, the official scorer may elect to credit the batter with a hit instead of a sacrifice if there is no error on the play and an ordinary effort by the defense would not have recorded an out.

Finally, when the starting pitcher of the winning team does not qualify for the win under rule 10.17, and the relief pitcher who would otherwise qualify for the win pitches "ineffectively" in a "brief appearance", the official scorer may choose to credit a "succeeding relief pitcher" with the win.

== See also ==
- Red Foley, a sportswriter and official scorer
- J. G. Taylor Spink, an official scorer
- Dubious Goals Committee (English Premier League soccer)

== Sources ==
- Kalist, David E.; Spurr, Stephen J. (2006), "Baseball Errors", Journal of Quantitative Analysis in Sports, 2 (4), doi:10.2202/1559-0410.1043, S2CID 201121756, archived from the original on 2007-03-02
- Wirkmaa, Andres (2003). Baseball Scorekeeping: A Practical Guide to the Rules. Jefferson, North Carolina: McFarland & Co. ISBN 0-7864-1448-0.
