= Official =

Person who holds an office

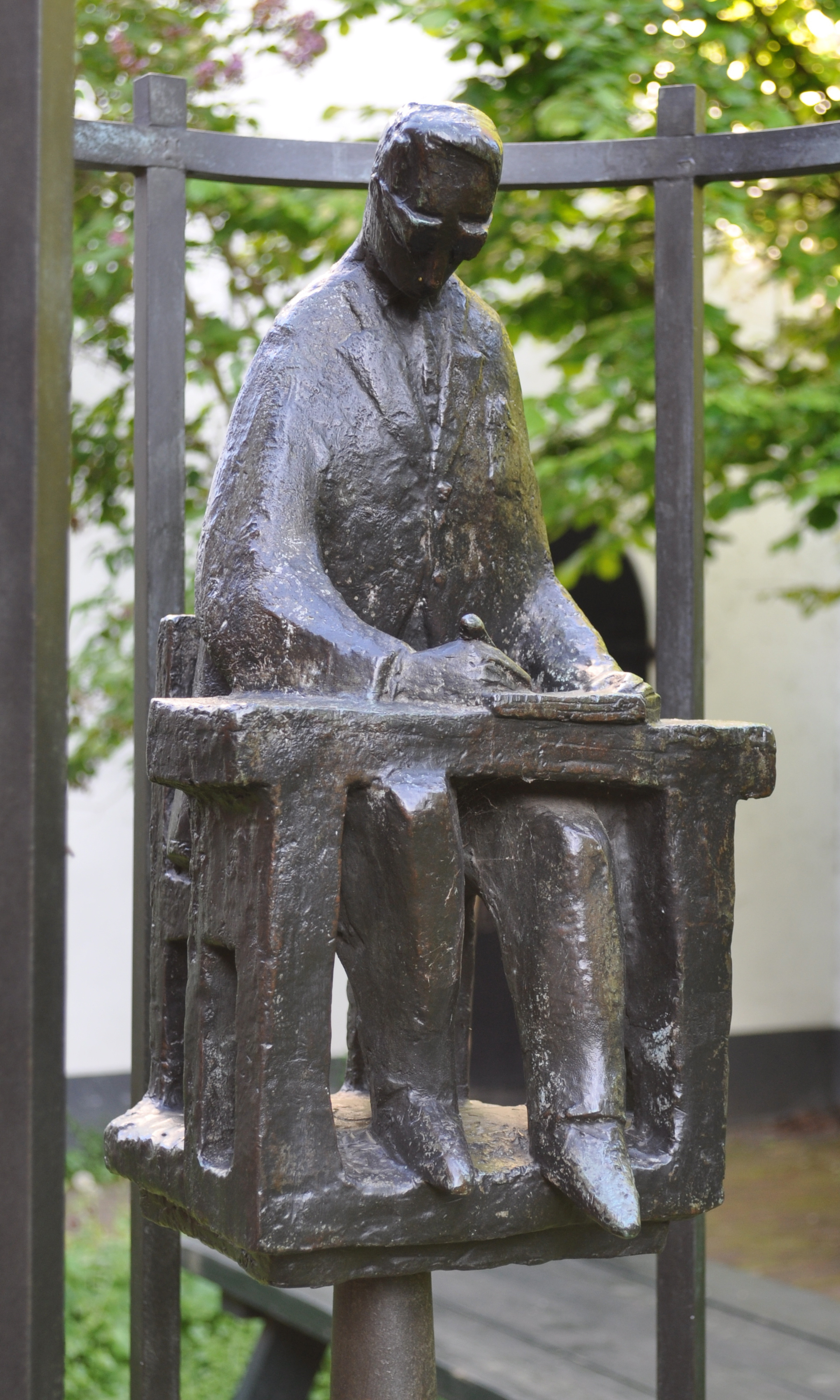
Ambtenaar ('government official'), by Louis Dusée, Utrecht, 1961

An official is someone who holds an office (function or mandate, regardless of whether it carries an actual working space with it) in an organization or government and participates in the exercise of authority (either their own or that of their superior or employer, public or legally private). The term officer is close to being a synonym, but it has more military connotations. An elected official is a person who is an official by virtue of an election.

Officials may also be appointed ex officio (by virtue of another office, often in a specified capacity, such as presiding, advisory, secretary). Some official positions may be inherited. A public official is an official of central or local government. A person who currently holds an office is referred to as an incumbent. Used as an adjective, something "official" refers to something endowed with governmental or other authoritative recognition or mandate, as in official language, official gazette, or Official scorer.

A functionary is someone who carries out a particular role within an organization; this again is quite a close synonym for official, as a noun, but with connotations closer to bureaucrat. Any such person acts in their official capacity in carrying out the duties of their office; they are also said to officiate, for example, in a ceremony. In some court cases, claims made against an organisation because of its alleged actions may also be brought against persons "acting in their official capacity". In the UK, the Supreme Court case of TRA, R. v. United Kingdom (2019) looks into this usage and provides details of some significant court cases where "acting in an official capacity" has been interpreted.

== Etymology ==
The word official as a noun has been recorded since the Middle English period, first seen in 1314. It comes from the Old French official (12th century), from the Latin officialis ("attendant to a magistrate, government official"), the noun use of the original adjective officialis ("of or belonging to duty, service, or office") from officium ("office"). The meaning "person in charge of some public work or duty" was first recorded in 1555. The adjective is first attested in English in 1533 via the Old French oficial. The informal term officialese, the jargon of "officialdom", was first recorded in 1884.

== Noun ==
=== Roman antiquity ===
An officialis (plural officiales) was any member of the officium (staff) of a high dignitary such as a governor — somewhat comparable to a modern civil servant.

=== Ecclesiastical judiciary ===
In canon law, the word or its Latin original officialis is used absolutely as the legal title of a diocesan bishop's judicial vicar who shares the bishop's ordinary judicial power over the diocese and presides over the diocesan ecclesiastical court.

The 1983 Code of Canon Law gives precedence to the title judicial vicar, rather than that of officialis (canon 1420). The Code of Canons of the Eastern Churches uses only the title judicial vicar (canon 191).

In German, the related noun Offizialat was also used for an official bureau in a diocese that did much of its administration, comprising the vicariate-general, an adjoined secretariat, a registry office and a chancery.

In Catholicism, the vicar-general was originally called the "official" (officialis).

The title of official principal, together with that of vicar-general, has in Anglicanism been merged in that of diocesan chancellor of a diocese.

=== Sports ===
In sports, the term official is used to describe a person enforcing playing rules in the capacity of an assistant referee, referee and umpire; also specified by the discipline, e.g. American football official, ice hockey official. An official competition is created or recognized as valid by the competent body, is agreed to or arranged by people in positions of authority. It is synonymous, among others, with approved, certified, recognized, endorsed, and legitimate.

=== Max Weber on bureaucratic officials ===
Max Weber gave as definition of a bureaucratic official:

- they are personally free and appointed to their position on the basis of conduct
- he exercises the authority delegated to them in accordance with impersonal rules, and their loyalty is enlisted on behalf of the faithful execution of their official duties
- their appointment and job placement are dependent upon their technical qualifications
- their administrative work is a full-time occupation
- their work is rewarded by a regular salary and prospects of advancement in a lifetime career.

An official must exercise their judgment and their skills, but their duty is to place these at the service of a higher authority; ultimately they are responsible only for the impartial execution of assigned tasks and must sacrifice their personal judgment if it runs counter to their official duties.

== Adjective ==
As an adjective, "official" often, but not always, means pertaining to the government, as state employee or having state recognition, or analogous to governance or to a formal (especially legally regulated) proceeding as opposed to informal business. In summary, that has authenticity emanates from an authority. Some examples:

- An official holiday is a public holiday, having national (or regional) recognition.
- An official language is a language recognised by a government, for its own use in administration, or for delivering services to its citizens (for example, on signposts).
- An official spokesperson is an individual empowered to speak for the government, or some part of it such as a ministry, on a range of issues and on the record for the media.
- An official statement is an issued by an organisation as an expression of its corporate position or opinion; an official apology is an apology similarly issued by an organisation (as opposed to an apology by an individual).
- Official policy is policy publicly acknowledged and defended by an organisation. In these cases unofficial is an antonym, and variously may mean informal, unrecognised, personal or unacknowledged.
- An official strike is a strike organised and recognised by a labour union, as opposed to an unofficial strike at grassroots level.
- An official school is a school administered by the government or by a local authority, as opposite to a private school or religious school.
- An official history, for example of an institution or business, or particularly of a war or military unit, is a history written as a commission, with the assumption of co-operation with access to records and archives; but without necessarily full editorial independence.
- An official biography is usually on the same lines, written with access to private papers and the support of the family of the subject.

== See also ==
- Canonical
- Politician
- Term of office
- Title
