= Strikeout looking =

Baseball terminology

In baseball or softball, a strikeout looking is a strikeout in which a batter, having incurred two strikes already, does not swing on their third strike called by the umpire — meaning the batter does not attempt to hit a pitch called as being within the strike zone. In scorekeeping, strikeouts are a statistic often denoted by the letter "K", with strikeouts looking being sometimes denoted by a reversed K ("Ʞ"). Though the pitcher records a strikeout looking, it can also be said that the batter was "caught looking" when struck out in this manner.

== History and analysis ==
In baseball, a pitcher pitches the ball at the batter. The pitch results in a strike if the batter swings at the ball or otherwise attempts to hit the pitch with their bat but fails to do so. A third strike results in a strikeout. If the batter hits the pitch into foul territory, this is also a strike, unless the batter has two strikes. Finally, a "called strike" results when the batter does not swing at the pitch, but the umpire determines that the ball passed through the strike zone, referring to the volume of space above home plate with a height rising from the batter's knees to the midpoint of their torso. A strikeout from a called third strike is a "strikeout looking".

The letter "K" was chosen to denote strikeouts by baseball writer Henry Chadwick, who first used it in 1859 in his box scores, which he is also credited with creating. Chadwick had already chosen "S" to denote a sacrifice in his scorekeeping, so he opted to use "K", as it was the final letter in "struck", which was the common way to refer to a batter being out after three strikes. Speaking to the Longview News-Journal, Cassidy Lent, a National Baseball Hall of Fame reference librarian, shared that the Hall of Fame knows of no single person who can be credited with first using the "Ʞ" to denote a strikeout looking. Lent added that "this might have to do with the fact that there are several different ways to record strikeouts", as not all scorekeepers use the backwards K, "and it probably did just evolve with scorekeeping".

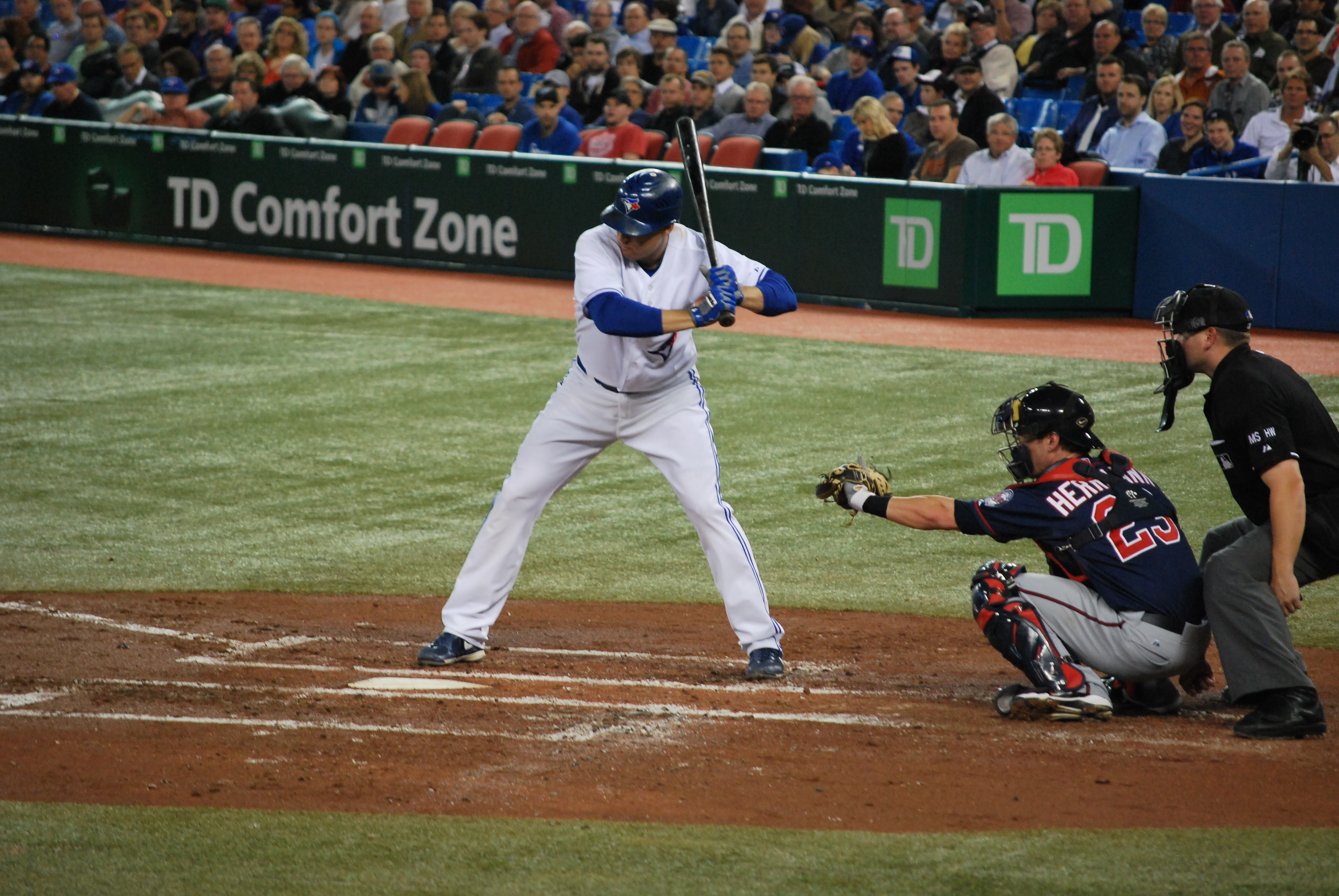
Toronto Blue Jays second baseman Kelly Johnson strikes out looking in October 2012 to tie Toronto's franchise record for strikeouts.

In 2013, CBS Sports writer Matt Snyder examined Major League Baseball (MLB)'s pitchers with the most strikeouts looking that season. Snyder wrote that pitchers who possessed "great command" or "great stuff" were likely to be on the list; he described the former as pitchers who were able to "[hit] a spot low and outside that barely registers as a strike", with the latter being the skill to "fool the hitter into taking an obvious strike". Writing for MLB.com about the ways to cause an out, Chris Landers wrote that "it takes something truly special to cause a Major League hitter—a man who has dedicated his entire life to swinging a bat—to let strike three sail on by".

In 2021, ESPN writer Tim Kurkjian wrote that strikeouts looking had increased, detailing that in previous eras, "hitters wanted to put the ball in play as much as the pitchers wanted them to put it in play. Today, hitters wait and wait and wait for that one pitch they can drive". Kurkjian added that, "in 2004, Adam Dunn struck out looking 66 times, which was more times than Ted Williams struck out in any season, looking or swinging. In 2018, the White Sox's Yoan Moncada struck out looking 85 times.

== See also ==
- Glossary of baseball terms
