= Red Foley (sportswriter) =

American sportswriter and baseball official scorer

Arthur "Red" Foley (December 26, 1928 – July 14, 2008) was an American sportswriter and baseball official scorer.

Foley began working as an official scorer for Major League Baseball in 1966, and during his career presided over more than 3,000 games. From 1981 to 2001 he was an official scorer in ten World Series, serving longer than any other scorer in modern history. He retired in 2002.

His career as a sportswriter spanned 34 years up to 1981, during which time he wrote articles for the New York Daily News. During this time he was an officer of the Baseball Writers' Association of America for many years. In 1969–70, he served as chairman of the New York City chapter.

In 2008, he was inducted into the Irish American Baseball Hall of Fame. Foley died July 14, 2008.
