= Outfielder =

Defensive position in baseball

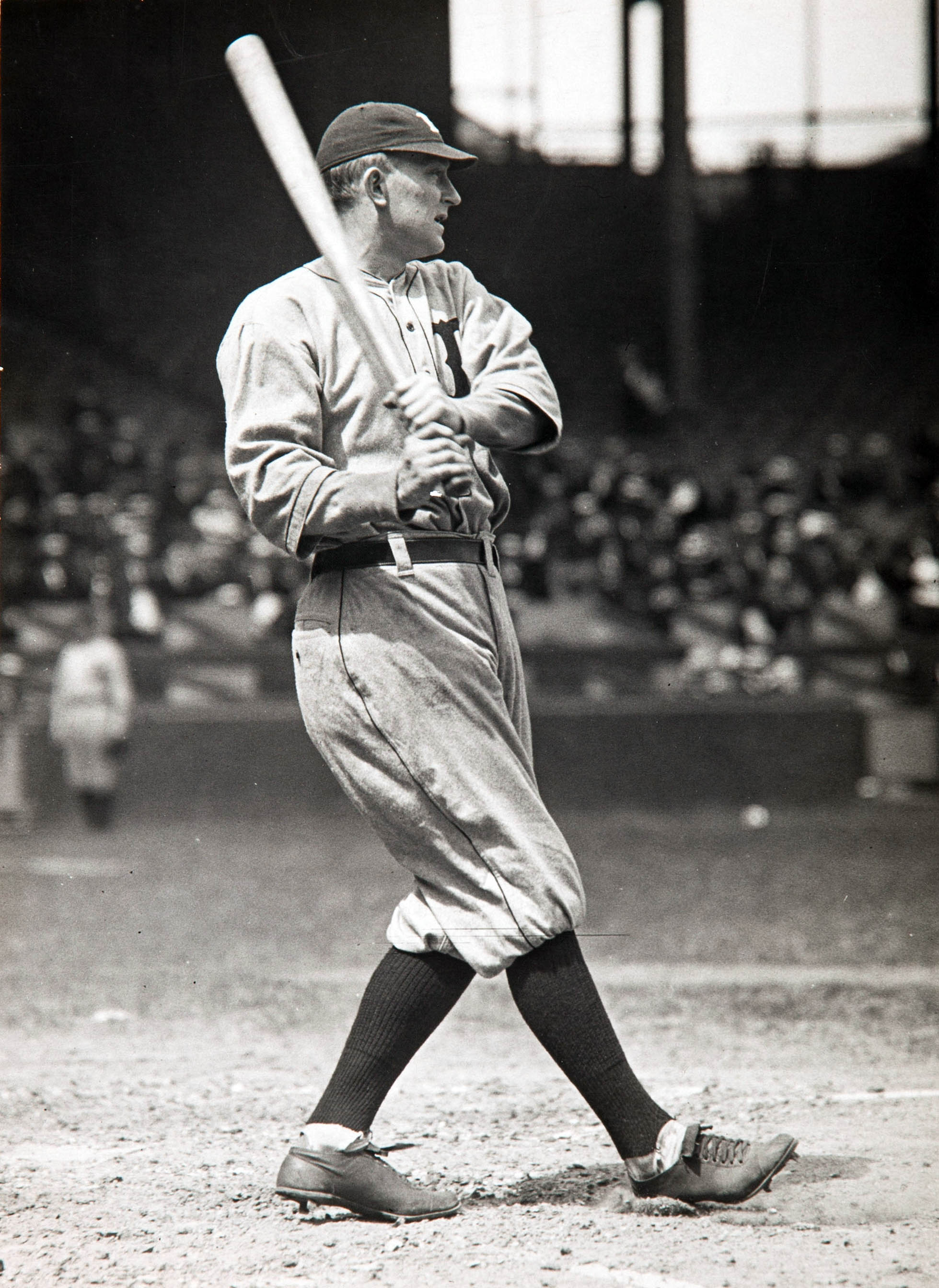
Ty Cobb holds the record for most games played as an outfielder in Major League Baseball history, with 2,934.

An outfielder is a person playing in one of the three defensive positions in baseball or softball, farthest from the batter. These defenders are the left fielder, the center fielder, and the right fielder. As an outfielder, their duty is to catch fly balls and ground balls then to return them to the infield for the out or before the runner advances, if there are any runners on the bases. Outfielders normally play behind the six defensive players located in the infield: the pitcher, catcher, first baseman, second baseman, third baseman, and shortstop. The left fielder and right fielder are named based on their positions relative to the center fielder when looking out from home plate, with the left fielder positioned to the left of the center fielder and the right fielder positioned to the right.

By convention, each of the nine defensive positions in baseball are numbered. The outfield positions are 7 (left fielder), 8 (center fielder) and 9 (right fielder). These numbers are shorthand designations useful in baseball scorekeeping and are not the same as the squad numbers worn on player uniforms.

Outfielders named to the MLB All-Century Team are Hank Aaron, Ty Cobb, Joe DiMaggio, Mickey Mantle, Willie Mays, Stan Musial, Pete Rose, Babe Ruth, Ted Williams, Carl Yastrzemski, and Ken Griffey Jr.

== Strategy ==
Players can be characterized as either corner outfielders or a center fielder. Corner outfielders are often slower and have less defensive value than the center fielder. However, there are some important differences between right fielders and left fielders. Right fielders tend to have the best throwing arms of the outfield so they can make the long throw to third base, but often are not as fast as left fielders. Center fielders are generally the fastest and most athletic of the three, because they have to run the farthest in order to field balls in the gaps and back up the other outfielders when balls are hit to them. Outfielders should also be able to read where the ball may be placed based on what the pitcher is throwing. They can tell what the pitcher is throwing by the middle infielders, second base and short stop, in which they show the numbers the catcher is giving to the pitcher behind their back to determine the pitch and tell where the ball could possibly be hit to.

Many of the best power hitters in baseball play in the outfield, where they do not have as constant involvement in fielding plays as other positions, especially before the institution of the designated hitter. For example, Babe Ruth was moved from pitcher to the outfield. Left fielders and right fielders are more often slow power hitters, and center fielders are usually fast base-runners and good defensive players. Center field is often considered the most difficult outfield position, requiring both a good throwing arm and speed. Center fielders on many teams often bat lead off.

Players who do not routinely start games, but often substitute as a pinch hitter or defensive replacement in the outfield are referred to as fourth outfielders or even fifth outfielders. These players can usually play any of the three outfield positions.

== Corner outfielders ==
Corner outfielders are outfielders who play the corner positions of right field and left field. Corner outfielders often have less speed than center fielders, but make up for this deficiency with their offensive play.

Left fielders usually handle more chances because right-handed hitters tend to hit balls to the left, and right-handedness is more common in baseball, as in most things, than left-handedness. Many left fielders have the speed to play center field, but lack the throwing ability required. Right fielders typically have stronger arms, but are frequently (not always) slower and less agile defensively. Right fielders typically need stronger arms than left fielders because the throw from right field to each base (except first base) is longer than the throw from left field to each base; also, because baserunners run counterclockwise around the bases, they're usually running away from the right fielder. Many corner outfielders are capable of playing in either right or left field.

An example of an ultra-fast left fielder is Rickey Henderson (Ben Oglivie and Lou Brock can fit this description too), whereas the slow-footed but very strong-armed Carl Furillo, "The Reading Rifle", sets a standard for right fielders in the terms specified here.
