= Inning =

Unit of play in baseball, softball, and other similar games

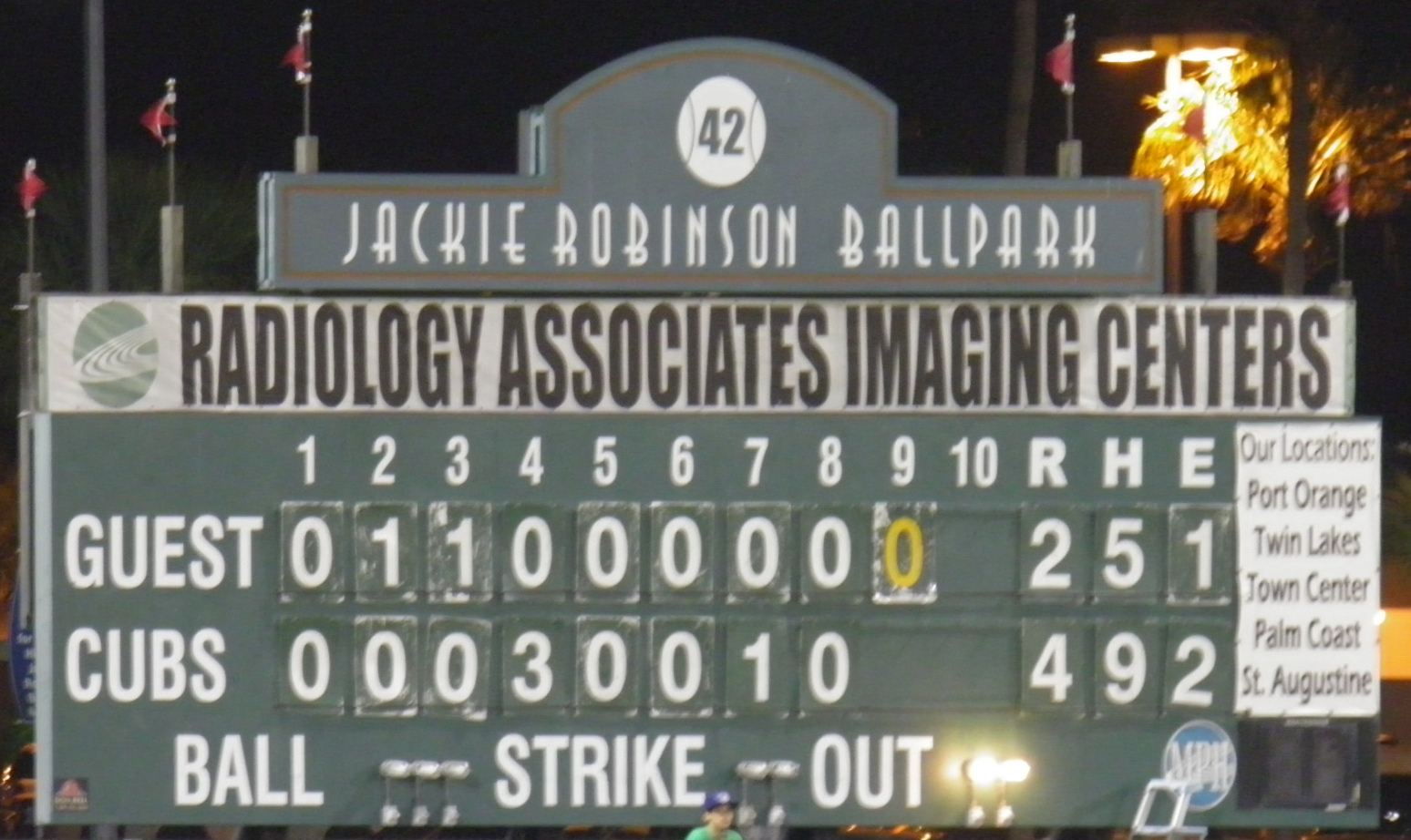
A baseball scoreboard

In baseball, softball, and similar games, an inning is the basic unit of play, consisting of two halves or frames, the "top" (first half) and the "bottom" (second half). In each half, one team bats until three outs are made, with the other team playing defense. A full baseball game is typically scheduled for nine innings, while softball games consist of seven innings, although this may be shortened due to weather, or extended if the score is tied at the end of the scheduled innings. The use of the term inning in baseball and softball contrasts with cricket and rounders, in which the term is innings in both singular and plural.

== Gameplay ==
Each half-inning formally starts when the umpire calls "Play" or "Play ball". A full inning consists of six outs, three for each team, and, in Major League Baseball and most other adult leagues, a regulation game consists of nine innings. The visiting team bats in the first half-inning, the top of the inning, derived from the position of the visiting team at the top line of a baseball line score. The home team's half of an inning is the bottom of the inning, and the break between halves of an inning is the middle of the inning. If the home team is leading after the top half of the final scheduled inning, or scores to take the lead in the bottom of the final scheduled inning, the game immediately ends in a home victory.

In most leagues, if the score is tied after the final scheduled inning, the game goes into extra innings until an inning ends with one team ahead of the other. In Japanese baseball, however, games end if tied after twelve innings (or, in postseason play in Nippon Professional Baseball, fifteen innings). For the 2011 and 2012 NPB season, a game also ended in a tie if a regular-season game has reached its 3-hour, 30-minute time limit, and both teams are tied. As in the case of the ninth inning, a home team which scores to take a lead in any extra inning automatically wins, and the inning (and the game) is considered complete at that moment regardless of the number of outs. This is commonly referred to as a "walk-off" situation since the last play results in the teams walking off the field because the game is over. However, road teams cannot earn a "walk-off" victory by scoring the go-ahead run in extra innings, unlike in ice hockey where the team (either home or away) scoring first in overtime automatically wins.

A baseball game can be shorter than scheduled innings if it is interrupted by rain (or other bad weather). Such a game is said to be rained out, and is often preceded by a rain delay, a pause in the game during which the umpires will try to determine if the weather will allow the game to continue. If so, the game will simply be delayed until the rain stops, and then play will resume. If not, the umpires will announce a rainout and play will be suspended for the day. The game may have to be replayed in its entirety at a later date, but under certain circumstances, a game shortened because of rain can count as an official game, and the team that was ahead at the time the game was called will be awarded the win.

Professional baseball games as well as college baseball games are scheduled for nine innings. Softball games and high school baseball games are scheduled for seven innings, as are some minor league baseball doubleheaders. Major League doubleheaders comprised scheduled seven inning games during the 2020 and 2021 seasons due to the COVID pandemic, but returned to nine innings in 2022. College games may be shortened to seven innings if one team's score is ahead by a minimum of ten runs, or as part of a doubleheader. Little League games are scheduled for six innings and may be shortened further (auto-forfeit) if a team has an overwhelming scoring lead.

== Terminology ==
Ending a half-inning is referred to as "retiring the side". A half-inning in which all batters are put out without taking a base is referred to as a "one-two-three inning". The number of innings a pitcher is in a game is measured by the innings pitched statistic.

In US English, baseball terminology is sometimes found in non-sports usage in a tense situation: "it's the bottom of the ninth [inning]" (sometimes adding, "with two outs"), meaning "there isn't much time to turn things around here".

== See also ==
- Seventh-inning stretch
- Innings
