= Origins of baseball =

The question of the origins of baseball has been the subject of debate and controversy for more than a century. Baseball and the other modern bat, ball, and running games – stoolball, cricket and rounders – were developed from folk games in early Great Britain, Ireland, and Continental Europe, some of which may date to the Late Middle Ages. These early predecessors to baseball had a number of names, including "base ball", "goal ball", "round ball", "fetch-catch", "stool ball", and, simply, "base". In at least one version of the game, teams pitched to themselves, runners went around the bases in the opposite direction of today's game, much like in the Nordic brännboll, and players could be put out by being hit with the ball. Just as now, in some versions a batter was called out after three strikes.

The first written attestations of an established game called "baseball" involving striking a pitched ball and then running a circuit of bases date to the mid-18th century in Southern England. English colonists took this game to North America with their other pastimes, and in the early 1800s variants were being played on both sides of the ocean under many appellations. The Knickerbocker Rules, codified in 1845, are the earliest extant rules from which the evolution of modern baseball can be lineally traced.

== Folk games in early Britain, Ireland and continental Europe ==
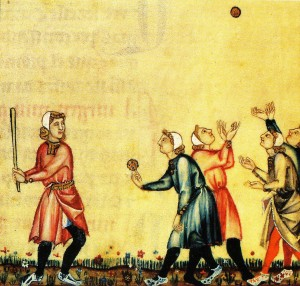
A game involving throwing and striking elements similar to those of baseball, from the 13th-century Canticles of Holy Mary

A number of folk games in early Britain and continental Europe had characteristics that can be seen in modern baseball (as well as in cricket and rounders). Many of these early games involved a ball that was thrown at a target while an opposing player defended the target by attempting to hit the ball away. If the batter successfully hit the ball, he could attempt to score points by running between bases while fielders would attempt to catch or retrieve the ball and put the runner out. Folk games differed over time, place, and culture, resulting in similar yet variant forms. These games had no standard documented rules and instead were played according to historical customs. These games tended to be played by working classes, peasants, and children. Early folk games were often associated with earlier religious ceremonies and worship rituals. These games became discouraged and even altogether prohibited by subsequent governing states and religious authorities.

Aside from obvious differences in terminology, the games differed in the equipment used (ball, bat, club, target, etc., which were usually just whatever was available), the way in which the ball was thrown, the method of scoring, the method of making outs, the layout of the field and the number of players involved. Very broadly speaking, these games can be roughly divided into forms of longball, where the batter ran out to a single point or line and back, as in cricket, and roundball, where there was a circuit of multiple bases. There were also games (e.g. stool-ball, trap-ball) which involved no running at all.

=== Oină ===
Oină is a Romanian traditional sport, a form of longball similar in many ways to lapta.

The name "oină" was originally "hoina", and is derived from the Cuman word oyn "game" (a cognate of Turkish oyun). The oldest direct mention comes from 1364.

In 1899, Spiru Haret, the minister of education decided that oină was to be played in schools in physical education classes. He organized the first annual oină competitions.

The Romanian Oină Federation ("Federaţia Română de Oină") was founded in 1932, and was reactivated at the beginning of the 1950s, after a brief period when it was dissolved.

Today, there are two oină federations: one in Bucharest, Romania and another one in Chişinău, Moldova.

=== Stoolball ===
In an 1802 book entitled The Sports and Pastimes of the People of England, Joseph Strutt claimed to have shown that baseball-like games can be traced back to the 14th century, in particular an English game called stoolball. The earliest known reference to stoolball is in a 1330 poem by William Pagula, who recommended to priests that the game be forbidden within churchyards.

In stoolball, one player throws the ball at a target while another player defends the target. Originally, the target was defended with a bare hand. Later, a bat of some kind was used (in modern stoolball, a bat like a very heavy table tennis paddle is used). "Stob-ball" and "stow-ball" were regional games similar to stoolball. What the target originally was in stoolball is not certain; it was possibly a tree stump, since "stob" and "stow" all mean stump in some local dialects. ("Stow" could also refer to a type of frame used in mining). It is notable that in cricket to this day, the uprights of the wicket are called "stumps". Of course, the target could well have been whatever was convenient, perhaps even a gravestone (hence Pagula's objection to churchyard play). A 17th-century book on games specifies a stool.

According to one legend, milkmaids played stoolball while waiting for their husbands to return from the fields. Another theory is that stoolball developed as a game played after attending church services, in which case the target was probably a church stool. An 18th-century poem depicts men and women playing together (the women using their aprons to catch batted balls), and it and other references associate the game especially with the Easter season.

There were several versions of stoolball. In the earliest versions, the object was primarily to defend the stool. Successfully defending the stool counted for one point, and the batter was out if the ball hit the stool. There was no running involved. Another version of stoolball involved running between two stools, and scoring was similar to the scoring in cricket. In perhaps yet another version there were several stools, and points were scored by running around them as in baseball.

When Englishmen came to America, they brought stoolball with them. William Bradford in his diary for Christmas Day, 1621, noted (with disapproval) how the men of Plymouth were "frolicking in þe street, at play openly; some pitching þe barre, some at stoole-ball and shuch-like sport". Because of the different versions of stoolball, and because it was played not only in England, but also in colonial America, stoolball is considered by many to have been the common ancestor of cricket, baseball and rounders.

=== Tut-ball ===
In tut-ball or pize-ball, which was similar to both stoolball and rounders, the corners of the infield were marked by "tuts" (sods or pieces of brick that marked the bases) rather than stools, and the batter generally hit with their hand.

=== Dog and cat ===
Another early folk game was "dog and cat" (or "cat and dog"), which probably originated in Scotland. In cat and dog an oblong piece of wood called a cat is thrown at a hole in the ground while another player defends the hole with a stick (a dog). In some cases there were two holes and, after hitting the cat, the batter would run between them while fielders would try to get the runner out by putting the cat in the hole before the runner got to it. Dog and cat thus resembled cricket.

=== Horne-billets ===
This game, otherwise unknown, was described in Francis Willughby's Book of Games (ca. 1670), which included rules for over 130 pastimes including stool-ball and stow-ball. (Note: Willoughby's stow-ball was a golf-like game) It is significant in that it involved both a bat and base-running, although it was played with a wooden cat rather than a ball and the multiple "bases" were holes in the ground: the batter reached safety by putting the end of his bat in a hole before the fielders could put the cat in it. This has echoes in cricket's manner of scoring runs by touching the bat to the ground across the crease before the fielders can hit the nearby wicket with the ball.

=== Trap ball ===
In trap ball, played in England since the 14th century, a ball was thrown in the air, to be hit by a batsman and fielded. In some variants a member of the fielding team threw the ball in the air; in some, the batter tossed it himself as in fungo; in others, the batsman caused the ball to be tossed in the air by a simple lever mechanism: versions of this, called bat and trap and Knurr and spell, are still played in some English pubs. In trap-ball there was no running, instead the fielders attempted to throw the ball back to within a certain distance of the batter's station. Trap-ball may be the origin of the concept of foul lines; in most variants the ball had to be hit between two posts to count.

A related game was tip-cat; in this, the "cat" was an oblong piece of wood (as in dog-and-cat); it tapered toward each end, rather like a rugby ball or American football, so that striking one end would flip it into the air much like the trap in trap-ball so that it could be struck with a stick or bat.

=== Base ===
An old English game called "base" or "prisoners' base", described by George Ewing at Valley Forge, was apparently not much like baseball. There was no bat and no ball involved. The game was more like a fancy game of team "tag", although it did share the concept of places of safety, bases, with baseball.

=== Cricket ===
The history of cricket prior to 1650 is something of a mystery. Games believed to have been similar to cricket had developed by the 13th century. There was a game called "creag", and another game, "Handyn and Handoute" (Hands In and Hands Out), which was made illegal in 1477 by King Edward IV, who considered the game childish, and a distraction from compulsory archery practice.

References to a game actually called "cricket" appeared around 1550. It is believed that the word cricket is based either on the word cric, meaning a crooked stick (cognate with English crook): early forms of cricket used a curved bat somewhat like a hockey stick; or on a Middle Dutch phrase for hockey, met de (krik ket)sen ("with the stick chase"), or on the Flemish word "krickstoel", which refers to a stool upon which one kneels in church and which the early long, low wicket resembled. The word is etymologically related to French croquet- early forms of which were also played with a curved stick rather than a mallet.

The earliest known mention of baseball, as a children's game, dates from the same year (1744) in which the Artillery Ground Laws formalised the rules of what was already a first-class, professional sport sponsored by nobility and upon which vast wagers were laid.

English colonists played cricket along with their other games from home, and it is mentioned many times in 18th-century American sources. As an organized sport, the Toronto Cricket Club was established in that city by 1827 and the St George's Cricket Club was formed in 1838 in New York City (membership restricted to British-born men). Teams from the two clubs faced off in the first international cricket game in 1844 that Toronto won by 23 runs. Many of the early New York club baseball players were also cricketers, and the earliest recorded inter-club baseball game was played on the Union Star Cricket Grounds in Brooklyn.

=== Rounders ===
There’s the nostalgia, of course. The satisfying ‘thwack’ as heavy ball meets wooden bat; the lush green field dotted with coloured cones, shining under the British summer sun; the grass-stained knees as you slide valiantly past fourth base.

— Claire Cohen of The Telegraph on the gameplay of rounders having played it as a girl.

The Irish game of rounder is similar to baseball, and most mentioned as its ancestor or nearest relation, is rounders. Like baseball, the object is to strike a pitched ball with a bat and then run a circuit of four bases to score. The batter must strike at a good ball and run in an anti-clockwise direction around the first, second, and third base and home to the fourth, though they may stay at any of the first three. A batter is out if the ball is caught; if the base to which they are running to is touched with the ball; or if, while running, they are touched with the ball by a fielder. Nine players constitute a team, with the fielding side consisting of the bowler, the backstop (catcher), a player on each of the four bases, and three deep fielders. Popular among British and Irish school children, and especially among girls, as of 2015 rounders is played by seven million children in the UK.

In 1828, William Clarke in London published the second edition of The Boy's Own Book, which included the rules of rounders (in fact the earliest known use of that name), and the first printed description in English of a bat and ball base-running game played on a diamond. The following year, the book was published in Boston, Massachusetts. The exact same rules were reprinted verbatim in Robin Carver's The Book of Sports (Boston, 1834), except they were headed not "Rounders" but "Base, or Goal-ball."

=== British baseball ===
A unique British sport, known as British baseball, is still played in parts of Wales and England. Although confined mainly to the cities of Cardiff, Newport and Liverpool, the sport boasts an annual international game between representative teams from the two countries. British "baseball", however, is much more akin to rounders, as it was in fact called until 1892, and represents a rounders variant somewhat hybridized under the influence of 19th-century American touring teams; it is in fact the last survival in Great Britain of the once-widespread adult club rounders.

== Early mentions of baseball in Europe ==
According to many sources, the earliest appearance of the word "baseball" dates from 1700, when Anglican bishop Thomas Wilson expressed his disapproval of "Morris-dancing, cudgel-playing, baseball and cricket" occurring on Sundays. However, David Block, in Baseball Before We Knew It (2005), reports that the original source has "stoolball" for "baseball". Block also reports the reference appears to date to 1672, rather than 1700.

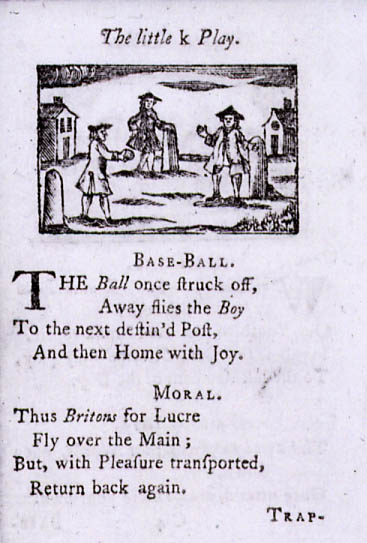
Woodcut from the 1744 British children's book A Little Pretty Pocket-Book, showing rounders posts and the first reference to baseball

A 1744 book in England by children's publisher John Newbery called A Little Pretty Pocket-Book includes a woodcut of a game similar to three-base stoolball or rounders and a rhyme entitled "Base-Ball". This is the first known instance of the word baseball in print. John Thorn, Major League Baseball's official historian, speculates that the game depicted may have involved hitting the ball with a bare hand, as in punchball, and that hitting with a bat may not have become established until later in the century.

In 1755, a book entitled The Card by John Kidgell, in volume 1 on page 9, mentions baseball: "the younger Part of the Family, perceiving Papa not inclined to enlarge upon the matter, retired to an interrupted Party at Base-Ball (an infant Game, which as it advances in its teens, improved into Fives)." (Note: Kidgell evidently was referring to the maturation of the children, not the game, as "Fives" was a five-on-a-side game resembling a hybrid of handball and tennis) Although A Little Pretty Pocket-Book first appeared eleven years earlier, no copies of the first or other early editions have surfaced to date, only the tenth and later editions from 1760 forward. Therefore, The Card was the oldest surviving reference to baseball until the Bray diary was discovered in 2008.

The earliest recorded game of base-ball involved the family of the Prince of Wales, played indoors in London in November 1748. The Prince is reported as playing "Bass-Ball" again in September 1749 in Walton-on-Thames, Surrey, against Lord Middlesex. The English lawyer William Bray wrote in his diary that he had played a game of baseball on Easter Monday 1755 in Guildford, also in Surrey. The word "baseball" first appeared in a dictionary in 1768, in A General Dictionary of the English Language compiled by the editors of the Encyclopædia Britannica (first published the same year), with the unhelpful definition "A rural game in which the person striking the ball must run to his base or goal."

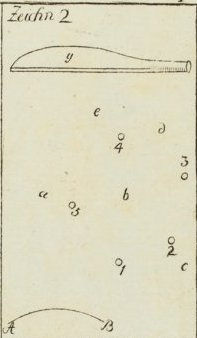
Gutsmuth's diagram of englische Base-ball, depicting the bat and the playing field.

By 1796, the rules of this English game were well enough established to earn a mention in the German Johann Christoph Friedrich GutsMuths' book on popular pastimes. In it he described "Ball mit Freystäten (oder das englische Base-ball)" ('Ball with safe places, or the English base-ball') as a contest between two teams in which "the batter has three attempts to hit the ball while at the home plate"; only one out was required to retire a side. Gutsmuth included a diagram of the field that was very similar to that of town ball. (Note: Although the inclusion of two flags marked between the bases on opposite sides of the field suggests the possibility that the batting position alternated, as in cricket.) Notably, Gutsmuths is the earliest author to explicitly mention the use of a bat, although in this case it was a flat wooden paddle about 18 inches long, swung one-handed.

The French book Les Jeux des Jeunes Garçons is the second known book to contain printed rules of a batting/base/running game. It was printed in Paris in 1810 and lays out the rules for La balle empoisonnée ("poisoned ball"), in which there were two teams of eight to ten players, four bases (one called home), a pitcher, a batter, "soaking" and flyball outs; however, the ball apparently was struck by the hand.

Another early print reference is Jane Austen's novel Northanger Abbey, originally written 1798–1799. In the first chapter the young English heroine Catherine Morland is described as preferring "cricket, base ball, riding on horseback and running about the country to books". David Block speculates that this version of baseball was also played without a bat. About the same time, Austen's cousin Cassandra Cooke mentioned baseball in her novel Battleridge.

In her 1820s "Village Sketch" Jack Hatch, author Mary Russell Mitford wrote:

Then comes a sun-burnt gipsy of six, beginning to grow tall and thin and to find the cares of the world gathering about her; with a pitcher in one hand, a mop in the other, an old straw bonnet of ambiguous shape, half hiding her tangled hair; a tattered stuff petticoat once green, hanging below an equally tattered cotton frock, once purple; her longing eyes fixed on a game of baseball at the corner of the green till she reaches the cottage door, flings down the mop and pitcher and darts off to her companions quite regardless of the storm of scolding with which the mother follows her runaway steps.

In 1828, William Clarke of London published the second edition of The Boy's Own Book, which included the earliest known mention of a game called "rounders," and contains under that heading the first printed description in English of a bat and ball base-running game played on a diamond. The following year, the book was published in Boston, Massachusetts. Similar rules were published in Boston in The Book of Sports, written by Robin Carver in 1834, except Carver called the game "Base or Goal ball". Clarke's "rounders" description would be reprinted many times on both sides of the Atlantic in ensuing decades, under various names.

== Early baseball in North America ==
Charting the evolution of the game that became modern baseball is difficult before 1845. The Knickerbocker Rules describe a game that had been played for some time, but for how long is uncertain. There were once two camps. One, mostly English, asserted that baseball evolved from a game of English origin (probably rounders); the other, almost entirely American, said that baseball was an American invention (perhaps derived from the game of one-ol'-cat). Apparently they saw their positions as mutually exclusive. Some of their points seem more national loyalty than evidence.

Americans tended to reject any suggestion that baseball evolved from an English game, while some English observers concluded that baseball was little more than their rounders without the round. One English author went so far as to declare that the Knickerbocker Club comprised English expatriates who introduced "their" game to America for the first time in 1845. The Mills Commission, at the other extreme, created an "official" and entirely fictional All-American version attributing the game's invention to Abner Doubleday in 1839 at Cooperstown, New York (current site of the National Baseball Hall of Fame and Museum).

Both were entirely wrong, since this much is clear: baseball, or a game called "base ball", had been played in America for many years by then. The earliest explicit reference to the game in America is from March 1786 in the diary of a student at Princeton, John Rhea Smith: "A fine day, play baste ball in the campus but am beaten for I miss both catching and striking the ball." There is a possible reference a generation older, from Harvard; describing the campus buttery in the 1760s, Sidney Willard wrote "Besides eatables, everything necessary for a student was there sold, and articles used in the playgrounds, such as bats, balls etc. ... Here it was that we wrestled and ran, played at quoits and cricket, and various games of bat and ball."

A 1791 bylaw in Pittsfield, Massachusetts banned the playing of "any game of wicket, cricket, baseball, batball, football, cats, fives, or any other game played with ball" within 80 yards of the town meeting house to prevent damage to its windows. Worcester, Massachusetts outlawed playing baseball "in the streets" in 1816.

There are other mentions of baseball during the early 19th century. An advertisement for Kensington House in the New York Evening Post dated June 6, 1821, said "The grounds of Kensington House are spacious, and well adapted to the playing the noble game of cricket, base, trap-ball, quoits and other amusements, and all the apparatus necessary for the above games will be furnished to clubs and parties."

The April 25, 1823 edition of the (New York) National Advocate included this:

I was last Saturday much pleased in witnessing a company of active young men playing the manly and athletic game of 'base ball' at the Retreat in Broadway (Jones'). I am informed they are an organized association, and that a very interesting game will be played on Saturday next at the above place, to commence at half past 3 o'clock, P.M. Any person fond of witnessing this game may avail himself of seeing it played with consummate skill and wonderful dexterity. (Note: This paragraph is notable in particular for "organized association", since it dates club baseball in New York back two decades before the Knickerbockers.)

Two years later the following notice appeared in the July 13, 1825 edition of the Delhi (New York) Gazette: "The undersigned, all residents of the new town of Hamden, with the exception of Asa Howland, who has recently removed into Delhi, challenge an equal number of persons of any town in the County of Delaware, to meet them at any time at the house of Edward B. Chace, in said town, to play the game of Bass-Ball, for the sum of one dollar each per game."

Thurlow Weed in his memoir recalled organized club baseball in Rochester, New York in 1825:

Though an industrious and busy place, its citizens found leisure for rational and healthy recreation. A base-ball club, numbering nearly fifty members, met every afternoon during the ball-playing season. Though the members of the club embraced persons between eighteen and forty, it attracted the young and the old.

The first recorded game of baseball under the later codified rules was played in New York on September 23, 1845, between the New York Baseball Club and the Knickerbocker Baseball Club. American baseball was allegedly played in Beachville, Ontario in 1838. However, there is no consensus as to the rules that were used or whether it can be considered the first "baseball" game. A firsthand account and the rules of the game were recalled by Dr. Adam E. Ford, who had witnessed the game as a six-year-old boy, in an 1886 issue of The Sporting Life magazine in Denver, Colorado; he described the game in remarkable detail, including the precise distances between the irregular bases and how the ball was constructed. However, some historians, such as David Block, have expressed doubts as to the veracity and rather incredible specificity of Ford's memory, and indeed compared it to Abner Graves' very similar yarn about Abner Doubleday.

In that letter, Ford refers to 'old grayhairs' at the time, who had played this game as children, suggesting that the origins of baseball in Canada go back into the 18th century. Very similar instances were recorded by John Montgomery Ward in his 1888 book Base-Ball: How to Become a Player, with the Origins, History and Explanation of the Game, in which he recounts several elderly men recalling having played as boys, covering a span from the 1790s to the 1830s; among others, Oliver Wendell Holmes Sr. recalled playing at Harvard, from which he graduated in 1829.

=== Cricket and rounders ===
That baseball is based on older English games such as stool-ball, trap-ball and tip-cat with possible influences from cricket is difficult to dispute. On the other hand, baseball as played in the New World has many elements that are uniquely American. The earliest published author to muse on the origin of baseball, John Montgomery Ward, was suspicious of the often-parroted claim that rounders is the direct ancestor of baseball, as both were formalized in the same time period. He concluded, with some amount of patriotism, that baseball evolved separately from town-ball (i.e. rounders), out of children's "safe haven" ball games.

Games played with bat-and-ball together may all be distant cousins; the same goes for base-and-ball games. Bat, base, and ball games for two teams that alternate in and out, such as baseball, cricket, and rounders, are likely to be close cousins. They all involve throwing a ball to a batsman who attempts to "bat" it away and run safely to a base, while the opponent tries to put the batter-runner out when liable ("liable [to be put out]" is the baseball term for unsafe). Certainly, baseball is related to cricket and rounders, but exactly how, or how closely, has not been established. The only certain thing is that cricket is much older than baseball, and that cricket was very popular in colonial America and the early United States, fading only with the explosive popularity of New York baseball after the Civil War. Baseball owes to cricket some adopted terminology, such as "outs", "innings", "runs" and "umpires". There was also, "wicket", a countrified form of cricket once very popular in New England, which retained the old-fashioned wide, low two-stump wicket, and in which the large ball was rolled along the ground.

The likelihood is that "base ball" and "rounders" (along with "feeder," "squares" and other names) were regional appellations for the same boys' game played with varying rules in many parts of England from the early 1700s onward. Along with its relatives stool-ball and the cat games it crossed the ocean with English colonists, and eventually followed its own independent evolutionary path, at the same time that back in England what was now generally called "rounders" was developing separately.

=== Cat, One old cat ===
The game of "cat" (or "cat-ball") had many variations but usually there was a pitcher, a catcher, a batter and fielders, but there were no sides (and often no bases to run). Often, as in English tip-cat, there was no pitcher and the "cat" was not a ball but an oblong wooden object, roughly football-shaped, which could be flipped into the air by striking one end, or simply a short stick which could be placed over a hole or stone and similarly flipped up. In other variants the batter himself tossed the ball into the air with his free hand, as in fungo. A feature of some versions of cat that would later become a feature of baseball was that a batter would be out if he swung and missed three times.

Another game that was popular in early America was "one ol' cat", the name of which was possibly originally a contraction of one hole catapult. (Note: David Block's father recalled playing a street game in Brooklyn circa 1915 in which a piece of broomstick was catapulted into the air in like manner, to be struck with the rest of the broomstick; Block Sr. and his chums knew the game as "One Ol' Cat".) In one ol' cat, when a batter is put out, the catcher goes to bat, the pitcher catches, a fielder becomes the pitcher, and other fielders move up in rotation. One ol' cat was often played when there weren't enough players to choose up sides and play townball. Sometimes running to a base and back was involved. "Two ol' cat" was the same game as one ol' cat, except that there were two batters; a diagram preserved in the New York Public Library is labeled "Four Old Cat" and depicts a square field like a baseball diamond and four batters, one at each corner.

=== Bat and ball ===
There are numerous 18th and early 19th-century references in England and especially America to "bat and ball". Unfortunately, there is no knowledge and information about the game besides the name, nor whether it was an alternate term for baseball or something else such as trap-ball, cat or even cricket. It might merely be a generic phrase for any game played with bat and ball. However, in 1859, Alfred Elwyn recalled of his childhood in New Hampshire in the 1810s:

The one we call 'bat and ball' may be an imperfect form of cricket, though we played this [cricket] in the same or nearly the same manner as in England, which would make it probable that the 'bat and ball' was a game of Yankee invention. [S]ides were chosen, not limited to any particular number, though seldom more than six or eight. ... The individual ... first chosen, of the side that was in, took the bat position at a certain assigned spot. One of his adversaries stood at a given distance in front of him to throw the ball, and another behind him to throw back the ball if it were not struck, or to catch it. ... After the ball was struck, the striker was to run; stones were placed some thirty or forty feet apart, in a circle, and he was to touch each one of them, till he got back to the front from which he started. If the ball was caught by any of the opposite party who were in the field, or if not caught, was thrown at and hit the boy who was trying to get back to his starting place, their party was in; and the boy who caught the ball, or hit his opponent, took the bat. A good deal of fun and excitement consisted in the ball not having been struck to a sufficient distance to admit of the striker running round before the ball was in the hands of his adversaries. If his successor struck it, he must run, and take his chance, evading the ball as well as he could by falling down or dodging it. While at the goals he could not be touched; only in the intervals between them.

This "bat and ball," at least, appears very clearly to be a form of early baseball/roundball/townball.

=== Town ball, round ball, Massachusetts base ball ===
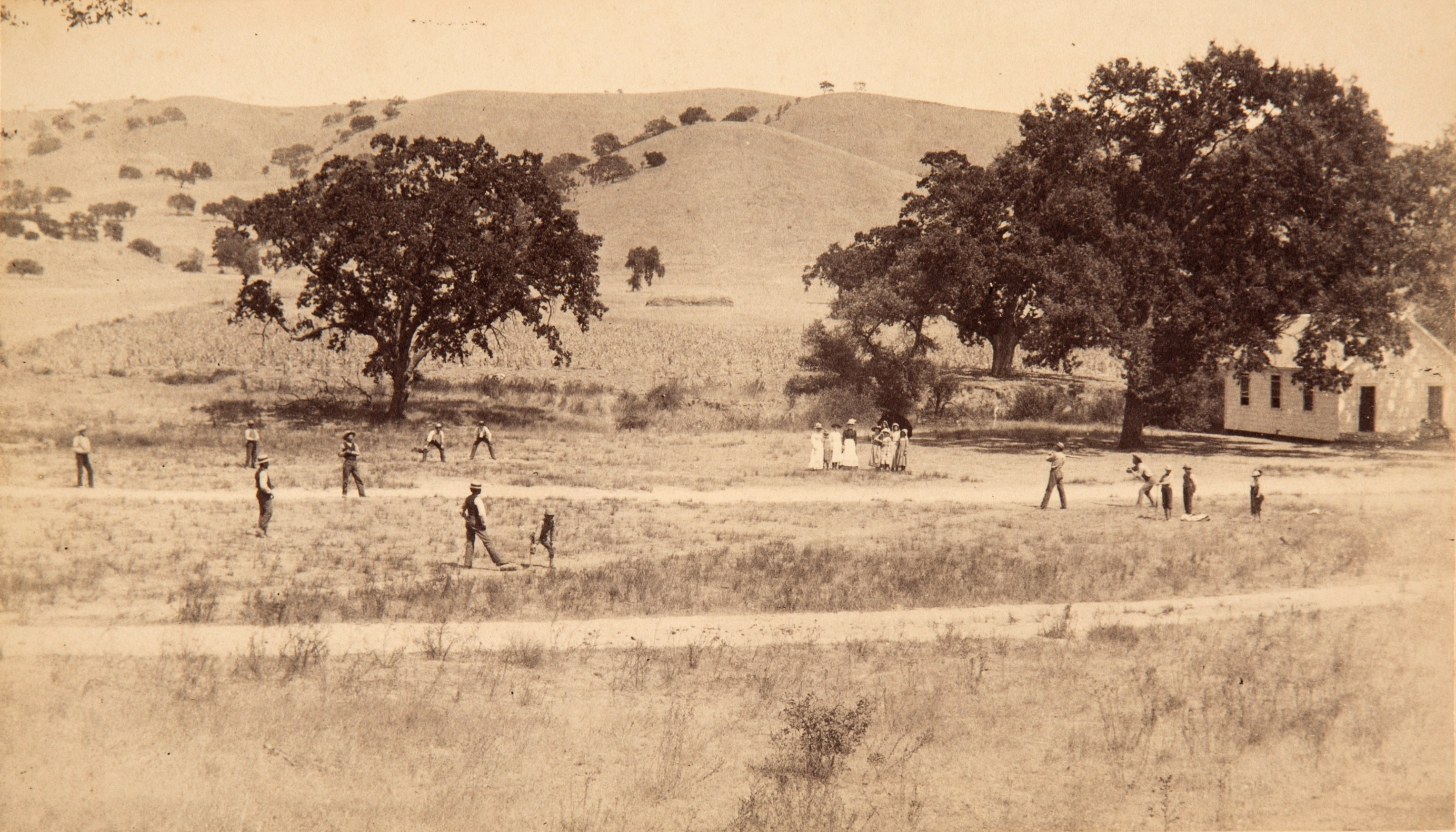
Ballgame in California, 1860s

Baseball, as it was before the rise to dominance of its altered New York variant in the 1850s and 60s, was known variously as base ball, town ball, round ball, (Note: Possibly a link to rounders, as the "round" is unlikely to be a redundant reference to the ball) round town, goal ball, field-base, three-corner cat, the New England game, or Massachusetts baseball. Generally speaking, "round-ball" was the most usual name in New England, "base-ball" in New York, and "town-ball" in Pennsylvania and the South. A diagram posted in the baseball collection on the New York Public Library's Digital Gallery website identifies a game played, "Eight Boys with a ball & four bats playing [F]our Old Cat" (Note: In the diagram there is a type-over that makes the first letter of the name of the game hard to distinguish. The caption provided by the NYPL interprets the note as saying Your Old Cat, but it is likely this is actually Four Old Cat.) This game was apparently played on a square of 40 feet on each side, but the diagram does not make clear the rules or how to play the game. The same sheet of paper shows a diagram of a square – 60 feet per side with the base side having in its middle the "Home Goal", "Catcher", and "Striker", and with the corners marked as "1st Goal", "2nd Goal", "3rd Goal", and "4th Goal" as you travel counter-clockwise around the square. The note accompanying this diagram says, "Thirty or more players (15 or more on each side) with a bat and ball playing Town Ball, some times called Round Ball, and subsequently the so-called Massachusetts game of Base Ball".

Early baseball or town-ball had many, many variants, as would be expected of an informal boys' game, and most differed in several particulars from the game which developed in New York in the 1840s. Besides usually (but not always) being played on a 'rectangle' rather than a 'diamond,' with the batter positioned between fourth and first base (there were also variants with three and five bases), it was played by various numbers of players from six to over thirty a side, in most but not all versions there was no foul territory and every batted ball was in play, (Note: A common tactic was for the batter to attempt to flip the ball backwards over the catcher's head) innings were determined on the basis of either "all out/all out" as in cricket or "one out/all out", in many all out/all out versions there was an opportunity for the last batter to earn another inning by some prodigious feat of hitting, pitching was overhand (underhand pitching was mandatory in "New York" baseball until the 1880s), (Note: The terms "pitch" and "pitcher" themselves are survivors of that era, since "pitch" had always meant an underhand toss as in horseshoes; in most accounts of townball the position was called the "thrower" or "server.") and, perhaps most significantly, a baserunner was put out by "soaking" or hitting him with a thrown ball, just as in French poison-ball and Gutsmuth's englische Base-ball.

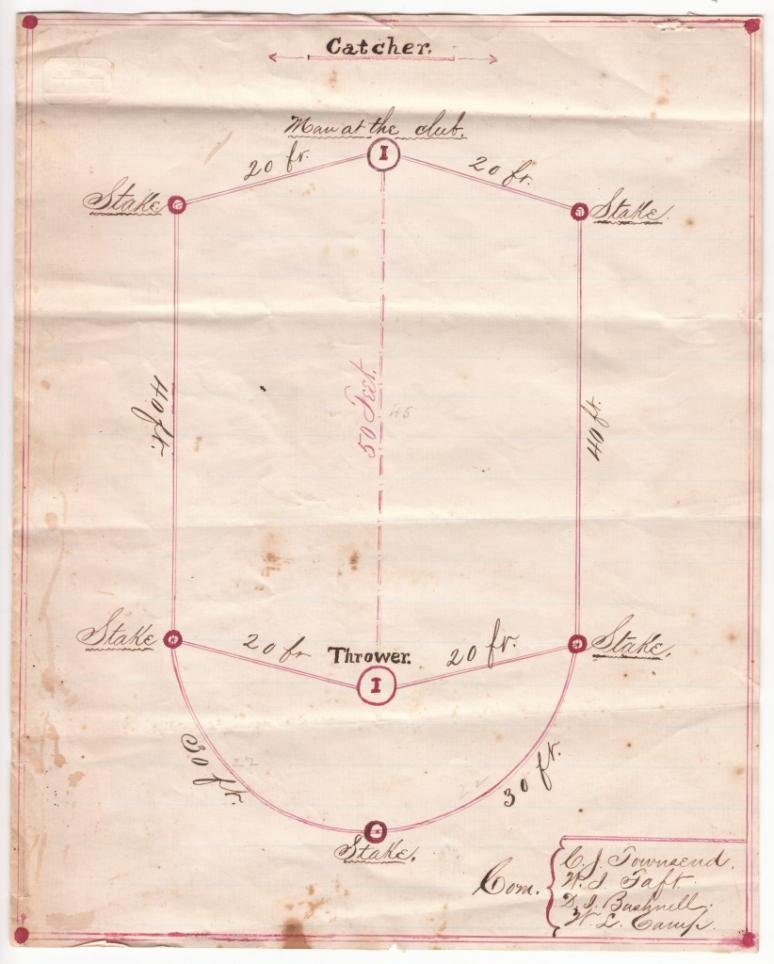
Playing field diagram from the “Rules and Regulations of the New Marlboro.’ Match Base Ball Co.”

As mentioned above, in 1829 The Boy's Own Book was reprinted in Boston, including the rules of rounders, and Robin Carver's 1834 The Book of Sports copied the same rules almost verbatim but changed "Rounders" to "Base or Goal ball" because, as the preface states, those "are the names generally adopted in this country" – which also implies that the game was "generally" known and played. In 1833 the Olympic Ball Club of Philadelphia was organized, (Note: The Olympics, however, played their first games across the river in Camden, NJ, due to a Philadelphia ordinance against ball games) and by 1837 the Gotham Base Ball Club would be formed in Manhattan, which would later split to form the Knickerbocker Club.

1835 saw the publication of Boy's Book of Sports which, confusingly, has chapters for both "Base ball" and "Base, or Goal-ball", which seem to be little if at all different; both were "all out, all out" townball with soaking and a three-strike rule. Of more interest is the fact that here appears the earliest use of the terms "innings" and "diamond".

The early 1840s saw the formation of at least three more clubs in Manhattan, the New York, (Note: It is however possible that the "New York" and "Gotham" clubs were one and the same. The interrelationships of the clubs named New York, Gotham and Washington are complex and not well understood by sports historians.) the Eagle and the Magnolia; another in Philadelphia, the Athletic; and even a club in Cincinnati. By 1851 the game of baseball was well-established enough that a newspaper report of a game played by a group of teamsters on Christmas Day referred to the game as "a good old-fashioned game of base ball", and the 1858 report of the National Association of Base Ball Players declared that "The game of base-ball has long been a favorite and popular recreation in this country, but it is only within the last fifteen years that any attempt has been made to systematize and regulate the game."

The older game was recognized as being very different in character from the new "Knickerbocker" style. The New York Clipper of October 10, 1857, reported on a match between the Liberty Club of New Jersey and "a party of Old Fogies who were in the habit of playing the old fashioned base ball, which as nearly everyone knows, is entirely different from the base ball as now played." In 1860, the Olympic Ball Club of Philadelphia voted to change over to the "New York game", several traditionalist members resigned in protest. That same year the rival Athletic Club traveled to Mauch Chunk, Pennsylvania for a challenge match in which they competed against the local club in both town ball (the home team prevailed, 45–43), and "New York" baseball (Athletic won easily, 34–2).

Round-ball persisted in New England longer than in other regions and during the period of overlap was sometimes distinguished as the "New England game" or "Massachusetts baseball"; in 1858 a set of rules was drawn up by the Massachusetts Association of Base Ball Players at the Phoenix Hotel in Dedham. This game was played by teams of ten to fourteen players with four bases 60 feet apart and no foul territory. The ball was considerably smaller and lighter than a modern baseball, and runners were still put out by "soaking".

== Abner Doubleday myth ==
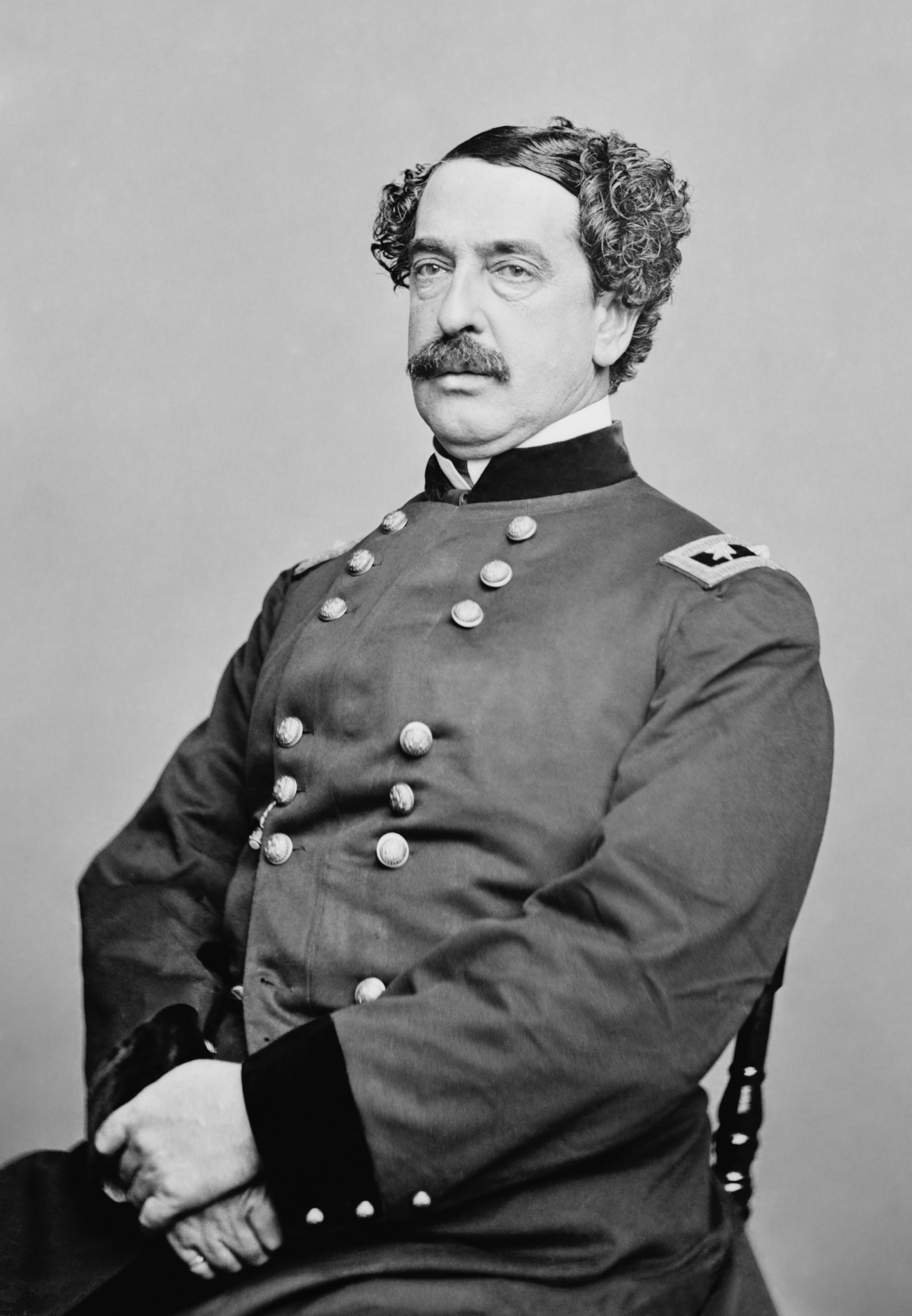
Abner Doubleday

The myth that Abner Doubleday invented baseball in 1839 was once widely promoted and widely believed. There is no evidence for this claim except for the testimony of one unreliable man decades later, and there is persuasive counter-evidence. Doubleday himself never made such a claim; he left many letters and papers, but they contain no description of baseball or any suggestion that he considered himself prominent in the game's history. His New York Times obituary makes no mention of baseball, nor does a 1911 Encyclopædia article about Doubleday. The story was attacked by baseball writers almost as soon as it came out, but it had the weight of Major League Baseball and the Spalding publishing empire behind it. Contrary to popular belief, Doubleday was never inducted into the Baseball Hall of Fame, although a large oil portrait of him was on display at the Hall of Fame building for many years.

Doubleday's invention of baseball was the finding of a panel appointed by Albert Spalding, a former star pitcher and club executive, who had become the leading American sporting goods entrepreneur and sports publisher. Debate on baseball's origins had raged for decades, heating up in the first years of the 20th century, due in part to a 1903 essay baseball historian Henry Chadwick wrote in Spalding's Official Baseball Guide stating that baseball gradually evolved from English game of “rounders”. To end argument, speculation, and innuendo, Spalding organized the Mills Commission in 1905. The members were baseball figures, not historians: Spalding's friend Abraham G. Mills, a former National League president; two United States Senators, former NL president Morgan Bulkeley and former Washington club president Arthur Gorman; former NL president and lifelong secretary-treasurer Nick Young; two other star players turned sporting goods entrepreneurs (George Wright and Alfred Reach); and AAU president James E. Sullivan. (Note: This list of panelists and the organization and publication dates follow "The Mills Commission" in "The Origins of the National Baseball Hall of Fame and Museum" by that institution. The Hall and Museum owes its Cooperstown location and its 1839 birth date, at least, to the Mills Commission finding.)

The final report, published on December 30, 1907, included three sections: a summary of the panel's findings written by Mills, a letter by John Montgomery Ward supporting the panel, and a dissenting opinion by Henry Chadwick. The research methods were, at best, dubious. Mills was a close friend of Doubleday, and upon Doubleday's death in 1893 Mills orchestrated his memorial service and burial. Doubleday had been a prominent member of the spiritualist Theosophical Society, in which Spalding's wife was deeply involved and in whose compound in San Diego Spalding was residing at the time. Wright and Reach were effectively Spalding's employees, as he had secretly bought out their sporting-goods businesses some years before. AAU president and Commission secretary Sullivan was Spalding's personal factotum. Several other members had personal reasons to declare baseball as an "American" game, such as Spalding's strong American imperialist views. The Commission found an appealing story: baseball was invented in a quaint rural town without foreigners or industry, by a young man who later graduated from West Point and served heroically in the Mexican–American War, Civil War, and U.S. wars against Indians.

The Mills Commission concluded that Doubleday had invented baseball in Cooperstown, New York in 1839; that Doubleday had invented the word "baseball", designed the diamond, indicated fielders' positions, and written the rules. No written records in the decade between 1839 and 1849 have ever been found to corroborate these claims, nor could Doubleday be interviewed (he died in 1893). The principal source for the story was one letter from elderly Abner Graves, who was a five-year-old resident of Cooperstown in 1839. Graves never mentioned a diamond, positions or the writing of rules. What's more, his reliability as a witness was challenged because he spent his final days in an asylum for the criminally insane. Doubleday was not in Cooperstown in 1839 and may never have visited the town. He was enrolled at West Point at the time, and there is no record of any leave time. Mills, a lifelong friend of Doubleday, never heard him mention baseball, nor is there any mention of the game in Doubleday's autobiography. In character, Doubleday was bookish and sedentary, with no observable interest in athletics of any sort.

Versions of baseball rules and descriptions of similar games have been found in publications that significantly predate his alleged invention in 1839. Despite this, the ballpark built in 1939 only a few blocks down from the Hall of Fame still bears the name "Doubleday Field". However, aside from the artificial intrusion of the person of Doubleday and the village of Cooperstown, the Mills report was not entirely incorrect in its broad outline: a game related to English rounders was played in America from early times; it was supplanted by a variant form which originated in New York circa 1840. But this development happened in urban New York City, not pastoral Cooperstown, and the men involved were neither farm boys nor West Point cadets.

== Knickerbocker rules ==
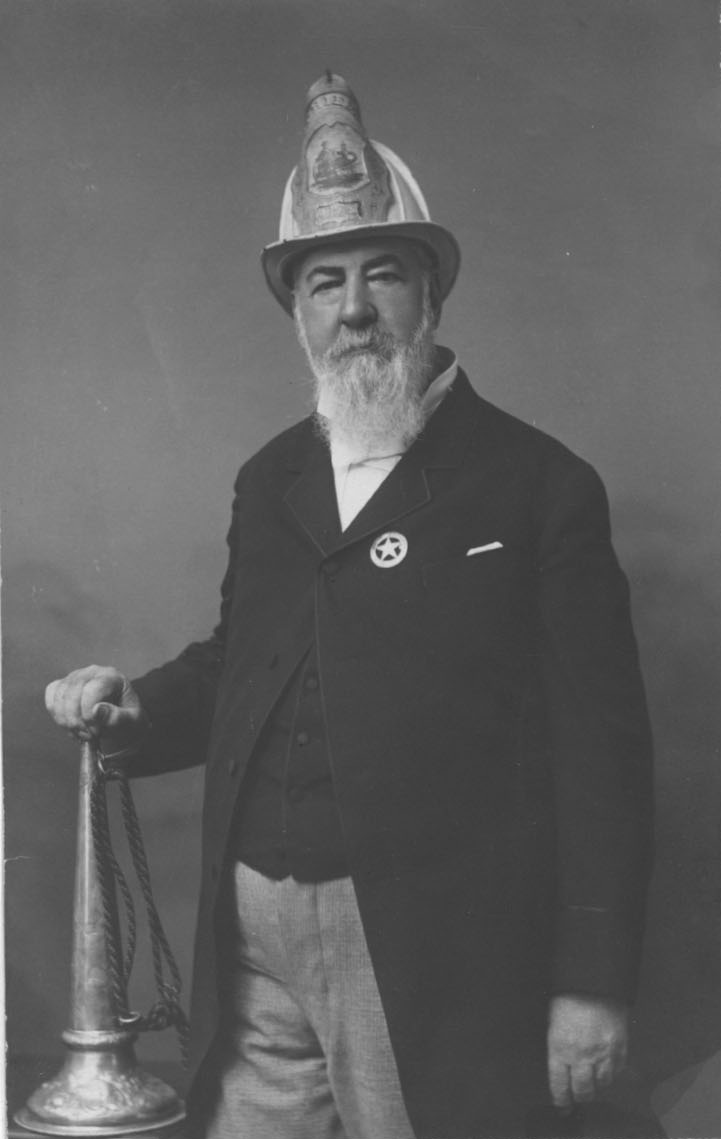
Alexander Cartwright

The earliest known published (Note: The 1845 rules were recorded at the time in manuscript form in the Club Game Book; they would not be published until 1848 and then in slightly amended form.) rules of baseball in the United States were written in 1845 for a New York City "base ball" club called the Knickerbockers. The purported organizer of the club, Alexander Cartwright, is one person commonly known as "the father of baseball". The rules themselves were written by the two-man Committee on By-Laws, Vice-president William R. Wheaton and Secretary William H. Tucker. One important rule, the 13th, outlawed "soaking" or "plugging", putting a runner out by hitting him with a thrown ball, introducing instead the concept of the tag; this reflected the use of a farther-traveling and potentially injurious hard ball. (Note: According to Ford's account of the 1838 Beachville game, "I will remember when some fellows down at or near New York got up the game of base ball that ... was played with a ball hard as a stick. India rubber had come into use, and they put so much into the balls to make them lively that when the fellow tossed it to you ... you could knock it so far that the fielders would be chasing it yet, like dogs hunting sheep, after you had gone clear around and scored your tally.") Another significant rule, the 15th, specified three outs to an inning for the first time instead of "one out, all out" or "all out, all out." The 10th rule prescribed foul lines and foul balls and the 18th forbade runners advancing on a foul, unlike the "Massachusetts game" in which all batted balls were in play. The Knickerbockers also enlarged the diamond well beyond that of town ball, possibly to modern size depending on how "paces" is interpreted. (Note: The 4th Rule specified the distance from first to third, and home to second, as being 42 paces. If a "pace" is taken to be the same as a yard, three feet, then the distance would have been 126 feet, or 89 feet between bases. However, most contemporary sources, such as Noah Webster's dictionary, considered a "pace" to be two and a half feet, meaning the base distance would have been about 75 feet (still larger than townball's typical 40 to 60).)

Evolution from the so-called "Knickerbocker Rules" to the current rules is fairly well documented. The most significant differences were that overhand pitching was illegal, strikes were only counted if the batter swung and missed, "wides" or balls were not counted at all, a batted ball caught on the first bounce was an out, and a game was played to 21 "aces" or runs rather than for a set number of innings.

It is noteworthy, however, that the Knickerbocker Rules did not cover a number of basic elements of the game. For example, there was no mention of positions or the number of players on a side, the pitching distance was unspecified, the direction of base-running was left open, and it was never stated, though implied, that an "ace" was scored by crossing home plate. In all likelihood, all of these matters except the first were considered so intrinsic to baseball by this time that they were assumed; the number of players on a side, however, remained a matter of debate among clubs (Note: Or were simply variable depending on how many players were available; during their first decade the Knicks played games with as few as seven and as many as thirteen on a side.) until fixed at nine in 1857, the Knickerbockers arguing unsuccessfully for seven-man teams.

On June 3, 1953, Congress officially credited Cartwright with inventing the modern game of baseball. He was already a member of the Baseball Hall of Fame, having been inducted in 1938 for various other contributions to baseball. However, the role of Cartwright himself in the game's invention has been disputed. According to Major League Baseball's official historian, John Thorn, "Cartwright's plaque in the Baseball Hall of Fame declares he set the bases 90 feet apart and established nine innings as a game and nine players as a team. He did none of these things, and every other word of substance on his plaque is false." His authorship may have been exaggerated in a modern attempt to identify a single inventor of the game, and heavily advanced by a relentless public-relations campaign by his grandson. The 1845 Rules themselves are signed by the "Committee on By-Laws", William R. Wheaton and William H. Tucker. There is evidence that these rules had been experimented with and used by New York ball clubs for some time; Cartwright, in his 1848 capacity as club secretary (and a bookseller), was merely the first to have them printed up.

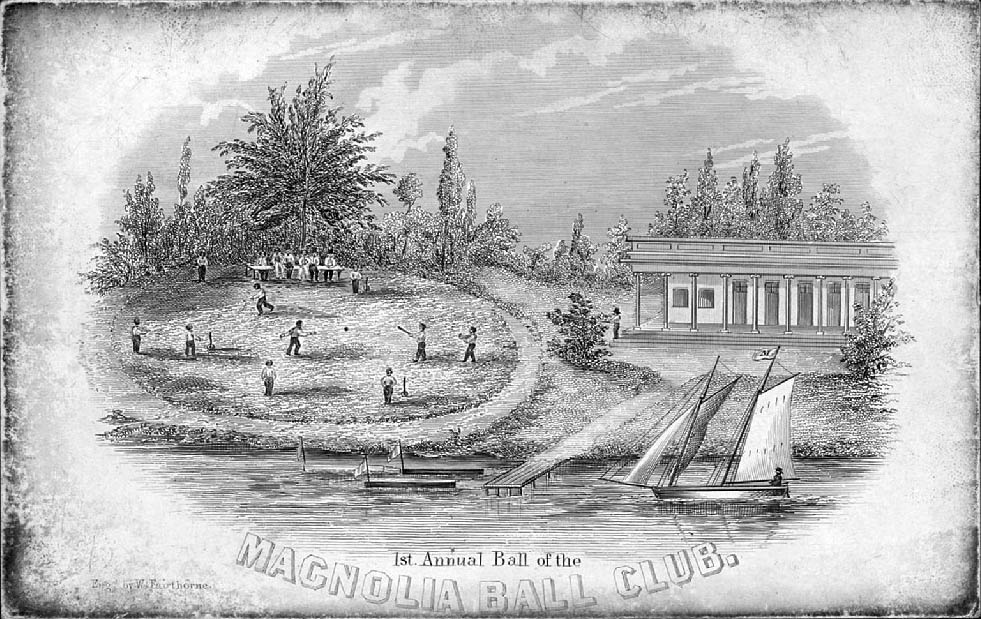
Ticket to the inaugural ball of the (New York) Magnolia Ball Club, ca. 1843. This engraving, which precedes the Knickerbockers' founding by at least a year, is the earliest known image of grown men playing baseball.

Further evidence of a more collective model of New York baseball's development, and doubts as to Cartwright's role as "inventor", came with the 2004 discovery of a newspaper interview with William R. Wheaton, a founding member of the Gotham Baseball Club in 1837 and first vice president of the Knickerbocker Club, and co-author of its rules, eight years later.

Three-cornered cat [ie. town ball, roundball] was a boy's game, and did well enough for slight youngsters, but it was a dangerous game for powerful men, because the ball was thrown to put out a man between bases, and it had to hit the runner to put him out. The ball was made of a hard rubber center, tightly wrapped with yarn, and in the hands of a strong-armed man it was a terrible missile, and sometimes had fatal results when it came in contact with a delicate part of the player's anatomy ...

We had to have a good outdoor game, and as the games then in vogue didn't suit us we decided to remodel three-cornered cat and make a new game. We first organized what we called the Gotham Baseball Club. This was the first ball organization in the United States, (Note: Actually the Olympic Club of Philadelphia was already in existence) and it was completed in 1837. The first step we took in making baseball was to abolish the rule of throwing the ball at the runner and ordered instead that it should be thrown to the baseman instead, who had to touch the runner before he reached the base. During the regime of three-cornered cat there were no regular bases, but only such permanent objects as a bedded boulder or and old stump, and often the diamond looked strangely like an irregular polygon. We laid out the ground at Madison Square in the form of an accurate diamond, with home-plate and sand bags for bases ...

It was found necessary to reduce the new rules to writing. This work fell to my hands, and the code I then formulated is substantially that in use today. We abandoned the old rule of putting out on the first bound and confined it to fly catching. The new game quickly became very popular with New Yorkers, and the numbers of the club soon swelled beyond the fastidious notions of some of us, and we decided to withdraw and found a new organization, which we called the Knickerbocker.

If Wheaton's account, given in 1887, was correct, then most of the innovations credited to Cartwright were, in fact, the work of the Gothams before the Knickerbockers were formed, including a set of written rules. John Thorn, MLB's official historian, argued in his book Baseball in the Garden of Eden that four members of the Knickerbockers, namely Wheaton, Louis F. Wadsworth, Daniel "Doc" Adams and William H. Tucker, have stronger claims than Cartwright as "inventors" of modern baseball. (Note: Further support for this view is found in a 1905 interview with founding Knickerbocker president and former Gotham Duncan Curry: "William Wheaton, William H Tucker and I drew up the first set of rules and the game was developed by the men who played it.")

Legend holds that Cartwright also introduced the game in most of the towns where he stopped on his trek west to California to find gold, a sort of Johnny Appleseed of baseball. This story, however, arose from forged entries in Cartwright's diary which were inserted after his death.

It is however certain that Cartwright, a New York bookseller who later caught gold fever, umpired a game in Hoboken, New Jersey on June 19, 1846. The game ended, and the Knickerbockers' opponents (the New York nine) (Note: Most modern accounts capitalize "Nine" as if it were a team name, but in the original it is in lower case and is just a way of saying "nine men;" cf. the opening line of Casey at the Bat, "The outlook wasn't brilliant for the Mudville nine that day." The club itself was in all likelihood the New York Ball Club which had been founded in the 1830s and which participated in the October 1845 Elysian Fields game) won, 23–1. This was long believed to be the first recorded U.S. baseball game between organized clubs. However, at least three earlier reported games have since been discovered: on October 10, 1845, a game was played between the New York Ball Club and an unnamed (Note: But almost certainly the Star Cricket Club) club from Brooklyn, at the Union Star Cricket Grounds in Brooklyn; the New Yorks lost, 22 to 1. The game was reported in the New York Morning News and True Sun, making it the first ever published baseball result. The New Yorks and Brooklyns played two more games on October 21 and 24, with the first on the New Yorks' home diamond at Elysian Fields and the rematch at the Star Cricket Grounds again. (Note: The True Sun account of the first game read "The Base Ball match between eight Brooklyn players, and eight players of New York, came off on Friday on the grounds of the Union Star Cricket Club. The Yorkers were singularly unfortunate in scoring but one run in their three innings. Brooklyn scored 22 and of course came off winners.") (Note: It is entirely possible, even likely, that the second (Hoboken) game is the same as that described by Wheaton in his Chronicle interview: “The Gothams played a game of ball with the Star Cricket Club of Brooklyn and beat the Englishmen out of sight, of course.” The umpire in the 1845 game reported in the Morning News was none other than William R. Wheaton.)

One point undisputed by historians is that the modern professional major leagues that began in the 1870s developed directly from the amateur urban clubs of the 1840s and 1850s, not from the pastures of small towns such as Cooperstown.

== Elysian Fields ==
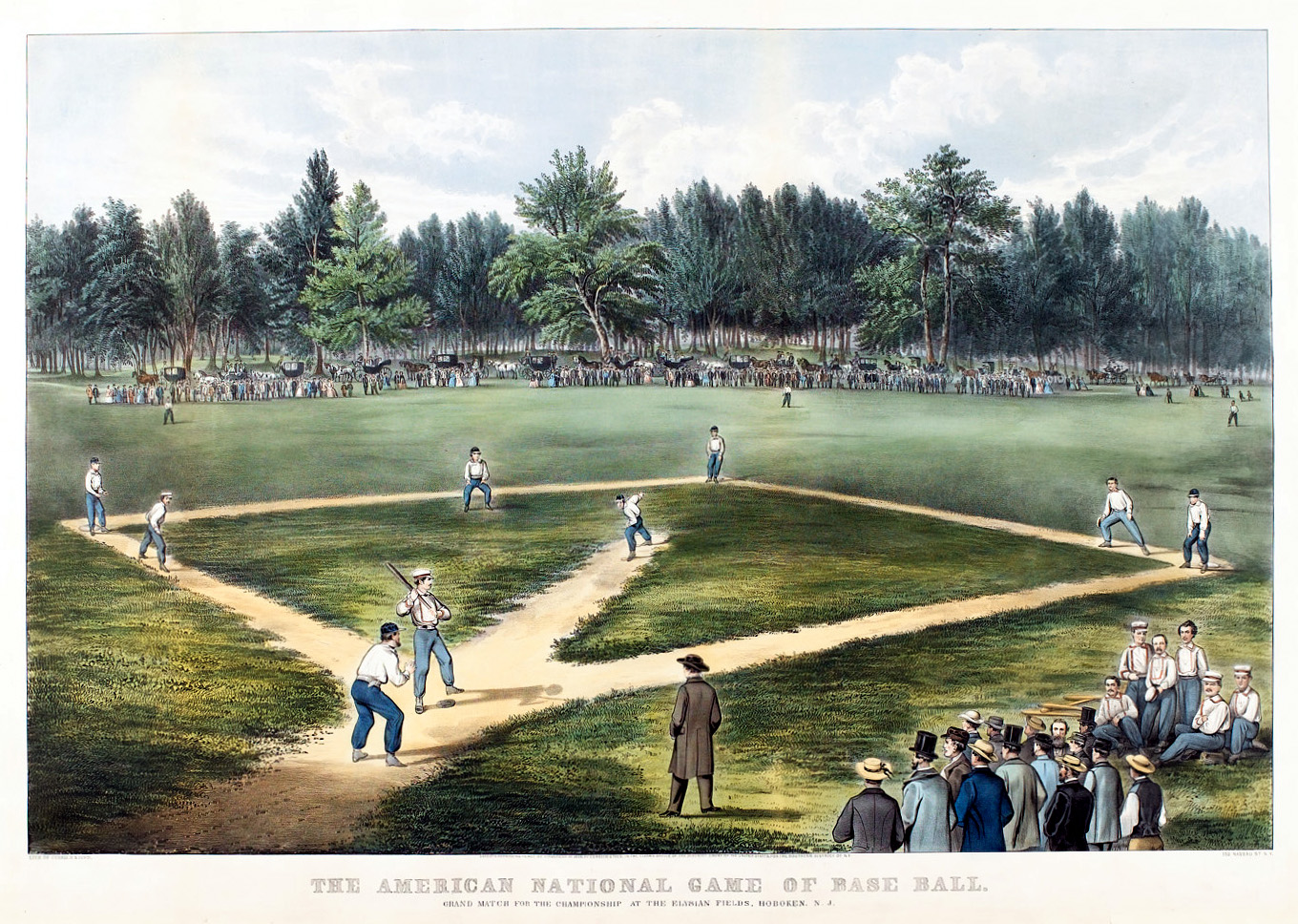
Early baseball game played at Elysian Fields, Hoboken (Currier & Ives lithograph).

In 1845, the Knickerbocker Club began using Elysian Fields in Hoboken to play baseball, following the New York and Magnolia Ball Clubs which had begun playing there in 1843.

At a preliminary meeting [of the Knickerbockers], it was suggested that as it was apparent they would soon be driven from Murray Hill, some suitable place should be obtained in New Jersey, where their stay could be permanent; accordingly, a day or two afterwards, enough to make a game assembled at Barclay street ferry, crossed over, marched up the road, prospecting for ground on each side, until they reached the Elysian Fields, where they "settled."

On October 21, 1845, the New York Ball Club played the second of their three games against a Brooklyn team there, the series being the first known inter-club baseball games. In June 1846 the Knickerbockers played the "New York nine" (probably the same New York Ball Club) in the first baseball game played between clubs according to codified rules. A plaque and baseball diamond street pavings at 11th and Washington Streets commemorate the event. By the 1850s, several Manhattan-based members of the National Association of Base Ball Players were using the grounds as their home field.

In 1865 the grounds hosted a championship match between the Mutual Club of New York and the Atlantic Club of Brooklyn that was attended by an estimated 20,000 fans and captured in the Currier & Ives lithograph The American National Game of Base Ball.

With the construction of two significant baseball parks enclosed by fences in Brooklyn, enabling promoters there to charge admission to games; the prominence of Elysian Fields began to diminish. In 1868 the leading Manhattan club, Mutual, shifted its home games to the Union Grounds in Brooklyn. In 1880, the founders of the professional National League's New York club and the Metropolitan Club of the American Association finally succeeded in siting a ballpark in Manhattan at the former Polo Grounds on 110th Street.

== After 1845 ==
The Knickerbockers published their rulebook in 1848, including one significant change: the introduction of the force-out, but only at first base. In 1852, the Eagle Club published their rules, and two years later the Knickerbockers, Eagles and Gothams met and agreed to a uniform set of rules to govern all three clubs, at least in match play, which for the first time set the pitching distance (15 paces). A preliminary meeting in 1855 between seven other clubs, five from New York and one each from Brooklyn and New Jersey, (Note: The clubs were the Gotham, Baltic, Empire, Eckford and Harmony of New York, Atlantic of Brooklyn and Senior of Newark) represented the first effort to form an organized league, although it came to nothing. However, in 1857 sixteen clubs from New York and environs sent delegates to a convention that standardized the rules, essentially by agreeing to the unified Knickerbocker-Gotham-Eagle rules with certain revisions: rather than playing to a set number of runs, games would consist of nine innings, and force-outs could now occur at any base. The convention also defined the distance between the bases unambiguously as 90 feet, and specified nine-man teams. (Note: The Knickerbocker delegates argued strenuously for seven innings and seven men, but were out-voted) The following year, twenty-five clubs including one from New Jersey established an ongoing governing body with officers, constitution and by-laws, but the National Association of Base Ball Players is conventionally dated from the first meeting in 1857. It governed through 1870 but it scheduled and sanctioned no games.

In 1858, clubs from the association played a cross-town, all-star series pitting Brooklyn clubs against clubs from New York and Hoboken. On July 20, 1858, an estimated crowd of about 4,000 spectators watched New York and Hoboken defeat Brooklyn by a score of 22–18. The New York team included players from the Union, Empire, Eagle, Knickerbocker and Gotham clubs. The Brooklyn team included players from the clubs Excelsior, Eckford, Atlantic and Putnam. This was the first baseball game played before a paying crowd, with tickets priced at ten cents; (Note: Plus an additional twenty or thirty cents for parking one-horse or two-horse vehicles, respectively. Expensive parking is an old baseball tradition.) the surplus receipts after costs were donated to charity. In a return match held August 17, 1858, and played at the Fashion Course in the Corona neighborhood of Queens, a slightly smaller crowd cheered Brooklyn to a win over New York and Hoboken by a score of 29–8. New York won a third game in the series, also played at the Fashion Course, on September 10, 1858.

By 1862 some NABBP member clubs offered games to the general public in enclosed ballparks with admission fees.

During and after the American Civil War (1861–1865), the movements of soldiers and exchanges of prisoners helped spread the game. As of the December 1865 meeting, the year the war ended, there were isolated Association clubs in Fort Leavenworth, St. Louis, Louisville, and Chattanooga, Tennessee, along with about 90 member clubs north and east of Washington, D.C. The game that was spread, however, was overwhelmingly the Knickerbocker version to the detriment of the older forms; as one periodical stated in 1865,

The National Association or "New-York game" is now almost universally adopted by the Clubs all over the country; and the Massachusetts, and still more ancient style of playing familiar to any school-boy, called "town ball", will soon become obsolete. No lover of the pastime can regret this, as the New-York mode is superior and more attractive in every way; and better calculated to perpetuate and render "our national game" an "institution" with both "young and old America. – Wilkes' Spirit of the Times, March 18, 1865

All of these clubs were nominally amateur, although by the late 1860s the strongest clubs' best players were being paid under the table. For the 1869 season the NABBP, in an effort to take the corrupting money out of the amateur game, permitted the formation of professional teams. This move, however, backfired, as the pro game exploded in popularity and amateur club baseball quickly died out. By far the most successful of the new professional clubs, the Cincinnati Red Stockings, recruited nationally and effectively toured nationally, and no one beat them until June 1870. Their success led to the founding of the National Association of Professional Base Ball Players in 1871 and its successor, the National League of Professional Base Ball Clubs in 1876, the elder of baseball's two Major Leagues and the oldest professional sports league in the world. (Note: England's Football Association was organized in 1863, but was amateur until 1885.)

Already in the 19th century, the "old game" was invoked for special exhibitions such as reunions and anniversaries – and for making moral points. Today hundreds of clubs in the U.S. play "vintage base ball" according to the 1845, 1858, or later rules (up to about 1887), usually in vintage uniforms. Some of them have supporting casts that recreate period dress and manner, especially those associated with living history museums.

The origins of baseball were summarized in a documentary produced by Major League Baseball in 2009 titled Base Ball Discovered.

== See also ==
- Palant
- History of baseball
  - Variations of baseball#History
