= Doc Adams =

American baseball player and executive (1814–1899)

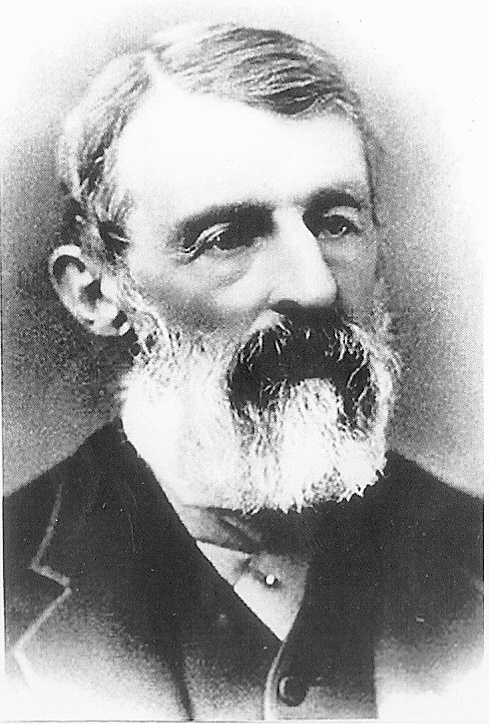
- Adams circa 1870
- Born: Daniel Lucius Adams; November 1, 1814; Mont Vernon, New Hampshire, U.S.
- Died: January 3, 1899 (aged 84); New Haven, Connecticut, U.S.
- Education: Yale University; Harvard Medical School
- Occupations: Player and executive for New York Knickerbockers; Leader of National Association of Base Ball Players rules and regulations committee
- Known for: Helped institute rules changes in baseball Credited as creator of shortstop position

Daniel Lucius "Doc" Adams (November 1, 1814 – January 3, 1899) was an American baseball player and executive who is regarded by historians as an important figure in the sport's early years. For most of his career he was a member of the New York Knickerbockers. He first played for the New York Base Ball Club in 1840 and started his Knickerbockers career five years later, continuing to play for the club into his forties and to take part in inter-squad practice games and matches against opposing teams. Researchers have called Adams the creator of the shortstop position, which he used to field short throws from outfielders. In addition to his playing career, Adams manufactured baseballs and oversaw bat production; he also occasionally acted as an umpire.

From 1847 to 1861, the Knickerbockers selected Adams as their president six times, and as a vice president, treasurer, or director in six other years. As president of the club, Adams was an advocate of rule changes in baseball that resulted in nine-man teams and nine-inning games. When the National Association of Base Ball Players (NABBP) was formed in 1858, he led the rules and regulations committee of the new organization. In his role, Adams ruled that the fields' bases should be 90 feet (27 m) apart, the modern distance, and supported the elimination of the "bound rule", which allowed for balls caught after one bounce to be recorded as outs. He resigned from his positions with the Knickerbockers and NABBP in 1862. Adams' contributions in creating baseball's rules went largely unrecognized for decades after his 1899 death, but in 1980 a letter about him appeared in The New York Times; by 1993, researcher John Thorn had written about Adams' role. Other historians have given him credit for helping to develop the sport, and Thorn has called Adams "first among the Fathers of Baseball".

A graduate of Yale University and Harvard Medical School, Adams began working in the medical field in the late 1830s, and practiced in New York City during his time as a member of the Knickerbockers. In 1865, he left medicine and later became a bank president and member of the Connecticut legislature. He and his wife had five children.

== Early life ==
Born in Mont Vernon, New Hampshire, on November 1, 1814, Adams was the fourth of Daniel and Nancy Adams' five children. The elder Daniel Adams was a physician and author; he wrote a math textbook that was widely used in the United States in the early- to mid-1800s. After being schooled at Kimball Union Academy in New Hampshire from 1826 to 1828 and Amherst, Massachusetts' Mount Pleasant Classical Institution, Adams attended three colleges from 1831 to 1838. He studied at Amherst College for two years, then transferred to Yale University, where he acquired a bachelor's degree upon his graduation in 1835. Nancy Adams, Daniel's sister, indicated in a letter penned in the early 1830s that he began playing with "bats and balls" by this time.

Adams continued his studies at Harvard Medical School through 1838, obtaining an MD. Following his time in college, he joined his father's medical practice. The pair worked in Mont Vernon, before the younger Adams relocated twice, first to Boston and then to New York City. Adams also worked for the New York Dispensaries, which provided medical care to poor residents. He offered his assistance when outbreaks of cholera affected New York City. For providing vaccinations, Adams received yearly pay of $400 for a time. His field of employment gave rise to his nickname of "Doc", which was given as "Dock" at the time.

== Playing career ==
According to baseball historian John Thorn, 1839 is the year Adams became a baseball player. In an 1896 interview in The Sporting News, Adams said that "soon after going to New York I began to play base ball just for exercise, with a number of other young medical men." Starting in 1840, he was a player with the New York Base Ball Club. This team had been founded in 1837, eight years earlier than the New York Knickerbockers, who are credited in several baseball histories as pioneering the modern version of baseball. Adams played an early form of the game, but Thorn writes that he "understood [it] to be baseball, no matter what it was called".

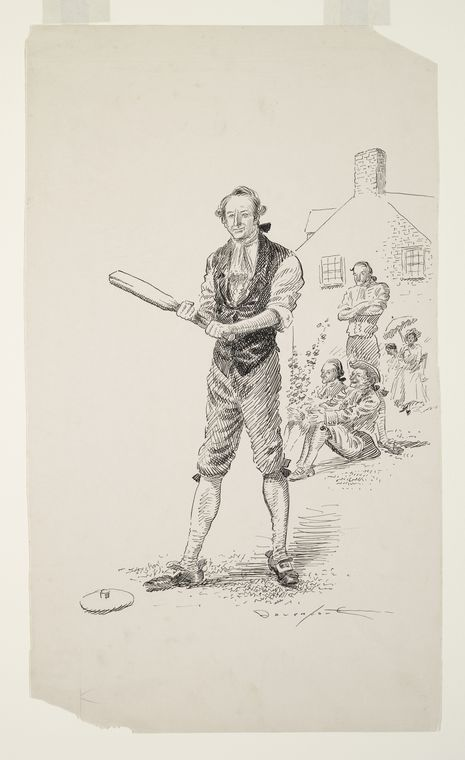
The Knickerbockers during a practice session, as depicted by Homer Davenport. Adams took leadership in pushing other club members to attend practice.

Adams received an invitation to become a member of the Knickerbockers a month or so after the team's September 23, 1845, creation. He accepted and joined the club along with other men in the medical field; he later said that players from the New York Base Ball Club were behind the formation of the Knickerbockers. Records of the club's practice games indicate that he was a member of the Knickerbockers by November 18, 1845. In an inter-squad game held that day, which was the Knickerbockers' last of the year, Adams scored nine runs for his team as they defeated a side picked by William R. Wheaton, 51–42. The club organized its first game against outside opposition in 1846; at a June 5 meeting Adams was selected to a three-man committee whose aim was to set up a game against the New York Base Ball Club. The committee's efforts were successful, and a game was scheduled on June 19. Adams participated in the contest, which the Knickerbockers lost 23–1. Batting second in the Knickerbockers' lineup, he made one out and did not score a run.

The Knickerbockers did not play any known games against other clubs from 1847 to 1850. During these years, the team split its players into two squads, which played against each other twice per week. According to Adams, he often attempted to compel members of the Knickerbockers to attend the sessions. He was only occasionally successful, and when few Knickerbockers came, they played variants of baseball that required fewer players than regular games. Twice in June 1851, the club played against the Washington Base Ball Club, winning by scores of 21–11 and 22–20. No individual statistics are available for the first game; Adams scored twice for the Knickerbockers in the second. In 1853, Adams played in two games against the Gotham Ball Club, tallying seven runs in a pair of victories. The two clubs met three times from June to October 1854, and Adams had one run in each game. After splitting the first two contests, their October 26, 1854, game lasted 12 innings before being suspended due to darkness with the score tied 12–12; both teams fell short of the 21 runs that were required to win a game under the rules of the time.

Following two November games against the Eagle Base Ball Club that Adams is not known to have participated in, he returned to the Knickerbockers' lineup for a June 1, 1855, game against Gotham and scored three times, although Gotham prevailed, 21–12. He took part in two other 1855 games against Eagle and Gotham, respectively, scoring five runs total as the Knickerbockers won both contests. Adams competed four times for the club against outside opponents in 1856 as it won once, lost twice, and had one tie; he scored ten times, and records for two games showed that his defensive position was shortstop. The Knickerbockers had a 2–2 win–loss record in competitive games during 1857 that Adams participated in. Playing three times at shortstop and once at first base defensively, he contributed 12 runs offensively, including a six-run effort in the Knickerbockers' 37–23 victory over the Empire club on June 24. In 1858, Adams made four appearances for the Knickerbockers against outside opposition and scored nine runs, but the team went 1–3 in the games. He varied his defensive positioning between second base, third base, and shortstop.

== Playing style ==
Adams has been credited as the creator of the shortstop position (highlighted).

As a player, Adams created the concept of the shortstop position, according to Thorn and Baseball Hall of Fame researcher Freddy Berowski. In the first five years the Knickerbockers played, the team fielded anywhere from eight to eleven players. The only infielders were the players covering each of the bases; if there were more than eight players, extra outfielders were sometimes used. The outfielders had difficulty throwing baseballs into the infield, because of the balls' light weight. Adams' shortstop position, at which he started playing in about 1849 or 1850, was used to field throws from the outfielders and throw to the three infielders. With the advent of higher-quality baseballs, Adams moved toward the infield, since the distance the balls could travel increased. Prior to the invention of the shortstop, large gaps existed in the defensive positioning of infields; defensive players tended to stand by bases, leaving empty space in between them for batters. The shortstop filled one of the two gaps.

Adams hit left-handed; he said that his batted balls occasionally went into a river by the Elysian Fields, the ground in Hoboken, New Jersey, where the Knickerbockers practiced and played. Adams had a long on-field career with the Knickerbockers; he remained a player with the team until 1859. He did not limit his play to shortstop; he fielded at every position except pitcher. Little is known about the relative performance of early baseball players, and the game was largely recreational, as opposed to competitive. Thorn speculates that Adams may have been "the best player of the 1840s", citing his lengthy playing career as evidence.

== Equipment maker and umpire ==
In addition to playing the game, Adams was involved in the production of early baseball equipment. He personally manufactured baseballs for a period of time, supplying many New York City-based clubs. Adams found that when the ball was more tightly stitched, it traveled further when batted or thrown. According to author Peter Morris, Adams' ball-manufacturing efforts helped to keep the Knickerbockers in operation during their first few years, as they would otherwise have had difficulty finding balls. In later years Adams gathered rubber from old galoshes for the insides of baseballs. A tanner then used horsehide to create the balls. As late as 1863, Adams was one of the three most prominent makers of baseballs in New York, continuing to produce them by hand. Adams also played a role in producing baseball bats, choosing which wood to use and overseeing the manufacturing process.

Adams also worked occasionally as an umpire in significant games. One notable example was the final contest of a three-game series between all-star teams from Brooklyn and New York City, held on September 10, 1858, in Long Island. During the game, which the New York City all-stars won 29–18, Adams became the first umpire to use a new rule allowing for a strike to be called against a batter who refused to swing when "good pitches" were thrown to them. Previously, strikes were only called when a batter swung at a pitch and missed. Three batters were ruled out on strikes called by Adams in the game. Otherwise, the called strike rule was not applied often in its first few years of existence.

== Knickerbockers and NABBP executive ==
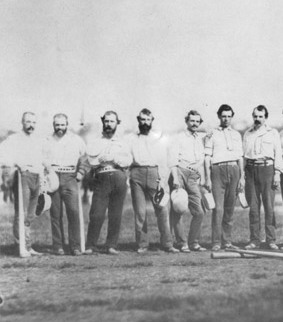
Adams standing in the middle of a group of New York Knickerbockers in 1859

The Knickerbockers held elections annually to determine who would serve as officials. At the club's second election, held on May 5, 1846, Adams was named the Knickerbockers' vice president. At an April 1847 meeting, he became the president of the team, and was re-elected in 1848 and 1849. He was the leader of a "Committee to Revive the Constitution and By-Laws" of baseball in 1848. Adams was not chosen as an officer in 1851, but the next year was named one of the club's three treasurers; he was elected to the same position the following two years. The number of baseball teams in the New York City area started to grow during the early 1850s, as the Washington Base Ball Club (also known as the Gotham Ball Club) and Eagle Base Ball Club were founded or reorganized. The Eagle Base Ball Club, desiring a unified set of rules, sent a message to the Knickerbockers requesting that a committee be formed. Adams was one of the three Knickerbockers members selected to be on the committee, and the clubs agreed on a set of rules, which were presented at the Knickerbockers' meeting on April 1, 1854. At the same meeting, Adams was voted into the position of club director.

After again being named a director in 1855, Adams became president of the Knickerbockers for the fourth time, winning an election held at the club's April 5, 1856, meeting. He remained the team's president in 1857, and after not being named as an officer the next three years, was elected president in 1861. During his time as the club's president, the Knickerbockers' organization was emulated by newly formed teams, and Adams himself was considered a "respected" figure by members of other clubs. According to author Andrew J. Schiff, Adams was among the most powerful baseball figures of the era. Concurrently, Adams maintained his New York City medical practice.

=== Number of players and game length ===
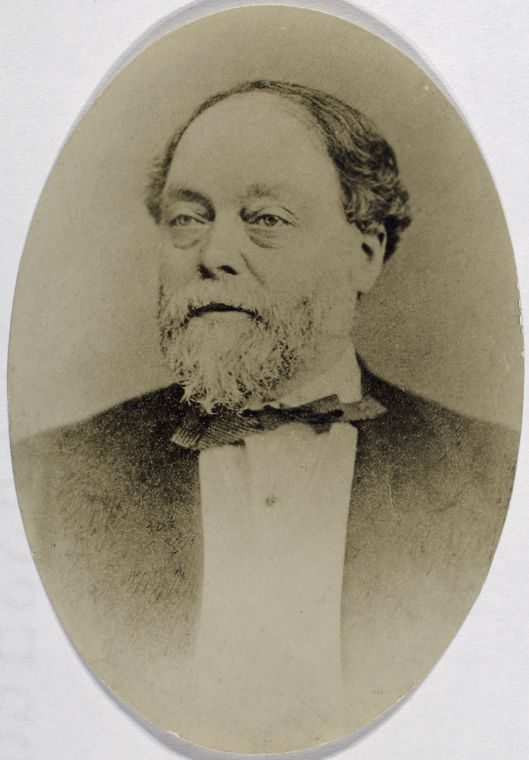
Duncan Curry and Adams were on opposite sides of the Knickerbockers' debates on roster size and game length.

A supporter of nine-man baseball teams, Adams favored a measure in 1856 which allowed for players from outside the Knickerbockers to join their intrasquad games when 17 or fewer team members appeared. No rules existed at the time regarding team size, but official games between clubs were typically played with nine men per club. The proposal was defeated by a 13–11 vote, in favor of a rule forbidding non-club members to play if there were 14 players (seven per team).

A two-man committee was created with the aim of working with the Eagle and Washington clubs to resolve the debate over how many players to field in official games. Duncan F. Curry and William F. Ladd were chosen as the committee members, but Ladd withdrew and Adams was named as a substitute. His partner on the committee, Curry, had led the opposition to nine-man teams. Adams and Curry also differed on another issue: the length of games. At the time, a baseball game lasted until one of the teams had 21 runs; that team was awarded the victory. A change in how games were won was deemed necessary after the suspended game in 1854. Adams favored nine-inning games, while Curry wanted contests to last seven innings. A convention was scheduled for early 1857, and Adams joined a three-man committee tasked with encouraging local clubs to send delegates. At the convention, which consisted of one session each in January and February, Adams was voted president. The Knickerbockers had voted among themselves to back seven-inning games, but the other teams backed a motion for nine-inning contests, which passed.

These changes were incorporated in the "Laws of Base Ball", written by Adams. He authored the initial draft of the regulations with what The New York Times' Richard Sandomir called "an upright script and strong hand." The "Laws" included regulations governing bat and ball sizes, and a ban on betting by players and umpires. Fellow Knickerbocker William H. Grenelle copied Adams' work onto blue pages, and modifications and notations were made as the convention progressed. Among other changes, part of the rule Adams had written on game length was crossed out; the number nine was replaced with seven, before the motion that settled the issue was introduced. In March, the Knickerbockers changed their rules to match those passed at the convention. In May 1857, Adams presided over a player convention where nine-inning games were officially made part of the rules of baseball for participating teams.

=== Distance between bases and campaign against bound rule ===
In March 1858, the National Association of Base Ball Players (NABBP) was formed at another convention. Adams was one of the Knickerbockers' two delegates, having been selected at a February meeting attended by representatives from 25 clubs. He held the chairmanship of the association's rules and regulations committee, and drafted the new organization's initial set of rules. These included a clarification of the prescribed distance between bases, which under Knickerbocker Rules had been set at "forty-two paces" between home plate and second base, and "forty-two paces, equidistant" between first and third base. Historians differ on whether the bases were roughly 90 feet (27 m) apart, or a shorter distance. Thorn has written that the pace itself may have been "an imprecise and variable measure, to gauge distances by 'stepping off'," and Adams described the rule as "rather vague." At the 1857 convention, it was decided that bases would be "securely fastened upon the four corners of a square whose sides are roughly thirty yards." As rules committee chairman for the new NABBP, Adams made the baselines 90 feet (27 m) from one base to another, the distance seen in modern baseball. He ruled on the distance between home plate and the pitcher's position as well, making them 45 feet (14 m) apart. In addition, the committee mandated that clubs have nine players per side, which became the norm. It also created the called strike rule, in an effort to reduce pitch totals and the time required to play games.

Adams campaigned for a further change in the rules of baseball, involving when outs were recorded. At the time, an out was allowed when the ball was caught by a fielder after one bounce; this was known as the "bound rule". Adams supported a ban on such outs, calling his preferred rule "the fly-game". Under the style of play he backed, when a fly ball was hit a fielder would have to catch the ball before it touched the ground for an out to be made. This was similar to rules on catches in cricket, and would serve to increase the level of skill required from fielders. The Knickerbockers had enacted a rule mandating the "fly-catch" by 1857.

The Knickerbockers attempted to introduce the fly rule more widely at the 1857 convention, with a proposal that permitted the continued use of the bound rule for foul balls. Despite widespread support from sportswriters, the proposed rule change was voted down. Writer William Hershberger said that the decision showed "the limits of the Knickerbockers' influence and divisions within the baseball fraternity." The rule change was proposed to the NABBP annually by Adams but did not pass. At the 1858 NABBP convention, a vote on eliminating the bound rule was unsuccessful. Opponents raised concerns that the proposal would dramatically lengthen game times. Despite his support for the fly rule, in 1858 Adams successfully motioned for NABBP regulations, including outs on bounces, to apply to the Knickerbockers. He did so because he was reluctant to oppose the rules of the NABBP. Shortly after his motion, he organized a Knickerbockers meeting to discuss the fly rule and "obtain a reconsideration" of the newly passed resolution. At the meeting, the Knickerbockers decided to exclude outs on bounces from their practice games and contests against teams that supported the fly rule. In future years, the club remained an advocate of eliminating the bound rule, but Adams' continued efforts were rejected. A split in the rules and regulations committee caused it to avoid supporting the fly game at the NABBP's 1859 convention, and votes at the 1860 and 1861 conventions maintained the bound rule. Adams' final comments about the regulation at an NABBP convention indicated that he believed it would soon be modified. The bound rule started losing support by 1863, after Adams left the Knickerbockers, and outs on bounced balls were outlawed in 1864.

=== Retirement ===
In addition to his other roles, Adams regularly served as a delegate on behalf of the Knickerbockers at the NABBP's annual meetings. He remained with the Knickerbockers in an executive role until March 26, 1862, when he retired having served 12 years overall in various non-playing capacities. Upon leaving his position, the club named him an honorary member. He received a scroll from the Knickerbockers, which referred to him as "The Nestor of Ball Players", alluding to a mythical king known for offering advice and for his long life. Adams also resigned from his role as rules committee chairman of the NABBP.

== Later life ==
Adams and Cornelia Cook married in 1861, and remained together until Adams' death. The couple had five children; the first, a son named Charles, died less than a month after his birth in 1864. The others, two sons (Frank and Roger) and two daughters (Catharine and Mary), were born between 1866 and 1874. Adams continued to maintain his medical practice during his baseball career, but was forced to abandon it in 1865 after he began suffering health issues. After relocating to Ridgefield, Connecticut, he went on to become "one of the leading citizens of the Connecticut village," according to author William J. Ryczek. Adams served as a Republican legislator in the Connecticut House of Representatives for the town in 1870. He contributed to the creation of the Ridgefield Land Improvement Association, and to a committee overseeing construction of a town house. In 1871, he accepted a job with the Ridgefield Savings Bank (later renamed the Fairfield County Bank) as the company's first president. After working there until 1879, Adams took a break from his duties; during this time, he helped found Ridgefield's library and served as its treasurer. In 1884, he returned to the Ridgefield National Bank and remained president there until mid-1886. Adams and his family relocated to a house in New Haven, Connecticut, in 1888.

Along with baseball, playing music was among Adams' favorite activities. Occasionally, he and Henry Ward Beecher performed flute duets. Although no longer actively involved in baseball, Adams was still a follower of the sport. He played in an exhibition as late as 1875, and stories exist that he played recreationally into the following decade. Late in his life, he said of the growth of baseball, "We pioneers never expected to see the game so universal as it has now become." Adams contracted pneumonia following a bout of influenza, and died on January 3, 1899, at the age of 84. He was buried at New Haven's Evergreen Cemetery.

== Legacy ==
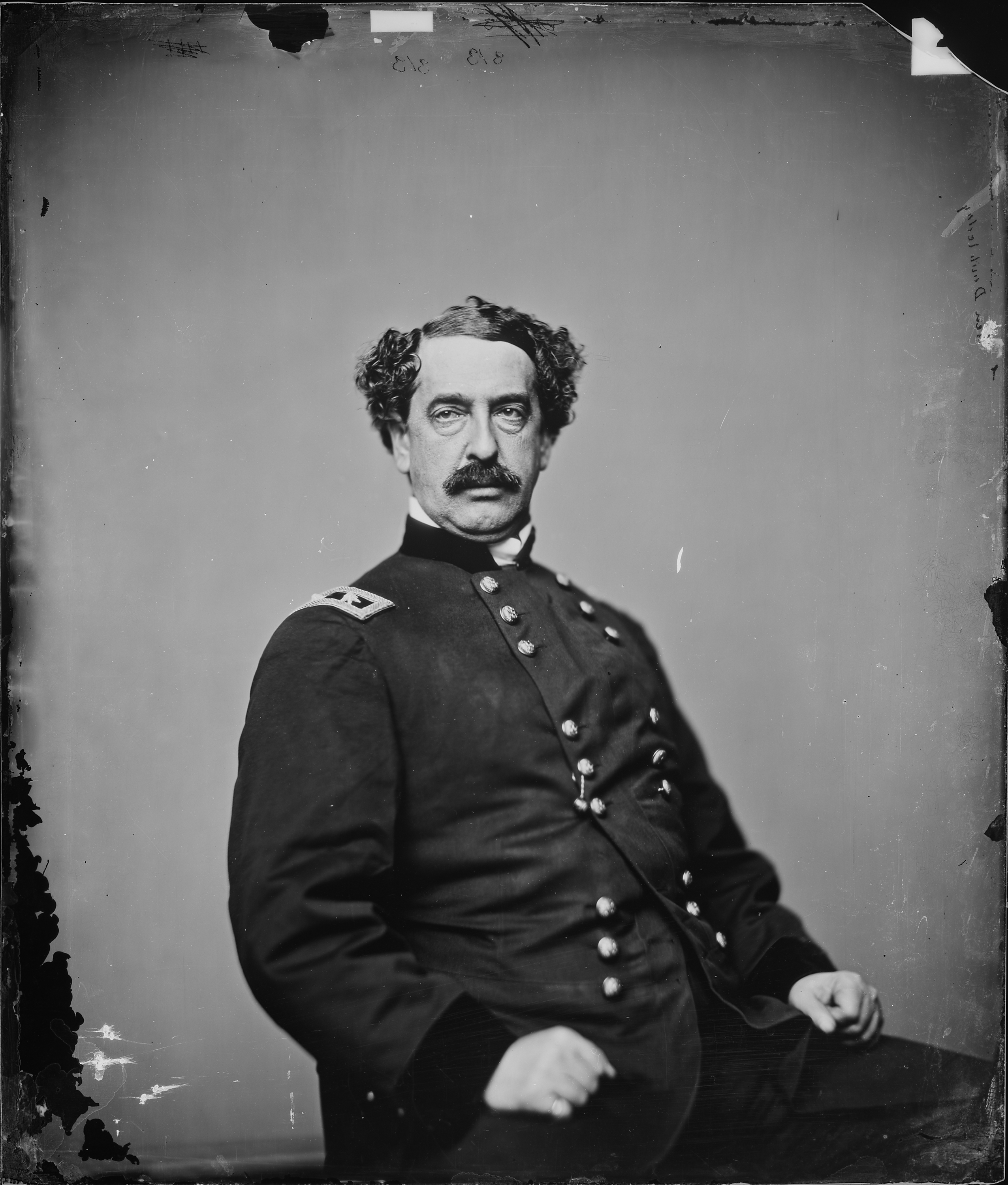
Media reports that Abner Doubleday invented baseball led to a story on Adams appearing in The New York Times in 1980.

For decades after Adams' death, his role in codifying baseball's early rules was largely unremembered. Thorn included Adams among a group of "powerfully influential figures" from the period—also including Louis F. Wadsworth and Wheaton—who he writes "went unrecognized in their lifetimes and became mysteries to future generations." Alexander Cartwright was more widely recognized as a pioneering figure for the sport. The Baseball Hall of Fame has claimed that Cartwright was the inventor of 90-foot (27 m) baselines and the nine-inning game. However, by the time conventions led by Adams had enacted those rules in the late 1850s, Cartwright had traveled to California and was no longer a member of the Knickerbockers. Adams is said to have avoided "campaigning for credit" for rules changes after he left the Knickerbockers; researcher Gary O'Maxfield said of him that he "didn't like to brag." Several of the rules approved at the conventions survived to modern baseball, including the 90-foot (27 m) baseline distance. The 45-foot (14 m) distance from home plate to the pitching mound, however, did not last through the 19th century; it was pushed back 5 feet (1.5 m) in 1880. The shortstop position, which for Adams was located between the infielders and outfielders, was later played in the infield, between second and third base. Dickey Pearce was the first player to field in that area, and his ability to prevent base hits in the formerly unoccupied territory convinced other teams to employ similar tactics.

The Hartford Courant points to 1980 as a year when Adams started to gain greater attention for his achievements. A share of the New York Mets was purchased by a publishing company led by Nelson Doubleday Jr. that year, and claims that Abner Doubleday invented baseball in 1839, which are considered flawed by modern researchers, were reported by the media. After the Doubleday reports in 1980, The New York Times received a letter from the great-great-grandson of Adams that the Courant said attempted "to try to set the record straight." The newspaper ran the letter in its April 13 issue, and added a 1939 piece by Roger Adams. In 1993, Thorn published research on Adams' contributions in the encyclopedia Total Baseball. The New York Times published an article on Adams on September 23, 2015. Mont Vernon holds an annual baseball game in honor of Adams, which incorporates the rules of his era, as a part of the town's Lamson Farm Day.

Various historians have given Adams recognition as an important figure from the early years of baseball. Thorn has written that he "may be counted as first among the Fathers of Baseball." O'Maxfield said of Adams: "Without [him], we wouldn't have the game we know and love as baseball today." The "father" label was rejected by Ryczek; he wrote that Adams did not conceive the sport, but called him a "collaborator" in its development. On July 31, 2014, the Society for American Baseball Research announced that it had chosen Adams as its 2014 "Overlooked 19th Century Baseball Legend". Eric Miklich has called him worthy of induction into the Baseball Hall of Fame for his role as a pioneer. He says of Adams, "Should he be in the Hall of Fame? Absolutely. You ask anyone who knows about 19th century baseball. They'll laugh at Cartwright; Abner Doubleday, they won't even talk about; but they all know Doc Adams. He was the glue that held things together in the early part of baseball." Adams did not appear on a Baseball Hall of Fame ballot until 2016, when he was up for consideration on the Hall's Pre-Integration Era Committee ballot. Ten of the 16 committee members supported him, two fewer than the number needed for induction.

While Adams' contributions had received notice from historians, Associated Press writer Andrew Dalton called such reports "somewhat speculative" in nature before 2016. That year, the 1857 "Laws of Base Ball" authored by Adams were sold at an auction. The documents were included in a batch of historical papers that brought $12,000 in a 1999 sale. Adams' authorship of the papers was unknown at the time, but was confirmed after the owner brought the documents to the attention of an auction house in 2015. An anonymous buyer purchased the "Laws of Base Ball" in April 2016 for $3.26 million, the most a series of baseball documents had ever sold for.

== Bibliography ==
- Cash, Jon David (2002). Before They Were Cardinals: Major League Baseball in Nineteenth-Century St. Louis. Columbia, Missouri: University of Missouri Press. ISBN 978-0-8262-1401-0.
- Freyer, John; Rucker, Mark (2005). Peverelly's National Game. Charleston, South Carolina: Arcadia Publishing. ISBN 978-0-7385-3404-6.
- Geroud, Samuel Lankton, ed. (1880). The General Catalogue and a Brief History of Kimball Union Academy. Claremont, New Hampshire: Claremont Manufacturing Co. OCLC 262469815.
- Hample, Zack (2011). The Baseball: Stunts, Scandals, and Secrets Beneath the Stitches. New York City: Anchor Books. ISBN 978-0-307-47545-9.
- Hershberger, Richard (Spring 2013). "The Base Ball Convention of 1857". Base Ball: A Journal of the Early Game. 7 (1): 28–44. doi:10.3172/BB.7.28. ISSN 1934-2802.
- Husman, John R. (2000). "Adams, Daniel Lucius". In Porter, David L (ed.). Biographical Dictionary of American Sports: Baseball (A–F). Westport, Connecticut: Greenwood Press. ISBN 978-0-313-31174-1.
- Morris, Peter; Ryczek, William J.; Finkel, Jan; Levin, Leonard; Malatzky, Richard, eds. (2013). Base Ball Founders: The Clubs, Players and Cities of the Northeast That Established the Game. Jefferson, North Carolina: McFarland & Company. ISBN 978-0-7864-7430-1.
- Morris, Peter (2008). But Didn't We Have Fun?: An Informal History of Baseball's Pioneer Era, 1843–1870. Chicago: Ivan R. Dee. ISBN 978-1-56663-849-4.
- Ryczek, William J. (2009). Baseball's First Inning: A History of the National Pastime Through the Civil War. Jefferson, North Carolina: McFarland & Company. ISBN 978-0-7864-4194-5.
- Schaefer, Robert H. (Fall 2009). "The Legend of the Lively Ball". Base Ball: A Journal of the Early Game. 3 (2): 88–98. doi:10.3172/BB.3.2.88. ISSN 1934-2802.
- Schiff, Andrew J. (2008). "The Father of Baseball": A Biography of Henry Chadwick. Jefferson, North Carolina: McFarland & Company. ISBN 978-0-7864-3216-5.
- Smith, Charles James (1907). History of the Town of Mont Vernon, New Hampshire. Boston: Blanchard Printing Co. OCLC 1046505441.
- Spink, Alfred Henry (2000) [1911]. The National Game: Second Edition. Carbondale, Illinois: Southern Illinois University Press. ISBN 978-0-8093-2304-3.
- Thorn, John (2011). Baseball in the Garden of Eden: The Secret History of the Early Game. New York City: Simon & Schuster. ISBN 978-0-7432-9403-4.
- Thorn, John (2015). "The Making of Baseball's Magna Carta". Base Ball: A Journal of the Early Game. 9 (1): 90–100. ISSN 1934-2802.
- Thorn, John (1993). "The True Father of Baseball". In Thorn, John; Palmer, Pete (eds.). Total Baseball: The Ultimate Encyclopedia of Baseball (3 ed.). New York City: Harper Perennial. ISBN 978-0-06-273189-0.
- Ward, Geoffrey C.; Burns, Ken (1994). Baseball: An Illustrated History. New York City: Alfred A. Knopf. ISBN 978-0-679-40459-0.
