= Knickerbocker Rules =

Early formalization of the rules of American baseball

The Knickerbocker Rules are a set of baseball rules formalized by William R. Wheaton and William H. Tucker of the Knickerbocker Base Ball Club in 1845. They have previously been considered to be the basis for the rules of the modern game, although this is disputed. The rules are informally known as the "New York style" of baseball, as opposed to other variants such as the "Massachusetts Game" and "Philadelphia town ball".

== Dispute ==
Modern scholarship has cast doubt on the originality of these rules, as information has come to light about the New York clubs that predated the Knickerbockers, in particular, the rules devised by William R. Wheaton for the Gotham Club in 1837. Baseball historian Jeffrey Kittel has concluded that none of the Knickerbocker Rules of 1845 was original, with the possible exception of three-out innings. Nonetheless, the Knickerbocker Rules are significant for baseball historians because they are the earliest extant rules from which the evolution of modern baseball can be lineally traced, and whether or not they can claim to be "first", they describe the kind of game played by the New York-area amateur clubs from which the modern game developed.

== Rules ==
Several of the rules survive in some form in the modern game, while others differ substantially from current rules. The list as presented, except for the commentary, is taken directly from the "Rules" as published in the 1860 Beadle's Dime Base Ball Player, edited by Henry Chadwick (website below):

4th. The bases shall be from "home" to second base, forty-two paces; from first to third base, forty-two paces, equidistant.

- If a pace is taken to be 3 feet, that works out to 126 feet (38 m) diagonally across the square that makes up the infield, or 89.1 feet between consecutive bases (the corners of the square). The rules currently specify the same method for marking off the bases, only at 127 feet 3-3/8 inches, which works out to 90 feet (27 m) between bases. Contemporary sources, such as Noah Webster's dictionary, define a "pace" as 2-1/2 feet, which would make the bases approximately 75 feet apart. The first rule which definitively established the basepaths at 30 yards (90 feet) was enacted by the Convention of 1857.

8th. The game to consist of twenty-one counts, or aces; but at the conclusion an equal number of hands must be played.

- The terminology reflects card-playing conventions. The winner was the first team to score 21 "aces" (now called "runs", a cricket term), after an equal number of turns at bat or "hands". This rule, in combination with Rule 15, determined the length of the game. The game is now defined to be a certain number of "innings", another cricket term. Under this rule, a game could in theory be completed after a single inning if one team scored the requisite 21 runs. The standard game length of nine innings was introduced in 1857.

9th. The ball must be pitched, not thrown, for the bat.

- The ball was required to be delivered underhand, in the manner of pitching a horseshoe. Overhand pitching was not permitted until 1884, although the transition from underhand to overhand was gradual; pitchers progressively increased speed and developed movement within the constraints of the underhand rule. The rules did not yet specify a precise location from which the pitcher was required to deliver the ball.

10th. A ball knocked out of the field, or outside the range of the first and third base, is foul.

- In most early forms of baseball, town ball, rounders, and cricket, there was no foul territory and every batted ball was considered fair regardless of direction. Under this rule, a ball struck between the baselines and beyond the field boundary was not a home run but a foul. This was seldom consequential in practice, as early ball fields typically lacked close fences and balls struck over a boundary were uncommon.
- Foul balls were not initially counted as strikes. When it became apparent that batters could foul off pitches indefinitely to avoid swinging at unfavorable deliveries, rules were introduced to address the imbalance: foul balls were declared strikes unless the batter already had two strikes (NL 1901, AL 1903). A separate amendment in 1894 declared any foul bunt a strike, to prevent batters from bunting repeatedly in search of a preferred pitch.

11th. Three balls being struck at and missed and the last one caught, is a hand-out; if not caught it is considered fair, and the striker bound to run.

- The three-strike rule is among the oldest provisions that persist in the modern game. The stipulation that a batter may attempt to reach first base on a missed third strike also survives, with the modern qualification that if first base is occupied with fewer than two outs, the batter is automatically retired—a provision designed to prevent the catcher from intentionally dropping the ball to create a force play, the same principle underlying the infield fly rule.
- The rule makes no reference to the strike zone, called strikes, or balls. These concepts developed later in response to tactics that prolonged games:
  - Batters who declined to swing at pitches they found unfavorable could delay play indefinitely. The called strike—initially a penalty for persistent refusal to swing following a warning from the umpire—was introduced in 1858.
  - Pitchers who threw wide of the plate or who delivered pitches intended to intimidate rather than to be hit also created delays. The called ball was introduced in 1863 as a corresponding penalty for persistent failure to deliver hittable pitches, with the umpire empowered to award the batter first base after a warning and repeated offenses. The number of balls required for a base on balls varied over subsequent years before being fixed at four in 1889.
  - The strike zone was not formally defined until 1887; before that season, the judgment of whether a pitch was fair to hit was left to the umpire.
- Foul balls were not counted as strikes under this rule, as addressed in Rule 10.

12th. If a ball be struck, or tipped, and caught, either flying or on the first bound, it is a hand out.

- Catching a fair ball on the first bounce was recorded as an out until 1865. Catching a foul ball on the first bounce remained an out until 1883. In this period gloves were not used, making a catch on the bounce more practical than catching a ball in flight. The rule also provided some balance in a game where Rule 8 implied that teams would regularly score large numbers of runs. The catcher of this era also positioned himself well behind home plate, in the absence of protective equipment, which further influenced how balls in the dirt were handled.

13th. A player running the bases shall be out, if the ball is in the hands of an adversary on the base, or the runner is touched with it before he makes his base; it being understood, however, that in no instance is a ball to be thrown at him.

- The prohibition on putting out a runner by striking him with a thrown ball—a practice known as "soaking" or "plugging"—was among the more significant departures from earlier forms of the game. Under this rule, a runner could be retired by tagging the base he was attempting to reach whether or not he was "forced" to advance; an 1848 amendment restricted this to first base only. The modern force-out at bases other than first was introduced in 1854.

15th. Three hands out, all out.

- This rule established three outs per half-inning. Earlier forms of town ball and related games operated on either a "one-out, all-out" basis (any putout ended the team's turn at bat) or "all-out, all-out" as in cricket (every member of the batting side was retired before the other team batted). Under the Knickerbocker rule, the term "hand" corresponds to the modern "at-bat". This rule represents a fundamental structural difference from cricket, in which all batsmen take their turns at bat within a single innings before the fielding and batting sides exchange.

16th. Players must take their strike in regular turn.

- This rule established a fixed batting order, a provision that remains part of the modern game.

18th. No ace or base can be made on a foul strike.

- Batters and baserunners do not advance on a foul ball, as defined in Rule 10. This principle also remains in effect in the modern game.

20th. But one base allowed when a ball bounds out of the field when struck.

- Early outfields were generally treated as boundless, and the only means of scoring what would now be called a home run was for a batter to circle the bases entirely on a ball hit into fair territory between outfielders. When a fair batted ball entered the crowd—which occurred with some frequency given that spectators often stood near the foul lines—the one-base rule applied. This provision was superseded with respect to the far playing boundary no later than 1876, when a ball clearing the outfield fence in fair territory, whether on the fly or on a bounce, was ruled a home run. The award of two bases when a batted ball bounces over the outfield fence—commonly but imprecisely called a "ground rule double"—was introduced in 1929 in the American League and 1931 in the National League. The one-base award for a ball sent out of play by a defensive error remains in effect.

== See also ==
- New York Knickerbockers
- William Wheaton

== Notes ==
- The Encyclopedia of Baseball, published by MacMillan, 1969, and subsequent editions
- Official Baseball Rules, various years
- The Dickson Baseball Dictionary, edited by Paul Dickson
- Baseball guides and annuals
