= William H. Tucker (baseball) =

American baseball (c. 1819–1894)

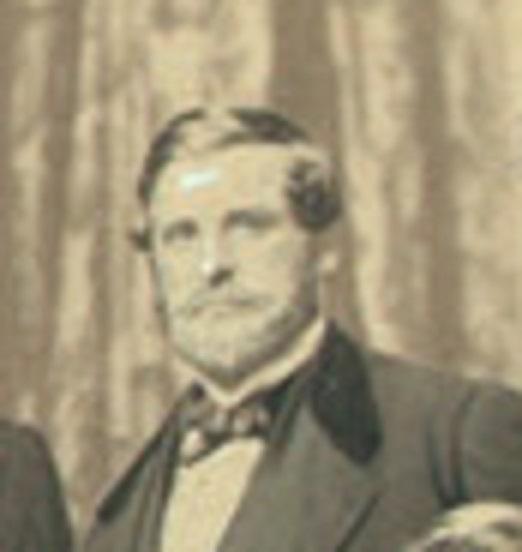
Tucker in 1862.

William H. Tucker (c. 1819 – December 5, 1894) was an American baseball pioneer, who was a player and organizer with the New York Knickerbockers in the 1840s.

On September 23, 1845, Tucker along with William Wheaton served on a committee which formalized the Knickerbocker's rules. He served as both club secretary and treasurer. Historian John Thorn stated that Tucker, Wheaton, Doc Adams and Louis F. Wadsworth are four figures who can claim serious credit for the development of the sport.

Tucker worked as a tobacconist and died in Brooklyn at the home of his son-in-law. His father, Abraham W. Tucker, was named an honorary member of the Knickerbockers in 1846.
