= Louis F. Wadsworth =

American baseball player (1825–1908)

Louis Fenn Wadsworth
- Born: May 6, 1825; Hartford, Connecticut, or Litchfield, Connecticut or Amenia, New York
- Died: March 26, 1908 (aged 82); Plainfield, New Jersey
- Burial place: Lot 7626, Section 50, Green-Wood Cemetery, Greenwood Heights, Brooklyn, New York; 40.65220, -73.99110
- Employer: Knickerbocker Base Ball Club of New York
- Known for: Codification of rules of baseball

Louis Fenn Wadsworth (May 6, 1825 – March 26, 1908) was an American baseball pioneer. He was a player and organizer with the New York Knickerbockers in the 1840s.

"Baseball's man of mystery," he is credited by John Thorn, Official Baseball Historian of Major League Baseball, with developing the number of innings and players on each team (nine each, instead of seven), as well as the field's diamond shape. Wadsworth was baseball's first professional player.

Born in either Hartford, Connecticut, Litchfield, Connecticut or Amenia, New York, to Amos Cowles Wadsworth, (born 1787) and Amanda Mann Wadsworth (born 1797). His father ran a business known as J.C. & A. Wadsworth, which manufactured and sold clocks.

Wadsworth graduated from Washington College (now Trinity College in Hartford, Conn.), and worked as a naval office attorney in the New York Custom House.

After college, he moved to Michigan but returned to the east coast to practice law in New York City in 1848 where he worked as a naval office attorney in the New York Custom House.

In 1851, Wadsworth was appointed as Deputy Clerk by the Clerk of the House in Albany. He also served as Clerk of the New York Legislature’s “select committee to investigate the funds of the late court of chancery,” for which he was paid $500.

In 1853, he was nominated for Schools Inspector for New York City’s 8th Ward on a Whig Unionist ticket whilst serving as the party secretary.

Despite being a figure in local and state politics, baseball was his great passion. In an 1887 interview in the New York Sun, a former Knicks teammate described him, “He was the life of the club. Part of his club suit consisted of a white shirt on the back of which was stamped a black devil...His hands were very large and when he went for a ball they looked like the tongs of an oyster rake. He got there all the same and but few balls passed him.”

John Thorn described him as a tempestuous character and noted that he could be considered baseball's first professional player

Wadsworth commenced his ball playing days with the Gothams, a venerable club that actually predated the Knickerbockers, with whom he quickly achieved prominence as the top first baseman of his time. Then, on April 1, 1854, he switched his allegiance to the Knickerbockers ... perhaps for 'emoluments,' as recompense was euphemistically known then; his skilled play would increase the Knickerbockers' chances of victory. It is these circumstances that incline me to believe that Wadsworth may thus be termed baseball's first professional player

— John Thorn, Louis Fenn Wadsworth: Baseball’s Man of Mystery and History

He married Maria Isabel Meschutt Fisher from Morris County in 1859, she was nine years older than Louis and was the widow of Jackson Fisher. She had two young children from her previous marriage at the time of her marriage to Louis.

A copy of his signature was sold for $39,000 in November 2025

== Formalisation of Baseball ==
In 1856, a committee was formed with representatives of each of the baseball teams to formalize the rules of the game. After it was agreed that games would be seven innings and seven players, Wadsworth (representative of the Knickerbockers) rejected the committee's conclusion of seven players and seven innings, and proposed nine. His proposal was approved by all clubs. Wadsworth's suggestion of nine innings was not in accordance with the original wishes of the Knicks and Wadsworth consequently parted ways with them and returned to the Gothams.

An 1877 statement by Duncan Curry to reporter Will Rankin, about the origin of the baseball diamond, revealed that “a diagram, showing the ball field laid out substantially as it is today, was brought to the field one day by a Mr. Wadsworth.” Curry said that Wadsworth's "plan caused a great deal of talk, but, finally, we agreed to try it.".

Rankin advised the Mills Commission about Curry's 1877 statement, attributing the invention of baseball's diamond shape to Wadsworth, in 1905. Wadsworth was mentioned in the 1908 Spalding guide, in regards to the Mills Commission's findings of the origins of baseball, although nobody on the Mills commission could locate him.

== After Baseball ==
Unbeknownst to the members of the Mills commission, in 1862, Louis retired from baseball and left New York and acquired Rockaway Farms, in Denville. In Denville, returned to education and served as Rockaway Township’s Superintendent of Schools.

In 1866, Wadsworth reported to the New Jersey State Board of Education that schools in Rockaway Township “are kept open while public money lasts, and, with few honorable exceptions, close when that is expended...Our teachers, for the most part, teach but three or six months.They do not intend to make it a vocation, and never acquire the experience requisite to success. Until a sufficient sum shall be annually raised to procure able and experienced teachers, the schools in this township will remain in their present condition, and all who desire that their children shall receive even a fair education, must send them away from home.”

Louis Fenn Wadsworth continued his practice as an attorney and also served as the local Justice of the Peace in Denville.

== Death ==
He died in a poorhouse 8 days after the Spalding Guide was released. He had purportedly taken to drink and squandered what was once a $300,000 fortune ($10.7 million in 2025 dollars).
