= Abraham G. Mills =

American baseball executive (1844–1929)

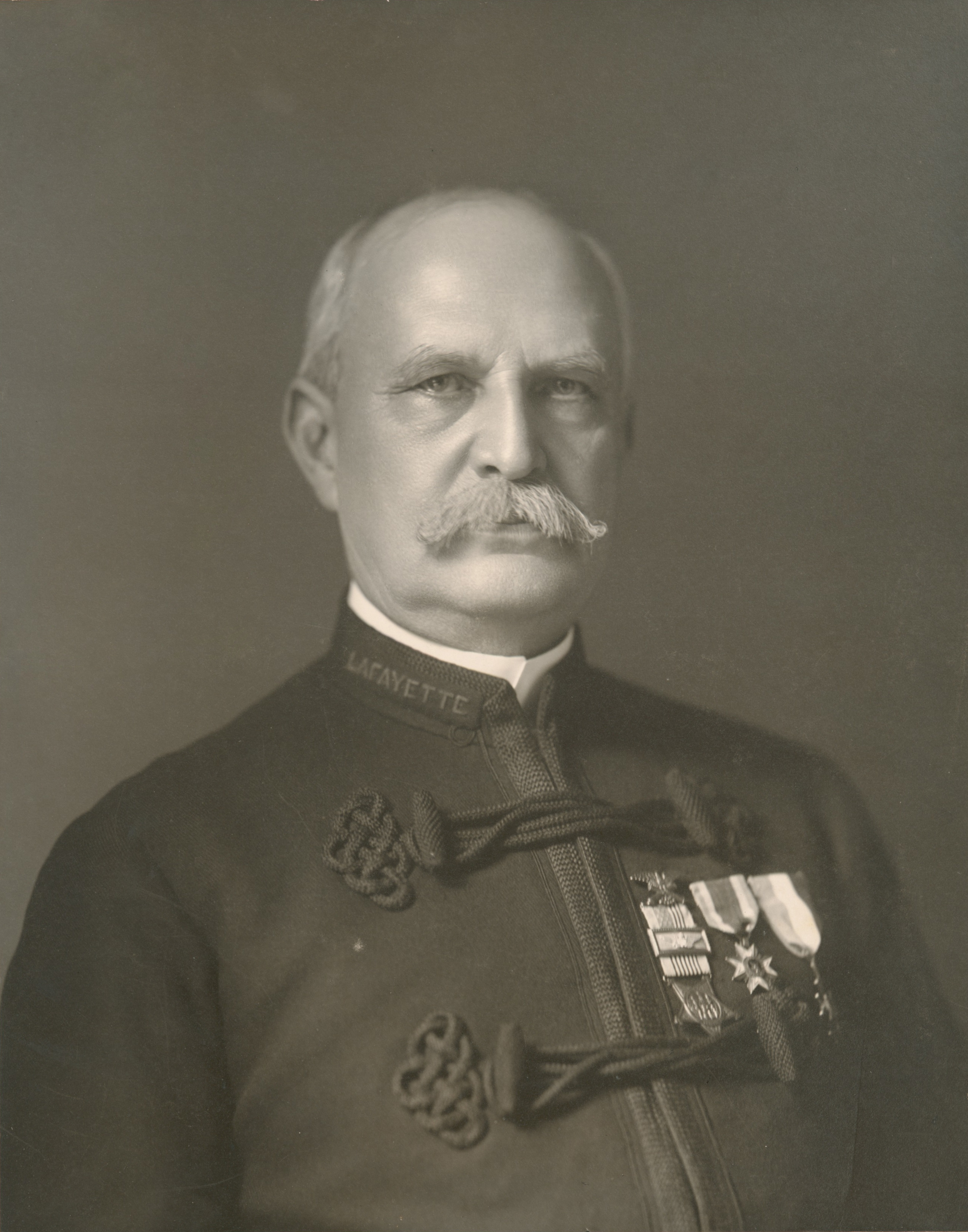
Mills in 1907

Abraham Gilbert Mills (March 12, 1844 – August 26, 1929) was an American baseball executive. He was the fourth president of the National League of Professional Base Ball Clubs (1883–1884), and is best known for heading the "Mills Commission" which controversially credited Civil War general Abner Doubleday with the invention of baseball.

== Early life ==
Mills was born on March 12, 1844, in New York City, and lived there until September 1862, when he enlisted in the United States Army. He served briefly as a private in the 5th New York Volunteer Infantry before mustering as a Sergeant in the 165th New York Infantry Regiment, considered a sister-regiment to the 5th New York Infantry. While in the service, Mills continued to play baseball and later recalled that he would always pack his bat and ball along with his field equipment. He participated in a well-attended Christmas Day baseball game at Hilton Head Island, South Carolina in 1862 between the 165th New York Volunteer Infantry and nine other soldiers from other Union Army regiments. A reported 40,000 soldiers were in attendance. In 1864, Mills was promoted 2nd Lieutenant, before being honorably discharged at Charleston, South Carolina on September 1 1865. After the Civil War, Mills became a veteran companion of the Military Order of the Loyal Legion of the United States as Companion No. 07469; and a member of the Grand Army of the Republic. He wears medals of both organizations in the photograph shown here.

After the war, Mills enrolled in Columbian Law School (now George Washington University) in Washington, D.C. to study law. While in Washington, Mills presided over the Olympic Base Ball Club for which he was also an occasional player. During his tenure, Mills tried unsuccessfully to recruit a young pitcher, Albert Spalding, whose career he would later come to influence. In 1872 Mills married Mary Chester Steele, and the couple had three daughters. After being admitted to the bar in 1876, he relocated his family to Chicago, Illinois where his career took an unexpected turn.

== National League presidency ==
During the late 19th century, it was common practice for professional leagues (such as the National League) to sign players already under contract with non-league teams. Usually, several teammates were recruited together, forcing the depleted non-league team to disband. Mills attacked the questionable ethics of the practice in a newspaper article and outlined a plan to prevent the raiding of non-league teams. William Hulbert, then president of the NL, noticed the article and solicited Mills for his advice on drafting an official solution, which resulted in the "League Alliance" (1877). Mills' contribution impressed the league, and he was hired on as an advisor. Following Hulbert's death in 1882, the league unanimously elected him president.

Mills' primary objective as president sought to prevent players from switching from one professional league to the next, which they typically did during mid-season in search of higher salaries. In 1888, Mills called an assembly of representatives from the three professional leagues—the National League, American Association, and Northwestern League—in what was dubbed as the "Harmony Conference." The meeting led to the creation of the "National Agreement of Professional Base Ball Clubs" (sometimes referred to as the "Tripartite Agreement"), which stated that every league team would be entitled to reserve 11 players at the end of a season to play for their current team throughout the next year. Unsurprisingly, the agreement was unpopular with players, who organized to form a new league for the 1884 season, the Union Association, which did not recognize the reserve rule or salary limitations. Mills reacted by threatening the defecting players with permanent expulsion and heavy fines, but many chose to leave anyway. Unfortunately, heavy financial losses and low attendance caused the UA and several participant teams to fold only after one season.

UA players later attempted to rejoin the NL, but Mills was particularly adamant about sticking to his word. In spite of Mills' objections, the league saw opportunity for boosting profits, and voted to allow the former UA players back in. In 1884, Mills resigned as league president, frustrated by yet another humiliating defeat of principle when Henry Lucas—none other than the founder of the UA—was voted back into the league as owner of a new St. Louis franchise. However, Mills continued to serve as an unofficial consultant on league matters.

== The Mills Commission ==
In 1888, Spalding accompanied a group of star players on a world tour to promote the game of baseball, playing an exhibition game in the shadow of the Great Pyramids of Egypt. Upon their return the following year, a dinner was held to honor the players and Mills was asked to serve as master of ceremonies. The dinner, held at Delmonico's Restaurant in New York, was attended by an eclectic and prestigious crowd of 300 guests, among them Mark Twain and Theodore Roosevelt. The event's main theme focused on the sport as America's ambassador to the world. Also emphasized was the notion that baseball had not, as many believed, evolved from the British game of rounders. Reportedly, at various points throughout the evening, audience members broke out into rousing chants of "No rounders! No rounders!". The display of patriotism intrigued Spalding and inspired a debate concerning baseball's origins, which came to a head in 1903 when Henry Chadwick published a widely read article for its part tracing baseball's evolution from rounders. In response, Spalding, who believed baseball was a fundamentally American invention, published an article disputing Chadwick's claim and challenged him by suggesting that they appoint a commission to settle the matter. Chadwick agreed, and in 1905 a commission headed by Mills was formed.

The "Mills Commission" featured Mills and six other prominent men: Morgan G. Bulkeley, the NL's first president in 1876; Arthur P. Gorman, a former player and ex-president of the Washington Base Ball Club; Nicholas E. Young, the first secretary and fifth president (replacing Mills) of the NL; Alfred J. Reach and George Wright, well known sporting goods distributors and two of the most famous players of their day; and James Edward Sullivan, president of the Amateur Athletic Union. The commission, through a series of nationally distributed publications, requested any American who had any knowledge concerning the origins of baseball to come forward. They received a response from a 71-year-old mining engineer from Denver, Colorado, named Abner Graves, which was published immediately under the headline: "Abner Doubleday Invented Base Ball." According to Graves' account, Doubleday was responsible for improving a local version of "Town Ball" being played by students of the Otsego Academy and Green's Select School in Cooperstown, New York. Graves also claimed to witness the actual formation of the game which Doubleday termed "Base Ball." The commission did not investigate Graves' claim, however, and accepted the story on the basis that Graves' account offered the kind of mythical beginning to a sport they wanted to promote as fundamentally American. A number of circumstantial inconsistencies suggested that Graves' story was most likely fabricated. Despite all of the unanswered questions, Mills wrote a memo known as the "Mills Commission Report" that proclaimed Doubleday the inventor of the game of baseball. For over half a century prior to coming under the scrutiny of historians, it remained the authoritative document on the issue. However, it is now accepted that Chadwick was correct in his belief that baseball had in fact evolved from the game of rounders. Mills himself may have had some doubts concerning the validity of his own commission's findings and he admitted that he had had no conclusive evidence to prove the Doubleday claim.

== Late career ==
The commission was Mills' last major role in professional baseball. Having long spent his career working for the Hale Elevator Company of Chicago, Mills became vice-president of one of its agents—the Otis Elevator Company—in 1898 and held the position until his death. In his later years, Mills was involved in amateur athletics, becoming the director and president of the New York Athletic Club and in 1921, penned the American Olympic Association constitution. At the time of his death in 1929 in Falmouth, Massachusetts, he presided over the Association for the Protection of the Adirondacks, and was involved in planning the 1932 Winter Olympics. He died on August 26, 1929, aged 85.

== See also ==
- Origins of baseball
