= William Wheaton =

American lawyer, politician, and baseball pioneer (1814-1889)

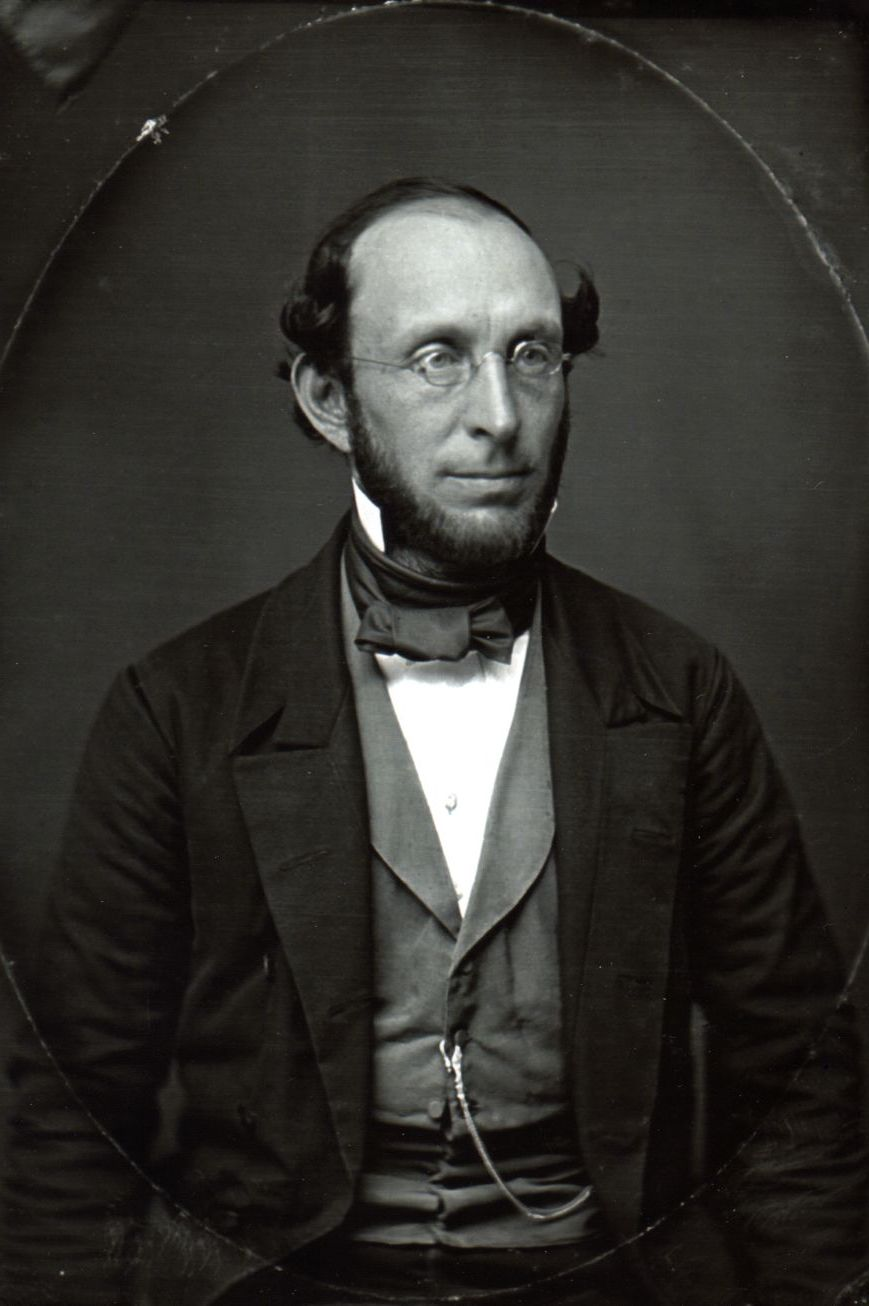
William Wheaton

William Rufus Wheaton (May 7, 1814 – September 11, 1888) was an American lawyer and politician. He was also a baseball pioneer.

== Personal life ==
Wheaton was born in New York City on May 7, 1814. He practiced law in New York during the 1830s and 1840s.

Wheaton married Elizabeth A. Jennings in 1837. The couple had seven children. Their son George Henry Wheaton served in the Civil War and reached the rank of major.

== Gotham and Knickerbocker Base Ball Clubs ==
During his free time, William Wheaton played base ball (as it was called in its developmental years). He was a founding member and the vice president of the Knickerbocker Base Ball Club in 1845. He served on the Committee of By-Laws with William H. Tucker and helped draft the game's first formal set of rules, which were adopted in September 1845. Wheaton also served as one of the sport's first umpires.

In 1887, Wheaton gave an interview to The San Francisco Daily Examiner, describing the early days of baseball in New York. He recalled that:

We played no exhibition or match games, but often our families would come over and look on with much enjoyment. Then we used to have dinner in the middle of the day, and twice a week we would spend the whole afternoon in ball play. We were all mature men and in business, but we didn't have too much of it as they do nowadays. There was none of that hurry and worry so characteristic of the present New York. We enjoyed life and didn't wear out so fast.

Wheaton also stated that he had drafted the first written code of rules for the Gotham Base Ball Club in 1837.

According to author Peter J. Nash, a strong argument could be made that Wheaton is worthy of enshrinement in the Baseball Hall of Fame. Paul Dickson states that Wheaton is among a group of men who could be called the "Father of Baseball"; this is also the stated opinion of Major League Baseball's official historian, John Thorn.

== California ==
In 1849, Wheaton sailed to San Francisco, California, with a mining company. The mining venture did not last long, and Wheaton soon began practicing law again.

Wheaton was also involved in local politics. He was elected City and County Assessor in 1861 and 1863. He served in the California State Assembly in 1862 and 1871. In 1876, he was appointed by US president Ulysses S. Grant the Register of the General Land Office of the United States, a capacity in which he served until 1886.

Wheaton died on September 11, 1888, at the age of 74.
