= Los Berros =

Los Berros may refer to:

- Los Berros, California
- Arroyo Los Berros
- Parque Los Berros
