= Comparison of baseball and softball =

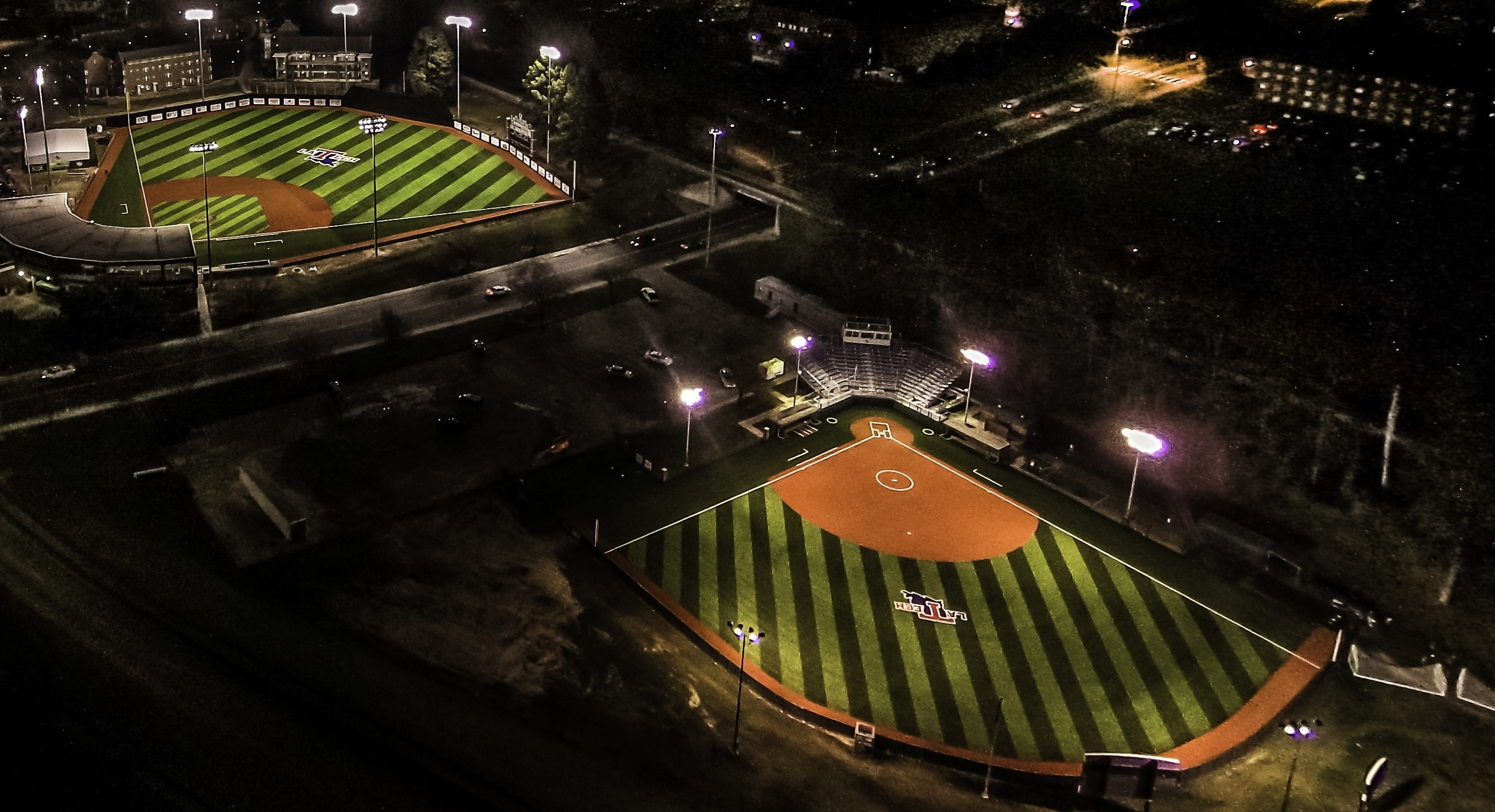
Baseball and softball fields, side by side

A comparison of the differences between baseball and softball can be made as softball is directly descended from baseball. An observer of one game would find the other very similar, but there are several important rule differences.

Fastpitch softball is more popular in competitive leagues, especially at the college and international tournament levels, while slow pitch is more popular in recreational leagues where the relative skill levels of different players may vary widely. The different rules of slowpitch can be viewed as maintaining a competitive balance for less skilled players by eliminating certain strategies (e.g., base stealing and bunting) which require a high level of skill to counter. Additionally, recreational leagues may impose their own ground rules, either for competitive balance or to meet local constraints (e.g., a time limit may be imposed on a game to ensure multiple games can be played in one day). A regulation softball is significantly larger than a regulation baseball. A softball measures between 11.88 and 12.13 inches in circumference and weighs between 6.25 and 7.00 ounces; a baseball measures between 9.00 and 9.25 inches in circumference and weighs between 5.00 and 5.25 ounces.

== Comparison ==
	Baseball	Fastpitch softball	Slowpitch softball
Game length	9 innings (7 in Minor League, high school, and college doubleheaders; 6 in Little League)	7 innings	7 innings
Equipment
Ball			
Ball	9–9.25 inches (22.9–23.5 cm) in circumference, 5–5.25 ounces (142–149 g) in weight, always white	11.875–12.125 inches (30.16–30.80 cm) in circumference, 6.25–7 ounces (177–198 g) in weight. (11 inches (280 mm) for children 10 and under), less dense than a baseball, optic yellow	12 inches (300 mm) in circumference for men, 11 inches (280 mm) for women; less dense than a baseball, white or optic yellow
Bat			
Bat	2.25–2.625 inches (5.72–6.67 cm) in diameter and no longer than 42 inches (110 cm). Must be made of wood at the professional level; may be made of aluminum in high school and college.	No more than 2.28125 inches (5.7944 cm) in diameter, no longer than 34 inches (86 cm) and no more than 38 ounces (1,100 g) in weight. Most commonly made of composite materials or aluminum, though wooden bats may be used	
Batting helmet			
Batting helmet	With protective guard when batting	With compulsory facemask	
Field
Layout diagram			
Baselines	90 feet (27 m)	60 feet (18 m)	
Double first base	No, except in youth leagues such as Little League	Used in games under WBSC rules; not used in NCAA	Allowed
Outfield fence	Variable distance from home plate is mandatory in professional and university leagues and optional in youth leagues. Many youth leagues, such as Little League, use a constant distance from home plate.	Variable distance from home plate, depending on the individual field. (maximum of 250 ft (76 m))	Constant distance from home plate, although some less organized leagues have no fences.
Pitching distance	60 feet 6 inches (18.44 m)	Varies by level: 40 feet (12 m) (youth), 43 feet (13 m) (adult women) or 46 feet (14 m) (adult men)	Varies by level: 46 feet (14 m) (youth), 50 feet (15 m) (adult)
Pitcher's area	Raised sloping mound, radius of 9 feet (2.7 m), maximum height 10 inches (25 cm)	Flat circle, the radius of 8 feet (2.4 m), marked with a white chalk circle	Pitching rubber only
Players
Fielders	Nine	Nine	Ten (fourth outfielder)
Extra player	A designated hitter (DH) may bat in place of a pitcher (rule varies by league; some levels allow DHs for other fielders)	One designated player (DP) may bat in place of a fielder.	Some leagues allow an arbitrary number of extra players, up to the entire roster.
Substitution	No player substituted for may return to the game, including the replaced player if the DH takes a defensive position. Under high school rules in the United States, a player may be substituted for and return to the game once. A pitcher who leaves the game may return, but only as a fielder (not the pitcher or DH).	Free defensive substitutions, provided each player occupies the same position in the batting order. If the DP takes a defensive position, the replaced player cannot return to the game.	Free defensive substitutions, provided each player occupies the same position in the batting order.
Batter
Bunting	Allowed.	Allowed.	Not allowed; the batter is out if contact is made.
Foul ball with two strikes	Batter is not out unless bunting.	Batter is not out unless bunting.	Batter is generally out. In many recreational leagues, a batter is allowed one foul ball with two strikes, with the second being an automatic out.
Hit by a pitch	Awarded first base unless swing, pitch in the strike zone, or no attempt made to avoid being hit.	Awarded first base unless swing, pitch in the strike zone, or attempt made to intentionally be hit, although this is rarely called by the umpire.	Not awarded first base.
Runner
Base stealing	Allowed at any time the ball is live (i.e. when "time" is not called).	Allowed once the ball leaves the pitcher's hand; runners may not leave base if the pitcher has the ball within the circle.	Generally not allowed, although some levels may permit stealing after a pitched ball crosses the plate or touches the ground.
Leading from base	Same rules as for base stealing	Same rules as for base stealing	Runner is usually permitted to take a lead after the ball leaves the pitcher's hand, but must return to base between pitches if the ball is not put into play. The runner can be called out for taking a lead before the pitch.
Pitching
Delivery			
Delivery	Any method; in practice, usually overhand.	Underhand; no speed or arc restrictions.	Underhand; must travel in an arc and within certain height restrictions (a common range is between 6 and 12 feet (1.8 and 3.7 m) above the ground). Umpire can call a pitch "illegal" while in flight.
Illegal pitch	Most infractions punished as a balk.	The ball remains live. If the batter reaches base successfully and all runners advance, no penalty; otherwise, the play is negated, the pitch attempt is automatically a ball and runners advance one base.	The ball remains live. If the batter does not swing, the pitch is automatically a ball.

== See also ==
- Baseball rules
- Comparison between cricket and baseball
- Baseball5's differences from baseball and softball
