= Baseball =

Bat-and-ball game

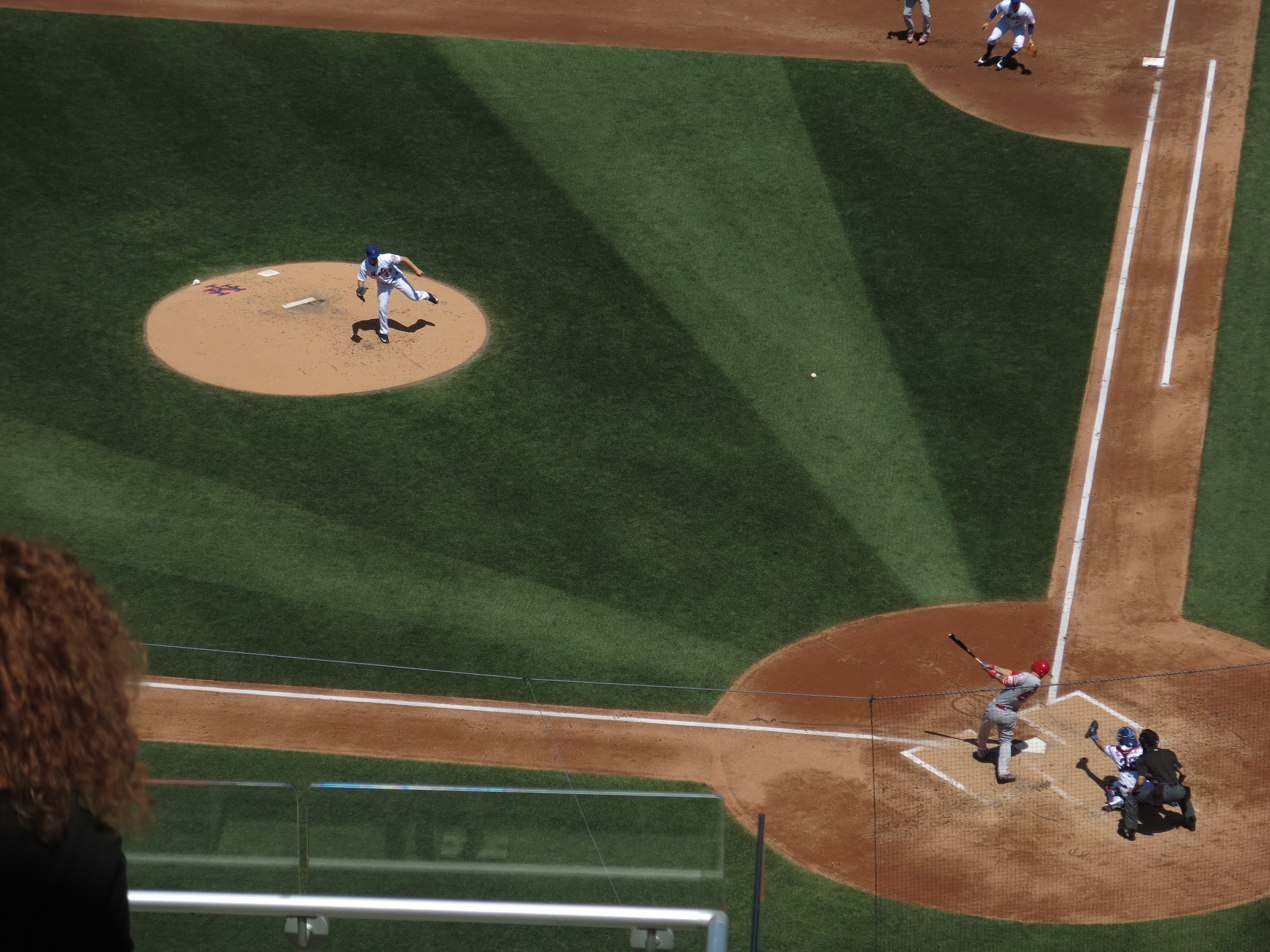
- Los Angeles Angels center fielder Mike Trout hits a home run off a pitch from New York Mets pitcher Tommy Milone on May 21, 2017
- Highest governing body: World Baseball Softball Confederation
- First played: 18th-century England (predecessors); 19th-century United States (modern version)

Characteristics
- Contact: Tagging-only
- Team members: 10 players: pitcher catcher first baseman second baseman third baseman shortstop left fielder center fielder right fielder designated hitter
- Mixed-sex: Yes, separate competitions
- Type: Team sport, bat-and-ball
- Equipment: Baseball; Baseball bat Baseball glove Batting helmet Catcher's gear
- Venue: Baseball park Baseball field
- Glossary: Glossary of baseball terms

Presence
- Country or region: Worldwide (most prominent in the Americas and East Asia)
- Olympic: Demonstration sport: 1912, 1936, 1952, 1956, 1964, 1984 and 1988; Medal sport: 1992–2008, 2020
- World Games: 1981

Baseball is a bat-and-ball sport played between two teams of nine players each, taking turns batting and fielding. Gameplay centers around the pitcher on the fielding team throwing a baseball to a batter on the opposing team, who tries to hit it into the field of play. Successfully batted balls allow players on the batting team to advance around a circuit of four bases and score runs. Meanwhile, the fielding team attempts to "put out" the batters and baserunners, removing them from play and preventing them from scoring. Once the fielding team records three outs, the offensive and defensive sides switch roles. Play continues until a defined number of innings have been completed, whereupon the team with the most runs wins.

Baseball evolved from older bat-and-ball games that gained popularity in England during the mid-18th century. Immigrants brought these games to North America, where modern baseball developed into organized clubs playing under codified rules by the mid-19th century. Baseball's American origins, as well as its reputation as a source of escapism during troubled points in American history such as the American Civil War and the Great Depression, have led the sport to receive the moniker of "America's Pastime". Since the late 19th century, it has been unofficially recognized as the national sport of the United States, though in modern times is less popular than some other sports. In addition to North America, baseball spread throughout the rest of the Americas and the Asia–Pacific in the 19th and 20th centuries, and is now among the most popular sports in parts of Central and South America, the Caribbean, and East Asia, particularly in Japan, South Korea, and Taiwan.

In Major League Baseball (MLB), the highest level of professional baseball in the United States and Canada, teams are divided into the National League (NL) and American League (AL), each with three divisions: East, West, and Central. The MLB champion is determined by playoffs that culminate in the World Series. The top level of play is similarly split in Japan between the Central and Pacific Leagues and in Cuba between the West League and East League. The World Baseball Classic, organized by the World Baseball Softball Confederation, is the major international competition of the sport and attracts the top national teams from around the world. Baseball was played at the Olympic Games from 1992 to 2008 and in 2020, and will return in 2028.

== Rules and gameplay ==
=== Overview ===
Diagram of a baseball field. Diamond may refer to the square area defined by the four bases or to the entire playing field. The dimensions given are for professional and professional-style games. Children often play on smaller fields.

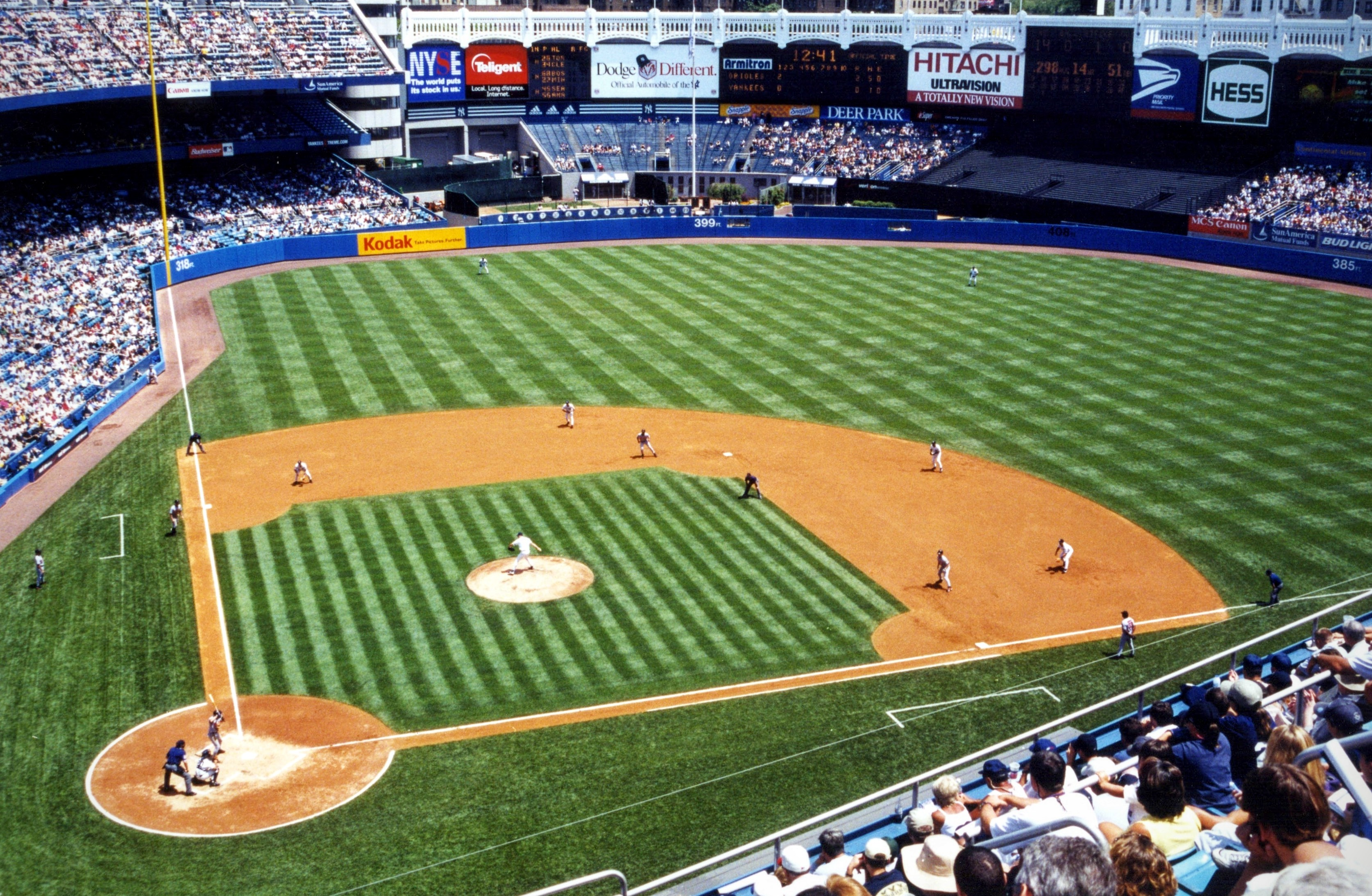
The New York Yankees play against the Baltimore Orioles at Yankee Stadium (1923) in 2000.

A baseball game is played between two teams, each composed of nine players, that take turns playing offense (batting and baserunning) and defense (pitching and fielding). A pair of turns, one at bat and one in the field, by each team constitutes an inning. A game consists of nine innings (seven innings at the high school level and in doubleheaders in college and Minor League Baseball; and six innings at the Little League level). One team—customarily the visiting team—bats in the top, or first half, of every inning. The other team—customarily the home team—bats in the bottom, or second half, of every inning.

The goal of the game is to score more points (runs) than the other team. The players on the team at bat attempt to score runs by touching all four bases, in order, set at the corners of the square-shaped baseball diamond. A player bats at home plate and must attempt to safely reach a base before proceeding, counterclockwise, from first base, to second base, third base, and back home to score a run. The team in the field attempts to prevent runs from scoring by recording outs, which remove opposing players from offensive action until their next turn at bat comes up again. When three outs are recorded, the teams switch roles for the next half-inning. If the score of the game is tied after nine innings, extra innings are played to resolve the contest. Many amateur games, particularly unorganized ones, involve different numbers of players and innings.

The game is played on a field whose primary boundaries, the foul lines, extend forward from home plate at 45-degree angles. The 90-degree area within the foul lines is referred to as fair territory; the 270-degree area outside them is foul territory. The part of the field enclosed by the bases and several yards beyond them is the infield; the area farther beyond the infield is the outfield. In the middle of the infield is a raised pitcher's mound, with a rectangular rubber plate (the rubber) at its center. The outer boundary of the outfield is typically demarcated by a raised fence, which may be of any material and height. The fair territory between home plate and the outfield boundary is baseball's field of play, though significant events can take place in foul territory, as well.

There are three basic tools of baseball: the ball, the bat, and the glove or mitt:

- The baseball is about the size of an adult's fist, around 9 inches (23 centimeters) in circumference. It has a rubber or cork center, wound in yarn and covered in white cowhide, with red stitching.
- The bat is a hitting tool, traditionally made of a single, solid piece of wood. Other materials are now commonly used for nonprofessional games. It is a hard round stick, about 2.5 inches (6.4 centimeters) in diameter at the hitting end, tapering to a narrower handle and culminating in a knob. Bats used by adults are typically around 34 inches (86 centimeters) long, and not longer than 42 inches (110 centimeters).
- The glove or mitt is a fielding tool, made of padded leather with webbing between the fingers. As an aid in catching and holding onto the ball, it takes various shapes to meet the specific needs of different fielding positions.

Protective helmets are also standard equipment for all batters.

=== Fielding positions ===
Diagram indicating the standard layout of positions

At the beginning of each half-inning, the nine players of the fielding team arrange themselves around the field. One of them, the pitcher, stands on the pitcher's mound. The pitcher begins the pitching delivery with one foot on the rubber, pushing off it to gain velocity when throwing toward home plate. Another fielding team player, the catcher, squats on the far side of home plate, facing the pitcher. The rest of the fielding team faces home plate, typically arranged as four infielders—who set up along or within a few yards outside the imaginary lines (basepaths) between first, second, and third base—and three outfielders. In the standard arrangement, there is a first baseman positioned several steps to the left of first base, a second baseman to the right of second base, a shortstop to the left of second base, and a third baseman to the right of third base. The basic outfield positions are left fielder, center fielder, and right fielder. With the exception of the catcher, all fielders are required to be in fair territory when the pitch is delivered. A neutral umpire sets up behind the catcher. Other umpires will be distributed around the field as well.

=== Offense ===
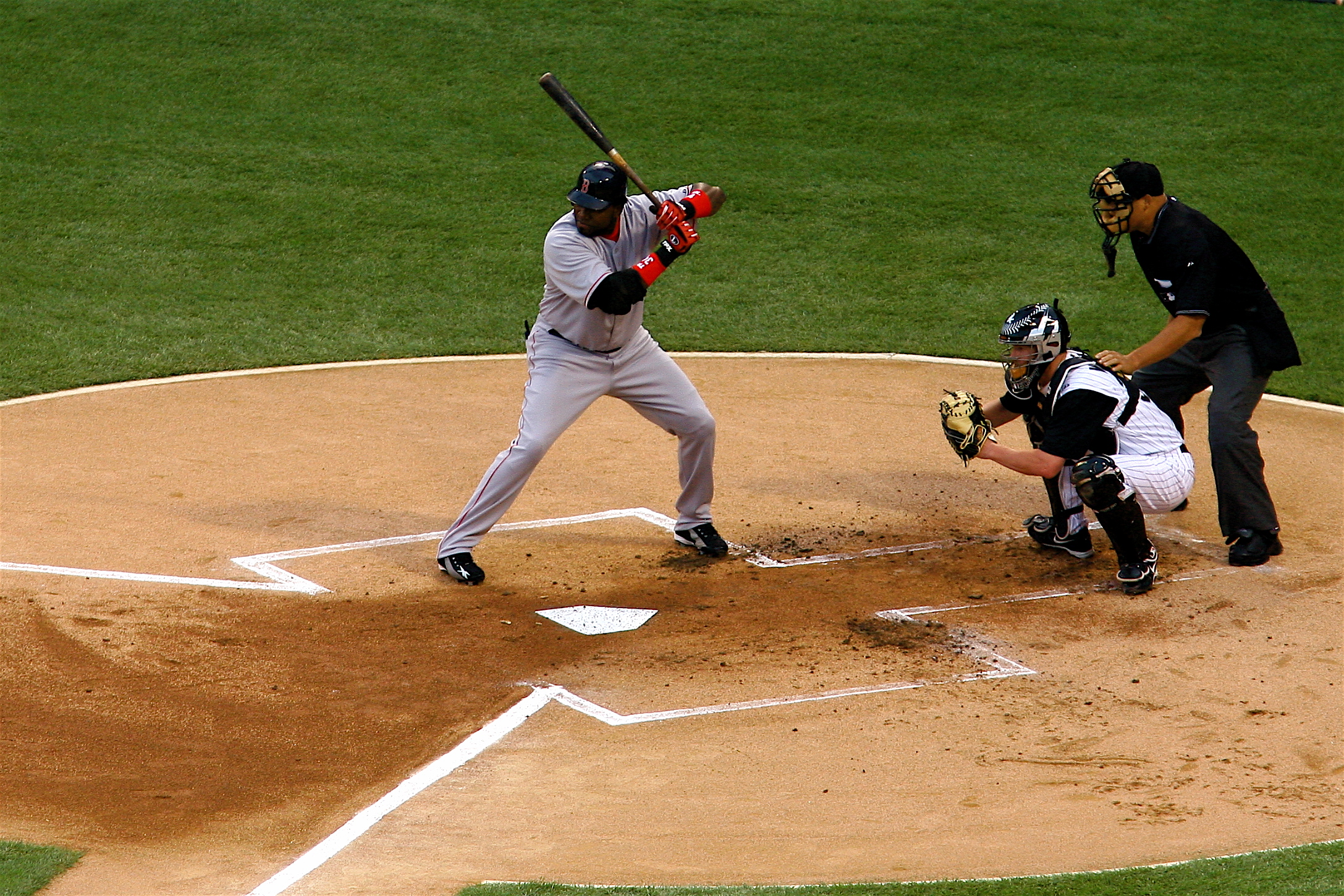
David Ortiz, the batter, awaiting a pitch, with the catcher and umpire

Play starts with a member of the batting team, the batter, standing in either of the two batter's boxes next to home plate, holding a bat. The batter waits for the pitcher to throw a pitch (the ball) toward home plate, and attempts to hit the ball with the bat. The catcher catches pitches that the batter does not hit—as a result of either electing not to swing or failing to connect—and returns them to the pitcher. A batter who hits the ball into the field of play must drop the bat and begin running toward first base, at which point the player is referred to as a runner (or, until the play is over, a batter-runner).

A batter-runner who reaches first base without being put out is said to be safe and is on base. A batter-runner may choose to remain at first base or attempt to advance to second base or even beyond—however far the player believes can be reached safely. A player who reaches base despite proper play by the fielders has recorded a hit. A player who reaches first base safely on a hit is credited with a single. If a player makes it to second base safely as a direct result of a hit, it is a double; third base, a triple. If the ball is hit in the air within the foul lines over the entire outfield (and outfield fence, if there is one), or if the batter-runner otherwise safely circles all the bases, it is a home run: the batter and any runners on base may all freely circle the bases, each scoring a run. This is the most desirable result for the batter. The ultimate and most desirable result possible for a batter would be to hit a home run while all three bases are occupied or "loaded", thus scoring four runs on a single hit. This is called a grand slam. A player who reaches base due to a fielding mistake is not credited with a hit—instead, the responsible fielder is charged with an error.

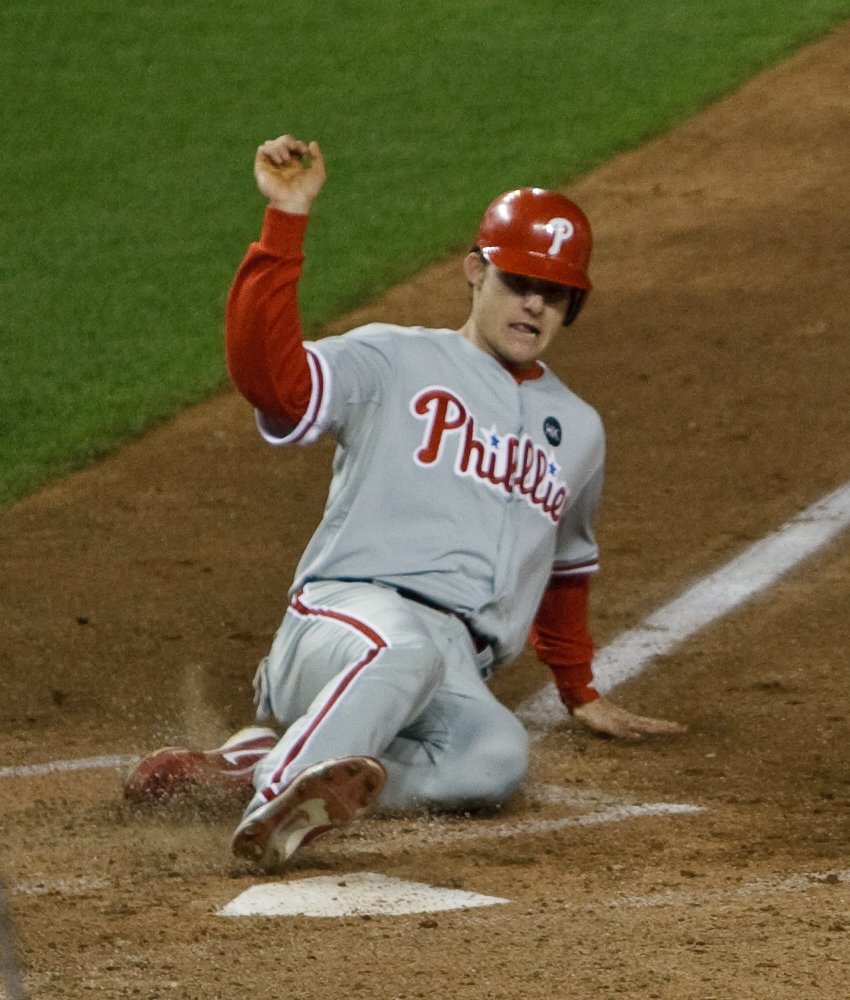
A runner sliding into home plate and scoring.

Any runners already on base may attempt to advance on batted balls that land, or contact the ground, in fair territory, before or after the ball lands. A runner on first base must attempt to advance if a ball lands in play, as only one runner may occupy a base at any given time; the same applies for other runners if they are on a base that a teammate is forced to advance to. If a ball hit into play rolls foul before passing through the infield, it becomes dead and any runners must return to the base they occupied when the play began. If the ball is hit in the air and caught before it lands, the batter has flied out and any runners on base may attempt to advance only if they tag up (contact the base they occupied when the play began, as or after the ball is caught). Runners may also attempt to advance to the next base while the pitcher is in the process of delivering the ball to home plate; a successful effort is a stolen base.

=== Defense ===
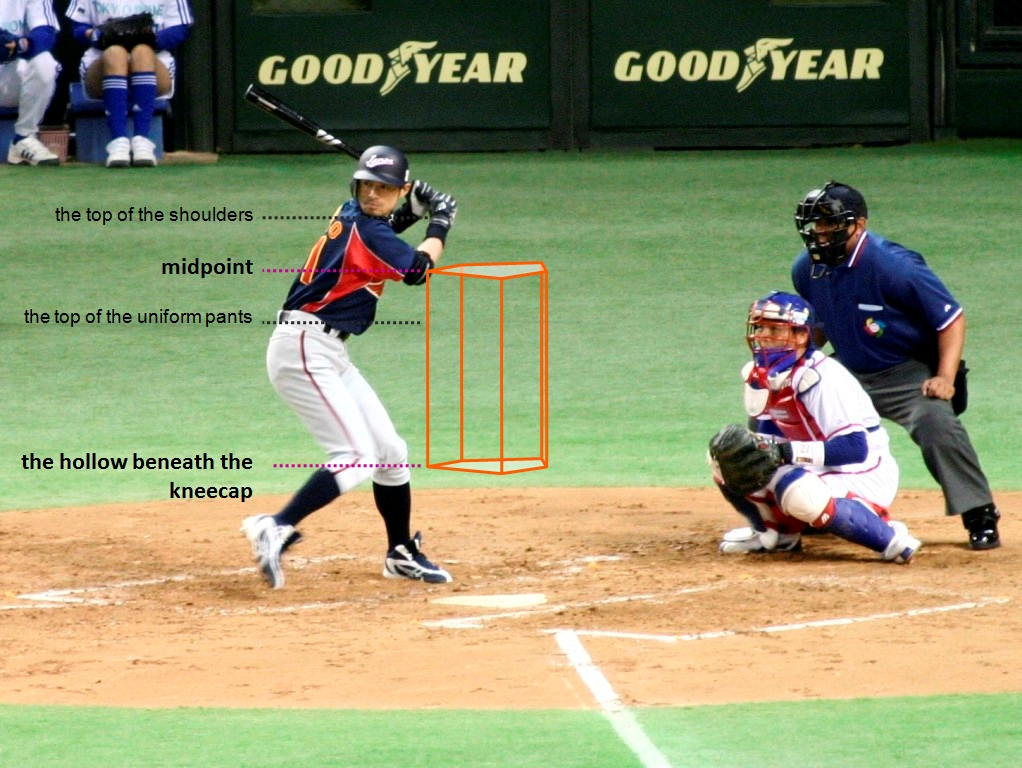
The strike zone determines the result of most pitches, and varies in vertical length for each batter.

A pitch that is not hit into the field of play is called either a strike or a ball. A batter against whom three strikes are recorded strikes out. A batter against whom four balls are recorded is awarded a base on balls or walk, a free advance to first base. (A batter may also freely advance to first base if the batter's body or uniform is struck by a pitch outside the strike zone, provided the batter does not swing and attempts to avoid being hit.) Crucial to determining balls and strikes is the umpire's judgment as to whether a pitch has passed through the strike zone, a conceptual area above home plate extending from the midpoint between the batter's shoulders and belt down to the hollow of the knee. Any pitch which does not pass through the strike zone is called a ball, unless the batter either swings and misses at the pitch, or hits the pitch into foul territory; an exception generally occurs if the ball is hit into foul territory when the batter already has two strikes, in which case neither a ball nor a strike is called.

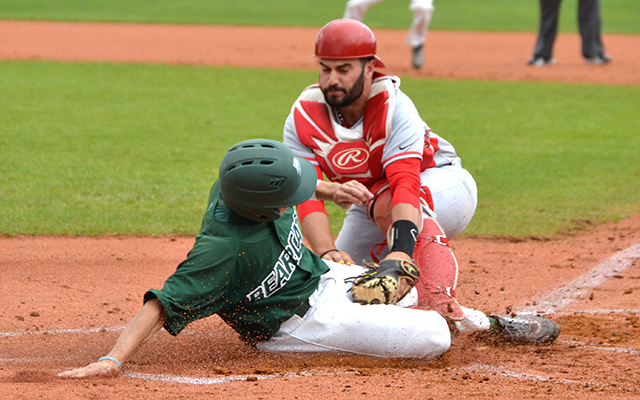
A Binghamton Bearcats baseball player slides into home plate as a Hartford Hawks catcher applies a tag, 2014.

While the team at bat is trying to score runs, the team in the field is attempting to record outs. In addition to the strikeout and flyout, common ways a member of the batting team may be put out include the ground out, force out, and tag out. These occur either when a runner is forced to advance to a base, and a fielder with possession of the ball reaches that base before the runner does, or the runner is touched by the ball, held in a fielder's hand, while not on a base. (The batter-runner is always forced to advance to first base, and any other runners must advance to the next base if a teammate is forced to advance to their base.) It is possible to record two outs in the course of the same play. This is called a double play. Three outs in one play, a triple play, is possible, though rare. Players put out or retired must leave the field, returning to their team's dugout or bench. A runner may be stranded on base when a third out is recorded against another player on the team. Stranded runners do not benefit the team in its next turn at bat as every half-inning begins with the bases empty.

=== Batting order and substitution ===
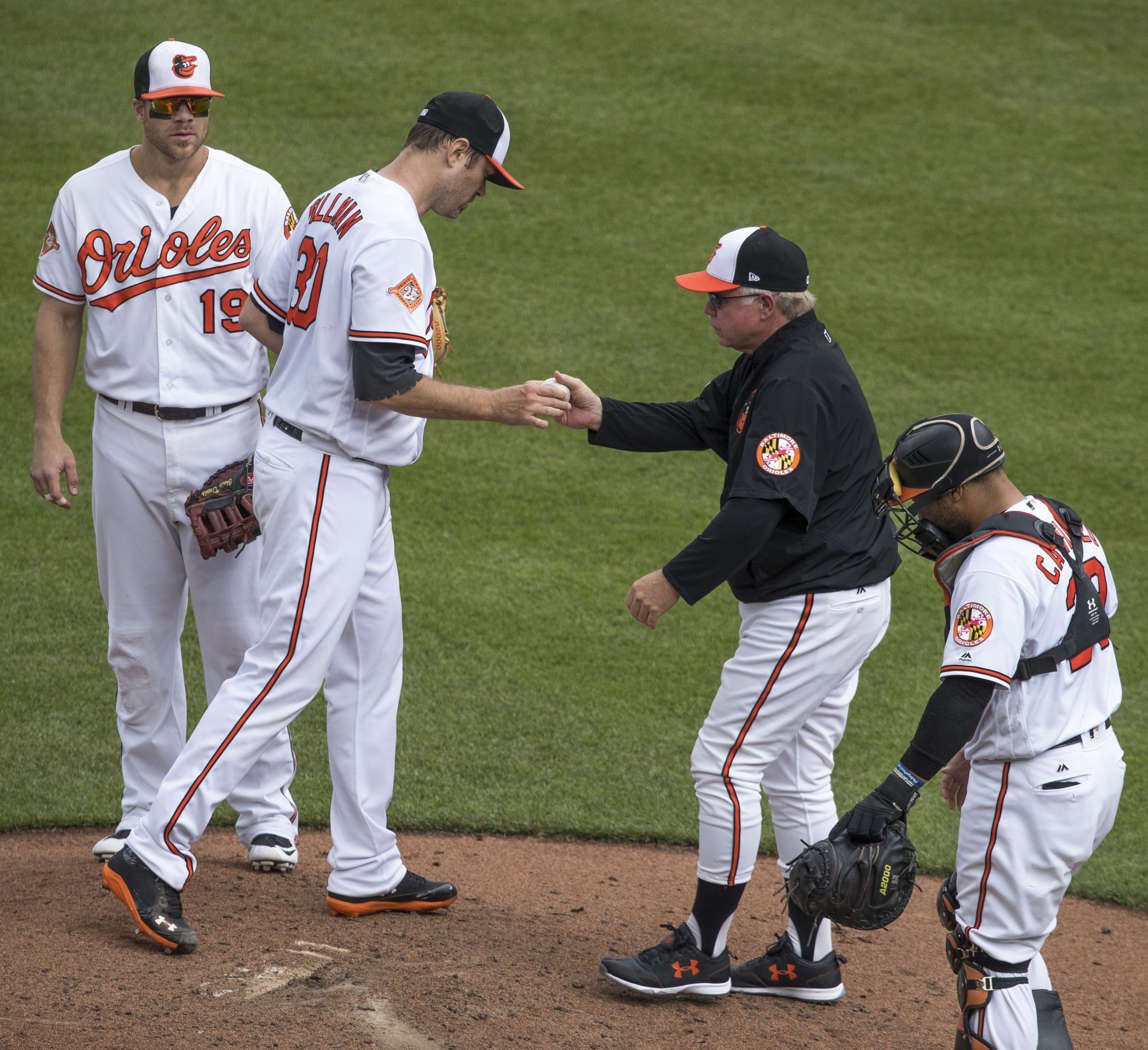
A pitcher handing off the ball after being taken out of the game during a mound meeting.

An individual player's turn batting or plate appearance is complete when the player reaches base, hits a home run, makes an out, or hits a ball that results in the team's third out, even if it is recorded against a teammate. On rare occasions, a batter may be at the plate when, without the batter's hitting the ball, a third out is recorded against a teammate—for instance, a runner getting caught stealing (tagged out attempting to steal a base). A batter with this sort of incomplete plate appearance starts off the team's next turn batting; any balls or strikes recorded against the batter the previous inning are erased.

A runner may circle the bases only once per plate appearance and thus can score at most a single run per batting turn. Once a player has completed a plate appearance, that player may not bat again until the eight other members of the player's team have all taken their turn at bat in the batting order. The batting order is set before the game begins, and may not be altered except for substitutions. Once a player has been removed for a substitute, that player may not reenter the game. Children's games often have more lenient rules, such as Little League rules, which allow players to be substituted back into the same game.

If the designated hitter (DH) rule is in effect, each team has a tenth player whose sole responsibility is to bat (and run). The DH takes the place of another player—almost invariably the pitcher—in the batting order, but does not field. Thus, even with the DH, each team still has a batting order of nine players and a fielding arrangement of nine players.

== Personnel ==
=== Players ===
The number of players on a baseball roster, or squad, varies by league and by the level of organized play. A Major League Baseball (MLB) team has a roster of 26 players with specific roles. A typical roster features the following players:

- Eight position players: the catcher, four infielders, and three outfielders—all of whom play on a regular basis
- Five starting pitchers who constitute the team's pitching rotation or starting rotation
- Seven relief pitchers, including one closer, who constitute the team's bullpen (named for the off-field area where pitchers warm up)
- One backup, or substitute, catcher
- Five backup infielders and backup outfielders, or players who can play multiple positions, known as utility players.

Most baseball leagues worldwide have the DH rule, including MLB, Japan's Pacific League, and Caribbean professional leagues, along with major American amateur organizations. The Central League in Japan does not have the rule and high-level minor league clubs connected to National League teams are not required to field a DH. In leagues that apply the designated hitter rule, a typical team has nine offensive regulars (including the DH), five starting pitchers, seven or eight relievers, a backup catcher, and two or three other reserve players.

=== Managers and coaches ===
Mark Canha talks with New York Mets First Base Coach Wayne Kirby

The manager, or head coach, oversees the team's major strategic decisions, such as establishing the starting rotation, setting the lineup, or batting order, before each game, and making substitutions during games—in particular, bringing in relief pitchers. Managers are typically assisted by two or more coaches; they may have specialized responsibilities, such as working with players on hitting, fielding, pitching, or strength and conditioning. At most levels of organized play, two coaches are stationed on the field when the team is at bat: the first base coach and third base coach, who occupy designated coaches' boxes, just outside the foul lines. These coaches assist in the direction of baserunners, when the ball is in play, and relay tactical signals from the manager to batters and runners, during pauses in play. In contrast to many other team sports, baseball managers and coaches generally wear their team's uniforms; coaches must be in uniform to be allowed on the field to confer with players during a game.

=== Umpires ===
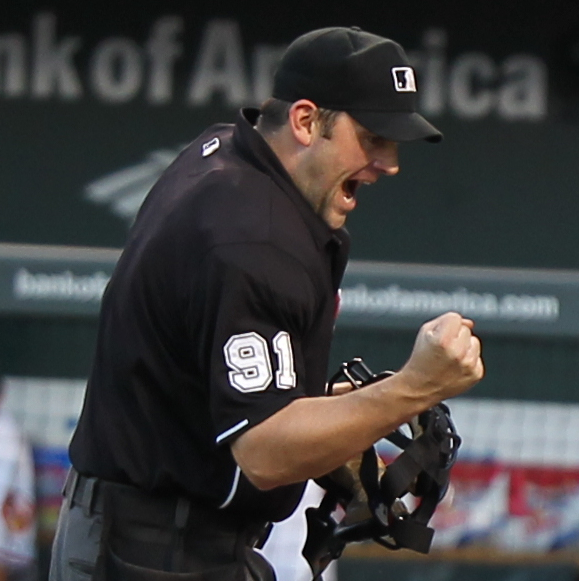
Home Plate Umpire Brian Knight calls out Derrek Lee

Any baseball game involves one or more umpires, who make rulings on the outcome of each play. At a minimum, one umpire will stand behind the catcher, to have a good view of the strike zone, and call balls and strikes. Additional umpires may be stationed near the other bases, thus making it easier to judge plays such as attempted force outs and tag outs. In MLB, four umpires are used for each game, one near each base. In the playoffs, six umpires are used: one at each base and two in the outfield along the foul lines.

== Strategy ==
Many of the pre-game and in-game strategic decisions in baseball revolve around a fundamental fact: in general, right-handed batters tend to be more successful against left-handed pitchers and, to an even greater degree, left-handed batters tend to be more successful against right-handed pitchers. A manager with several left-handed batters in the regular lineup, who knows the team will be facing a left-handed starting pitcher, may respond by starting one or more of the right-handed backups on the team's roster. During the late innings of a game, as relief pitchers and pinch hitters are brought in, the opposing managers will often go back and forth trying to create favorable matchups with their substitutions. The manager of the fielding team trying to arrange same-handed pitcher-batter matchups and the manager of the batting team trying to arrange opposite-handed matchups. With a team that has the lead in the late innings, a manager may remove a starting position player—especially one whose turn at bat is not likely to come up again—for a more skillful fielder (known as a defensive substitution).

== Tactics ==
=== Pitching and fielding ===
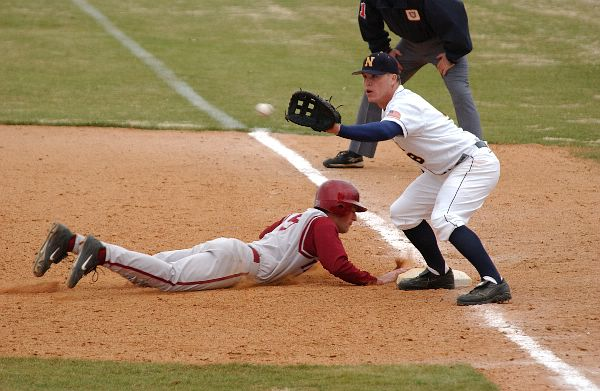
A first baseman receives a pickoff throw, as the runner dives back to first base.

The tactical decision that precedes almost every play in a baseball game involves pitch selection. By gripping and then releasing the baseball in a certain manner, and by throwing it at a certain speed, pitchers can cause the baseball to break to either side, or downward, as it approaches the batter, thus creating differing pitches that can be selected. Among the resulting wide variety of pitches that may be thrown, the four basic types are the fastball, the changeup (or off-speed pitch), and two breaking balls—the curveball and the slider. Pitchers have different repertoires of pitches they are skillful at throwing. Conventionally, before each pitch, the catcher signals the pitcher what type of pitch to throw, as well as its general vertical or horizontal location. If there is disagreement on the selection, the pitcher may shake off the sign and the catcher will call for a different pitch.

With a runner on base and taking a lead, the pitcher may attempt a pickoff, a quick throw to a fielder covering the base to keep the runner's lead in check or, optimally, effect a tag out. Pickoff attempts, however, are subject to rules that severely restrict the pitcher's movements before and during the pickoff attempt. Violation of any one of these rules could result in the umpire calling a balk against the pitcher, which permits any runners on base to advance one base with impunity. If an attempted stolen base is anticipated, the catcher may call for a pitchout, a ball thrown deliberately off the plate, allowing the catcher to catch it while standing and throw quickly to a base. Facing a batter with a strong tendency to hit to one side of the field, the fielding team may employ a shift, with most or all of the fielders moving to the left or right of their usual positions. With a runner on third base, the infielders may play in, moving closer to home plate to improve the odds of throwing out the runner on a ground ball, though a sharply hit grounder is more likely to carry through a drawn-in infield.

=== Batting and baserunning ===
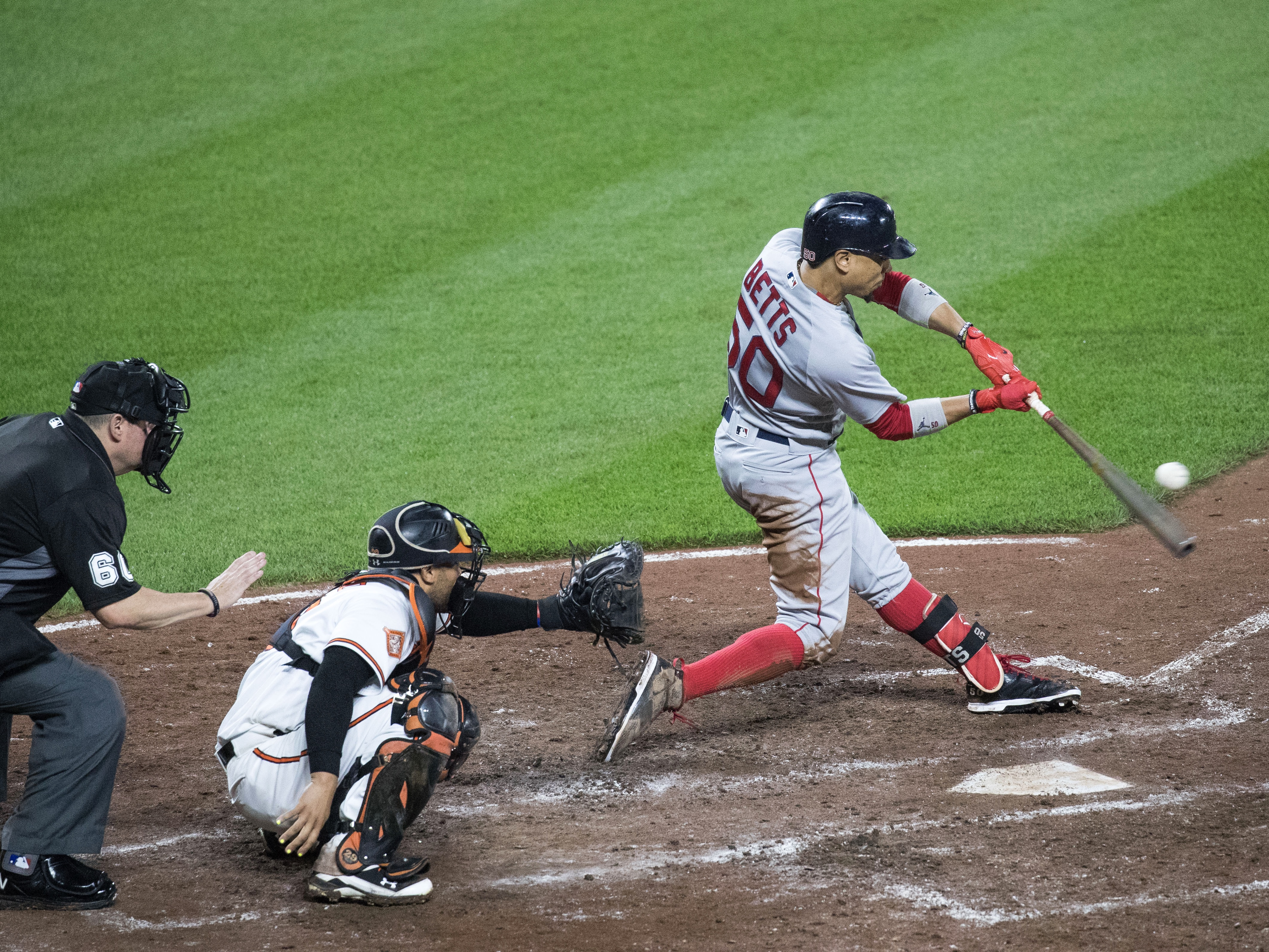
Boston Red Sox player Mookie Betts hits a pitch by swinging his bat.

Several basic offensive tactics come into play with a runner on first base, including the choice of whether to attempt a steal of second base. The hit and run is sometimes employed, with a skillful contact hitter, the runner takes off with the pitch, drawing the shortstop or second baseman over to second base, creating a gap in the infield for the batter to poke the ball through. The sacrifice bunt, calls for the batter to focus on making soft contact with the ball, so that it rolls a short distance into the infield, allowing the runner to advance into scoring position as the batter is thrown out at first. A batter, particularly one who is a fast runner, may also attempt to bunt for a hit. A sacrifice bunt employed with a runner on third base, aimed at bringing that runner home, is known as a squeeze play. With a runner on third and fewer than two outs, a batter may instead concentrate on hitting a fly ball that, even if it is caught, will be deep enough to allow the runner to tag up and score—a successful batter, in this case, gets credit for a sacrifice fly. In order to increase the chance of advancing a batter to first base via a walk, the manager will sometimes signal a batter who is ahead in the count (i.e., has more balls than strikes) to take, or not swing at, the next pitch. The batter's potential reward of reaching base (via a walk) exceeds the disadvantage if the next pitch is a strike.

== History ==
Consensus once held that today's baseball is a North American development from the older game rounders, popular among children in Great Britain and Ireland. American baseball historian David Block suggests that the game originated in England; recently uncovered historical evidence supports this position. According to Block and official MLB historian John Thorn, this earlier version of baseball may have involved hitting the ball with a hand, making it akin to today's punchball. Block argues that rounders and early baseball were actually regional variants of each other, and that the game's most direct antecedents are the English games of stoolball and "tut-ball". The earliest known reference to baseball is in a 1744 British publication, A Little Pretty Pocket-Book, by John Newbery. Block discovered that the first recorded game of "Base Ball" took place in 1749 in Surrey, and featured the Prince of Wales as a player. This early form of the game was apparently brought to Canada by English immigrants.

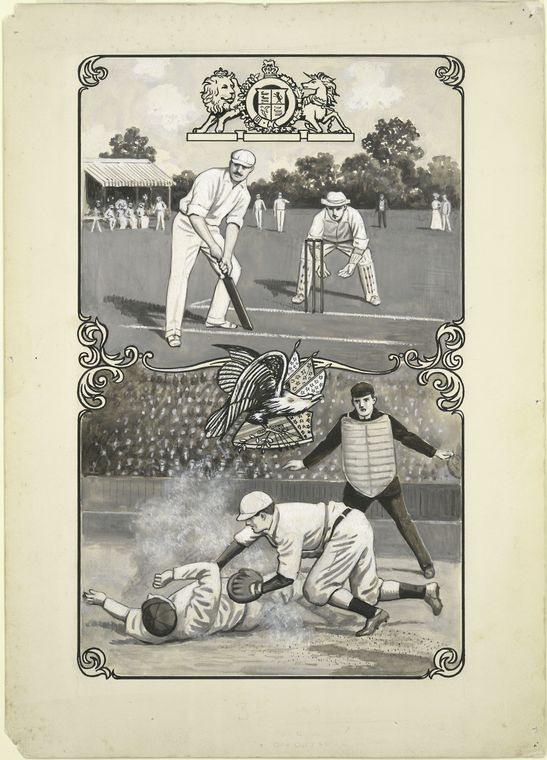
By the 1860s Civil War, baseball (bottom) had overtaken its fellow bat-and-ball sport cricket (top) in popularity within the United States. (Note: Partially because baseball was much shorter in duration than the form of cricket played at the time and did not require a special playing surface.) Growing American influence abroad meant the same occurred in Japan and the Dominican Republic by the early 20th century.

By the early 1830s, there were reports of a variety of uncodified bat-and-ball games recognizable as early forms of baseball being played around North America. The first recorded baseball game in North America was played in Beachville, Ontario, Canada, on June 4, 1838. In 1845, Alexander Cartwright, a member of New York City's Knickerbocker Club, led the codification of the so-called Knickerbocker Rules, which in turn were based on rules developed in 1837 by William R. Wheaton of the Gotham Club. While there are reports that the New York Knickerbockers played games in 1845, the contest long recognized as the first recorded baseball game in U.S. history took place on June 19, 1846, in Hoboken, New Jersey: the "New York Nine" defeated the Knickerbockers, 23–1, in four innings. With the Knickerbocker code as the basis, the rules of modern baseball continued to evolve over the next half-century. The game then went on to spread throughout the Pacific Rim and the Americas, with Americans backing the sport as a way to spread American values.

=== In the United States ===
==== Establishment of professional leagues ====
In the mid-1850s, a baseball craze hit the New York metropolitan area, and by 1856, local journals were referring to baseball as the "national pastime" or "national game". A year later, the sport's first governing body, the National Association of Base Ball Players, was formed. In 1867, it barred participation by African Americans. The more formally structured National League was founded in 1876. Professional Negro leagues formed, but quickly folded. In 1887, softball, under the name of indoor baseball or indoor-outdoor, was invented as a winter version of the parent game. The American League evolved from the minor Western League, which was reorganized under Ban Johnson in 1893. It was not until 1901 that the American League was formally established as a major league. By 1893, crucial structural changes, such as moving the pitching distance to 60 feet, 6 inches, cemented the modern rulebook.

The National Agreement of 1903 formalized relations both between the two major leagues and between them and the National Association of Professional Base Ball Leagues, representing most of the country's minor professional leagues. The World Series, pitting the two major league champions against each other, was inaugurated that fall. The Black Sox Scandal of the 1919 World Series led to the formation of the office of the Commissioner of Baseball. The first commissioner, Kenesaw Mountain Landis, was elected in 1920. That year also saw the founding of the Negro National League; the first significant Negro league, it would operate until 1931. For part of the 1920s, it was joined by the Eastern Colored League.

==== Rise of Ruth and racial integration ====
Compared with the present, professional baseball in the early 20th century was lower-scoring, and pitchers were more dominant. This so-called "dead-ball era" ended in the early 1920s with several changes in rule and circumstance that were advantageous to hitters. Strict new regulations that governed the ball's size, shape and composition, along with a new rule officially banning the spitball and other pitches that depended on the ball being treated or roughed-up with foreign substances, resulted in a ball that traveled farther when hit. The rise of the legendary player Babe Ruth, the first great power hitter of the new era, helped permanently alter the nature of the game. In the late 1920s and early 1930s, St. Louis Cardinals general manager Branch Rickey invested in several minor league clubs and developed the first modern farm system. A new Negro National League was organized in 1933; four years later, it was joined by the Negro American League. The first elections to the National Baseball Hall of Fame took place in 1936. In 1939, Little League Baseball was founded in Pennsylvania.

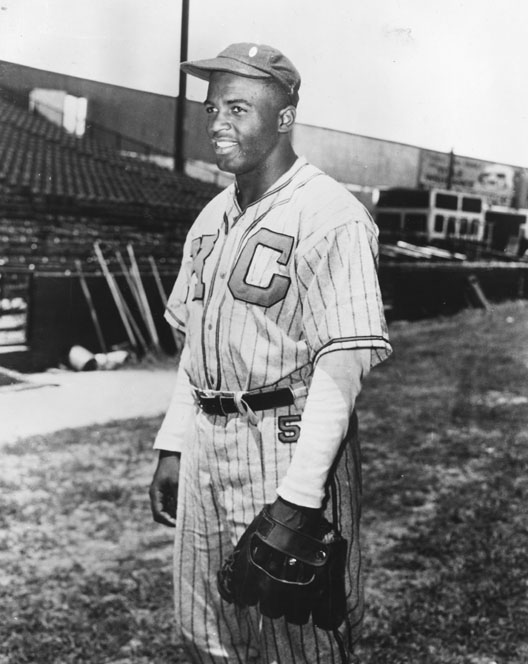
Jackie Robinson in 1945, with the Negro American League's Kansas City Monarchs

Many minor league teams disbanded when World War II led to a player shortage. Chicago Cubs owner Philip K. Wrigley led the formation of the All-American Girls Professional Baseball League to help keep the game in the public eye. The first crack in the unwritten agreement barring blacks from white-controlled professional ball occurred in 1945: Jackie Robinson was signed by the National League's Brooklyn Dodgers and began playing for their minor league team in Montreal. In 1947, Robinson broke the major leagues' color barrier when he debuted with the Dodgers. Latin-American players, largely overlooked before, also started entering the majors in greater numbers. In 1951, two Chicago White Sox, Venezuelan-born Chico Carrasquel and black Cuban-born Minnie Miñoso, became the first Hispanic All-Stars. Integration proceeded slowly: by 1953, only six of the 16 major league teams had a black player on the roster.

==== Attendance records and the age of steroids ====
In 1975, the union's power—and players' salaries—began to increase greatly when the reserve clause was effectively struck down, leading to the free agency system. Significant work stoppages occurred in 1981 and 1994, the latter forcing the cancellation of the World Series for the first time in 90 years. Attendance had been growing steadily since the mid-1970s and in 1994, before the stoppage, the majors were setting their all-time record for per-game attendance. After play resumed in 1995, non-division-winning wild card teams became a permanent fixture of the post-season. Regular-season interleague play was introduced in 1997 and the second-highest attendance mark for a full season was set. In 2000, the National and American Leagues were dissolved as legal entities. While their identities were maintained for scheduling purposes (and the designated hitter distinction), the regulations and other functions—such as player discipline and umpire supervision—they had administered separately were consolidated under the rubric of MLB.

In 2001, Barry Bonds established the current record of 73 home runs in a single season. There had long been suspicions that the dramatic increase in power hitting was fueled in large part by the abuse of illegal steroids (as well as by the dilution of pitching talent due to expansion), but the issue only began attracting significant media attention in 2002 and there was no penalty for the use of performance-enhancing drugs before 2004. In 2007, Bonds became MLB's all-time home run leader, surpassing Hank Aaron, as total major league and minor league attendance both reached all-time highs.

=== Around the world ===
Despite having been called "America's national pastime", baseball is well-established in several other countries. As early as 1877, a professional league, the International Association, featured teams from both Canada and the United States. While baseball is widely played in Canada and many minor league teams have been based in the country, the American major leagues did not include a Canadian club until 1969, when the Montreal Expos joined the National League as an expansion team. In 1977, the expansion Toronto Blue Jays joined the American League.

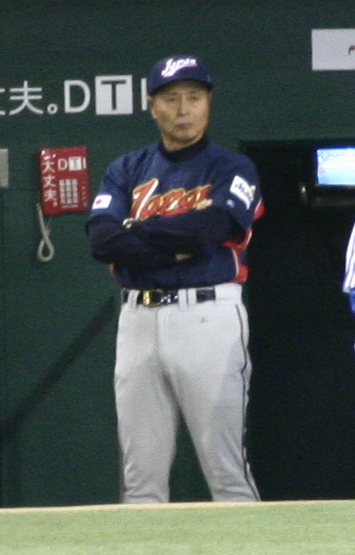
Sadaharu Oh managing the Japan national team in the 2006 World Baseball Classic. Playing for the Central League's Yomiuri Giants (1959–80), Oh set the professional world record for home runs.

In 1847, American soldiers played what may have been the first baseball game in Mexico at Parque Los Berros in Xalapa, Veracruz. The first formal baseball league outside of the United States and Canada was founded in 1878 in Cuba, which maintains a rich baseball tradition. In the UK, the English football club, Aston Villa, were the first British baseball champions winning the 1890 National League of Baseball of Great Britain. The 2025 National Champions were the London Mets.

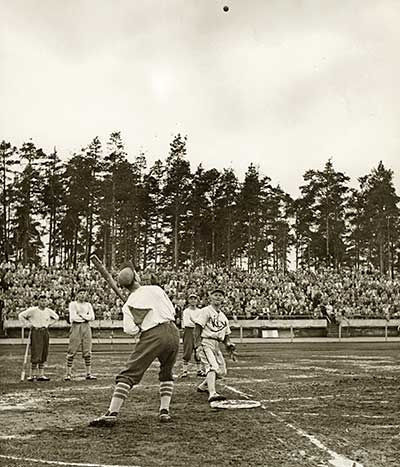
Pesäpallo, a Finnish variation of baseball, was invented by Lauri "Tahko" Pihkala in the 1920s, and after that, it has changed with the times and grown in popularity. Picture of Pesäpallo match in 1958 in Jyväskylä, Finland.

The Dominican Republic held its first islandwide championship tournament in 1912. Professional baseball tournaments and leagues began to form in other countries between the world wars, including the Netherlands (formed in 1922), Australia (1934), Japan (1936), Mexico (1937), and Puerto Rico (1938). The Japanese major leagues have long been considered the highest quality professional circuits outside of the United States. After World War II, professional leagues were founded in many Latin American countries, most prominently Venezuela (1946) and the Dominican Republic (1955). Since the early 1970s, the annual Caribbean Series has matched the championship clubs from the four leading Latin American winter leagues: the Dominican Professional Baseball League, Mexican Pacific League, Puerto Rican Professional Baseball League, and Venezuelan Professional Baseball League. In Asia, South Korea (1982), Taiwan (1990) and China (2003) all have professional leagues.

Other European countries have seen professional leagues; the most successful, other than the Dutch league, is the Italian league, founded in 1948. In 2004, Australia won a surprise silver medal at the Olympic Games. The Confédération Européene de Baseball (European Baseball Confederation), founded in 1953, organizes a number of competitions between clubs from different countries. Other competitions between national teams, such as the Baseball World Cup and the Olympic baseball tournament, were administered by the International Baseball Federation (IBAF) from its formation in 1938 until its 2013 merger with the International Softball Federation to create the current joint governing body for both sports, the World Baseball Softball Confederation (WBSC). Women's baseball is played on an organized amateur basis in numerous countries.

After being admitted to the Olympics as a medal sport beginning with the 1992 Games, baseball was dropped from the 2012 Summer Olympic Games at the 2005 International Olympic Committee meeting. It remained part of the 2008 Games. While the sport's lack of a following in much of the world was a factor, more important was MLB's reluctance to allow its players to participate during the major league season. MLB initiated the World Baseball Classic, scheduled to precede its season, partly as a replacement, high-profile international tournament. The inaugural Classic, held in March 2006, was the first tournament involving national teams to feature a significant number of MLB participants. The Baseball World Cup was discontinued after its 2011 edition in favor of an expanded World Baseball Classic.

== Distinctive elements ==
Baseball has certain attributes that set it apart from the other popular team sports in the countries where it has a following. All of these sports use a clock, play is less individual, and the variation between playing fields is not as substantial or important. The comparison between cricket and baseball demonstrates that many of baseball's distinctive elements are shared in various ways with similar sports.

=== No clock to kill ===
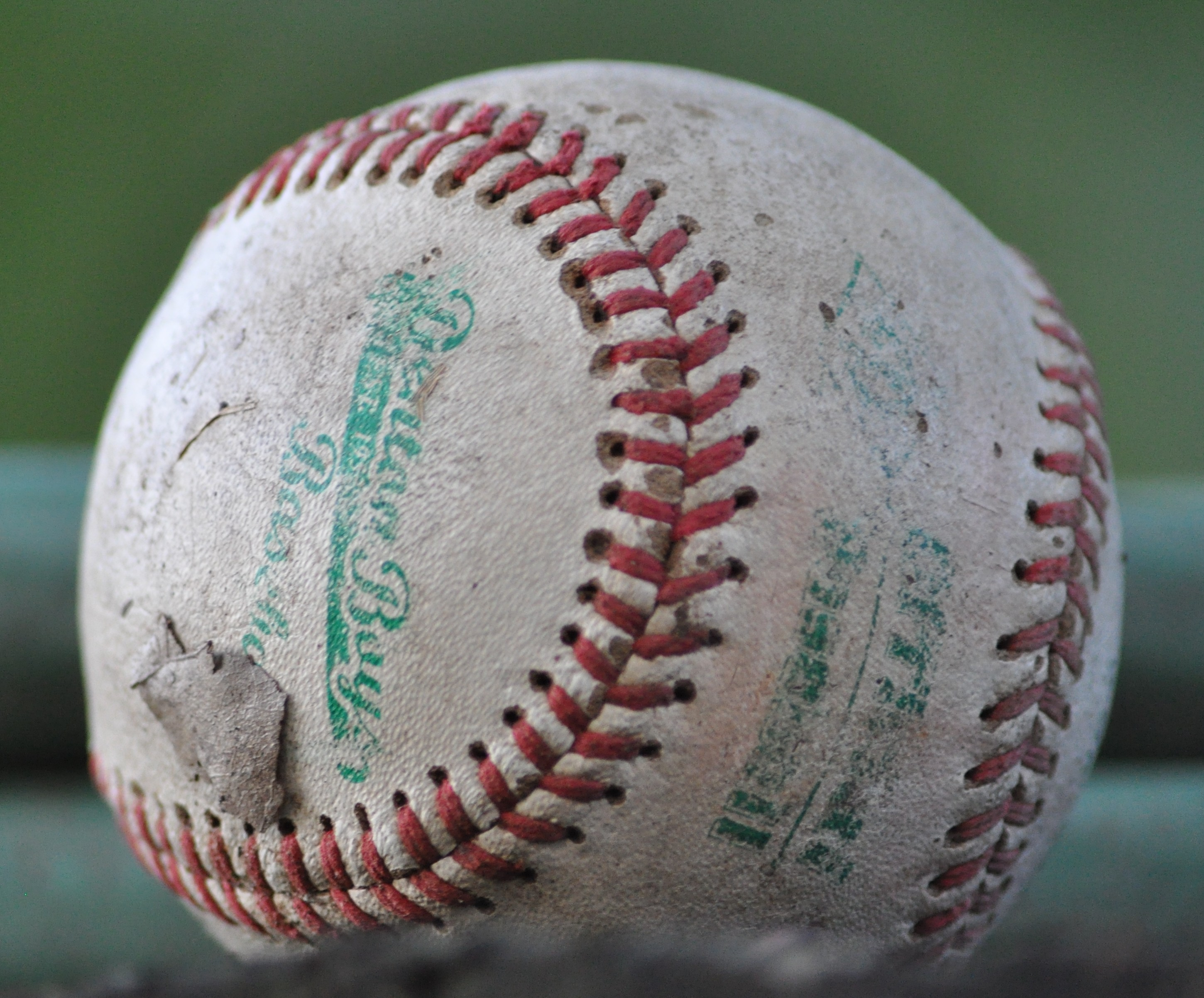
A well-worn baseball

In clock-limited sports, games often end with a team that holds the lead killing the clock rather than competing aggressively against the opposing team. In contrast, baseball has no clock, thus a team cannot win without getting the last batter out and rallies are not constrained by time. At almost any turn in any baseball game, the most advantageous strategy is some form of aggressive strategy. Whereas, in the case of multi-day Test and first-class cricket, the possibility of a draw (which occurs because of the restrictions on time, which like in baseball, originally did not exist) often encourages a team that is batting last and well behind, to bat defensively and run out the clock, giving up any faint chance at a win, to avoid an overall loss.

While nine innings has been the standard since the beginning of professional baseball, the duration of the average major league game has increased steadily through the years. At the turn of the 20th century, games typically took an hour and a half to play. In the 1920s, they averaged just less than two hours, which eventually ballooned to 2:38 in 1960. By 1997, the average American League game lasted 2:57 (National League games were about 10 minutes shorter—pitchers at the plate making for quicker outs than designated hitters). In 2004, Major League Baseball declared that its goal was an average game of 2:45. By 2014, though, the average MLB game took over three hours to complete. The lengthening of games is attributed to longer breaks between half-innings for television commercials, increased offense, more pitching changes, and a slower pace of play, with pitchers taking more time between each delivery, and batters stepping out of the box more frequently. Other leagues have experienced similar issues. In 2008, Nippon Professional Baseball took steps aimed at shortening games by 12 minutes from the preceding decade's average of 3:18.

In 2016, the average nine-inning playoff game in Major League baseball was 3 hours and 35 minutes. This was up 10 minutes from 2015 and 21 minutes from 2014. In response to the lengthening of the game, MLB decided from the 2023 season onward to institute a pitch clock rule to penalize batters and pitchers who take too much time between pitches; this had the effect of shortening 2023 regular season games by 24 minutes on average. By 2025, the average MLB game had decreased to 2 hours and 38 minutes - nearly an hour shorter than before the introduction of a pitch clock.

=== Individual focus ===
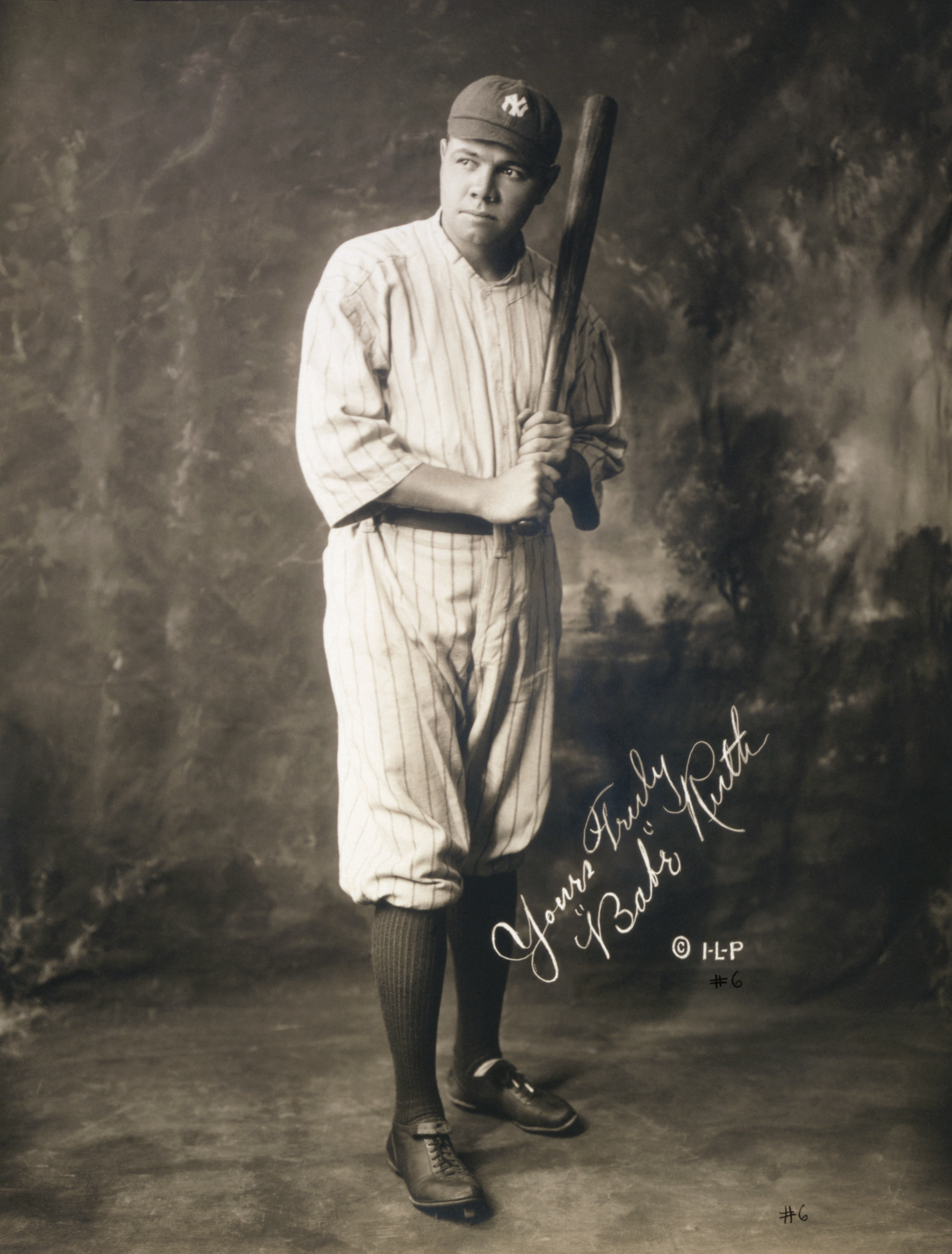
Babe Ruth in 1920, the year he joined the New York Yankees

Although baseball is a team sport, individual players are often placed under scrutiny and pressure. While rewarding, it has sometimes been described as "ruthless" due to the pressure on the individual player. In 1915, a baseball instructional manual pointed out that every single pitch, of which there are often more than two hundred in a game, involves an individual, one-on-one contest: "the pitcher and the batter in a battle of wits". Pitcher, batter, and fielder all act essentially independent of each other. While coaching staffs can signal pitcher or batter to pursue certain tactics, the execution of the play itself is a series of solitary acts. If the batter hits a line drive, the outfielder is solely responsible for deciding to try to catch it or play it on the bounce and for succeeding or failing. The statistical precision of baseball is both facilitated by this isolation and reinforces it.

Cricket is more similar to baseball than many other team sports in this regard: while the individual focus in cricket is mitigated by the importance of the batting partnership and the practicalities of tandem running, it is enhanced by the fact that a batsman may occupy the wicket for an hour or much more. There is no statistical equivalent in cricket for the fielding error and thus less emphasis on personal responsibility in this area of play.

=== Uniqueness of parks ===
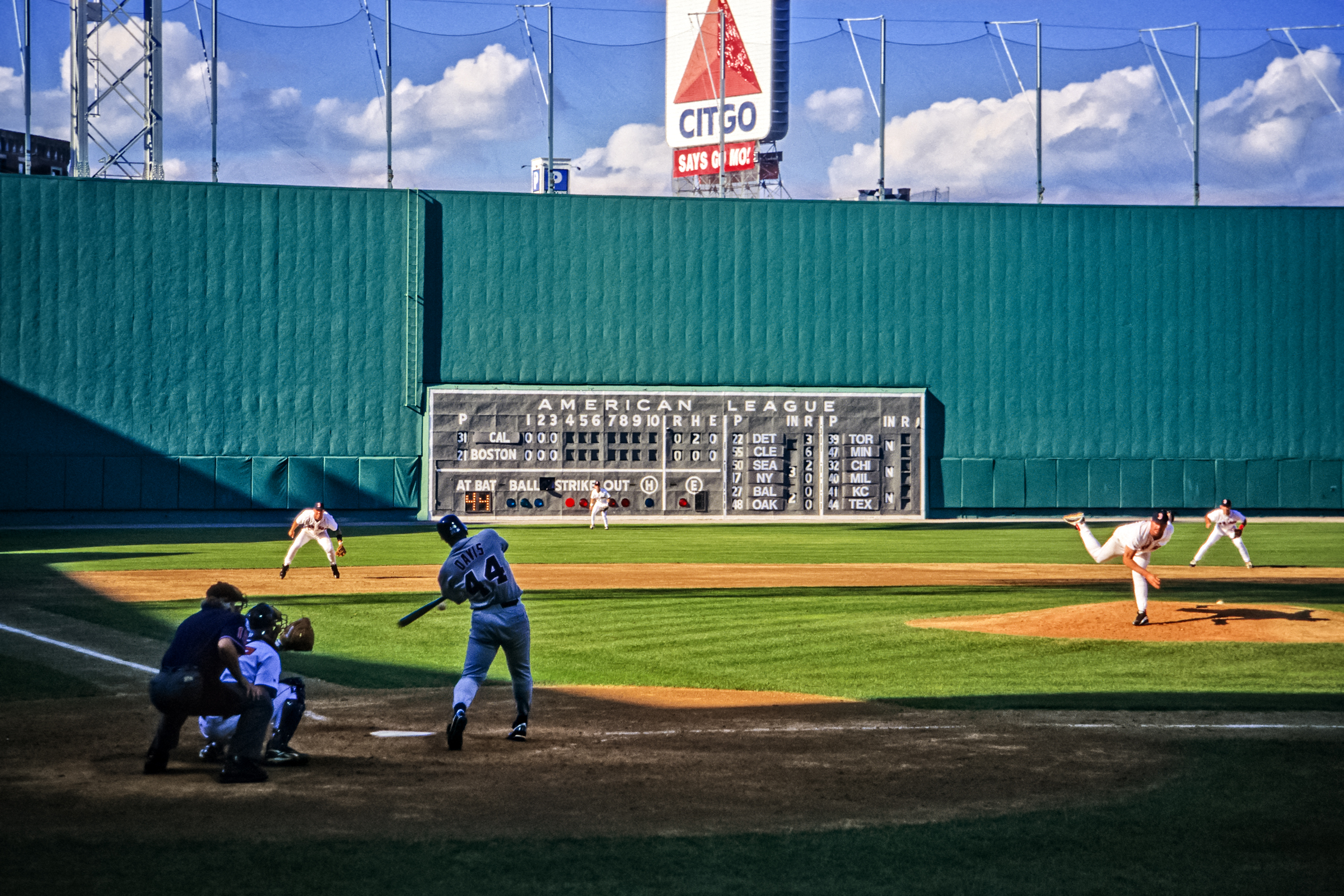
Fenway Park, home of the Boston Red Sox. The Green Monster is visible beyond the playing field.

Unlike those of most sports, baseball playing fields can vary significantly in size and shape. While the dimensions of the infield are specifically regulated, the only constraint on outfield size and shape for professional teams, following the rules of MLB and Minor League Baseball, is that fields built or remodeled since June 1, 1958, must have a minimum distance of 325 feet (99 m) from home plate to the fences in left and right field and 400 feet (122 m) to center. Major league teams often skirt even this rule. For example, at Daikin Park, which became the home of the Houston Astros in 2000, the Crawford Boxes in left field are only 315 feet (96 m) from home plate. There are no rules at all that address the height of fences or other structures at the edge of the outfield. The most famously idiosyncratic outfield boundary is the left-field wall at Boston's Fenway Park, in use since 1912: the Green Monster is 310 feet (94 m) from home plate down the line and 37 feet (11 m) tall.

Similarly, there are no regulations at all concerning the dimensions of foul territory. Thus a foul fly ball may be entirely out of play in a park with little space between the foul lines and the stands, but a foulout in a park with more expansive foul ground. A fence in foul territory that is close to the outfield line will tend to direct balls that strike it back toward the fielders, while one that is farther away may actually prompt more collisions, as outfielders run full speed to field balls deep in the corner. These variations can make the difference between a double and a triple or inside-the-park home run. The surface of the field is also unregulated. While the adjacent image shows a traditional field surfacing arrangement (and the one used by virtually all MLB teams with naturally surfaced fields), teams are free to decide what areas will be grassed or bare. Some fields—including several in MLB—use artificial turf. Surface variations can have a significant effect on how ground balls behave and are fielded as well as on baserunning. Similarly, the presence of a roof (seven major league teams play in stadiums with permanent or retractable roofs) can greatly affect how fly balls are played. While football and soccer players deal with similar variations of field surface and stadium covering, the size and shape of their fields are much more standardized. The area out-of-bounds on a football or soccer field does not affect play the way foul territory in baseball does, so variations in that regard are largely insignificant.

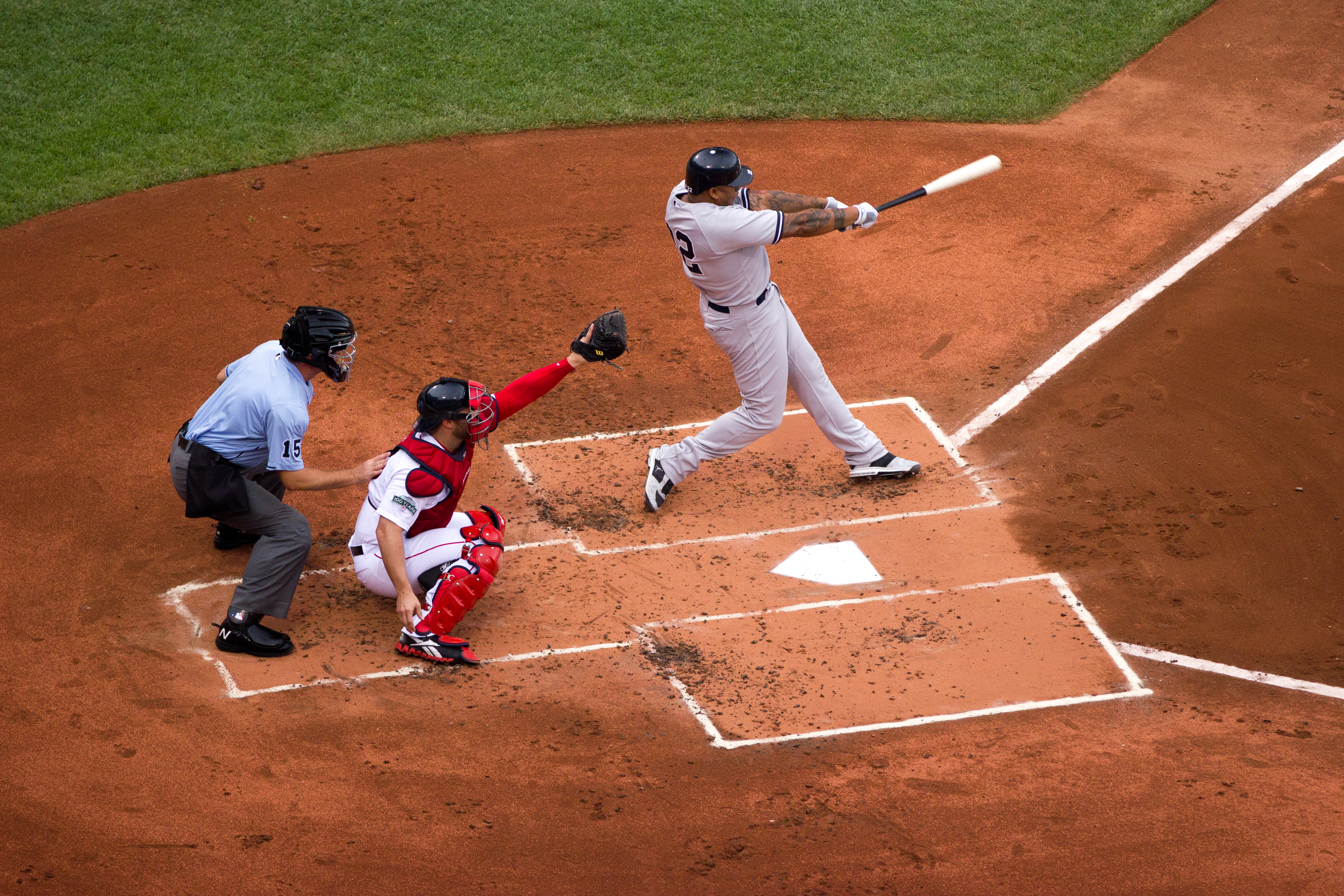
A New York Yankees batter (Andruw Jones) and a Boston Red Sox catcher at Fenway Park

These physical variations create a distinctive set of playing conditions at each ballpark. Other local factors, such as altitude and climate, can also significantly affect play. A given stadium may acquire a reputation as a pitcher's park or a hitter's park, if one or the other discipline notably benefits from its unique mix of elements. The most exceptional park in this regard is Coors Field, home of the Colorado Rockies. Its high altitude—5,282 feet (1,610 m) above sea level—is partly responsible for giving it the strongest hitter's park effect in the major leagues due to the low air pressure. Wrigley Field, home of the Chicago Cubs, is known for its fickle disposition: a pitcher's park when the strong winds off Lake Michigan are blowing in, it becomes more of a hitter's park when they are blowing out. The absence of a standardized field affects not only how particular games play out, but the nature of team rosters and players' statistical records. For example, hitting a fly ball 330 feet (100 m) into right field might result in an easy catch on the warning track at one park, and a home run at another. A team that plays in a park with a relatively short right field, such as the New York Yankees, will tend to stock its roster with left-handed pull hitters, who can best exploit it. On the individual level, a player who spends most of his career with a team that plays in a hitter's park will gain an advantage in batting statistics over time—even more so if his talents are especially suited to the park.

== Statistics ==
Organized baseball lends itself to statistics to a greater degree than many other sports. Each play is discrete and has a relatively small number of possible outcomes. In the late 19th century, a former cricket player, English-born Henry Chadwick of Brooklyn, was responsible for the "development of the box score, tabular standings, the annual baseball guide, the batting average, and most of the common statistics and tables used to describe baseball." The statistical record is so central to the game's "historical essence" that Chadwick came to be known as Father Baseball. In the 1920s, American newspapers began devoting more and more attention to baseball statistics, initiating what journalist and historian Alan Schwarz describes as a "tectonic shift in sports, as intrigue that once focused mostly on teams began to go to individual players and their statistics lines."

The Official Baseball Rules administered by MLB require the official scorer to categorize each baseball play unambiguously. The rules provide detailed criteria to promote consistency. The score report is the official basis for both the box score of the game and the relevant statistical records. General managers, managers, and baseball scouts use statistics to evaluate players and make strategic decisions.

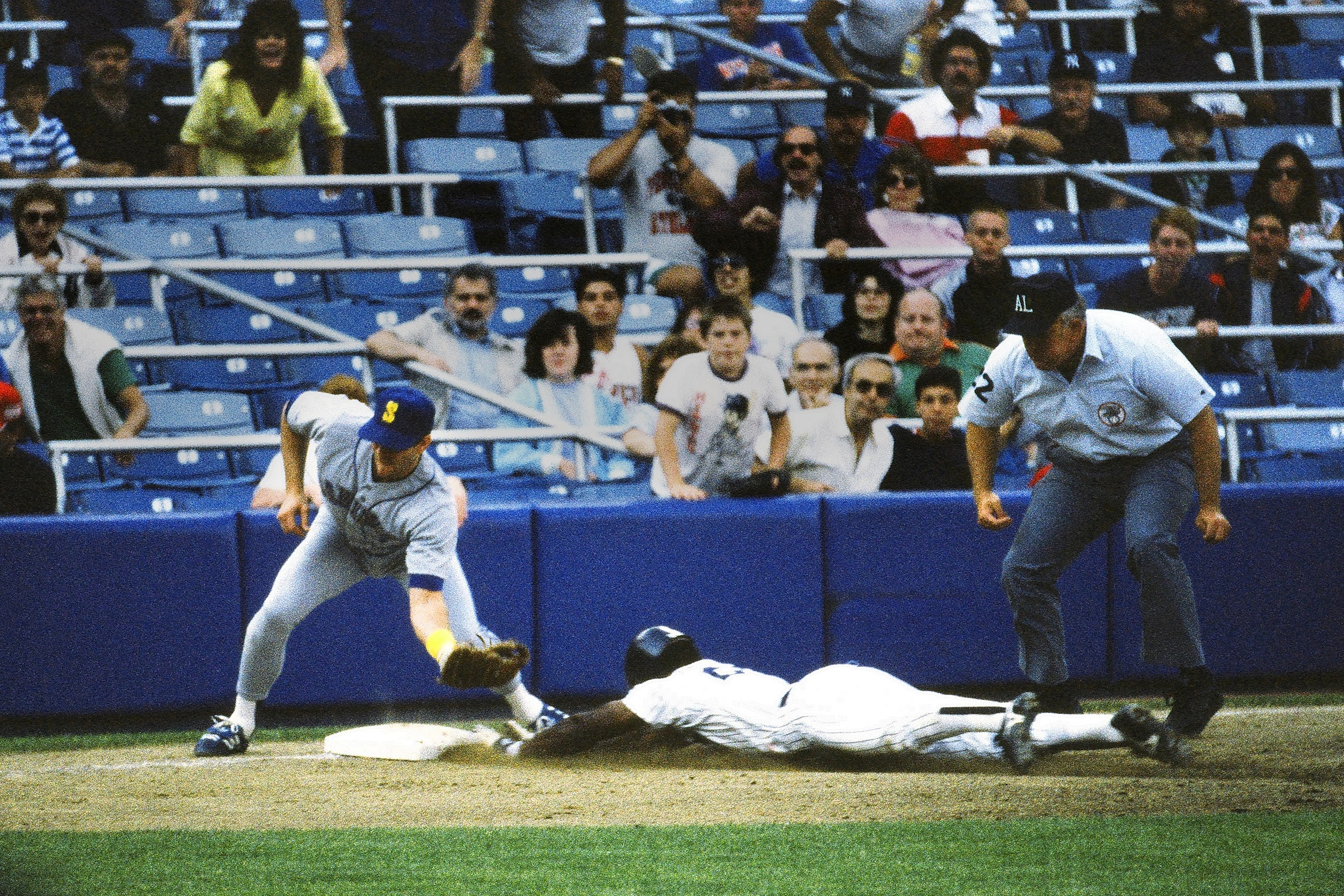
Rickey Henderson—the major leagues' all-time leader in runs and stolen bases—stealing third base in a 1988 game

Certain traditional statistics are familiar to most baseball fans. The basic batting statistics include:

- At bats: plate appearances, excluding walks and hit by pitches—where the batter's ability is not fully tested—and sacrifices and sacrifice flies—where the batter intentionally makes an out in order to advance one or more baserunners
- Hits: times a base is reached safely, because of a batted, fair ball without a fielding error or fielder's choice
- Runs: times circling the bases and reaching home safely
- Runs batted in (RBIs): number of runners who scored due to a batter's action (including the batter, in the case of a home run), except when batter grounded into double play or reached on an error
- Home runs: hits on which the batter successfully touched all four bases, without the contribution of a fielding error
- Batting average: hits divided by at bats—the traditional measure of batting ability

The basic baserunning statistics include:

- Stolen bases: times advancing to the next base entirely due to the runner's own efforts, generally while the pitcher is preparing to deliver or delivering the ball
- Caught stealing: times tagged out while attempting to steal a base

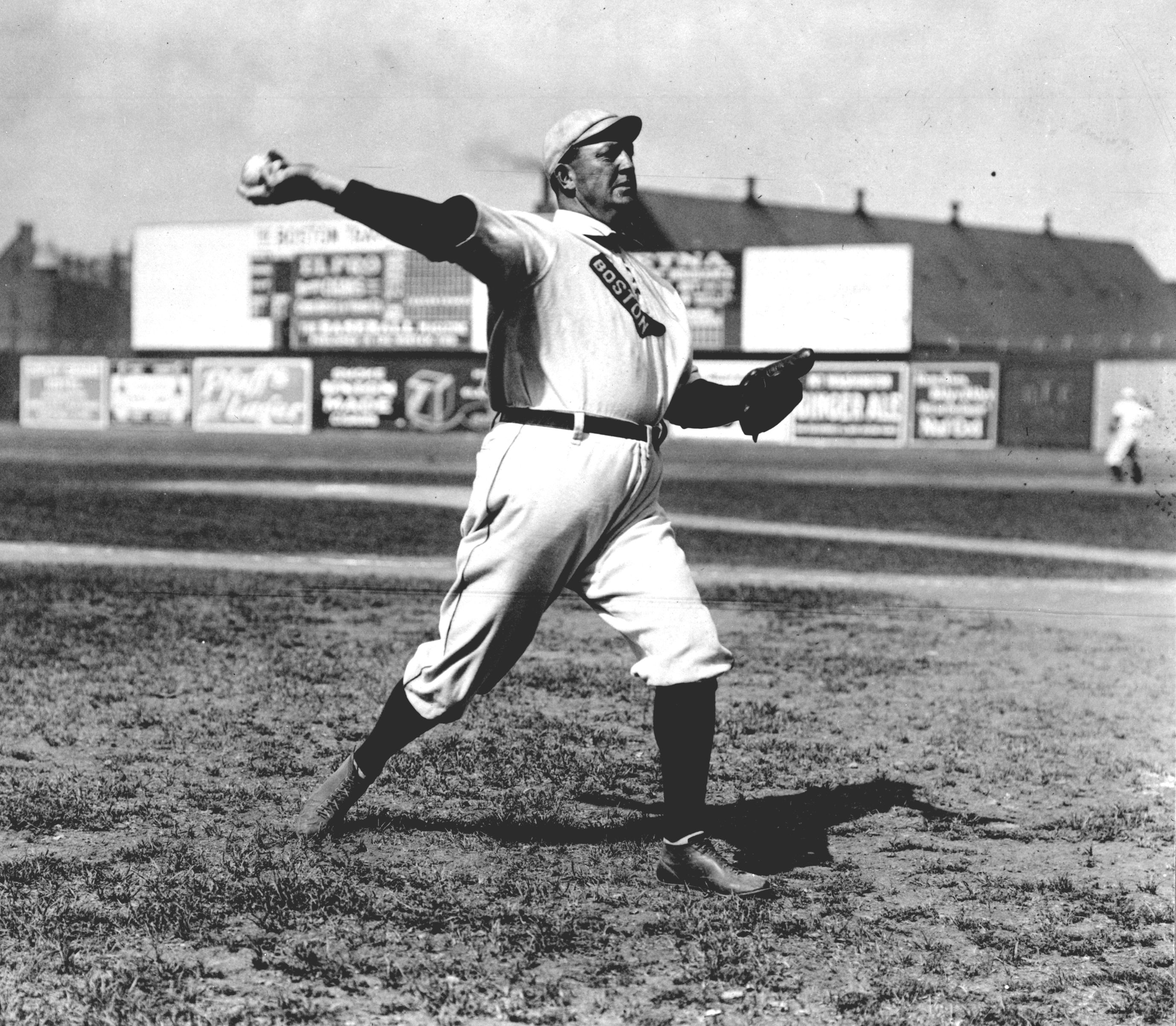
Cy Young—the holder of many major league career marks, including wins and innings pitched, as well as losses—in 1908. MLB's annual awards for the best pitcher in each league are named for Young.

The basic pitching statistics include:

- Wins: credited to pitcher on winning team who last pitched before the team took a lead that it never relinquished (a starting pitcher must pitch at least five innings to qualify for a win)
- Losses: charged to pitcher on losing team who was pitching when the opposing team took a lead that it never relinquished
- Saves: games where the pitcher enters a game led by the pitcher's team, finishes the game without surrendering the lead, is not the winning pitcher, and either (a) the lead was three runs or less when the pitcher entered the game; (b) the potential tying run was on base, at bat, or on deck; or (c) the pitcher pitched three or more innings
- Innings pitched: outs recorded while pitching divided by three (partial innings are conventionally recorded as, e.g., "5.2" or "7.1", the last digit actually representing thirds, not tenths, of an inning)
- Strikeouts: times pitching three strikes to a batter
- Winning percentage: wins divided by decisions (wins plus losses)
- Earned run average (ERA): runs allowed, excluding those resulting from fielding errors, per nine innings pitched

The basic fielding statistics include:

- Putouts: times the fielder catches a fly ball, tags or forces out a runner, or otherwise directly effects an out
- Assists: times a putout by another fielder was recorded following the fielder touching the ball
- Errors: times the fielder fails to make a play that should have been made with common effort, and the batting team benefits as a result
- Total chances: putouts plus assists plus errors
- Fielding average: successful chances (putouts plus assists) divided by total chances

Among the many other statistics that are kept are those collectively known as situational statistics. For example, statistics can indicate which specific pitchers a certain batter performs best against. If a given situation statistically favors a certain batter, the manager of the fielding team may be more likely to change pitchers or have the pitcher intentionally walk the batter in order to face one who is less likely to succeed.

=== Sabermetrics ===
Sabermetrics is the field of baseball statistical study and the development of new statistics and analytical tools. Such new statistics are also called sabermetrics. The term was coined around 1980 by one of the field's leading proponents, Bill James, and derives from the Society for American Baseball Research (SABR).

The growing popularity of sabermetrics since the early 1980s has brought more attention to two batting statistics that sabermetricians argue are much better gauges of a batter's skill than batting average:

- On-base percentage (OBP) measures a batter's ability to get on base. It is calculated by taking the sum of the batter's successes in getting on base (hits plus walks plus hit by pitches) and dividing that by the batter's total plate appearances (at bats plus walks plus hit by pitches plus sacrifice flies), except for sacrifice bunts.
- Slugging percentage (SLG) measures a batter's ability to hit for power. It is calculated by taking the batter's total bases (one per each single, two per double, three per triple, and four per home run) and dividing that by the batter's at bats.

Some of the new statistics devised by sabermetricians have gained wide use:

- On-base plus slugging (OPS) measures a batter's overall ability. It is calculated by adding the batter's on-base percentage and slugging percentage.
- Walks plus hits per inning pitched (WHIP) measures a pitcher's ability at preventing hitters from reaching base. It is calculated by adding the number of walks and hits a pitcher surrendered, then dividing by the number of innings pitched.
- Wins Above Replacement (WAR) measures number of additional wins his team has achieved above the number of expected team wins if that player were substituted with a replacement-level player.

== Popularity and cultural impact ==
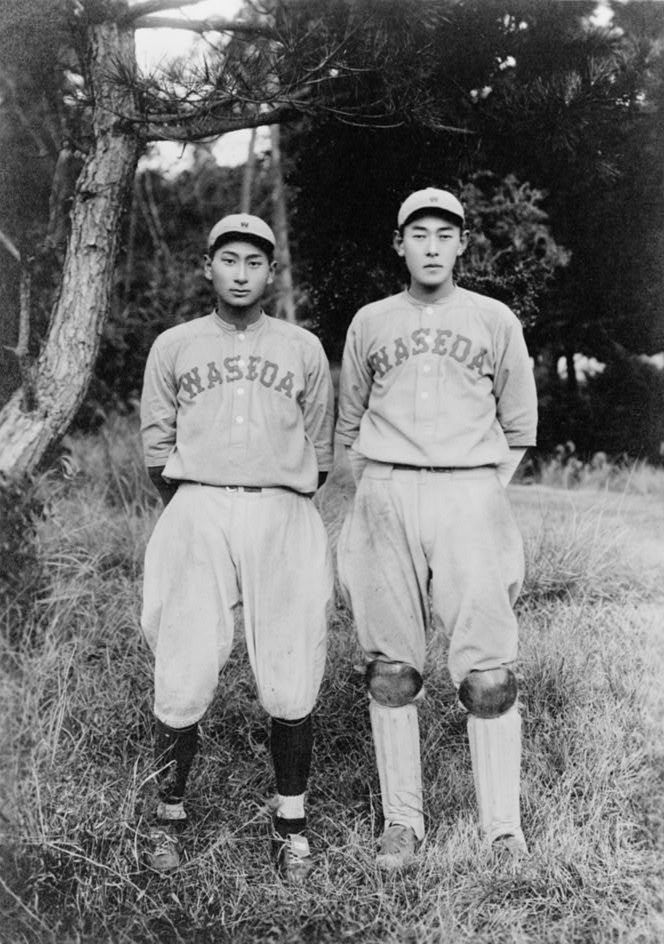
Two players on the baseball team of Tokyo, Japan's Waseda University in 1921

Writing in 1919, philosopher Morris Raphael Cohen described baseball as the national religion of the US. In the words of sports columnist Jayson Stark, baseball has long been "a unique paragon of American culture"—a status he sees as devastated by the steroid abuse scandal. Baseball has an important place in other national cultures as well: Scholar Peter Bjarkman describes "how deeply the sport is ingrained in the history and culture of a nation such as Cuba, [and] how thoroughly it was radically reshaped and nativized in Japan."

=== Western Hemisphere ===
American influence in the Western Hemisphere has meant that baseball grew significantly in the region.

==== In the United States ====
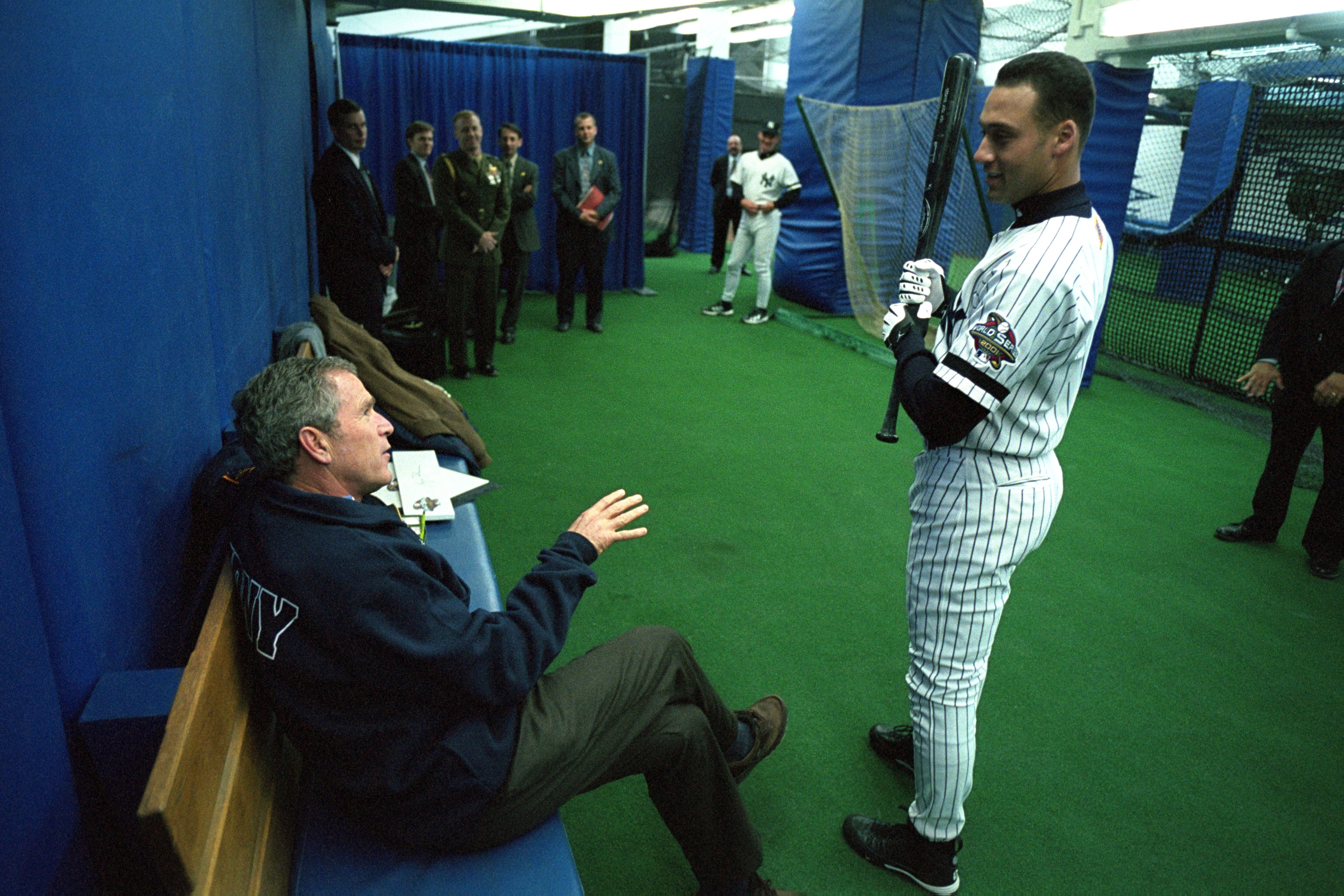
President George W. Bush taking advice before throwing the first pitch of World Series game 3, weeks after 9/11

The major league game in the United States was originally targeted toward a middle-class, white-collar audience: relative to other spectator pastimes, the National League's set ticket price of 50 cents in 1876 was high, while the location of playing fields outside the inner city and the workweek daytime scheduling of games were also obstacles to a blue-collar audience. A century later, the situation was very different. With the rise in popularity of other team sports with much higher average ticket prices—football, basketball, and hockey—professional baseball had become among the most popular blue-collar-oriented American spectator sports.

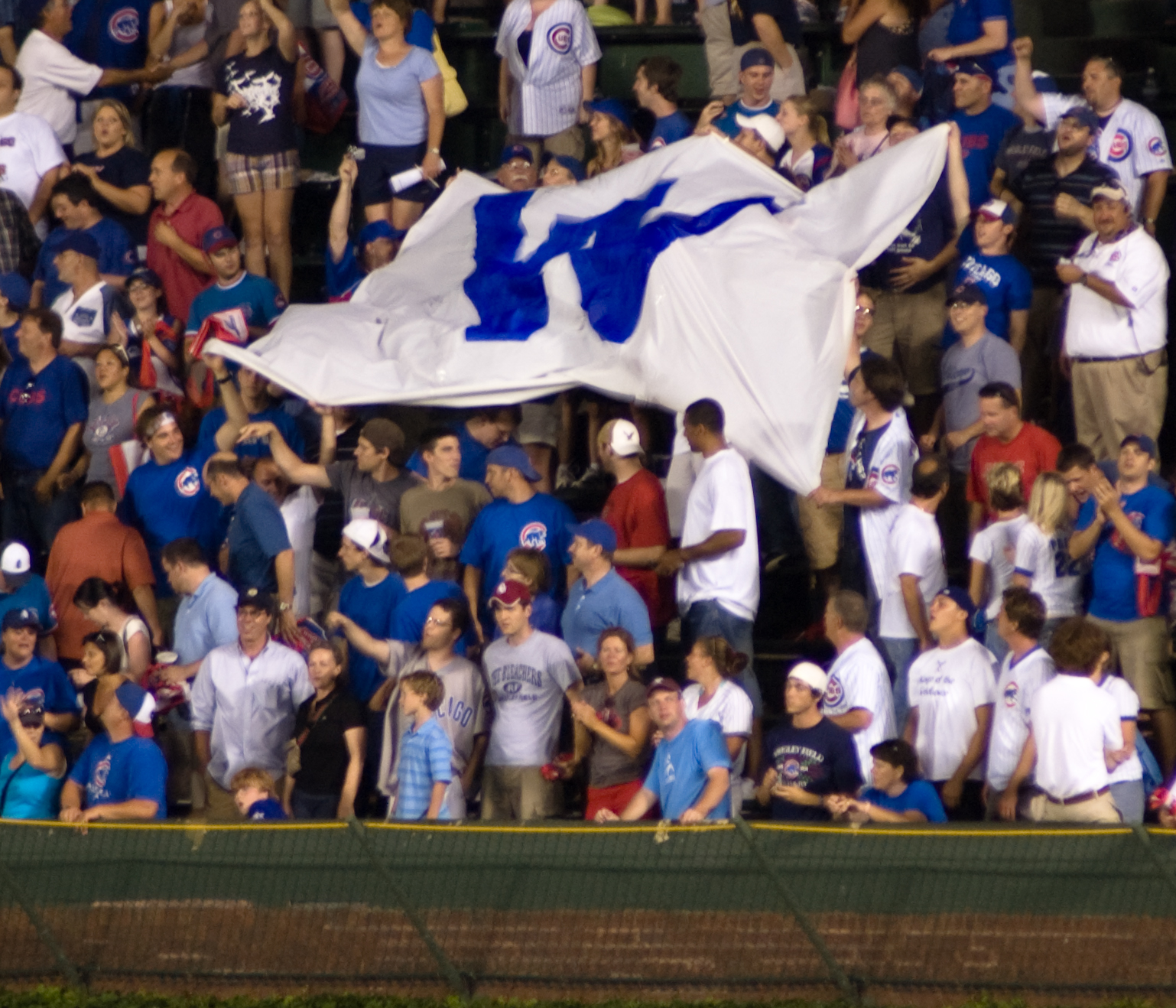
Chicago Cubs Fans celebrate with Cubs Win Flag

Overall, baseball has a large following in the United States; a 2006 poll found that nearly half of Americans are fans. This led to baseball being granted the title of "America's favorite pastime" by many American baseball fans. As historians and scholars now speculate, baseball is a metaphor of the American way of life In the late 1900s and early 2000s, baseball's position compared to football in the United States moved in contradictory directions. In 2008, MLB set a revenue record of $6.5 billion, matching the NFL's revenue for the first time in decades. A new MLB revenue record of more than $10 billion was set in 2017. On the other hand, the percentage of American sports fans polled who named baseball as their favorite sport was 9%, compared to pro football at 37%. In 1985, the respective figures were pro football 24%, baseball 23%. Because there are so many more major league games played, there is no comparison in overall attendance. In 2008, total attendance at major league games was the second-highest in history: 78.6 million, 0.7% off the record set the previous year. The following year, amid the U.S. recession, attendance fell by 6.6% to 73.4 million. Eight years later, it dropped under 73 million. Attendance at games held under the Minor League Baseball umbrella set a record in 2008, with 43.3 million. While MLB games have not drawn the same national TV viewership as football games, MLB games are dominant in teams' local markets and regularly lead all programs in primetime in their markets during the summer. After multiple years of declines since 2017, baseball attendance has grown slightly in recent years. In 2024, attendance was 71.3 million, the highest since 2017.

==== Latin America ====
Baseball is very popular in Venezuela; in 2011, 95% of people surveyed claimed it to be the national sport. In Nicaragua and Panama, baseball is also considered the national sport. While soccer is still more popular, baseball is a fast-growing sport in Mexico. In 2024, top Mexican League baseball teams outdraw some Liga MX teams in attendance. Baseball also is somewhat popular in Colombia, though secondary to soccer, especially in coastal areas such as Barranquilla and Cartagena which are near the Caribbean. In recent years, baseball has grown in popularity in Colombia, especially in the capital of Bogotá, due an increase of Venezuelan immigrants. In Brazil, baseball fan popularity has grown in the last few years, thanks to MLB broadcasts in Brazilian ESPN and the historic silver medal in 2023 Pan-American games. However, it still lags behind basketball and American football in the list of most played sports in Brazil. Baseball has also grown in popularity in Argentina and Peru in recent years due to Venezuelan immigrants. Costa Rica has also seen a growth in the popularity of baseball. Since 1987, baseballs have exclusively been made in the Costa Rican town of Turrialba. Baseball is also played in Honduras. In recent years, Major leaguer Mauricio Dubón has made efforts to increase support for the sport in the country.

The sport's overall popularity in Latin America has assisted in integrating Latin American migrants to the United States.

==== Caribbean ====
Since the early 1980s, the Dominican Republic, in particular the city of San Pedro de Macorís, has been the major leagues' primary source of foreign talent. In 2017, 83 of the 868 players on MLB Opening Day rosters (and disabled lists) were from the country. Among other Caribbean countries and territories, a combined 97 MLB players were born in Venezuela, Cuba, and Puerto Rico. Hall-of-Famer Roberto Clemente remains one of the greatest national heroes in Puerto Rico's history. While baseball has long been the island's primary athletic pastime, its once well-attended professional winter league has declined in popularity since 1990, when young Puerto Rican players began to be included in the major leagues' annual first-year player draft. In Cuba, where baseball is by every reckoning the national sport, the national team overshadows the city and provincial teams that play in the top-level domestic leagues. Baseball is also one of the most popular sports of Aruba and Curaçao, and a growing sport in The Bahamas and the US Virgin Islands.

=== Asia ===
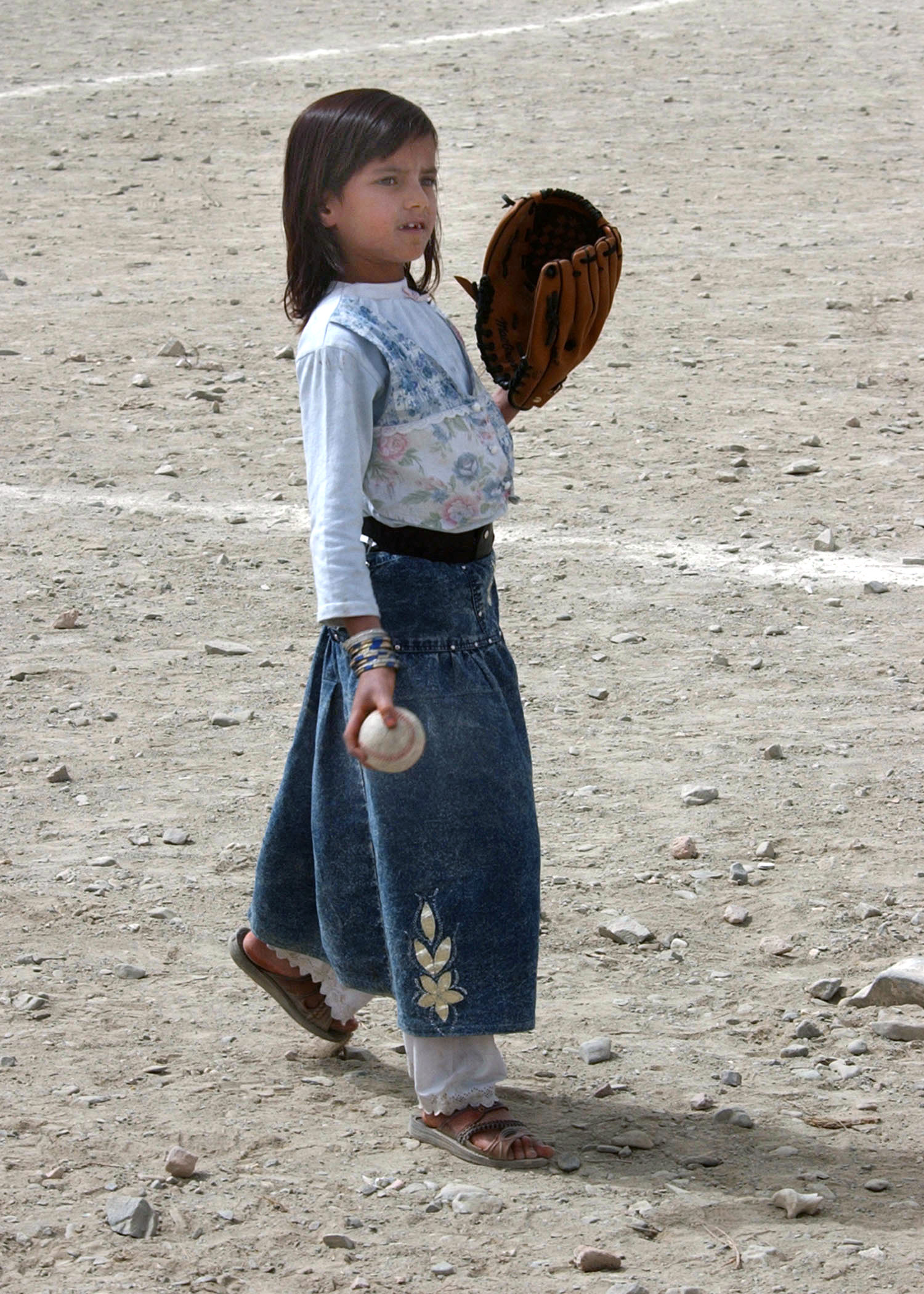
An Afghan girl playing baseball in August 2002

In East Asia, baseball is among the most popular sports in Japan, Taiwan and South Korea. In Japan, where baseball is inarguably the leading spectator team sport, combined revenue for the twelve teams in Nippon Professional Baseball (NPB), the body that oversees both the Central and Pacific Leagues, was estimated at $1 billion in 2007. Total NPB attendance for the year was approximately 20 million. While in the preceding two decades, MLB attendance grew by 50 percent and revenue nearly tripled, the comparable NPB figures were stagnant. There are concerns that MLB's growing interest in acquiring star Japanese players will hurt the game in their home country. Revenue figures are not released for the country's amateur system. Similarly, according to one official pronouncement, the sport's governing authority "has never taken into account attendance ... because its greatest interest has always been the development of athletes". In Taiwan, baseball is one of the most widely spectated sports, in TV and person.

Baseball has grown significantly in China in recent years, with MLB estimating in 2019 that there are 21 million active fans in the country.

Baseball was considered a national pastime in the Philippines in the 1960s and 70s, but the sport has since declined in popularity. Since 2005, there have been efforts to revitalize the sport in the country.

Baseball saw a surge in popularity in Thailand following the countries' silver medal in baseball in the 2025 SEA Games, which were hosted in Thailand.

=== Europe ===
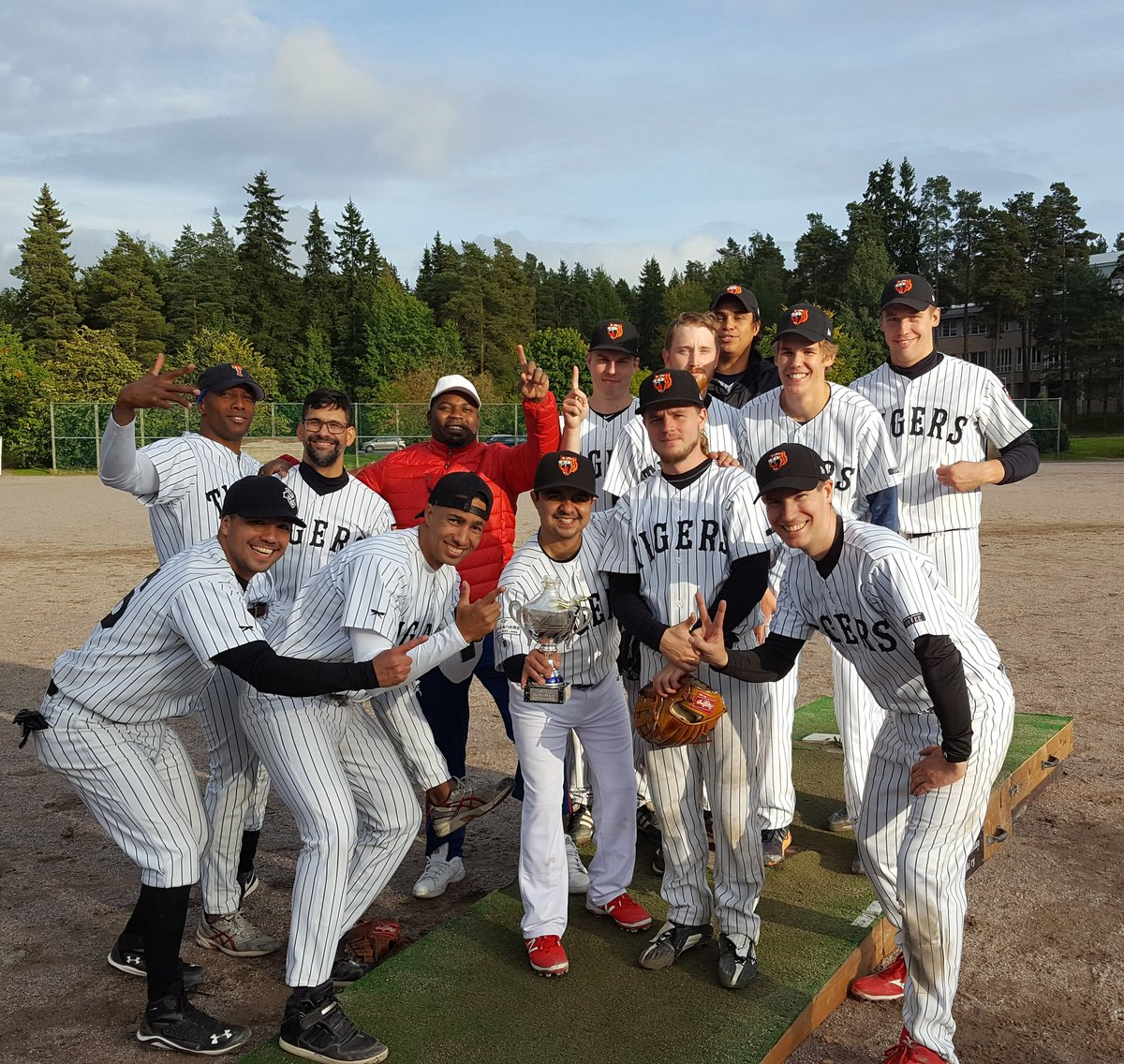
The Tampere Tigers celebrating the 2017 title in Turku, Finland

Baseball is generally a niche sport in Europe. However, baseball is somewhat popular in the Netherlands, where it is known as honkbal, thanks to influence from the United States after World War II and the Kingdoms control over Aruba and Curaçao where it is the most popular sport. Baseball is also somewhat popular in portions of Italy, especially in the town of Nettuno, due to influence from American soldiers after World War II. Baseball has grown in recent years in the Czech Republic, due in part to the Czech teams' success in the 2023 World Baseball Classic.

=== Oceania ===
Baseball is one of the most popular sports in Palau and Guam. In Australia, baseball is a niche sport but the country does have a professional league. Because the league is played in winter for the western hemisphere, it attracts American and Korean professional players looking to play winter league baseball. In 2026, there were more than 30 Australians playing college baseball in the United States compared to six in 2020. Baseball is also a growing sport in New Zealand. In Auckland, the cities' 12-and-under competition grew from five teams to nine teams from 2023 to 2026.

=== Africa ===
Baseball is a minor sport in Africa but is most popular in South Africa and Uganda, with growing programs in Zimbabwe, Ghana, Kenya, Tanzania, and Nigeria.

The Dodgers operate a large baseball academy in Mpigi, Uganda, and there are also baseball programs in Luwero, Uganda. There is also a Africa Baseball Academy in Nairobi, Nigeria. Baseball was popular in South Africa prior to World War 2 but popularity has since waned. There are still teams and attempts to raise the popularity of baseball in the country, including the introduction of Baseball5. There is a growing baseball program in South Sudan, which has resulted in professional contracts. The Japan-Africa Baseball & Softball Foundation has created Koshien high school baseball tournaments in Tanzania, Ghana and Kenya, which Tanzania being the most successful. There are further plans for similar tournaments in Nigeria, South Sudan, Benin, Cameroon and Zambia.

=== Among children ===
As of 2024, Little League Baseball oversees leagues with 2 million participants in more than 80 countries. The number of players has fallen since the 1990s, when 3 million children took part in Little League Baseball annually. Babe Ruth League teams have over 1 million participants. According to the president of the International Baseball Federation in 2009, between 300,000 and 500,000 women and girls play baseball around the world, including Little League and the introductory game of Tee Ball.

A varsity baseball team is an established part of physical education departments at most high schools and colleges in the United States. In 2015, nearly half a million high schoolers and over 34,000 collegians played on their schools' baseball teams. By early in the 20th century, intercollegiate baseball was Japan's leading sport. Today, high school baseball in particular is immensely popular there. The final rounds of the two annual tournaments—the National High School Baseball Invitational Tournament in the spring, and the even more important National High School Baseball Championship in the summer—are broadcast around the country. The tournaments are known, respectively, as Spring Koshien and Summer Koshien after the 55,000-capacity stadium where they are played. In Cuba, baseball is a mandatory part of the state system of physical education, which begins at age six. Talented children as young as seven are sent to special district schools for more intensive training—the first step on a ladder whose acme is the national baseball team.

=== In popular culture ===
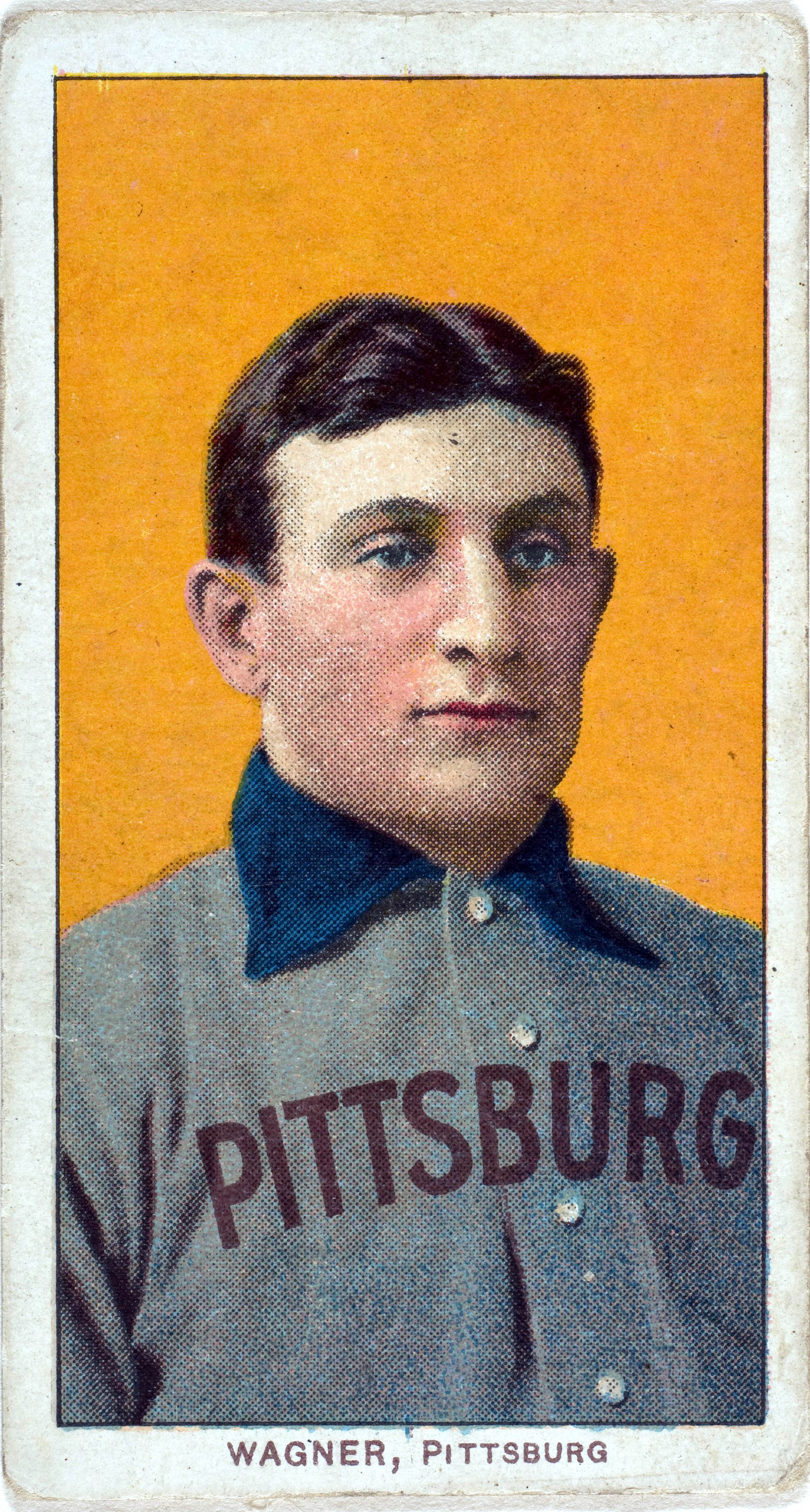
The American Tobacco Company's line of baseball cards featured shortstop Honus Wagner of the Pittsburgh Pirates from 1909 to 1911. In 2007, the card shown here sold for $2.8 million.

Baseball has had a broad impact on popular culture, both in the United States and elsewhere. Dozens of English-language idioms have been derived from baseball; in particular, the game is the source of a number of widely used sexual euphemisms. The first networked radio broadcasts in North America were of the 1922 World Series: famed sportswriter Grantland Rice announced play-by-play from New York City's Polo Grounds on WJZ–Newark, New Jersey, which was connected by wire to WGY–Schenectady, New York, and WBZ–Springfield, Massachusetts. The baseball cap has become a ubiquitous fashion item not only in the United States and Japan, but also in countries where the sport itself is not particularly popular, such as the United Kingdom.

Baseball has inspired many works of art and entertainment. One of the first major examples, Ernest Thayer's poem "Casey at the Bat", appeared in 1888; a wry description of the failure of a star player in what would now be called a "clutch situation", the poem became the source of vaudeville and other staged performances, audio recordings, film adaptations, and an opera, as well as a host of sequels and parodies in various media. There have been many baseball movies, including the Academy Award–winning The Pride of the Yankees (1942) and the Oscar nominees The Natural (1984) and Field of Dreams (1989). The American Film Institute's selection of the ten best sports movies includes The Pride of the Yankees at number 3 and Bull Durham (1988) at number 5. Baseball has provided thematic material for hits on both stage—the Adler–Ross musical Damn Yankees—and record—George J. Gaskin's "Slide, Kelly, Slide", Simon and Garfunkel's "Mrs. Robinson", and John Fogerty's "Centerfield". The baseball-inspired comedic sketch "Who's on First?", popularized by Abbott and Costello in 1938, quickly became famous; six decades later, Time named it the best comedy routine of the 20th century.

Literary works connected to the game include the short fiction of Ring Lardner and novels such as Bernard Malamud's The Natural (the source for the movie), Robert Coover's The Universal Baseball Association, Inc., J. Henry Waugh, Prop., John Grisham's Calico Joe and W. P. Kinsella's Shoeless Joe (the source for Field of Dreams). Baseball's literary canon also includes the beat reportage of Damon Runyon; the columns of Grantland Rice, Red Smith, Dick Young, and Peter Gammons; and the essays of Roger Angell. Among the celebrated nonfiction books in the field are Lawrence S. Ritter's The Glory of Their Times, Roger Kahn's The Boys of Summer, and Michael Lewis's Moneyball. The 1970 publication of major league pitcher Jim Bouton's tell-all chronicle Ball Four is considered a turning point in the reporting of professional sports.

Baseball has also inspired the creation of new cultural forms. Baseball cards were introduced in the late 19th century as trade cards. A typical example featured an image of a baseball player on one side and advertising for a business on the other. In the early 1900s they were produced widely as promotional items by tobacco and confectionery companies. The 1930s saw the popularization of the modern style of baseball card, with a player photograph accompanied on the rear by statistics and biographical data. Baseball cards—many of which are now prized collectibles—are the source of the much broader trading card industry, involving similar products for different sports and non-sports-related fields.

Modern fantasy sports began in 1980 with the invention of Rotisserie League Baseball by New York writer Daniel Okrent and several friends. Participants in a Rotisserie league draft notional teams from the list of active MLB players and play out an entire imaginary season with game outcomes based on the players' latest real-world statistics. Rotisserie-style play quickly became a phenomenon. Now known more generically as fantasy baseball, it has inspired similar games based on an array of different sports. The field boomed with increasing Internet access and new fantasy sports-related websites. By 2008, 29.9 million people in the United States and Canada were playing fantasy sports, spending $800 million on the hobby. The burgeoning popularity of fantasy baseball is also credited with the increasing attention paid to sabermetrics—first among fans, only later among baseball professionals.

=== Derivative games ===
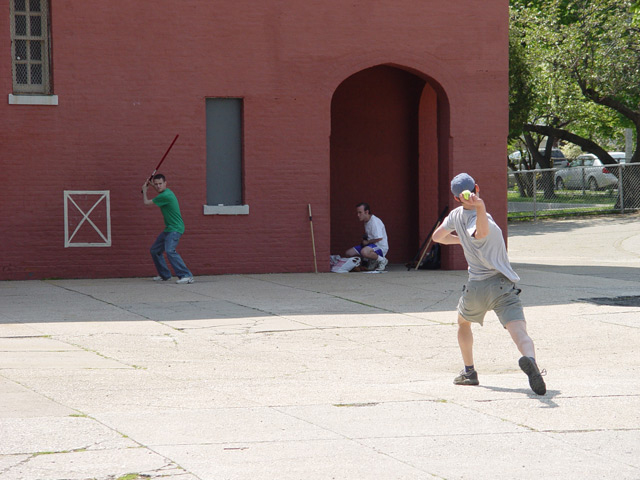
Stickball is a common street variant of baseball which often features impromptu adaptations. (Note the painted strike zone on the wall behind the batter.)

Informal variations of baseball have popped up over time, with games like corkball reflecting local traditions and allowing the game to be played in diverse environments. Two variations of baseball, softball and Baseball5, are internationally governed alongside baseball by the World Baseball Softball Confederation.

==== British baseball ====
American professional baseball teams toured Britain in 1874 and 1889, and had a great effect on similar sports in Britain. In Wales and Merseyside, a strong community game had already developed with skills and plays more in keeping with the American game and the Welsh began to informally adopt the name "baseball" (Pêl Fas), to reflect the American style. By the 1890s, calls were made to follow the success of other working class sports (like Rugby in Wales and Soccer in Merseyside) and adopt a distinct set of rules and bureaucracy. During the 1892 season rules for the game of "baseball" were agreed and the game was officially codified.

==== Finnish baseball ====
Finnish baseball, also known as pesäpallo, is a combination of traditional ball-batting team games and North American baseball, invented by Lauri "Tahko" Pihkala in the 1920s. The basic idea of pesäpallo is similar to that of baseball: the offense tries to score by hitting the ball successfully and running through the bases, while the defense tries to put the batter and runners out. One of the most important differences between pesäpallo and baseball is that the ball is pitched vertically, which makes hitting the ball, as well as controlling the power and direction of the hit, much easier. This gives the offensive game more variety, speed, and tactical aspects compared to baseball.

== See also ==
- Baseball awards – Trophy or other recognition given to a baseball player or team
- Baseball clothing and equipment
- List of baseball films
- List of organized baseball leagues
- Women in baseball

=== Related sports ===
- Brännboll – Scandinavian bat-and-ball game
- Comparison of baseball and cricket
- Comparison of baseball and softball
- Lapta (game) – Russian bat-and-ball game
- Oină – Romanian bat-and-ball game
- Snow baseball – Game with similar rules played in India during winters
- Stickball – Street game
- Stoop ball – Game played with a rubber ball
- Tee-ball – Game with similar rules where there is no pitcher and the ball sits on top of a tee
- Vitilla – Variation of stickball played in the Dominican Republic
- Wiffle ball – Variation of baseball using a plastic bat and ball

== General and cited sources ==
- Bjarkman, Peter C. (2004). Diamonds Around the Globe: The Encyclopedia of International Baseball. Greenwood. ISBN 978-0-313-32268-6. OCLC 58806121.
- Block, David (2005). Baseball Before We Knew It: A Search for the Roots of the Game. University of Nebraska Press. ISBN 978-0-8032-6255-3. OCLC 70261798.
- Burgos, Adrian (2007). Playing America's Game: Baseball, Latinos, and the Color Line. University of California Press. ISBN 978-0-520-25143-4. OCLC 81150202.
- Burk, Robert F. (2001). Never Just a Game: Players, Owners, and American Baseball to 1920. University of North Carolina Press. ISBN 978-0-8078-4961-3. OCLC 28183874.
- Charlton, James, ed. (1991). The Baseball Chronology: The Complete History of the Most Important Events in the Game of Baseball. Macmillan. ISBN 978-0-02-523971-5. OCLC 22704314.
- Clarke, William Jones & Fredrick Thomas Dawson (1915). Baseball: Individual Play and Team Play in Detail. Charles Scribner's Sons. OCLC 2781766.
- Gmelch, George (2006). Baseball Without Borders: The International Pastime. University of Nebraska Press. ISBN 978-0-8032-7125-8. OCLC 64594333.
- González Echevarría, Roberto (2001). The Pride of Havana: A History of Cuban Baseball. Oxford University Press. ISBN 978-0-19-514605-9. OCLC 46601626.
- Guttmann, Allen (2007). Sports: The First Five Millennia. University of Massachusetts Press. ISBN 978-1-55849-610-1. OCLC 5912442808.
- Guzzo, Glenn (2007). The New Ballgame: Baseball Statistics for the Casual Fan. ACTA. ISBN 978-0-87946-318-2. OCLC 123083947.
- Keri, Jonah, ed. (2007). Baseball Between the Numbers: Why Everything You Know About the Game Is Wrong. Basic. ISBN 978-0-465-00547-5. OCLC 77795904.
- Koppett, Leonard (2004). Koppett's Concise History of Major League Baseball. Carroll & Graf. ISBN 978-0-7867-1286-1. OCLC 54674804.
- Kte'pi, Bill (2009). "Baseball (Amateur)". In Rodney Carlisle (ed.). Encyclopedia of Play in Today's Society, Volume 1. SAGE. ISBN 978-1-4129-6670-2. OCLC 251215353.
- Lewis, Michael M. (2003). Moneyball: The Art of Winning an Unfair Game. W. W. Norton. ISBN 978-0-393-32481-5. OCLC 54896532.
- Mahony, Phillip (2014). Baseball Explained. McFarland Books. ISBN 978-0-7864-7964-1. Archived from the original on August 13, 2014.
- Mandelbaum, Michael (2005). The Meaning of Sports: Why Americans Watch Baseball, Football, and Basketball and What They See When They Do. PublicAffairs. ISBN 978-1-58648-330-2. OCLC 55539339.
- McNeil, William (2000). Baseball's Other All-Stars: The Greatest Players from the Negro Leagues, the Japanese Leagues, the Mexican League, and the Pre-1960 Winter Leagues in Cuba, Puerto Rico, and the Dominican Republic. McFarland. ISBN 978-0-7864-0784-2. OCLC 42976826.
- Morris, Peter (2007). Level Playing Fields: How the Groundskeeping Murphy Brothers Shaped Baseball. University of Nebraska Press. ISBN 978-0-8032-1110-0. OCLC 70884952.
- Porterfield, Jason (2007). Baseball: Rules, Tips, Strategy, and Safety. Rosen. ISBN 978-1-4042-0991-6. OCLC 67773742.
- Powers, Albert Theodore (2003). The Business of Baseball. McFarland. ISBN 978-0-7864-1426-0. OCLC 50866929.
- Puhalla, Jim; Jeff Krans; Mike Goatley (2003). Baseball and Softball Fields: Design, Construction, Renovation, and Maintenance. John Wiley & Sons. ISBN 978-0-471-44793-1. OCLC 50959054.
- Rader, Benjamin G. (2008). Baseball: A History of America's Game (3rd ed.). University of Illinois Press. ISBN 978-0-252-07550-6. OCLC 176980876.
- Riess, Steven A. (1991). City Games: The Evolution of American Urban Society and the Rise of Sports. University of Illinois Press. ISBN 978-0-252-06216-2. OCLC 23739530.
- Rudel, Anthony J. (2008). Hello, Everybody!: The Dawn of American Radio. Houghton Mifflin. ISBN 978-0-15-101275-6. OCLC 192042215.
- Schwarz, Alan (2004). The Numbers Game: Baseball's Lifelong Fascination with Statistics. Thomas Dunne. ISBN 978-0-312-32222-9. OCLC 54692908.
- Stallings, Jack; Bob Bennett, eds. (2003). Baseball Strategies: Your Guide to the Game Within the Game. American Baseball Coaches Association/Human Kinetics. ISBN 978-0-7360-4218-5. OCLC 50203866.
- Sullivan, Dean, ed. (1997). Early Innings: A Documentary History of Baseball, 1825–1908. University of Nebraska Press. ISBN 978-0-8032-9244-4. OCLC 36258074.
- Terry, Thomas Philip (1911). Terry's Mexico: Handbook for Travellers (2nd rev. ed.). Gay and Hancock, Houghton Mifflin, and Sonora News. OCLC 7587420.
- Thurston, Bill (2000). Coaching Youth Baseball: A Baffled Parents Guide. McGraw-Hill. ISBN 978-0-07-135822-4. OCLC 43031493.
- Tygiel, Jules (2000). Past Time: Baseball as History. Oxford University Press. ISBN 978-0-19-508958-5. OCLC 42290019.
- Votano, Paul (2013). Stand and Deliver: A History of Pinch-Hitting. McFarland. ISBN 978-0-7864-1588-5. OCLC 52047315.
- Zimbalist, Andrew (2007). In the Best Interests of Baseball?: The Revolutionary Reign of Bud Selig. John Wiley & Sons. ISBN 978-0-470-12824-4. OCLC 62796332.
- Zoss, Joel (2004). Diamonds in the Rough: The Untold History of Baseball. University of Nebraska Press. ISBN 978-0-8032-9920-7. OCLC 54611393.
