= Parque Los Berros =

Park in Xalapa, Veracruz, Mexico

Coordinates: 19°31′25″N 96°55′01″W

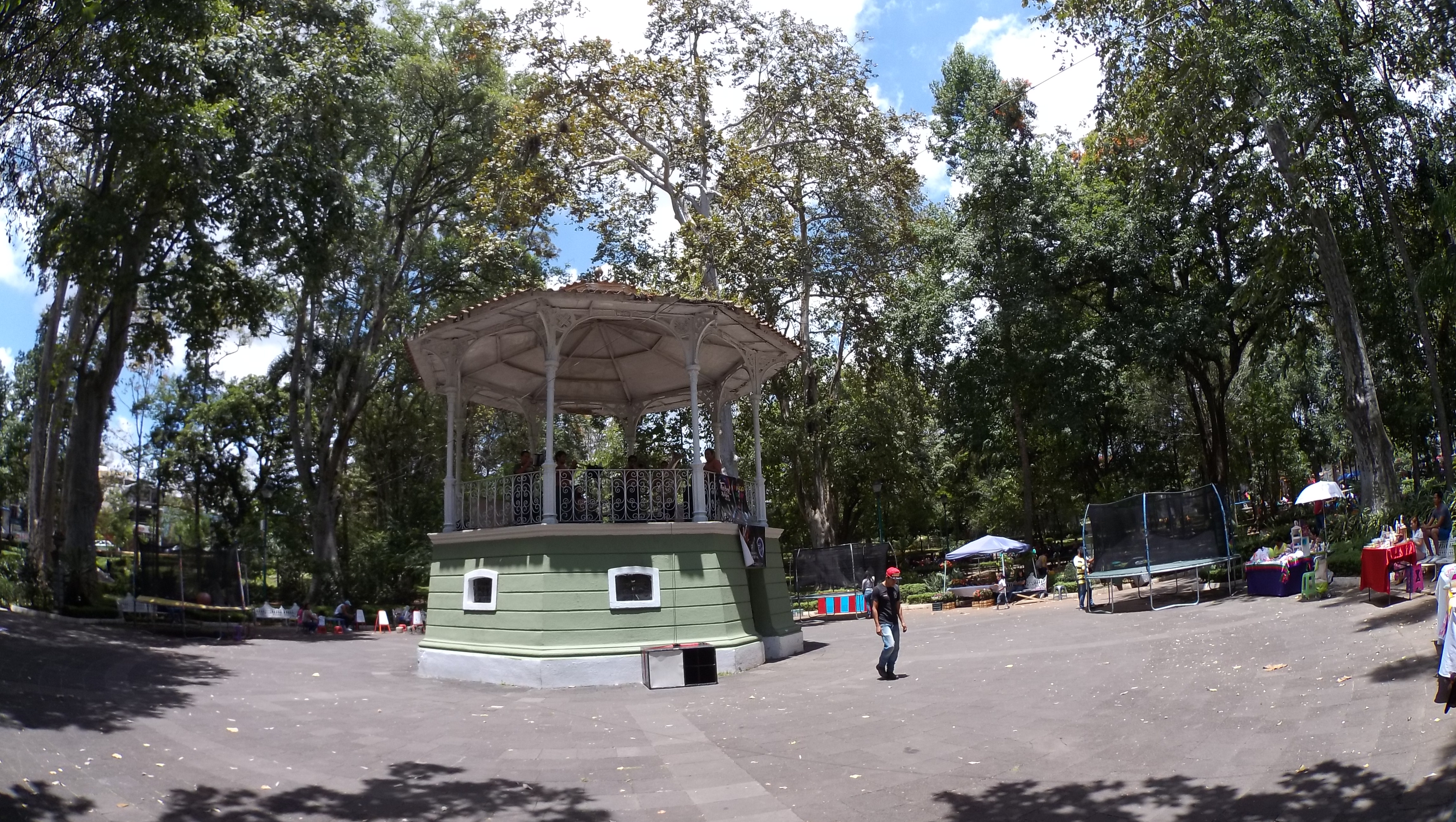
central kiosk in the Berros Park

Parque Los Berros, in Xalapa, Veracruz, is located a short distance to the southeast of the center of town, in the neighbourhood of the Stadium.

Its name was derived from an edible herb called berro (garden cress) that used to grow in the area.

Throughout the 19th century, the place would turn into a mosquito-infested marshland during the Summer rainy season. The rest of the year, it was occasionally used for horse-racing, as is shown in an engraving published in Historia Antigua de Jalapa by Manuel Rivera y Cambas, in 1871.

It was on this site, most probably the army campground, around April 20, 1847, that members of the Fourth Illinois Infantry Regiment played the first game of baseball in Mexico, as gathered from oral tradition and recorded in a 1909 publication, perhaps the first ever played outside the U.S. As a bat, they used the "wooden peg leg" of Antonio López de Santa Anna that they had captured a day or so before, at the Battle of Cerro Gordo.

== Notes ==
- At the Battle of Cerro Gordo, Company C of the 4th Illinois Infantry Regiment had "almost captured Mexican President General Santa Anna, but they had to settle for his cork leg, carriage and $20,000 in gold."
- There were actually two artificial legs, a fancy one (presently on display at the Illinois State Military Museum in Springfield, IL) and a "humble peg leg".
- "American soldiers under Scott and Worth played baseball (1847) with the wooden leg captured (by the Fourth Illinois Regiment) from General Santa Anna."
