= Arroyo Los Berros =

Coordinates: 41°28′S 65°58′W

- Municipality and village
- Interactive map of Arroyo Los Berros
- Country: Argentina
- Province: Río Negro Province
- Department: Valcheta Department
- Time zone: UTC−3 (ART)
- Climate: BSk

Arroyo Los Berros is a village and municipality in Río Negro Province in Argentina.
