= History of baseball =

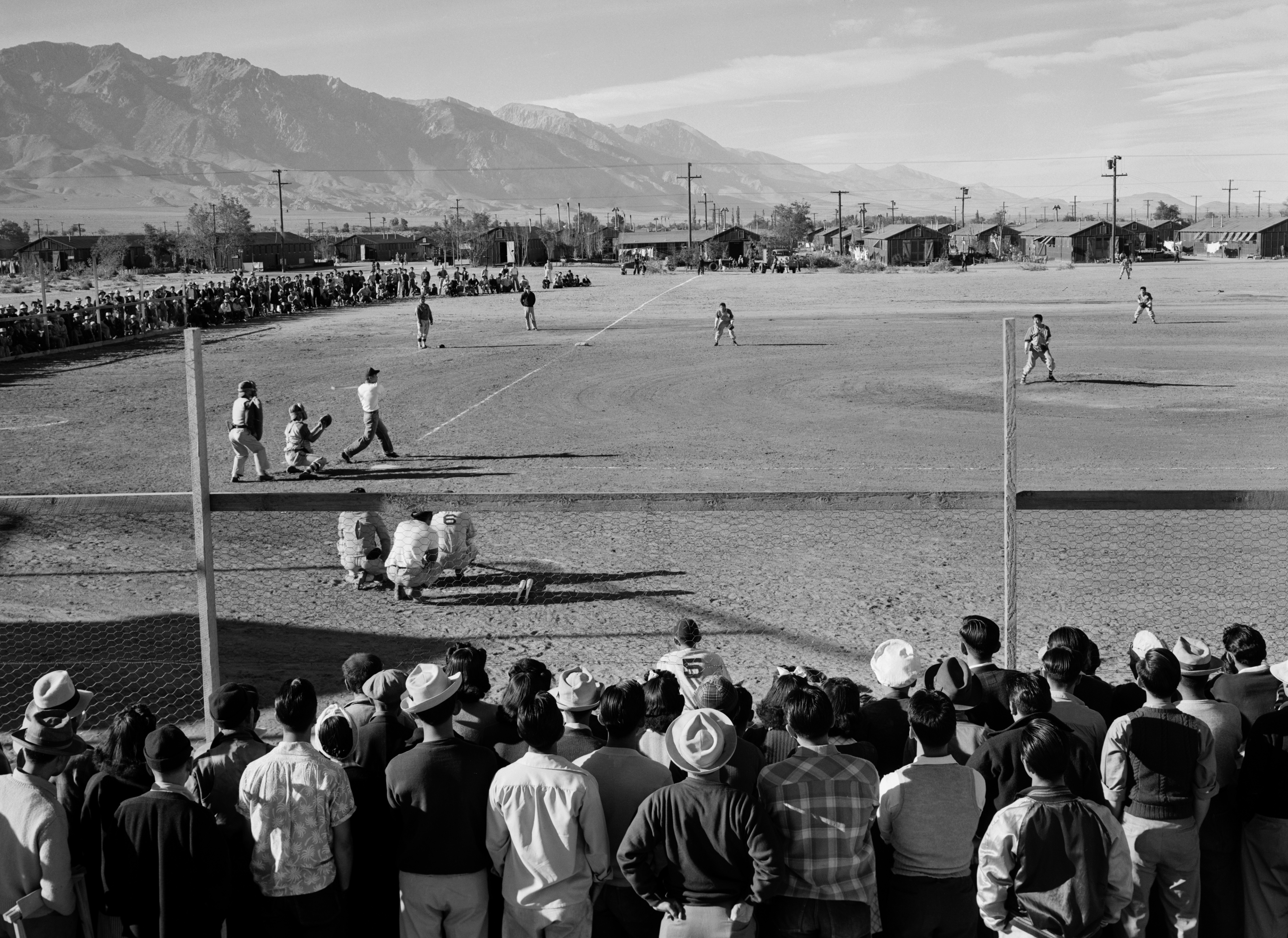
Japanese-Americans spectating a World War II-era game while in an internment camp. America's ties to immigrants and to Japan have been deeply shaped by a shared baseball heritage.

The history of baseball can be broken down into various aspects: by era, by locale, by organizational-type, game evolution, as well as by political and cultural influence. The game evolved from older bat-and-ball games already being played in England by the middle of the 18th century. These games were taken to North America by immigrants, where the modern version developed. By the late 19th century, baseball was widely recognized as the national sport of the United States, and had begun to spread throughout the Pacific Rim and the Americas. Today, baseball is popular in North America and parts of Central and South America, the Caribbean, and East Asia, particularly in Japan, South Korea, and Taiwan.

References to baseball date back to the 1700s when in England it was referenced in 1744 in the children's book A Little Pretty Pocket-Book by John Newberry. The game is also mentioned in the book Northanger Abbey by Jane Austen, published in 1818. In the early 1800s "baseball" and a game first mentioned in 1828 as the aforementioned "rounders" may have been the same or very similar. During the 1830s and 1840s organized amateur club baseball grew up in eastern United States cities; however, the first official baseball game with a documented score card took place not in the US, but in Canada in 1838. While many versions of similar games with various rules existed at the time, innovations made by New York City clubs became the basis for the modern game, far removed from its English ancestor. These clubs formed a national governing body with uniform rules in 1858, the National Association of Base Ball Players. In 1871 the first professional league, the National Association of Professional Base Ball Players, was founded. Five years later, the National League was created; it was followed by the American League in 1901. The first World Series between the champions of the two major leagues was held in 1903, and by 1905 it became an annual event. Baseball early in the 20th century was characterized by low-scoring games, but the dead-ball era ended in the early 1920s with rule changes and the rise of power hitter Babe Ruth. The major leagues had a race barrier against African Americans that lasted until 1947, when Jackie Robinson made his debut. The major leagues began the process of expansion in 1961 and attendance increased from the mid-1970s to 1994, when a work stoppage led to the cancellation of the World Series.

Professional baseball leagues featured teams from Canada as early as 1877, and the sport spread to numerous countries in the 1800s and 1900s. It was played in the Olympics as a medal sport from 1992 to 2008. Other competitions between national teams include the Baseball World Cup and the World Baseball Classic, which was first held in 2006.

== Origins ==
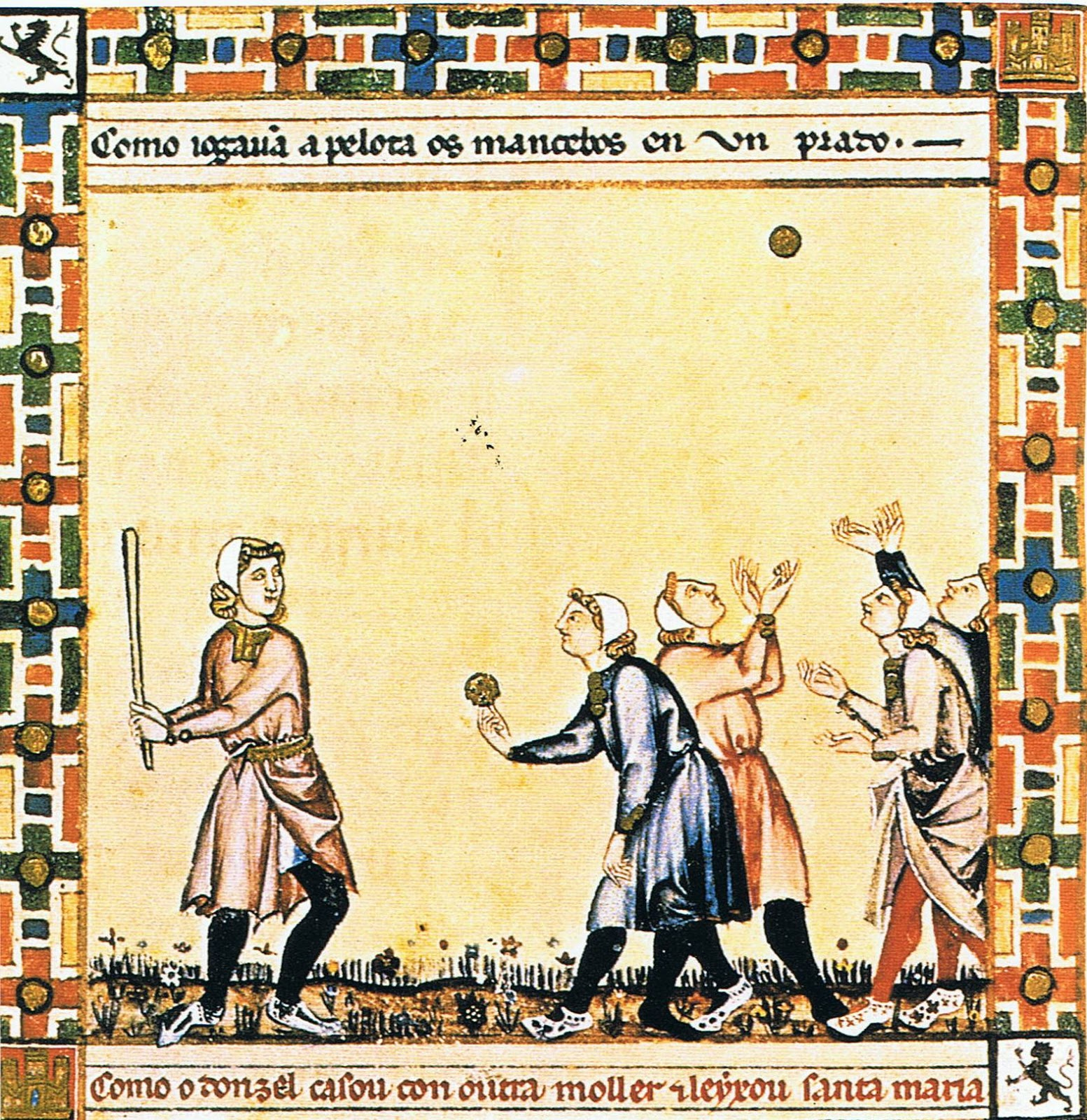
A game from the Cantigas de Santa Maria, c. 1267, involving tossing a ball, hitting it with a stick and competing with others to catch it

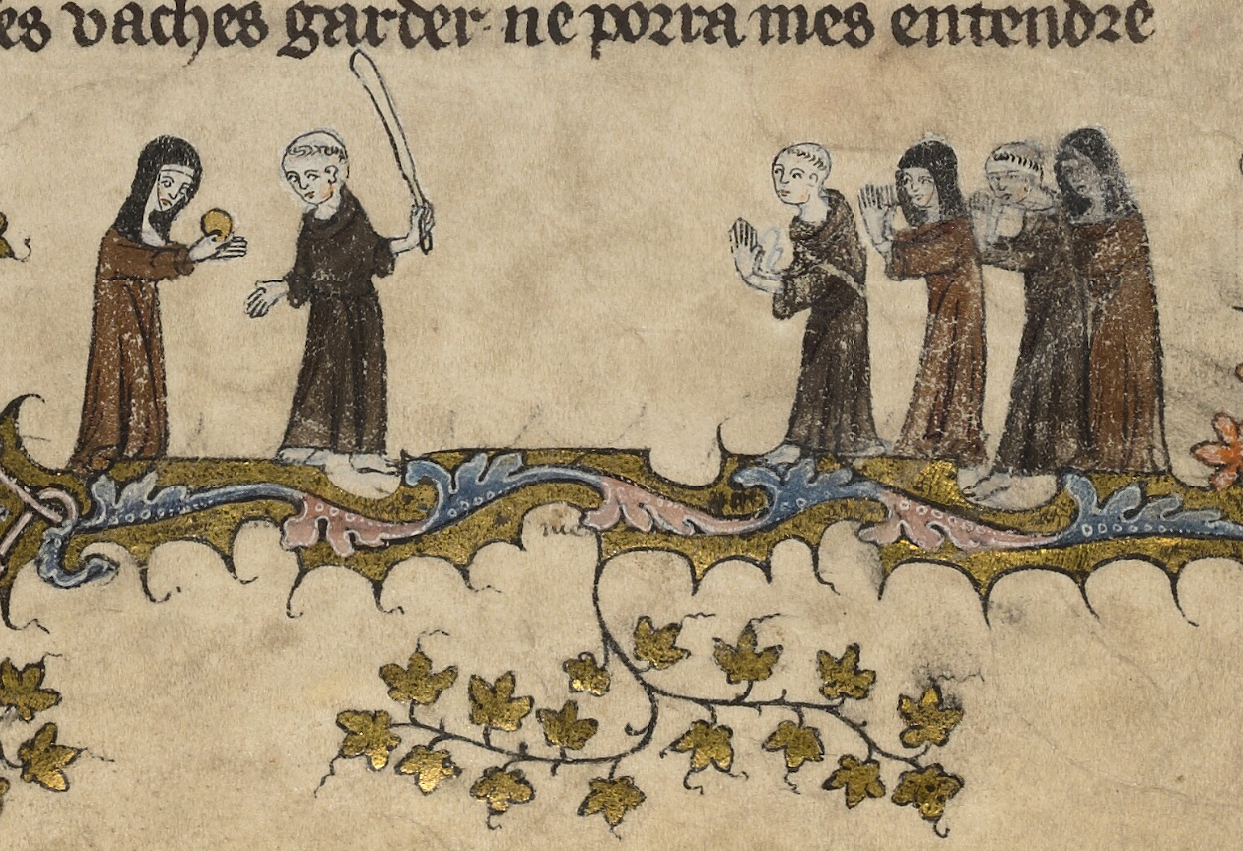
Game illustrated in Tournai, Belgium circa 1304-1410, involving batting a thrown ball.

The evolution of baseball from older bat-and-ball games is difficult to trace with precision. A French manuscript from 1344 contains an illustration of clerics playing a game, possibly la soule, with similarities to baseball. Other old French games such as thèque, la balle au bâton, and la balle empoisonnée also appear to be related. Consensus once held that today's baseball is a North American development from the older game rounders, popular in Great Britain and Ireland. Baseball Before We Knew It: A Search for the Roots of the Game (2005), by David Block, suggests that the game originated in England. Block argues that rounders and early baseball were actually regional variants of each other, and that the game's most direct antecedents are the English games of stoolball and "tut-ball". It has long been believed that cricket also descended from such games, though evidence uncovered in early 2009 suggests that cricket may have been imported to England from Flanders.

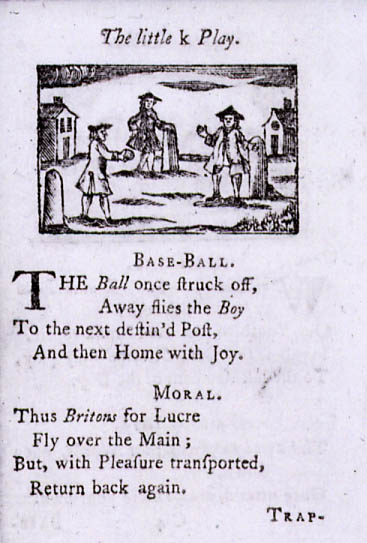
A Little Pretty Pocket-Book (1744), included an illustration of base-ball, depicting a batter, a bowler, and three rounders posts. The rhyme refers to the ball being hit, the boy running to the next post, and then home to score. Updated to four bases by 1828, rounders has remained extremely popular among children in the UK.

The earliest known reference to baseball is in a 1744 British children's publication, A Little Pretty Pocket-Book, by John Newbery. It contains a rhymed description of "base-ball" and a woodcut that shows a field set-up somewhat similar to the modern game—though in a triangular rather than diamond configuration, and with posts instead of ground-level bases. According to John Thorn, official MLB historian, this version of baseball may have involved hitting the ball with a hand, making it akin to today's punchball. Block discovered that the first recorded game of "Base-Ball" took place in 1749 in Surrey, and featured the Prince of Wales as a player. William Bray, an English lawyer, recorded a game of baseball on Easter Monday 1755 in Guildford, Surrey. This early form of the game was apparently brought to Canada by English immigrants. Rounders was also brought to the United States by Canadians of both British and Irish ancestry. The first known American reference to baseball appears in a 1791 Pittsfield, Massachusetts town bylaw prohibiting the playing of the game near the town's new meeting house. By 1796, a version of the game was well known enough to earn a mention in a German scholar's book on popular pastimes. As described by Johann Gutsmuths, "englische Base-ball" involved a contest between two teams, in which "the batter has three attempts to hit the ball while at the home plate." Only one out was required to retire a side.

In 1828, William Clarke in London published the second edition of The Boy's Own Book, which included the rules of rounders and contained the first printed description in English of a bat and ball base-running game played on a diamond. The following year, the book was published in Boston, Massachusetts.

By the early 1830s, there were reports of a variety of uncodified bat-and-ball games recognizable as early forms of baseball being played around North America. These games were often referred to locally as "town ball", though other names such as "round-ball" and "base-ball" were also used. Among the earliest examples to receive a detailed description—albeit five decades after the fact, in a letter from an attendee to Sporting Life magazine—took place in Beachville, Ontario, in 1838. There were many similarities to modern baseball, and some crucial differences: five bases (or byes); first bye just 18 feet (5.5 m) from the home bye; batter out if a hit ball was caught after the first bounce.

The once widely accepted story that US Army officer Abner Doubleday invented baseball in Cooperstown, New York, in 1839 has been conclusively debunked by sports historians. The Doubleday myth appeared after a dispute arose about the origins of baseball and whether it had been invented in the United States or developed as a variation of rounders. The theory that the sport was created in the U.S. was backed by Chicago Cubs president Albert Spalding and National League president Abraham G. Mills. In 1889, Mills gave a speech declaring that baseball was American, which he said was determined through "patriotism and research"; a crowd of about 300 people responding by chanting "No rounders!" The rounders theory was supported by prominent sportswriter Henry Chadwick, a native of Britain who noted common factors between rounders and baseball in a 1903 article. In 1905, Spalding called for an investigation into how the sport was invented. Chadwick supported the idea, and later in the year the Mills commission was formed. Spalding instructed the commission to decide between the American game of "Old Cat" and rounders as baseball's predecessor. Seven men served on the commission, including Mills. Spalding chose the committee's members, picking men who supported his theory and excluding supporters of the rounders claim, such as Chadwick.

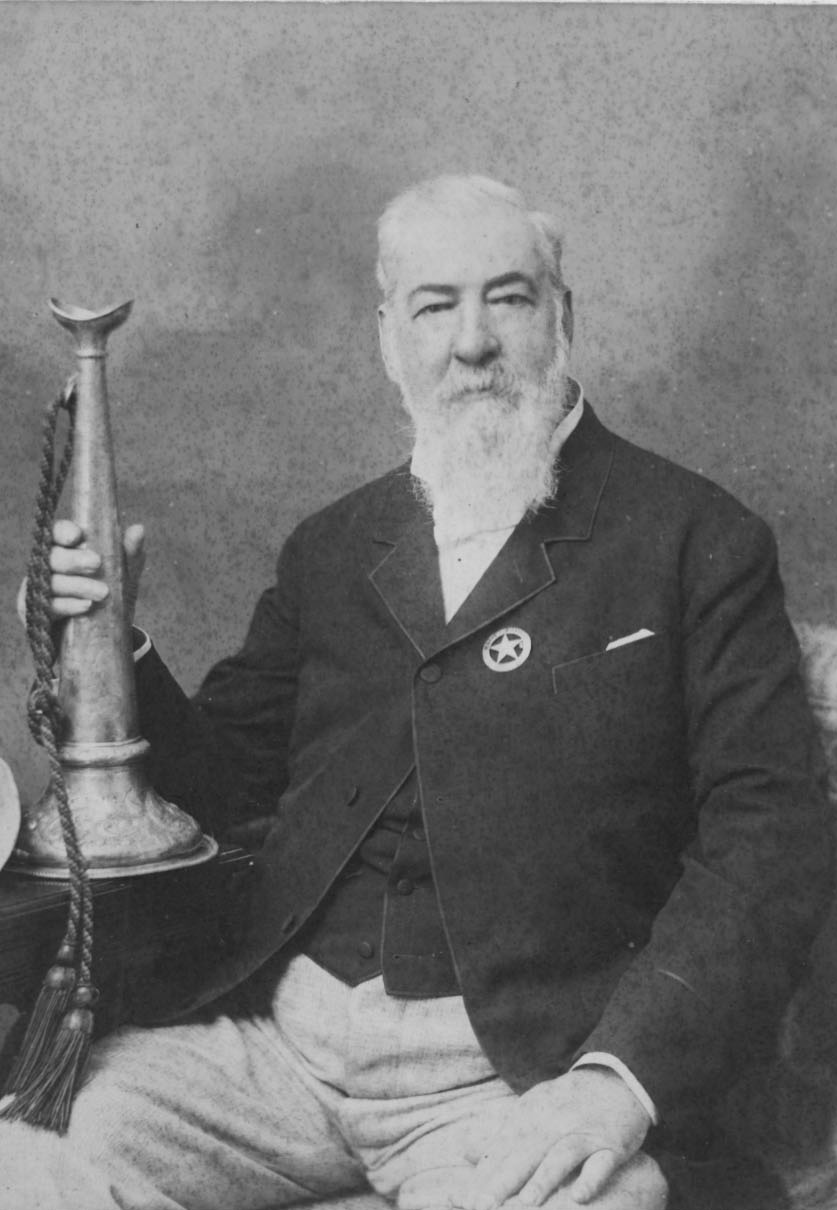
Alexander Cartwright, father of modern baseball

In 1845, Alexander Cartwright, a member of New York City's Knickerbocker Club, produced a code of baseball rules now called the Knickerbocker Rules. The practice, common to bat-and-ball games of the day, of "soaking" or "plugging"—effecting a putout by hitting a runner with a thrown ball—was barred. The rules thus facilitated the use of a smaller, harder ball than had been common. Several other rules also brought the Knickerbockers' game close to the modern one, though a ball caught on the first bounce was, again, an out and only underhand pitching was allowed. While there are reports that the New York Knickerbockers played games in 1845, the contest long recognized as the first officially recorded baseball game in U.S. history took place on June 19, 1846, in Hoboken, New Jersey: the "New York Nine" defeated the Knickerbockers, 23–1, in four innings. With the Knickerbocker code as the basis, the rules of modern baseball continued to evolve over the next half-century.

== In the United States ==
=== Professional leagues develop ===
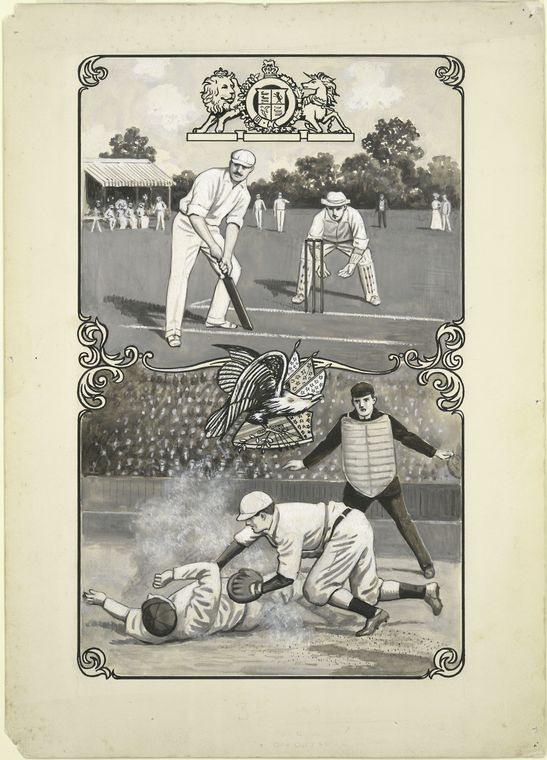
By the 1860s Civil War, baseball (bottom) had overtaken its fellow bat-and-ball sport cricket (top) in popularity within the United States. (Note: Partially because baseball was much shorter in duration than the form of cricket played at the time and did not require a special playing surface.) (Note: Growing American influence abroad meant the same occurred in Japan and the Dominican Republic by the early 20th century.)

In the mid-1850s, a baseball craze hit the New York metropolitan area. By 1856, local journals were referring to baseball as the "national pastime" or "national game". In 1857, 16 area clubs formed the sport's first governing body, the National Association of Base Ball Players. In 1863, the organization disallowed putouts made by catching a fair ball on the first bounce. Four years later, it barred participation by African Americans. The game's commercial potential was developing: in 1869 the first fully professional baseball club, the Cincinnati Red Stockings, was formed and went undefeated against a schedule of semipro and amateur teams. They still remain as baseball's only undefeated team during the regular season. The first professional league, the National Association of Professional Base Ball Players, lasted from 1871 to 1875; scholars dispute its status as a major league.

The more formally structured National League was founded in 1876. As the oldest surviving major league, the National League is sometimes referred to as the "senior circuit." Several other major leagues formed and failed. In 1884, African American Moses Walker (and, briefly, his brother Welday) played in one of these, the American Association. An injury ended Walker's major league career, and by the early 1890s, a gentlemen's agreement in the form of the baseball color line effectively barred black players from the white-owned professional leagues, major and minor. Professional Negro leagues formed, but quickly folded. Several independent African American teams succeeded as barnstormers. Also in 1884, overhand pitching was legalized. In 1887, softball, under the name of indoor baseball or indoor-outdoor, was invented as a winter version of the parent game. Virtually all of the modern baseball rules were in place by 1893; the last major change—counting foul balls as strikes—was instituted in 1901. The National League's first successful counterpart, the American League, which evolved from the minor Western League, was established that year. The two leagues, each with eight teams, were rivals that fought for the best players, often disregarding each other's contracts and engaging in bitter legal disputes.

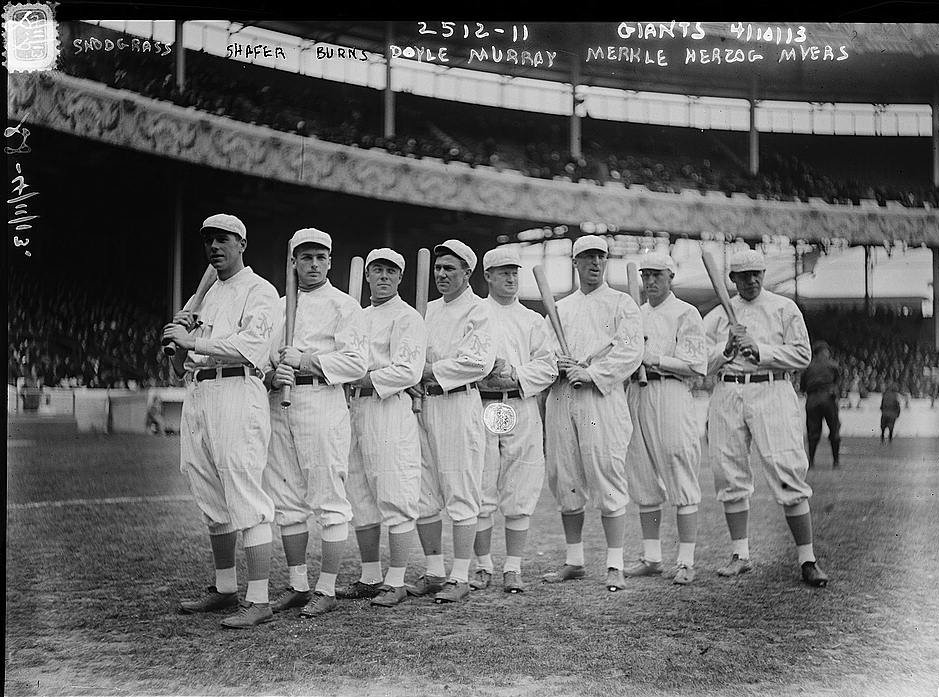
The NL champion New York Giants baseball team, 1913. Fred Merkle, sixth in line, had committed a baserunning gaffe in a crucial 1908 game that became famous as Merkle's Boner.

A modicum of peace was eventually established, leading to the National Agreement of 1903. The pact formalized relations both between the two major leagues and between them and the National Association of Professional Base Ball Leagues, representing most of the country's minor professional leagues. The National Baseball Commission was created to oversee Organized Baseball. The World Series, pitting the two major league champions against each other, was inaugurated that fall, albeit without express major league sanction: The Boston Americans of the American League defeated the Pittsburgh Pirates of the National League. The next year, the series was not held, as the National League champion New York Giants, under manager John McGraw, refused to recognize the major league status of the American League and its champion. In 1905, the Giants were National League champions again and team management relented, leading to the establishment of the World Series as the major leagues' annual championship event.

As professional baseball became increasingly profitable, players frequently raised grievances against owners over issues of control and equitable income distribution. During the major leagues' early decades, players on various teams occasionally attempted strikes, which routinely failed when their jobs were sufficiently threatened. In general, the strict rules of baseball contracts and the reserve clause, which bound players to their teams even when their contracts had ended, tended to keep the players in check. Motivated by dislike for particularly stingy owner Charles Comiskey and gamblers' payoffs, real and promised, members of the Chicago White Sox conspired to throw the 1919 World Series. The Black Sox Scandal led to the dissolution of the National Baseball Commission and the formation of the office of the Commissioner of Baseball. The first commissioner, Kenesaw Mountain Landis, was elected in 1920. That year also saw the founding of the Negro National League; the first significant Negro league, it would operate until 1931. For part of the 1920s, it was joined by the Eastern Colored League. On May 29, 1922, the U.S. Supreme Court ruled in the case Federal Baseball Club v. National League that MLB's activities were not considered interstate commerce and therefore not subject to federal antitrust law; MLB is the only American major sports league that has such a status, and has not faced any competition since this case; the last competitor was the Federal League, which played as a major league in 1914 and 1915. However, this ruling has been weakened only slightly in subsequent years.

=== Rise of Ruth and integration ===
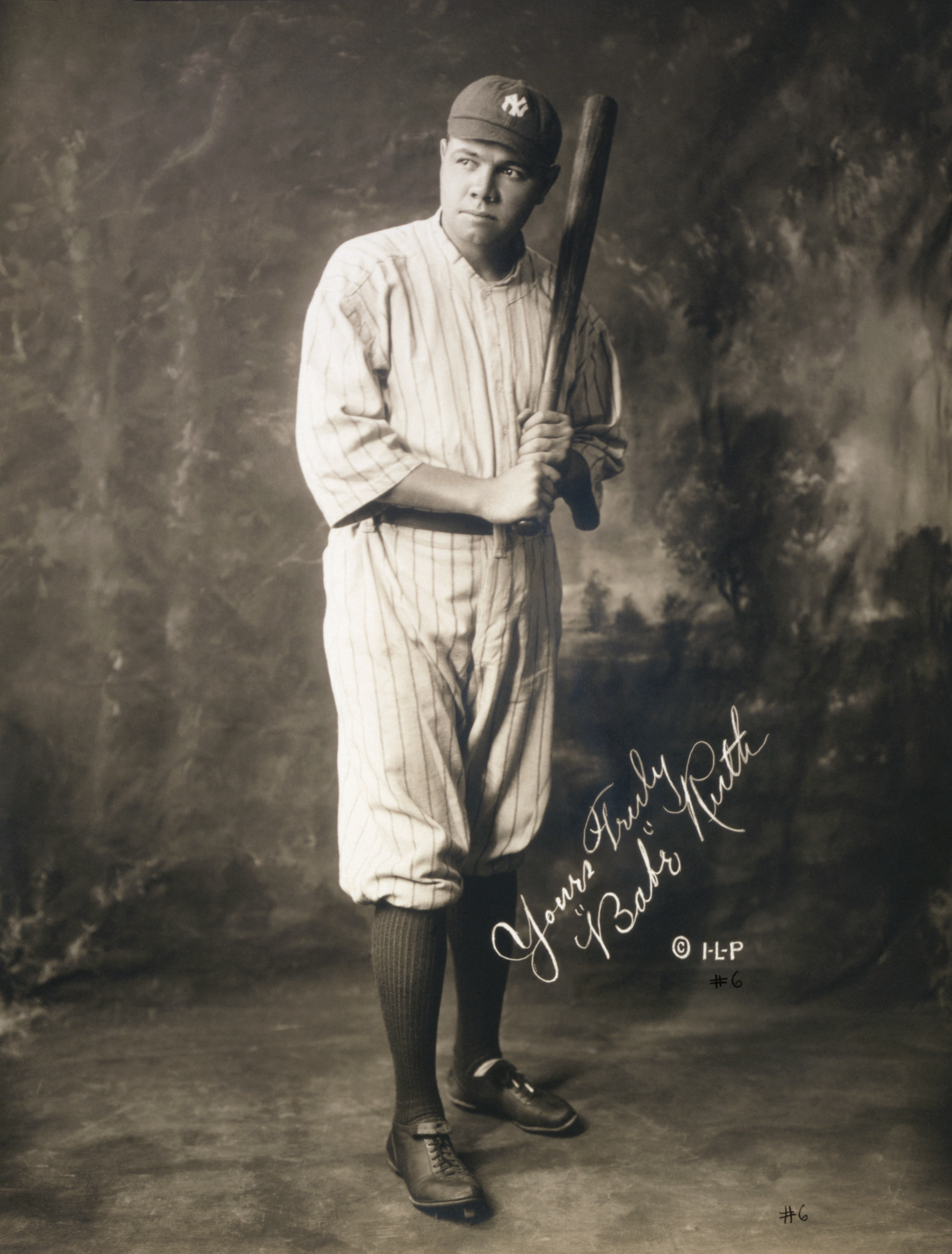
Babe Ruth in 1920, the year he joined the New York Yankees

Compared with the present, professional baseball in the early 20th century was lower-scoring, and pitchers, including stars Walter Johnson and Christy Mathewson, were more dominant. The "inside game", which demanded that players "scratch for runs", was played much more aggressively than it is today: The so-called dead-ball era ended in the early 1920s with several changes in rule and circumstance that were advantageous to hitters. Strict new regulations governing the ball's size, shape and composition, along with a new rule officially banning the spitball and other pitches that depended on the ball being treated or roughed-up with foreign substances, followed the death of Ray Chapman after a pitch struck him in the head in August 1920. Coupled with superior materials available after World War I, this resulted in a ball that traveled farther when hit. The construction of additional seating to accommodate the rising popularity of the game often had the effect of reducing the distance to the outfield fences, making home runs more common. The rise of the legendary player Babe Ruth, the first great power hitter of the new era, helped permanently alter the nature of the game. The club with which Ruth set most of his slugging records, the New York Yankees, built a reputation as the majors' premier team. In the late 1920s and early 1930s, St. Louis Cardinals general manager Branch Rickey invested in several minor league clubs and developed the first modern "farm system". A new Negro National League was organized in 1933; four years later, it was joined by the Negro American League. The first elections to the National Baseball Hall of Fame took place in 1936. In 1939 Little League Baseball was founded in Pennsylvania. By the late 1940s, it was the organizing body for children's baseball leagues across the United States.

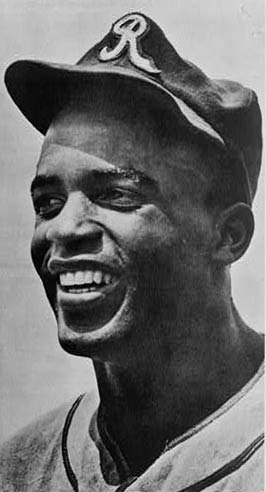
Jackie Robinson in 1945, with the era's Kansas City Royals, a barnstorming squad associated with the Negro American League's Kansas City Monarchs

With America's entry into World War II, many professional players had left to serve in the armed forces. A large number of minor league teams disbanded as a result and the major league game seemed under threat as well. Chicago Cubs owner Philip K. Wrigley led the formation of a new professional league with women players to help keep the game in the public eye—the All-American Girls Professional Baseball League existed from 1943 to 1954. The inaugural College World Series was held in 1947, and the Babe Ruth League youth program was founded. This program soon became another important organizing body for children's baseball. The first crack in the unwritten rules barring blacks from white-controlled professional ball occurred the previous year: Jackie Robinson was signed by the National League's Brooklyn Dodgers—where Branch Rickey had become general manager—and began playing for their minor league team in Montreal. On April 15, 1947, Robinson broke the major leagues' color barrier when he debuted with the Dodgers; Larry Doby debuted with the American League's Cleveland Indians later the same year. Latin American players, largely overlooked before, also started entering the majors in greater numbers. In 1951, two Chicago White Sox, Venezuelan-born Chico Carrasquel and black Cuban-born Minnie Miñoso, became the first Hispanic All-Stars.

Facing competition as varied as television and football, baseball attendance at all levels declined. While the majors rebounded by the mid-1950s, the minor leagues were gutted and hundreds of semipro and amateur teams dissolved. Integration proceeded slowly: by 1953, only six of the 16 major league teams had a black player on the roster. That year, the Major League Baseball Players Association was founded. It was the first professional baseball union to survive more than briefly, but it remained largely ineffective for years. No major league team had been located west of St. Louis until 1955, when the Philadelphia Athletics moved to Kansas City followed by the Brooklyn Dodgers and New York Giants relocating to Los Angeles and San Francisco, respectively. The majors' final all-white bastion, the Boston Red Sox, added a black player in 1959. With the integration of the majors drying up the available pool of players, the last Negro league folded the following year. In 1961, the American League reached the West Coast with the Los Angeles Angels expansion team, and the major league season was extended from 154 games to 162. This coincidentally helped Roger Maris break Babe Ruth's long-standing single-season home run record, one of the most celebrated marks in baseball. Along with the Angels, three other new franchises were launched during 1961–62. With this, the first major league expansion in 60 years, each league now had ten teams.

=== Attendance records, the age of today ===
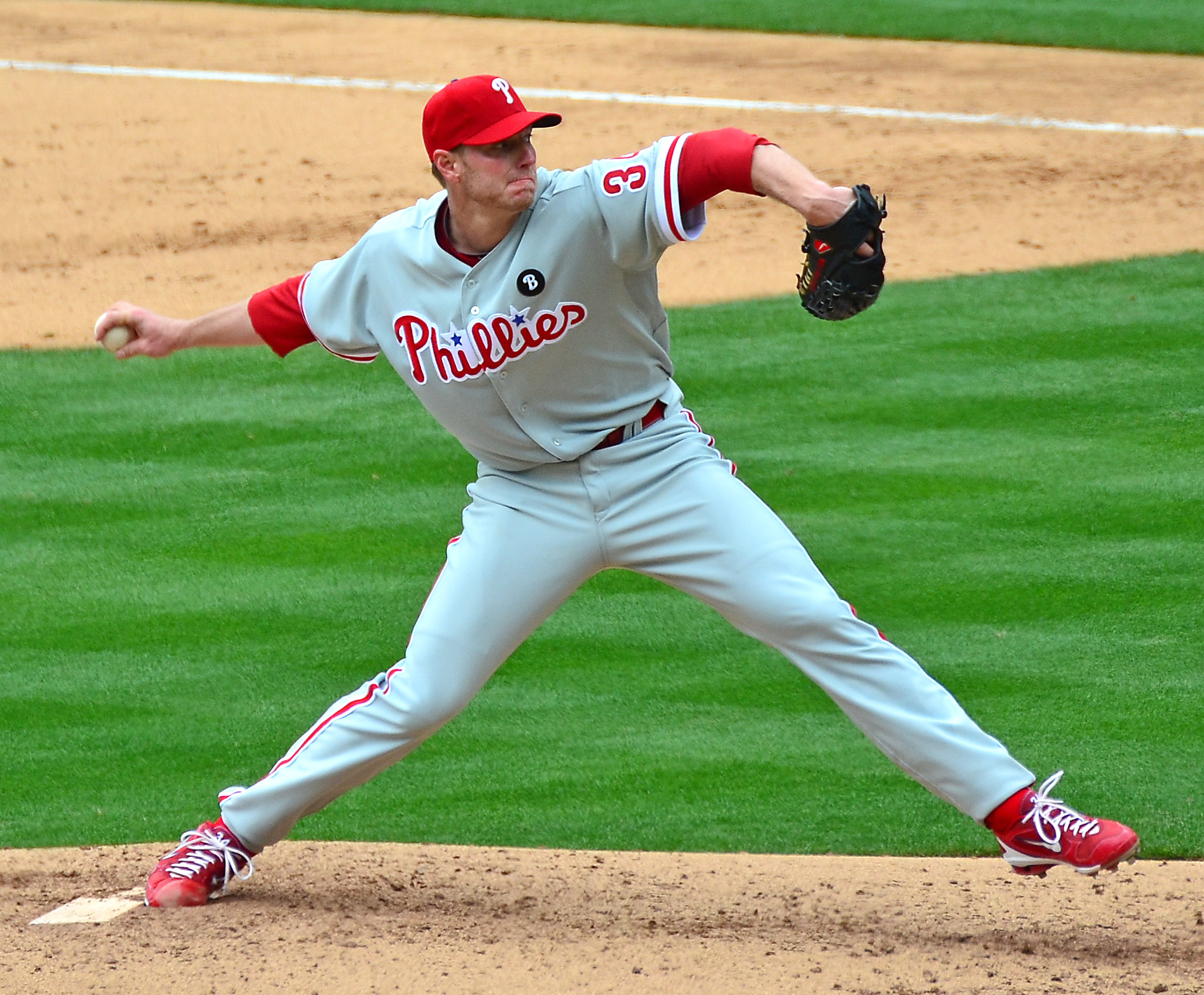
In May 2010, the Philadelphia Phillies' Roy Halladay pitched the 20th major league perfect game. That October, he pitched only the second no-hitter in MLB postseason history.

The players' union became bolder under the leadership of former United Steelworkers chief economist and negotiator Marvin Miller, who was elected executive director in 1966. On the playing field, major league pitchers were becoming increasingly dominant again. After the 1968 season, in an effort to restore balance, the strike zone was reduced and the height of the pitcher's mound was lowered from 15 to 10 inches (38.1–25.4 cm). In 1969, both the National and American Leagues added two more expansion teams, the leagues were reorganized into two divisions each, and a new tier of the playoffs, the League Championship Series that decided the World Series participants was instituted. Also that same year, Curt Flood of the St. Louis Cardinals made the first serious legal challenge to the reserve clause. The major leagues' first general players' strike took place in 1972, delaying the season's start for two weeks. In another effort to add more offense to the game, the American League adopted the designated hitter rule the following year. In 1975, the union's power—and players' salaries—began to increase greatly when the reserve clause was effectively struck down, leading to the free agency system. In 1977, two more expansion teams joined the American League. Significant work stoppages occurred again in 1981 and 1994, the former causing a split-season playoff format, and the latter forcing the cancellation of the World Series for the first time in 90 years. Attendance had been growing steadily since the mid-1970s and in 1994, before the stoppage, the majors were setting their all-time record for per-game attendance.

The addition of two more expansion teams after the 1993 season had facilitated another restructuring of the major leagues, this time into three divisions each. Offensive production—the number of home runs in particular—had surged that year, and again in the abbreviated 1994 season. After play resumed in 1995, this trend continued and one non-division-winning wild card team and a second tier of the playoffs, the League Division Series was added, in addition to both leagues now having three divisions each (with the addition of the Central Division). Regular-season interleague play was introduced in 1997 and the second-highest attendance mark for a full season was set. The next year, Mark McGwire and Sammy Sosa both surpassed Maris's decades-old single-season home run record, and two more expansion franchises were added. In 2000, the National and American Leagues were dissolved as legal entities. While their identities were maintained for scheduling purposes (and the designated hitter distinction until 2022), the regulations and other functions—such as player discipline and umpire supervision—they had administered separately were consolidated under the rubric of Major League Baseball (MLB).

In 2001, Barry Bonds established the current record of 73 home runs in a single season. There had long been suspicions that the dramatic increase in power hitting was fueled in large part by the abuse of illegal steroids (as well as by the dilution of pitching talent due to expansion), but the issue only began attracting significant media attention in 2002 and there was no penalty for the use of performance-enhancing drugs before 2004. In 2007, Bonds became MLB's all-time home run leader, surpassing Hank Aaron (Bonds finished his career that year with 762 home runs), as total major league and minor league attendance both reached all-time highs. Even though McGwire, Sosa, and Bonds—as well as many other players, including storied pitcher Roger Clemens—have been implicated in the steroid abuse scandal, their feats and those of other sluggers had become the major leagues' defining attraction. In contrast to the professional game's resurgence in popularity after the 1994 interruption, Little League enrollment was in decline: after peaking in 1996, it dropped 1 percent a year over the following decade. With more rigorous testing and penalties for performance-enhancing drug use a possible factor, the balance between bat and ball swung markedly in 2010, which became known as the "Year of the Pitcher". Runs per game fell to their lowest level in 18 years, and the strikeout rate was higher than it had been in half a century.

Before the start of the 2012 season, MLB altered its rules to double the number of wild card teams admitted into the playoffs to two per league. The playoff expansion resulted in the addition of annual one-game playoffs between the wild card teams in each league. MLB's playoffs would be expanded further in 2022, with three Wild Card teams per league (with six teams in each league qualifying now), and turning the Wild Card game into a Wild Card series. Also that season, MLB instituted the universal designated hitter, thus ending the National League use of pitchers batting for themselves.

== Around the world ==
Baseball, widely known as America's pastime, is well established in several other countries as well. The history of baseball in Canada has remained closely linked with that of the sport in the United States. As early as 1877, a professional league, the International Association, featured teams from both countries. While baseball is widely played in Canada and many minor league teams have been based in the country, the American major leagues did not include a Canadian club until 1969, when the Montreal Expos joined the National League as an expansion team. In 1977, the expansion Toronto Blue Jays joined the American League. The Blue Jays won the World Series in 1992 and 1993, the first and still the only club from outside the United States to do so. After the 2004 season, Major League Baseball relocated the Expos to Washington, D.C., where the team is now known as the Nationals.

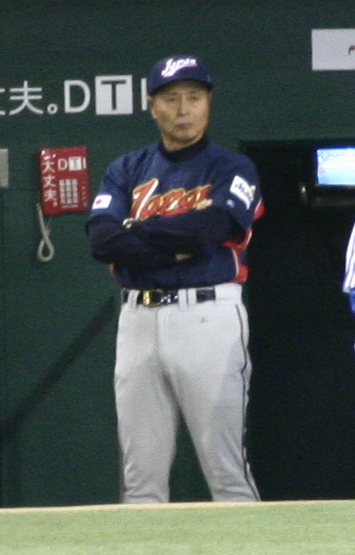
Sadaharu Oh managing the Japan national team in the 2006 World Baseball Classic. Playing for the Central League's Yomiuri Giants (1959–80), Oh set the professional world record for home runs with 868.

In 1847, American soldiers played what may have been the first baseball game in Mexico at Parque Los Berros in Xalapa, Veracruz. A few days after the Battle of Cerro Gordo, they used the "wooden leg captured (by the Fourth Illinois regiment) from General Santa Anna". The first formal baseball league outside of the United States and Canada was founded in 1878 in Cuba, which maintains a rich baseball tradition and whose national team has been one of the world's strongest since international play began in the late 1930s (all organized baseball in the country has officially been amateur since the Cuban Revolution). The Dominican Republic held its first islandwide championship tournament in 1912. Professional baseball tournaments and leagues began to form in other countries between the world wars, including the Netherlands (formed in 1922), Australia (1934), Japan (1936), Mexico (1937), and Puerto Rico (1938). The Japanese major leagues—the Central League and Pacific League—have long been considered the highest quality professional circuits outside of the United States. Japan has a professional minor league system as well, though it is much smaller than the American version—each team has only one farm club in contrast to MLB teams' four or five.

After World War II, professional leagues were founded in many Latin American countries, most prominently Venezuela (1946) and the Dominican Republic (1955). Since the early 1970s, the annual Caribbean Series has matched the championship clubs from the four leading Latin American winter leagues: the Dominican Professional Baseball League, Mexican Pacific League, Puerto Rican Professional Baseball League, and Venezuelan Professional Baseball League. In Asia, South Korea (1982), Taiwan (1990) and China (2003) all have professional leagues.

Many European countries have professional leagues as well, the most successful, other than the Dutch league, being the Italian league founded in 1948. Compared to those in Asia and Latin America, the various European leagues and the one in Australia historically have had no more than niche appeal. In 2004, Australia won a surprise silver medal at the 2004 Summer Olympics. The Israel Baseball League, launched in 2007, folded after one season. The Confédération Européene de Baseball (European Baseball Confederation), founded in 1953, organizes a number of competitions between clubs from different countries, as well as national squads. Other competitions between national teams, such as the Baseball World Cup and the Olympic baseball tournament, were administered by the International Baseball Federation (IBAF) from its formation in 1938 until its 2013 merger with the International Softball Federation to create the current joint governing body for both sports, the World Baseball Softball Confederation (WBSC). By 2009, the IBAF had 117 member countries. Women's baseball is played on an organized amateur basis in numerous countries. Since 2004, the IBAF and now WBSC have sanctioned the Women's Baseball World Cup, featuring national teams.

After being admitted to the Olympics as a medal sport beginning at the 1992 Summer Olympics, baseball was dropped from the 2012 Summer Olympics at the 2005 International Olympic Committee meeting. It remained part of the 2008 Summer Olympics. The elimination of baseball, along with softball, from the 2012 Olympic program enabled the IOC to consider adding two different sports, but none received the votes required for inclusion. While the sport's lack of a following in much of the world was a factor, more important was Major League Baseball's reluctance to have a break during the Games to allow its players to participate, as the National Hockey League now does during the Winter Olympic Games. Such a break is more difficult for MLB to accommodate because it would force the playoffs deeper into cold weather. Seeking reinstatement for the 2016 Summer Olympics, the IBAF proposed an abbreviated competition designed to facilitate the participation of top players, but the effort failed. Major League Baseball initiated the World Baseball Classic, scheduled to precede the major league season, partly as a replacement, high-profile international tournament. The inaugural Classic, held in March 2006, was the first tournament involving national teams to feature a significant number of MLB participants. The World Baseball Classic takes place every four years. The tournament features the sixteen best national teams. The first team to win was Japan. The Baseball World Cup was discontinued after its 2011 edition in favor of an expanded World Baseball Classic.

== See also ==
- Variations of baseball#History

== Sources ==
- Bjarkman, Peter C. (2004). Diamonds Around the Globe: The Encyclopedia of International Baseball. Greenwood. ISBN 0-313-32268-6. OCLC 58806121.
- Blair, Roger D. (2012). Sports Economics. Cambridge University Press. ISBN 978-0-521-87661-2. OCLC 898662502.
- Block, David (2005). Baseball Before We Knew It: A Search for the Roots of the Game. University of Nebraska Press. ISBN 0-8032-6255-8. OCLC 70261798.
- Burgos, Adrian (2007). Playing America's Game: Baseball, Latinos, and the Color Line. University of California Press. ISBN 978-0-520-25143-4. OCLC 81150202.
- Burk, Robert F. (2001). Never Just a Game: Players, Owners, and American Baseball to 1920. University of North Carolina Press. ISBN 0-8078-4961-8. OCLC 28183874.
- Gmelch, George (2006). Baseball Without Borders: The International Pastime. University of Nebraska Press. ISBN 0-8032-7125-5. OCLC 64594333.
- Heaphy, Leslie A. (2003). The Negro Leagues, 1869–1960. McFarland. ISBN 0-7864-1380-8. OCLC 50285143.
- Koppett, Leonard (2004). Koppett's Concise History of Major League Baseball. Carroll & Graf. ISBN 0-7867-1286-4. OCLC 54674804.
- McNeil, William (2000). Baseball's Other All-Stars: The Greatest Players from the Negro Leagues, the Japanese Leagues, the Mexican League, and the Pre-1960 Winter Leagues in Cuba, Puerto Rico, and the Dominican Republic. McFarland. ISBN 0-7864-0784-0. OCLC 42976826.
- Powers, Albert Theodore (2003). The Business of Baseball. McFarland. ISBN 0-7864-1426-X. OCLC 50866929.
- Rader, Benjamin G. (2008). Baseball: A History of America's Game (3rd ed.). University of Illinois Press. ISBN 978-0-252-07550-6. OCLC 176980876.
- Riess, Steven A. (1991). City Games: The Evolution of American Urban Society and the Rise of Sports. University of Illinois Press. ISBN 0-252-06216-7. OCLC 23739530.
- Ryczek, William J. (2009). Baseball's First Inning: A History of the National Pastime Through the Civil War. McFarland & Company. ISBN 978-0-7864-4194-5.
- Seymour, Harold (1989). Baseball: The Early Years. Oxford University Press. ISBN 978-0-19-503890-3.
- Sullivan, Dean, ed. (1997). Early Innings: A Documentary History of Baseball, 1825–1908. University of Nebraska Press. ISBN 0-8032-9244-9. OCLC 36258074.
- Sullivan, Dean, ed. (1998). Middle Innings: A Documentary History of Baseball, 1900–1948. University of Nebraska Press. ISBN 0-8032-4258-1. OCLC 37533976.
- Sullivan, Dean, ed. (2002). Late Innings: A Documentary History of Baseball, 1945–1972. University of Nebraska Press. ISBN 0-8032-9285-6. OCLC 47643746.
- Terry, Thomas Philip (1911). Terry's Mexico: Handbook for Travellers (2nd rev. ed.). Gay and Hancock, Houghton Mifflin, and Sonora News. OCLC 7587420.
- Tygiel, Jules (2000). Past Time: Baseball as History. Oxford University Press. ISBN 0-19-508958-8. OCLC 42290019.
- Zimbalist, Andrew (2007). In the Best Interests of Baseball?: The Revolutionary Reign of Bud Selig. John Wiley & Sons. ISBN 978-0-470-12824-4. OCLC 62796332.
- Zoss, Joel (2004). Diamonds in the Rough: The Untold History of Baseball. University of Nebraska Press. ISBN 0-8032-9920-6. OCLC 54611393.
