= Baseball Before We Knew It =

2005 book by David Block

Baseball Before We Knew It: A Search for the Roots of the Game
- Author: David Block
- Language: English
- Genre: Non-fiction
- Published: 2005
- Publisher: University of Nebraska Press
- Publication place: United States
- Pages: 340
- ISBN: 9780803213395
- OCLC: 56014560

Baseball Before We Knew It: A Search for the Roots of the Game is a 2005 book by David Block about the history of baseball. Block looks into the early history of baseball, the debates about baseball's beginnings, and presents new evidence. The book received the 2006 Seymour Medal from the Society for American Baseball Research (SABR).

The account, first published in 1905, that Abner Doubleday invented baseball in 1839 was once widely promoted and widely believed. However, this belief was discredited almost immediately. Although the Doubleday myth was never taken seriously by historians, Block showed that the narrative that supplanted it was also deeply flawed. In this accounting, baseball was understood as the derivation of an English children's game, rounders, but America was allowed to retain patrimony over its national pastime through the assertion that it had been reinvented as a modern sport by the members of the New York Knickerbockers, who codified its rules for the first time in 1845. This idea, according to Block is wrong in almost every aspect. In the book, Block argues that baseball was not a product of rounders, and its essential form had already been established by the late 18th century.

Block's new evidence in the matter includes the first known record of the term base-ball in the United States. It came in a 1791 ordinance in Pittsfield, Massachusetts, that banned ballplaying near the town's new meetinghouse. However, that was not the first appearance of "base-ball" in print. That distinction belongs to an English book, A Little Pretty Pocket-Book (1744). By 1796 the rules of this English game were well enough established to earn a mention in German scholar Johann Gutsmuths book on popular pastimes, that described "Englische Base-ball" involved a contest between two teams, in which "the batter has three attempts to hit the ball while at the home plate"; only one out was required to retire a side. The book also predates the rules laid out by the New York Knickerbockers by nearly fifty years. In the book, Block suggests that it was the English game of baseball that had arrived in the U.S. as part of "a sweeping tide of cultural migration" during the colonial period. Once on American soil, the game developed popular regional variations that included "town-ball", "round-ball" and the "New York game".

English baseball was itself the product of a prolonged, nonlinear evolution. "Tut-ball" may have been its immediate predecessor. "Stool-ball", an earlier sport, may have been even more influential in the evolution of baseball, and is also a likely parent of cricket, which developed independently. Medieval texts also suggest that baseball's English antecedents may themselves have descended from Continental bat-and-ball games. An illustration in the French manuscript "The Romance of Alexander" (1344) depicts a group of monks and nuns engaged in a game, thought to be "la soule", that looks much like co-ed softball. Two other French games, théque and la balle empoisonée ("poisoned ball"), also bear similarities to early baseball. They could have migrated to England. In Block's words, the field is clear for the French to claim "parental rights over America's National Game."

Block also notes in the book that American researchers during the past half-century "have made only minimal effort to document baseball's early history and for the most part have not been inclined to go looking to European sources for clues."

== Bibliography ==
- David Block (2005). Baseball Before We Knew It: A Search For The Roots Of The Game. Bison Books. ISBN 978-0-8032-1339-5.
