= Tip-cat =

Children's stick game

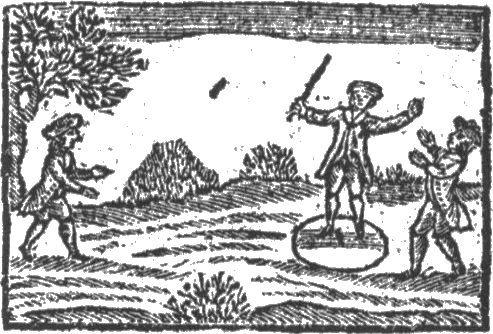
Tip–cat being played. From A Little Pretty Pocket-Book, 1767

Tip-cat (also called cat, cat and dog, one-a-cat, pussy, or piggy) is a pastime which consists of tapping a short billet of wood, usually no more than 3 to 6 inches (8 to 15 cm), with a larger stick similar to a baseball bat or broom handle. The shorter piece is tapered or sharpened on both ends so that it can be "tipped up" into the air when struck by the larger, at which point the player attempts to swing or hit it a distance with the larger stick while it is still in the air (similar to swinging at a pitch in baseball or cricket).

There are many varieties of the game, but in the most common, the batter, having placed the billet, or "cat", in a small circle on the ground, tips it into the air and hits it to a distance. Their opponent then makes an offer of a certain number of points, based upon their estimate of the number of hops or jumps necessary to cover the distance. If the batter thinks the distance is underestimated, they are at liberty to decline the offer and measure the distance in jumps, and to score the number made.

== In popular culture ==
Italo Calvino has written a short story "Making Do" (in English, "Chi si contenta" in Italian), published in the collection Numbers in the Dark and Other Stories in which the only thing left legal for the citizens to do is to play tip-cat (Lippa in the Italian), which they do all day, until even that is forbidden them, too. A variant of the Italian 'lippa' is 'lizza'.

== Variations ==
Variants of the game include:

- Gillidanda in southern Europe and the Indian subcontinent
- Billarda in the Canary Islands
- Lippa in Italian, but the game has a large number of dialectal names too
- Țurca in Romania and Moldavia
- Cead, or cleas na slise in Ireland
- Jachigi in South Korea
- Alak Dolak in Iran.
- Knurr and Spell in West Yorkshire
- Dainty in the Louisville neighborhood of Germantown-Schnitzelburg
- Nipsi in Pennsylvania Dutch communities.
- A version in Walsall, England, in the 1950s, where the cat was struck towards a wicket and could be intercepted by opposing fielders.

== See also ==
- Giddy-gaddy
- British folk sports
- Dandi biyo
