= Gillidanda =

Amateur sport originating from the Indian subcontinent

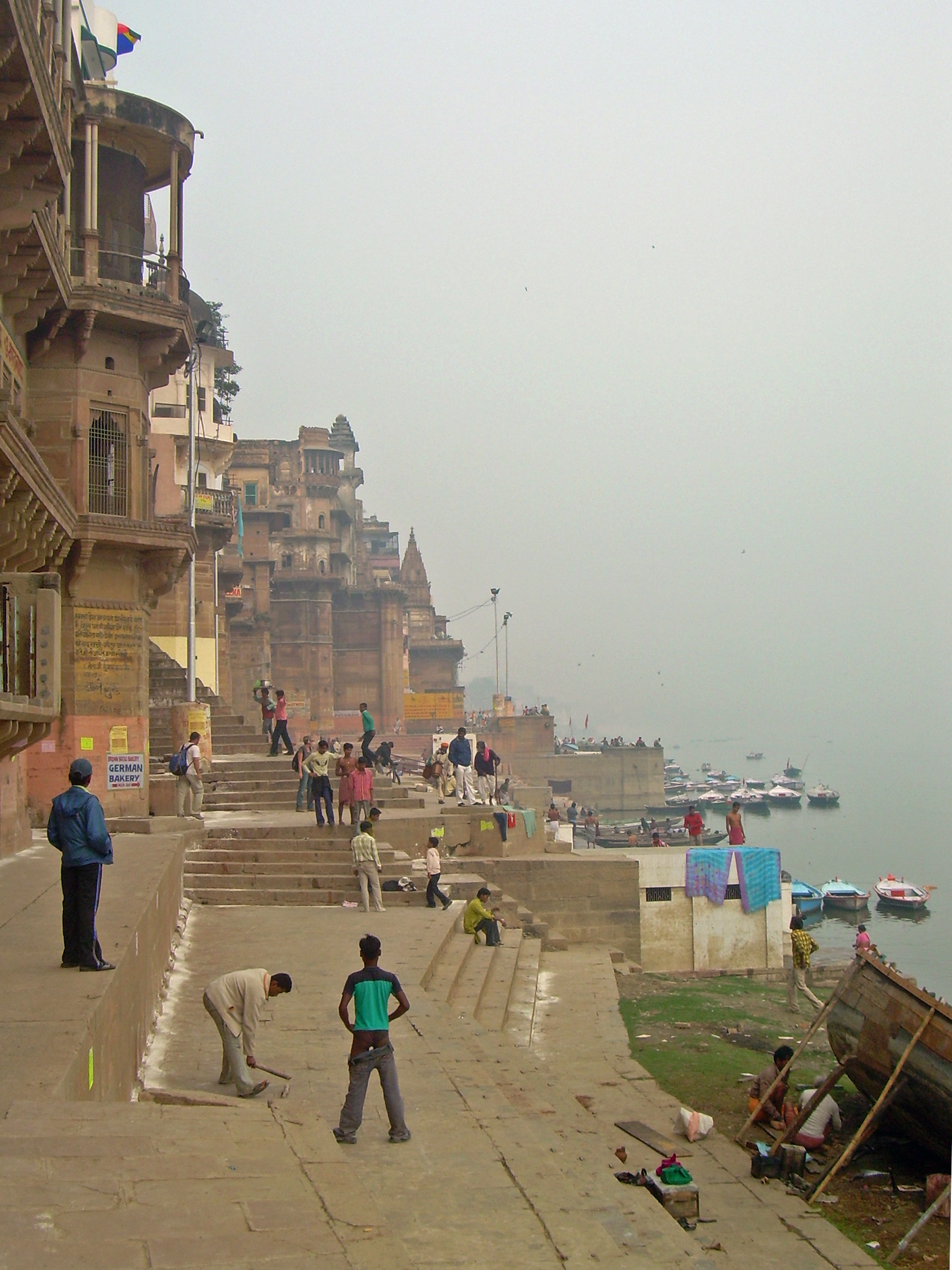
Two boys playing gillidanda on the ghats of the Ganga river in Varanasi, India

Gillidanda (Gilli-Danda, IPA: [ɡɪlːiː ɖəɳɖaː]) is an ancient sport originating from the Indian subcontinent that is still widely played throughout South Asia. The sport is also found as far north as the Mediterranean and as far east as Southeast Asia. It was a precursor to cricket in South Asia. The game is played with two sticks: a large one called a danda, which is used to hit a smaller one, the gilli. It bears many similarities to bat and ball games such as cricket and baseball. Gullidanda is an ancient sport that may date back more than 2,500 years.

== Etymology ==
Gillidanda is known by various other names: Tip-cat in English, Iti-Dakar (اٽي ڏڪر) in Sindhi, guli-badi (ଗୁଲି ବାଡ଼ି) in Odia (regional variations dabalapua ଡାବଲପୁଆ and ପିଲବାଡ଼ି pilabadi in Phulbani and guti-dabula ଗୁଟିଡାବୁଳ in Balasore), gulli-ṭāṇ (𑂏𑂳𑂪𑂹𑂪𑂲 𑂗𑂰𑂝) in Bhojpuri, alak-doulak (الک دولک) in Persian, dānggűli (ডাঙ্গুলি) in Bengali, Tang Guti (টাং গুটি) in Assamese, chinni-kolu ಚಿನ್ನಿ ಕೋಲು in Kannada, kuttiyum kolum in Malayalam, vitti-dandu विट्टी दांडू in Marathi, Koyando-bal(कोयंडो बाल) in Konkani, kitti-pul (கிட்டி-புல்) in Tamil, Gooti-Billa (Andhra Pradesh) or Karra-Billa (Andhra Pradesh) or Billam-Godu (Andhra Pradesh) or chirra-gonay (in Telangana) in Telugu, Gulli-Danda (گُلی ڈنڈا/ਗੁੱਲ਼ੀ ਡੰਡਾ) in Punjabi, Geeti Danna (گیٹی ڈنا) in Saraiki, Ampra kaakay(am pra ka kay) in Pashto, Kon ko in Cambodian, Pathel Lele in Indonesian, syatong in Tagalog, awe petew in Ilonggo, çelikçomak in Turkish, ciang sat in Zomi language, "Đánh Trỏng" or "Đánh Khăng" in Vietnam, Quimbumbia in Cuba and Lippa in Italy.

== History ==
The sport of gillidanda is derived from ghaṭikā, literally "tip-cat". Ghatika is still known to countries Pakistan most famous in Punjab from the Indian subcontinent and south Asian countries like Bangladesh and India. In Bangladesh, it is known as gilli danda while in Nepali, it is known as dandi biyo (डण्डी बियो), which is a similar game. The longer stick in ḍāṅguli khelā should be about 1 1/2 ft (0.46 m) and the shorter stick about 6 in (150 mm). There are certain rules for preparing the sticks and playing the game with them. Gillidanda traces its roots back to ancient India. The game has been played for centuries and holds cultural significance. It was not only a source of recreation but also a way to develop physical agility and coordination among players.

== Rules ==
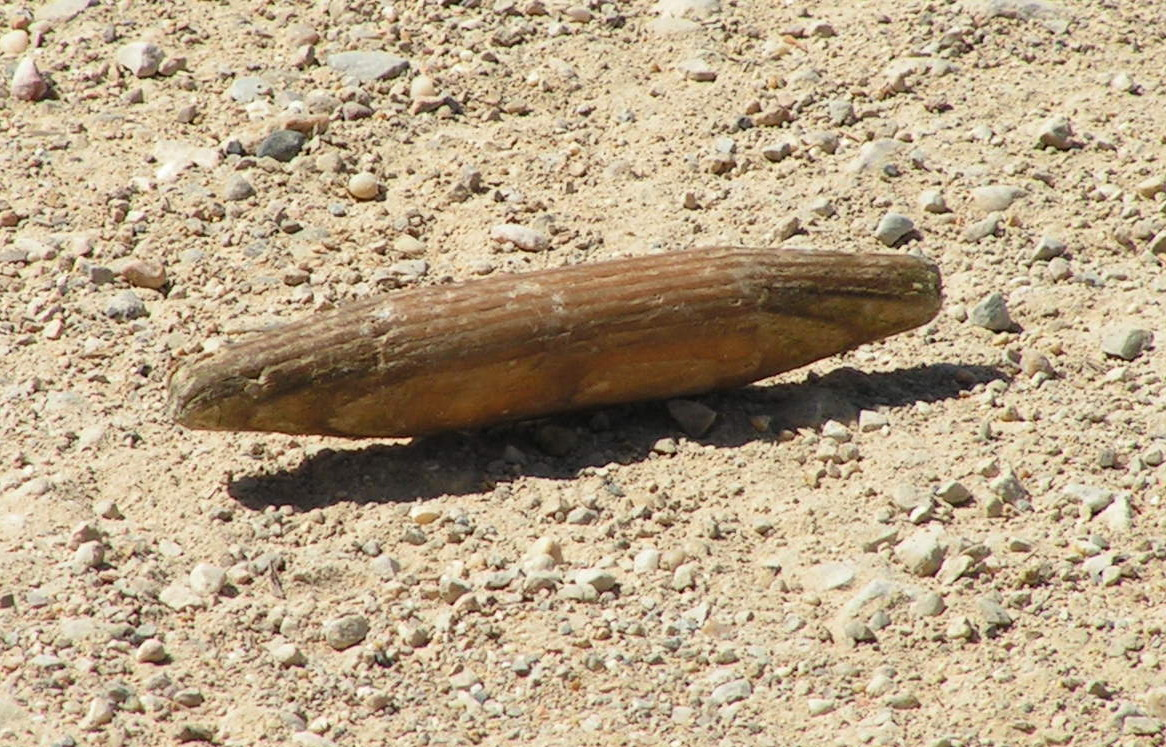
A gilli

Gillidanda is played with two pieces of equipment – a danda, being a long wooden stick, and a gilli, a small oval-shaped piece of wood. It is played with four or more players of even numbers.

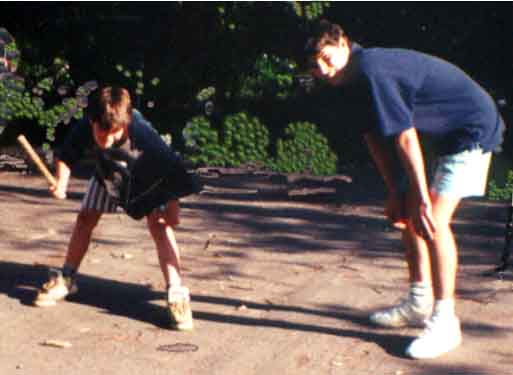
The boy on left is about to strike the gilli with the danda, while the one on right is fielding.

Standing in a small circle, the player balances the gilli on a stone in an inclined manner (somewhat like a see-saw) with one end of the gilli touching the ground while the other end is in the air. The player then uses the danda to hit the gilli at the raised end, which flips it into the air. While it is in the air, the player strikes the gilli, hitting it as far as possible. After striking the gilli, the player is required to run and touch a pre-agreed point outside the circle before an opponent retrieves the gilli.There are no specific dimensions of gillidanda and it does not have a limited number of players.

The gilli becomes airborne after it is struck. If a fielder from the opposing team catches the gilli, the striker is out. If the gilli lands on the ground, the fielder closest to the gilli has one chance to hit the danda (which has to be placed on top of the circle used) with a throw (similar to a run out in cricket). If the fielder is successful, the striker is out; if not, the striker scores one point and gets another opportunity to strike. The team (or individual) with the most points wins the game. If the striker fails to hit the gilli in three tries, the striker is out (similar to a strikeout in baseball). After the gilli has been struck, the opposing players need to return to the circle or, in the best case, catch it in mid-air without it hitting the ground.

== Variations ==
As an amateur youth sport, gilli danda has many regional variations. In some versions, the number of points a striker score depends on the distance the gilli falls from the striking point. The distance is measured in terms of the length of the danda, or in some cases the length of the gilli. Scoring also depends on how many times the gilli was hit in the air in one strike. If it travels a certain distance with two mid-air strikes, the total points are doubled. If the gilli is not struck far enough the player has to pick it up and try again.

The UNESCO Advisory Committee and the International Council of Traditional Sports and Games (ICTSG) are keen to revive and promote all such traditional sports which are almost dying throughout the world.

In one variation, the striker hits the gilli and when the gilli flies and lands at a distance (short or far), the striker then tells the bowler how much the distance is between where he is standing and where the gillis has fallen, i.e. how many lengths of danda. It is a guess of course, but mostly correct. The bowler or thrower either accepts the score or can measure the length himself. If a wrong score is found by measuring, striker is out.

== Similar games ==
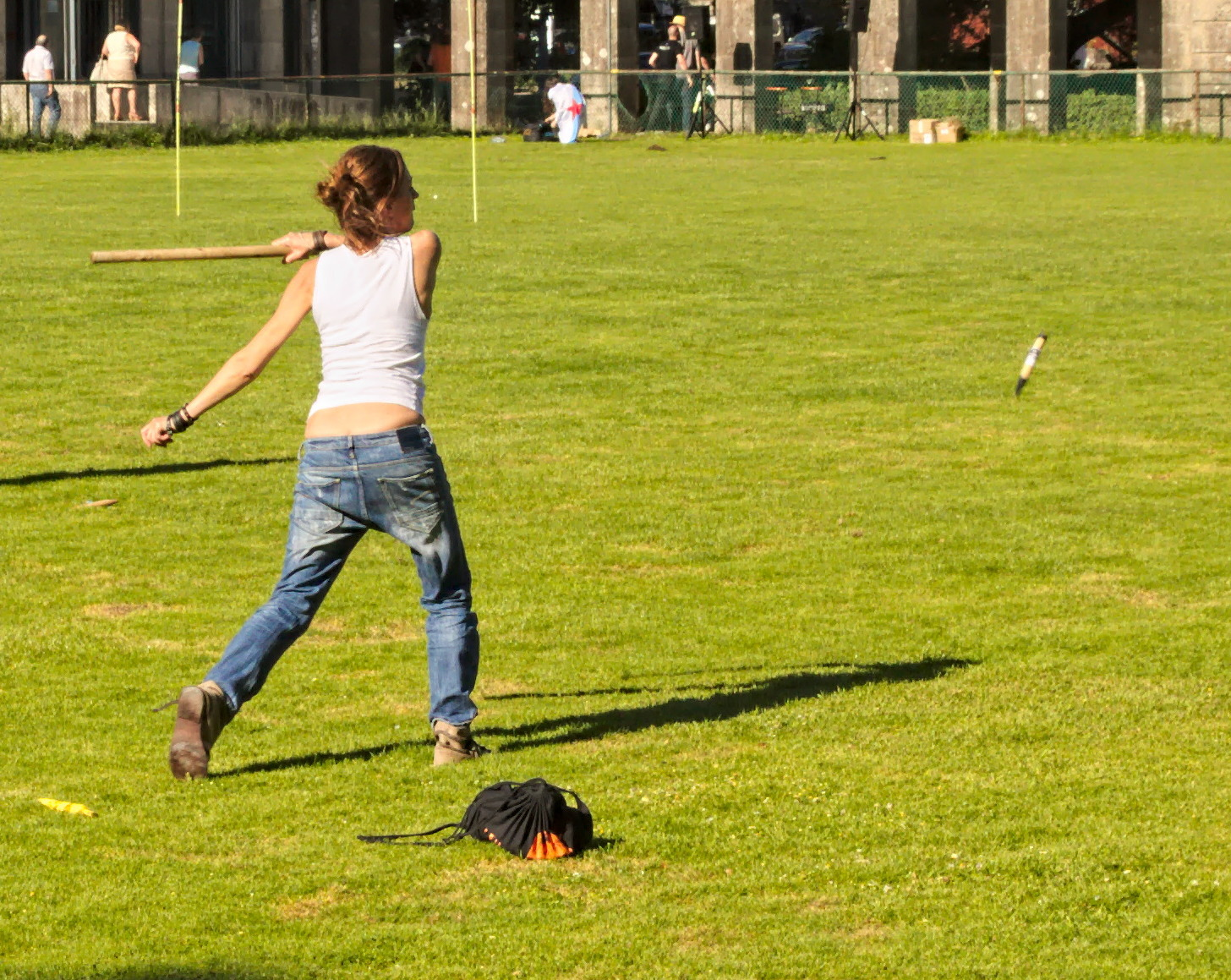
A game of billarda in Galicia, Spain

- In Iran, a similar game is called Alak dolak (الک دلک) or Aluch Aghach (ألوچ آقاچ) by Persians and Turks, respectively.
- In Azerbaijan, a similar game is called Çilingağac (Chilingaghaj).
- In Galicia, a similar game is called billarda.
- In Catalonia and the Valencian Community, a similar game is called bòlit.
- In Philippines, a game known as syatong or pati-kubra (in Morong, Rizal) is similar to gillidanda.
- In Italy, a similar game known as Lippa, Lipe, Tirolo, or S-cianco is shown in the movie Watch Out, We're Mad!
- In Croatia, an old children's shepherds' game called Pikuća has rules that are almost identical to those of Gillidanda.
- In the United States, a similar game is called pee-wee, which figures in Chapter 3 of Part One of John Steinbeck's East of Eden (1952).
- Dainty is a street ball game played in Schnitzelburg, Louisville in the United States.
- In England, a similar game was called tip-cat, giddy-gaddy and cat's pallet.
- In Poland, a similar game is known, called Klipa.
- In Malaysia, a similar game is known as konda kondi.
- In Norway, a similar game is known as vippe pinne.
- In Romania, a similar game is known as țurcă.
- In Russia, a similar game is known as chizhik (чижик).
- In Ukraine, a similar game is known as chizhik (чижик) as well with sports colours being black.
- In Slovenia, a similar game is known as pandolo.
- In Mexico, the game is known as charangay or changais.
- In Cuba, the game is known as Quimbumbia.
- In Newfoundland, a similar traditional children's game is known as Tiddly or Piddly.
- In Ireland, a variation of the game is called Cead (pronounced "Kyad") and is traditionally played exclusively on one day a year, St. Patrick's Day (17th March), on the island of Inishmaan (Inis Meáin) on the Atlantic coastline of Galway.
- Among the Abenaki people of Canada and the United States, there is a game called Moineau.
- In Nepal, a similar game is known as Dandibiyo.

== In popular culture ==
The 2014 Marathi sport/drama movie Vitti Dandu was made on the same sport.

The Bollywood movie Lagaan mentions the traditional youth sport of gillidanda as being similar to cricket.

The 2021 Nepali movie Damaru Ko Dandibiyo starring Khagendra Lamichhane portrays an underdog team winning the gillidanda league in the hills of Nepal.

The Hindi writer Premchand wrote a short story named "Gilli-danda" in which he compares old simple times and emotions to modern values and also hints at caste inequalities in India. The protagonist and narrator of the story recounts his inability to play gilli-danda well in his youth. He remembers a friend who could control the gilli as he wished. He goes away and comes back as an adult and a government officer. He searches for his old friend and finds him – he is very poor and says, "Where do we get the time?" when asked by the protagonist whether he plays gilli-danda. The protagonist convinces him to play – he cheats at every opportunity, but his friend meekly submits, even though he would not have let him get away with such deceit in his youth. After being defeated, the friend invites him to a gilli-danda match the next day. The protagonist is shocked when he sees his friend play just as well as before and realises that he had indulged him because he knew that he had forgotten the basics of gilli-danda. The protagonist feels very small and goes back to the city humiliated.

The 1934 Laurel & Hardy film Babes in Toyland features Laurel playing the US version of the game, which he refers to as "Pee Wee."

== See also ==
- Backyard cricket
- Pittu Garam, also known as Pithu Fod or simply Pithu
- Kho Kho
- Paandi
