= Bat and trap =

English pub game

Bat and trap is an English bat-and-ball pub game. The game has its origins from the early 14th century and existed in its modern form by 1825. It is still played in Kent, and occasionally in Brighton.

There are several active leagues in Kent and local trophy competitions such as between The Handsome Sam and The Brickfield pubs. The Brickfield has Bat & Trap set up in their garden.

By the late 20th century it was usually only played on Good Friday in Brighton, on the park called The Level, which has an adjacent pub called The Bat and Ball, whose sign depicts the game. Brighton & Hove City Council started a Bat and Trap club based at The Level in 2013, as part of the Activities Plan associated with a £2.2m Heritage Lottery Fund and Big Lottery Fund-funded restoration of the park.

== Rules ==
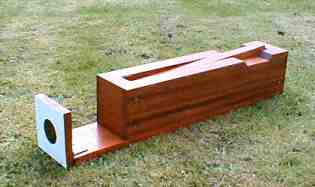
Trap used in bat and trap

The game is played between two teams of up to eight players. At any one time, one team is batting and the other is bowling. The game involves placing a heavy solid-rubber ball, similar to a lacrosse ball, on one end of a "trap", which is a low wooden box 22 inches (560 mm) long, 5 inches wide, and 5 inches (130 mm) high, on top of which is a simple see-saw mechanism. Each player in turn on the batting side hits the opposite end of the see-saw lever (the "striker") with their bat, so as to propel the ball into the air, and then, using the same bat, attempts to hit the ball between two 7-foot (2.1 m) high posts situated 21 yards (19 m) away and 13 feet 6 inches (4.11 m) apart at the other end of the playing area, or "pitch".

The bowling side stand behind and between the posts. If any of them catches the ball before it hits the ground the batsman is out. The batsman is also out if he or she fails to hit the ball between the posts at a height not exceeding 7 feet (2.1 m). After each successful hit, one fielder (the one whose turn it is to bowl next), returns the ball to the batting end by hurling, tossing, or bowling it back towards the trap, attached to the front of which is a 5-inch (130 mm) square target, or "wicket", hinged at the bottom. If the bowler hits the wicket with the ball so as to knock it flat, the batsman is "bowled out". If the bowler does not succeed, the batsman scores one run and continues to play. Once all the members of the first batting team are out, the batting and bowling teams change places and the game continues until all players on both sides have batted.

== American version ==
In the American rules of bat and trap, there are several differences in the equipment and game mechanics as well as the layout of the pitch. Each team is limited to 4 players. The trap is 6 inches by 6 inches, and it has a yellow background with a black "X" mark across the front. The posts are 1–2 feet high. There are two additional lines, one of which extends across the field at a right angle 10 yards in front of the trap; this line is the "foul line". Balls put into play must not touch the ground prior to hitting this line or the batter is called out. In addition, there is an additional line 5 yards behind the posts; this line is known as the "back line", and fair hit balls that cross the line, either before touching a fielder or after, or on the ground or in the air but below the imaginary line demarcating the fair zone, score four runs for the batting side. This is known as a "four", and the fielding team does not have the opportunity to roll out the batter following a four. Since the posts are only 1–2 feet, the top of the fair hit zone is demarcated by an imaginary line running from the top of the tallest fielding player's head. Batted balls that travel above this imaginary line are automatically out.

== See also ==
- Knurr and spell
- Tip-cat
- Origins of baseball
- Pub games
- Stoolball
