= Dandi biyo =

Nepali stick game

Dandi biyo being played

Dandi biyo (Nepali: डन्डी बियो, pronounced [ˈɖʌɳɖi ˈbijo]) is a game played in Nepal which was considered the de facto national game until 23 May 2017, when volleyball was declared as the national sport. Dandi biyo is played with a stick (dandi) about 2 feet (61 cm) long and a wooden pin (biyo) about 6 inches (15 cm) long. The pin is a small wooden stick with pointed ends. The game is similar to the Indian game gilli danda. The government has not implemented any policies for the preservation of dandi biyo, and with decreasing players the game is expected to be extinct soon.

== Gameplay ==
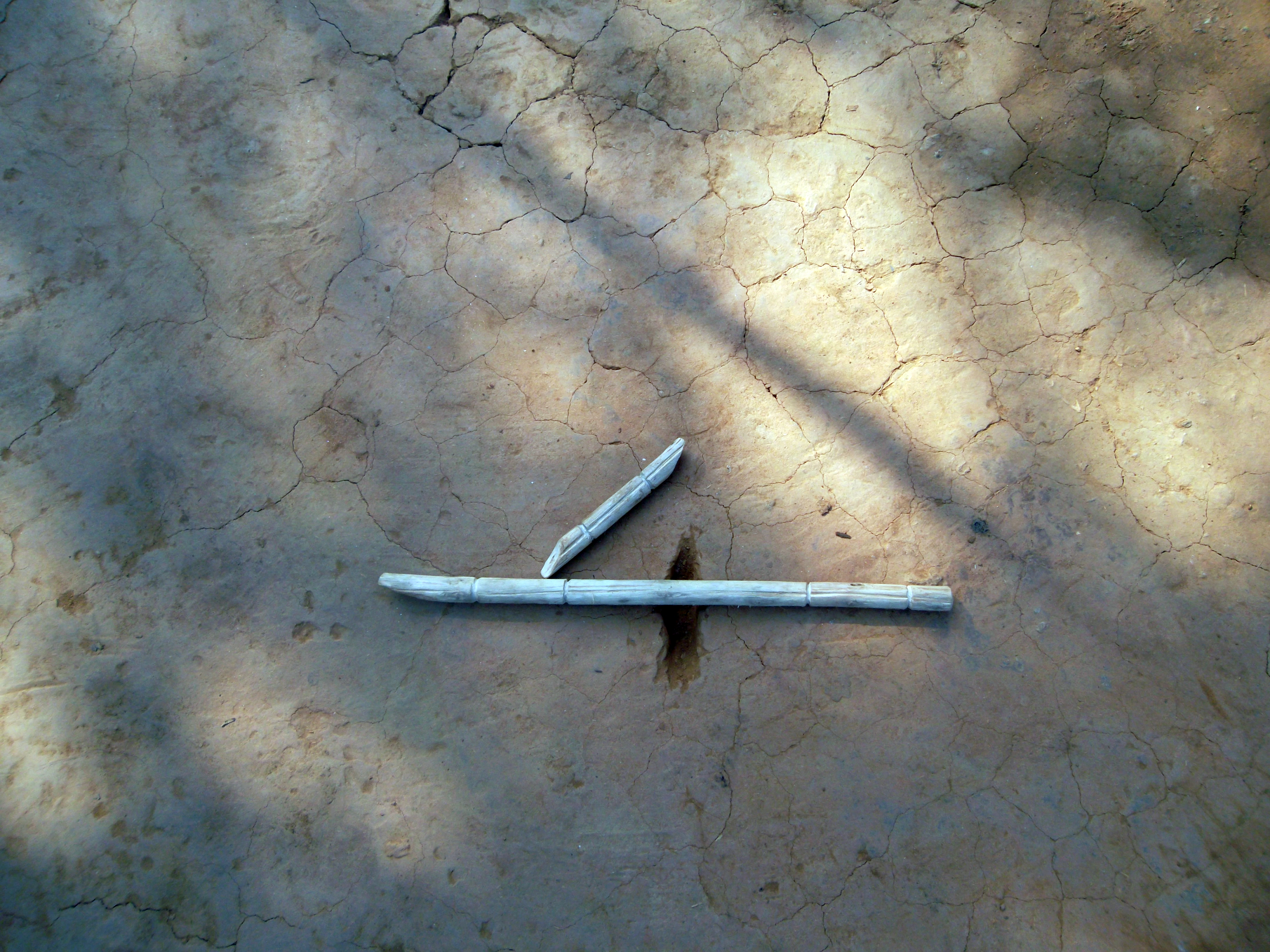
Biyo and dandi

Dandi biyo is played by two or more players. The wooden pin is laid across a four-inch (10 cm) deep hole in the ground. One player puts one end of the stick inside the hole and holds the other end. The player jerks the stick against the pin to launch the pin into the air while other players called 'fielders' try to catch the pin. If one of the fielders catch the pin in the air, the turn is over and the catcher takes the stick. If the pin instead hits the ground, that player plays to score. One of the fielders then throws the pin into the hole while the player tries to hit and throw the pin away. If the pin goes into the hole, the player's turn is over and the points accumulated by the player automatically becomes zero. If the pin does not go into the hole, the player plays to score by hitting the pin at one end by the stick.

In another version of the game, a circular boundary of about one-meter diameter is drawn on the ground. The player throws the pin into the circle from a distance of about two meters. If the pin lies within the circle the player continues to play and score. To score, a player again knocks the pin in the air. Before it lands, the player hits it as many times as possible, to move it away from the hole. This process is repeated three times in which the player tries to throw the pin as far as he can. The score is calculated by multiplying the number of hits by the number of stick lengths the pin travelled. If the player hits the pin twice in the air, the score will be twice the number of stick lengths the pin travelled.

The game was mostly played by Nepali youths and was very popular between the 1980s and 1990s when modern toys and games were not available.

Dandi biyo is one of many such games that were locally developed in rural areas reflecting use of local tools and techniques. In the context of modern games, dandi biyo is close to cricket. The player can be compared to the "batsman" and the other players to the "fielders".

The Dandi Biyo Association was established about two decades ago as the sport's governing body. A dandi biyo event happens every year on the occasion of Public Service Day, which falls in the first week of September.

Tip-cat is a similar British game, and gillidanda is a similar Indian game.

== See also ==
- Tip-cat
- Gillidanda
- Chungi
