= Knurr and spell =

Old English pub game

Knurr and spell (also called Northern spell, nipsy or trap ball) is an old Northern English game, once popular as a pub game.

== History ==
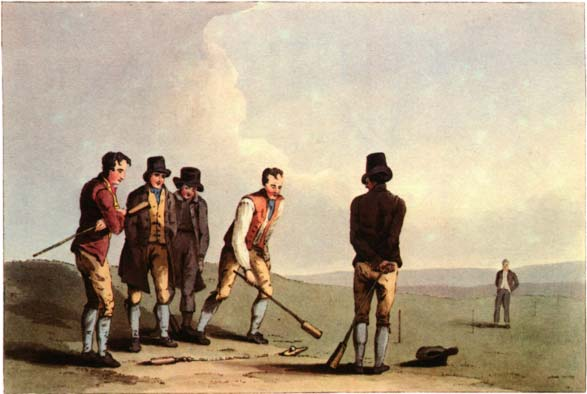
Yorkshiremen playing knurr and spell, ca. 1814.

The game originated in the moors of Yorkshire, in England, but then spread throughout the north of England. Related games can be traced back to the 14th century. It was especially popular in the 18th and 19th centuries, but was virtually unknown by the 21st century, though there was a local revival in the 1970s. As late as the 1930s exhibition games of knur and spell by veterans drew large crowds to the Rusland Valley in North Lancashire, according to the chronicles of the North-West Evening Mail, but even then it was regarded as an archaic game.

The World Championship featured in a 1972 broadcast of BBC Nationwide. The competition featured three teams from Greetland, Barnsley and Colne and was played on the moors near Greetland. The film shows the decline in the use of the spell, with the ball (knurr) held in place in a sling.

An earlier British Pathe film from 1933 shows greater use of the Spell, with close-up of the mechanism.

The 1971 Champion was Selwyn Schofield from Greetland and the 1972 Champion was Len Kershaw from Colne.

Transworld Sport showed the sport more recently, showing a more elderly Len Kershaw. It suggested a common origin in the Swiss game Hornussen.

The world record is 304 yards, recorded in 1899.

A man from Golcar, West Yorkshire was recorded in 1974 for the Survey of English Dialects discussing knurr and spell being played around the turn of the twentieth century.

== Etymology ==
Knurr (from Middle English: knurre, knot) refers to a hardwood or pottery ball, as could be made from a knot of wood. Spell (from Danish: spil, spindle) is the stick of wood used to strike it.

The game around Barnsley was known as "potty knocking".

== Equipment and play ==
In Yorkshire it is played with a levered wooden trap known as a spell, by means of which the knurr, about the size of a walnut, is thrown into the air. In Lancashire the knurr is suspended stationary from string. The knurr is struck by the player with the stick. The object of the game is to hit the knurr the greatest possible distance, either in one or several hits. Each player competes as an individual, without interference, and any number can enter a competition.

The stick is a bat consisting of two parts: a 4 feet (1.2 m) long stick made of ash or lancewood; and a pommel, a piece of very hard wood about 6 inches (150 mm) long, 4 inches (100 mm) wide and 1 inch (25 mm) thick. This was swung in both hands, although shorter bats for one hand were sometimes used. A successful hit drives the ball about 200 yards (180 m). The stroke is made by a full swing round the head, not unlike a drive in golf.

Originally the ball was thrown into the air by striking a lever upon which it rested in the spell or trap, but in the later development of the game a spell or trap furnished with a spring was introduced, thus ensuring regularity in the height to which the knurr is tossed, somewhat after the manner of the shooter's clay pigeon. By means of a thumb screw, the player can adjust the spring of the spell or trap according to the velocity of release desired for the ball.

On a large moor, where the game is generally played, the ground is marked out with wooden pins driven in every 20 yards (18 m). In matches each player supplies their own knurrs and spells and has five rises of the ball to a game.

== See also ==
- Bat and trap
- Tip-cat
- Origins of baseball
- Pub games
- Stoolball
