= Kuttiyum kolum =

Indian stick game

An illustration of the game

Kuttiyum kolum (English: stick and cane) is a traditional game played in Kerala, India. It is similar to an ancient game found all over the Indian subcontinent with different names, such as Gilli-danda in North India. A similar game by the name of Lippa has been played in Italy. Kuttiyum kolum possibly originated over 2500 years ago.
