= Chungi =

Nepalese and northeast Indian children's game

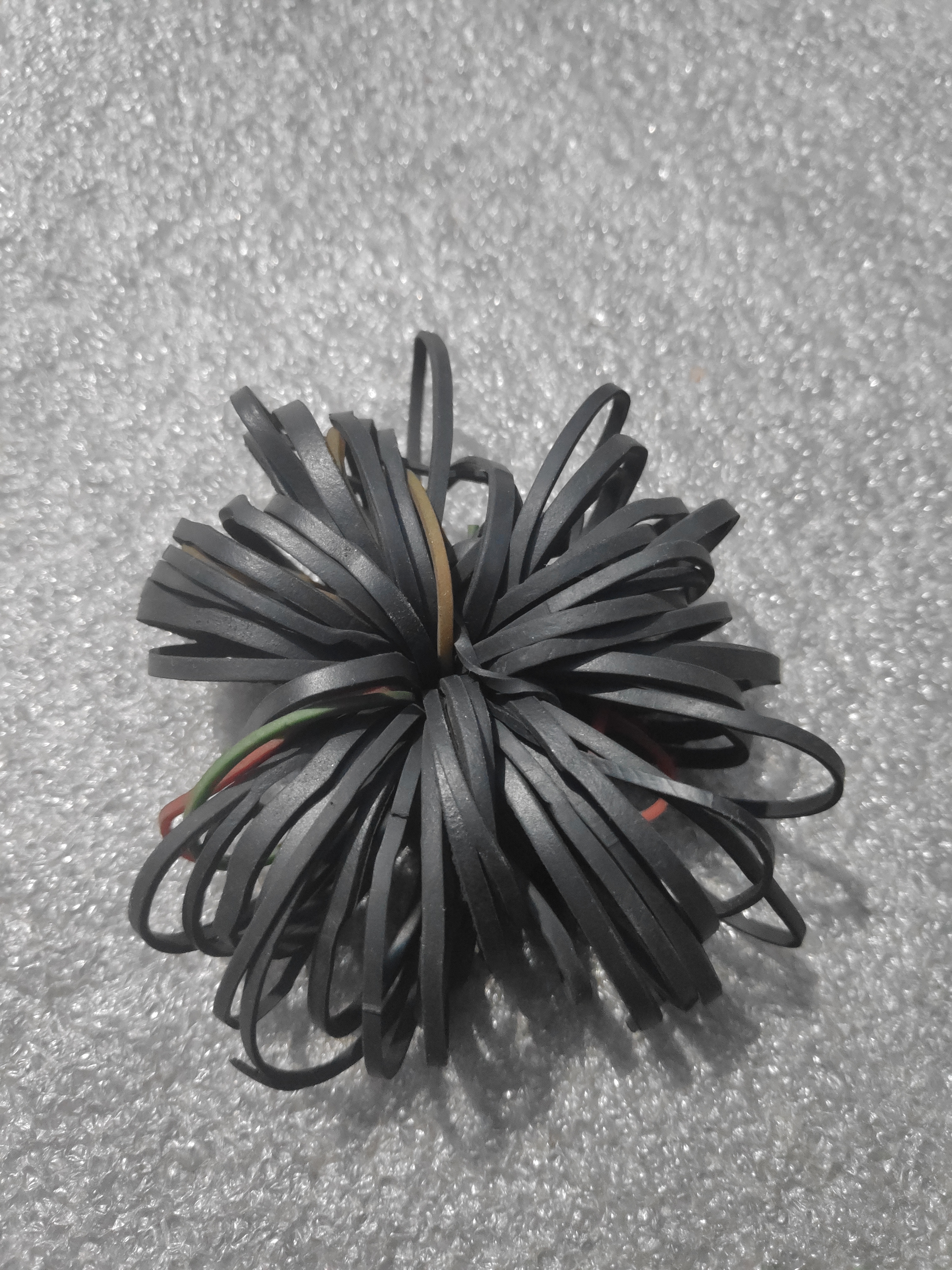
Chungi ball

Chungi (Nepali: चुङ्गि) is a traditional game played by children in Nepal and northeastern India. The setup of the game is similar to hacky sack. It is played with a ball made by tying a group of rubber bands in the middle.

== Gameplay ==
The rules of the game vary by region. The traditional way to play chungi is by counting the number of times the ball can be hit using feet without dropping to the ground. The use of both feet is allowed, but using any other body part is not. Generally, a target count is decided for the game finish. At the end of the count, a back kick is done to the ball to hit it as far as possible. The ball should be far enough from the previously decided distance, this being measured by the feet of the player. If the player cannot hit the ball, another player gets a chance to continue.

Another type of game that can be played is passing the ball to other players by foot, without letting it drop to the ground.

== Impact ==
Chungi is considered one of the reasons for the decrease in popularity of Dandi Biyo, another traditional Nepalese game.

The game has also been used to teach children mathematics and other concepts in school.
