= Stoolball =

Paddle sport from Sussex, England

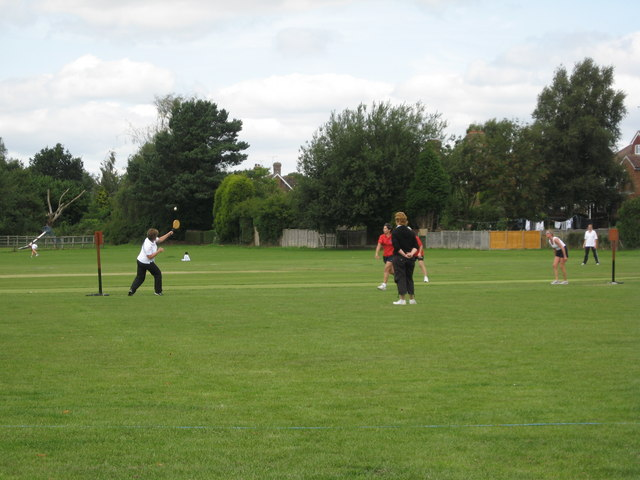
- Ladies Stoolball Team, 2009
- Highest governing body: Stoolball England
- Nicknames: "cricket in the air" "bittle-battle"
- First played: 1500; 526 years ago Sussex, England; First rules established: 1867; 159 years ago

Characteristics
- Type: Ladies-only or mixed

Presence
- Country or region: Sussex, Kent, Surrey, Midlands
- World Games: No

Stoolball is a sport that dates back to at least the 15th century, originating in Sussex, southern England. It is considered a "traditional striking and fielding sport" and may be an ancestor of cricket (a game it resembles in some respects), baseball, softball, and rounders. The sport has been called "cricket in the air". There is evidence to suggest that it was played as a tradition by milkmaids who used their milking stools as a "wicket" and the bittle, or milk bowl as a bat, hence its archaic name of bittle-battle.

The sport of stoolball is strongly associated with Sussex and has been referred to as Sussex's 'national' sport and a Sussex game or pastime. The National Stoolball Association was formed in 1979 to promote and expand stoolball. The game was officially recognised as a sport by the Sports Council in early 2008. The National Stoolball Association changed its name to Stoolball England in 2010 on the advice of the Sports Council and was recognised as the national governing body for stoolball in England in 2011. The organisation is recognised by Sport England.

The game's popularity has faded since the 1960s, but it continues to be played at a local league level in Sussex, Kent, Surrey and the Midlands. Some variants are played in some schools. Teams can be ladies only or mixed. There are ladies' leagues in Sussex, Surrey and Kent and mixed leagues in Sussex.

== History ==
=== Medieval and Tudor references ===
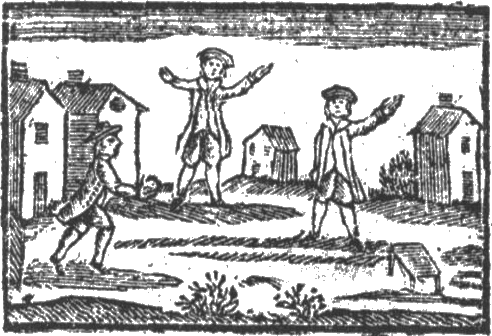
1767 Illustration of Stoolball in the children's book A Little Pretty Pocket-Book

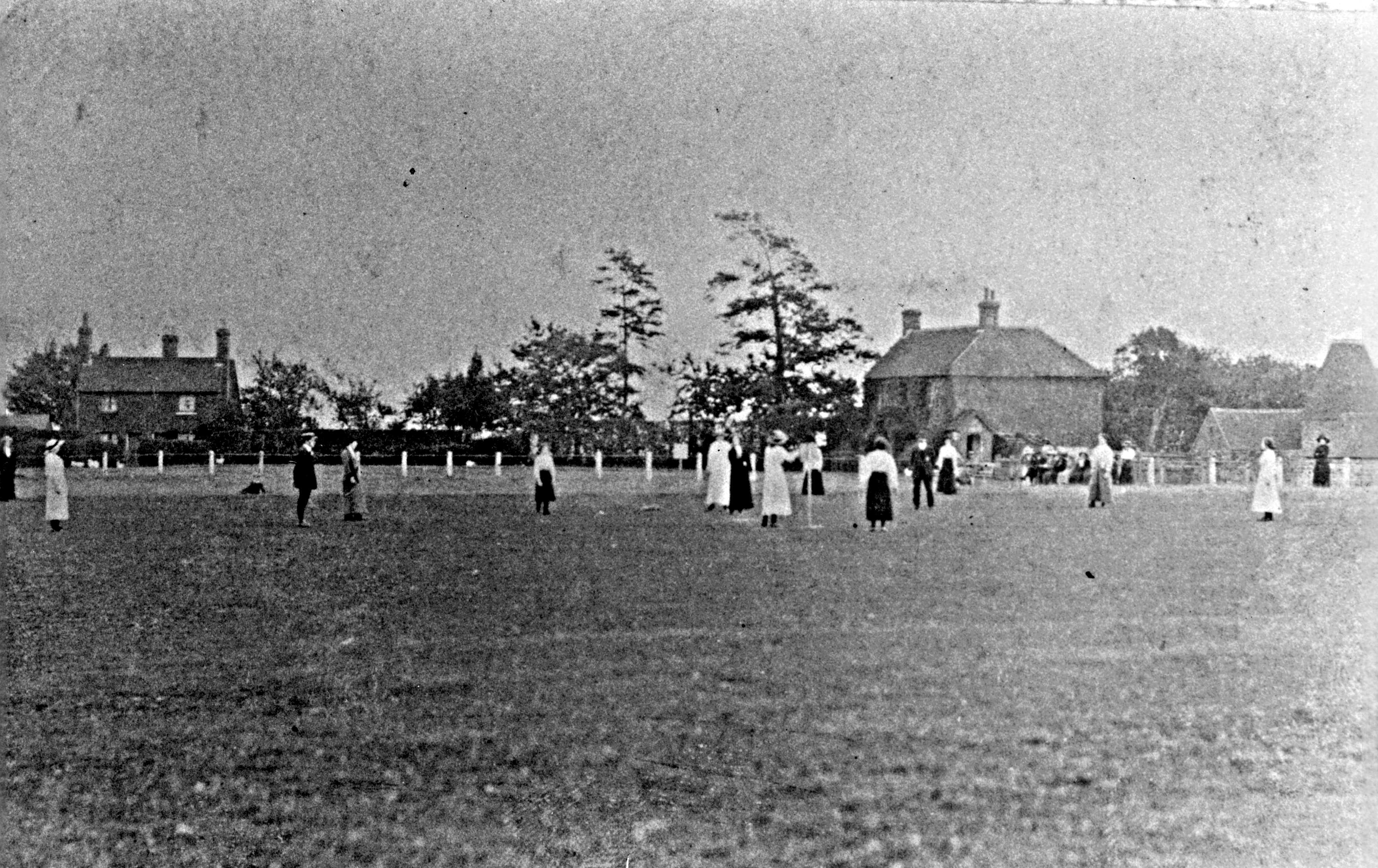
Stoolball game in 1902 in Nutley, East Sussex

Stoolball is attested by name as early as 1450. Nearly all medieval references describe it as a game played during Easter celebrations, typically as a courtship pastime rather than a competitive game. The game's associations with romance remained strong into the modern period. Written by William Shakespeare and the Sussex-born playwright John Fletcher, the comedy, The Two Noble Kinsmen used the phrase "playing stool ball" as a euphemism for sexual behaviour.

=== Early competitions and establishment of codes ===
Stoolball makes an appearance in the dictionary of Samuel Johnson, where it is defined as a game played by driving a ball from stool to stool.

Stoolball seems to have been one of the earliest sports in which women participated. Activities for women before about 1870 were recreational rather than sport-specific in nature. They were typically non-competitive, informal, rule-less; they emphasised physical activity rather than competition. In contrast, stoolball allowed women to participate in competitive sport.

A "fine match of stoolball" is recorded as having been played in June 1747 by a total of 28 women at Warbleton. The first inter-county stoolball match took place between the women of Sussex and Kent in 1797 at Tunbridge Wells Common on the historic border between the two counties. Sussex women wore blue ribbons to represent the county while the women of Kent wore pink ribbons.

Sussex historian Andrew Lusted has argued that between 1866 and 1887 the Glynde Butterflies stoolball team were the first women in England to be considered sports stars. In 1866 the first recorded stoolball match took place between teams of named women representing villages as the Glynde Butterflies took on the Firle Blues. Other teams included the Chailey Grasshoppers, Selmeston Harvest Bugs, Waldron Bees, Eastbourne Seagulls, Danny Daisies and Westmeston.

The sport's modern rules were codified at Glynde in 1881 where the two slightly different sets of rules in the east and the west of Sussex were brought together. In 1867 the rules in the east of the county were compiled by the Rev William de St Croix, the vicar of Glynde, and were the first rules to be established.

=== 20th century revival ===
A Sussex Stoolball League was established in 1903. Initially played by women only, men joined in shortly afterwards. Modern stoolball is centred on Sussex where the game was revived in the early 20th century by Major William Grantham. Grantham wore a traditional Sussex round frock and beaver hat to stoolball games. In 1917, Sussex County Cricket Ground in Hove hosted a match between young men who had lost one arm in First World War action at a temporary hospital in Brighton's Royal Pavilion, "damaged by wounds", and a team of older lawyers, "damaged by age". The soldiers won and were deemed to be 'heroes'. In 1919 a demonstration match was held at Lord's and the game was also played near the trenches of the battlefields of the First World War.

First played in 1923, the League Championship Challenge Cup is open to the winning teams of the five leagues of the Sussex County Stoolball Association - North, East, West, Mid and Central. By the 1930s stoolball was being played in the Midlands and the north of England. Since 1938 Sussex and Kent have competed annually for the Rose Bowl, which was presented to Sussex by Major William Grantham. This is sometimes a team representing Sussex and sometimes one of Sussex's five leagues may represent the county against Kent. Grantham founded the Stoolball Association of Great Britain at Lord's in 1923. By 1927 over 1,000 clubs were playing stoolball across England, however in 1942 the Stoolball Association of Great Britain ceased to function. The National Stoolball Association was founded on 3 October 1979 at Clair Hall in Haywards Heath attended by 23 people from nine different leagues. On the advice of the Sports Council the governing body was renamed Stoolball England in 2010.

In the early 20th century stoolball was also played outside England, including in France, Japan and Ceylon (now Sri Lanka).

== Description and rules ==
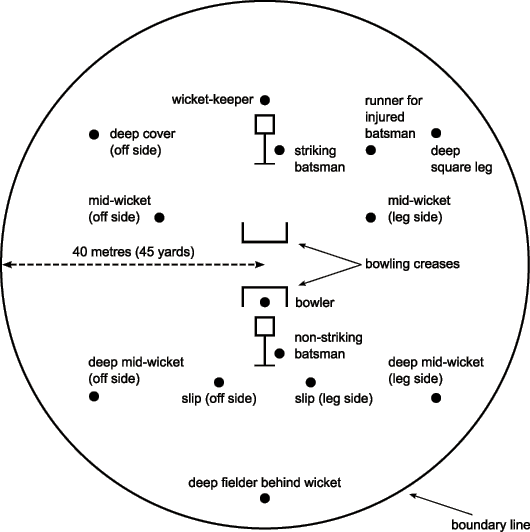
Stoolball field and positioning

Dimension of the pitch

Stoolball is played on grass with a 90-yard (82-metre) diameter boundary, and the pitch is 16 yards (15 metres) long. Each team consists of 11 players, with one team fielding and the other batting. Bowling is underarm from a bowling "crease" 10 yards (9.1 metres) from the batter's wicket, with the ball reaching the batter on the full as in rounders or baseball rather than bouncing from the pitch as in cricket. Each over consists of 8 balls. The "wicket" itself is a square piece of wood at head or shoulder height fastened to a post. Traditionally this was the seat of a stool hung from a post or tree; some versions used a tall stool placed upright on the ground.

As it is played today, a bowler attempts to hit the wicket with the ball, and a batter defends it using a bat shaped like a frying pan. The batter scores "runs" by running between the wickets or hitting the ball beyond the boundary in a similar way to cricket. A ball hit over the boundary counts for 4 runs if it has hit the ground before reaching the boundary, or 6 runs if it landed beyond the boundary upon first contact with the ground. Fielders attempt to catch the ball or run out the batter by hitting the wicket with the ball before the batter returns from her or his run.

Originally the batter simply had to defend her or his stool from each ball with a hand and would score a point for each delivery until the stool was hit. The game later evolved to include runs and bats.

== Confusion with the game of Stoball ==
According to Alice Gomme, early records have shown that the game was called Stobball or Stoball and was a game peculiar to North Wiltshire, North Gloucestershire, and a little part of Somerset, near Bath. However, although the 17th-century antiquarian John Aubrey described a game called "stobball" played in this area, his description of it does not appear to be stoolball. Another contemporary text from the same region characterises "stoball" as a game played mainly by men and boys.

The Oxford English Dictionary considers it unlikely that "stool ball" could have been corrupted into "stobball". Stobball could very well instead be the game Willughby called "stow-ball," which resembled golf.

== See also ==
- Bat and trap
- Cricket
- Origins of baseball
- Pub games
- Rounders
- Trap-ball

== Bibliography ==
- Coates, Richard (2010). The Traditional Dialect of Sussex. Pomegranate Press. ISBN 978-1-907242-09-0.
- Collins, Tony, ed. (2005). Encyclopedia of Traditional British Rural Sports. Routledge. ISBN 978-0415352246.
- Gomme, Alice Bertha (1894). The traditional games of England, Scotland and Ireland: with tunes, singing rhymes and methods of playing according to the variants extant and recorded in different parts of the kingdom. London: David Nutt.
- Locke, Tim (2011). Slow Sussex and the South Downs. Buckinghamshire: Bradt Travel Guides. ISBN 9781841623436.
- Nauright, John (2012). Sports Around the World: History, Culture, and Practice. ABC-CLIO. ISBN 978-1598843002.
