= Jachigi =

Korean stick game

Jachigi (Korean: 자치기) is a South Korean game where a long stick and two short sticks is hit and caught. First, a circular hole is dug on the ground, and a circle is drawn on the outside. After placing a short stick around the outside of the hole, it is hit with the long stick, and the rebounding stick (the short one that was just hit), is hit again with the long stick in mid-air, sending it flying far away.

== History ==
Jachigi is said to have originated from the game called gyeokgu, a popular sport in ancient Goryeo used for military purposes. It involved two teams holding sticks, which were used to shoot a ball in between two goal posts set up in the middle of a gyeokgu field. The game resembled the modern-day field hockey sport especially as it was also played on horseback. It was, however, included in the military service examination and training in the Joseon period. The advent of modern warfare, particularly after Joseon's war with Japan, made the gyeokgu irrelevant in armed combat and from then on, it transformed into simpler forms and spread across Korea as popular children's games. It was the basis of the shuttlecock-kicking game and the jachigi. The jachigi game denotes measuring with a stick and hitting. Ja means wooden stick, while chigi means measuring distance. To play effectively, the stick should be about 30 centimeters long and the shorter stick must be 7 centimeters.

== How to play ==
The rules are to first divide two or more people into two teams, either the offensive area or the defensive area. The offensive side hits the stick and lets it fly; if the opposing team catches it, the offense and the defense switch sides. If there were only two people playing, the player who hit the stick would lose. In the case that it could not be caught, the opposing team picks up the short stick, and throws it toward the hole. Then, the offensive person hits it back. Where the short stick fell, they measure with the long stick. Right then, the long stick becomes one ruler. The name jachigi is used because of the use of the long stick as a ruler to determine the winner. The longer the distance measured, the higher the score.
