= Giddy-gaddy =

Children's game played in Manchester, England

Giddy-gaddy, also known as cat's pallet, was a children's game played in Manchester, England, almost certainly a variation on tip-cat. It involved "striking one end of a sharpened piece of wood causing it to rise and then driving it some distance with a stick"; the object was to hit it as far as possible. The name "giddy-gaddy" for the game appears only in the court leet records of the manor of Manchester, an indication of the disruption and damage it caused in the streets of industrial areas such as Ardwick.
