= Alak dolak =

Iranian stick game

Alak dolak is a traditional Iranian game played between two teams of equal size. It is played in Iran, Afghanistan and in surrounding countries.

== Rules ==
In alak dolak, a wooden peg, the dolak, is placed on two bricks lying on the ground parallel to each other. A bigger stick, called an alak, is held in between the dolak and the ground.

The alak is then thrust upward by the player so that the dolak goes flying. The player then tries to hit ("اصابت") the dolak while it is airborne. If the player misses the dolak, they will reset the dolak on the bricks and try again. When they do manage to hit it, the players of the opposing team will try to catch the dolak. If the opposing team catches the dolak, the player who hit it is out, and the next person takes the alak to begin their turn.

== Sources ==
- http://www.iranicaonline.org/articles/alak-dolak-the-game-of-tipcat-played-for-centuries-in-iran-afghanistan-and-surrounding-countries
- http://www.iranian.com/Arts/1999/June/Alakdolak/index.html
- https://web.archive.org/web/20120314191224/http://www.o-sport.info/sport-for-all/alak-dolak.htm
