= Rounders =

Bat-and-ball team sport originating in England

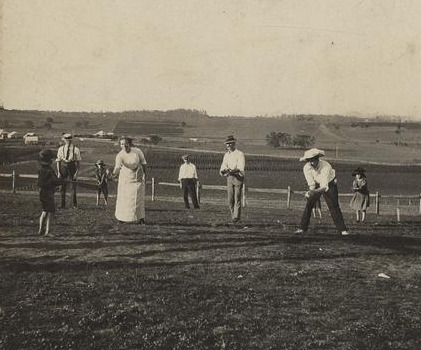
- A game of rounders on Christmas Day at Baroona, Glamorgan Vale, Australia in 1913
- Highest governing body: Rounders England (England), GAA Rounders (Ireland), a division of the Gaelic Athletic Association
- First played: Great Britain and Ireland, 1500s (unified rules 1884)

Characteristics
- Team members: 2 teams of 6–15

Rounders is a bat-and-ball game played between two teams. Rounders is a batting and fielding team game that involves hitting a small, hard, leather-cased ball with a wooden, plastic, or metal bat that has a cylindrical end. The players score by running around the four bases on the field.

Played in England since Tudor times, it is referenced in 1744 in the children's book A Little Pretty Pocket-Book where it was called Base-Ball. The name baseball was superseded by the name rounders in England, while other modifications of the game played elsewhere retained the name baseball. The game is popular among British and Irish school children. As of 2015, rounders is played by an estimated seven million children in the UK.

Gameplay centres on a number of innings, in which teams alternate at batting and fielding. Points (known as 'rounders') are scored by the batting team when one of their players completes a circuit past four bases without being put 'out'. The batter must strike at a good ball and attempt to run a rounder in an anti-clockwise direction around the first, second, and third base and home to the fourth, though they may stay at any of the first three. A batter is out if the ball is caught; if the base to which they are running is touched with the ball; or if, while running, they are touched with the ball by a fielder.

== History ==
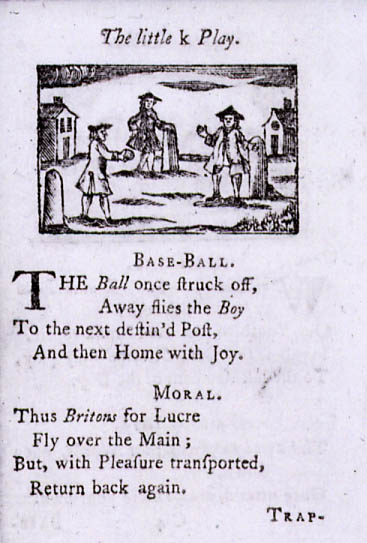
The children's book A Little Pretty Pocket-Book (1744), included an illustration of base-ball, depicting a batter, a bowler, and several rounders posts. The rhyme refers to the ball being hit, the boy running to the next post, and then home to score.

The game of rounders has been played in England since Tudor times, with the earliest reference being in 1744 in A Little Pretty Pocket-Book where it was called base-ball. In 1828, William Clarke in London published the second edition of The Boy's Own Book, which included the rules of rounders and also the first printed description in English of a bat and ball base-running game played on a diamond. The following year, the book was published in Boston, Massachusetts.

The first nationally formalised rules were drawn up by the Gaelic Athletic Association (GAA) in Ireland in 1884. The game is still regulated in Ireland by the GAA, through the GAA Rounders National Council (Irish: Comhairle Cluiche Corr na hÉireann). In Great Britain it is regulated by Rounders England, which was formed in 1943. While the two associations are distinct, they share similar elements of game play and culture. Competitions are held between teams from both traditions.

After the rules of rounders were formalised in Ireland, associations were established in Liverpool, England; and Scotland in 1889. Both the 'New York game' and the now-defunct 'Massachusetts game' versions of baseball, as well as softball, share the same historical roots as rounders and bear a resemblance to the GAA version of the game though they were codified prior to GAA. Rounders is linked to British baseball, which is still played in Liverpool, Cardiff and Newport. Although rounders is assumed to be older than baseball, literary references to early forms of 'base-ball' in England pre-date use of the term rounders.

The game is popular game among British and Irish school children, and is played up to international level. It is played by seven million children in the UK. As an activity catered towards children, Claire Cohen writes, "Rounders is a sport in which even the non-sporty can excel. It's a sport for people who hate sport."

== Rules ==
The satisfying 'thwack' as heavy ball meets wooden bat; the lush green field dotted with coloured cones, shining under the British summer sun; the grass-stained knees as you slide valiantly past fourth base.

— Claire Cohen of The Telegraph on the gameplay of rounders having played it as a girl.

Gameplay comprises a number of innings, in which teams alternate at batting and fielding. Nine players constitute a team, with the fielding side consisting of the bowler, the catcher, a player on each of the four bases, and three deep fielders. Points (known as 'rounders') are scored by the batting team when one of their players completes a circuit past four bases without being put 'out'. The batter must strike at a good ball and attempt to run a rounder in an anti-clockwise direction around the first, second, and third base and home to the fourth, though they may rest at any of the first three.

While there are differences between the rules set by Rounders England and by the GAA, they share much in common. The bowler, or 'feeder', bowls the ball with an underarm pendulum action to the batter. According to Rounders England rules, the ball is deemed a 'good' ball if it passes within reach on the striking side between the batter's knees and the top of the head. Otherwise, it is called a 'no-ball' or 'bad' ball. The ball is also regarded as bad if it is thrown into the batter's body or wide of the batting box. A batter may try to hit a bad ball but is not required to do so. A player is not out if a no-ball is caught and cannot be called out on first base.

When a batter leaves the post, each runner on a base may run to the next and succeeding base. A post runner cannot be declared out when standing at a base. The batter must keep in contact with the base to avoid being declared out. A rounder is scored if one of the batting team completes a circuit without being out. The Rounders England rules state that a half rounder is scored if half a circuit is completed by a player without being put out, or if the batter has not hit the ball but makes it all the way to the fourth base. A batter is out if a fielder catches the ball cleanly; the batter reaches a base that had been 'stumped' (touched while holding the ball) by a fielder; the bat is dropped whilst the batter is running; the batter leaves the base before the bowler has bowled the ball; or the batter is 'run out' (overtaken) by the next batter.

=== Rounders England-specific rules ===
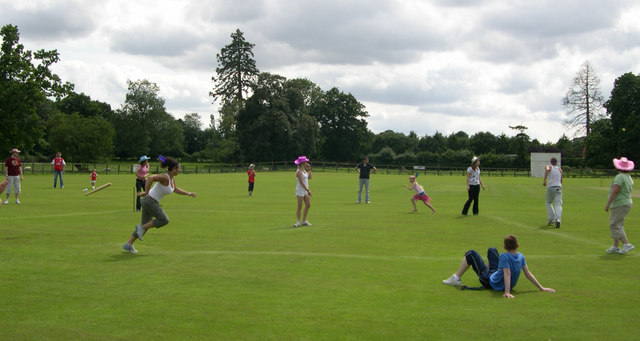
A game of rounders being played in Nowton, England. The girl has hit the ball with her bat and runs to the first base, while her teammates stood on bases run to the next bases.

In the UK, the rules of rounders are regulated by Rounders England. Games played under these rules use smaller bats and balls and are played on a smaller pitch compared to GAA games. The bases are marked with posts, which batters must keep in contact with and fielders must 'stump', and only one 'good' ball needs to be thrown before a batter must run. 'Half-rounders' are also counted in scoring.

The fielding team must field a minimum of six players (one on each base plus bowler and catcher). The total number of players on a team is limited to nine.

The ball circumference must be between 180 millimetres (7.1 in) and 200 millimetres (7.9 in) and the bat no more than 460 millimetres (18 in) in length and 170 millimetres (6.7 in) in diameter. Rounders England place a weight-limit of 370 grams (13 oz) on the bat. The bases are laid out in a manner similar to a baseball diamond, except that batters run to a separate fourth base, at right-angles to third base and the batsman's base. Each base is marked with poles, which must be able to support themselves and stand at a minimum of 1 metre (3 ft 3 in).

If a ball is delivered well, batters must try to hit the ball and must run regardless of whether the ball is hit. If the ball is hit into the backward area, the batter may not pass first post until the ball is returned to the forward area. A batter that hits a no-ball may not be caught out or stumped at the first post. Batters may run on 'no-balls' but do not have to. Each batter, except the last in each inning, is entitled to receive one good ball: the last batter is entitled to receive three good balls unless he or she is caught out.

One rounder is gained if the player hits the ball, then reaches the fourth post and touches it before the next ball is bowled and is not caught out and hit by the ball. A half rounder is gained if: the player reaches the fourth post having missed the ball; the player reaches the second post having hit the ball; if a batter is obstructed by a fielder whilst running; or if the same batter has two consecutive no balls.

A batter is out if a fielder catches the ball after it has been hit and before it touches the ground, a fielder touches the post of the base halfway up (or higher) with the ball while the batter is running to it, the batter deliberately drops or throws the bat, or another batter runs to the same base or overtakes a batter, in which case both batters are out.

Two innings constitute a game. Each batting team's innings continues until nine outs are made or the numbered innings is over.

=== GAA-specific rules ===
In Ireland, the rules of rounders (Irish: cluiche corr) are laid down by the Gaelic Athletic Association. The GAA rules are the earliest nationally organised rules of play, being formalised in 1884. It is played on a larger pitch compared to the Rounders England game and consequently uses larger bats and slightly larger balls. A GAA rounders pitch is a 70-metre (77 yd) square field and bases are 25 metres (27 yd) apart, compared to 12 metres (13 yd) for the Rounders England game. Foul ground runs along two adjacent sides of the pitch with a home base at the intersection of these sides.

Five substitutes may be made to the list of nine players at any time during play. A maximum of nine players are allowed to field at one time. Once one team has fielded, then they take their turn at batting following a pre given batting order.

The ball (or sliotar) circumference is 22.7–25.5 centimetres (8.9–10.0 in) and bats may be 70–110 centimetres (28–43 in) long and up to 7 centimetres (2.8 in) in diameter. There is no limit on bat weight. Bases and pitchers stand are normally marked with temporary square mats 64 cm (28") square.

Each batter is entitled to three good balls. A good ball is one that travels the whole way across home base and between the batters knee and shoulder. A batter can try to hit any good balls that are pitched but need not run once hitting the ball or the first two good balls.

A batter can run on any hit ball that lands in good ground or which is made good by touching a fielder then landing in foul ground. On a third good ball a batter has to run (move from batters box) whether they hit it or not.

Batters may run, but if the sliotar lands in foul ground then the referee calls them back as no play can happen on a foul ball.

A batter is out if:

- on a third good ball, the batter fails to strike the ball and the catcher holds the ball before it touches the ground;
- the bat is thrown or tossed in a dangerous way;
- on a third good ball, the batter strikes the ball into the foul area;
- the bowler or catcher's view is obstructed for a second time, after a warning given on the first instance;
- Tagging a runner – i.e. deliberate contact is made with a fielder carrying the ball;
- the batter touches a base that has been 'tagged' by another fielder carrying the ball, in which case the batter must return to the previous base if it is still unoccupied;
- the batter attempts to occupy a base occupied by someone else.

Batters must run in straight lines between bases and fielders must not obstruct their way or stand on bases. Disobeying this rule is considered unsporting behaviour and may result in up to two bases being awarded to the batting team or a batter being sent out. Normally, one batter may not overtake another while running between bases, although there are exceptions to this rule.

Five innings constitute a game, depending on the level of the match. Each batting team's inning continues until three outs are made.

== Comparison with softball and baseball ==
The GAA version of rounders is very similar to softball, the main difference being that the game is played with baseball-sized bats, balls and field. However, baseball-style gloves are not allowed. The main differences between baseball and the English version of the game are that the rounders bat is much shorter and is usually swung one-handed; misses or strikes are not called, so there are no walks or strike-outs; each batter receives only one good ball and must run whether they hit it or not. Other differences include the posts for marking the bases, which should be wooden, and are preferably encased in plastic sheaths, the layout of the pitch, especially the location of the last base; and the bowler's arm motion, which is an underarm pendulum action, as in softball.

== See also ==
- Brännboll
- Elle
- Lapta
- Oină
- Palant
- Pesäpallo
- Safe haven games
- Stoolball
- Danish longball
