= A Little Pretty Pocket-Book =

1744 children's book by John Newbery

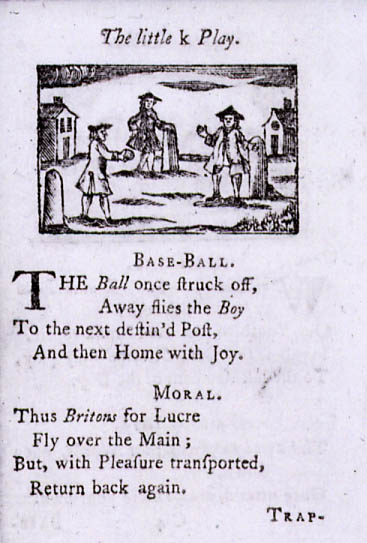
A woodcut from A Little Pretty Pocketbook (1744), England, showing the first reference to baseball.

A Little Pretty Pocket-Book, intended for the Amusement of Little Master Tommy and Pretty Miss Polly with Two Letters from Jack the Giant Killer is the title of a 1744 children's book by British publisher John Newbery.

== History ==
It is generally considered the first children's book, and consists of simple rhymes for each of the letters of the alphabet. To market the book to the children of the day, the book came with either a ball for a boy, or a pincushion for a girl. The book was very popular in England, and earned Newbery much fame; eventually the Newbery Medal was named after him. The book was re-published in Colonial America in 1762. Dr A S W Rosenbach called this book, "One of the most influential and important books in the history of juvenile literature."

== Description ==
The book includes a woodcut of stool-ball among other period games, and includes a rhyme entitled "Base-Ball." This is the first known reference to "base-ball" or "baseball" in print, though it actually meant the game rounders, an ancestor of modern baseball. Of baseball's English origin: "The game of Rounders has been played in England since Tudor Times, with the earliest reference being in 1744 in 'A Little Pretty Pocketbook' where it is called baseball." "It is a striking and fielding team game, which involves hitting a small hard leather cased ball with a round wooden or metal bat and then running around 4 bases in order to score." John Thorn, the official historian for Major League Baseball, has suggested that the game depicted may not have involved the use of a bat, and thus is a predecessor of sorts to punchball.

== See also ==
- British baseball
