= 1858 Brooklyn–New York all-star game =

Coordinates: 40°45′12″N 73°51′52″W

- Date: July 20, 1858; August 17, 1858; September 10, 1858
- Venue: Fashion Course
- Location: Queens, New York
- Also known as: The Great Base Ball Match of 1858
- Participants: New York and Brooklyn amateur baseball players

The 1858 Brooklyn–New York all-star game, sometimes known as the "Great Base Ball Match of 1858", was a series of baseball contests between select standout players of from various amateur clubs in Manhattan and Brooklyn during the summer of 1858. In inviting only select players from multiple clubs, these games are now considered precursors to modern professional all-star games. Hosted at the Fashion Course in Queens, the series is also noticeable for being the first baseball events to charge admission for spectators. Brooklyn and New York faced off three times—on July 20, August 17, and September 10—with New York ultimately prevailing in the series, 2–1.

== Prelude ==
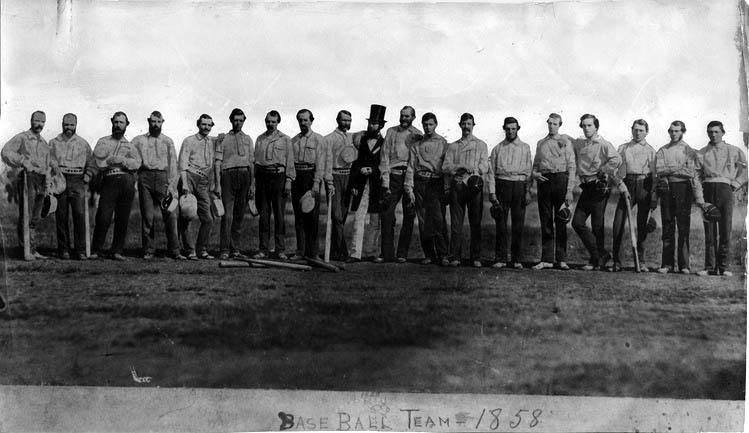
The New York Knickerbockers in 1858

The New York metropolitan area was a hotbed of amateur baseball in the mid-19th century, with early pioneering clubs like the Knickerbockers proving influential in developing rules in the mid-1840s that evolved into the modern form of baseball played professionally in the United States since the 1870s. The number of amateur clubs in New York and Brooklyn grew from 6 in 1854 to about 24 the next year, with continued rapid expansion for the rest of the decade. Sixteen New York–area clubs convened in 1857 to refine the standard rules, making fundamental decisions like setting the bases 90 feet apart. An outgrowth of this convention was the National Association of Base Ball Players (NABBP), the first baseball governing organization. In 1858, the NABBP decided to organize a series of games pitting the top players from New York and Brooklyn member clubs.

== Venue ==
Match organizers sought to find a neutral hosting ground easily accessible by public transit; they settled on the Fashion Course horse racing grounds in Flushing, Queens, which was reachable by omnibus, rail, and trolley. The course featured a grandstand, enabling spectators to sit in comfort. The organizers created an all-dirt infield on the course by stripping away grass turf; the costs associated with landscaping the field and renting the facility incurred unexpected costs for the clubs. To cover these costs—and taking advantage of the gated entrances to the facility—the clubs decided to charge an admission fee of 10 cents for the event. The 1858 matches thus became (in addition to being the first all-star games), the first to be played in an enclosed ground and the first to require paid admission.

== Matches ==
=== First match ===
The highly anticipated first match, on July 20, featured members of the Knickerbocker, Gotham, Eagle, Empire, Harlem, and Union clubs on the New York side, and members of the Atlantics, Excelsior, Putnam, and Eckford clubs from Brooklyn. Among the New York players was Knickerbocker Harry Wright, who would be elected to the Baseball Hall of Fame nearly a century later. Attendance estimates for this game range from 4,000 to 10,000.

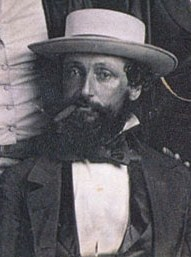
Baseball pioneer Doc Adams umpired the third and final match.

The New York squad prevailed in the debut match, 22–18. The game ball used in this match survives to this day and is in the possession of the Baseball Hall of Fame.

=== Second match ===
Both club managers made personnel changes after the first match. Eckford of Brooklyn cofounder Frank Pidgeon was moved from shortstop to pitcher for this game. Pidgeon's scorecard for the match survives today.

The Brooklyn stars routed New York, 29–8, evening the series.

=== Final match ===
After its strong showing in the second match, Brooklyn left its lineup mostly intact for the rubber match. New York, however, made major lineup changes, including a change at pitcher. Longtime Knickerbocker and baseball pioneer Doc Adams served as umpire and was the first umpire to apply an NABBP rule that called batters out after non-swinging strikes. Frank Pidegon returned as pitcher for Brooklyn, logging 438 pitches during the match.

New York won, 29–18, handing them the series victory.

== Aftermath ==
SABR researcher Robert H. Schaefer concluded, "The Great Base Ball Match of 1858 set in motion a sequence of events that ultimately, after many incremental steps, produced the structure of major league baseball that we know today." The first match netted a profit of $71.10 after expenses, which the organizers donated to New York and Brooklyn charities. Although the clubs did not seek or retain the profits, they proved that baseball was popular enough to become a profitable venture. A number of 1858 all-stars, including Harry Wright and William H. Van Cott, participated in the "first-ever multi-club intercity tournament" in 1862, competing against Philadelphia clubs.

Although New York won the series, Brooklyn clubs proved to dominate local competition in the 1860s. By 1862, Bill Cammeyer established the first enclosed ballpark designed solely for baseball use—Union Grounds in Williamsburg—and began charging regular admission fees. By the end of the 1860s, baseball was in the process of becoming a professional industry, and in 1871 the NABBP was replaced by the National Association of Professional Base Ball Players—the first professional baseball league.

Major League Baseball played its first official all-star game in 1933.
