= Frank Pidgeon =

American baseball pitcher (1825–1884)

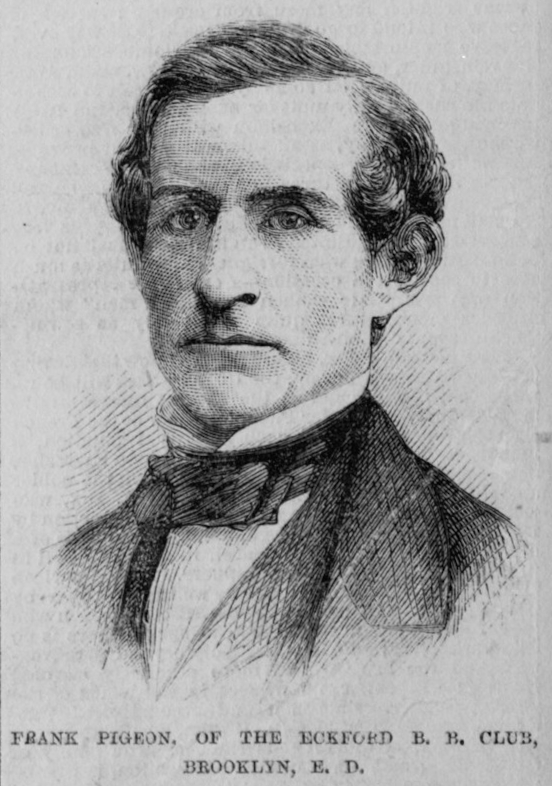
- Pitcher
- Born: February 11, 1825; New York City, New York
- Died: June 2, 1884 (aged 59); New York City, New York

Teams
- Eckford of Brooklyn (1855–1862)

Career highlights and awards
- Club president (Eckford)

Francis Pidgeon Sr. (February 11, 1825 – June 12, 1884) was an American baseball pitcher. He played for Eckford of Brooklyn from 1855 to 1862, and was one of the club's founders. Pidgeon has been called one of the top pitchers of the era, and participated in New York-area all-star games in 1858. Playing as an amateur, Pidgeon vigorously opposed payments to baseball players and authored a law banning them in the National Association of Base Ball Players (NABBP). After professionalism began spreading, he left the Eckford club before sponsoring an unsuccessful resolution opposing player pay in 1870. Pidgeon worked as a contractor before being hit by a train and killed in 1884.

== Early life and family ==
Pidgeon was born on February 11, 1825, in modern-day New York City. He built ships and yachts in Brooklyn, having entered the field in his youth. In 1849, Pidgeon traveled to California as part of the California Gold Rush, but by the following year he had returned to New York. He and Mary Elizabeth Orr were married following his trip to the West, and the couple had six children: four daughters and two sons.

== Baseball career ==
=== Formation of Eckford ===
At the age of 30, Pidgeon became one of the founders of the baseball team Eckford of Brooklyn in 1855. The club's early members were mainly mechanics and shipbuilders, and deceased shipbuilder Henry Eckford was its namesake. Pidgeon quickly assumed a leadership role for Eckford. According to Pidgeon's account, the demands of the players' professions led to a lack of practice time: they were limited to one session of play a week, at most. The members were open to a competitive game against another club, but Pidgeon wrote that "no such invitation came, and we began seriously to doubt if we were worth taking notice of." Regardless, he and his teammates enjoyed playing recreationally; Pidgeon's opinion was that "Such sport as this brightens a man up, and improves him, both in mind and body."

Pidgeon was the team's first president in 1855. At an 1857 convention of local baseball teams, in which a common set of rules was drafted, Pidgeon was one of Eckford's three delegates. After not holding an executive position for the club in 1856 or 1857, he was a secretary in 1858 before serving again as club president in 1860 and 1861. His last held that position in 1863.

=== Competitive play ===
In 1856, Eckford moved to play for the first time against a rival team. After issuing a challenge, they were scheduled to face either Union of Morrisania or the Baltics, depending on who won a match game between those sides. Union prevailed, and heading into their game Eckford's members feared a lopsided loss. However, Eckford upset Union by a score of 22–8. One month after their matchup, the two teams faced each other in a rematch. Eckford won again, 22–6. The pair of results gave Eckford recognition in the baseball press.

Eckford played seven match games the following year, but won only twice. Two of their defeats came against the Brooklyn Atlantics. The team improved in 1858, as it began attracting players from Brooklyn's Eastern District, particularly volunteer firemen. Their record was 5–1 in match play for the season. That year, Pidgeon was chosen as part of a team of players from Brooklyn-based clubs to compete in a series of three all-star games against a group representing New York City sides. Brooklyn lost the first game on July 20, 22–18, as Pidgeon started at shortstop. For the second game, on August 17, he was Brooklyn's pitcher. Throwing 290 pitches in the contest, Pidgeon helped Brooklyn to a 29–8 victory that evened the series. Offensively, he contributed three runs, having scored once in game one. On September 10, the series was decided in the third game. Pidgeon allowed a home run to the leadoff hitter for New York, shortstop Joe Gelston, and was forced to throw 87 pitches in the first inning as New York posted seven runs. New York went on to win by a 29–18 final score, as Pidgeon's pitch count reached 436 for the game. He accounted for three of Brooklyn's runs in the loss.

The 1859 Eckford team played more often than in previous years. Among their 14 games were three against Atlantic which decided the NABBP championship. After a loss in game one, Pidgeon's Eckford team defeated Atlantic 22–16 in the second game, giving Atlantic its first loss in two seasons. With the opportunity to win the NABBP title, Eckford lost by 10 runs in the third game. Eckford again challenged Atlantic for the championship in 1860, but lost the first game 17–15 after a late Atlantic rally. Pidgeon attempted to offer encouragement during game two, in which Eckford trailed early, by advising his teammates to pretend they were "playing a common club, and forget that these fellows are the Atlantics." Eckford promptly took the lead, and a seven-run ninth inning gave them a win; however, they lost to Atlantic in the third and deciding game.

Although Pidgeon joined the rest of the team in offseason social gatherings, he did not make any game appearances in 1861, but supported them as a spectator. He next played in July 1862, for an Eckford club that ended up winning the NABBP title over Atlantic. In 1863, Pidgeon stopped playing baseball; author William J. Ryczek attributes this to a leg injury that occurred as the result of an accident.

=== Playing style ===
Pidgeon was Eckfort's captain, and second base, shortstop, and left field were all positions that he played at times. However, pitching was what he was most recognized for. From 1856 to 1860, Pidgeon was the most frequently used Eckford pitcher. As was customary at the time, Pidgeon pitched in a way that drew contact from hitters, and delivered pitches with varying arcs and velocities. He attempted to identity weaknesses in his opposition, and had an image as an intelligent player. A sportswriter said that, in game management skills, "we think Pidgeon has no equal." Baseball historian John Thorn has written that Pidgeon was the top pitcher in the sport during the 1850s.

Ryczek describes Pidgeon as a player who comported himself as a gentlemen, but was highly competitive on the field. In one game against Atlantic, Pidgeon reportedly ripped off pieces of his clothing as the contest progressed, in an attempt "to put an extra twist on the ball"; despite his efforts, Eckford was defeated.

=== Opposition to professionalism ===
Pidgeon played as an amateur, and was an outspoken opponent of baseball players receiving money from teams. The NABBP outlawed the practice of teams paying players in 1859, with Pidgeon the author of the law. However, secret payments were sometimes made in spite of the regulation, as the NABBP proved unable to enforce it; one example came when Excelsior of Brooklyn obtained the services of Jim Creighton. Some teams used the promise of compensation for travel expenses to attract new talent. The newspaper Spirit of the Times criticized the NABBP's rules on the subject in March 1859, arguing that relaxing them might place rich and poor players on a more level playing field. Pidgeon wrote a letter to the paper one week after its initial column on the subject, in which he defended the association's amateurism regulations. In his response, he indicated his belief that "a man who does not pay his obligations and has it in his power to do so is a knave and not fit to be trusted in the game of ball or anywhere else". In cases where players could not pay their way, Pidgeon suggested that they prioritize earning a living over the sport of baseball.

In addition, he expressed distaste at the idea of a person's teammates being "bought up like cattle", and claimed that payments to players had been made, leading to the rule. Pidgeon himself was later the subject of false reports that he would move to Atlantic, which led him to profess his loyalty to Eckford. Ryczek wrote the Pidgeon was "forever anchored" to the norms of baseball in the 1850s. Author George B. Kirsch states that Pidgeon's opposition stemmed in part from his concern that teams composed of skilled workers would have difficulty competing with wealthy clubs under professionalism.

After Eckford completed an undefeated season in 1863 and won a second straight NABBP title, the team experienced numerous defections to Atlantic and the New York Mutuals. Sportswriter Henry Chadwick wrote that the club needed Pidgeon's influence. However, he was not interested in making a return, as professionalism became more commonplace. As Eckford became a professional side, Pidgeon ended his involvement with the team. After the NABBP created separate classes for amateur and professional teams, a new resolution in opposition to player pay was put up for a vote by amateur clubs, such as the New York Knickerbockers, at an 1870 convention. Pidgeon sponsored the proposal, and spoke on its behalf, in what Ryczek calls "amateurism's last stand". Along with his claim that richer clubs would have a leg up in a professional league, Pidgeon argued that the independence of players would be placed under threat, as he believed that professionalism would cause wage slavery. In spite of his efforts, the resolution was opposed by 17 of the 26 clubs that participated in the vote. Ten professional teams ultimately formed the National Association of Professional Base Ball Players, while amateur clubs founded their own league, which folded after four seasons.

== Later life ==
Shortly after the end of his playing career, Pidgeon and his family moved upstate to a house near Saugerties. Working as a construction contractor, Pidgeon built docks and worked on landfills in Brooklyn and New York City. He became wealthy and garnered significant holdings of land that he received as payment for services. By 1870, Pidgeon's oldest son had become a contractor himself. Pidgeon's own business, however, was negatively affected by a Brooklyn investigation into budget overruns, which slowed a job he had invested in and delayed payment from the government. Pidgeon regularly submitted low bids for municipal work, which depleted his savings and led him to file for bankruptcy in 1881. He subsequently worked for his son's business and relocated to Harlem in April 1884.

On June 12, 1884, Pidgeon was walking on the Hudson River Railroad when he was hit by a train, killing him at the age of 59. Questions arose as to whether Pidgeon killed himself or was the victim of an accident. According to Ryczek, contemporary reports cited his injured leg as a contributing factor in Pidgeon being unable to move away from the train; conversely, he argues that Pidgeon was facing the train that hit him and did not act upon warnings, and had seen his personal fortunes decline. Pidgeon was buried in Mountain View Cemetery in the village of Saugerties, New York.

== Bibliography ==
- Burk, Robert F. (2001). Never Just a Game: Players, Owners, and American Baseball to 1920. University of North Carolina Press. ISBN 978-0-8078-4961-3.
- Freyer, John K.; Rucker, Mark (2005). Peverelly's National Game. Arcadia Publishing. ISBN 978-0-7385-3404-6.
- Kirsch, George B. (2013). Baseball in Blue and Gray: The National Pastime during the Civil War. Princeton University Press. ISBN 978-1-4008-4925-3.
- Morris, Peter (2008). But Didn't We Have Fun?: An Informal History of Baseball's Pioneer Era, 1843–1870. Ivan R. Dee. ISBN 978-1-56663-849-4.
- Ryczek, William J. (2009). Baseball's First Inning: A History of the National Pastime Through the Civil War. McFarland & Company. ISBN 978-0-7864-4194-5.
- Ryczek, William J.; Morris, Peter (2013). "Eckford Base Ball Club". In Morris, Peter; Ryczek, William J.; Finkel, Jan; Levin, Leonard; Malatzky, Richard (eds.). Base Ball Founders: The Clubs, Players, and Cities of the Northeast That Established the Game. McFarland & Company. ISBN 978-0-7864-7430-1.
- Schaefer, Robert H. "The Great Base Ball Match of 1858". NINE: A Journal of Baseball History & Culture. 14 (1): 47–66. ISSN 1188-9330.
- Sullivan, Dean A., ed. (1997). Early Innings: A Documentary History of Baseball, 1825–1908. University of Nebraska Press. ISBN 978-0-8032-9244-4.
- Thorn, John (2011). Baseball in the Garden of Eden: The Secret History of the Early Game. Simon & Schuster. ISBN 978-0-7432-9403-4.
