= Alexander Cartwright =

Baseball club founding member (1820–1892)

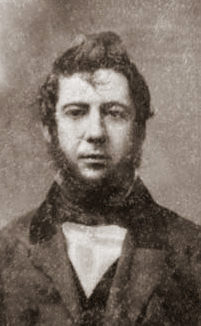
- Cartwright in 1855
- Born: Alexander Joy Cartwright Jr. April 17, 1820; New York City, New York, U.S.
- Died: July 12, 1892 (aged 72); Honolulu, Kingdom of Hawai'i

Career highlights and awards
- Known for invention of the modern game of baseball (disputed); Signature

Member of the National

Baseball Hall of Fame
- Induction: 1938
- Election method: Centennial Commission

Alexander Joy Cartwright Jr. (April 17, 1820 – July 12, 1892) was a founding member of the New York Knickerbockers Base Ball Club in the 1840s. Although he was an inductee of the Baseball Hall of Fame and he was sometimes referred to as a "father of baseball", the importance of his role in the development of the game may have been exaggerated.

The rules of the modern game were long considered to have been based on the Knickerbocker Rules developed in 1845 by Cartwright and a committee from the Knickerbockers. However, later research called this scenario into question. The myth of Abner Doubleday having invented baseball was believed by many, but in Cooperstown in 1939, the myth was debunked. Cartwright (unlike Doubleday) was inducted into the Hall of Fame as a pioneering contributor to the game, 46 years after his death. Although it has been stated that Cartwright was officially declared the inventor of the modern game of baseball by the 83rd United States Congress on June 3, 1953, the Congressional Record, the House Journal, and the Senate Journal from June 3, 1953, did not mention Cartwright.

== Early life and work ==
Cartwright was born in 1820 to Alexander Cartwright Sr. (1784–1855), a merchant sea captain, and Esther Rebecca Burlock Cartwright (1792–1871). Alexander Jr. had six siblings. He first worked at the age of 16 in 1836 as a clerk for a Wall Street broker, later doing clerical work at the Union Bank of New York. After hours, he played bat-and-ball games in the streets of Manhattan with volunteer firefighters. Cartwright himself was a volunteer, first with Oceana Hose Company No. 36, and then Knickerbocker Engine Company No. 12. Cartwright's ancestor Thomas Cartwright, of Aynho Park, Northamptonshire was an English landowner and Tory politician, who sat in the English and British House of Commons between 1695 and 1748. As the longest serving member he was dubbed Father of the House.

A fire destroyed the Union Bank in 1845, forcing Cartwright to find other work. He became a bookseller with his brother, Alfred.

== Knickerbocker Base Ball Club ==
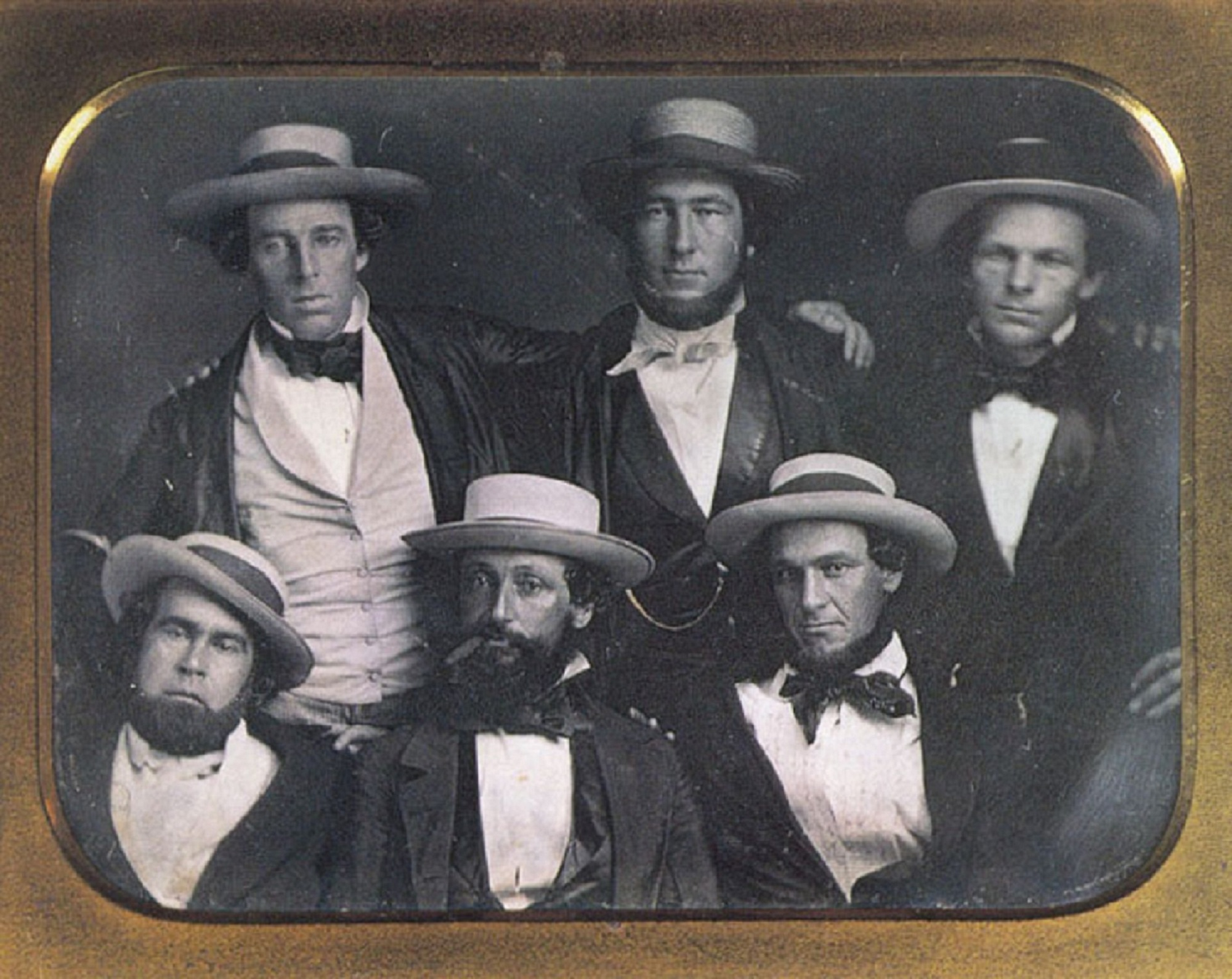
The New York Knickerbockers Baseball Club, circa 1847. Cartwright at the top middle. The identification of Cartwright has been disputed.

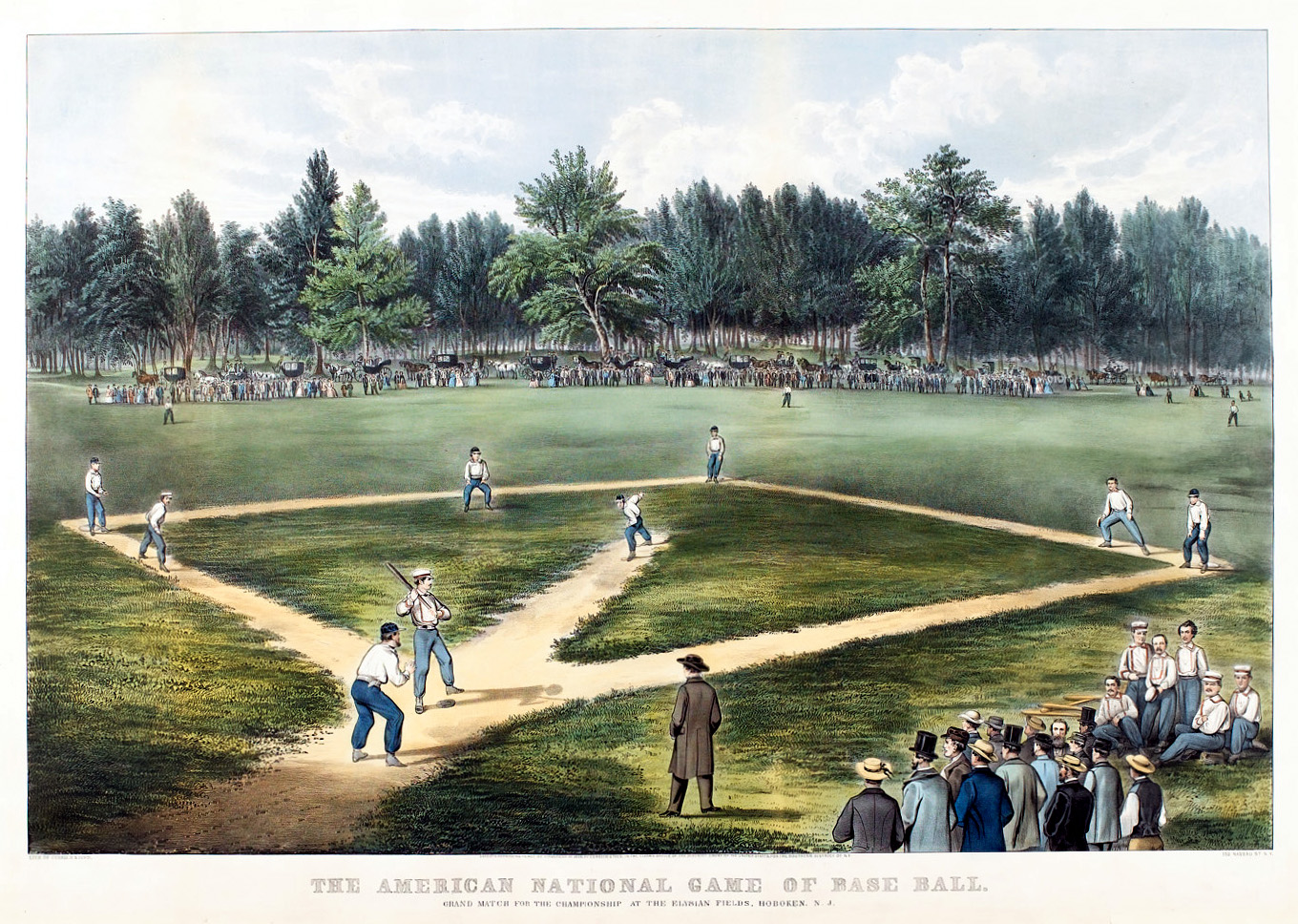
Early baseball game played at Elysian Fields in Hoboken, New Jersey (lithograph by Currier and Ives)

One of the earliest known established clubs was the Gotham Base Ball Club, who played a brand of bat-and-ball game often called "town ball" or "round ball," but in New York more usually "base ball," similar but not identical to the English sport of rounders, on a field at 4th Avenue and 27th Street. In 1837, Gotham member William R. Wheaton drew up rules converting this playground game into a more elaborate and interesting sport to be played by adults. In 1842, Cartwright led the establishment of the Knickerbocker Base Ball Club (named after the Knickerbocker Fire Engine Company), a breakaway group from the Gothams.

In 1845, a committee from the new club including Wheaton (but not Cartwright) drew up rules resembling those of the Gothams. The major precepts included the stipulations that foul territories were to be introduced for the first time, and the practice of retiring a runner by hitting him with a thrown ball was forbidden. Cartwright is also erroneously credited for introducing flat bases at uniform distances, three strikes per batter, and nine players in the outfield. However, modern scholarship has cast doubt on the originality of these rules, as information has come to light about the New York clubs that predated the Knickerbockers, in particular the rules devised by William R. Wheaton for the Gotham Club in 1837. Baseball historian Jeffrey Kittel has concluded that none of the Knickerbocker Rules of 1845 was original, with the possible exception of three-out innings. As MLB's Official Historian John Thorn wrote, Cartwright has "a plaque in the Baseball Hall of Fame on which every word of substance is false. Alex Cartwright did not set the base paths at ninety feet, the sides at nine men, or the game at nine innings." (In fact, all three were established by the inter-club Convention of 1857, eight years after Cartwright had left New York).

The first clearly documented match between two baseball clubs under these rules took place on June 19, 1846, at Elysian Fields in Hoboken, New Jersey. In this match, the Knickerbockers lost to the "New York nine" (probably the parent Gotham Club) by a score of 23 to 1. Some authors have also questioned the supposed "first game" under the new rules. The Knickerbockers' scorebook shows intra-club games during 1845; the New York Base Ball Club played at least three games against a Brooklyn club in 1845 also, but the rules used are unknown. Those who have studied the score-book have concluded that the differences in the games of 1845 and 1846, compared with the specifications of the Knickerbocker rules, are minimal.

== Hawaii ==
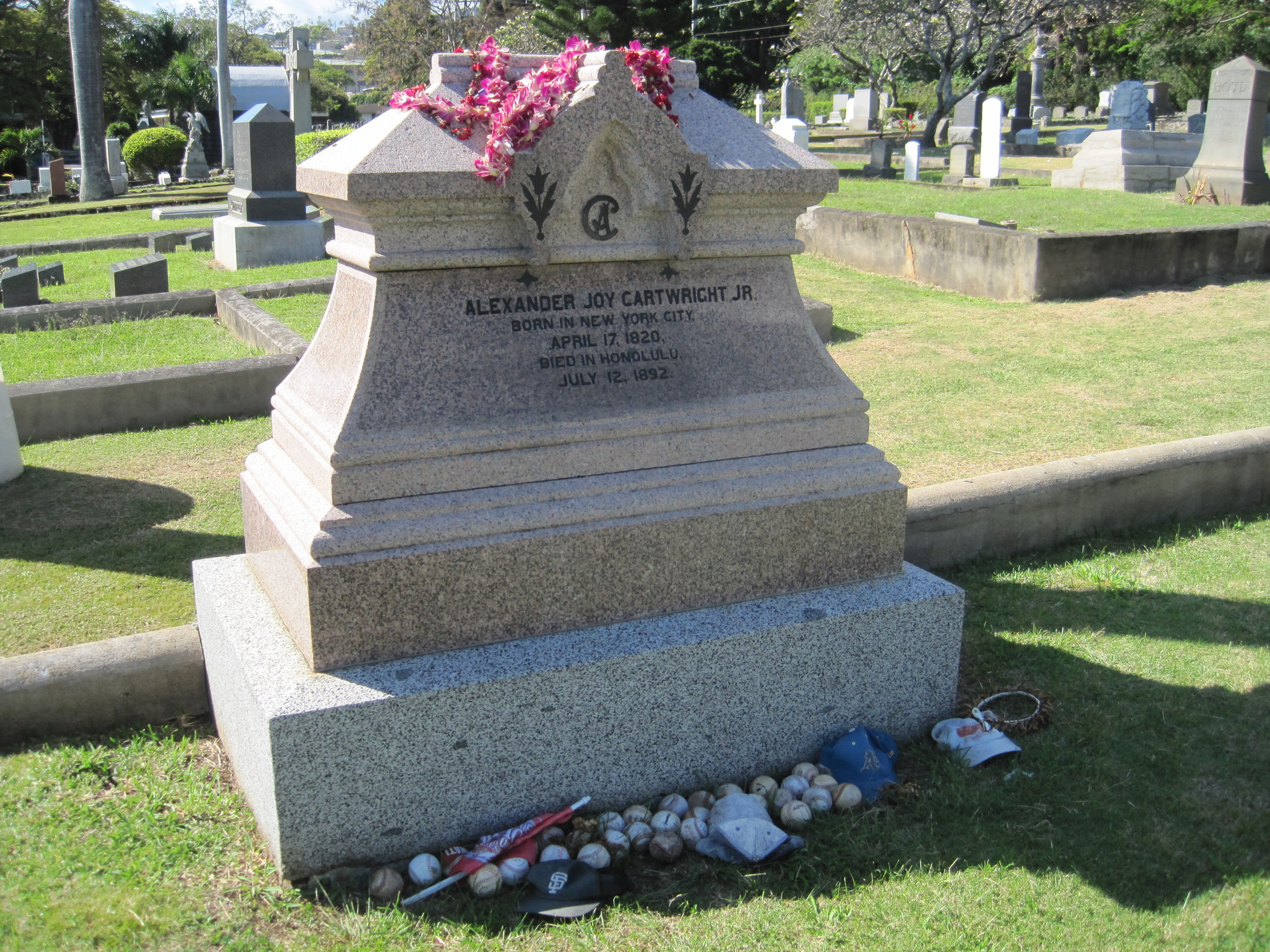
Cartwright's tombstone in Oahu Cemetery, Honolulu

In 1849, Cartwright headed to California for the gold rush, and then continued on to work and live in the Kingdom of Hawaii. His family came to join him in 1851: wife Eliza Van Wie, son DeWitt (1843–1870), daughter Mary (1845–1869), and daughter Catherine (Kate) Lee (1849–1851). Their sons Bruce Cartwright (1853–1919) and Alexander Joy Cartwright III (1855–1921) were born in Hawaii. Some secondary sources claim Cartwright set up a baseball field on the island of Oahu at Makiki Field in 1852, but Nucciarone states that before 1866, the modern game of baseball was not known or even played in Honolulu. Also, she states that during Cartwright's lifetime he was not declared or documented as an originator of baseball in Hawaii.

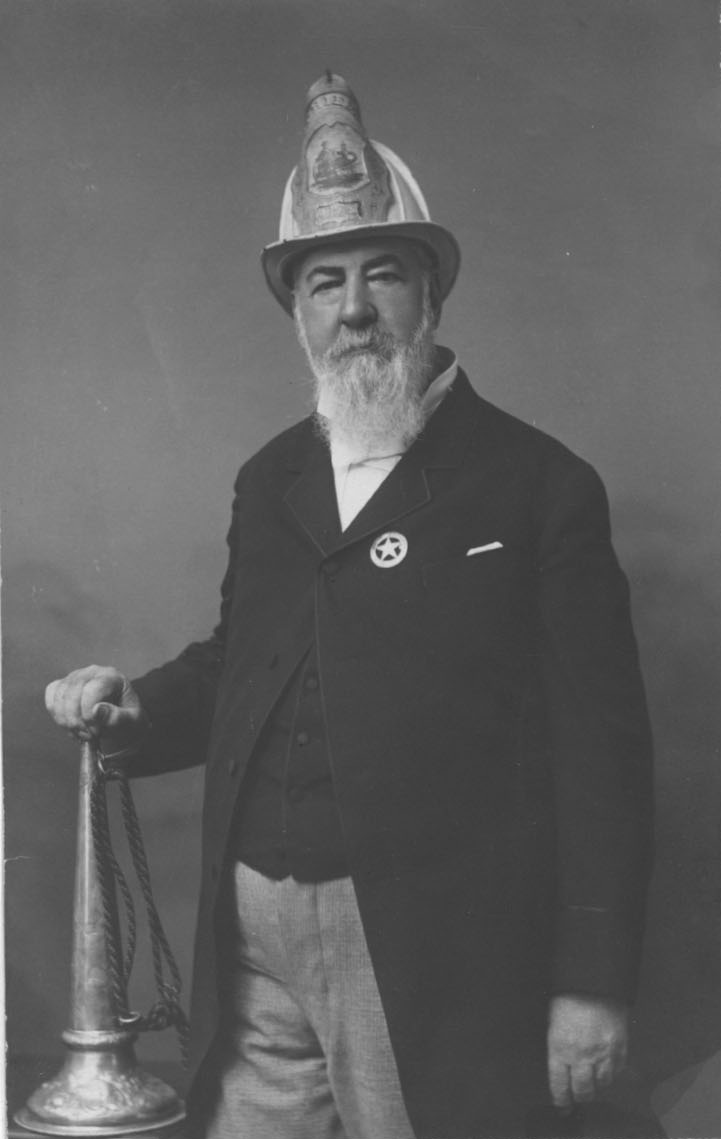
Cartwright in later life as fire chief

Cartwright served as fire chief of Honolulu from 1850 through June 30, 1863. He was an advisor to King David Kalākaua and Queen Emma. Cartwright died on July 12, 1892, six months before the overthrow of the Hawaiian monarchy in 1893. One of the leaders of the overthrow movement was Lorrin A. Thurston, who played baseball with classmate Alexander Cartwright III at Punahou School. Cartwright was buried in Oahu Cemetery.

== Legacy ==
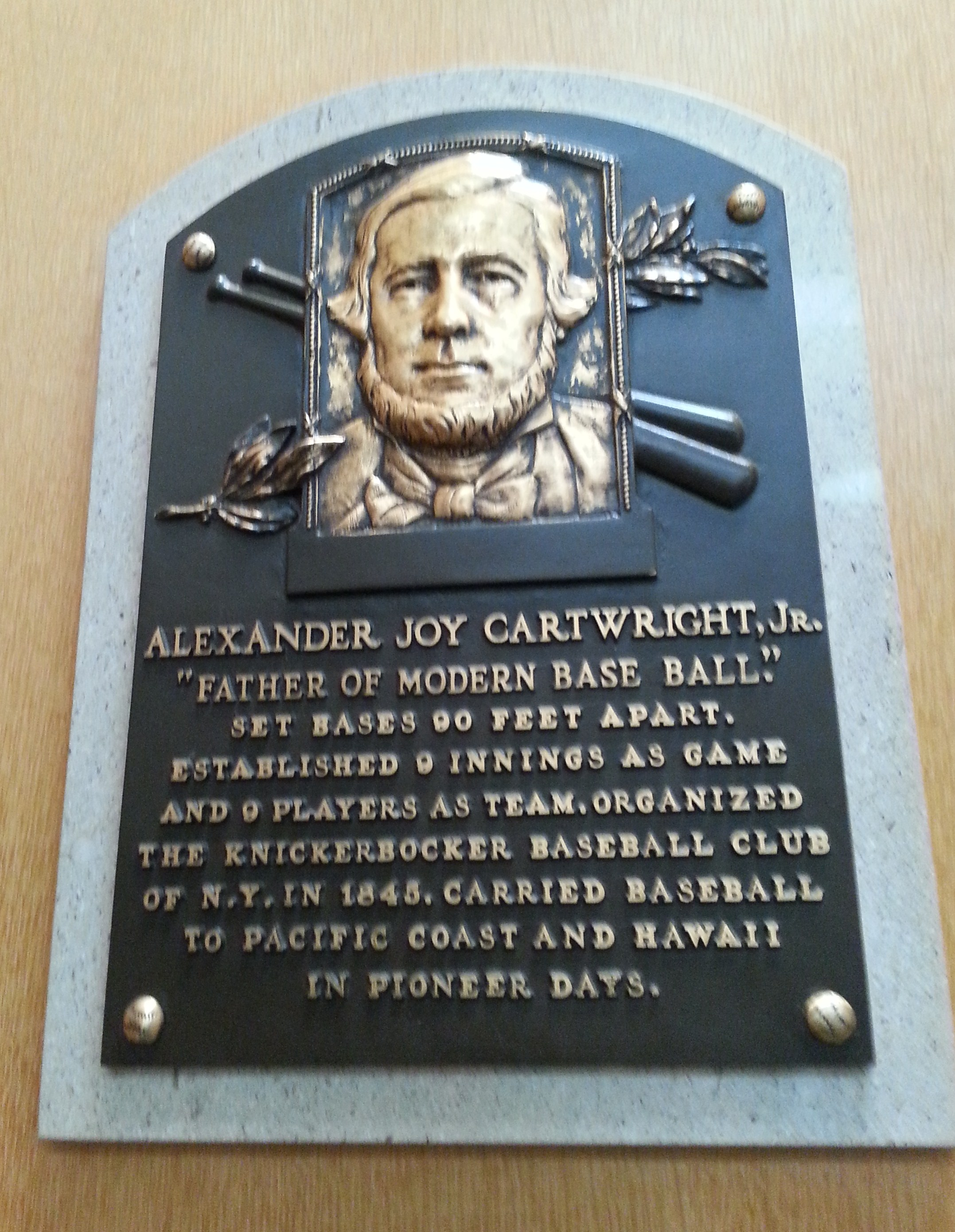
Cartwright's plaque at the National Baseball Hall of Fame and Museum

After about two decades of controversy, invention of America's "national game" of baseball was attributed to Abner Doubleday by the Mills Commission (1905–1907). Some baseball historians promptly cried foul and others joined throughout the 20th century. Cartwright was inducted into the Baseball Hall of Fame in 1938.

New York City librarian Robert W. Henderson documented Cartwright's contributions to baseball in his 1947 book Bat, Ball, and Bishop. Although there is no question that Cartwright was a prominent figure in the early development of baseball, some students of baseball history have suggested that Henderson and others embellished Cartwright's role. The primary complaint is that touting Cartwright as the "true" inventor of the modern game was an effort to find an alternative single individual to counter the "invention" of baseball by Abner Doubleday.

Cartwright was the subject of a 1973 biography, The Man Who Invented Baseball, by Harold Peterson. He was the subject of two biographies written in 2009. Jay Martin's Live All You Can: Alexander Joy Cartwright & the Invention of Modern Baseball supports Cartwright as the inventor of baseball, while Alexander Cartwright: The Life Behind the Baseball Legend by Monica Nucciarone credits Cartwright as one of the game's pioneers but not its sole founder. The 2004 discovery of a newspaper interview with fellow Knickerbocker founder William R. Wheaton cast doubt on Cartwright's role. Wheaton stated that most of the rules long attributed to Cartwright and the Knickerbockers had in fact been developed by the older Gotham Club before the Knickerbockers' founding.

In 1938, Makiki Field in Honolulu was renamed Cartwright Field. The Cartwright Cup is awarded to the Hawaii state high school baseball champions each year.

== See also ==
- History of Hawaii
- Origins of baseball
