= William H. Van Cott =

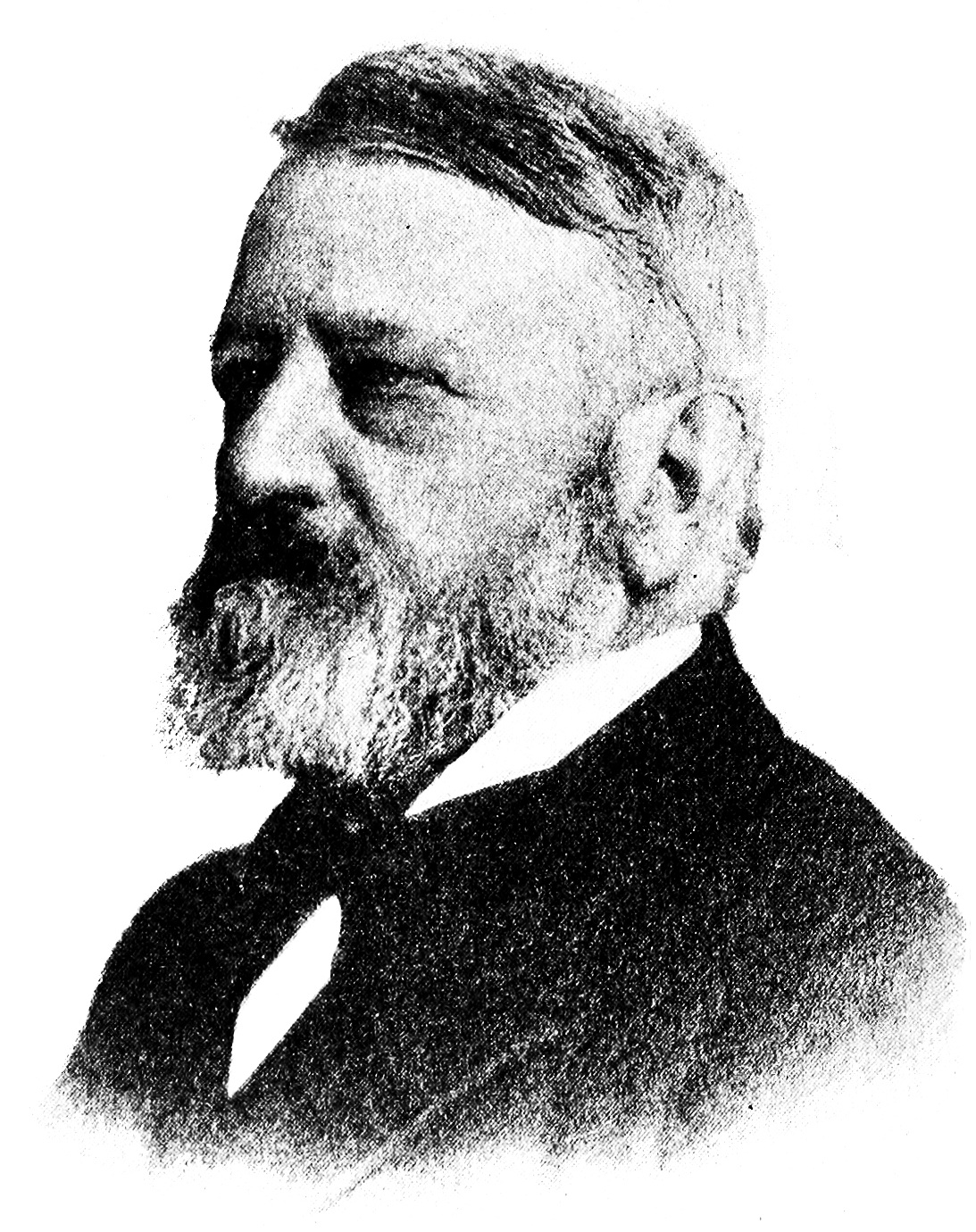
- Born: September 26, 1821; New York City
- Died: June 30, 1908 (aged 86); Mount Vernon, New York
- Occupation: Judge

William Hathaway Van Cott, Sr. (September 26, 1821 – June 30, 1908) was a jurist and baseball pioneer in New York who served on the New York Supreme Court for 16 years.

Van Cott was a leading figure in New York City's burgeoning amateur baseball scene in the 1850s. He joined the New York Gothams in 1851 and is recorded as having played against the Knickerbockers in a July 1853 match. Van Cott wrote a letter to several New York newspapers in December 1854 on the growth of amateur baseball clubs; this may be the first mention of baseball in The New York Times. He was elected president of the Gotham club in 1856.

In 1858, Van Cott was elected the first president of the National Association of Base Ball Players (NABBP), the first baseball governing organization. Later that year, he played in the first two games of the Great Base Ball Match of 1858, which pitted the best players of New York and Brooklyn clubs against each other in the first baseball events that required paid admission for spectators. He also played in the first multi-club intercity tournament in 1862, as part of a New York squad playing Philadelphia stars. In 1866, he was a member of the first baseball club in Mount Vernon, New York, the Una Club, which joined the NABBP.
