= 1857 baseball convention =

New York City meeting on baseball rules

The 1857 baseball convention was a meeting of members from 16 New York City-area baseball clubs that took place over multiple sessions in early 1857. It passed numerous clarifications of the pre-existing Knickerbocker Rules and modifications that helped lead to the modern format of baseball games. Among the items formalized were the length of games and the distance between bases.

At the convention, multiple members of the New York Knickerbockers club presented the "Laws of Base Ball", a series of documents that contained proposed rules, some of which were edited in response to feedback. The law documents drafted for the convention survived and were sold at auction for more than $3 million in 2016.

== Background ==
After the pioneering New York Knickerbockers club was founded in 1845, baseball grew slowly at first in the New York City area. However, by 1855 it had started to accelerate in popularity, as two dozen teams were in existence that year. The nature of games played between the teams changed during the period. While early Knickerbockers games functioned mainly as social events that allowed players to exercise and fraternize with other players, by 1855, competitive match games had grown more frequent. As a result, the existing rules proved inadequate in addressing various situations that arose in competitive play.

While opposing teams agreed upon their own match rules, which led to changes in common practices, a uniform code of regulations was lacking. Even items such as the types of balls and bats to be used were not standardized. The rules also had aspects that could be taken advantage of in unintended ways that went against the spirit of the game. Meanwhile, new clubs often wrote into sports columns in newspapers asking for clarifications on rules. Another factor driving the push was the general improvement of fielding skills, which at the time was the most crucial aspect of the game.

The original Knickerbocker Rules, which the Knickerbockers used for internal play, dated back to 1845, with small adjustments made three years later. Following an 1854 meeting involving three teams—the Eagles, Gothams, and Knickerbockers—a set of match play guidelines were coded to address rules differences between the clubs. One year later, with the increase in match play accelerating, the idea of a convention addressing the rules was floated, but the Knickerbockers were not involved in the efforts, which proved futile. By 1856, the Knickerbockers were ready to participate, and in December of that year a call for a convention was made. Historian William Ryczek wrote that "the Knicks, Eagles and Gothams realized they could no longer decide the fate of the game among themselves."

== Convention and creation of Laws documents ==
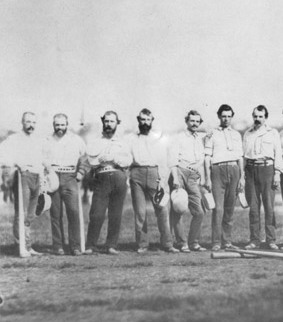
The New York Knickerbockers (spearheaded by Doc Adams - fourth from the left), pictured in 1859, took the lead in organizing the convention.

The Knickerbockers took the lead in organizing the convention, as the team held an internal meeting on December 6, 1856. It formed a three-man committee led by Doc Adams to accomplish the task of gaining attendance from New York City-area clubs. Sixteen clubs agreed to participate in the convention, which was held over at least two sessions. The first took place on January 22, 1857, while the second was held about a month later, on February 25. Press advertisements indicated that a session would be held on February 3, but no records of any committee activities having taken place on that date are known to exist. Of the 16 clubs, 14 sent representatives to the first meeting. The other two teams sent members to the second session, but not all representatives from the first session returned. As a result, neither session had attendance from every team.

At the January 22 meeting of the convention, which was held in a Broome Street hotel, each of the 14 attending clubs sent three delegates. The teams started by naming officers; Adams was selected as president. A handful of other officers from varying teams were named. The convention saw the Knickerbockers present a series of documents collectively titled the "Laws of Base Ball", which had been drafted in 1856. Adams probably wrote one of the documents himself, according to historian John Thorn, while fellow Knickerbocker William Grenelle contributed a second Laws paper and a document titled "Rules for Match Games of Base Ball", which contained playing ground guidelines not addressed elsewhere. The papers were then edited and put together prior to the convention. Some of the papers Grenelle contributed have visible penciled changes, from a different writer; Thorn believes that Adams made the edits. The Knickerbockers did not initially gain approval for the drafts; instead, a rules committee was appointed to meet on January 28; the attending clubs each sent one delegate. Other items discussed at the first meeting included the possibility of a baseball field being built in Central Park, which led to the appointment of a five-member lobbying committee, and the delegates voted to charge clubs a $2 assessment.

When the rules committee met on January 28, William H. Van Cott, a member of the Gothams, was named chairman. The Knickerbockers' proposal was discussed, and a final draft was made to present during the second full meeting of the committee. Some of the items were amended after floor motions, but the resulting version was ultimately approved.

== Rules and regulations ==
=== Game length ===
One of the major items addressed in the Laws was the prescribed length of games. Under the Knickerbocker Rules, games did not have a set number of innings, instead concluding when a team reached 21 runs. This method left potential issues regarding match play, as was evidenced by an 1856 game between the Knickerbockers and the Empire club; each team scored 21 runs over eight innings and the game ended in a tie. This was not the only factor that threatened to prevent matches from having winners. As match play became more widespread in the mid-1850s, teams improved and contests became closer and lower-scoring in nature. Under practices of the time, in the event that neither team scored 21 runs before darkness or inclement weather forced a stoppage of play, a game ended in a draw. Teams seeking to play for a stalemate could easily do so by not swinging at pitches, as no system of calling balls and strikes existed. One list of 55 games played in 1856 showed 11 draws, which led Porter's magazine to write that the situation had led to "the disgust of parties who have gone into the field for an afternoon's recreation."

The "Match Games" document originally indicated that games should last 12 innings, but the number was changed to nine during editing. The issue resulted in a divide between the Knickerbockers and club delegates Adams and Louis Wadsworth; the team had supported seven-inning games, but Adams and Wadsworth sought longer contests. Although Porter's stated that the shorter game length had won support at the convention, nine-inning games were decided upon, following a motion by Wadsworth. Also in the rules was a provision that, should a game be suspended due to weather, the leading team would be declared the winner if five innings had been played; these new rules served to remove the possibility of draws.

=== Field dimensions ===
The convention also brought clarity to the topic of the distance between bases. Previously, the distance had been listed as 42 paces between first base and third base, and from second base to home plate. The actual distance depended upon the definition of "pace"; a two-and-a-half foot pace would have resulted in a distance of around 75 feet, while a person actually pacing out the steps could lead to inconsistencies. Adams later wrote that the pre-existing standard "was rather vague". In the Rules document, he and Grenelle changed the definition of a baseball field to focus on the overall basepath. The first page of Rules prescribed a 42-yard distance between first and third bases, and second base and home plate, which would have resulted in bases being 89.1 feet apart. Before the convention, a change was made that Thorn called "a small step, but one of simple genius". The distance between bases was set at 90 feet, leaving 127 feet between second base and home plate.

In the Laws document, Adams also took a step to provide more precise specifications for how far the pitcher would stand from home plate. While the laws originally called for a distance of 15 to 16 yards, depending on where the pitcher decided to stand, he changed the document to set the distance at 45 feet. Dating back to 1854, the previous regulations had merely called for the pitcher to be "not less than fifteen paces" from home plate, leaving open the possibility of pitchers positioning themselves off-center when throwing. To restrict the possible location, section 5 of the rules specified that the position be inside "a line four yard in length, drawn at right angles to a line from home to the second base, having a center upon that line". As had been the case in 1845 rules, the document provided that balks could be called against pitchers, subject to the judgement of umpires, which would result in all baserunners moving up one base. One field regulation likely added due to input from the convention floor was a regulation restricting where batters could stand. It prevented batters from standing behind home plate; had the committee's draft not been tweaked, weakly hit balls would have had a greater chance of being foul balls.

=== Equipment ===
Early baseball bats could be either round or flat. Section 2 of the Laws document mandated the use of round bats, which were to be made of wood and limited to a maximum diameter of two inches. The Knickerbockers' original draft had permitted one side of the bat to be shaved flat in a manner similar to a cricket bat, which according to the document was meant to allow for improved aiming on batted balls. For unknown reasons, this part of the draft failed to make it through the rules committee.

The rules also addressed the size of the baseball, calling for balls to be between 6 and 6.5 ounces in weight, and between 10 and 10.25 inches in circumference. Both sets of numbers were increased from the 1854 rules, although balls meeting the older guidelines ended up closer to modern equivalents.

=== Gambling ban and player regulations ===
A surge in interest from gamblers, as well as the existence of loopholes for clubs to take advantage of existing player eligibility regulations, led to responses in the 1857 rules. A new addition in the Laws documents, in section 30, was a ban on gambling by players or umpires. This served to discourage gambling by involved parties, although fan wagers were not mentioned in the guideline. However, section 33 banned bystanders from talking with players or umpires during play, unless by request of an umpire.

In addition, the rules stated that players were required to be members of their clubs for 30 days before appearing in a game, and that they could play for only one team. These changes were made to avert a repeat of an 1856 game between the Gothams and Knickerbockers in which the Gothams had fielded a player who was a member of the Union Club at the same time, leading to protests by the Knickerbockers and criticism from the Union Club. The customs of the day favored teams fielding nine-player squads in match games, although it was not specifically prescribed in existing rules and some games played outside the New York City area saw varying numbers of players. Section 27 of the Laws codified the nine-player guideline, going against the wishes of the Knickerbockers, who had wanted the minimum player number set at seven.

=== Failed proposals ===
Along with player and inning numbers, another item supported by the Knickerbockers that failed to make it past the rules committee was the "fly game", in which fielders who caught a batted ball on the fly would record an out, but not those who made a catch after the first bounce. Under regulations of the time, an out was posted when a batted ball was caught after one bounce; this was known as the bound rule. Adams himself was a strong proponent of the proposal. The Knickerbockers proposed a compromise in which the fly game would apply to fair balls, but foul balls could be caught on a hop. The committee rejected the proposal, leaving the bound game intact. Newer clubs opposed the change due to a fear that fielders would wind up with hand injuries. They were joined by some established teams, as neither the Eagles nor Gotham backed the change. As part of the rules passed, baserunners were prohibited from advancing on balls caught on the fly; modern guidelines that allowed runners to tag up were not introduced until 1859. Porter's had endorsed adding a regulation that would allow umpires to call strikes on batters "who did not swing at good pitches", but this also failed to gain a consensus.

== Aftermath ==
The "Laws of Base Ball" have been described by historian William Hershberger as "the direct ancestor of modern baseball." Items such as the nine-inning standard game length, 90-foot distance between bases, and number of players addressed in the laws carried forward and remain in use in baseball, forming the structure of the modern sport. The distance from the pitcher to home plate was extended two times after 1857; the second adjustment came in 1893.

In March 1858, yet another meeting of clubs was held. There, as Adams wrote, "the annual convention was declared a permanent organization, and with the requisite constitution and by-laws", the National Association of Base Ball Players was formed. That year, another significant change was made to the rules, as called strikes were added. The adjustment, along with the addition of called balls in 1863, made the pitcher a more significant factor than in previous years. The fly game was debated for another seven years after 1857 before a one-year trial was adopted in 1864 for balls hit in fair territory. The rule, which was expanded to cover foul balls in 1883, remains in use in modern baseball.

=== Document sales ===
Twenty-three pages from the "Laws" draft documents survived, having been kept by Grenelle's family. In 1999, they were sold as part of a lot of vintage documents for $12,650. At the time, the authorship was not known. In 2015, the buyer came forward to SCP Auctions, and analysis revealed the documents' authorship and significance. At an online auction the following year, the documents sold for over $3.2 million, the most that baseball-related papers had ever gone for at the time and more than three times what the auction house had estimated. In 2018–2019, the Laws appeared in a Library of Congress exhibition, having been loaned by Hayden Trubitt. Since May 2026, by virtue of a long-term loan from Trubitt, the documents have been on display at the National Baseball Hall of Fame and Museum in Cooperstown, New York as part of the museum's "The Rules of Base Ball" exhibit.

== Bibliography ==
- Hershberger, Richard (Spring 2013). "The Base Ball Convention of 1857". Base Ball: A Journal of the Early Game. 7 (1): 28–44. doi:10.3172/BB.7.28. ISSN 1934-2802.
- Morris, Peter (2008). But Didn't We Have Fun?: An Informal History of Baseball's Pioneer Era, 1843–1870. Chicago: Ivan R. Dee. ISBN 978-1-56663-849-4.
- Ryczek, William J. (2009). Baseball's First Inning: A History of the National Pastime Through the Civil War. Jefferson, North Carolina: McFarland & Company. ISBN 978-0-7864-4194-5.
- Thorn, John (2011). Baseball in the Garden of Eden: The Secret History of the Early Game. New York City: Simon & Schuster. ISBN 978-0-7432-9403-4.
- Thorn, John (2015). "The Making of Baseball's Magna Carta". Base Ball: A Journal of the Early Game. 9 (1): 90–100. ISSN 1934-2802.
