= Charles Schuyler De Bost =

American baseball player (1826–1895)

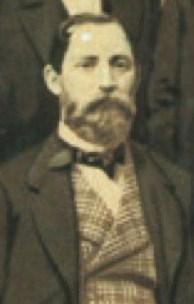
De Bost in 1862

Charles Schuyler De Bost (August 5, 1826 – May 26, 1895) was an American baseball pioneer, who was a player and director with the New York Knickerbockers from 1845 to 1859.

== Knickerbocker Base Ball Club ==
De Bost played his first game for the Knickerbockers on October 31, 1845. While he left the club in 1847, he rejoined the team on June 14, 1850, and would stay until his final game in 1859. He was primarily used as a catcher, and was considered amongst the best catchers of his era. He also served as club director for a time.

De Bost is buried in Green-Wood Cemetery in Brooklyn, New York.
