= Elysian Fields (Hoboken, New Jersey) =

Recreational parkland in New Jersey, US

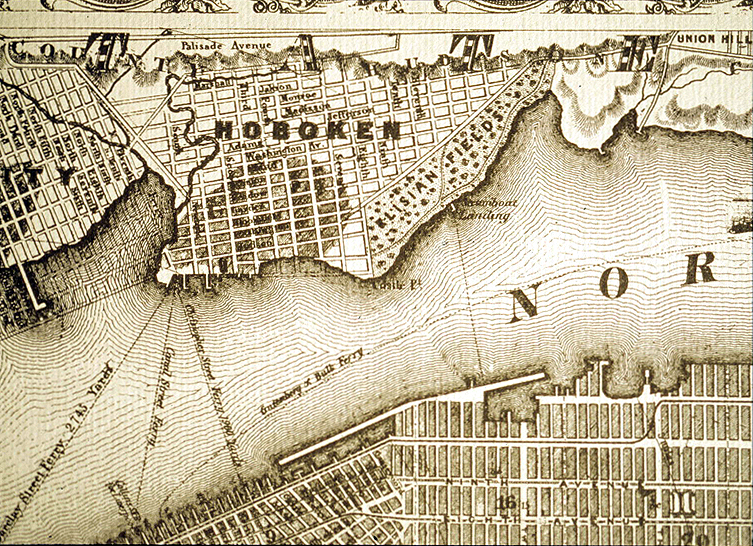
1854 map showing location of Elysian Fields

The Elysian Fields in Hoboken, New Jersey, was recreational parkland located on the city's northern riverfront in the 19th century. The area was a popular getaway destination for New Yorkers in the 19th century, much in the tradition of the pleasure garden, offering open space for several sports, public spectacles, and amusements. The lavish grounds hosted the Colonnade Hotel and tavern, and offered picnic areas, a spa known as Sybil's Cave, river walks, nature paths, fishing, a miniature railroad, rides and races, and a ferry landing, which also served as a launch for boating competitions.

The Elysian Fields was the site of countless baseball matches between amateur clubs based in New Jersey, Manhattan, and Brooklyn in the pre-professional era of the 1830s to the 1870s. Cricket matches were also popular at the grounds, and the New York Yacht Club established quarters at the Fields.

The grounds extended south to north roughly from present day 8th Street to the southern edge of what is now Weehawken, and west to east from Washington Street to the Hudson River. It was established in the 1820s and 1830s on land owned by Col. John Stevens III and his family.

Historian Tom Gilbert said, "The Elysian Fields [was] a kind of laboratory of transportation, leisure and recreation. Disneyland, Central Park, Coney Island and the modern baseball park can all claim the Elysian Fields as an ancestor."

== Early history of the area ==
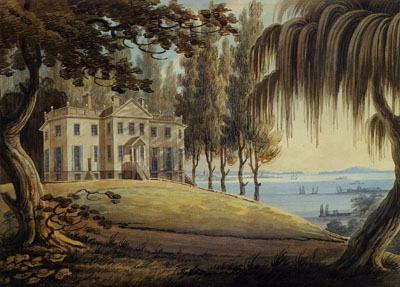
Watercolor painting of the Stevens Villa, 1808

Originally called "Hobuck Island," the area had in the 18th century been an estate owned by the politically prominent Bayard family. Because William Bayard was a British loyalist during the Revolutionary War, after America achieved independence the land was confiscated and sold at public auction. Col. Stevens acquired the estate in 1783. In 1788, Stevens bought another 125 acres in the rural area known as Weehawken. With these real estate purchases, Stevens owned more than a mile of Hudson River frontage. In the early 19th century, the Stevens property in Weehawken acquired notoriety as "The Dueling Ground," where New Yorkers went to settle disputes with pistols, because dueling was outlawed in their state. It was on these grounds that Aaron Burr fatally shot Alexander Hamilton in 1804.

The Stevens family lived in a villa atop Castle Point, a bluff that overlooked the Hudson, surrounded by lavishly landscaped property. "[The] gardens eventually boasted many vegetables and fruit trees, and hundreds of varieties of flowering shrubs, coffee plants, and exotic plants such as yucca," according to Hoboken historian Melissa Abernathy.

At the time, the rest of Hoboken was largely an undeveloped, mosquito-infested swamp. There was also an abundance of turtles to be found—the swampy wetlands were known as "Turtle Grove"—and this led to the founding, in 1796, of The Hoboken Turtle Club (see illustration below). According to a story published by the Penn Museum, "The Club became a venerable part of the local culinary landscape and continued throughout its existence to offer turtle soup and turtle steak dinners to its members."

In the 1820s, the Stevens family began to drain the swamp and fill nearby marshes. The family, who shared interests in engineering, invention, sports, real estate, and business, began to envision the waterfront area below their estate as a combination recreational/pleasure resort for New Yorkers looking to escape from the city during sweltering summers and on weekends.

In 1824, before the full development of the landscape surrounding Castle Point, Col. Stevens offered to sell the site to the city of New York for use as a public park. (This was decades before the creation of Central Park.) After the proposed sale was rejected by the city of New York, Col. Stevens decided to finish the project himself.

== Development of the grounds ==
Stevens described the newly developed parkland as a "place of general resort for citizens, as well as strangers, for health and recreation". He further boasted that the grounds were "easily accessible, and ... in a few minutes the dust, noise, and bad smells of the city may be exchanged for the pure air, delightful shades, and completely rural scenery." Historian Tom Gilbert wrote:

In 1829 Hoboken's permanent population reached 500. Two years later the Stevenses expanded and upgraded their pleasure grounds to raise the tone and appeal to the discriminating emerging urban bourgeoisie. This is when they began using the name "Elysian Fields," after the paradise of classical mythology where earthly heroes somehow spent a blissful eternity .... The wooded section north of the Castle Point site of the Stevenses' Italianate villa was cleared and landscaped.

In 1831, the New York Commercial Advertiser printed the following account:

[We] visited yesterday afternoon the Elysian Fields, as the now cleared and beautiful groves and lawns in the vicinity of what was formerly known as Turtle Grove, have been called by the enterprising owners. The name, if trite, is apt. The change from the wild state of these woods and banks to their present condition, has been magical. The Hamadryads, it is true, have perished in great numbers, and the Sylvans retired to other nooks, where the solitary lover of nature may still explore their haunts. It was impossible that these shores and groves, along which there is one of the finest walks in the world, should remain forever in their rude state, so near the crowded city. The business of reform fell happily into good hands. Nature has been tamed, not violated; and our citizens have reasons to thank the owners of this property, while they boast of having, so near their wilderness of brick and mortar, a place of resort for health and recreation.

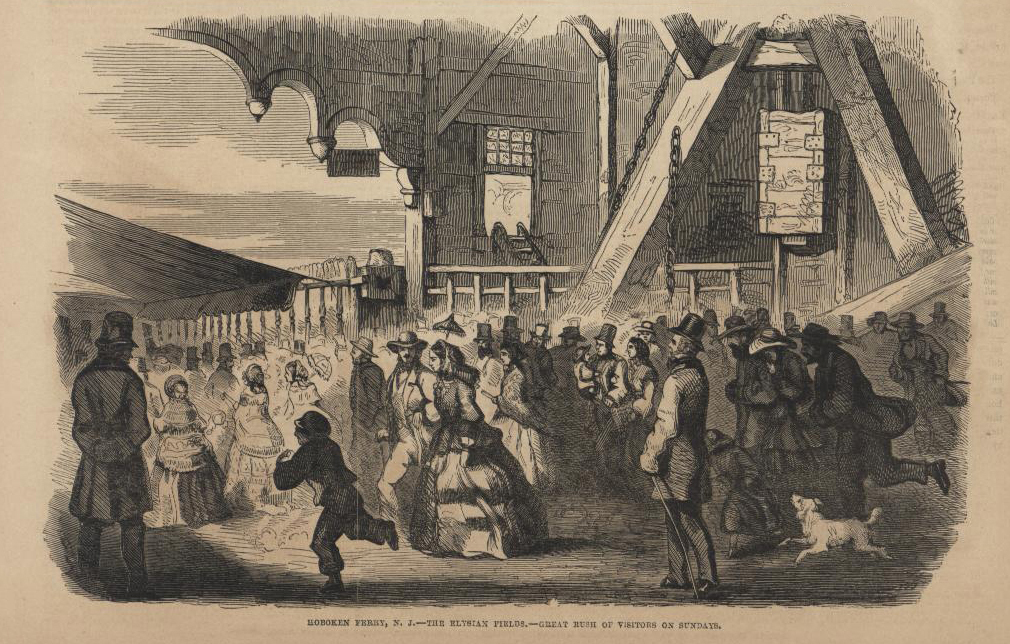
Visitors from New York arriving at the Elysian Fields on the Hoboken Ferry, 1856 (from Leslie's Weekly)

The Elysian Fields became a popular destination for city-weary New Yorkers, with ferries to the grounds originating at Barclay, Canal, and Christopher Streets. "From the opening of the 'River Walk' to the public in about 1810, until the Civil War," wrote historian William Mann, "New Yorkers flocked to the Elysian Fields in the summer months. Among the luminaries that history records as visitors were Charles Dickens, Edgar Allan Poe, Martin Van Buren, Daniel Webster, and Washington Irving. Descriptions of the place were made by many of the park's visitors, including [William Cullen] Bryant, Mrs. Frances Trollope, Frances Kemble, and scores of lesser-known writers." During its midcentury heyday, the grounds drew upwards of 20,000 visitors on weekends, and proved a financial bonanza for the family of Col. Stevens. According to Gilbert:

The Stevenses' pleasure grounds ... became New York City's main playground for much of the 19th century. It provided New Yorkers with something their government could not or would not provide, ample green park space, including grounds for baseball, cricket, and other sports—for free. One by one, the top New York City baseball clubs gravitated to Hoboken. And the Stevenses' pleasure grounds helped sell a lot of real estate. ... John Stevens's real estate sales and the Hoboken Land and Improvement Company, formed in 1838 and owned by Colonel Stevens's son Edwin, made an astronomical amount of money. When Edwin Stevens died in 1868 the real estate company's holdings were valued at $20 million, a figure that did not include the Elysian Fields and other waterfront land worth an additional $15 million, for a total of $35 million.

John Thorn, the Official Historian of Major League Baseball, explained that the encouragement of baseball at Elysian Fields had commercial implications for the Stevens family:

[P]roprietor Edwin Augustus Stevens (in conjunction with his brothers) had already donated the use of his grounds to the New York Cricket Club and the New York Yacht Club, and had offered liberal lease terms to the Magnolia and New York baseball clubs. In this support of sport, Stevens was of course encouraging traffic to the Elysian Fields: he controlled the ferries as well as the resort, which included the Beacon Course, a horse-racing track opened in 1834. By encouraging play (and gambling) on his turf and along his waters, he created a long-standing model for "traction magnates" to own baseball clubs.

The Stevens villa was destroyed in a fire in the early 1850s, and was replaced by a castle in 1854.

== Baseball and cricket ==
While the city of Hoboken boasts that the Elysian grounds were the "birthplace" of baseball in 1846, this is a myth. There were countless baseball clubs and games played during the 1830s, if not earlier—in Hoboken, New York City, Brooklyn, and elsewhere—and the first rules were drawn up by the Gotham Club of New York in 1837. Nonetheless, while Hoboken cannot claim to be "the cradle of baseball", it has historic standing for its pivotal role in the early game as it evolved from a pleasant leisure time pursuit to a highly competitive—and commercial—spectator sport.

The Knickerbocker Club of New York City, which was founded in September 1845, is often cited as the first club to play baseball anywhere, and that their first game took place in Hoboken in 1846. However, a number of clubs played amateur baseball at the Elysian Fields before the Knickerbockers. John Thorn writes that the Magnolia Ball Club (Note: The largely overlooked Magnolias were a more rough-and-tumble, lower-class outfit than the reputedly genteel clubs manned by the "respectable classes", e.g., the Knickerbockers. SABR historians are researching this fascinating club, with chronicles likely to appear soon. At such time, once again the conventional accounts of baseball's evolution are likely to be reevaluated.) and the New York Club (a.k.a. the Gothams) were known to have played at the Elysian Fields in the autumn of 1843. (Both clubs also played in New York City.) Baseball historian Bill Ryczek notes, "For many years, the origin of New York baseball was attributed to the Knickerbockers, who left an exhaustive trail of documentation, including scorebooks, minutes of their many meetings, and endless detail of their petty arguments and mundane tasks. In recent years many scholars, most prominently the indefatigable John Thorn, have proved to us that there were New York clubs that preceded the Knickerbockers but lacked their propensity to painstakingly record their deeds for posterity."

By 1845, rapid urban development was claiming open spaces across the Hudson River in New York, prompting the Knickerbockers to choose the Elysian Fields, which was a 15-minute ferry ride from lower Manhattan, as their home grounds. In an un-bylined reminiscence, attributed to "an old pioneer" (later identified as Knickerbocker founding member William Wheaton), published in the San Francisco Examiner in 1887, the origins of the club and the playing fields in Hoboken were described:

The new game quickly became very popular with New Yorkers, and the numbers of the club soon swelled beyond the fastidious notions of some of us, and we decided to withdraw and found a new organization, which we called the Knickerbocker. For a playground we chose the Elysian fields of Hoboken, just across the Hudson river. And those fields were truly Elysian to us in those days. There was a broad, firm greensward, fringed with fine shady trees, where we could recline during intervals, when waiting for a strike [i.e., a turn at bat], and take a refreshing rest.

On June 19, 1846, the Knickerbockers faced off against the New York Ball Club. (Both clubs were offshoots of an earlier club, the New York Gothams.) This match is historically considered the first fully documented baseball game. Countless games had preceded this matchup; 37 prior matches at the Elysian Fields alone occurring before June 19, 1846, have been documented at Protoball.org. The Knickerbockers were simply the first to compile and preserve a batter-by-batter account of the action (arguably the game's first "scorecard"). In this match, New York defeated the Knickerbockers 23-1 in four innings. (It is worth noting that the Knickerbockers rarely challenged opposing clubs. "From 1845 through 1850, the club played over 200 games," wrote Tom Gilbert, "but only three of these were against other clubs. The rest were intramural games played between impromptu lineups made up of Knickerbocker members.")

By the late 1850s, several of the premiere Manhattan-based member clubs of the amateur National Association of Base Ball Players, including the Gothams, Eagles, and Empires, as well as the Knickerbockers, were using the Elysian grounds as their home field. The Mutual Club of New York made the Elysian grounds their home field in 1857; in 1865 they renovated a diamond and added stands to accommodate spectators.

The New York Cricket Club was organized at McCarty's Hotel (the Colonnade—see below) on October 11, 1843. St. George's Cricket Club, which was formed in Manhattan in 1839, made the Elysian Fields their home grounds in the 1850s. In 1859, an international cricket match was held at the Elysian grounds with an All England Eleven as part of an English tour of North America.

Pioneering sports journalist Henry Chadwick, then a cricket reporter for The New York Times, regularly attended baseball matches at the Elysian Fields in the 1850s. (Many athletes of this era excelled at both sports.) "After watching a particularly spirited contest between the Gotham and Eagle clubs of New York on the grassy grounds of Elysian Fields in Hoboken," wrote Chadwick biographer Andrew Schiff, "Chadwick came away a changed man." He became one of baseball's earliest and most vocal proponents, writing regularly about the sport for the next 50 years. Chadwick was eventually inducted into the Baseball Hall of Fame. Chadwick recalled:

"I chanced to go through the Elysian Fields during the progress of a match between the noted Eagle and Gotham Clubs. The game was being sharply played on both sides, and I watched with deeper interest than any previous ball match between clubs that I had seen. It was not long before I was struck with the idea that base ball was just the game for Americans."

Chadwick's epiphany was not isolated—it was during this decade that newspapers began to carry accounts of local games. In fact, according to Tom Gilbert, "Clubs made up of newspapermen played at the Elysian Fields in the 1850s and 1860s; in 1871 a baseball diamond was set aside for them exclusively."

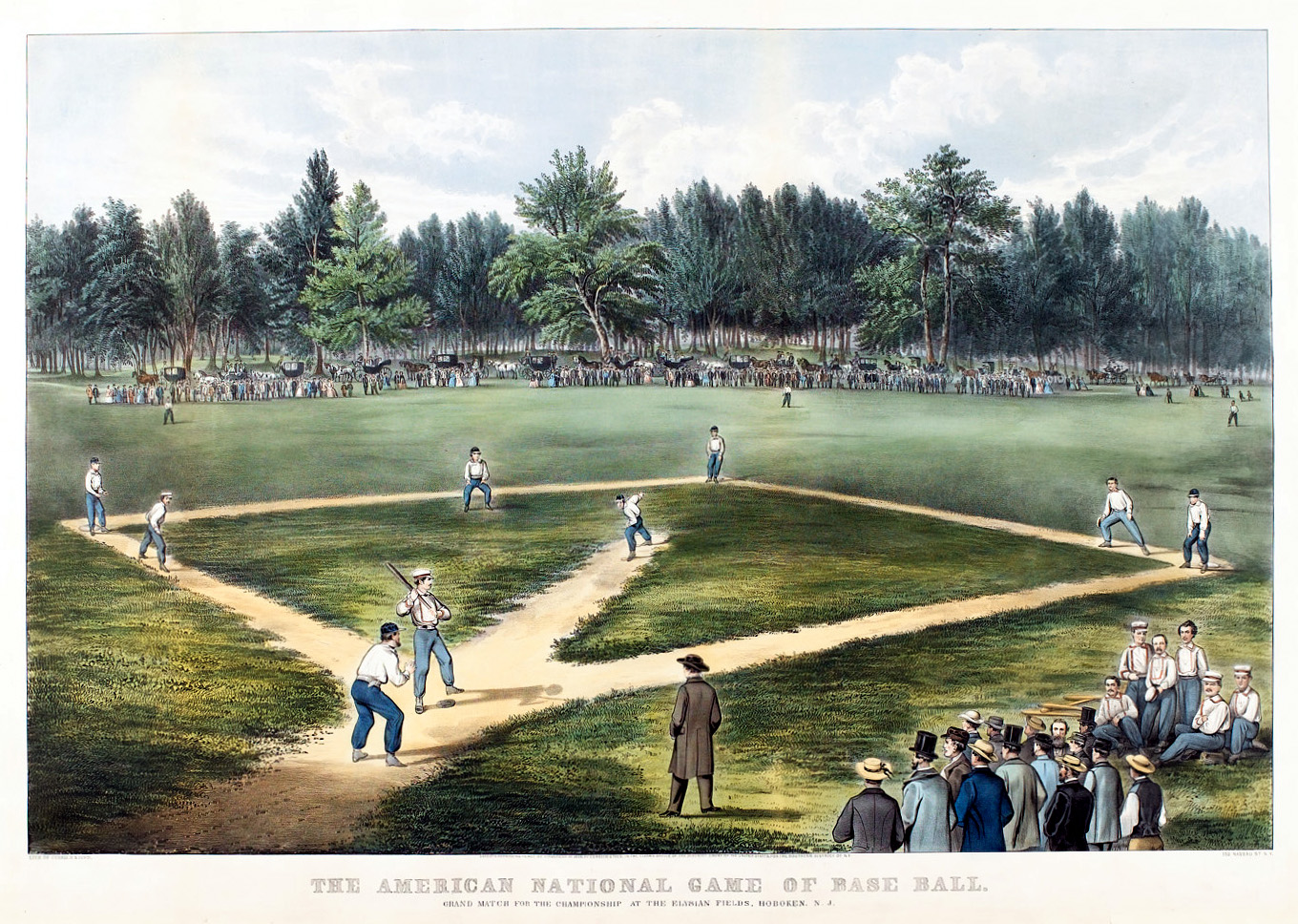
Apocryphal baseball game played at Elysian Fields, Hoboken (Currier & Ives lithograph)

In 1865, the Elysian grounds hosted a championship baseball match between the Mutuals and the Atlantic Club of Brooklyn that was attended by an estimated 20,000 fans. The event was long-believed to have been immortalized in a Currier & Ives lithograph, The American National Game of Base Ball. However, historians eventually acknowledged that the lithograph does not reflect a journalistic portrayal of the 1865 game, the Mutual and Atlantic players, or the Elysian Fields; it is a "fantasy" portrayal of an 1860 match between the Excelsiors and the Atlantic that never occurred.

In 1870, hooligans frequently attempted to disrupt amateur matches. As reported in the New York Clipper in 1871, "Last season crowds of roughs used to gather there every evening and annoy the regular ball players so much that finally the Hoboken authorities interfered and put a stop to ball playing except by clubs having special permission from the city authorities. ... [T]he south field has been engaged for the season by the Knickerbocker, Eagle and Social Clubs, and no other clubs will be permitted to use the field. On the north field the Gothams [and] the Columbia College Club [will play]. ... The western field has been set apart for the Saturday games of the newspaper nines."

Baseball was played at the Elysian Fields for about 50 years, although the date of the last recorded game is unknown. Just about all games played at the grounds were amateur matchups. (Note: The Cincinnati Red Stockings were the first openly professional team, barnstorming through the 1869 and 1870 seasons. However, baseball historians acknowledge that high-quality players were financially compensated off the books or given no-show municipal jobs throughout the 1860s, including many players and teams who used the Elysian Fields.) The last known published reference to a baseball game played at the Elysian Fields occurred in 1889; the Jersey City News, of September 4, 1889, carried a report of a September 2 game between the Jersey of Hoboken and the Palisades of North Hudson. In 1890 and thereafter, no known newspaper references to baseball games at the Elysian Fields have been found. This is not surprising since by the early 1890s, the Elysian Fields had been carved up by urban development and only a few patches of parkland remained.

The only documented professional games played on the Elysian grounds occurred in 1888 between black (Negro league) teams as part of a series of championship matches.

== Colonnade Hotel ==
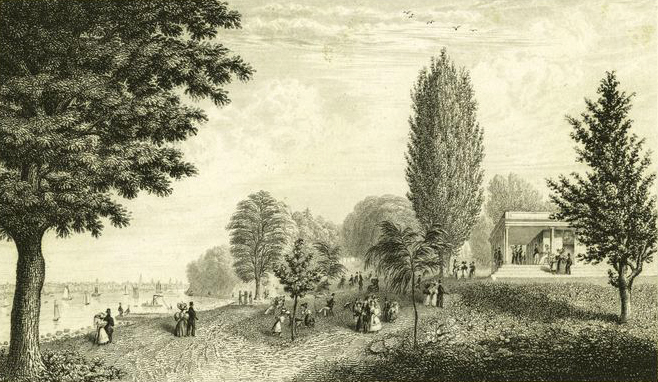
Etching of Elysian Fields by artist Archibald Dick, 1831, depicting Colonnade Hotel at right

In 1830, the Stevens family erected near Turtle Cove a Grecian-style pavilion, known as the Colonnade, which opened for business in 1831. Stevens boasted that it was "devoted largely to the worship of Bacchus" (drinking and revelry). There was already a tavern on the premises, the "large commodious '76 House," or "Tavern on the Knoll," an inn situated on the sloping lawn between the ferry dock and Stevens mansion. The Colonnade's "white front and Doric pillars made it an impressive edifice." The Colonnade appears prominently in countless 19th century illustrations of activities at the Elysian Fields. It was one of the favorite hangouts of ball players after the conclusion of games.

Irish-born Michael McCarty became proprietor in 1841, and the venue became so closely identified with him that it was often referred to as McCarty's Hotel. (It was also casually known as the "Pavilion.") "For special events," as recounted in Base Ball Founders, "he set up stages or pavilions around the hotel so that patrons could eat or drink to their heart's content while enjoying the scenery." McCarty joined the Knickerbocker Club and played in at least one of their baseball games.

On March 3, 1852, McCarty fatally shot himself while bird-hunting; newspapers reported his death as an accident, but the nature of the fatal wound indicated an apparent suicide. The Colonnade continued to operate for years under a series of new owners, many of whom renamed the hotel. In the 1880s it was known as Charles W. Roedenburg's lager beer saloon.

The building was torn down, most likely in 1893. (A November 1893 article in the New York Herald claimed, "The old hotel was demolished but a short time ago.")

== Sybil's Cave ==
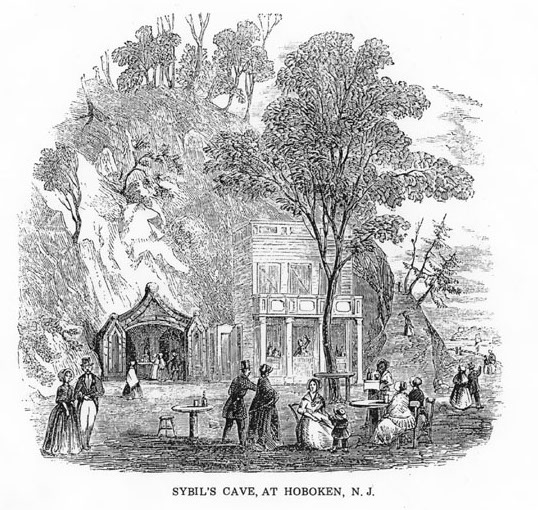
Sybil's Cave, illustration from Gleason's Pictorial, June 19, 1852

The spa Sybil's Cave was excavated around 1832 by Hoboken's founder, Col. John Stevens III, and adorned with a gothic-style stone arch. Named after the ancient Greco-Roman prophetesses, from the 1840s through the 1880s it was one of Hoboken's biggest tourist attractions for the allegedly healthful magnesium-infused water that supposedly flowed from a spring within the cave. From the mid- to late-1800s, glasses of this water were sold for a penny.

"The Stevenses carved out an old iron mine to create the Sybil's Cave, a fake grotto that functioned as a folly and refreshment stand," wrote Tom Gilbert. "Here visitors strolling along the river walk stopped to buy water that supposedly came from a spring in the cave, and supposedly had health-giving properties. A wink to the waiter would bring you hard liquor instead."

The cave gained national notoriety in 1841 when the body of a young cigar shop worker, Mary Cecilia Rogers, washed ashore nearby, an incident that inspired Edgar Allan Poe's The Mystery of Marie Rogêt, one of the first true crime detective novels.

== Other features ==
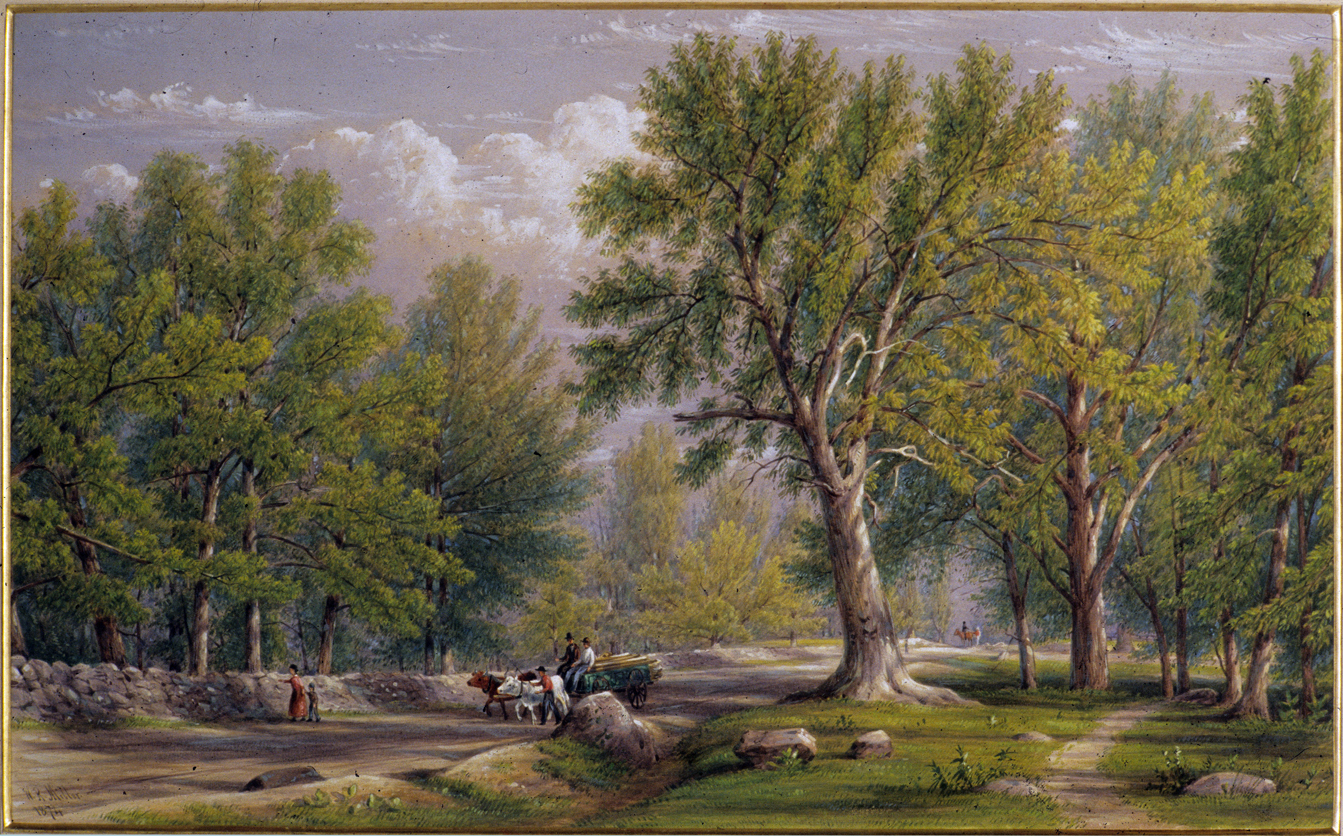
1874 watercolor rendering of the Elysian Fields, by artist William Rickarby Miller

In the 1830s, a tribe of Native-American Penobscots arrived from Maine to entertain and sell handmade merchandise. For over a decade they staged "Indian dances," held canoe races, and sold fine handwoven baskets to tourists. Jugglers, rope dancers, musicians, and magicians performed amid the crowds, and there were carnival rides and culinary delicacies in abundance. Liquor flowed freely and tobacco fumes were everywhere. "Among the entertaining features that Colonel Stevens installed on the Green near his ferry dock," wrote Mann, "were a primitive Ferris Wheel, a merry-go-round, a ten-pin alley, wax figures, a camera obscura, and a flying machine, or as Stevens called it, a "Whirligig"."

At the north end of the ground was a deer park and a horse "Trotting Course." Stevens, who was infatuated with speed, owned racehorses and lobbied for the New Jersey legislature to legitimize horse-racing. His interest in speedy steeds was linked to his determination to operate the fastest stage coaches in New Jersey—in fact, he fancied a monopoly on carrying the U.S. mail. The Stevenses maintained a stable and stud service in partnership with the Livingstons and Dr. Hosack. According to Col. Stevens' wife, Rachel, "The old set continue their daily visits to The Green and amuse themselves with talking and looking at their race horses ... all as happy as lords."

A riot sparked by a disrupted boxing match took place in Hoboken in 1835. Because of this and a rougher clientele frequenting the recreation spots, in 1836 the New York Herald was ready to declare the impending demise of the town's shorefront and the Elysian Fields:

The character of Hoboken is gone forever. It is now as bad as the Five Points—as dirty and drunken as Walnut street—and as riotous as the Burnt District during the strikes. Its beautiful arbors are filled with cigar-smoking blackguards—its serpentine walks crowded with drunken vagabonds—its sea shore resounds only to all the graces of Billingsgate, and the swearing of a man of war. No gentleman—no lady—no decent—no respectable people go there. It is the rendezvous for loafers, pickpockets, filles de joie, thieves, burglars, and Thomas street fashionables. The Hoboken boats are just as filthy and disagreeable as Hoboken itself. The Canal street steamer, the other day, was so crammed with loafers that it almost capsized. The Elysian Fields have been turned into a perfect and unapproachable Hell. Their drinkables are poisons, and their milk punch death.

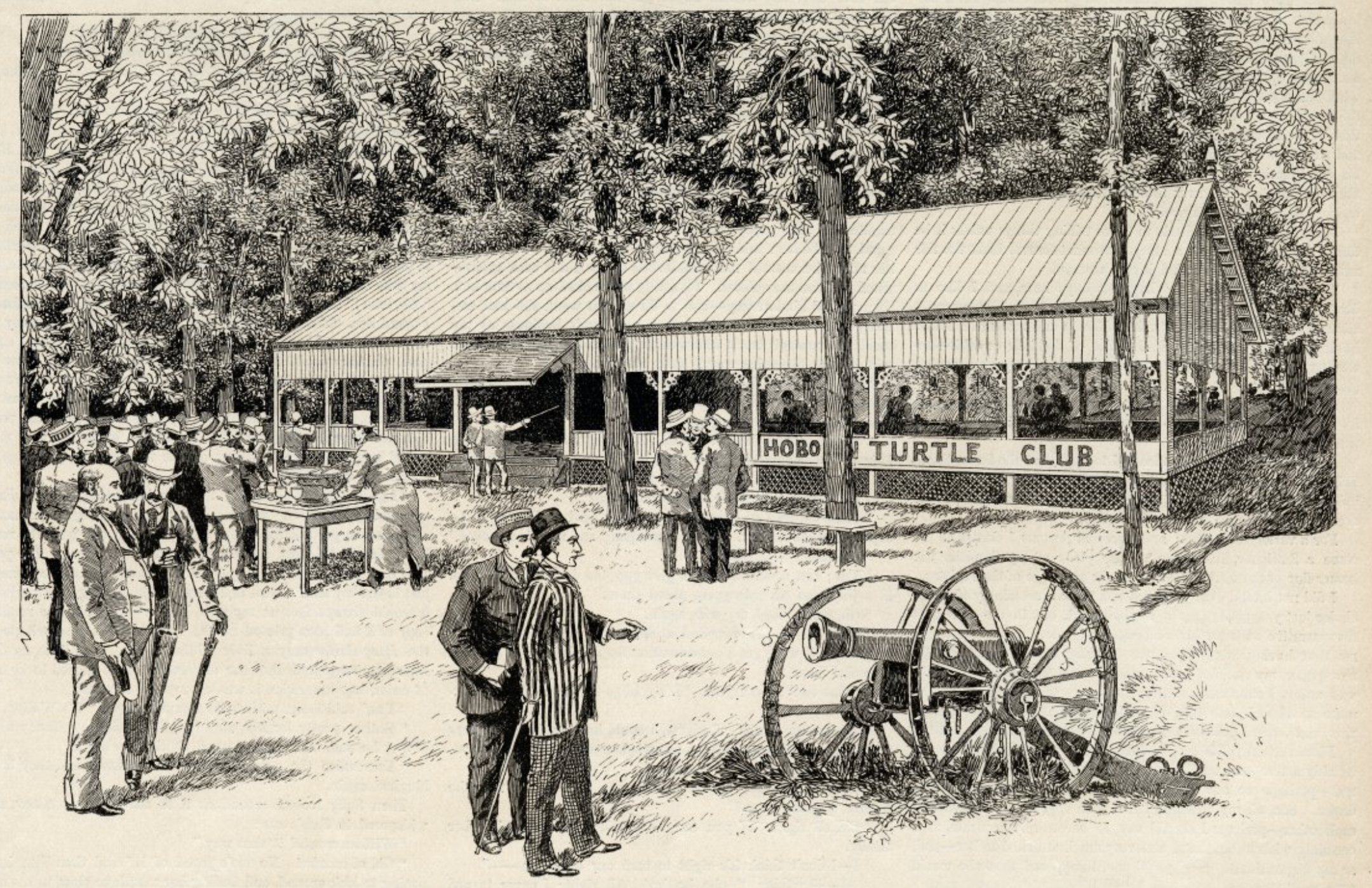
The Hoboken Turtle Club, based at the Elysian Fields, from Frank Leslie's Illustrated Newspaper, September 7, 1889

As a result of such incidents and the consequent negative publicity, attendance at the grounds began to fall in the mid-1830s. "During the last years of Colonel Stevens' life [he died in 1838]," wrote Mann, "his park began its gradual decline—a fact hard to imagine for the student of baseball who assumes the park and the game flourished in tandem." To counter potential economic reversals, "Stevens staged events, such as musical concerts, ox roasts, Indian war dances, sideshow acts, bare-knuckle boxing matches, sailboat races, hot-air balloon demonstrations, and oratory competitions." At this stage, the Elysian Fields still had another three decades of popularity and recreational activity ahead, but the grounds were becoming increasingly disreputable. The Elysian Fields' tree-lined groves gained notoriety as "lovers' paths," where couples could discreetly express the sort of physical affection generally frowned upon in public. In 1844, New York lawyer/musician George Templeton Strong lamented in a (posthumously published) diary entry,

Hoboken's a good deal cut up and built up, but pleasant still; pity it's haunted by such a gang as frequents it; its [Elysian Fields] are sacred to Venus and I saw scarce anyone there but snobs and their strumpets. Walked on in momentary expectation of stumbling on some couple engaged in ... "the commission of gross vulgarity."

The Elysian Fields were also notorious as a preferred suicide spot, with the semi-famous (composer S.H. Dyer and Colonnade proprietor Michael McCarty) and the unknown among the victims. According to the Jersey Journal in 1884, "The bodies of suicides found dangling from the trees and those washed ashore during the past three decades would give the [Elysian] Fields a startling record as a morgue, as during that period more than 300 corpses were found in that locality."

== Decline ==
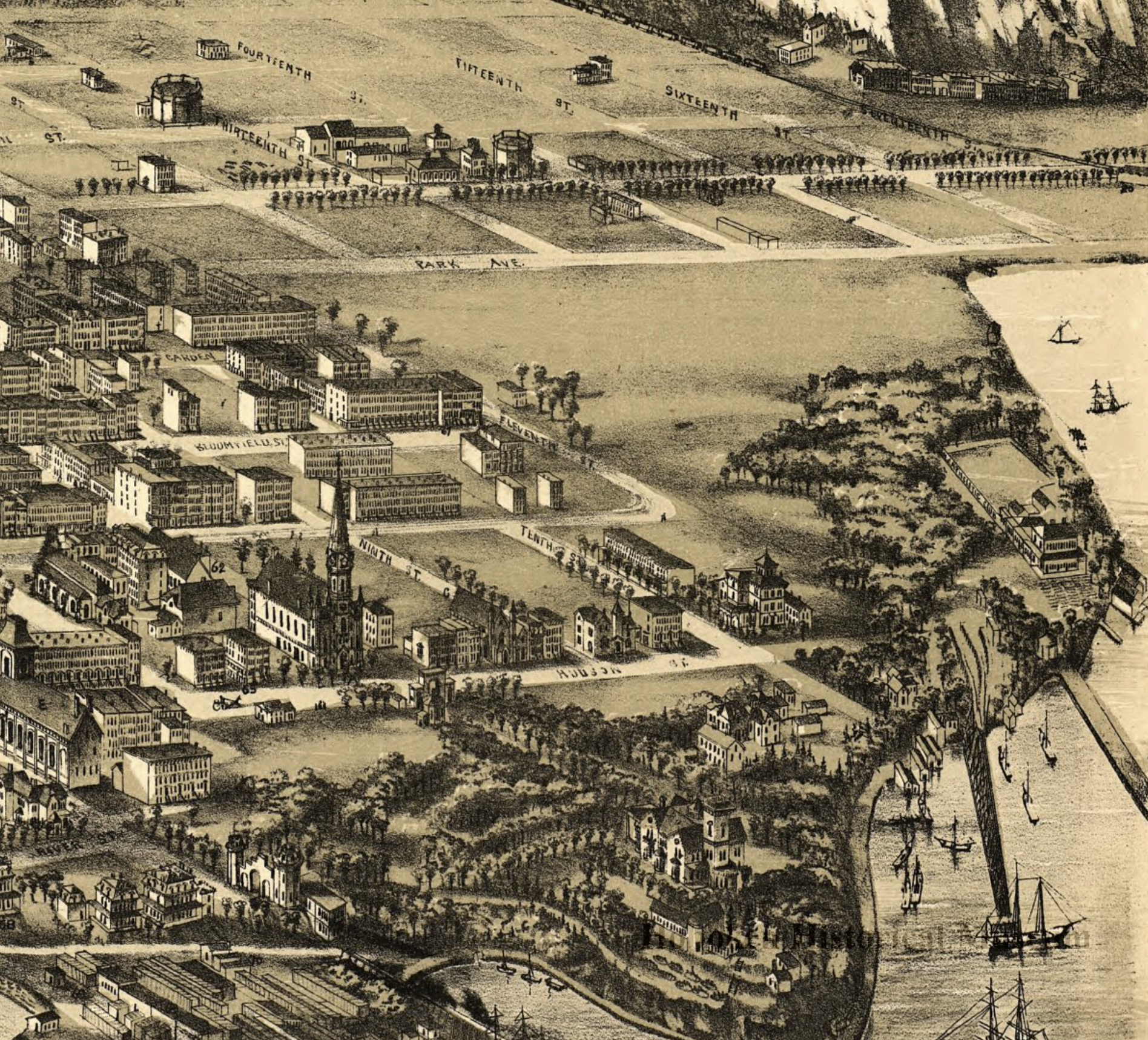
1881 map of northeast Hoboken depicting what remained of the Elysian Fields

By the early 1870s, as Hoboken's waterfront become more industrial and the neighborhood more run-down, the allure of the Elysian Fields, the Colonnade, and Sybil's Cave as tourist attractions began to fade. By this time, all of the founding fathers of the grounds—the Stevens patriarchs—had died, the last, Edwin Augustus Stevens, in 1868. The original Stevens family plan to build the grounds to attract buyers of Hoboken real estate had been successful, and the Elysian Fields no longer served that purpose.

With the construction of two significant baseball parks enclosed by fences in Brooklyn in the early 1860s (the Capitoline Grounds and Union Grounds), enabling promoters to charge admission to games, the prominence of the Elysian Fields as a baseball and cricket venue began to wane. The St. George Cricket Club, which had relocated from the Elysian Fields to Hoboken's nearby Fox Hill, left the latter grounds in 1865 to secure playing space in New York. In 1868, the leading Manhattan baseball club, the New York Mutuals, shifted its home games from the Elysian Fields to the Union Grounds.

The completion of Central Park in the 1860s gave New York residents a Manhattan-based alternative to crossing the Hudson for relaxation and amusement in a landscaped meadow. (Ironically, the city of New York prohibited baseball in Central Park.) Until the Polo Grounds in Upper Manhattan were leased to the New York Metropolitans in 1880, New York-area teams after the Civil War were largely based in Brooklyn. The New York Clipper wrote in 1869: "This is probably the last season of the once famous Elysian Fields as a place of resort for our metropolitan ball clubs." The once-preeminent New York clubs who had begun playing at the grounds in the 1840s and 1850s—the Gothams, the Knickerbockers, the Empire, and the Eagles—continued playing in Hoboken until the 1870s. However, by then the sport had evolved to paid professionalism (the first major league, the National Association, debuted in 1871), and these old clubs were competitively irrelevant.

In 1879, the New Jersey Athletic Club opened new multi-use grounds at what remained of the northeastern part of the Elysian Fields. The grounds showcased bicycle and foot-races, pole-leaping, hammer throwing, shot-put, and other competitive athletic pursuits. (By enlarging the image, the name of the NJ Athletic Club can be seen printed along the perimeter wall in the accompanying 1881 map.)

Sybil's Cave was closed in 1880 due to health department concerns about water quality, and it was used as a cool storage locker for a nearby eating establishment. That establishment devolved into a seedy waterfront tavern and closed in the 1930s, when the cave was filled in with concrete and dirt.

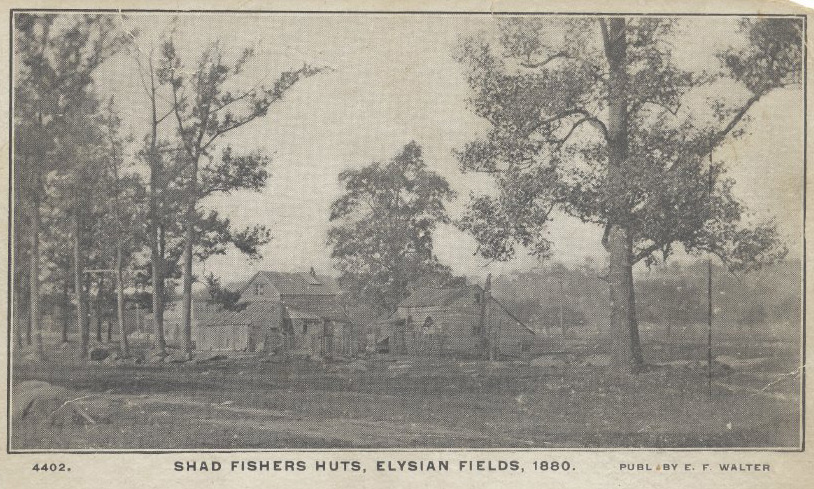
Shad fishers' huts located at the Elysian Fields, 1880

Tom Gilbert wrote that by the mid-1890s, "The baseball fields gave way to piers, warehouses, and more railroad tracks." The New York Herald-Tribune, in 1890, described the area's rapid urban transformation:

In the upper part of the city, row after row of fine flat houses and dwellings have sprung up where boys formerly played baseball. The splendid old oaks of the famous Elysian Fields, the scene of the murder of Mary Rogers, the tragedy which gave birth to Poe's "Mystery of Marie Roget," have one by one fallen before the axe, and in their places are the rows of new brick dwellings. The River Walk, a stretch of two miles under the cliffs of Castle Point, has been extended, and soon expensive wharves for the accommodation of European steamers will be built along the base of the Point. A new public school, costing $75,000, has just been finished, and a new police station on the Elysian Fields is contemplated.

A November 1893 article in the New York Herald was even more apocalyptic: its headline was "Last of Famous Elysian Fields," followed by a succession of three sub-heads, which read, "The Long Favored Amusement Haunts of New Yorkers Soon to Disappear / Time's Destroying Touches / Historical Retreats and Honored Landmarks of Early Days Now Being Rapidly Obliterated." The article stated:

Even up to the past year was the hand of progress and time stayed and inroads toward the utter obliteration of the former spot so dear and memorable to New Yorkers sparsely advanced, so that it appeared as if it was really with reluctance that the despoilers of the grounds almost held sacred cared to go on at any rampant pace, as though fully mindful of the fact that when the news was spread of the final destruction of the old Elysian Fields, the work would be by many felt as an utter desecration. But during the past four months the march of improvement in Hoboken as a modern suburb and town of stimulated enterprise has been steadily asserting itself, and piece by piece the approaches to the Elysian Fields have been encroached upon, until the very centre of the greatly admired domain, filled with its treasured romantic and historical surroundings, is now in readiness for speedy and complete obliteration. First the lower approaches to the famous pleasure grounds were cut into by the establishing of a number of steamship wharves for foreign traffic, just below the grounds of the Stevens Institute ... To those with whom a lingering regard still exists for Elysian Fields and who have not of late frequented the old grounds, the transformation now being wrought and already accomplished will be indeed surprising. In fact, certain quarters of the favorite, ancient domain to old Gothamites who were wont to make the Elysian Fields the one retreat for their Sunday's recreation will scarcely be recognized.

W. Jay Mills, in his 1902 book Historic Houses of New Jersey, wrote:

The Stevens home to-day does not miss the wide strip of pebbly beach, now profaned by huge piers and warehouses, the immortal river walk, which has disappeared, where old New York came to promenade and recruit its wasted energy, and the forgotten green where the weary rested and sipped their sangaree punch and strong waters. These all belong to another period, but it can ever look proudly on the great institute which the wealth given by Hoboken helped the family to establish, almost on the spot where Colonel John Stevens, the planner of the forgotten "Hoboken, the Beautiful," had his workshop and conducted his mechanical experiments.

== The area today ==
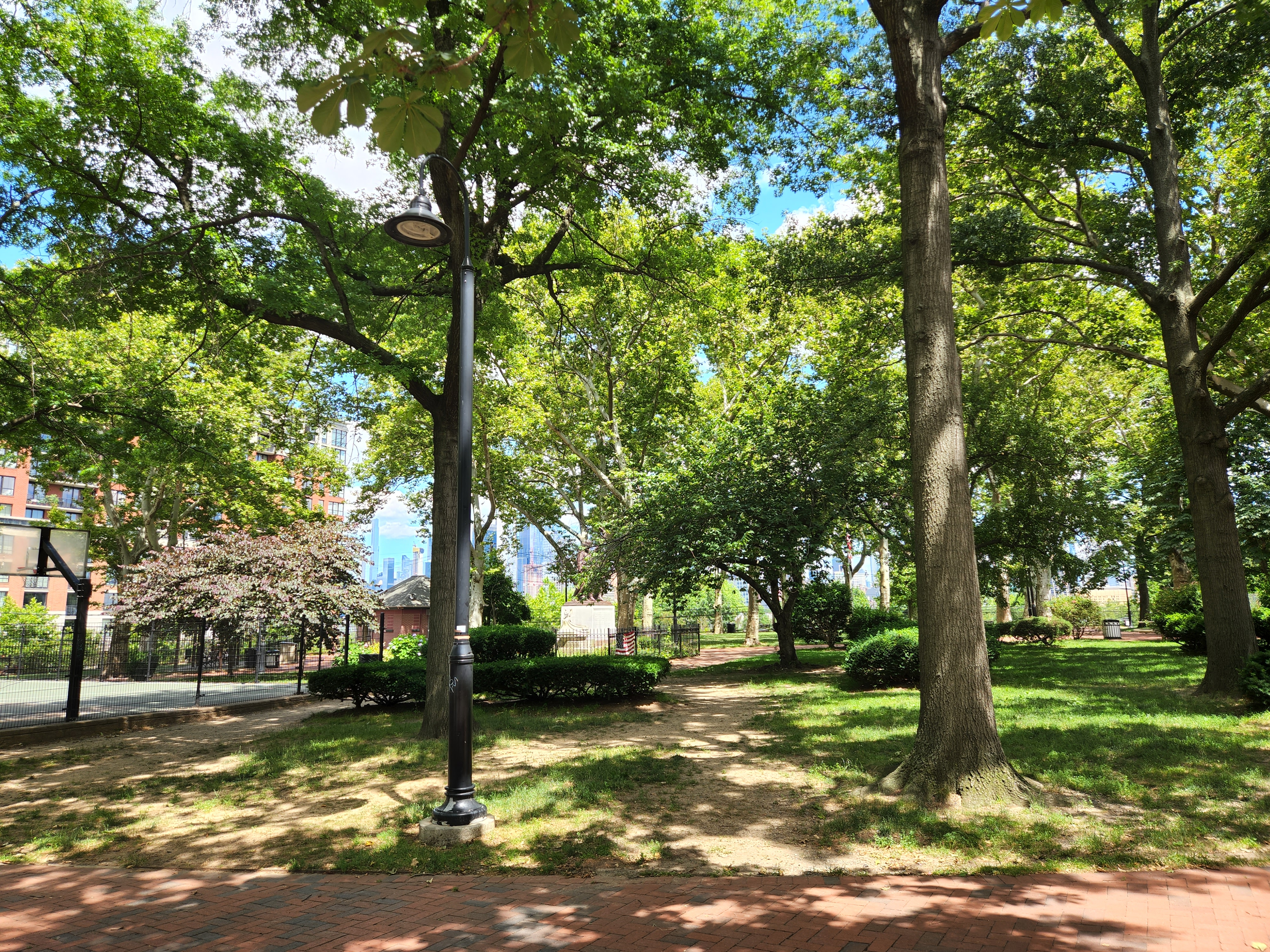
Elysian Park, Hoboken, June 2022, facing east, with New York City in the distance

The Elysian Fields has long since been supplanted by a modern street grid. A Maxwell House Coffee plant was built on a section of the former Elysian grounds in 1939. During its heyday it was the largest employer in town, and its towering "Good to the Last Drop" sign, featuring a giant tilted coffee cup, dominated Hoboken's skyline along the Hudson River. A neighborhood tavern named Maxwell's, whose habitués were the plant's shift workers, was located around the corner at 1039 Washington Street. In the 1970s, Maxwell's became a notable bar/restaurant and indie-rock club. The Maxwell House plant closed in 1990 and was later demolished, to be replaced by a high-rise condominium.

The only recreational remnant of the Elysian Fields is a small playground named Elysian Park. It is bounded on the west by Hudson Street, on the north and east by Frank Sinatra Drive (which winds around the park's northern perimeter), and stretches from 10th to 11th Streets. One scene from the 1954 Elia Kazan film On the Waterfront, starring Marlon Brando and Eva Marie Saint, was filmed in Elysian Park along its iron fence overlooking the Hudson. There is no baseball field on the grounds.

The Stevens name lives on at the Stevens Institute of Technology, located south of where the Elysian Fields were situated. The institute was established in 1868 through a bequest from Edwin Augustus Stevens. As of 2021, there were over 8,000 students enrolled.

At the intersection of 11th and Washington Streets, a few blocks west of Elysian Park, a marker was placed where one of the two Elysian Fields baseball diamonds is thought to have been situated; however, the spot is historically speculative, as the neighborhood and streets have changed drastically since the mid-19th century and the waterfront has been extended by landfill. In 2003 a civic improvement organization called the Hoboken Industry and Business Association placed concrete and bronze "base" monuments in the sidewalk at the intersection's corners. A bronze plaque denoting the connection to early baseball was placed in the median strip of 11th Street between first and second bases.
