= Knickerbocker Base Ball Club of New York =

Early baseball team in New York City, United States (1845-70s)

New York Knickerbockers
- Knickerbocker Base Ball Club

Information
- Location: New York City
- Ballpark: Elysian Fields
- Founded: September 23, 1845 by Alexander Cartwright
- Folded: early 1870s
- Colors

Current uniforms
Home

The New York Knickerbockers were one of the first organized baseball teams which played under a set of rules similar to the game today. Founded as the Knickerbocker Base Ball Club by Alexander Cartwright in 1845, the team remained active until the early 1870s.

In 1851, the New York Knickerbockers wore the first ever recorded baseball uniforms.

== Origins and rules ==
While a member of the volunteer Knickerbocker Engine Company No. 12, Alexander Joy Cartwright became involved in playing town ball (an older game similar to baseball) with the Gotham Club of New York at Murray Hill in Manhattan. In 1845, several members of the Gothams felt the club had grown too large for their "fastidious" tastes, and broke away to create an invitation-only ball club. They found a playing field, the Elysian Fields, a large tree-filled parkland across the Hudson River in Hoboken, New Jersey run by Colonel John Stevens, which charged $75 a year to rent. In order to pay the rental fees, Cartwright organized a ball club so that he could collect the needed money. The club was named the "Knickerbockers", in honor of the fire company of which Cartwright was a member. The Knickerbockers club was organized on September 23, 1845. The first officers were Duncan F. Curry, president, William R. Wheaton, vice-president, and William H. Tucker, secretary-treasurer.

Creating a club for the ball players called for a formal set of rules for each member to adhere to, foremost among them to "have the reputation of a gentleman". Wheaton and Tucker formalized the Knickerbocker Rules, a set of twenty rules for the team:

1. Members must strictly observe the time agreed upon for exercise, and be punctual in their attendance.
2. When assembled for exercise, the President, or in his absence, the Vice-President, shall appoint an umpire, who shall keep the game in a book provided for that purpose, and note all violations of the By-Laws and Rules during the time of exercise.
3. The presiding officer shall designate two members as Captains, who shall retire and make the match to be played, observing at the same time that the players opposite to each other should be as nearly equal as possible, the choice of sides to be then tossed for, and the first in hand to be decided in like manner.
4. The bases shall be from "home" to second base, forty-two paces; from first to third base, forty-two paces, equidistant.
5. No stump match shall be played on a regular day of exercise.
6. If there should not be a sufficient number of members of the Club present at the time agreed upon to commence exercise, gentlemen not members may be chosen in to make up the match, which shall not be broken up to take in members that may afterwards appear; but in all cases, members shall have the preference, when present, at the making of a match.
7. If members appear after the game is commenced, they may be chosen in if mutually agreed upon.
8. The game to consist of twenty-one counts, or aces; but at the conclusion an equal number of hands must be played.
9. The ball must be pitched, not thrown, for the bat.
10. A ball knocked out of the field, or outside the range of first or third base, is foul.
11. Three balls being struck at and missed and the last one caught, is a hand out; if not caught is considered fair, and the striker bound to run.
12. If a ball be struck, or tipped, and caught, either flying or on the first bound, it is a hand out.
13. A player running the bases shall be out, if the ball is in the hands of an adversary on the base, or the runner is touched with it before he makes his base; it being understood, however, that in no instance is a ball to be thrown at him.
14. A player running who shall prevent an adversary from catching or getting the ball before making his base, is a hand out.
15. Three hands out, all out.
16. Players must take their strike in regular turn.
17. All disputes and differences relative to the game, to be decided by the Umpire, from which there is no appeal.
18. No ace or base can be made on a foul strike.
19. A runner cannot be put out in making one base, when a balk is made by the pitcher.
20. But one base allowed when a ball bounds out of the field when struck.

It is likely that Wheaton picked some of his twenty rules based upon his previous experience in town ball play in Manhattan. According to his own account some fifty years later, his written rules for the Gotham Base Ball Club in 1837 eliminated "plugging" the runner and laid out the infield as a regular diamond. The twenty rules differed in several respects from other early versions of baseball and from rounders, the English game commonly considered the closest relative of baseball. "Two of these rules—the one that abolished soaking [putting a runner out by hitting him with a thrown ball] and the one that designated a foul as a do-over—were revolutionary, while the others gave the game a new degree of uniformity."

== First "officially recorded" game and subsequent history ==
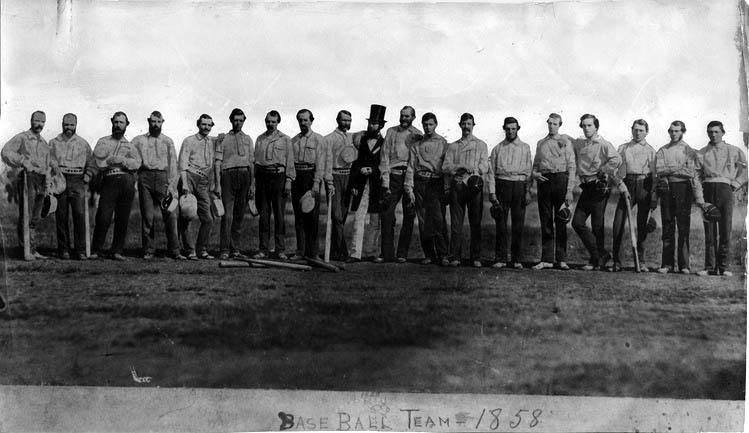
The Knickerbockers (left) posing with their rivals in 1858

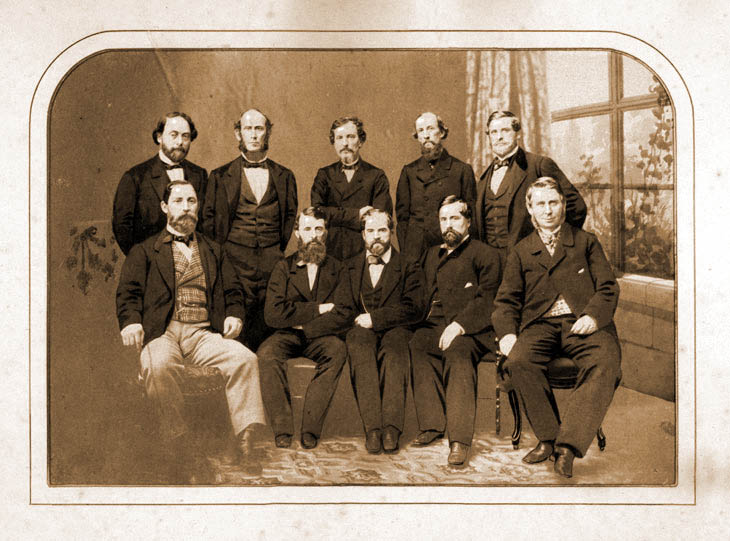
Salt print of the 1848–1850 New York Knickerbockers, taken December 1862

The formation of the Knickerbockers club across the Hudson River created a division in the group of Manhattan players. According to Wheaton, "The new game quickly became very popular with New Yorkers, and the numbers of the club soon swelled beyond the fastidious notions of some of us, and we decided to withdraw and found a new organization, which we called the Knickerbocker." Membership in the Knickerbockers was by invitation and required the payment of dues; those Gothams or "New Yorks" who were excluded continued to play among themselves.

What was long considered the first "officially recorded" baseball game was played on June 19, 1846 at the Elysian Fields in Hoboken, New Jersey. The "Knickerbockers" and the "New York Nine" (also known as the New York Baseball Club, probably identical with the Gothams), played with Cartwright's twenty rules. Cartwright's team, the Knickerbockers, lost 23 to 1 to the New Yorks in four innings. Some say that Cartwright's team lost because his best players did not want to make the trip across the river. Cartwright was the umpire during this game and fined one player six cents for cursing.

The lineups for the teams were:

Knickerbockers	NY Nine
Turney	Davis
Adams	Winslow
Tucker	Ransom
Birney	Murphy
Avery	Case
H. Anthony	Johnson
D. Anthony	Thompson
Tryon	Trenchard
Paulding	Sandy Rantos

However, there were several other recorded games prior to this. On October 6, 1845, the Knickerbocker Club played a 3-inning game between its own members, and on October 22, 1845, the "New York Club" beat the "Brooklyn Club" 24 to 4, with the box score included in the next day's morning newspaper.

Charles Schuyler De Bost, a catcher with the club for over 10 years, would be named club director in the mid 1850s. Over the next few years, the rules of baseball spread throughout the country. Baseball was becoming a popular sport with Americans and drew spectators by the thousands. The Knickerbocker rules would soon become part of the rules of the National Association of Base Ball Players in 1857. These rules slowly evolved into today's rules of baseball.

When the National Association of Base Ball Players was founded in 1858, the Knickerbockers began to lose their influence, and the club died out entirely in the early 1870s, after baseball had become thoroughly professionalized.

One century later, the Knickerbockers name itself was adopted by the New York Knickerbockers National Basketball Association team, although it is more commonly known by its shortened form, the Knicks.

== See also ==
- Origins of baseball

== Bibliography ==
- Orem, Preston D. (1961), Baseball (1845–1881) From the Newspaper Accounts, Altadena, CA: Self-published ASIN B0007HTB88
- Peterson, Harold (1969, 1973), The Man Who Invented Baseball, New York: Charles Scribner's Sons ISBN 978-0-684-13185-6
