= The Neyer/James Guide to Pitchers =

2004 book by Rob Neyer and Bill James

First edition

The Neyer/James Guide to Pitchers (ISBN 0-7432-6158-5) is a non-fiction baseball reference book, written by Rob Neyer and Bill James and published by Simon & Schuster in June 2004. In the text on its dust jacket, it bills itself as a "comprehensive guide" to "pitchers, the pitches they throw, and how they throw them".

== Contents ==
The Neyer/James Guide to Pitchers is divided into three main sections.

The first section contains a series of 11 chapters dealing with eight different pitches, such as the fastball, spitball, curveball, change, slider, knuckleball, forkball, and screwball. These chapters detail such matters as the origin of these pitches, the history of their nomenclature, a description of any sub-types, and citations of different pitchers who were noted for their skill in throwing particular pitches. All but two of these chapters are credited to Neyer.

The second section is concerned with pitchers. It includes brief essays on a series of individual players: Tommy Bond, Tony Mullane, Wilbur Cooper, Eddie Rommel, Mel Harder, Lon Warneke, Tommy Bridges, Bucky Walters, Billy Pierce, and Bob Friend. These essays are followed by a "Pitcher Census", which occupies approximately two-thirds of the book's length. This census is a list and brief description of most of the noteworthy pitchers in both Major League Baseball and the Negro leagues. Each pitcher's entry includes a header stating both the pitcher's physical data (height, weight, and handedness) and a listing of a few of his career statistics (won-lost record, earned run average, and saves). Below this header, Neyer and James have compiled a list of pitches known to have been thrown by that pitcher, along with one or more citations from scouting guides or media sources of the period. Some pitchers' entries also include quotes from contemporary observers and/or descriptions of the pitcher's throwing motion or career. The second section concludes with two lists: one containing all pitchers known to have thrown a knuckleball, and another for all pitchers who used a sidearm or underhand delivery.

Amusingly, the book also contains entries for such fictional pitchers as Sidd Finch, Damon Rutherford (from the novel The Universal Baseball Association, Inc., J. Henry Waugh, Prop.) and even Charlie Brown of Peanuts fame (who, the book dryly notes, "gave up an unusual number of line drives up the middle").

The third section contains five sabermetric essays on pitching written by James. One of these essays deals with the "Pitcher Abuse Points" statistic developed by Baseball Prospectus, and this essay is followed by a response by Prospectus writers Rany Jazayerli and Keith Woolner.

== Awards and honors ==
- 2004: "The Sporting News-SABR Baseball Research Award", presented by the Society for American Baseball Research.
