= Joe Sheehan (journalist) =

Joseph S. Sheehan was born in New York City on February 26, 1971, and attended Regis High School. He graduated from the University of Southern California in 1994 with a degree in journalism. Sheehan lives in the New York City area. He is one of the founders and was a co-editor of the first annual book of sabermetric baseball forecasts and analyses by Baseball Prospectus in 1996 as well as several later volumes.

On October 10, 2007, Sheehan took on an additional role as Managing Editor of the newly founded Basketball Prospectus.

As of December 31, 2009, Sheehan no longer worked for Baseball Prospectus. However, he continued to make occasional contributions to BP's "Unfiltered" blog.

At the beginning of the 2010 baseball season, he began publishing a weekly "Inside Baseball" column in Sports Illustrated.

He also contributes to RotoWire and appears weekly on the RotoWire Fantasy Sports Today show on Sirius XM radio.

== Career ==
In an on-line interview, he recalled how he became involved with Baseball Prospectus:

I’ve been involved with Baseball Prospectus since before it had a name. Gary Huckabay and Clay Davenport had a plan to publish Clay's Translations and Gary's projections along with player comments in a book. They had been doing so on USENET, in the rec.sport.baseball newsgroup, for years.

Rany Jazayerli offered them his Organizational Pitching Reports for use in the as-yet-unnamed book. When Rany—who was a friend of mine though a Strat league—told me this, I offered my services as an editor on the project. Gary, who only really knew me through the newsgroup, invited me on board. I might even forgive him one day.

This all happened in the fourth quarter of 1995. We published BP 1996 just in time for Opening Day.

Sheehan wrote the "Prospectus Today" column for BaseballProspectus.com, and is a frequent contributor to ESPN.com and commentator on ESPN radio, Fantasy Focus on XM Radio and other baseball news programs and an occasional contributor to other publications, including Sports Illustrated.com and the New York Times.

In his first column writing as Managing Editor of the on-line Basketball Prospectus on October 10, 2007, Sheehan professed his lifelong love for basketball and outlined the plans for this new entry in the lineup of products by Prospectus Entertainment Ventures, LLC.

On December 31, 2009, Sheehan became a free agent: his contract was not renewed with Baseball Prospectus. As he said, "No hard feelings or recriminations, just two entities doing business."

By April, he had landed a position as a regular on-line columnist with Sports Illustrated. He also publishes a blog, "Joe Sheehan," and a subscription newsletter, "The Joe Sheehan Newsletter".
