= Joel Piñeiro =

Puerto Rican baseball player (born 1978)

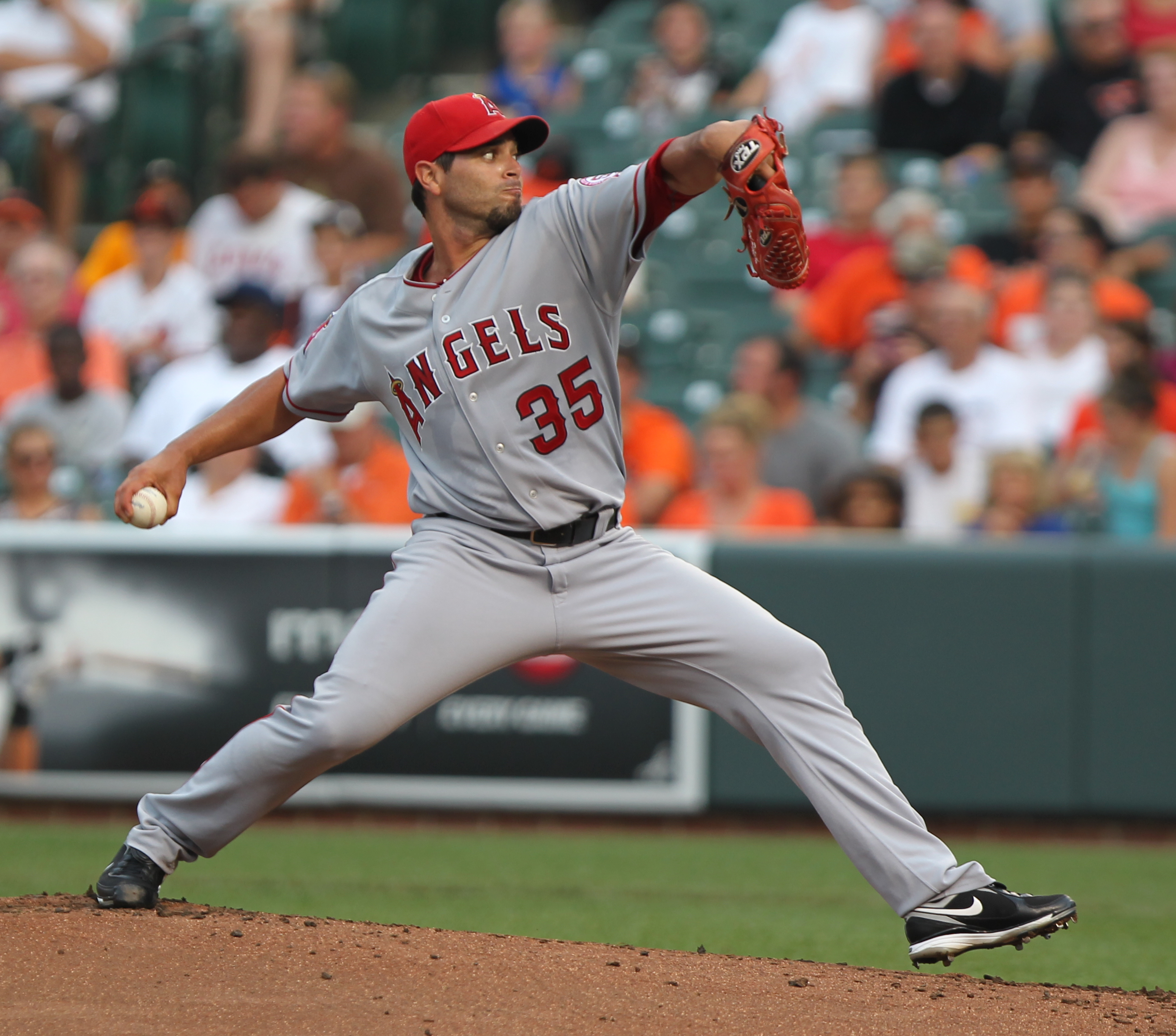
- Piñeiro pitching for the Angels in 2011.
- Pitcher
- Born: September 25, 1978 (age 47); Río Piedras, Puerto Rico
- Batted: Right Threw: Right

MLB debut
- August 8, 2000, for the Seattle Mariners

Last MLB appearance
- September 25, 2011, for the Los Angeles Angels of Anaheim

MLB statistics
- Win–loss record: 104–93
- Earned run average: 4.41
- Strikeouts: 1,058
- Stats at Baseball Reference

Teams
- Seattle Mariners (2000–2006); Boston Red Sox (2007); St. Louis Cardinals (2007–2009); Los Angeles Angels of Anaheim (2010–2011)
Medals
Men's baseball
Representing Puerto Rico
World Baseball Classic
Silver medal – second place	2017 Los Angeles	Team

Joel Alberto Piñeiro (Spanish pronunciation: [xoˈel piˈɲejɾo], /dʒoʊˈɛl pɪnˈjɛəroʊ/; born September 25, 1978) is a Puerto Rican former professional baseball pitcher. He played in Major League Baseball (MLB) for the Seattle Mariners, Boston Red Sox, St. Louis Cardinals, and Los Angeles Angels of Anaheim. He officially retired after appearing on the 2017 World Baseball Classic roster for Puerto Rico.

== Professional career ==
=== Seattle Mariners ===
Piñeiro began the 2004 baseball season as a promising starting pitcher for the Seattle Mariners. The previous two years he started in 60 games, won a total of 30 games, and produced a 3.52 ERA. 2004 though, turned into a dismal year with Piñeiro posting a 4.67 ERA and the first losing record of his career (6 wins – 11 losses). Piñeiro suffered another problem when he was placed on the disabled list July 27, 2004, with a sore elbow and missed the remainder of the season.

Piñeiro continued his struggles in 2005 and was optioned to Triple-A Tacoma on May 14. He returned to the majors and started in 30 total games; however he was unable to return to his previous form and posted a 5.62 ERA for the year.

In 2006, Piñeiro was pulled from the starting rotation again on August 26, and placed in the bullpen. His 6.36 ERA was the highest in the major leagues.

Following the 2006 season, the Mariners declined to tender Piñeiro a contract offer, making him a free agent.

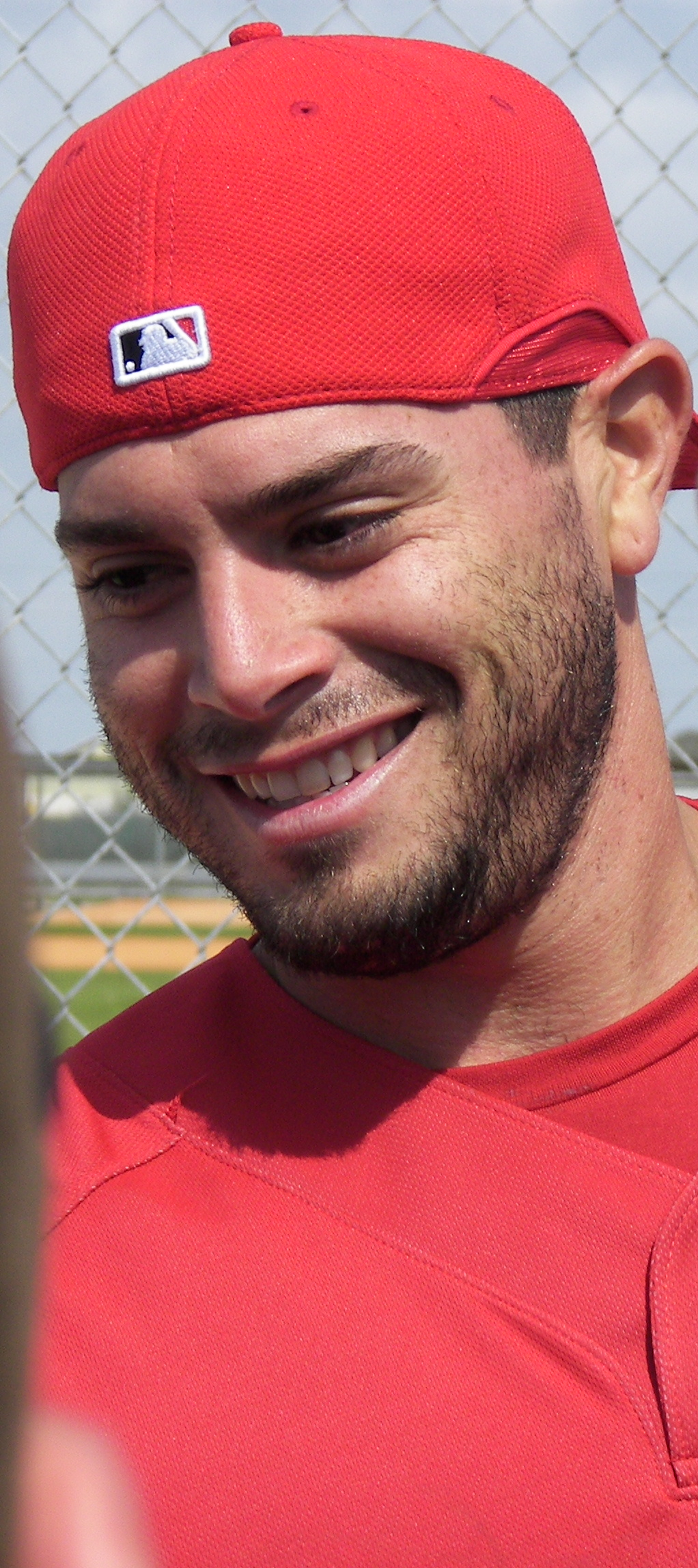
Piñeiro with the Red Sox in 2007.

=== Boston Red Sox ===
On January 3, 2007, he reached an agreement for a one-year deal with the Boston Red Sox, where he struggled as a member of the bullpen. On July 22, he was designated for assignment to clear a roster spot for Jon Lester. Piñeiro cleared waivers and accepted an assignment with the Triple-A Pawtucket Red Sox.

=== St. Louis Cardinals ===
On July 31, 2007, Piñeiro was traded to the St. Louis Cardinals, with cash considerations, for a player to be named later (minor league outfielder Sean Danielson).

In his debut start with the Cardinals on August 4 vs. the Washington Nationals, he pitched 5 innings, giving up 7 hits, 5 runs (4 earned), 2 walks, 2 strikeouts, 1 home run while taking his second loss of the year in the Cardinals 12–1 loss.

In his home debut with the Cardinals on August 9 against the San Diego Padres, he out-pitched Chris Young, giving up only 4 hits, 0 runs, 0 walks, and earning 4 strikeouts, lowering his ERA to 4.50 for the year in winning his second game with the Cardinals in their 5–0 win. For the rest of 2007, Piñeiro showed some flashes of promise but general inconsistency, finishing with a record of 6–4 and posting an earned run average of 3.96 for his new team.

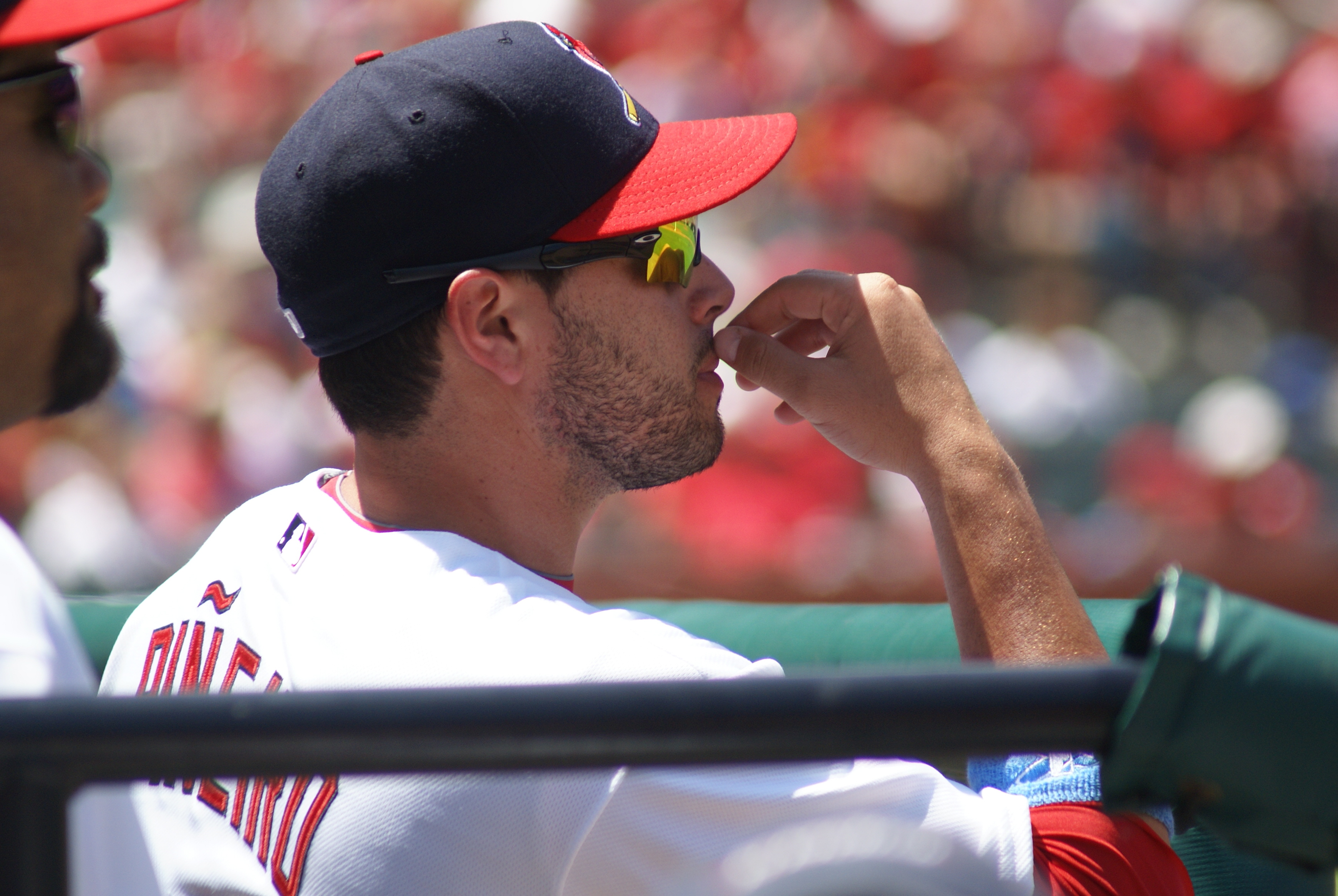
Piñeiro in 2008

2008 was a season typified by inconsistency and a trip to the DL, as Piñeiro allowed home runs and 180 hits in 148 2/3 IP, posting a 7–7 record and 5.15 ERA. However, leading into 2009, Piñeiro reinvented his approach, utilizing a sinking fastball to pitch to contact and concede more ground balls, while limiting the number of home runs allowed. In 32 starts, Piñeiro posted a 15–12 record with a 3.49 ERA and led the major leagues with 1.1 walks per nine innings pitched.

After the 2009 season, Piñeiro filed for free agency.

=== Los Angeles Angels of Anaheim ===
On January 22, 2010, Piñeiro signed a 2-year, $16 million deal with the Los Angeles Angels of Anaheim.

Because of Piñeiro's volatile performance before the 2009 season, critics were split on the deal, with most wondering whether his sinkerball would continue to be effective in 2010. Taking the sinkerball as starting point, FanGraphs' Dave Allen thought, "the price was solid." Baseball Prospectus's Christina Kahrl pointed out the different starters that failed after leaving Cardinals pitching coach Dave Duncan's guiding hand. "There are so many unknowns that it makes the proposition that he'll deliver on this deal seem dubious", concluding "this just doesn't seem like it'll go well." Meanwhile, ESPN's Rob Neyer said quality was not so important as quantity: Piñeiro would be worth the contract if he would just pitch 200 innings per season. His first season was cut short due to injury, starting only 23 games. The following season was met with another trip to the disabled list. He finished 7–7 in 27 games (24 starts). He became a free agent following the 2011 season.

=== Philadelphia Phillies ===
On January 15, 2012, Piñeiro signed a minor league deal that included an invitation to Spring Training with the Philadelphia Phillies. Piñeiro was released on March 19, after just six innings in spring training.

=== Baltimore Orioles ===
On April 11, 2012, Piñeiro signed a minor league contract with the Baltimore Orioles. He made 5 starts split between the rookie-level Gulf Coast League Orioles, and Triple-A Norfolk Tides before missing the remainder of the season with a shoulder injury. Piñeiro elected free agency following the season on November 2.

Piñeiro re-signed with the Orioles on a new minor league contract on February 1, 2013. He was released by the Orioles organization on July 30.

=== Chicago Cubs ===
On March 30, 2014, Piñeiro signed a minor league contract with the Chicago Cubs. On June 6, the Cubs released Piñeiro.

=== Los Angeles Angels (second stint) ===
On June 7, 2014, Piñeiro signed a minor league contract to return to the Los Angeles Angels, a day after being released by the Cubs. He was released on June 30, after being suspended 50 games for testing positive for a banned stimulant.

=== Toronto Blue Jays ===
On May 9, 2015, Piñeiro signed a minor league contract with the Toronto Blue Jays. He was assigned to the Double-A New Hampshire Fisher Cats, and later the Triple-A Buffalo Bisons. In 13 appearances (11 starts), Piñeiro posted a 5–4 record, 4.23 ERA, and 35 strikeouts in 76 2/3 innings pitched. He was released on July 22.

== International career ==
Piñeiro pitched for Puerto Rico in the 2006 World Baseball Classic, starting twice and allowing two earned runs in 8 2/3 innings. He was on Puerto Rico's roster for the 2017 World Baseball Classic but did not pitch in the tournament. He retired after the tournament.

== Personal life ==
Piñeiro and his wife and four children. Their son, also named Joel, has pitched in college baseball.

== See also ==
- List of Major League Baseball players from Puerto Rico
