= Value over replacement player =

Baseball statistic

In baseball, value over replacement player (or VORP) is a statistic popularized by Keith Woolner which demonstrates how much a hitter, pitcher or outfielder contributes to their team in comparison to a replacement-level player who is an average fielder at that position and a below average hitter. A replacement player performs at "replacement level", which is the level of performance an average team can expect when trying to replace a player at minimal cost, also known as "freely available talent".

== Usage ==
VORP's usefulness is in the fact that it measures the marginal utility of individual players. Other statistics compare individual players to the league average, which is good for cross-era analysis. For example, 90 runs created in 1915 are much better than 90 runs created in 2015, because runs were more scarce in 1915. However, league average comparisons such as Runs Created are not as informative when considering a player's total contribution to a team.

VORP is a cumulative or counting statistic, not a projected statistic. For example, if Player A has a VORP of +25 runs after 81 games, they have contributed 25 more runs of offense to the team than the theoretical replacement player would have, over 81 games. As Player A continues to play the rest of the season, their VORP will increase or decrease, depending upon performance, and settle at a final figure at the end of the season.

== For hitters ==
There is a finite number of outs that a team can make in one game, and it is almost always 27 (or 3 outs/inning × 9 innings/game). A player consumes these outs to create runs, and at the simplest level, runs and outs are the only meaningful stats in baseball. Outs are calculated by taking at-bats and subtracting hits, then adding various outs that do not count toward at-bats: sacrifice hits, sacrifice flies, caught stealing, and grounded into double-play (the batter is charged an at-bat, but the non-batter runner is not). Runs may be estimated by one of many run-approximation methods: Bill James' runs created, Pete Palmer's linear weights, BaseRuns, etc. Baseball Prospectus author Keith Woolner uses Clay Davenport's Equivalent Runs in the calculation of VORP. Armed with runs and outs (for the player and that player's league), one can finally calculate VORP.

Critics of VORP take issue with where the formula's arbitrary "replacement level" is set. Numerous equations and methods exist for finding the replacement level, but most will set the level somewhere around 80% of the league average, in terms of runs per out. There are two exceptions to this, though: catchers, who possess a larger defensive responsibility than any other player in the lineup (and are therefore more scarce), have a replacement level at 75% of the league average. At the other end of the defensive spectrum, first basemen and designated hitters must produce at a level above 85% of the average to be considered better than "replacement level", since defense is not a big consideration at either position (it is not a consideration at all for the DH).

Therefore, to calculate VORP, one must multiply the league's average runs per out by the player's total outs. This provides the number of runs an average player would have produced given that certain number of outs to work with. The number (of runs) is then multiplied by .8, or whatever percentage of average the replacement level is designated to be. The result is the number of runs one could expect a "replacement player" to put up with that number of outs. Subtract the replacement's runs created from the player's actual runs created, and the result is VORP.

This is not the final adjustment, however: while the replacement's run total will be park-neutral (by definition, because replacement numbers are derived from league averages), the player's raw numbers won't be. Before calculating the VORP, the individual player stats must be normalized via park factors to eliminate the distortions that can be created by each ballpark. This is especially true with extreme parks like Coors Field in Denver (where the thin high-altitude air allows baseballs to travel further than at sea level, although the humidor has significantly decreased the runs scored in Coors Field, to the extent that Denver is no longer considered a pure hitter's haven) and Petco Park in San Diego (where the heavier sea air couples with distant fences to suppress run-scoring). After the final adjustment, the resultant VORP may be used to estimate how "valuable" the player in question is by providing a good picture of that player's marginal utility.

== For pitchers ==
VORP can also be calculated for pitchers, as a measurement of the number of runs he has prevented from scoring that a replacement-level pitcher would have allowed. The concept is essentially the same as it was for hitters: using the player's playing time (in a pitcher's case, his innings pitched), determine how many runs a theoretical "replacement" would have given up in their playing time (at the most basic level, the replacement level is equal to 1 plus the league's average runs per game), and subtract from that number the amount actually allowed by the pitcher to arrive at VORP. As an aside, Run Average (RA9) is used as a measure of pitcher quality rather than Earned Run Average (ERA). ERA is heavily dependent on the concept of the error, which most sabermetricians have tried to shy away from because it is a scorer's opinion.

The "old" definition of pitching VORP, as alluded to above, was simply:

$$VORP = IP \cdot {{({{League R \over League G}} + 1) - RA9 \over 9}}$$

where

- R = Runs
- IP = Innings pitched
- G = Games played
- RA9 = Run average, sometimes written as RA

RA9 is calculated for the pitcher in question as

$$RA9 = 9 \cdot {{R \over IP}}$$

Baseball Prospectus 2002 revised the formula to reflect different replacement thresholds for starting pitchers and relief pitchers, as it is easier to put up a low RA9 in relief than as a starter.

For starting pitchers, $Repl. Level = (1.37 \cdot League RA9) - 0.66$
For relief pitcher, $Repl. Level = (1.70 \cdot League RA9) - 2.27$

Therefore, the current formula for VORP is:

$$VORP = IP \cdot {{Repl. Level - RA9 \over 9}}$$

As was the case with hitters, run average should be normalized for park effects before VORP is calculated. Pitcher VORP is on the same scale as that of hitters.

== See also ==
- Wins above replacement: another statistic with similar intentions
