= RotoWire =

American fantasy sports company

- Website type: Fantasy Sports
- Owner: Roto Sports, Inc. (Gambling.com Group)
- Creators: Peter Schoenke, Herb Ilk, Jeff Erickson
- Website: Rotowire.com
- Commercial: Yes
- Registration: Mostly pay site
- Launched: 1997
- Current status: Active

RotoWire is a company based in Madison, Wisconsin, U.S. that specializes in fantasy sports news and fantasy-style games, including daily fantasy sports (DFS) and online sports betting. The platform provides fantasy news and information to ESPN.com, Yahoo! Sports, FoxSports.com, NFL.com, CBSSports.com, FanDuel, DraftKings and Sirius XM Radio. RotoWire is the successor to RotoNews.com, which pioneered the concept of real-time fantasy sports information when launched in 1997.

== Products ==
- RotoWire.com is the company's primary product, a fantasy sports news site that focuses on MLB, NFL, NBA, NHL, auto racing (mostly NASCAR), golf, college football, college basketball, esports, MMA, cricket, soccer, and a number of iGaming platforms spanning sports betting, DFS, prediction markets, and online casinos. The web site features player news, draft kits, in-season tools, feature stories and statistical data to help fantasy players in each sport.
- RotoWire offers in-draft software for baseball and football, golf, basketball and hockey. The software comes as part of a subscription to RotoWire.com and isn't sold separately.
- RotoWire.com offers fantasy games and commissioner software.
- RotoWire hosts RotoWire Fantasy Sports Today on XM 87/Sirius 210 each Monday-Friday from 8 to 10 pm ET, Saturday from 1 to 3 pm ET and Sunday from 9-10 am ET. The fantasy sports show is primarily hosted by Jeff Erickson and Nick Whalen, along with Clay Link, James Anderson, Todd Zola, Joe Bartel, Alan Seslowsky, Jim Coventry and Mario Puig. RotoWire also hosts RotoWire Fantasy Baseball on XM 89/Sirius 209 each Saturday from 7 to 8 pm ET. RotoWire previously hosted two fantasy sports radio shows on XM Radio from 2005 to 2008. Fantasy Focus was a one-hour show hosted by Jeff Erickson on the MLB Home Plate channel in connection with XM Radio's extensive MLB offerings. The "RotoWire Fantasy Sports Hour" was a one-hour show hosted by Chris Liss on XM Sports Nation channel 144 that covered all sports, but mostly focused on fantasy football.
- RotoWire had two annual print publications produced by the same staff that operated the website: The RotoWire Fantasy Football Guide and RotoWire Fantasy Baseball Guide. Both publications were published at the start of the preseason from 2000 to 2022.
- RotoWire.com offers sports betting and DFS reviews and guides that helps gamblers choose the top promos and claim promo codes.
- RotoWire.com has experts covering top prediction market software and promotions currently operating in the United States.
- RotoWire.com covers top online casinos operating across the United States and Canada with guides, top bonuses, best practices, responsible gambling tips and more.

== Staff ==
- Jeff Erickson is senior editor of RotoWire. He's the only two-time winner of Baseball Writer of the Year from the Fantasy Sports Writers Association (2007 and 2008) and winner of the 2007 AL Tout Wars fantasy baseball title. He co-hosts the RotoWire Fantasy Sports Today on XM 87/Sirius 210.
- Peter Schoenke was the company's president from its conception to April 2026, and also frequently writes for the site. He won the Best Fantasy Baseball Article on the Internet in 2006 from the Fantasy Sports Writers Association. In 2011, Mr. Schoenke was elected to the hall of fame for both the Fantasy Sports Trade Association and Fantasy Sports Writers Association for his contribution to the growth of the industry.
- Nick Whalen is the company's senior media analyist. He co-hosts RotoWire's flagship show on Sirius XM Fantasy alongside Jeff Erickson, as well as The RotoWire NBA Show on Sirius XM NBA with Alex Barutha and RotoWire's show on VSiN.

== Frequent contributors ==
- Joe Sheehan is a frequent guest writer and appears frequently on RotoWire Fantasy Sports Today on Sirius XM.

== Former contributors ==
- Chris Liss was managing editor of RotoWire from 1999-2021 and co-hosted the RotoWire Fantasy Sports Today on XM 87/Sirius 210. He also wrote "Beating the Book," where he has picked every NFL game against the spread since 1999 at an astonishing 54 percent success rate. He won the 2010 Best Fantasy Baseball Article in Print from the Fantasy Sports Writers Association, the 2008 Best Fantasy Football Article on the Net from the Fantasy Sports Writers Association and won the 2009 Mixed League Tout Wars fantasy baseball title.
- Derek VanRiper - TheAthletic podcast host was a SiriusXM host and editor.
- Jonathan Bales - FantasyLabs co-founder was a contributing writer.
- Keith Law - ESPN baseball writer
- Tony Blegino - Special assistant to the general manager, baseball operations, Seattle Mariners
- Stephania Bell - ESPN Injury Expert.
- John Sickels served as RotoWire's minor league expert from 2006 to 2010. He also hosted Fantasy Focus on Fridays, when it was called "Down on the Farm."
- Steve Moyer - President, Baseball Info Solutions
- Fred Katz - TheAthletic NBA reporter was an intern and contributor.
- Carson Cistulli was a contributing writer for NBA and to RotoWire's RotoSynthesis blog. He won the FSWA 2011 basketball sports writer of the year award for his work with RotoWire.
- Will Carroll has been a frequent contributing writer for RotoWire's baseball magazine.
- Dalton Del Don was a staff writer and now writes for Yahoo! Sports.
- Andy Benoit - The current SI writer contributed to NFL coverage.
- Eddie Huang - Contributed to NBA coverage.
- Jonah Keri - Wrote a blog for RotoWire in 2009-10. Frequent radio and podcast guest.
- Patrick Newman – Covered Japanese baseball.

== Company history ==
RotoNews.com launched in January 1997 and published its first player note on Feb. 16 1997. RotoNews revolutionized how fantasy sports information was presented on the web with the innovation of the "player note" which were snippets of information every time a player was hurt, traded, benched or had a news event that impacted his fantasy value - all search-able in a real-time database. Most sites today follow how RotoNews had a "news" and "analysis" element to each player update.

"Back in 1997, Peter and his crew launched RotoNews.com (now known as Rotowire.com), giving us fantasy owners a wondrous gift: the player news application. You know, here's an update on a guy, and here's the fantasy spin on that news. This changed everything. The days of feeling like a moron because you started a quarterback who, unbeknownst to you, had frayed his septum? Over. And you have Peter to thank."

Within two years RotoNews had become one of the top ten most trafficked sports sites on the web, according to Media Metrix, ranking higher than such sites as NBA.com. RotoNews.com also launched the Web's first free commissioner service in 1998, quickly becoming the largest league management service.

"The Internet has been a god-send for fantasy-leaguers. Updated information is just a mouse-click away, while instantaneous box scores make the morning paper seem like the Stone Age.

How did we ever play fantasy baseball before the Internet? The same question can be asked of an online service that is changing the face of the industry. In just two short years, RotoNews.com has become the industry leader for news and stats.

RotoNews.com was sold to Broadband Sports in 1999, which failed in 2001. The company re-emerged as RotoWire.com. RotoWire.com moved from a free model to a pay model in 2001.

RotoWire was acquired by Gambling.com Group in January 2022.
