= Major League Baseball draft =

Primary draft by Major League Baseball teams to assign amateur players

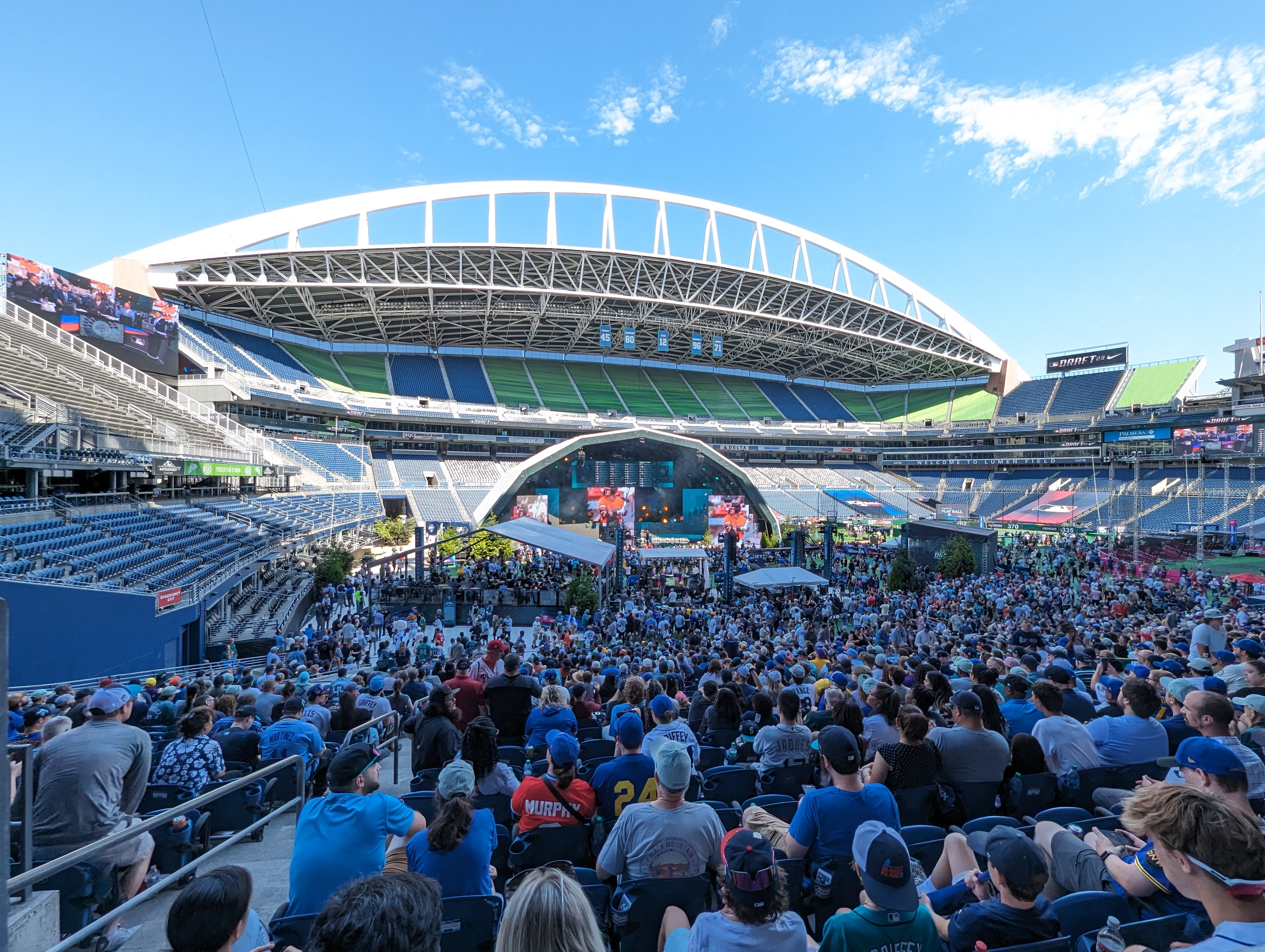
The 2023 Major League Baseball draft was held at Lumen Field.

The Major League Baseball draft (officially the Rule 4 Draft; also known as the first-year player draft or amateur draft) is the primary mechanism by which Major League Baseball (MLB) assigns amateur baseball players from high schools, colleges, and other amateur baseball clubs to its teams. The draft order is determined by a lottery system, starting in 2023, where teams that did not make the postseason in the previous year participate in a lottery process to determine the first six picks. The team with the worst record has the best odds of receiving the first pick. Prior to 2023, the draft order was based on the previous season's standings, with the worst team selecting first.

The first amateur draft was held in 1965. Unlike most sports drafts, the MLB draft is held mid-season, taking place in July since 2021. Another distinguishing feature of the draft compared to those of other North American major professional sports leagues is its sheer size: currently, the draft lasts for 20 rounds (600+ selections), in addition to compensatory picks introduced in 2021; until 2019, it lasted up to 40 rounds (1,200+ selections), and until 2011, it lasted up to 50 rounds (1,500+ selections). In contrast, the NFL draft lasts seven rounds (260 selections), the NHL entry draft lasts seven rounds (224 selections), the MLS SuperDraft lasts three rounds (87 selections), the CFL draft lasts eight rounds (72 selections), and the NBA draft is only two rounds (60 selections).

On March 26, 2020, MLB and the Major League Baseball Players Association (MLBPA) reached a deal that included the option to shorten that year's draft to five rounds, and halve the 2021 draft to 20 rounds. On March 10, 2022, after agreeing on a new collective bargaining agreement, it was decided that the first-round order would be based on a lottery participated by 18 non-postseason teams to determine the first six picks, starting with the 2023 draft. The remaining first-round picks and subsequent rounds are determined by the previous season's win-loss records for the first 18 selections in each round, followed by playoff finishes.

== Before the draft ==
Major League Baseball has used a draft to assign minor league players to teams since 1921. In 1936, the National Football League held the first amateur draft in professional sports. A decade later, the National Basketball Association instituted a similar method of player distribution. However, the player draft was controversial. Congressman Emanuel Celler questioned the legality of drafts during a series of hearings on the business practice of professional sports leagues in the 1950s. Successful clubs saw the draft as anti-competitive. Yankees executive Johnny Johnson equated it with communism. At the same time, Pulitzer Prize-winning sports columnist Arthur Daley compared the system to a "slave market."

Prior to the implementation of the first-year player draft, amateurs were free to sign with any Major League team that offered them a contract. As a result, wealthier teams such as the New York Yankees and St. Louis Cardinals were able to stockpile young talent, while poorer clubs were left to sign less desirable prospects.

In 1947, Major League Baseball implemented the bonus rule, a restriction aimed at reducing player salaries, as well as keeping wealthier teams from monopolizing the player market. In its most restrictive form, it forbade any team which gave an amateur a signing bonus of more than $4,000 from assigning that player to a minor league affiliate for two seasons. If the player was removed from the major league roster, he became a free agent. The controversial rule was repealed twice, only to be re-instituted.

The bonus rule was largely ineffective. There were accusations that teams were signing players to smaller bonuses, only to supplement them with under-the-table payments. In one famous incident, the Kansas City Athletics signed Clete Boyer, kept him on their roster for two years, then traded him to the Yankees just as he became eligible to be sent to the minor leagues. Other clubs accused the Yankees of using the Athletics as a de facto farm team, and the A's later admitted to signing Boyer on their behalf. By 1964, the total amount of money paid in signing bonuses to amateur players was greater than the amount spent on major league salaries; it was the bidding war that year for Rick Reichardt, who signed with the California Angels for the then outrageous bonus of $200,000, (about $1.8 million today) that finally led to the implementation of the draft.

Major League clubs voted on the draft during the 1964 Winter Meetings. Four teams—the New York Yankees, St. Louis Cardinals, Los Angeles Dodgers, and New York Mets—attempted to defeat the proposal, but they failed to convince a majority of teams, and in the end only the Cardinals voted against it.

== The draft ==
MLB player transactions are governed by The Official Professional Baseball Rules Book, (Note: This document governs MLB's business rules, not playing rules.) within which, Rule 4 governs the "First-Year Player Draft". Due to its place in the rules book, MLB's amateur draft is sometimes referred to as the "Rule 4 draft"; there is also a distinct Rule 5 draft.

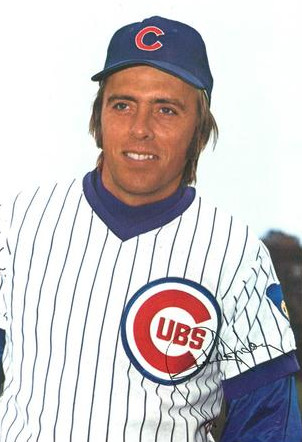
Rick Monday was the first player selected in a Major League Baseball draft, on June 8, 1965.

Major League Baseball's first amateur draft was held on June 8–9, 1965, in New York City. Teams chose players in reverse order of the previous season's standings, with picks alternating between the National and American Leagues. With the first pick, the Kansas City Athletics took Rick Monday, an outfielder from Arizona State University.

Originally, three separate drafts were held each year. The June draft, which was by far the largest, involved new high school graduates, as well as college seniors who had just finished their seasons. Another draft was held in January, which typically involved high school players who graduated in the winter, junior college players, and players who had dropped out of four-year colleges. Junior college players were required to wait until their current season was completed before they could sign. Finally, there was a draft in August for players who participated in amateur summer leagues. The August draft was eliminated after only two years, while the January draft lasted until 1986.

=== Influence of the draftee's age ===
Early on, the majority of players drafted came directly from high school. Between 1967 and 1971, only seven college players were chosen in the first round of the June draft. However, the college players who were drafted outperformed their high school counterparts by what statistician Bill James called "a laughably huge margin." By 1978, a majority of draftees had played college baseball, and by 2002, the number rose above sixty percent. While the number of high school players drafted has dropped, those picked have been more successful than their predecessors. In a study of drafts from 1984 to 1999, Baseball Prospectus writer Rany Jazayerli concluded that, by the 1990s, the gap in production between the two groups had nearly disappeared. In October 2011, Jazayerli presented another research study which included an analysis of those players drafted since 1965, but instead of breaking them into college or high school draftees, he segregated them by their age on draft day. In the study published in Baseball Prospectus, which included a follow-up article of the financial benefits, Jazayerli concluded that the very young players return more value than expected by their draft slots. In Jazayerli's study he looked at the statistics and broke draftees into five distinctive groups based on their age and being drafted in the early rounds. Jazayerli's defined a "very young" player as those who are younger than 17 years and 296 days on draft day. Since the inception of the draft, the youngest player ever drafted in an early round is Alfredo Escalera. Escalera was drafted by the Kansas City Royals in the eighth round of the 2012 draft at 17 years and 114 days. Jazayerli's study does not clearly demonstrate the influence of the player's age when drafted in a late round.

=== Economic impact ===
Initially, the draft succeeded in reducing the value of signing bonuses. In 1964, a year before the first draft, University of Wisconsin outfielder Rick Reichardt was given a record bonus of $200,000 (equivalent to $2,076,180 in 2025) by the California Angels. Without competition from other clubs, the Athletics were able to sign Rick Monday for a bonus of only $104,000 (equivalent to $1,062,513 in 2025). It would take until 1979 when USC pitcher Bill Bordley received a bonus higher than Reichardt's.

Player salaries continued to escalate through the 1980s. In 1986, Bo Jackson became the first draftee to sign a total contract (signing bonus and salary) worth over $1 million ($2,937,158 today). Jackson, a Heisman Trophy-winning football player for Auburn University, was also the first overall choice in the National Football League draft, and was offered a $7 million ($20,560,109 today) contract to play football for the Tampa Bay Buccaneers.

High school players possessed additional leverage, as they had the option of attending college and re-entering the draft the next year. Agent Scott Boras routinely exploited this advantage to increase the contracts of his clients. In 1990, Boras client Todd Van Poppel signed a $1.2 million ($2,957,208 today) contract with Oakland Athletics, after committing to play for the University of Texas. The following year, Boras negotiated a $1.55 million ($3,663,877 today) contract for Yankees first round pick Brien Taylor, who had said he would attend junior college if he did not receive a contract equal to Van Poppel's. By June 2009, a figure as high as $15 million was floated for collegiate pitcher Stephen Strasburg.

Increasingly, teams drafted based on whether or not a player was likely to sign for a particular amount of money, rather than on his talent. This became known as a "signability pick". Before the 1992 draft, team owners unilaterally decided to extend the period of time a team retained negotiating rights to a player from one year to five. In effect, the rule prohibited a high school draftee from attending college and re-entering the draft after his junior or senior seasons. The Major League Baseball Players Association filed a legal challenge, but Major League Baseball argued that, since the Players Association did not represent amateur players, it was not necessary for the union to agree to the change. An arbitrator ultimately decided that any change to draft articles must be negotiated with the Players Association.

=== Media exposure ===
The first-year player draft has historically had far less media exposure than its counterparts in the other leagues for three primary reasons:

- High school and college baseball, the primary sources of MLB draftees, are not nearly as popular as college football, college basketball, and, in Canada and certain parts of the U.S., college and junior hockey. Consequently, most prospective top draft picks were unknown to the casual sports observer at the time of their draft. However, this is slowly changing: NCAA baseball has enjoyed a spike in popularity in the 2000s and top collegiate baseball players have enjoyed greater media exposure, though still far below that of their basketball and football counterparts.
- Unlike top draft picks in the NHL, NBA, and NFL, all of whom are expected to make immediate impacts, top MLB draftees are nearly always assigned to the minor leagues for several years to hone their skills, usually at low levels (Rookie or Class A) initially. Due to this, fans cannot see the newly drafted players perform immediately, causing them to forget or lose interest in them. The entire 2007 first round (64 players) totaled one inning of major league playing time as of the end of the 2008 season; as of the 2009 season, the vast majority of 2008 first-rounders were still assigned to minor league organizations. In contrast, every first-round pick in the 2008 NFL draft had played in the league by the end of the 2008 season.
- While many NHL, NBA, and NFL draftees will eventually reach their respective leagues, the vast majority of players selected in the first-year player draft will never play in a single MLB game, including many first-rounders. For example, only 31 of 52 first-round draft picks in the 1997 draft eventually made a big-league appearance, and only 19 of those 31 appeared in more than 100 games as of 2021. In 1997's sixth round, only five of the 30 players selected eventually made a big league appearance, all of which pitchers, and only two of those five (Tim Hudson and Matt Wise) pitched more than 40 innings in the majors. Further illustrating the unpredictability of the draft's middle and later rounds, none of the 30 players selected in the 18th round ever reached the major leagues, but the 19th round eventually produced an all-star and World Series MVP, David Eckstein. Even stranger, Hall of Famer Mike Piazza was selected in the 62nd round, 1390th overall, of the 1988 draft.

The 2007 draft was the first to be televised live, on June 7, 2007. The draft coverage took place at Disney's Wide World of Sports Complex at Walt Disney World near Orlando, Florida. Since the 2009 draft, the first round of the draft has been broadcast annually on MLB Network live and in prime time from its studios in Secaucus, New Jersey, with ESPN simulcasting the first round since 2020. Since the 2021 draft, the event takes place during All-Star Weekend.

== Procedures and rules ==
=== Eligibility ===
To be drafted, a player must fit the following criteria:

- Be a resident of, or have attended an educational institution in, the United States, Canada, or a U.S. territory such as Puerto Rico. (Note: Canadians, Puerto Ricans and players from other U.S. territories first became eligible for the draft in 1991.) Players from other countries are not subject to the draft, and can be signed by any team unless they have attended an educational institution in the aforementioned areas.
- Has never signed a major or minor league contract.
- High school players are eligible only after graduation, and if they have not attended college.
- Players at four-year colleges and universities are eligible three years after first enrolling in such an institution, or after their 21st birthdays (whichever occurs first).
- Junior and community college players are eligible to be drafted at any time.

=== Draft order ===
From the 2023 draft, as part of the new collective bargaining agreement (CBA), the general draft order in the first round will be based on a lottery participated by 18 teams which did not make the postseason in the past season to determine the first six picks in the draft, with the three worst clubs having an equal chance of winning the top overall pick. The postseason teams are determined by which round the team was eliminated, first teams eliminated in the Wild Card Series, then Division Series, League Championship Series losers, the World Series loser, and last the World Series winner). Additionally, within each playoff group, teams will be sorted by revenue-sharing status and then reverse order of winning percentage. In each subsequent round, the first 18 selections are still determined by the preceding season's standings and the remaining picks are also based on the postseason clubs' results. Revenue-sharing recipient teams are limited to receiving lottery picks in two consecutive drafts and non-recipients can get one of the top six selections in a single draft year only. Also, a lottery-ineligible, non-postseason club can only select 10th overall or lower. The 2022 CBA ratified the draft's reduction to 20 rounds. Unlike other professional sports drafts, MLB teams can only trade certain draft picks, limited to those awarded in the Competitive Balance Rounds.

The order was the reverse order of the previous year's standings, until 2022. If two teams finished with identical records, the previous year's standings of the two teams was the tiebreaker, with the team having a worse record receiving the higher pick.

Status	Draft picks
Non-postseason teams	1–18
Eliminated in Wild Card Series	19–22
Eliminated in Division Series	23–26
League Championship Series losers	27-28
World Series loser	29
World Series winner	30

=== Negotiating rights ===
Prior to 2007, a team retained the rights to sign a selected player until one week prior to the next draft, or until the player enters, or returns to, a four-year college on a full-time basis. This was known as the "draft and follow" procedure. Notable players who have been drafted and signed via the draft-and-follow procedure include Mark Buehrle, Roy Oswalt, Andy Pettitte, Jorge Posada and Reggie Sanders.

Since 2012, the deadline for signing a drafted player is July 15. A selected player who enters a junior college cannot be signed until the conclusion of the school's baseball season. A player who is drafted and does not sign with the club that selected him may be drafted again at a future year's draft, so long as the player is eligible for that year's draft. A club may not select a player again in a subsequent year, unless the player has consented to the re-selection. Each drafted player can sign a bonus and each bonus is based on the player draft position and value as well.

A player who is eligible to be selected and is passed over by every club becomes a free agent and may sign with any club, up until one week before the next draft, or until the player enters, or returns to, a four-year college full-time or enters, or returns to, a junior college. In the one-week period before any draft, which is called the "closed period", the general rule is that no club may sign a new player.

The 2022 CBA reinstated the draft-and-follow option for players drafted after the 10th round who opt to attend junior college and are eligible to sign with their drafting clubs before the following draft.

=== Prospect Promotion Incentive picks ===
Prospect Promotion Incentive (PPI) picks were introduced in the 2022 CBA as a way to motivate teams to promote their talented prospects to the major leagues sooner. Prior to the PPI, teams would keep their top prospects in the minor leagues for a few weeks to earn additional years of team control, a tactic known as service time manipulation.

PPI picks are awarded if a PPI-eligible player accrues a full year of service as a rookie, and then wins the Rookie of the Year, or finishes within the top 3 in either Most Valuable Player or Cy Young voting before reaching arbitration, often giving players three years of eligibility. Teams are only allowed one PPI pick per year, and players can only earn one PPI pick in their careers

==== Player eligibility ====
To be eligible for a PPI pick, a player must be ranked within the top 100 on at least two of the three top 100 prospect rankings from MLB Pipeline, Baseball America, and ESPN. These players must be rookie-eligible and have less than 60 days of service time. A player can lose their eligibility by reaching salary arbitration, earning a PPI pick, or if they are traded after making their MLB debut.

=== Compensatory picks ===
Currently, teams can earn compensatory picks in the draft based on departing free agents who reject a Qualifying Offer from their respective team. A qualifying offer is defined as a one-year contract worth the average value of the top 120 player contracts for that year (in 2015, the value of the qualifying offer was $15.8 million). The 2013 draft saw major changes to the compensation rules. This was implemented as part of the previous CBA between MLB and its players' union, which took effect with the 2012 season.

==== Pre-2013 rules ====
Before the 2013 draft, free agents were ranked by the Elias Sports Bureau based on their previous two years of playing, and against players of similar positions. Players were categorized as either Type A or Type B, or fell into the category of all other players. Below is a description of each free agent class and the compensation the free agent's former team received when the player signed with a different team.

- A Type A free agent was ranked in the top 20 percent of players at his position. A team that signed a Type A player gave its top draft pick to the club that the player left; that club also received a supplemental pick in the "sandwich" round between the first and second rounds.
- A Type B free agent was ranked below the top 20 percent but in the top 40 percent of players at his position. A team that lost a Type B player received a supplemental pick, but the signing team did not lose a pick.
- All other players carried no compensation at all. There had previously been a third class of "Type C" players, but that was eliminated in the 2007 CBA.

To earn a compensatory pick, a free agent must have been either signed before the arbitration deadline in early December, or offered arbitration by their former team but still signed with another team.

Compensatory picks that one team gave another via this method were the highest available pick that team had, with the exception of picks in the top half of the first round. These picks were protected from being used as compensation. If a team that picked in the top half of the first draft signed a Type A free agent, they would give up their second-round pick. If a team owed two other teams draft picks via Type A free agents, the team whose departing player had a higher score got the higher-ranked pick. A team could not lose picks it earned via compensation. The post-2012 rules for this aspect of the draft are similar, except that the "Type A" and "Type B" designations no longer exist (see below).

The order of the supplemental round between the first and second rounds, a feature that remains in place in 2013 and beyond, is determined by inverse order of the previous year's standings. Under pre-2013 rules, Type A picks were made first, and then the order reset for all the Type B compensation picks.

In a feature that did not change with the old CBA in 2012, teams can also earn compensation for unsigned picks from the previous year's draft. If a team doesn't sign a first or second round pick, they will get to pick at the same slot plus one the following year. For example, if the team with the No. 5 pick does not sign that player, they would have the No. 6 pick the following year. The regular draft order would continue around those picks. For compensation for not signing a third round pick, teams would get a pick in a supplemental round between the third and fourth rounds. If a team fails to sign a player with one of these compensated picks, there is no compensation the following year.

==== Current rules ====
For the 2012 draft, the previous "Type A" and "Type B" designations remained in place, but the CBA included special provisions that modified the statuses of 11 players who were Type A free agents under the 2007 CBA. Six of these were "Modified Type A"—meaning that the signing team did not forfeit a draft pick, but the player's former team received a compensatory pick in the same position it would have earned under regular Type A rules. The remaining five were "Modified Type B", with compensation identical to that for other Type B free agents.

Since the 2013 draft, free agents are no longer classified by "type". Instead, a team is only able to receive compensation if it makes its former player an offer at least equal to the average of the 125 richest contracts. However, if a player is traded during the final season of his contract, his new team will be ineligible to receive any compensation.

Starting with the 2023 draft, the 2022 CBA provides for the awarding of compensatory draft picks under the following:

- Clubs that receive revenue sharing will receive a third-round pick if the player signs for more than $35 million total or $18 million in average annual value, a compensation round B pick if the player signs for more than $55 million or $23 million in average annual value, a compensation round A pick if the player signs for more than $100 million or $30 million in average annual value, or a third-round pick and compensation round A pick if the player signs for more than $150 million or $40 million in average annual value.
- Clubs that do not receive revenue sharing but also not go over the competitive balance tax (CBT) will receive a third-round pick if the player signs for more than $55 million or $23 million in average annual value, a compensation round B pick if the player signs for more than $100 million or $30 million in average annual value, or a compensation round A pick if the player signs for more than $150 million or $40 million in average annual value.
- Clubs that go over the CBT will receive a third-round pick if the player signs for more than $100 million or $30 million in average annual value or a compensation round B pick if the player signs for more than $150 million or $40 million in average annual value.

=== Other changes from 2012 ===
The previous CBA introduced other significant changes to the draft.

==== Bonus pool ====
From the 2012 draft on, each team is allocated a "bonus pool" from which it can offer initial contracts to its drafted players. Each team's pool is based on its draft position and number of picks, plus the amount spent in the previous year's draft. For the 2012 draft, these pools ranged from $4.5 million to $11.5 million. If a team goes over its threshold by 5 percent or less, it must pay a "luxury tax" of 75% on the amount over the threshold. Teams that go 5 to 10 percent over must pay a 100% tax on the excess, and will lose their next first-round pick. A team that goes 15 percent over can lose its next two first-round picks, in addition to the "luxury tax". These excess picks will go to smaller-revenue teams via a yet-to-be-reported formula. Uniquely, these compensatory picks can be traded—marking the first time MLB has allowed trading of draft picks. However, all previous rules against trading of regular picks, or picks awarded as free agent compensation, remain in force.

==== New signing rules ====
Teams can no longer offer major league contracts to their draft choices—only minor league contracts are available. The only exception is for drafted players who have scholarships in other sports. Also, the date for signing new picks has moved from mid-August to mid-July. However, the deadline was moved to early August in 2021 to compensate for the new date of the MLB Draft.

== See also ==
- List of first overall Major League Baseball draft picks
