= James Click =

American baseball executive (born 1978)

Toronto Blue Jays
- Vice President
- Born: February 14, 1978 (age 48); Durham, North Carolina

Teams
- Tampa Bay Rays (2005–2019); Houston Astros (2020–2022); Toronto Blue Jays (2023–present)

Career highlights and awards
- World Series champion (2022)

James Click (born February 14, 1978) is an American baseball executive who is a vice president of the Toronto Blue Jays of Major League Baseball. Click previously served in the Tampa Bay Rays organization for 15 years before being hired by the Houston Astros as their general manager in January 2020.

== Early life ==
Click is from Durham, North Carolina. He graduated from Yale University in 2000 with a Bachelor of Arts in history. After he graduated, Click wrote for Baseball Prospectus, helping to maintain their PECOTA algorithm.

== Career ==
=== Tampa Bay Rays ===
After being recommended by Chaim Bloom, who worked with Click at Baseball Prospectus, Click joined the Tampa Bay Rays as an intern in 2005, and the team hired him for their front office in 2006. He was promoted to vice president of baseball operations in 2017.

=== Houston Astros ===
In January 2020, the Houston Astros hired Click as their general manager following the dismissal of Jeff Luhnow. In 2022, the Astros won 106 games, the second-highest total in franchise history. They advanced to the World Series and defeated the Philadelphia Phillies in six games to give Click his first career World Series championship. After his contract expired after the 2022 season, Click rejected a one-year contract offer from the Astros and the team announced that they would move on without Click.

=== Toronto Blue Jays ===
On February 27, 2023, the Toronto Blue Jays hired James Click as vice president for baseball strategy.

== Personal life ==
Click's wife, Ace Padian, also graduated from Yale in 2000. The couple has two children.
