= Steve Balboni =

American baseball player (born 1957)

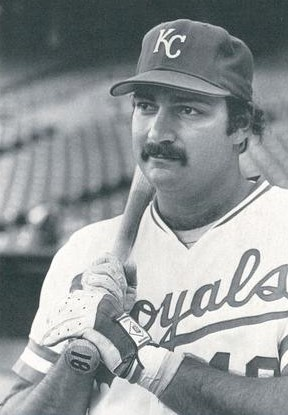
- First baseman / Designated hitter
- Born: January 16, 1957 (age 69); Brockton, Massachusetts, U.S.
- Batted: Right Threw: Right

MLB debut
- April 22, 1981, for the New York Yankees

Last MLB appearance
- October 2, 1993, for the Texas Rangers

MLB statistics
- Batting average: .229
- Home runs: 181
- Runs batted in: 495
- Stats at Baseball Reference

Teams
- New York Yankees (1981–1983); Kansas City Royals (1984–1988); Seattle Mariners (1988); New York Yankees (1989–1990); Texas Rangers (1993)

Career highlights and awards
- World Series champion (1985)

Stephen Charles Balboni (/bælˈboʊni/; born January 16, 1957) is an American former professional baseball first baseman. He played in Major League Baseball (MLB) for the New York Yankees, Seattle Mariners, Kansas City Royals, and Texas Rangers. He was a player with home run power and a tendency to strike out. He was nicknamed "Bye Bye" because of his home run hitting prowess. He was also known by the nickname "Bones", which is a malapropism for Balboni. He is also known for the "Curse of the Balboni", an idea written about by Rany Jazayerli which said no baseball team with a player hitting more than 36 home runs for that team could win the World Series. Since Balboni was the last player to hit 36 home runs and win a World Series, (1985 Royals), the curse bore his name. The curse ran from 1985 until Luis Gonzalez and the Arizona Diamondbacks won the 2001 World Series.

== College career ==
Born in Brockton, Massachusetts, Balboni attended Manchester Memorial High School in Manchester, New Hampshire and Eckerd College in St. Petersburg, Florida. In 1976 and 1977, he played collegiate summer baseball in the Cape Cod Baseball League (CCBL) for the Falmouth Commodores (1976) and the Yarmouth-Dennis Red Sox (1977). In 1977, he led the CCBL in home runs (13), was named league MVP, and was also the MVP of the league all-star game at Fenway Park. In 2006, he was inducted into the CCBL Hall of Fame.

He was drafted by the New York Yankees in the second round of the free agent draft in 1978. The Yankees noted that Balboni's tremendous power helped them make the decision to draft him. He was named designated hitter on The Sporting News college All-America team in 1978.

== Minor league career ==
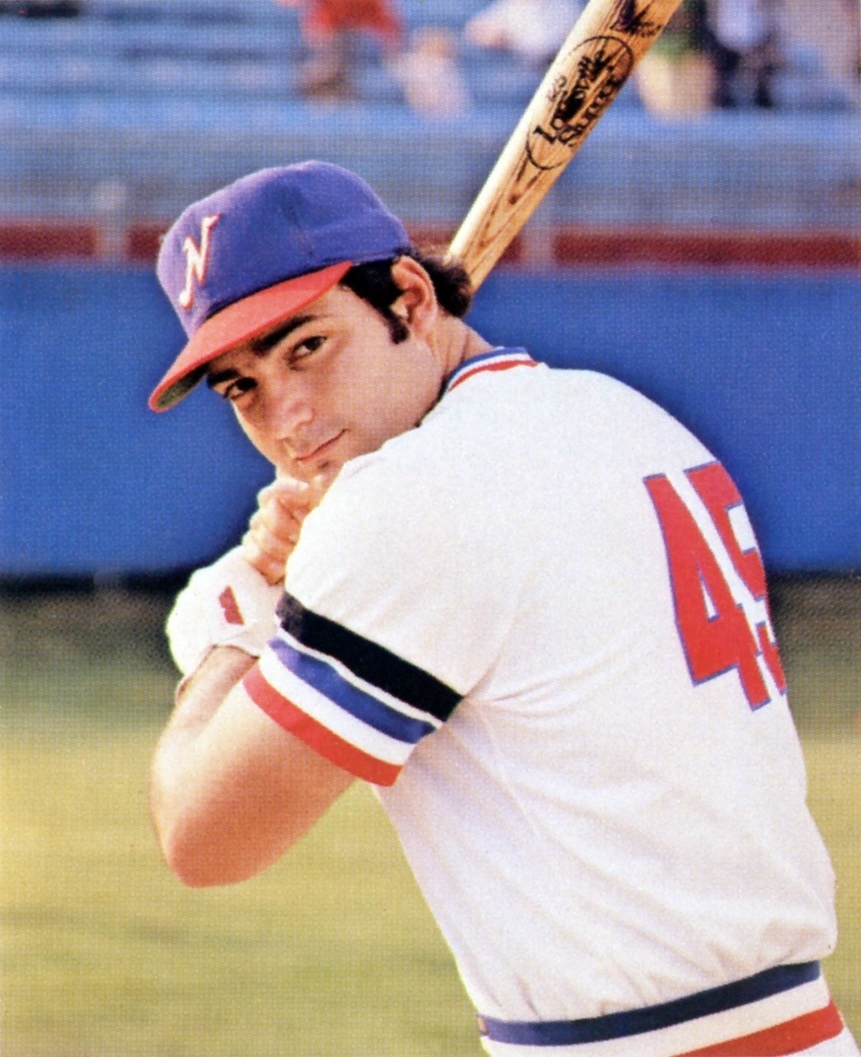
Balboni with the Nashville Sounds in 1980

Balboni played in the minors off and on from 1978 to 1993. In a total of nine seasons in the minors, he hit 239 home runs and drove in 772 runs. He also struck out 930 times. His career minor league batting average was .261. He won the Most Valuable Player award in 1979 with the Fort Lauderdale Yankees of the Florida State League and the Southern League MVP Award in 1980 for the Double-A Nashville Sounds.

Balboni led the league in home runs six different seasons: 1979, 1980, 1981, 1982, 1992 and 1993. He led the league in runs batted in in four seasons: 1979, 1980, 1981 and 1992. He led the league in strikeouts in two seasons: 1979 and 1981. He homered every 14.6 at bats and struck out every 3.8 at bats in the minors.

== Major league career ==
Balboni made it to the New York Yankees in 1981. He went on to play in the big leagues through 1990 with a short comeback in 1993. He played for the Yankees from 1981 to 1983 until the Yankees traded him along with Roger Erickson to the Kansas City Royals for Mike Armstrong and Duane Dewey (minor leaguer). He returned to the Yankees for the 1989 and 1990 seasons when the Seattle Mariners traded him to the Yankees for Dana Ridenour (minor leaguer). He was the starting first baseman for the Kansas City Royals from 1984 to mid-1988, when the Seattle Mariners signed him as a free agent. He only played one season in Seattle.

In parts of 11 Major League seasons in which he played in 960 games, Balboni hit 181 home runs and had 495 RBI. He also struck out 856 times. His batting average was .229 (714-for-3120) and his OPS was .743. He homered every 17.2 at-bats and struck out every 3.6 at-bats in the Major Leagues.

In 1985, Balboni led the American League with 166 strikeouts. He also set the single-season home run mark for the Royals with 36. That record stood until Mike Moustakas surpassed it in 2017. However, that year turned out to be his best season for many reasons. He had career highs in games played (160), at-bats (600), hits (146), runs (74), doubles (28), triples (2), homers (36), and runs batted in (88-tied in 1986). He led American League first basemen with 1686 total chances and 1573 putouts in 1985. He was also the Royals' starting first baseman in the 1985 World Series. Balboni batted .320 with 3 RBIs to help the Royals beat the St. Louis Cardinals, four games to three. He contributed a key single in the bottom of the ninth inning of Game 6, as the Royals rallied from a 1–0 deficit to win 2–1, and extend the series to seven games. He also demonstrated good glove work in the field, something he was not known for during his career. After retiring, he moved on to another team known as the Royals – The Flor-Mad Royals of Madison, New Jersey.

Balboni has been a resident of Berkeley Heights, New Jersey. He was elected to the International League Hall of Fame in 2011.
