= Peripheral ERA =

Peripheral ERA (PERA) is a pitching statistic created by the Baseball Prospectus team. It is the expected earned run average taking into account park-adjusted hits, walks, strikeouts, and home runs allowed. Unlike Voros McCracken's DIPS, hits allowed are included. PERA doesn't attempt to eliminate the effect of luck on batted balls away from ERA, instead attempting to account for good (or bad) luck in the combinations of hits, walks, home runs, and strikeouts. A lower PERA than EqERA (adjusted ERA) may indicate poor luck which may even itself out in the future, leading to a lower EqERA despite no change in quality of pitching.

== See also ==
- Baseball statistics
- Batting park factor
- Earned run average
- QERA
- Sabermetrics
