= Keith Law (writer) =

American sportswriter (born 1973)

- Born: June 1, 1973 (age 53); Smithtown, New York, U.S.
- Occupation: Baseball writer
- Website: meadowparty.com/blog/

Keith Law (born June 1, 1973) is an American baseball writer for The Athletic. He previously wrote for ESPN.com and ESPN Scouts, Inc from 2006 – 2019. He was formerly a writer for Baseball Prospectus and worked in the front office for the Toronto Blue Jays. He is a member of the Baseball Writers' Association of America.

== Early life ==
Born on June 1, 1973, Law grew up in Smithtown, New York, on Long Island. He graduated with honors from Harvard University, where he majored in sociology and economics. He received his Master of Business Administration from Carnegie Mellon's Tepper School of Business.

== Career ==
He began writing for Baseball Prospectus in 1997. Unlike many other Baseball Prospectus authors, Law's primary influence was not Bill James, but Eddie Epstein, the writer of the first STATS, Inc. Minor League Scouting Notebook.

In 2002, Law was hired by the Toronto Blue Jays as a "Consultant to Baseball Operations" after impressing Blue Jays' general manager J. P. Ricciardi during the offseason winter meetings. Paul DePodesta had recommended Law to him, and Ricciardi asked Law's opinions regarding the approaching Rule 5 draft of that year, and, impressed with Law's answers and explanations, offered him a position with the team. During his time with the Blue Jays, he acted as a major league and minor league scout, contract negotiator, and provided assistance to the team's marketing and sales staffs. Law reached the position of "Special Assistant to the GM" before resigning in 2006 to work at ESPN.

At ESPN, Law worked as baseball scouting writer. He writes baseball columns, maintains a blog, provides analysis on radio and television, and holds weekly chats on his blog. He also previously hosted a weekly ESPN podcast, Behind the Dish, and currently hosts a weekly podcast at The Athletic called The Keith Law Show.

On December 29, 2011, Ken Rosenthal of Fox Sports reported that Law interviewed for a number of front office positions with the Houston Astros, including the title of Scouting Director. Despite all of this, Keith Law decided to remain with ESPN in order to spend more time with his family.

In November 2014, Law got into a day-long Twitter argument with pitcher Curt Schilling over the creation–evolution controversy, defending evolution against Schilling's creationist arguments, after which ESPN decided to suspend Law's Twitter account. ESPN commented that "Keith’s Twitter suspension had absolutely nothing to do with his opinions on the subject," but it remains unclear what other motivation is behind the act, since the conversation between Schilling and Law reportedly "never really turned hostile", with many reading the details feeling that his suspension was "ridiculous". When a bystander ordered him to 'Stick to baseball', Law replied "No, I won't. Science is infinitely more important", later emphasizing that "I haven't criticized or questioned anyone's faith. I oppose anti-science, that's all". Law concluded by tweeting "Eppur si muove.", meaning "And yet it moves", apocryphally said to have been uttered by Galileo when the Catholic Church forced him to recant his statements about heliocentricity.

In 2017 Law released his first book on baseball statistics titled Smart Baseball: The Story behind the Old Stats That Are Ruining the Game, the New Ones That Are Running It, and the Right Way to Think about Baseball. His second book The Inside Game: Bad Calls, Strange Moves, and What Baseball Behavior Teaches Us About Ourselves was released in April 2020.

=== Baseball Writers' Association of America ===
In December 2007, Law was denied admission to the Baseball Writers' Association of America, members of whom vote for Baseball Hall of Fame candidates and several annual awards including the Most Valuable Player and Cy Young Award. While 16 other internet baseball columnists were admitted in their first year of eligibility, ESPN's Law and Rob Neyer were refused due to the BBWAA's perception that Law and Neyer did not attend enough games in person. In 2008, however, Law was admitted to the BBWAA along with Neyer and Baseball Prospectus writers Christina Kahrl and Will Carroll. On his 2009 NL Cy Young ballot, Law listed Javier Vázquez in front of Adam Wainwright and did not include Chris Carpenter on the three name ballot, which elicited strong reactions from St. Louis Cardinals fans. Law stated, "Carpenter's innings total was the main reason he ended up off my ballot. He pitched extremely well when on the mound, but not well enough to close the value gap between him and the three pitchers I listed, each of whom threw at least 27 innings more than Carpenter".

=== The Athletic ===
On January 6, 2020, Law joined The Athletic as a Senior Baseball Writer.

== Other interests ==
Law's main interests outside of baseball are cuisine, German-style board games, and literature. For these other interests, he maintains the personal website meadowparty.com, which includes a food and literature blog, and reviews of board games. On the Season Four disc of Home Movies, he recorded two commentary tracks. Law currently lives in Delaware with his family. Law has been outspoken about his struggle and treatment of his anxiety disorder.
