= Fantasy Focus (XM radio program) =

- Genre: Fantasy Sports talk
- Running time: 1 hour
- Country of origin: (United States) US
- Home station: XM Radio
- Starring: Jeff Erickson; John Sickels
- Original release: 2005 – present

Fantasy Focus is a one-hour show from RotoWire.com focused on fantasy baseball on Blogtalkradio. From 2005 to 2008 the show ran on XM Radio's Home Plate 175 channel.
