= Equivalent average =

Equivalent Average (EqA) is a baseball metric invented by Clay Davenport and intended to express the production of hitters in a context independent of park and league effects. It represents a hitter's productivity using the same scale as batting average. Thus, a hitter with an EqA over .300 is a very good hitter, while a hitter with an EqA of .220 or below is poor. An EqA of .260 is defined as league average.

The date EqA was invented cannot readily be documented, but references to it were being offered on the rec.sport.baseball usenet group as early as January 14, 1996. Baseball Prospectus renamed it True Average (TAv) in 2010, in an attempt to make it more accessible.

== Definition and rationale ==
In the formula given in the box above, the abbreviations are H=Hit, TB=Total bases, BB=Bases on balls (walks), HBP=Hit by pitch, SB=Stolen base, SH=Sacrifice hit (typically, sacrifice bunt), SF=Sacrifice fly, AB=At bat, CS=Caught stealing.

EqA is one of several sabermetric approaches which validated the notion that minor league hitting statistics can be useful measurements of Major League ability. It does this by adjusting a player's raw statistics for park and league effects.

For instance, the Pacific Coast League is a minor league known to be a very friendly venue for hitters. Therefore, a hitter in the PCL may have notably depressed raw statistics (a lower batting average, fewer home runs, etc.) if he were hitting in another league at the same level. Additionally, in general the level of competition at the PCL is lower than that in the Majors, so a hitter in the PCL would likely have lesser raw statistics in the Majors. EqA is thus useful to strip certain illusions from the surface of players' raw statistics.

EqA is a derivative of Raw EqA, or REqA. REqA is (H + TB + 1.5*(BB + HBP + SB) + SH + SF) divided by (AB + BB + HBP + SH + SF + CS + SB). REqA in turn is adjusted to account for league difficulty and scale to create EqA.

EqA has been used for several years by the authors of the Baseball Prospectus. It is also one of the statistics predicted for each hitter in Baseball Prospectus's annual PECOTA forecasts.

EqA is scaled like a batting average, which is the number of safe hits divided by the number of official at bats. However, Davenport EqA aims to capture not so many hits per at bat but instead "runs produced per at bat". In that sense, EqA is akin to a larger family of run estimators that sabermetricians use.

== See also ==
- Total player rating
- Value over replacement player
- Win shares
