= John Perrotto =

American journalist

John Perrotto is an American sports journalist who has written for The Beaver County Times, Baseball Prospectus, DKPittsburghsports.com, and Basketball Prospectus in his varied career. He is a member of the Baseball Writers' Association of America and a voter in the annual Baseball Hall of Fame election and occasionally other annual Major League Baseball awards.

Perrotto is a regular contributor to the “BP Daily” column on ESPN Insider and a writer for the Baseball Prospectus annual book. Perrotto resides in Pittsburgh.

== Career ==
A graduate of Western Beaver High School (1981) and Geneva College (BA, 1985, English/Communications), Perrotto began his career as a sports writer for the Beaver County Times while still in college. His main beat was the Pittsburgh Pirates.

As an established baseball writer for the Beaver County Times since 1982, as well as for Baseball America since 1990, Perrotto joined the Baseball Prospectus (BP) staff in February 2007 as its first beat writer. For BP, he wrote two by-lined columns, “On the Beat” and “Every Given Sunday,” covering news and inside dope on organizational activities in all of Major League Baseball.

In November 2007, Perrotto also joined the staff of the online BasketballProspectus.com, for whom he wrote regular "Around the Rim" and “On the Beat” columns. Basketball Prospectus was affiliated with Baseball Prospectus as part of Prospectus Entertainment Ventures, LLC.

Perrotto was hired by the Pittsburgh Pirates majority owner Bob Nutting in January 2008 to write about the Pirates at Piratereport.com. Perrotto had left his position as a reporter for the Beaver County Times in December 2008 after the paper scaled back its beat coverage of the Pirates team. According to reports, Pirate Report executives were dissatisfied with the negative tone of his coverage. In October, 2009, Perotto was replaced by veteran baseball writer-columnist and Hall of Fame voter Paul Ladewski, a decision that left him admittedly bitter and angry.

In January 2010, Perrotto became a full-time employee of Baseball Prospectus as well as editor-in-chief of BaseballProspectus.com. He served in that role for one year. In January 2011, Perrotto returned to the Beaver County Times as a contributor. Six years later, Perrotto was hired as a Pirates beat reporter with DK Sports Pittsburgh. His tenure at DK Pittsburgh Sports ended after less than two seasons due to reported disagreements over editorial and business direction with site founder and editor-in-chief Dejan Kovacevic. In 2020, he underwent successful triple-bypass heart surgery.

== Credits ==
Perrotto has two film credits, for appearing as himself on "ESPN Sports Century" (2001) and "ESPN 25: Who’s #1?” (2005).
