= Christina Kahrl =

American sportswriter

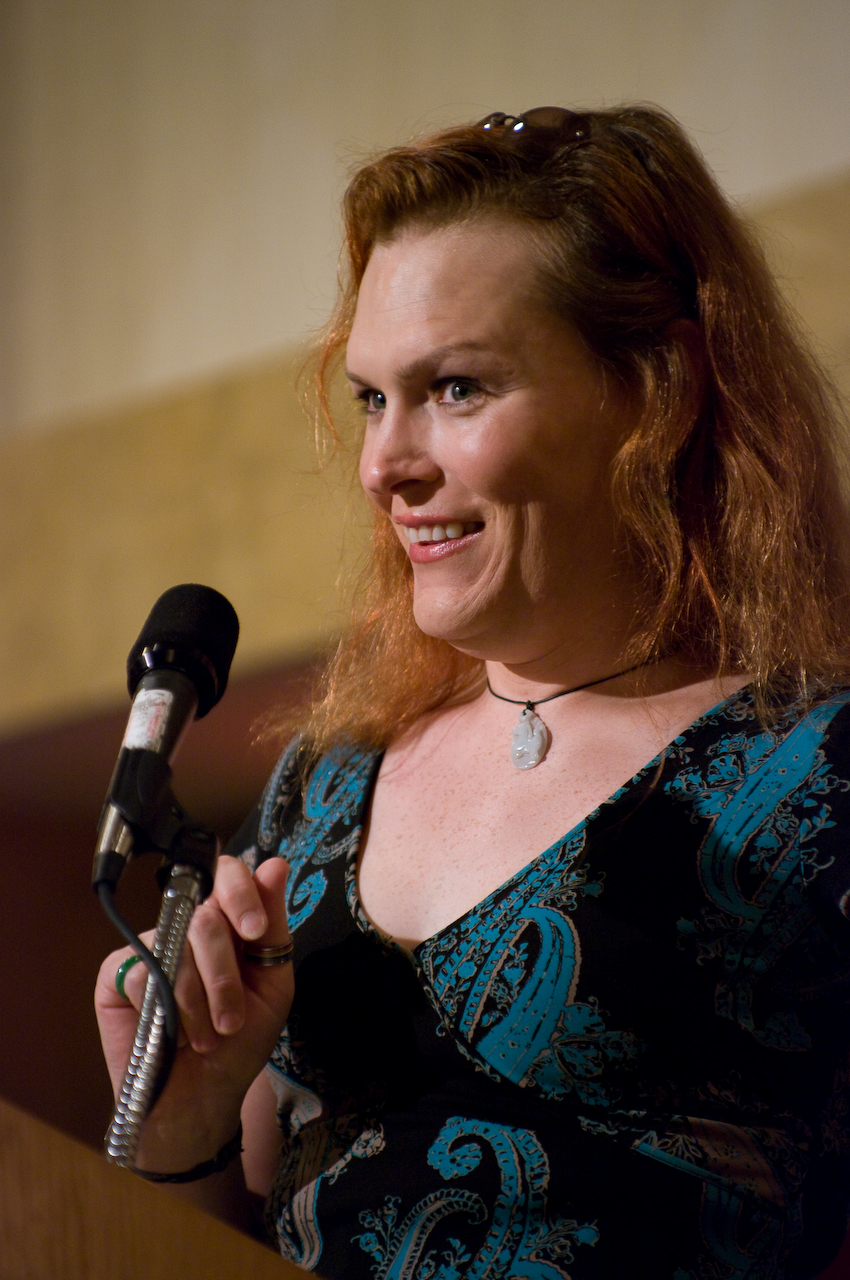
- Kahrl in 2009.
- Known for: Co-founder of Baseball Prospectus

Christina Kahrl is one of the co-founders of Baseball Prospectus. She is the former executive editor of the think tank's website, BaseballProspectus.com, the former managing editor for their annual publication, former writer and editor for ESPN.com, and is currently sports editor of the San Francisco Chronicle. She is a member of the Baseball Writers' Association of America.

Kahrl is an activist on civil rights issues for the transgender community in her hometown of Chicago and a member of the Equality Illinois board of directors. The story of her coming out as a transgender sportswriter in 2003 was part of a GLAAD award-nominated segment entitled "Transitions" on HBO's Real Sports that aired in 2010.

== Background ==
Kahrl graduated from El Camino High School in Sacramento, California in 1985. She graduated from the University of Chicago in 1990, with a concentration in Modern European History and a minor concentration in Ancient History. She was a member of Phi Kappa Psi fraternity. In 2000, she earned an MA in Public History from Loyola University Chicago.

== Career ==
From 2000 to 2005, Kahrl was employed as an acquisitions editor at Brassey's Sports, a mid-list publisher that focused on sports history and analysis.

After the launch of BaseballProspectus.com in 1996, of which she was a founding member, she contributed a regular column entitled "Transaction Analysis," listing and analyzing the transactions (player trades, contract signings, promotions and demotions) by all Major League Baseball teams for the site. In 2011, she kicked off a new standalone opinion and argument column for the site entitled "Purpose Pitches." She was a co-editor of nine of the Baseball Prospectus annual volumes of baseball statistics and analysis.

Kahrl has also written for SportsIllustrated.com, ESPN.com, the New York Sun, Salon.com, Slate, Playboy, and the Washington Blade, and was an associate editor of The ESPN Pro Football Encyclopedia.

In 2008, Kahrl was accepted as a member of the Baseball Writers' Association of America and thus became eligible to vote on Major League Baseball post-season awards and nominees for the National Baseball Hall of Fame. She voted for the American League Rookie of the Year in 2009 and for the National League Manager of the Year in 2010. Reflecting on the meaning of her election, Kahrl wrote, "While I expect to still write about transactions, I really want to try and breathe new life back into the game story as an art form, and perhaps in my conceit try to take pages from Runyon and Lardner and Pete Palmer and Keith Woolner to provide something old and something new, all at once."

In April 2011, Kahrl announced that she would be joining ESPN.com to write and edit, teaming up with David Schoenfield in penning the "SweetSpot" blog, which provides a sabermetrics-driven analysis on the goings-on in baseball.

On November 10, 2016, Kahrl announced she has been promoted to MLB Senior Editor at ESPN and will be relocating to ESPN Headquarters in Connecticut.

Kahrl became sports editor of The San Francisco Chronicle in March 2021.

In 2014 Kahrl was inducted into the Chicago Gay and Lesbian Hall of Fame.

== Activism ==
Since 2007, Kahrl has been active in the LGBT community, helping out with transgender programming at the Center on Halsted, running the support group and adding a seminar series and an open mic night to its programming, as well as speaking about activist efforts in the area. She has spoken to local student groups and on college campuses about acceptance of transgender people in society and in sports, and on transgender issues. She is a member of the board of Illinois Gender Advocates (IGA), and co-chair of IGA's action committee.

As an activist and board member for Equality Illinois, Kahrl has been actively involved in an effort to curb police harassment of transgender Chicagoans, and has helped launch the Trans-Friendly Bathroom Initiative with fellow activists from Genderqueer Chicago. She has also helped organize the public observation of Transgender Day of Remembrance in Chicago. She has also discussed the nature of transness at the Chicago History Museum, stating, "You have to explain to people that, no, this (being transgender) does not mean that you are supergay, although it's sweet of you to say so. Forging acceptance in the face of inevitable confusion and concern is the diplomatic mission of a lifetime, for each and every transsexual." On November 8, 2013 it was announced that she had been named to GLAAD's Board of Directors.

Kahrl, who identifies as transgender and bisexual, married Charley Wanamaker in 2014.
