= Gambling.com Group =

Sports betting media company

- Type: Public
- Traded as: Nasdaq: GAMB
- Founded: 2006
- Founders: Charles Gillespie; Kevin McCrystle
- Website: www.gambling.com

Gambling.com Group is a sports betting media company founded in 2006.

== History ==
Gambling.com Group was founded in 2006 by Charles Gillespie and Kevin McCrystle.

In September 2019, the company secured $15.5 million in investment from growth equity firm Edison Partners.

In July 2021, Gambling.com Group was listed on the Nasdaq stock exchange as GAMB.

In January 2022, Gambling.com Group acquired Roto Sports for $27.5 million.

In February 2022, Gambling.com Group acquired news publishing company NDC Media for $69 million.
