= Will Carroll =

American sportswriter

William Carroll (born June 30, 1970) is an American sportswriter who specializes in the coverage of medical issues, including injuries and performance-enhancing drugs. Carroll's "Under the Knife" column appeared on Baseball Prospectus for eight years during his stint there as a senior writer, and he also contributed to the site's radio efforts as well as the Puck Prospectus spin-off site. He is the author of two books on sports-related medical topics.

Carroll was a member of the Baseball Writers' Association of America and the Pro Football Writers Association.

In 2014, he was given a MORE Award by the American Academy of Orthopaedic Surgeons for his story on Dr. Frank Jobe published in Bleacher Report in 2013.

== Career ==
In 2003 Carroll joined the staff of Baseball Prospectus, for whom he served as its injury expert and wrote a regular "Under the Knife" column and periodic "Team Health Reports" as well as hosts Baseball Prospectus Radio. In February 2009, he assumed the role of Executive Editor of Puck Prospectus. In September 2010, Carroll announced his departure from Baseball Prospectus and published his last "Under the Knife" column.

In 2006, Carroll served as the injury expert for the short-lived The Fantasy Show on ESPN.

Starting in 2007, Carroll has worked as an NFL injury expert for SI.com. He has also served as a senior writer for Football Outsiders, focusing on football injuries.

In 2011, he joined SI.com, bringing both his "Under The Knife" (baseball) and "Injury Report" (football) devoted to sports injuries.

In 2013, he joined Bleacher Report as the lead writer for sports injuries. He left in 2015.

In 2014 at a public appearance in Dallas, Carroll admitted he worked as a consultant for at least one MLB team as well as for several other teams. It is believed the teams are the Milwaukee Brewers and Seattle Mariners. In 2014, he was one of the premiere hosts for Bleacher Report Radio on SiriusXM Satellite Radio. He hosted Afternoon Drive with Jason Goff. He left in early 2015.

Carroll was one of the panelists, along with Jason Whitlock, for the premiere week of the ROME show on CBS Sports Network.

In 2015, Carroll joined FanDuel, a Scottish fantasy sports company. His role was unclear, but appears to have been instrumental in hiring several other writers. In an interview at FSTA 2015, Carroll stated he was brought in to help upgrade injury notifications in the FanDuel app.

Although an expert on injuries, Carroll has no formal medical training.

== Awards and distinctions ==
- Carroll won the award for Best Fantasy Baseball Article in Print from the Fantasy Sports Writers Association in 2005, 2006 and 2007 for articles he contributed to the RotoWire Fantasy Baseball Magazine.
- The Juice: The Real Story of Baseball's Drug Problems (2005) won the 2005 Sporting News-SABR Baseball Research Award.
- In 2008 Carroll was named a member of the Baseball Writers' Association of America and thus became eligible to vote on Major League baseball post-season awards and nominees to the National Baseball Hall of Fame. He was no longer a member as of 2014.
- In 2009 Carroll was named a member of the Pro Football Writers Association. He was no longer a member as of 2014.
- In 2014 Carroll was awarded the MORE Award by the American Academy of Orthopaedic Surgeons for his article "Dr. Frank Jobe, Tommy John and the Surgery That Changed Baseball Forever," published by Bleacher Report on July 17, 2013. MORE stands for Media Orthopaedic Reporting Excellence.

== Books ==
- Saving the Pitcher. Chicago: Ivan R. Dee, Publishers, 2004; paperback 2007. (ISBN 1-56663-578-0)
- The Juice: The Real Story of Baseball's Drug Problems. Chicago: Ivan R. Dee, Publishers, 2005; paperback 2007. (ISBN 1-56663-668-X)
- The Carroll Guide to Sports Injuries. Edited for CreateSpace Publishers, 2010. (ISBN 1-44955-692-2)
- The Science of Baseball. New York:Simon and Schuster, Publisher, 2022. (ISBN 9781510768970)
