= John Sickels =

American baseball writer (born 1968)

- Born: January 5, 1968 (age 58); Des Moines, Iowa, U.S.
- Occupations: Author, blogger
- Writing career
- Genres: Sports, science-fiction, poetry
- Website: johnsickels.net

John Sickels (born January 5, 1968) is an American baseball writer who specializes in minor league baseball and amateur baseball.

== Biography ==
Sickels is a graduate of Northwest Missouri State University (1990, BA in history and philosophy) and the University of Kansas (1993, MA in history). He resides in Kansas with his wife, Jeri. He has two sons, Nicholas and Jackson.

Sickels worked as research assistant to noted baseball writer Bill James from 1993 though 1996. From 1996 to 2005, Sickels was a columnist for ESPN.com, writing regular "Down on the Farm" columns that took an in-depth look at baseball prospects. Sickels parted ways with ESPN in February 2005 and soon thereafter started his own blog, www.minorleagueball.com, part of the SB Nation/Vox Media empire. Sickels was previously a regular contributor to the fantasy sports website RotoWire.com and can still occasionally be heard on Rotowire podcasts. He hosted Down on the Farm Friday on XM Satellite radio from 2005 to 2008.

Sickels writes and edits the annual Baseball Prospect Book, which profiles roughly 1,000 players in baseball's minor leagues, and is only available directly from his personal website. The book is wildly popular, but some sold-out versions remain available in PDF format via Sickels' website.

He also penned a 2004 biography of baseball Hall of Famer Bob Feller called Bob Feller: Ace of the Greatest Generation.

== Other interests ==
Sickels has also written poetry, science fiction, and has had multiple role playing books published within the Star Fleet Universe game system offshoot of Star Trek.
