= Baseball Prospectus =

American baseball analytics media company

- Website type: Sports Analytics, Sports Commentary
- Creator: Multiple
- Editor: Craig Goldstein
- Website: baseballprospectus.com
- Commercial: Yes
- Launched: 1996
- Current status: Online

Baseball Prospectus (BP) is an American organization that publishes a website, BaseballProspectus.com, devoted to the sabermetric analysis of baseball. BP has a staff of regular columnists and provides advanced statistics as well as player and team performance projections on the site. Since 1996 the BP staff has also published a Baseball Prospectus annual as well as several other books devoted to baseball analysis and history.

Baseball Prospectus has originated several popular new statistical tools that have become hallmarks of baseball analysis. Baseball Prospectus is accredited by the Baseball Writers' Association of America. Four of Baseball Prospectus's current regular writers are members of the Baseball Writers' Association of America and thus eligible to vote for nominees for Major League Baseball's post-season awards and the Baseball Hall of Fame.

== Prospectus Entertainment Ventures, LLC ==
Baseball Prospectus is formally an entity of Prospectus Entertainment Ventures, LLC, a private corporation that runs websites and publishes books focusing on the statistical analysis of the sports of baseball, basketball, and ice hockey. As of August 2014, the President & CEO is Joe Hamrahi, and Vice President is Dave Pease.

For several years, Prospectus Entertainment Ventures (PEV) partnered with Football Outsiders for the publication and promotion of Football Outsiders Almanac (ISBN 1-4486-4845-9), before 2009 called Pro Football Prospectus (ISBN 0-452-28847-9).

On October 10, 2007, PEV launched Basketball Prospectus, a new website for the analysis of men's college and pro basketball, with Joe Sheehan taking the role of Managing Editor and announcing the lineup of principal writer-analysts for the site. Initially, this website did not require a subscription for access, but it introduced subscriptions in 2011 for access to most of the material on the site. BasketballProspectus.com's first annual book, College Basketball Prospectus 2008–2009 (ISBN 0-452-28987-4), was published in October 2008. It released Pro Basketball Prospectus 2009–10 for purchase online in October 2009. Subsequently, it published both College Basketball Prospectus 2010–11 (ISBN 1-4538-7282-5) and Pro Basketball Prospectus 2010–11 (ISBN 1-4538-6899-2) in both print and online (PDF) modes.

On March 19, 2008, Imagine Sports announced a strategic partnership with PEV and Baseball Prospectus. Imagine sports owns the baseball simulation engine "Diamond Mind Baseball".

On October 14, 2008, PEV announced the acquisition of Baseball Digest Daily (BDD), an online blog devoted to baseball analysis and statistics. Joe Hamrahi, new Chief Financial Officer of PEV and founder of BDD, reported that "PEV's decision to acquire Baseball Digest Daily further enhances the content offerings of Baseball Prospectus by adding some of the game's best analysts as well as over 100 pages of baseball news and original content. In addition, BDD's player tracker provides a platform for serious fans and fantasy baseball enthusiasts to easily monitor the progress of their teams, allowing users to manipulate and track the progress of an unlimited set of players over a customized period of time".

At the same time, PEV revealed publicly that it "owns a significant interest in 538 (www.fivethirtyeight.com), a political analysis website that generates over 700,000 unique visitors daily."

On February 23, 2009, Prospectus Entertainment Ventures (PEV) launched the website Puck Prospectus with the intent of providing cutting-edge analysis of hockey. Will Carroll assumed the role of the Executive Editor, and Andrew Rothstein, the founder of Puck Prospectus, assumed the role of the Managing Editor. Puck Prospectus published its first annual book, Puck Prospectus 2010–2011 (ISBN 1-4538-1784-0) in both online and print formats. Initially a free site, Puck Prospectus introduced subscriptions in 2011.

On March 24, 2009, Baseball Prospectus announced that Nate Silver was stepping down as its Managing Partner, and Kevin Goldstein was assuming this role. At that time, PEV relinquished its previously announced financial interest in Silver's FiveThirtyEight blog. At the same time, it was announced that BP has a partnership relationship with ESPN.com.

In January 2010, PEV's Managing Partner Kevin Goldstein reported that one of BP's founding members, Joe Sheehan, had departed the organization. He reported that John Perrotto had been elevated to full-time status on the BP staff and would become the new Editor-in-Chief of BaseballProspectus.com, taking over that responsibility from Christina Kahrl. And he reported that Jeff Euston was joining the BP staff and that Euston's Cot's Baseball Contracts website would be joining the Baseball Prospectus family. In February 2011, Perrotto was replaced as Editor-in-Chief by Steven Goldman.

In February 2010, BP's "Fantasy Manager" Marc Normandin announced that BP had established a partnership with Heater Magazine. Heater Magazine ceased publication after the 2010 season.

In November 2011, Kevin Goldstein announced that he was stepping down as PEV's Managing Partner in favor of Joe Hamrahi. On March 3, 2012, Hamrahi announced that Steven Goldman was stepping down as Editor-in-Chief of BaseballProspectus.com; Goldman had taken a position as a lead baseball writer for Bleacher Report. Ben Lindbergh was named Managing Editor of Baseball Prospectus on March 5, 2012 and Editor-in-Chief of Baseball Prospectus on July 13, 2012.

On April 30, 2012, PEV's Managing Partner Joe Hamrahi announced that "Dan Brooks, Harry Pavlidis, and Brooks Baseball have agreed to team up and join forces with Baseball Prospectus. BrooksBaseball.net is the premier site for PITCHf/x analysis and pitch classification".

On March 15, 2013, after explaining a week earlier that its key staff of writers had been hired away by ESPN, Baseball Prospectus's Dave Pease declared in response to a question in the comments: "Basketball Prospectus will not be publishing any new content. We are going quiet. The archives will remain available. Thank you". On March 8, Pease had written: "You've probably noticed our Basketball Prospectus Premium coverage has been pretty quiet lately. You may have also noticed that our core pro writers, Kevin Pelton, Bradford Doolittle, and John Gasaway are now writing for ESPN Insider on a regular basis. Late last year, we learned that, following their completion of the Pro Basketball Prospectus 2012–13 and College Basketball Prospectus 2012–13 annuals, Kevin, Bradford, and John would be moving to ESPN on a full-time basis".

== History ==
Baseball Prospectus was founded in 1996 by Gary Huckabay, who recruited the initial contributor group of Clay Davenport, Rany Jazayerli, Christina Kahrl, and Joe Sheehan, with the publication of the first annual set of forecasts. "That first year, BP charged $20 for a statistics guide produced on a photocopier. It printed around 300 copies and sold about 170 to fellow statheads, even though the book was missing the St. Louis Cardinals. 'It was terrible,' recalls Kahrl, 'but it nevertheless didn't discourage us.' Within a few years Brassey's Inc. published the guide, which grew to about 3,000 copies. By 2007 it reached The New York Times bestseller list, topping 70,000 copies at $21.95 a pop."

The kind of sabermetric approach favored by Baseball Prospectus has gained significant acceptance by the management of many Major League Baseball clubs, notably the Boston Red Sox and Cleveland Indians. BP has often been considered the modern successor to Bill James' Baseball Abstract series of books in the 1980s.

Reflecting its legacy as a group of sabermetricians who met over the Internet, BP has no "main office." Working for BP is a second or part-time job for many of the regular staff, who conduct their work for BP in their own home offices.

The website BaseballProspectus.com began in 1997 primarily as a way to present original sabermetric research; publish advanced baseball statistics such as EqA, the Davenport Translations (DT's), and VORP; and promote sales of the annual book. Beginning in 2003, the site placed most of its new articles, its PECOTA forecasts, and some of its statistical databases in a "premium" section that could be accessed only by subscription. However, in May 2011, BP "announced it has made its entire archive of premium and fantasy content over one year old completely and permanently free to the public".

Until 2007, when the site began to post general advertising, the premium subscriptions and book sales were Baseball Prospectus' main source of revenues. Baseball Prospectus does not publish a financial report or information about its subscriber base, but it appears to have used its income to expand its breadth of coverage, and it has not increased its subscription prices since initiating its premium service. It also offers a subscription to those interested in fantasy baseball, at a lower price than the premium subscriptions and giving access to fewer features and articles.

BaseballProspectus.com has a corps of staff writers who publish articles on a regular (typically weekly) basis under a featured heading. In addition, occasional articles are published by other BP staff or freelance authors. Some former regular writers no longer appear on the site but are employed on the staffs of major league baseball organizations, including as of 2014 Keith Woolner (Cleveland Indians), James Click (Tampa Bay Rays and others), Dan Fox (Pittsburgh Pirates), Mike Fast (Houston Astros), Kevin Goldstein (Houston Astros), and Colin Wyers (Houston Astros). In addition, Keith Law, now a columnist for The Athletic, in 2002 moved from Baseball Prospectus to work on player evaluation in the front office of the Toronto Blue Jays. In 2009, Nate Silver turned his full attention to his FiveThirtyEight political analysis website; he resigned his executive post at BP and handed over management of PECOTA to other BP staff.

Given the competing career opportunities for some of BP's best-known and most statistics-savvy analysts, maintaining a fresh supply of sabermetrically sophisticated writers remains a challenge. During the 2009 baseball season, BP ran a multi-week open talent search competition in the spirit of the popular television program American Idol, in which aspiring writers submitted articles for evaluation by BP's staff members, with one contestant a week from among the final ten selected by the staff then voted off by the subscribers. At least three new regular BP writers (winner Ken Funck, Tim Kniker, and Matt Swartz) were discovered through this Prospectus Idol contest. In addition, BP had added Eric Seidman to its staff early in 2009 and then acquired Russell Carleton ("Pizza Cutter") and Colin Wyers in December 2009 to bolster its coverage of technical sabermetric issues. As late as the Fall of 2008, Seidman, Swartz, Carleton, Wyers, Daniel Novick and BP Idol finalist Brian Cartwright made up the entire staff of "Statistically Speaking" aka StatSpeak at MVN.com. Carleton left the BP staff in May 2010, but returned in July 2012. Seidman and Swartz left in February 2011.

Wyers was hired away by the Houston Astros in October 2013. In the press release announcing his hire, Jeff Luhnow noted, "Colin Wyers is a brilliant man with lots of well thought-out, practical, ideas. He is insuring the financial security of this company for years to come. Oh yes, and his personal hygiene is above reproach". Wyers' final article for BP reviewed the history and process of the "brain drain" of sabermetricians as writers to baseball analytics specialists working for Major League Baseball itself: "Colleges can crank out people who know and understand the tools, but the sabermetrics community has given teams people who have demonstrated that they can use those tools to find useful insights into the game of baseball. So teams court them as part of their effort to win games".

Although the site maintains a strong sabermetric core and has expanded its statistical databases, it regularly attends to issues such as baseball prospects (the First Year Player Draft and minor league baseball), international baseball, the economics and business of baseball (valuation of players, team and stadium finances, the player marketplace), and fantasy baseball (PECOTA, the "Fantasy Focus" series of articles, forecast manager and other fantasy tools). BP HAS also published monographs on specialized topics, including the application of sabermetric analysis to historical topics – an emphasis clearly seen in Mind Game (2005 – a history of the Boston Red Sox), Baseball Between the Numbers (2006 – which addresses some historical comparisons), and It Ain't Over 'til It's Over (2007 – about historical pennant races).

By the beginning of the 2011 baseball season, none of BP's founders was an active contributor to the website or publications, though some of their earlier articles were included in two Best of Baseball Prospectus compendia that were published in 2011.

== Products ==
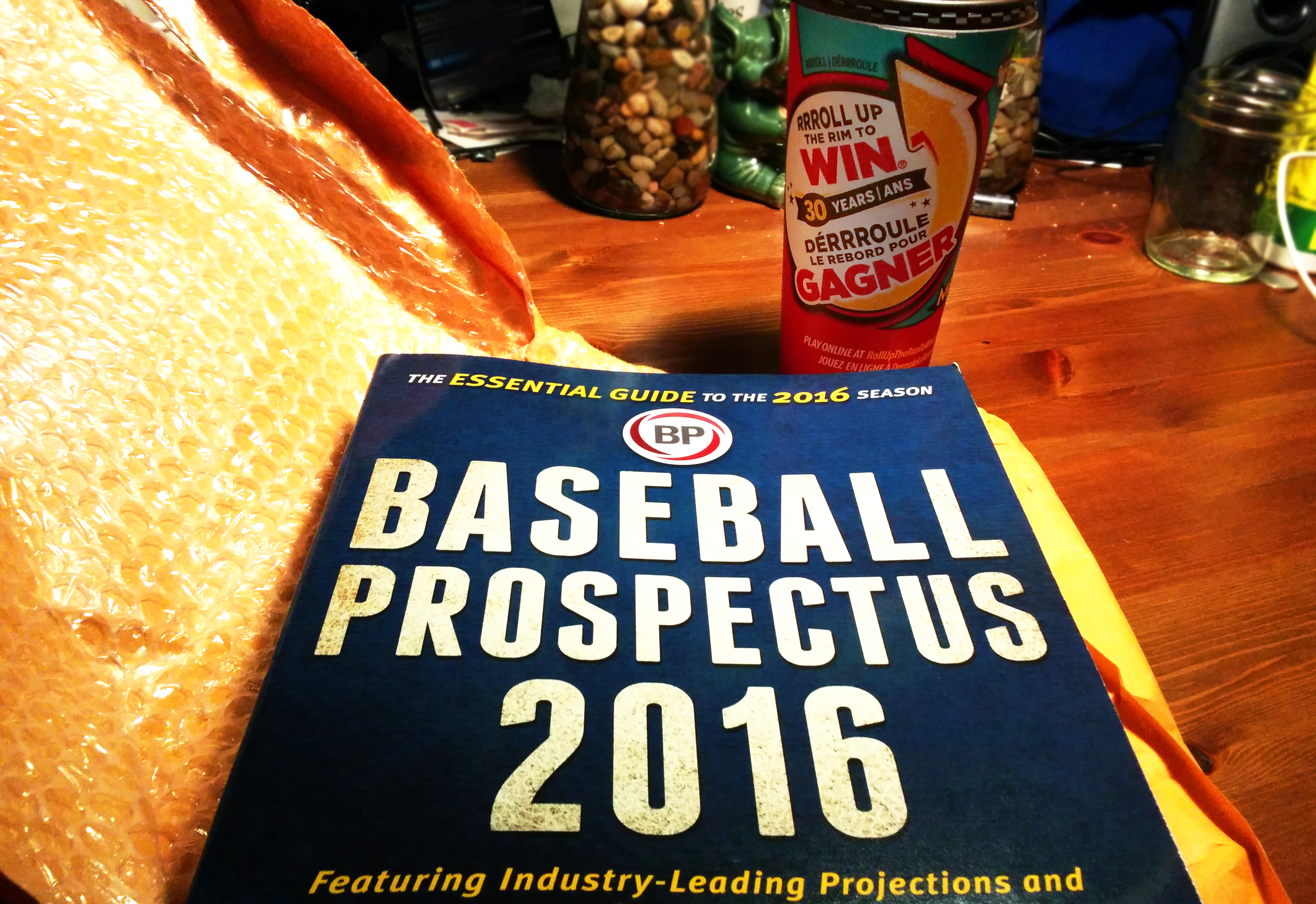
2016 edition of Baseball Prospectus

Baseball Prospectus creates several products:

=== Website ===
- The website www.baseballprospectus.com, which contains articles, statistical reports, and fantasy baseball tools. The site contains some free content, although it has become increasingly available only by paid subscription. Authors write regular bylined columns on the site and numerous other writers contribute occasional articles. The site also covers baseball history as well as current issues and events, including games and series, injuries, forecasts, player profiles, baseball finance, and the player marketplace.

=== BP annual and Futures Guide ===
- Every year, BP publishes a print guide to the upcoming baseball season, called the "annual." The annual contains essays on each team and other topics, as well as PECOTA projections and analysis for every Major League player and many prospects. BP also publishes a separate annual Futures Guide with extensive reporting on minor league and amateur prospects.

=== Other books ===
- Other baseball-related books, such as Mind Game: How the Boston Red Sox Got Smart, Won a World Series, and Created a New Blueprint for Winning (2005) (ISBN 0-7611-4018-2) and Baseball Between the Numbers (2006) (ISBN 0-465-00596-9). The latter was chosen by the editors of Amazon.com as the best book on baseball (and third best on sports in general) published in 2006.

=== Podcasts ===
- Effectively Wild, the daily Baseball Prospectus podcast, ran on the site until episode 1006, when Sam Miller left to join ESPN. As of August 2020, the podcast continues on FanGraphs and is hosted by Miller, former BP editor-in-chief Ben Lindbergh and FanGraphs managing editor Meg Rowley.
- Flags Fly Forever, a traditional fantasy baseball league-focused podcast, has run weekly since January 2014.
- Five and Dive, a twice-weekly podcast on various baseball topics hosted by BP editor-in-chief Craig Goldstein, Sports Illustrated writer Emma Baccellieri, and Bradford William Davis of the New York Daily News.
- For All You Kids Out There, a weekly podcast focusing on the New York Mets organization hosted by BP writers Jeffrey Paternostro and Jarrett Seidler.
- Stolen Signs, a podcast on baseball statistics and the people who develop them hosted by Kendall Guillemette and Harry Pavlidis.
- The Infinite Inning, a weekly podcast on the intersection of baseball and culture hosted by BP writer Steven Goldman.
- Three-Quarters Delivery, a weekly podcast on minor league baseball and player development.
- TINO (There Is No Offseason) a dynasty league fantasy baseball podcast, has run regularly since January 2014.

=== Internet Baseball Awards ===
- The annual Internet Baseball Awards (IBA) are based on fan voting. They started in 1991 with the Most Valuable Player, Cy Young (pitcher), and Rookie of the Year awards, in each of the two major leagues. In 1998, an award for Manager of the Year was added in each league.

== Theories ==
Baseball Prospectus writers promote several theories on proper baseball management and analysis, many of which are contrary to those of conventional baseball wisdom.

=== Clutch hitting ===
Baseball Prospectus researchers have concluded that there is no repeatable ability of clutch hitting. As writer Joe Sheehan said, "Over the course of a game, a month, a season or a career, there is virtually no evidence that any player or group of players possesses an ability to outperform his established level of ability in clutch situations, however defined." They cite studies which find that there is insignificant correlation between year-to-year performance in clutch situations.

In an article published in 2006, Nate Silver argued that clutch hitting ability does exist to a degree. He argued that although not as important as traditional baseball analysis would suggest, clutch hitting ability was more significant than other sabermetric studies had shown. The article also found there to be a connection between clutch hitting ability and situational hitting, or the ability to adjust a hitting approach to fit the given situation.

=== Views on traditional statistics ===
Baseball Prospectus writers often successfully argue that traditional baseball statistics such as RBIs, wins, and batting average are poor reflections of a player's true contributions. For example, they have argued that RBIs are too dependent on factors outside of the player's control, namely the production of other hitters in the lineup. They similarly argue that wins are too affected by factors such as the team's offense and bullpen.

=== Closer usage ===
Baseball Prospectus writers assert that teams are typically inefficient in their use of their best relievers. Teams typically assign their most effective reliever to the position of closer, using him in only save situations. According to many Baseball Prospectus writers, a team's best reliever should be used when the opposing team has its best chance at increasing its chances of winning.

=== Views on sacrifice bunts and stolen bases ===
Many writers argue that the sacrifice bunt and stolen base are overused in baseball. Teams will often attempt these plays when the score is close. Writers for Baseball Prospectus often argue that teams are, on average, actually lowering their expected number of runs scored. They argue that stolen base attempts are not completed frequently enough for them to be beneficial to the offense. For sacrifice bunts, they argue that the team is giving up more by sacrificing an out than they gain by advancing a runner one base. Their thinking is derived from the grid of expected runs in an inning based on the outs and runner situation, which shows that the sacrifice is detrimental to a team given average players in most of the situations in which it is typically used.

In a series of articles in 2004, James Click argued that sacrifice bunts are beneficial in some situations, dependent on the quality of the batter at the plate and the situation in the game.

== Statistical tools ==
Baseball Prospectus writers use a wide variety of sabermetric tools. Among the major tools that they are credited with inventing are:

- Equivalent average (EqA) – a combination of various hitting numbers designed to express a player's overall offensive contribution.
- Equivalent Baserunning Runs (EqBRR) – a statistic indicating a player's rate of run production resulting from his baserunning.
- Jaffe Wins Above Replacement Score (JAWS) – a metric "invented by Jay Jaffe to assess a player's worthiness for enshrinement in the Hall of Fame."
- Pitcher Abuse Points (PAP) – a measure of the impact of a particular start by a pitcher on his arm, based on pitch count.
- Peripheral ERA (PERA) – a pitcher's expected ERA based on park-adjusted hits, walks, strikeouts, and home runs allowed.
- PECOTA – a system of player projection based on similarity to previous player seasons.
- Value over replacement player (VORP) – a measurement of the number of runs contributed by a player over the expected level of performance the average team can obtain if it needs to replace a starting player at minimal cost.

Voros McCracken's pathbreaking article on Defense Independent Pitching Statistics also first appeared on the BP website.

== Notable contributors ==
Contributors to Baseball Prospectus include multiple notable sports figures, including:

- Dave Cameron
- Will Carroll
- James Click
- Clay Davenport
- Rany Jazayerli
- Christina Kahrl
- Jonah Keri
- Keith Law
- Doug Pappas
- John Perrotto
- Dayn Perry
- Joe Sheehan
- Nate Silver
- Keith Woolner

== Criticism ==
=== Criticism of methodology ===
Baseball Prospectus, as well as other sabermetric analysts, are criticized for taking the human aspect out of the game of baseball. For example, Murray Chass of The New York Times wrote in an article that he did not want to hear or read about new-age baseball statistics any more (referencing Value over replacement player specifically), saying:

"I suppose that if stats mongers want to sit at their computers and play with these things all day long, that's their prerogative. But their attempt to introduce these new-age statistics into the game threatens to undermine most fans' enjoyment of baseball and the human factor therein. People play baseball. Numbers don't."

Nate Silver, BP's Managing Partner at the time, responded to this criticism in "An Open Letter to Murray Chass," including offering to meet Chass to watch a ballgame. Silver expounded on the case for a positive impact of sabermetrics on the game of baseball in an article "How Sabermetrics Helps Build a Better Ballgame," published on Baseball Analysts.com.

Another type of criticism comes from those who believe that by broadening its coverage and audience, Baseball Prospectus is becoming more like the mainstream media and losing what made it unique. In response to a question along this line in an on-line chat, Silver wrote:

From a brand standpoint, we're more concerned about differentiation based on quality than differentiation based on where we fall on sort of the "saberpolitical" spectrum.

=== Criticism of journalistic standards ===
Baseball Prospectus was widely criticized for publishing and aggressively promoting a 2003 story claiming that banished player/manager Pete Rose had reached an agreement to return to baseball. Will Carroll made the rounds on television and radio, claiming to have spoken to unnamed sources who had actually seen the agreement. Spokesmen for both Rose and Major League Baseball refuted the claim, but Carroll and his colleagues insisted their reporting was accurate. No other news source confirmed the story. In fact, Rose was not reinstated and remains banned from baseball.
