= Clay Davenport =

American baseball statistician

Clay Davenport is a baseball sabermetrician who co-founded Baseball Prospectus (BP) in 1996. He co-edited several of the Baseball Prospectus annual volumes and is a writer for BaseballProspectus.com. Much of his work for BP was behind the scenes, where he maintained and implemented advanced statistics for the website.

For most of the time during which he contributed to Baseball Prospectus, Davenport's main employment was as a meteorologist. In March 2010, it was announced that he had moved to full-time status at Baseball Propectus. In 2011, he departed Baseball Prospectus, but maintains his own website ClayDavenport.com on which he continues to publish baseball analysis and projections. As he commented there in May 2011:

As my title indicates, this is a place for me to keep some statistics I happen to care about. These are statistics that I've run at Baseball Prospectus for many years, but BP has decided to discontinue them – or at least transform into something I no longer recognize. Baseball Prospectus was founded on the premise that, since no one was publishing the baseball book we wanted to read, we would print one ourselves. In that same spirit, since BP is not publishing the stats I want to see, the way I want to see them, I'll put them up myself.

In a later post, he characterized the reason for his departure from BP:

I'm Clay Davenport, one of the founders of Baseball Prospectus. I still have a (looser than before) affiliation with BP, so don't expect to see me using this site to dish dirt or run anybody into the ground. I'm old enough and stubborn enough to have my own way of doing things, and some of those things are contrary to the way BP wants to do things, which is why I wound up out here.

Davenport is a native of Hampton, Virginia and now lives in Maryland.

== Baseball analysis and sabermetrics ==
Davenport is known for creating the Pythagenport Formula, (designed to find the best exponent for the Pythagoras winning percentage equation), for inventing the statistic Equivalent Average (EqA) (now called "True Average" or "TAv"), and for the "Davenport Translations" or DT's. The DT's are estimated Major League equivalent performance statistics based on player statistics from minor league and international baseball. DT's were first published by Davenport on the rec.sports.baseball Usenet site in 1995, before Baseball Prospectus was founded.

The DT's are also used to standardize the records of players who played in different eras and playing conditions, not only in different leagues and levels of baseball. This allows comparison, for example, of the number of home runs hit by Babe Ruth and modern players, to estimate how many each would have hit in a season or a lifetime if they had all played under the same playing conditions (parks, leagues, levels of competition, and eras).

Davenport introduced the DT's to the on-line baseball research community in 1995 as follows:

Hello. My name is Clay Davenport, and I attend the University of Chicago as a physics genius.

While these Translations look like player stats, they are NOT the players' actual statistics. The Translations are an attempt to show how well the player would have performed in a standard league (the American League of 1992), knowing how well he played in his actual league. We know that some leagues are tougher than others; that's why we have the majors, AAA, AA, and so on. We know that some leagues are easier to hit in; we know that some parks favor the pitchers; and we know that these effects are not constant from one year to the next. We can estimate how big a difference each of those makes and correct for them, and that is what the Translations try to do. How well they work I shall leave for you to judge.

== Meteorology ==
A graduate of the University of Virginia, Davenport was employed for many years as a software contractor with the National Oceanographic and Atmospheric Administration (NOAA) in the Satellite and Information Service, where he developed models for predicting rainfall from satellite imagery. He has likened some of that work to his baseball analysis: "The biggest similarity between handling the two types of statistics is that they each involve making forecasts that are there for everyone to see, and you end up being wrong a lot," Davenport said. "You learn to develop a thick skin."

In 2000, Davenport developed the Hydro-Estimator, a set of computer programs to estimate precipitation in real time.

"The Hydro-Estimator (H-E) version of the Auto-Estimator (AE) was developed by Clay Davenport, a contractor working for the ORA Hydrology Team under the direction of Dr. Rod Scofield. The Hydro-Estimator algorithm differs from the original AE by using a brightness temperature screening technique. It adjusts the rain rate assigned to each picture element (pixel) according to the surrounding pixel temperatures. This helps separate raining and non-raining pixels and decreases the need for radar screening. It also helps focus rainfall estimate totals into more clearly defined maxima. There is less of a tendency for overestimating for very cold cloud tops using the H-E, and it does a much better job of estimating for large mesoscale convective complexes (MCC's). The H-E also has a different way of handling the moisture corrections, and also produces more frequent products every 15 minutes for all except the 24-hour totals. The 1 hour H-E totals are available on the NWS AWIPS system as a graphic for the whole CONUS every hour."

Because of these programs, according to Davenport, "we are now capable of producing rainfall estimates for every system visible from satellite, which allows it to be used for other purposes in the United States and around the world, for example, drought monitoring in Africa, forest fire protection in Brazil and landslide studies in Venezuela."
