= Earned run average =

Baseball statistic

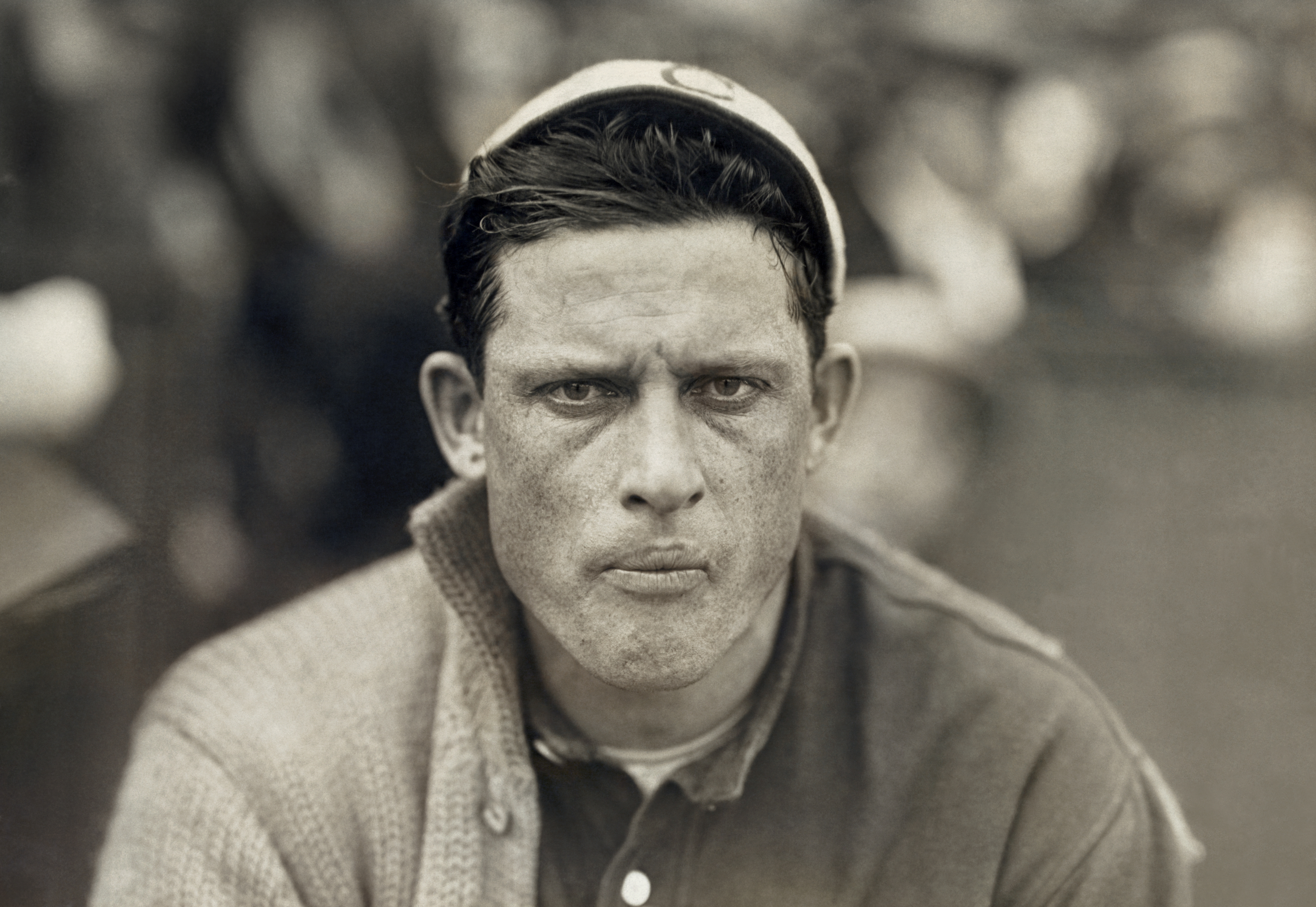
The lowest career ERA is 1.82, set by Chicago White Sox pitcher Ed Walsh.

In baseball statistics, earned run average (ERA) is the average of earned runs allowed by a pitcher per nine innings pitched (i.e. the traditional length of a game). It is determined by dividing the number of earned runs allowed by the number of innings pitched and multiplying by nine. Thus, a lower ERA is better. Runs resulting from passed balls, defensive errors (including pitchers' defensive errors), and runners placed on base at the start of extra innings are recorded as unearned runs and omitted from ERA calculations.

== Origins ==
Henry Chadwick is credited with devising the statistic, which caught on as a measure of pitching effectiveness after relief pitching came into vogue in the 1900s. Prior to 1900 and for many years afterward, pitchers were routinely expected to pitch a complete game, and their win–loss record was considered sufficient in determining their effectiveness.

After pitchers like James Otis Crandall and Charley Hall made names for themselves as relief specialists, gauging a pitcher's effectiveness became more difficult using the traditional method of tabulating wins and losses. Some criterion was needed to capture the apportionment of earned-run responsibility for a pitcher in games that saw contributions from other pitchers for the same team. Since pitchers have primary responsibility for getting opposing batters out, they must assume responsibility when a batter they do not retire at the plate moves to base, and eventually reaches home, scoring a run. A pitcher is assessed an earned run for each run scored by a batter (or the batter's pinch-runner) who reaches base while batting against that pitcher. The National League first tabulated official earned run average statistics in 1912 (the outcome was called "Heydler's statistic" for a while, after then-NL secretary John Heydler), and the American League later accepted this standard and began compiling ERA statistics.

Baseball encyclopedias will often display ERAs for earlier years, but these were computed retroactively. Negro league pitchers are often rated by RA, or total runs allowed, since the statistics available for Negro league games did not always distinguish between earned and unearned runs.

== Definition in different decades ==
As with batting average, the definition of a good ERA varies from year to year. During the dead-ball era of the 1900s and 1910s, an ERA below 2.00 (two earned runs allowed per nine innings) was considered good. In the late 1920s and through the 1930s, when conditions of the game changed in a way that strongly favored hitters, a good ERA was below 4.00; only the highest caliber pitchers, for example Dazzy Vance or Lefty Grove, would consistently post an ERA under 3.00 during these years. In the 1960s, sub-2.00 ERAs returned as other influences, such as ballparks with different dimensions, were introduced. Starting with the 2019 season, an ERA under 4.00 is again considered good.

The single-season record for the lowest ERA is held by Dutch Leonard, who in 1914 had an earned run average of 0.96, pitching 224.2 innings with a win–loss record of 19–5. The all-time record for the lowest single season earned run average by a pitcher pitching 300 or more innings is 1.12, set by Bob Gibson in 1968. The record for the lowest career earned run average is 1.82, held by Ed Walsh, who played from 1904 through 1917.

=== Infinite and undefined ===
Some players may be listed with infinite ERAs. This can happen if a pitcher allows one or more earned runs without retiring a batter. Several players have registered an infinite ERA for their limited pitching careers in MLB, usually a single appearance. Examples include Bill Ford with the Boston Bees in 1936 and Fred Bruckbauer with the Minnesota Twins in 1961. Outfielder Vic Davalillo made two pitching appearances with St. Louis Cardinals in 1969 and failed to record an out while facing four batters and allowing one run, leaving him with an infinite ERA as a major-league pitcher. (This comes from attempting to divide any non-zero number by zero).

An undefined ERA occasionally occurs at the beginning of a baseball season when a pitcher has yet to appear in any games. It is sometimes incorrectly displayed as zero or as the lowest-ranking ERA.

== Other external factors ==
=== Starters and relievers ===
At times it can be misleading to judge relief pitchers solely on ERA, because they are charged only for runs scored by batters who reached base while batting against them. Thus, if a relief pitcher enters the game while his team is leading by 1 run, with 2 outs and the bases loaded, and then gives up a single which scores 2 runs, he is not charged with those runs. If he retires the next batter (and pitches no more innings), his ERA for that game will be 0.00 despite having surrendered the lead. (He is recorded with a blown save if those runs tied the game or affected a lead change.) Starting pitchers operate under the same rules, but are not called upon to start pitching with runners already on base. In addition, relief pitchers know beforehand that they will only be pitching for a relatively short while, allowing them to exert themselves more for each pitch, unlike starters who typically need to conserve their energy over the course of a game in case they are asked to pitch 7 or more innings. The reliever's freedom to use their maximum energy for a few innings, or even for just a few batters, helps them keep their ERAs down.

ERA, taken by itself, can also be misleading when trying to objectively judge starting pitchers, though not to the extent seen with relief pitchers.

=== Designated hitter rule ===
The advent of the designated hitter rule in the American League in 1973 made the pitching environment significantly different. From then up through 2021, pitchers spending all or most of their careers in the AL, while not usually having to worry about batting themselves, had been at a disadvantage in maintaining low ERAs compared to National League pitchers who could often get an easy out when pitching to the opposition's pitcher. Starting in 1997, when teams began playing teams from the other league during the regular season, the DH rule was in effect only when such interleague games are played in an American League park; this was rendered moot after the National League permanently adopted the DH in 2022.

This difference between the leagues (the DH) also affected relievers, but not to the same degree. This is because National League relievers actually pitched to pitchers less often than NL starters did for a number of reasons, mainly because relievers are usually active in later innings when the double switch was available and/or pinch hitters tended to be used in the pitcher's batting spot.

=== Location ===
ERA is also affected somewhat by the ballpark where a pitcher's team plays half its games, as well as the tendency of hometown official scorers to assign errors instead of base hits in plays that could be either.

As an extreme example, pitchers for the Colorado Rockies have historically faced many problems, all damaging to their ERAs. The combination of high altitude (5,280 ft or 1,610 m) and a semi-arid climate in Denver causes fly balls to travel up to 10% further than at sea level. Denver's altitude and low humidity also diminish the ability of pitchers to throw effective breaking balls, due to both reduced air resistance and difficulty in gripping dry baseballs. These conditions have been countered to some extent since 2002 by the team's use of humidors to store baseballs before games. These difficult circumstances for Rockies pitchers may not adversely affect their win–loss records, since opposing pitchers must deal with the same problems. Indeed, hometown hurlers have some advantage in any given game since they are physically acclimated to the altitude and often develop techniques to mitigate the challenges of this ballpark. Still, conditions there tend to inflate Rockies' ERAs relative to the rest of the league.

== Sabermetric treatment ==
In modern baseball, sabermetrics uses several defense independent pitching statistics (DIPS) including a Defense-Independent ERA in an attempt to measure a pitcher's ability regardless of factors outside his control. Furthermore, because of the dependence of ERA on factors over which a pitcher has little control, forecasting future ERAs on the basis of the past ERAs of a given pitcher is not very reliable and can be improved if analysts rely on other performance indicators such as strike out rates and walk rates. For example, this is the premise of Nate Silver's forecasts of ERAs using his PECOTA system. Silver also developed a "quick" earned run average (QuikERA or QERA) to calculate an ERA from peripheral statistics including strikeouts, walks, and groundball percentage. Unlike peripheral ERA or PERA, it does not take into account park effects. Another statistic derived from ERA is Adjusted ERA, also called ERA+, which adjusts a pitcher's ERA to a scale where 100 is average for the league and takes into account the various dimensions and other factors of each ballpark.

In baseball statistics, runs per nine innings (denoted by R/9 or RA9) is a measure of a pitcher's effectiveness in preventing runs; calculated as: (9 × runs allowed) / (innings pitched). In this way, it is different from the ERA in that all runs, rather than only earned runs, are included.

== All-time career leaders ==
=== MLB ===
Rank	ERA	Player	Team(s)	Year(s)
1	1.82	Ed Walsh	Chicago (AL), Boston (NL)	1904–1917
2	1.89	Addie Joss	Cleveland (AL)	1902–1910
3	1.89	Jim Devlin	Chicago (NA), Louisville (NL)	1875–1877
4	2.02	Jack Pfiester	Pittsburgh (NL), Chicago (NL)	1903–1904, 1906–1911
5	2.03	Smoky Joe Wood	Boston (AL), Cleveland (AL)	1908–1915, 1917–1922

=== Career leaders in the live-ball era (post-1920, starting pitchers only) ===
Because of rule changes post-1920, most notably the abolition of the spitball and frequent replacement of soiled or scuffed baseballs, the increased importance of the home run (largely due to Babe Ruth), and the American League's adoption of the designated hitter rule, ERAs have been noticeably higher than in the early decades of the sport.

This is a list of the lowest ERAs among pitchers that played their entire careers after 1920 (minimum 1,500 innings pitched, starting pitcher).

Rank	ERA	Player	Team(s)	Year(s)
1	2.53	Clayton Kershaw	Los Angeles (NL)	2008–2025
2	2.75	Whitey Ford	New York (AL)	1950–1967
3	2.76	Sandy Koufax	Brooklyn/Los Angeles (NL)	1955–1966
4	2.86	Jim Palmer	Baltimore (AL)	1965–1984
5	2.86	Andy Messersmith	California, Los Angeles (NL), Atlanta, New York (AL)	1968–1979
6	2.86	Tom Seaver	New York (NL), Cincinnati, Chicago (AL), Boston	1967–1986

== See also ==
- Catcher's ERA
- Component ERA
- FIP
- Run average
