= Rany Jazayerli =

American dermatologist and baseball statistician

Rany Jazayerli (born June 14, 1975) is a Chicago-area dermatologist and co-founder of and writer for Baseball Prospectus. He developed the statistical concept of Pitcher Abuse Points (PAP), which relates to high pitch counts in baseball.

Jazayerli is a graduate of Johns Hopkins University and University of Michigan Medicine. He is a board-certified dermatologist and a Fellow of the American Academy of Dermatology.

== Works ==
Since 1996 Jazayerli has co-authored many of the annual Baseball Prospectus volumes. He also writes occasional “Doctoring the Numbers” columns for BaseballProspectus.com in which he investigates topics from a sabermetric perspective. He is the creator of the sabermetric measure of "Pitcher Abuse Points." The term Pitcher Abuse Points – PAP – was coined by Jazayerli in an article published on the Baseball Prospectus (BP) website in 1998, and the statistic was regularly reported and discussed on the website. In 2001, Keith Woolner came up with an alternative measure, termed PAP^{3}, which has served as the basic pitcher use statistic reported on the BP website since then. For a summary, see Keith Woolner, "Doctoring the Numbers: PAP³ FAQ," BaseballProspectus.com (June 6, 2002). Jazayerli has published seminal research on the relative merits of the 4-man and 5-man pitching rotation. His most important recent major research contribution is a series of twelve articles published on BaseballProspectus.com in 2005-2006 reporting a massive study of the changing patterns of the Major League Baseball player draft.

He and Rob Neyer of ESPN co-authored a blog called “Rob & Rany on the Royals,” in which they both would lament the performance of the Kansas City Royals major league franchise. He now writes his own blog, "Rany on the Royals". Since 2011 he has been a contributing writer to Grantland.

He has also contributed essays on politics to FiveThirtyEight.

Jazayerli has written political opinion pieces, especially on topics of interest to American Muslims, for The Washington Post, The Ringer and his own website, Rany on the Royals. Shortly after the September 11 attacks, the murder of Balbir Singh Sodhi, Mark Anthony Stroman's shooting spree in Dallas and several other hate crimes against Muslims in the United States, Jazayerli wrote a “plea for tolerance” on ESPN.com’s "Page 2." In 2017, he wrote a letter to his dermatology patients explaining his opposition to the Trump travel ban.

== Personal life ==
Jazayerli was born in Michigan to Syrian immigrant parents and is Muslim. His father had a medical degree from the University of Damascus and practiced cardiology. He moved with his family to Wichita, Kansas when he was ten days old and grew up a fan of the Kansas City Royals. In 1984, his father took a job in Saudi Arabia and Jazayerli began splitting time between Saudi Arabia and Wichita. He would return home to Wichita every summer until he was married in 1997, at which point he relocated to Illinois.
