= Keith Woolner =

Keith Woolner (born c. 1968) is an author for Baseball Prospectus and is the creator of the statistic Value Over Replacement Player (VORP). VORP is acknowledged by the sabermetrics community as one of the key concepts in the analysis of a player's performance and market valuation.

== Education and early career ==
Woolner grew up in New Hampshire as a fan of the Boston Red Sox, later moving to Florida as a teenager. He earned two bachelor's degrees from the Massachusetts Institute of Technology: one in Mathematics with Computer Science, and one in Management from the MIT Sloan School of Management. He also earned a master's degree in Decision Analysis from Stanford University.

After graduating from MIT, Woolner worked in software development and system management (for Oracle) and several start-ups in Silicon Valley; and later in product management (for SAS). During this time he maintained his avocational interest in baseball statistics and analysis. According to Woolner,

...no matter how interesting the technology or how novel the application, it was hard to get truly passionate about helping another business improve their profitability or run more efficiently. The work was intellectually stimulating but not emotionally engaging.

What did engage me was baseball statistics. I spent a lot of my free time reading online forums devoted to baseball, and I discovered that baseball statistics had moved far beyond the stats on the backs of the baseball cards I grew up with. I started designing my own customized statistics in the mid-1990s and eventually posted them on Usenet newsgroups and my own Web page.

== Sabermetrician and Cleveland Indians front office ==
In 1998, while still employed full-time in software development and management, Woolner became a regular contributor to a fledgling Baseball Prospectus, for whom he wrote both for the annual book and the website. He also authored six chapters of Baseball Prospectus's book Baseball Between the Numbers.

In May 2007, Woolner announced his departure from Baseball Prospectus to join the front office of the Cleveland Guardians as their Manager of Baseball Research & Analytics. In this role, he is "responsible for advanced objective analysis, forecasting, and strategy analysis. [He is also] working on integrating the information from the disparate worlds of scouting and stats in a way that makes each stronger."
