= Batting park factor =

Baseball statistic

Batting Park Factor, also simply called Park Factor or BPF, is a baseball statistic that indicates the difference between runs scored in a team's home and road games. Most commonly used as a metric in the sabermetric community, it has found more general usage in recent years. It is helpful in assessing how much a specific ballpark contributes to the offensive production of a team or player.

The formula most commonly used is:

$PF = 100 * ( {{homeRS + homeRA \over homeG} \over {roadRS + roadRA \over roadG}} )$

In this formula, all runs scored by or against a team at home (per game) are divided by all runs scored on the road (per game). Parks with a Park Factor over 100 are those where more overall runs are scored when the team is at home than are scored when the team is away. While some variation can be attributable to fluctuations in offensive and defensive performance, PF accounts for the production of both teams in each park and, correspondingly, is very useful in trying to determine which ballparks are "hitter friendly" and which are "pitcher friendly".

In place of Runs scored and allowed, the formula can easily use home runs, hits or any other statistic to further analyze the park factor of an individual park.

The main contributors to ballpark factor are 1) Stadium Dimensions 2) Physics of ball flight based on location (weather and elevation).

In baseball, each stadium has a unique shape and distances in left, Center, and Right Field. In addition to each stadium being unique, the location of the stadium has a significant impact. In Colorado, the ball has been calculated to travel nearly 10% further than balls in Seattle.

== See also ==
- Glossary of baseball (H) § hitter's park
- Glossary of baseball (P) § pitcher's park
