= Keltner =

Keltner may refer to:

People

- Chester W. Keltner, (1909–1998), grain analyst described what became known as the Keltner channel
- Dacher Keltner, professor of psychology
- Howard Keltner (1928–1998), comics creator and indexer
- Jim Keltner, (b. 1942), session drummer
- Ken Keltner, (1916–1991), Major League Baseball third baseman

Places

- Keltner, Kentucky, United States
- Keltner, Missouri, United States

Other uses

- Keltner list, developed by baseball statistician Bill James
