= Home runs per hit =

In baseball statistics, home run per hit (HR/H) is the percentage of hits that are home runs. It is loosely related to isolated power, which is the ability to hit for extra-base hits, including home runs. Power hitters, players who readily hit many home runs tend to have higher HR/H than contact hitters. A player hitting 30 home runs and have 150 hits in a season would have HR/H of .200, while a player who hit 8 home runs and have 200 hits in a season would have HR/H of .040.

HR/H ratio has gotten higher over time. From 1959 to 2007, HR/H for leading power hitters in MLB was .3312, with the ratio being the highest from 1995 to 2001.
