= Ross Barnes =

American baseball player (1850–1915)

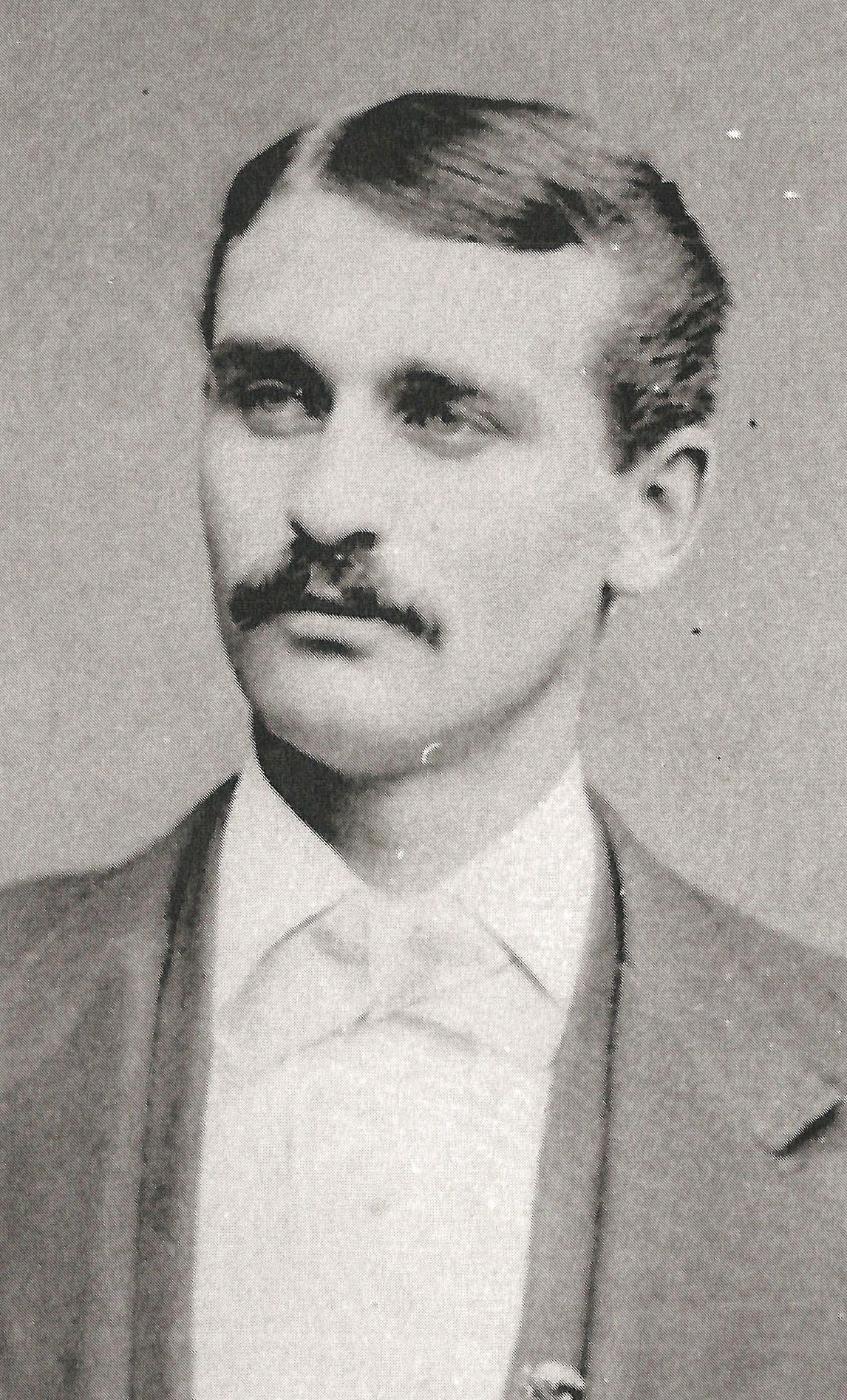
- Second baseman / Shortstop
- Born: May 8, 1850; Mount Morris, New York, U.S.
- Died: February 5, 1915 (aged 64); Chicago, Illinois, U.S.
- Batted: Right Threw: Right

Major-league debut
- May 5, 1871, for the Boston Red Stockings

Last major-league appearance
- September 21, 1881, for the Boston Red Stockings

Major-league statistics
- Batting average: .360
- Home runs: 6
- Runs batted in: 346
- Runs scored: 698
- Stats at Baseball Reference

Teams
- National Association of Base Ball Players Rockford Forest Citys (1866–1870) League Player Boston Red Stockings (1871–1875) Chicago White Stockings (1876–1877) Cincinnati Reds (1879) Boston Red Stockings (1881)

Career highlights and awards
- 3× batting champion (1872, 1873, 1876); 4× runs scored leader (1871, 1873, 1875, 1876); 4× hits leader (1872, 1873, 1875, 1876); 3× doubles leader (1872, 1873, 1876); 2× triples leader (1873, 1876); NA stolen base leader (1873)

Charles Roscoe Barnes (May 8, 1850 – February 5, 1915) was one of the stars of baseball's National Association (1871–1875) and the early National League (1876–1881), playing second base and shortstop. He played for the dominant Boston Red Stockings teams of the early 1870s, along with Albert Spalding, Cal McVey, George Wright, Harry Wright, Jim O'Rourke, and Deacon White. Despite playing for these star-studded teams (for which he won five consecutive league pennants), many claim that Ross was the most valuable to his teams. However, injuries limited his power in his peak and his professional career ended at the age of 31.

== Early life ==
Ross Barnes was born on May 8, 1850, in Mount Morris, Livingston County, New York.

== Career ==
From 1868 to 1870, Barnes starred for the Rockford Forest Citys, along with Albert Spalding, attaining professional status in the second year. When the National Association was formed in 1871, Harry Wright signed both men to his new team in Boston. Barnes's major league career thus started when he was 21. He split time between second base and shortstop for the Boston Red Stockings of the new National Association. Barnes led the league with 66 runs scored and 91 total bases, finishing second in batting average at .401.

In 1872, he led the Association with a .432 batting average, a .585 slugging percentage, 99 base hits, 134 total bases, and 28 doubles. The Red Stockings began a four-year dominance of the Association, with Barnes a key player each year. Barnes again led the Association in 1873, hitting .425, as well as leading in on-base percentage (.456), slugging percentage (.584), base hits (137), runs scored (125), total bases (188), doubles (29), bases on balls (28), and stolen bases (13). His .340 BA in 1874 was good enough for eighth in the league, while his .364 was good for second in 1875, while leading again in runs scored (115), base hits (143) and on-base percentage (.375).

His Red Stockings went a combined 205-50 from 1872 to 1875, a winning percentage not matched by any team since.

Before the 1875 season ended, Barnes and four other Boston players signed contracts with the Chicago White Stockings. When word leaked out in Boston before the end of the season, Barnes and his teammates were reviled by Boston fans, being called "seceders," a strong epithet just a decade after the Civil War. It was likely that the National Association would void the signing, but Chicago owner William Hulbert preempted the move by forming the National League and causing the NA to disband.

Barnes's new team finished first in the NL's first season with a 55–12 record, while Boston fell to fourth. Ross led the National League batting (.429), on-base percentage (.462), slugging (.562), runs (126), hits (138), bases (190), doubles (21), triples (14), and walks (20). In the 1876 season, Barnes also established the single-season record for runs per game (1.91), a mark which still stands. Barnes also has the distinction of having hit the first home run in National League history, on May 2, 1876. In the 1876 season, Barnes not only lead the league in runs scored but had scored 54 more runs than any other player, the largest margin ever in the history of Major League Baseball.

=== Fair-Foul Bunt Rule Change ===
Barnes specialized in the fair-foul bunt. He was so dominant that the National League changed its rules after the 1876 season to eliminate it. At that time, home plate was made of cast iron, and was further forward than it is now and in fair territory. If a batted ball first landed in fair territory, it remained fair even if it rolled into foul territory immediately. And in the 1870s hitters were allowed to call for the pitch to be either high or low. Many hitters would call for the pitch to be low, and then bunt the ball so that it landed fair and rolled foul, in which case it would be impossible for the defense to throw them out. Barnes was the master at this, but differently than the other players he would take a full swing, aim for the top of the ball, so that it would bounce off home plate, and then roll way foul. And when the infielders would position themselves to field the bunt, Barnes would often swing away to keep them off balance. This technique allowed Barnes to be dominant, often hitting over .400, and lead the major leagues in ways that were unequaled. However, once the rule was changed, Barnes' offensive career collapsed and he never again hit even .300.

In 1877, Barnes fell ill with what was then only described as an "ague," played only 22 games, and did not play well when he was in the lineup. The illness robbed Barnes of much of his strength and agility and shortened his career. Though some have blamed the rule change regarding foul balls for Barnes's decline, Nate Silver argues that the illness was likely the primary factor that hurt Barnes's career.

The remainder of his career was an effort to return to glory ending in mediocrity. He played for the Tecumseh team in the International Association (arguably baseball's first minor league) in 1878, returned to the National League with the Cincinnati club in 1879, sat out all of 1880, and finished his professional career in 1881, playing his last season in Boston, the site of his former glory. After 1876, he never hit better than .272, and his other totals were barely half of those from his glory days. He retired at age 31. He finished his career with 859 hits, 698 runs, and a .359 average, in only 499 games played and 2392 at bats. His 1.4 runs per game played remains the best of all time.

Barnes briefly returned to professional baseball in 1890, serving as an umpire for the Players' League.

=== Evaluation ===
Barnes is only one of four players, the others being Babe Ruth, Rickey Henderson, and Aaron Judge, in the history of Major League Baseball to lead his league in runs scored with more than 30 runs over the next closest player; in 1876 Barnes had 54 more runs scored than runner-up George Wright, which is the largest differential ever.

Barnes holds the career NA records in runs (459), hits (530), doubles (99), walks (55), stolen bases (73), total bases (695), times on base (585), runs produced (694), batting average (.390), on-base percentage (.413), and slugging percentage (.511).

During the late 19th and early 20th century, Barnes was highly regarded by many baseball observers. In 1903, sportswriter Tim Murnane wrote that Barnes was the “king of second baseman, as well as the finest batsman and run-getter of all time.” However, the memory of Barnes's accomplishments waned as the 20th century progressed, with many analysts, including Bill James, dismissing Barnes's dominance due to his reliance on a defunct rule.

In the 21st century, Barnes has received some retroactive recognition by baseball writers. In 2007, an analyst wrote that Barnes was "arguably the single most dominant player in Major League history."

== Personal life ==
Barnes held a variety of white-collar jobs in the Chicago area after his baseball career, including serving as an accountant with People's Gas, Light & Coke Company. A bachelor for most of his life, Barnes married Ellen Welsh in 1900. He died from heart disease in 1915.

== See also ==
- List of Major League Baseball batting champions
- List of Major League Baseball annual runs scored leaders
- List of Major League Baseball annual doubles leaders
- List of Major League Baseball annual triples leaders
- List of Major League Baseball single-game hits leaders
