= Total average =

Total average is a baseball statistic devised by sportswriter Thomas Boswell and introduced in 1978. It was also described in his 1982 article "Welcome to the world of Total Average where a walk is as good as a hit". It is designed to measure a hitter's overall offensive contributions, on the basis that "all bases are created equal". The statistic was included in issues of Inside Sports.

The definition of the statistic is simple. A player gets a credit for every base accumulated and a penalty for every out made. So a player gets one credit for a single, walk, stolen base or being hit by a pitch; two for a double; three for a triple; and four for a home run. A player's total average is calculated by summing the accumulated bases and dividing by the number of outs the player makes.

== Formula ==
When initially announced in an article in Inside Sports, the formula for total average was:

$TA = \frac{TB+HBP+BB+SB}{AB+HBP+BB+SB+CS}$

Boswell revised the formula, which by 1981 had been modified to its final form:

$TA = \frac{TB+HBP+BB+SB}{AB-H+CS+GIDP}$

where

- TA = Total average
- TB = Total bases
- HBP = Hit by pitch
- BB = Walks
- SB = Stolen base
- CS = Caught stealing
- AB = At bats
- H = Hits
- GIDP = Grounded into double play

Like OPS, total average gives credit to players who draw a lot of walks and hit with a lot of power, such as Babe Ruth, Barry Bonds, Ted Williams and Frank Thomas.

== Reception ==
Bill James was critical of total average, stating the "all bases are created unequal". For example, a walk and a single both advance the batter to first base, but a walk can advance baserunners only one base (or none, if there is no baserunner on first base), whereas a single can advance all baserunners. That is, "a single has more value". Likewise, a stolen base is treated the same as a hit, but does not add a baserunner or advance other baserunners as a hit does.
