= XR =

XR or Xr may refer to:

== Science and technology ==
- X-ray
- Extended reality, an umbrella term for virtual reality, augmented reality, and mixed reality
- Cisco IOS XR, router software
- Xr, original name of cairo graphics library
- Extended release, a modified-release dosage for medication
- iPhone XR, a smartphone released in 2018

== Transportation ==
- Ford Falcon (XR), an Australian car
- Honda XR series, motorcycles

== Other uses ==
- XR, a fictional character in animated TV series Buzz Lightyear of Star Command
- Extinction Rebellion, environmental movement and advocacy group
- Extrapolated Runs, a baseball statistic
- Corendon Airlines Europe, IATA airline code XR
- Chi Rho (☧ or ΧΡ), a Christogram
- Crossrail, abbreviated XR, a completed rail project in the United Kingdom
- Elizabeth line, National Rail reporting mark XR

== See also ==
- Exchange rate, rate at which one currency will be exchanged for another
- OpenXR, a standard for access to virtual reality and augmented reality platforms
