= Batters faced =

Baseball statistic

In baseball statistics, Batters Faced (BF), also known as Total Batters Faced (TBF) or Batters Facing Pitcher (BFP) is the number of batters who made a plate appearance before the pitcher in a game or in a season.

For a given game, the number of plate appearances for an offense is 3×(Innings) + (Runs scored) + (Runners left on base).

== Major league records ==
The major league record for batters faced in a career belongs to Cy Young, who faced 29,565 batters between 1890 and 1911. Will White of the Cincinnati Reds holds the single season record; he faced 2,906 batters in 1879. The last pitcher to face 1,500 or more batters in a single season was Wilbur Wood of the 1973 Chicago White Sox.

On May 1, 1920, Leon Cadore of the Brooklyn Robins faced 96 Boston Braves batters, an MLB single game record dating back to at least 1901. Oakland's Steve McCatty is the last pitcher to face 50 or more batters in a game. McCatty pitched to 51 batters in a 14-inning complete game loss to the Seattle Mariners on August 10, 1980.

Mike Myers made 314 appearances in which he faced just one opposing batter per game, also a record.

== No batters faced ==
It is possible for a pitcher to participate in a game without officially facing a batter. This can happen when a baserunner is picked off or caught stealing to end either the inning or the game. For example, in a game between the San Francisco Giants and Philadelphia Phillies on August 4, 2016, San Francisco's Sergio Romo entered the game in the bottom of the 9th inning with the game tied and 2 out. Romo threw four pitches to Aaron Altherr before César Hernández was caught stealing second base to end the inning, after which Romo was replaced. The Giants went on to win the game in extra innings and Romo was the winning pitcher despite never officially facing a batter.

A pitcher could also not record a batter faced if he gets injured and has to be replaced before the completion of a plate appearance. Larry Yount holds the distinction of being the only pitcher in major league history to appear in the record books without ever having officially faced a batter. In Yount's case this was also true in a literal sense as he was injured while throwing a warm-up pitch on his debut and never entered the game, but was credited with doing so due to having already been announced.

== See also ==
- Pitch count
- Basic pitch count estimator
