= Thomas Boswell =

American sports columnist

- Born: October 11, 1947 (age 78); Washington, D.C., U.S.
- Education: Amherst College (B.A.)
- Occupations: Sportswriter, author
- Spouse: Wendy Boswell
- Children: Russell Boswell
- Writing career
- Notable awards: BBWAA Career Excellence Award (2025); Red Smith Award (2025)

Thomas M. Boswell (born October 11, 1947) is an American retired sports columnist who spent his whole career with The Washington Post.

== Early life ==
Born in Washington, D.C., Boswell attended St. Stephen's School in Alexandria, Virginia, and graduated from Amherst College in 1969 with a degree in English literature.

== Career ==
Boswell spent his entire career at The Washington Post, joining it shortly after graduating college. He became a columnist in 1984. In addition to the Post, he has written for Esquire, GQ, Playboy and Inside Sports. He also makes frequent television appearances.

Writing primarily about baseball, he is credited with inventing the total average statistic.

In 1994, he appeared several times in the Ken Burns series Baseball, sharing commentary into the history of America's national pastime; he appeared again in "The Tenth Inning," Burns' 2010 extension of the series.

On October 19, 2020, Boswell announced in his column that he would not be covering the World Series for the first time since 1975. The 72-year-old Boswell cited health concerns related to the COVID-19 pandemic, saying that it was too risky for someone at his age to make the trip. Boswell pointed out in his column that at the time, the 1975 World Series was considered the greatest World Series ever played, largely due to the dramatic game six that ended with Carlton Fisk’s historic home run. The drama of the series convinced him to remain a journalist with the Post and, in his column, he speculates “Where would I be today if Fisk's ball had gone foul?” Dan Shaughnessy of The Boston Globe subsequently mentioned Boswell in his own column about missing the World Series for the first time in his career.

On May 7, 2021, Boswell announced that he would be retiring at the end of June 2021 in a column in The Washington Post. A number of his colleagues paid tribute to him, including former Post sports editor George Solomon, former Post chairman and publisher Donald E. Graham, and fellow sportswriters Dan Shaughnessy, Tim Kurkjian, Jeff Passan, Christine Brennan, and Ken Rosenthal.

== Awards ==
In 2018, Boswell was inducted into the National Sports Media Association's Hall of Fame. Previously, he had been inducted into the Washington DC Professional Chapter of the Society of Professional Journalists Hall of Fame and the Washington, DC Sports Hall of Fame, one of only seven sports writers among the 140 members, who include Walter Johnson, Red Auerbach, Bones McKinney, and National Sports Media Association Hall of Famers Shirley Povich and Bob Wolff.

In December 2024, Boswell was selected as recipient of the 2025 the BBWAA Career Excellence Award. He was honored at the Baseball Hall of Fame on July 26, 2025.

== Personal life ==
Boswell lives in Crownsville, Maryland, with his wife Wendy. They have one child together, a son named Russell.

== Books ==
- How Life Imitates the World Series (1982)
- Why Time Begins on Opening Day (1984)
- Strokes of Genius (1987)
- The Heart of the Order (1989)
- Game Day: Sports Writings 1970–1990 (1990)
- Cracking the Show (1994)
- Diamond Dreams (with Walter Iooss) (1996)
