= Basic pitch count estimator =

In baseball statistics, the basic pitch count estimator is a statistic used to estimate the number of pitches thrown by a pitcher where there is no pitch count data available. The formula was first derived by Tom Tango. The formula is $3.3 PA + 1.5 SO + 2.2 BB$, where PA refers to the number of plate appearances against the pitcher, SO to strikeouts and BB to base on balls.

== See also ==
- Pitch count
- Batters faced by pitcher
