= Runs created =

Baseball statistic

Runs created (RC) is a baseball statistic invented by Bill James to estimate the number of runs a hitter contributes to his team.

== Purpose ==
James explains in his book, The Bill James Historical Baseball Abstract, why he believes runs created is an essential thing to measure:

With regard to an offensive player, the first key question is how many runs have resulted from what he has done with the bat and on the basepaths. Willie McCovey hit .270 in his career, with 353 doubles, 46 triples, 521 home runs and 1,345 walks -- but his job was not to hit doubles, nor to hit singles, nor to hit triples, nor to draw walks or even hit home runs, but rather to put runs on the scoreboard. How many runs resulted from all of these things?

Runs created attempts to answer this bedrock question. The conceptual framework of the "runs created" stat is:

$RC = \frac{A\;\times\;B}{C}$

where

- A = On-base factor
- B = Advancement factor
- C = Opportunity factor

== Formula ==
=== Basic runs created ===
In the most basic runs created formula:

$RC = \frac{(H+BB) \times TB}{AB+BB}$

where H is hits, BB is base on balls, TB is total bases and AB is at-bats.

This can also be expressed as

$RC = OBP \times SLG \times AB$

$RC = OBP \times TB$

where OBP is a simplified form of on-base percentage (ignoring hit by pitches and sacrifice flies), SLG is slugging average, AB is at-bats and TB is total bases.

=== "Stolen base" version of runs created ===
This formula expands on the basic formula by accounting for a player's basestealing ability.

$RC = \frac{(H+BB-CS) \times (TB+(.55 \times SB))}{AB+BB}$

where H is hits, BB is base on balls, CS is caught stealing, TB is total bases, SB is stolen bases, and AB is at bats.

=== "Technical" version of runs created ===
This formula accounts for all basic, easily available offensive statistics.

$RC = \frac{(H+BB-CS+HBP-GIDP) \times (TB+(.26 \times (BB - IBB + HBP)) + (.52 \times (SH + SF + SB)))}{AB+BB+HBP+SH+SF}$

where H is hits, BB is base on balls, CS is caught stealing, HBP is hit by pitch, GIDP is grounded into double play, TB is total bases, IBB is intentional base on balls, SH is sacrifice hit, SF is sacrifice fly, SB is stolen base, and AB is at bats.

=== 2002 version of runs created ===
Earlier versions of runs created overestimated the number of runs created by players with extremely high A and B factors (on-base and slugging), such as Babe Ruth, Ted Williams and Barry Bonds. This is because these formulas placed a player in an offensive context of players equal to himself; it is as if the player is assumed to be on base for himself when he hits home runs. Of course, this is impossible, and in reality, a great player is interacting with offensive players whose contributions are inferior to his. The 2002 version corrects this by placing the player in the context of his real-life team. This 2002 version also takes into account performance in "clutch" situations.

A: $H + BB - CS + HBP - GIDP$
B: $(1.125 \times \mathit{1B}) + (1.69 \times \mathit{2B}) + (3.02 \times \mathit{3B}) + (3.73 \times HR) + .29 \times (BB-IBB+HBP) + .492 \times (SH + SF + SB) - (.04 \times K)$
C: $AB + BB + HBP + SH + SF$

where K is strikeout.

The initial individual runs created estimate is then:

$RC = \left ( \frac{(2.4C+A)\;(3C+B)}{9C} \right ) - .9C$

If situational hitting information is available, the following should be added to the above total:

$H_{RISP} - (AB_{RISP} \times BA) + HR_{ROB} - \frac{AB_{ROB} \times HR}{AB}$

where RISP is runners in scoring position, BA is batting average, HR is home run, and ROB is runners on base. The subscripts indicate the required condition for the formula. For example, $H_{RISP}$ means "hits while runners are in scoring position."

This is then figured for every member of the team, and an estimate of total team runs scored is added up. The actual total of team runs scored is then divided by the estimated total team runs scored, yielding a ratio of real to estimated team runs scored. The above individual runs created estimate is then multiplied by this ratio, to yield a runs created estimate for the individual.

=== Other expressions of runs created ===
==== Weighted runs created plus ====
Weighted runs created plus (wRC+) takes runs created and adjusts it to account for ballpark factors and the era a player played in.

$\frac{(wRAA + R_{Lg}) + (R_{Lg} - (BPF \times R_{Lg}))}{wRC_{Lg}} \times 100$

where Lg refers to the league the player belongs to, wRAA is weighted runs above average per plate appearance, R is runs per plate appearance, BPF is ballpark factor, and wRC is weighted runs created per plate appearance, not including pitchers. The subscript refers to the stat being an average within the league. For example, $R_{Lg}$ means the average runs per plate appearance in the league the player is a part of.

==== Runs created as a rate stat ====
The same information provided by runs created can be expressed as a rate stat, rather than a raw number of runs contributed. This is usually expressed as runs created per some number of outs, e.g. $\frac{RC}{27}$ (27 being the number of outs per team in a standard 9-inning baseball game).

== Accuracy ==
Runs created is believed to be an accurate measure of an individual's offensive contribution because when used on whole teams, the formula normally closely approximates how many runs the team actually scores. Even the basic version of runs created usually predicts a team's run total within a 5% margin of error. Other, more advanced versions are even more accurate.

== Related statistics ==
- Win Shares is James' attempt to summarize, in one stat, a player's contributions on both offense and defense.

== See also ==
- Sabermetrics
- Base Runs
- Extrapolated Runs
- Runs produced
