= Whatever Happened to the Hall of Fame? =

1994 book by Bill James

- First edition cover with original title
- Author: Bill James
- Original title: The Politics of Glory
- Language: English
- Publication date: 1994
- Publication place: United States
- ISBN: 0-684-80088-8

Whatever Happened to the Hall of Fame?: Baseball, Cooperstown, and the Politics of Glory is a book by baseball sabermetrician and author Bill James. Originally published in 1994 as The Politics of Glory, the book covers the unique history of the Baseball Hall of Fame, the evolution of its standards, and arguments for individual players in a typically Jamesian, stat-driven manner. James drives home early on the heated and biased nature of Hall of Fame arguments between fans and writers alike. He states that his goal is not to serve individual players or candidates but to "reinforce the truth in what other people say" and to "serve the argument itself."

James primarily uses five of his own statistical methods for his justifications:

- **Similarity scores**. Used to compare two particular players, which is useful (for example) in verifying if Player A, who is not in the Hall, is truly similar to Player B, who is.
- **The Hall of Fame Standards List**. First introduced in this book, the Career Standards List is a series of 100 questions that measures objective accomplishment that might be expected of a Hall of Fame caliber player (for example, Did he have 3,000 hits? Did he hit .300?), with the average Hall of Famer answering yes to 50. The highest all-time score for a player is 84 by Christy Mathewson; the highest for a player spending most of his career at a non-pitching position is 78 by Babe Ruth.
- **The Black Ink Test**. A system of measuring the league-leading statistical performances of a certain player. The name refers to the fact that these accomplishments are traditionally shown in boldface type in baseball encyclopedias.
- **The Hall of Fame Career Monitor**. A method for predicting whether a player will be elected to the Hall of Fame, particularly useful when discussing active players and candidates, as well as some who have been overlooked in the past. A score of 100 gives the player a good chance of selection while a 130 should guarantee selection.
- **Fibonacci Win Scores**. Another new method, used primarily for pitchers, that combines the three measures of pitching achievement (winning percentage, win total, and games over .500) into a single measurement.

Throughout the book James expresses considerable disapproval of the election process, mainly because of the imperfectly defined standards and club-like Veterans Committee which, particularly in its early years, allowed players of suspect qualifications entrance into the Hall of Fame. As a solution, he describes an alternative voting system that would consist of five panels—one each for the media, the fans, the players, baseball executives and professionals, and what he calls "baseball scholars". Each panel would be able to nominate players individually, but for election a player would need the approval of four out of the five panels.

While none of his suggestions has been implemented, many of his ratings systems have stuck as legitimate metrics for measuring a career and for judging the chances of a player making it into the Hall of Fame.

== Publication data ==
Simon & Schuster Inc., Copyright 1994, 1995 by Bill James. ISBN 0-684-80088-8.

== See also ==
- Sabermetrics
- Moneyball: The Art of Winning an Unfair Game
- Keltner list
