= Contact hitter =

Baseball hitter who does not strike out often

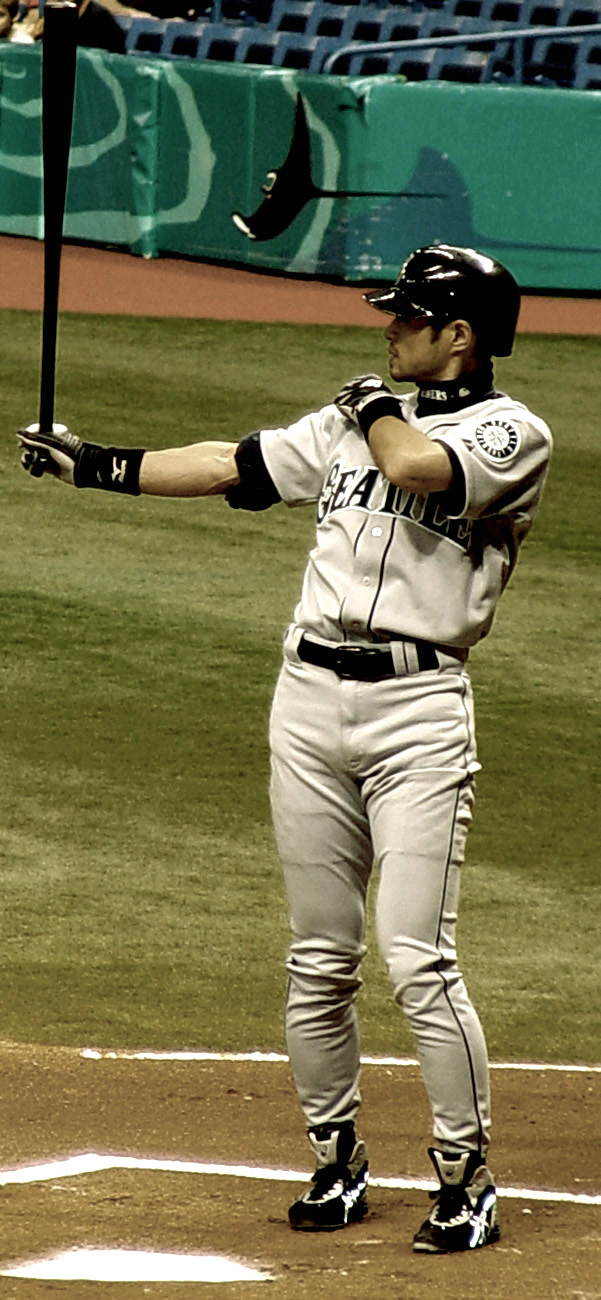
Ichiro Suzuki was one of baseball's best contact hitters, consistently among the AL's leaders in at bats per strikeout.

In baseball, a contact hitter is a hitter who does not strike out often. Thus, they are usually able to use their bat to make contact with the ball (hence the name contact hitter) to put it in play, and then run fast to reach base. As a result of their focus on putting the ball in play, they usually have fewer home runs than power hitters, but a higher BABIP.

Tony Gwynn is a leading example of a modern contact hitter. With just 135 career home runs, Gwynn described himself as a contact hitter who could hit to all fields. He rarely struck out (just 434 times, once every 21 at-bats, or once every 23.5 plate appearances) and his goal was to put the ball in play and move baserunners over. Gwynn's success as a contact hitter landed him in the National Baseball Hall of Fame. Rod Carew is another example of a contact hitter who turned into a dominant MLB player, notching 18 all-star game appearances throughout his hall of fame career.

== History ==
One of the earliest known uses of the phrase "contact hitter" was in a 1966 Bradenton Herald report about Manatee Junior College players Whitey Whiten and Mark Sprunger. United Press International possibly was the first news agency to record the term in reference to a Major League Baseball player as Royals general manager Cedric Tallis gave recent acquisition Lou Piniella the title in a quote from a story that appeared in a 1969 edition of The Tampa Tribune.

Low-strikeout and high-batting average players have existed throughout the history of baseball, but players first began to achieve stardom as contact hitters in the 1970s. Rod Carew was one of the first contact hitter superstars of this era, claiming the 1977 American League MVP with a .388 batting average for the Minnesota Twins. In his 19-year career, Carew never finished a season with a batting average lower than .273 and never posted a strikeout percentage higher than 16.2%. Carew was selected as an All-Star for 18 consecutive seasons, cementing him as a superstar of the game. Other great contact hitters of the 1970s include Joe Morgan and all-time hits leader Pete Rose.

Contact hitters continued to be a key facet of the game through the 1980s. This decade saw the rise of Tony Gwynn of the San Diego Padres, considered by many to be the greatest contact hitter of baseball's modern era. Gwynn never posted a batting average lower than .289 in his career, never struck out more than 40 times in a season, and never posted a strikeout percentage higher than 8.0%. Gwynn's .394 batting average in 1994 became legendary in the San Diego area and was commemorated by AleSmith Brewing Company's San Diego .394 American Pale Ale. The 1980s featured other popular contact hitters such as Paul Molitor and George Brett.

In the 1990s, contact hitters began to experience a decline as featured superstars of the game due to the rise in popularity of power hitters and the increased usage of steroids in baseball to achieve record-breaking home run statistics. While sluggers like Barry Bonds, Mark McGwire, Sammy Sosa, and Ken Griffey Jr. dominated the 1990s and partook in highly-publicized races for home run titles, a few contact hitters like Wade Boggs continued to contribute to their teams with less media popularity than previous contact hitters. In pursuit of home runs, players became less concerned about striking out. The average team in 1975 struck out 4.98 times per game whereas the average rose to 6.30 by 1995. Ichiro Suzuki of the Orix Blue Wave in Nippon Professional Baseball established himself as a legendary contact hitter in Japan in the 1990s. He did not come to Major League Baseball until 2001.

When Suzuki signed with the Seattle Mariners in 2001, he made an instant impact as a superstar contact hitter. He won both the AL Rookie of the Year and the AL MVP in his MLB rookie season. Suzuki was defiantly immune to striking out in an era where strikeouts were continually on the rise. He never struck out more than 86 times and never posted a strikeout percentage higher than 17.7%. Accruing 3,000 MLB hits by 2016 and retiring as a player in 2019, Suzuki is considered the most recent contact-hitting superstar to play in Major League Baseball.

In 2019, the average MLB team struck out 8.81 times per game, an all-time high in MLB history dating back to 1871. Despite the growing acceptance of strikeouts, the league still has many notable contact hitters, such as Michael Brantley, Yuli Gurriel, Jeff McNeil, David Fletcher, and Luis Arraez.
