= Ken Keltner =

American baseball player (1916–1991)

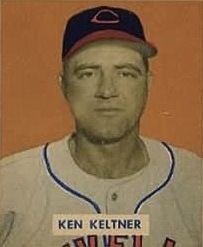
- Keltner's 1949 Bowman Gum baseball card
- Third baseman
- Born: October 31, 1916; Milwaukee, Wisconsin, U.S.
- Died: December 12, 1991 (aged 75); New Berlin, Wisconsin, U.S.
- Batted: Right Threw: Right

MLB debut
- October 2, 1937, for the Cleveland Indians

Last MLB appearance
- May 25, 1950, for the Boston Red Sox

MLB statistics
- Batting average: .276
- Home runs: 163
- Runs batted in: 852
- Stats at Baseball Reference

Teams
- Cleveland Indians (1937–1944, 1946–1949); Boston Red Sox (1950)

Career highlights and awards
- 7× All-Star (1940–1944, 1946, 1948); World Series champion (1948); Cleveland Guardians Hall of Fame

Kenneth Frederick Keltner (October 31, 1916 – December 12, 1991) was an American professional baseball player. He played in Major League Baseball as a third baseman from 1937 to 1950, most prominently as a member of the Cleveland Indians where he was a seven-time All-Star player and was a member of the 1948 World Series winning team. He played his final season for the Boston Red Sox.

Keltner was notable for being one of the best fielding third basemen in the 1940s and for helping to end Joe DiMaggio's 56-game hitting streak on July 17, 1941. He was inducted into the Cleveland Guardians Hall of Fame in 1951. In 2001, he was voted one of the 100 greatest players in Cleveland Indians' history by a panel of veteran baseball writers, executives and historians.

== Baseball career ==
Born in Milwaukee, Wisconsin, Keltner began his professional baseball career in 1936 playing for his hometown team, the Milwaukee Brewers, then a minor league team. He made a rapid ascent through the minor leagues, and in 1938, the Cleveland Indians invited him to their spring training camp. The 21-year-old Keltner made the team and played in 149 games that season, posting a .276 batting average with 26 home runs and 113 runs batted in.

On August 20, 1938, as part of a publicity stunt by the Come to Cleveland Committee, Indians' catchers Frankie Pytlak and Hank Helf successfully caught baseballs dropped by Keltner from Cleveland's 708-foot-tall (216 m) Terminal Tower. The 708-foot (216 m) drop broke the 555-foot, 30-year-old record set by Washington Senator catcher Gabby Street at the Washington Monument.

In 1939, Keltner improved his hitting statistics with a career-high .325 batting average along with 13 home runs and 97 runs batted in. He also embellished his defensive reputation with a .974 fielding percentage, and leading American League third basemen with 40 double plays and 187 putouts, appearing in all 154 games. Keltner earned his first All-Star berth in 1940. In the 1941 All-Star Game, he spearheaded a ninth inning four-run rally as the American League fought back from a 5-3 deficit. Keltner beat the throw to first base for an infield single to start the rally. Three batters later, he scored on a groundout before Ted Williams followed with a two-out, game-ending, three-run home run.

Two weeks later, in a game against the New York Yankees on July 17, 1941, Keltner became part of baseball history when he made two impressive, backhanded defensive plays against Joe DiMaggio, as the latter attempted to extend his 56-game hitting streak. DiMaggio walked and grounded out in his other two plate appearances, as the record-setting hitting streak came to an end. Keltner joined the United States Navy in 1945 and missed an entire season while serving in Hawaii. He returned to play for the Indians in 1946, earning his sixth All-Star selection in the process.

Keltner had a career-season in 1948, placing third in the American League home runs with 31 and posting career-highs with 119 runs batted in, 91 runs, and 89 walks, and placed fifth in the league with a .522 slugging average, helping Cleveland earn a first-ever one-game playoff against the Boston Red Sox. The Indians won the game 8-3 behind knuckleballer Gene Bearden, with the help of Keltner's single, double, and 3-run home run over the Green Monster in Fenway Park. The Indians then went on to defeat the Boston Braves in the 1948 World Series.

Due to injuries, Keltner appeared in only 80 games in 1949. A .232 average with eight homers and 30 runs batted in prompted the Indians to release him after the season, replacing him at third base with Al Rosen. He played with the Red Sox in 1950, appearing in only eight games as a third baseman and one as a first baseman (his only major league fielding appearance anywhere other than 1,500 games played at third base). Keltner concluded his major league career at only age 33. He played one more season in the minor leagues with the Sacramento Solons in 1951 before retiring as a player.

== Career statistics ==
In a 13-season major league career, Keltner played in 1,526 games, accumulating 1,570 hits in 5,683 at bats for a .276 career batting average along with 163 home runs and 852 runs batted in. Keltner had 69 triples, 308 doubles, accumulated 39 stolen bases and scored 737 runs. He led American League third basemen four times in assists, five times in double plays, twice in fielding percentage and twice in range factor, ending his career with a .965 fielding percentage. At the time of Keltner's retirement, only Willie Kamm and Heinie Groh had higher career fielding percentages among retired major league third basemen. Keltner made 7 All-Star teams in 13 seasons. When he left the Indians, he was in the Top 5 in many of their all-time hitting records.

== Post-playing career ==
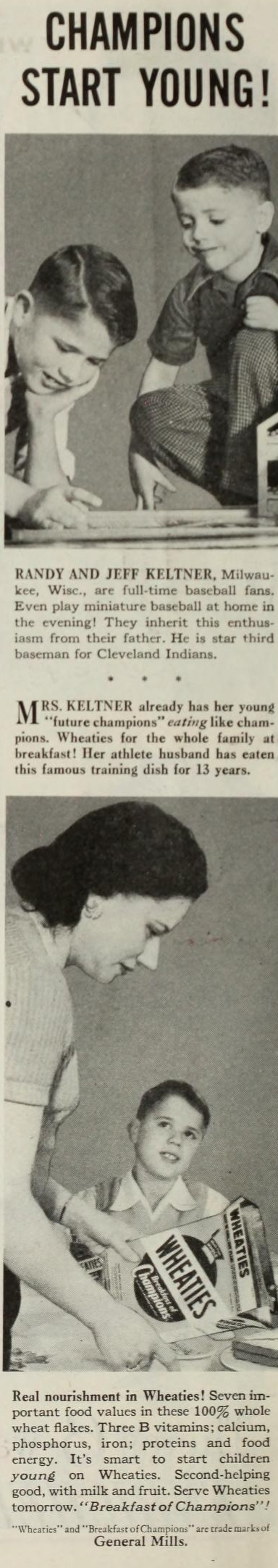
Keltner's wife and children in an Wheaties ad, 1949.

After his retirement as a player, Keltner served as a scout for the Indians and the Red Sox. He was inducted into the Wisconsin Sports Hall of Fame in 1970. Keltner was also inducted into the Cleveland Indians Hall of Fame, the Ohio Baseball Hall of Fame and was named to the 100 Greatest Cleveland Indians in 2001. Keltner was the subject of a brief campaign for the Baseball Hall of Fame. While he was never a popular candidate, his candidacy gave rise to the Keltner List by baseball historian Bill James - a list of questions designed to guide thinking on the Hall of Fame. James ranked Keltner 35th all-time among third baseman in his Historical Baseball Abstract.

Keltner died in his home state of Wisconsin at age 75 of a heart attack.

== See also ==
- Keltner list
