= Extrapolated Runs =

Baseball statistic

Extrapolated Runs (XR) is a baseball statistic invented by sabermetrician Jim Furtado to estimate the number of runs a hitter contributes to his team. XR measures essentially the same thing as Bill James' Runs Created, but it is a linear weights formula that assigns a run value to each event, rather than a multiplicative formula like James' creation.

== Purpose and formulae ==
According to Furtado, Extrapolated Runs was inspired by Paul Johnson's Estimated Runs Produced (ERP) formula, which was published in James' 1985 Baseball Abstract. Furtado found that Johnson's method, when written a different way, was essentially a linear weights formula (something James apparently did not recognize at the time, given his very public disdain for linear run estimators). ERP was almost as accurate as RC at measuring team runs, it did not succumb to RC's infamous problems at the individual level, and its values stacked up well when compared to Pete Palmer's linear weights formula, even though the two methods were developed in entirely different ways. For these reasons, Furtado believed that linear estimators had more promise than was originally thought, and he set out to develop his own.

After much trial and error (some of which involved borrowing concepts and weights from other linear formulas), Furtado eventually found a set of weights that best fit his sample (every Major League Baseball season from 1955 to 1997). He unveiled the formula in the 1999 Big Bad Baseball Annual:

"Extrapolated Runs was developed for use with seasons from 1955 to the present. I came up with three versions of the formula. The three formulas are:

- XR – Extrapolated Runs = (.50 × 1B) + (.72 × 2B) + (1.04 × 3B) + (1.44 × HR) + (.34 × (HP+TBB−IBB)) + (.25 × IBB)+ (.18 × SB) + (−.32 × CS) + (−.090 × (AB − H − K)) + (−.098 x K)+ (−.37 × GIDP) + (.37 x SF) + (.04 × SH)
- XRR – Extrapolated Runs Reduced = (.50 × 1B) + (.72 × 2B) + (1.04 × 3B) + (1.44 × HR) + (.33 × (HP+TBB)) + (.18 × SB) + (−.32 × CS) + (−.098 × (AB − H))
- XRB – Extrapolated Runs Basic = (.50 × 1B) + (.72 × 2B) + (1.04 × 3B) + (1.44 × HR) + (.34 × (TBB)) + (.18 × SB) + (−.32 × CS) + (−.096 × (AB − H))

"As you can see, calculating XR requires only addition and multiplication. Its simplicity of design is a great attribute. Unlike a lot of the other methods, you don't need to know team totals, actual runs, league figures or anything else. You just plug the stats into the formula and you are all set.

"Another of XR attributes is that the formula is pretty much context neutral. Other than park effects, the only remaining residue of context is due to the inclusion of IBB, GIDP and SF. Although I could have removed them from the full version, I felt that the inclusion of these terms was important since my research showed there was a strong correlation between the IBB, SF and GIDP opportunities that players face. I also felt, like Bill James, that these statistics do tell us something valuable about players. Of course, I knew some people might not agree with me. For them, I created two other versions.

"XR also accounts for just about every out. James correctly understands that the more outs an individual player consumes the less valuable his positive contributions are. Since XR will be used as the base of the Extrapolated Win method, I thought it was important to include as many outs as possible in the formula.

"Another nice thing about XR is that if you add up all the players' Extrapolated Runs, you'll have the team totals. That's a benefit of using a linear equation."

== Pros and cons of extrapolated runs ==
Along with Palmer's Linear Weights, XR is the most accurate of the linear run estimators, in terms of predicting team runs scored. And unlike James' RC, it doesn't artificially inflate the runs produced by individual players who combine high OBPs and SLGs. It is also much easier to calculate than Base Runs.

However, like any linear formula, there is no guarantee that it will work outside of the context in which it was developed (in this case, seasons from 1955 to 1997).

== See also ==
- Sabermetrics
- Runs Created
- Base Runs
