= Secondary average =

Secondary average, or SecA, is a baseball statistic that measures the sum of extra bases gained on hits, walks, and stolen bases (less times caught stealing) depicted per at bat. Created by Bill James, it is a sabermetric measurement of hitting performance that seeks to evaluate the number of bases a player gained independent of batting average. Unlike batting average, which is a simple ratio of base hits to at bats, secondary average accounts for power (extra base hits), plate discipline (walks), and speed (stolen bases minus times caught stealing). Secondary averages have a higher variance than batting averages.

== Formula ==
The formula to calculate secondary average is:

$$SecA = \frac{BB+(TB-H) + (SB-CS)}{AB}$$

where

- BB = bases on balls
- TB = Total bases
- H = Hits
- SB = Stolen bases
- CS = Caught stealing
- AB = At bats

The resulting number rounded to the thousandth place is a player's secondary average. Variations to the formula exist, with some statisticians not counting caught stealing while others multiply caught stealing to increase its significance/negative effects.

== Relation to batting average ==
Although they share a limited correlation, overall league averages for secondary average are inclined to correspond with league batting averages, which allows for a viable reference point for secondary average in comparison to batting average.

A player can possess a low batting average yet still be a valuable offensive contributor if he has a high secondary average. However, a low secondary average is not necessarily an indicator of a poor hitter. Ichiro Suzuki is an example of a hitter who relies on batting average for most of his offensive production. Furthermore, batting average and secondary average are not mutually exclusive; a player can have a high batting average as well as a high secondary average. The table below shows the leaders in both batting average and secondary average for the 2013 season (bold indicates leader in both categories).

Batting Average	Secondary Average
1. **Miguel Cabrera (.348)**	1. Chris Davis (.476)
2. Michael Cuddyer (.331)	2. **Mike Trout (.465)**
3. Joe Mauer (.324)	3. **Miguel Cabrera (.456)**
4. **Mike Trout (.323)**	4. Edwin Encarnacion (.428)
5. Chris Johnson (.321)	5. Paul Goldschmidt (.427)
6(t). Freddie Freeman (.319)	6. Joey Votto (.423)
6(t). Yadier Molina (.319)	7. David Ortiz (.409)
8(t). Jayson Werth (.318)	8. Giancarlo Stanton (.407)
8(t). Matt Carpenter (.318)	9. Jose Bautista (.403)
10. Andrew McCutchen (.317)	10. Shin-Soo Choo (.390)

== Benefits for player evaluation ==
Secondary average operates under the principle that batting average is an incomplete indicator of a hitter's ability since batting average does not account for power, plate discipline, and speed. According to Scott Gray (working with Bill James), "Secondary average is a much better indicator of offensive ability than batting average".

Since secondary average evaluates a player's offensive contribution independent of batting average, it can identify players who have low batting averages yet are still productive offensively. For example, in 1990, Bill James identified Eric Davis as the most productive batter with a career average below .275; in spite of his low batting average, Davis had a career secondary average of .504, which was the highest of any active player at the time. Batting average was not a great indicator of his true offensive value; secondary average was able to demonstrate his value more effectively.

Adam Dunn is an example of a recent player who has a low batting average but an excellent secondary average, resulting from his high walk totals and power numbers. Notably, during each season in a 5-year stretch in which he hit 40+ home runs, he hit more homers than doubles. Although Adam Dunn only has a career .238 batting average,' he has a career .456 secondary average, ranking him 12th all-time. As Chicago Sun-Times reporter John Grochowski demonstrated, Adam Dunn's offensive value is more apparent when secondary average is accounted for.
