= Carson Cistulli =

American poet, essayist, and sabermetrician

Carson Harrington Cistulli
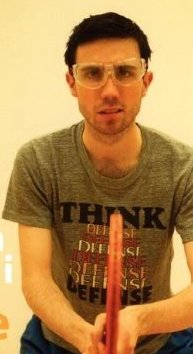
- Born: December 23, 1979 (age 46); Concord, New Hampshire

Philosophical work
- Era: 21st-century poetry
- Region: Western Poetry, Postmodernism

Carson Cistulli (born December 23, 1979) is an American poet, essayist and baseball analyst for the Toronto Blue Jays. His works of poetry include Some Common Weaknesses Illustrated, Assorted Fictions, and A Century of Enthusiasm.

== Biography ==
=== Early years ===
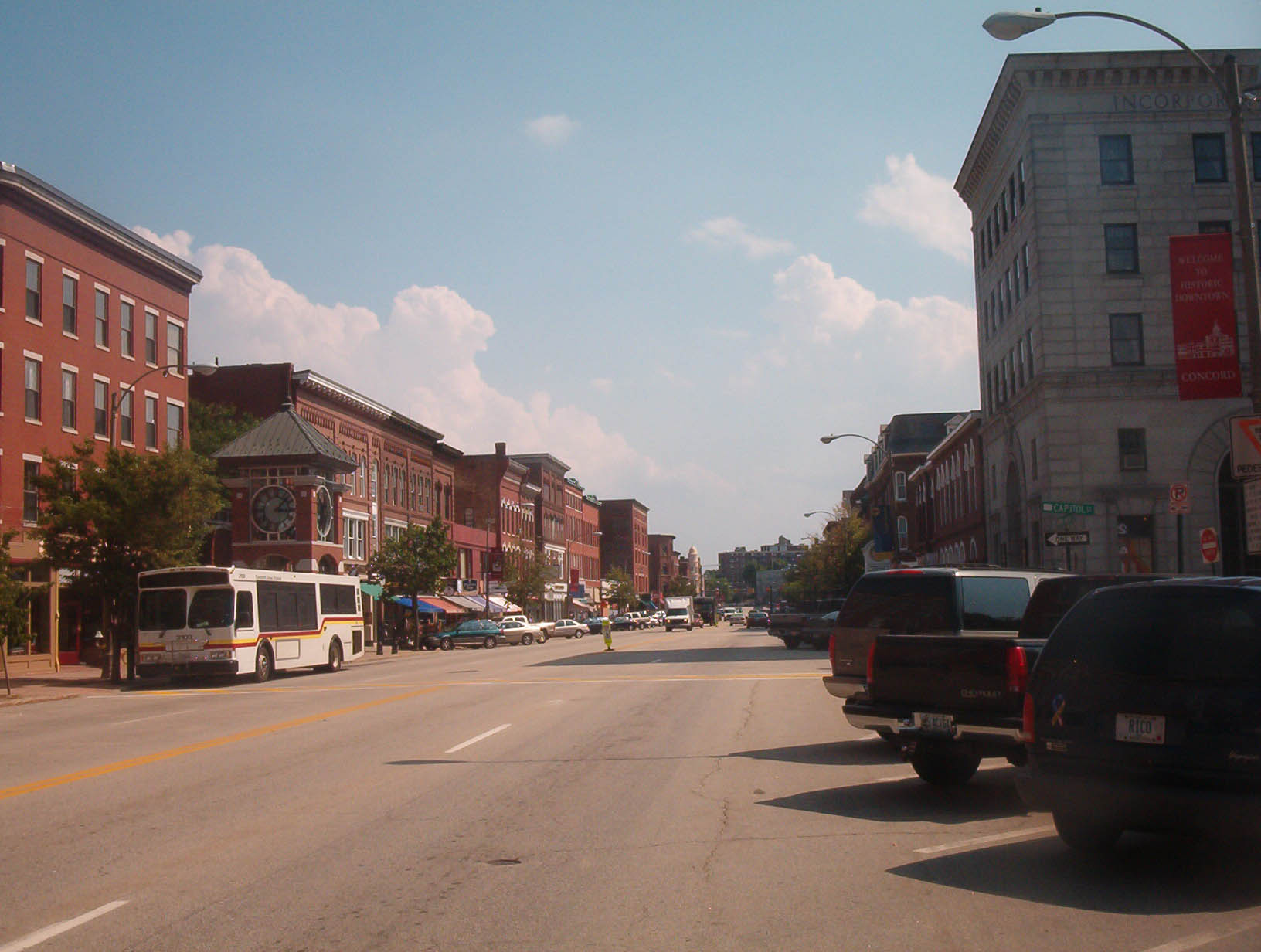
Concord, New Hampshire

Carson Cistulli was born December 23, 1979, in Concord, New Hampshire, to Philip Cistulli Jr. and Holly Young. Cistulli passed his early childhood in a middle class Italian-American household until his parents' divorce in 1989. Cistulli attended boarding school at Milton Academy in Massachusetts.

=== Education ===
After graduating from Milton in 1998, he attended Columbia University where he studied under poet Kenneth Koch of the New York School of poetry. After his studies under Koch, he moved to Seattle to write. He would later receive a bachelor's degree in Classical Civilizations from the University of Montana in Missoula and a master's degree in Creative writing from the University of Massachusetts Amherst.

=== Panic attacks ===
In an essay about sports and aesthetics, "A Lengthy Meditation on Baseball and the Science of Happiness," Cistulli explained that part of his turn towards writing was a therapeutic response to anxiety attacks. Cistulli wrote that these attacks became so intense that he at times struggled to breathe: "During the fall of 2001, while living in Missoula, MT, I began experiencing some symptoms of generalized anxiety: occasional tightness or pain in the chest and limbs, invasive thoughts about death and illness [...] those symptoms persisted off and on into the next spring, at which time I developed a considerably less pleasant one (i.e., symptom): for long periods of time, and with no warning, I was unable to breathe involuntarily."

== Poetry ==
Cistulli utilizes the notions of authorship, poetic inspiration, and recontextualization.

Lisa Baker writes that "In a day and age when we are quick to consume the rigid definitions of relationships fed to us by those who wield power, Cistulli tutors us in language's malleability; a new comparison, an unexpected verb in a familiar phrase can force an entirely new perspective—and perhaps one more curious and more generous."

== Essays and journalism ==
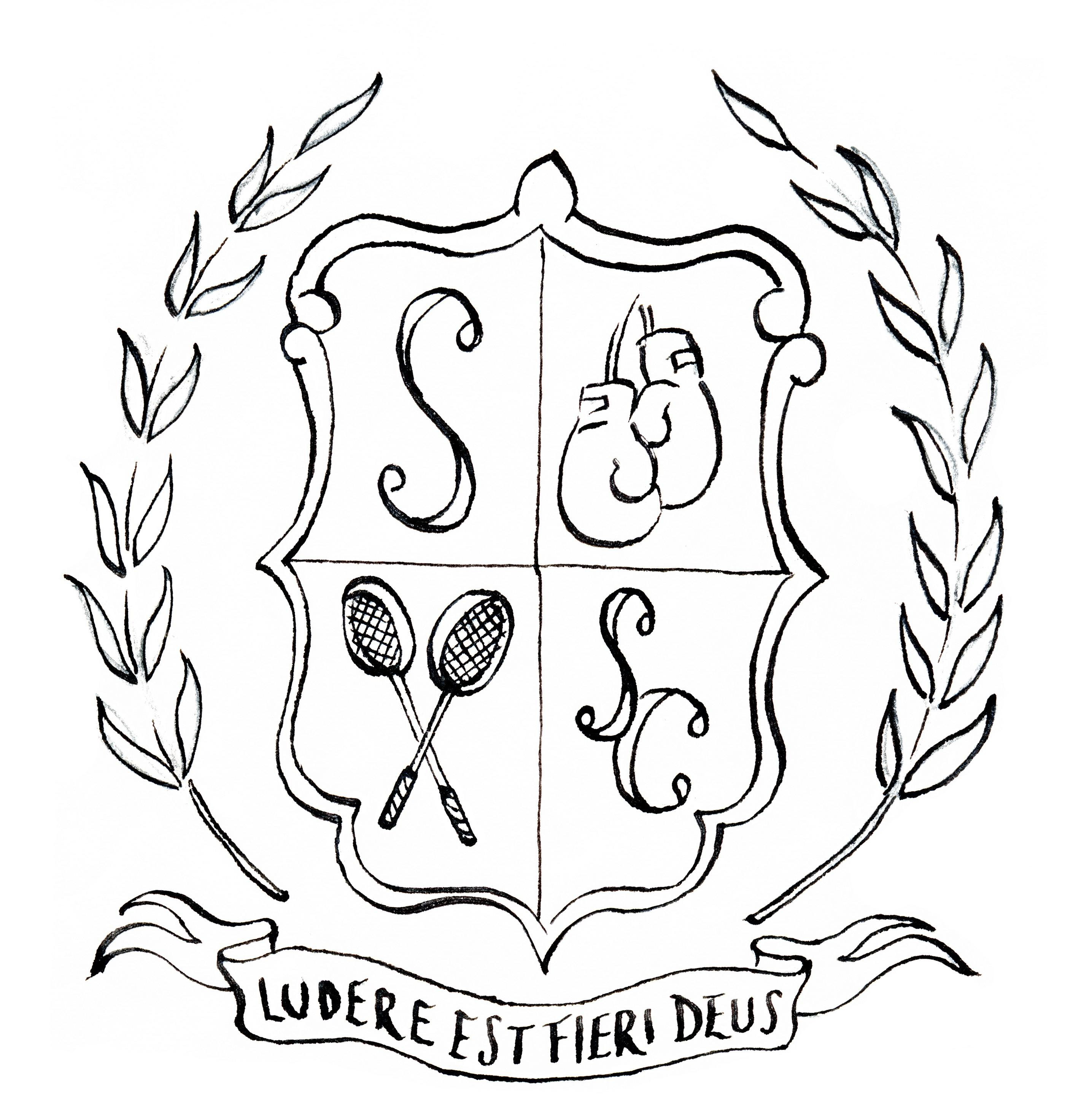
The New Enthusiast's Shuttlecoque Sporting Club Logo

Cistulli's essays and journalism have appeared in The New York Times, SBNation, FanGraphs, ESPN, The Hardball Times, The New Enthusiast, RotoWire, The Huffington Post, The Classical and The Portland Sportsman. He won the FSWA 2011 basketball sports writer of the year award for his writing at Rotowire and was elected to the Baseball Writers' Association of America in 2012.

=== Sabermetrics ===
Cistulli has written that his interest in sabermetrics is to explore "that place where quantitative analysis and aesthetics meet" in practicing what he calls the art of sabermetrical research. Within sabermetrics he is the creator of NERD, SCOUT and historical GBz%. Cistulli has influenced many contemporary sports thinkers including Rob Neyer who, asked about the value of Cistulli's work within the sabermetric community, responded "there's value in just about everything that Cistulli does. He's got an original mind and we'll ignore him at our peril."

== Radio hosting ==
Cistulli was previously the host of "Goal: The Soccer Show" (103.3 FM Northampton, MA) and "The Shuttlecoque Sporting Hour" (1450 AM Portland, OR.) He was formerly the host of FanGraphs Audio.

== Blue Jays ==
On November 16, 2018, Cistulli announced that he had been hired by the Toronto Blue Jays. He left Fangraphs to work for the team.

It was reported in 2019 that he worked alongside Jon Lalonde, Nick Manno, and Brent Urcheck to "curate running rankings of the players in each organization." Cistulli's title as of the end of 2024 was Assistant Director, Player Personnel in the Blue Jays' pro scouting department.

== Personal ==
Cistulli and Kali Coles announced their engagement in May 2009 and married in August. They have one son, Jackie.

== Works ==
- Englished by Diverse Hands (2003)
- Free Radicals: American Poets Before Their First Books (2004)
- Some Common Weaknesses Illustrated (2006)
- Assorted Fictions (2006)
- Origin, sixth series, Spring (2006)
- A Century of Enthusiasm (2007)
- The Prostituesdays Anthology (editor, 2008)
- Spirited Ejaculations of a New Enthusiast (2015)
