= NERD (sabermetrics) =

Baseball measurement of aesthetic value

In baseball statistics, NERD (Note: NERD is not an acronym—Cistulli wrote, "Were I to construct a stat designed to appeal to the baseball nerd, I’d call that stat NERD. What would/does it stand for? Hard to say, but it just feels so right.") is a quantitative measure of expected aesthetic value. NERD was originally created by Carson Cistulli and is part of his project of exploring the "art" of sabermetric research. The original NERD formula only took into account the pitcher's expected performance while a later model factors in the entire team's performance.

== History ==
The premise for NERD was developed in Cistulli's piece "Why We Watch" in which he establishes the five reasons that baseball continues to captivate the American imagination from game to game: "Pitching Matchups," "Statistically Notable (or Otherwise Compelling) Players," "Rookies (and Debuts)," "Seasonal Context," and "Quality of Broadcast". Fellow sabermatrician Rob Neyer, who had collaborated with Cistulli on this piece, wrote "the only thing missing [...] is a points system that would let us put a number on each game" and on June 2, 2010, Cistulli unveiled the Pitcher NERD formula.

== Pitcher NERD ==
Pitcher NERD tries to determine which pitchers will be the most aesthetically appealing to watch for a baseball fan and is both a historical and a predictive statistic. The formula uses a player's standard deviations from the mean (a weighted z-score) of the DIPS statistic xFIP (expected Fielding Independent Pitching), swinging strike percentage, overall strike percentage, and the differential between the pitcher's ERA and xFIP to determine a quantitative value for each pitcher.

$p\text{NERD} = (x \text{FIP}z \times 2) + (\text{SwStrk}\%z/2) + (\text{Strike}\%z / 2) + \text{LUCK} + 4.69$

The factor of 4.69 is added to make the number fit on a 0 to 10 scale. While there has been some disagreement on the calculation of Cistulli's luck component, the general consensus among sports writers seems to be that a player with a below-average ERA and an above-average xFIP has been "unlucky".

== Team NERD ==
Following the model of his Pitching NERD, Team NERD tries to give a quantitative value to the aesthetic value of each of the 30 baseball teams. For factors it accounts for "Age," "Park-Adjusted weighted Runs Above Average (wRAA)," "Park-Adjusted Home Run per Fly Ball (HR/FB)," "Team Speed," "Bullpen Strength," "Team Defense," "Luck" (Base Runs – Actual Runs Scored), and "Payroll".

$t\text{NERD} = \text{AGE}z \times 2 + \text{BAT}z + \text{HR}/\text{FB}z + (\text{SBA}z + \text{SBR}z + \text{XBT}z)\times .33 + \text{BL}z + \text{UZR}z + \text{PAY}z + \text{LUCK}$

In an interview, Cistulli admitted that there is a disconnect between the Tampa Bay Rays high tNERD rating and low attendance saying that he is considered adding a "park-adjustment" to his formula which would reflect either the stadium itself or "attendance relative to the stadium's capacity" but overall reception of this statistic has been positive and Fangraphs started reporting Team NERD in Cistulli's "One Night Only" columns beginning August 23, 2010.
