= Defensive spectrum =

Baseball concept

In sabermetrics, the defensive spectrum is a graphical representation of the positions on a baseball field, arranged from the easiest (such as first base and the outfield corners) on the left to the hardest (such as the catcher and middle infielders) on the right.

== The spectrum ==
The defensive spectrum is:

Designated hitter – First baseman – Left fielder – Right fielder – Third baseman – Center fielder – Second baseman – Shortstop – Catcher – Pitcher

In some versions of the defensive spectrum, pitcher and catcher are not included, since the demands of those positions are so specialized as to be inapplicable to players at other positions. The designated hitter is sometimes omitted as well, since that player does not take part in defensive plays.

As an example of the concept in action, players who are drafted by Major League Baseball teams as shortstops are far more likely to ultimately end up at a different position than players who are drafted as first basemen.

== History ==
Like many original sabermetric concepts, the idea of a defensive spectrum was first introduced by Bill James in his Baseball Abstract series of books during the 1980s. The basic premise of the spectrum is that positions on the right side of the spectrum are more difficult than the positions on the left side. Therefore, the positions are easier to fill as one goes left on the spectrum, since the physical demands are less. A corollary to this is that, since defensive skill is at less of a premium on the left side, players at those positions must provide more offense than those on the right. Another corollary is that players can generally move from right to left along the spectrum successfully during their careers (especially as they age), but moving a player from left to right is quite risky.

== Historical shifts ==
A retrospective analysis of the 140-year history of baseball shows that the defensive spectrum shifted once. In the late 19th century and early 20th century, third base was generally considered to be more challenging than second base. This was because the double play was relatively uncommon in this period; thus, the third baseman, who had to field hard hit grounders and throw the ball 120 feet to first base, had a far more challenging job than the second baseman, who threw the ball 70 feet at most. Frequent bunting also meant that the third baseman would be challenged defensively more often.

As a result, there were far more good hitters at second base than third (including players such as Nap Lajoie and Rogers Hornsby), and the defensive spectrum was:

First baseman – Left fielder – Right fielder – Second baseman – Center fielder – Third baseman – Shortstop – Catcher – Pitcher

However, by the 1920s and 1930s, the defensive spectrum began to shift. Double plays were steadily becoming more common, increasing the defensive responsibilities of the second baseman. Offense correspondingly became more important at third base. One of the new breed of third basemen was Harlond Clift of the St. Louis Browns, who became the first third baseman to hit 30 home runs. By 1945, second base was firmly established as a more important position defensively than third base.

In the early 2020s, due in part to increasing numbers of strikeouts and use of infield shifts, teams have become increasingly willing to move players to more difficult positions (rightward along the spectrum). Players such as Ryan McMahon, Max Muncy, Travis Shaw, and Mike Moustakas have transitioned, either permanently or temporarily, from third base to second base as part of a trend of physically larger athletes being placed at the latter position.
