= Keltner list =

The Keltner list is a systematic but non-numerical method for considering whether a baseball player is deserving of election to the National Baseball Hall of Fame in Cooperstown, New York. Developed by baseball statistician Bill James, it makes use of an inventory of questions (mostly yes-or-no format) regarding the merit of players relative to their peers. Enshrinement in the Hall of Fame is the highest honor in baseball, with only 263 players having been inducted as of 2020. Election to the Hall is also permanent. However, selection for the Hall is by election; no "cut-offs" or objective criteria exist (other than rules about how players become eligible for election). It can therefore be difficult for voters and fans alike to determine which former players are deserving of the honor.

The Keltner list comprises 15 questions designed to aid in the thought process. Each question is designed to be relatively easy to answer.

== History ==
Ken Keltner was a major-league third baseman who compiled a .276 batting average, 163 home runs and 852 RBI in his career. A timely hitter, the seven-time All-Star was a fabulous fielder known for going to his right. He ended Joe DiMaggio's record hit streak at 56 on July 17, 1941 before a then-record night crowd (67,468) in Cleveland. Keltner made two stops of DiMaggio line drives, one a brilliant backhanded stab. According to baseball historian Bill James in the 1994 book, Whatever Happened to the Hall of Fame?, a movement briefly developed to elect Keltner to the Hall of Fame. James created the eponymous list in order to evaluate the qualifications of players who have not been elected to the Hall, but merit consideration. As a subjective method, the Keltner list is not designed to yield an undeniable answer about a player's worthiness; for instance, as James says, "You can't total up the score and say that everybody who is at eight or above should be in, or anything like that."

The list originally appeared in James' 1985 Baseball Abstract along with the anecdote of how he developed the list.

== Questions on the Keltner list ==
Most of the 15 questions on the list are somewhat subjective, but all can be answered yes or no. For instance, the first question is "Was he ever regarded as the best player in baseball? Did anybody, while he was active, ever suggest that he was the best player in baseball?", others are "Is he the best player at his position who is eligible for the Hall of Fame but not in?" and "If this man were the best player on his team, would it be likely that the team could win the pennant?", and so forth.

Answers to the questions are often done by comparing the player's statistics to those of his peers or contemporaries. These statistics can take the form of traditional baseball measures, such as batting average and home runs, or advanced measures, such as Win Shares or JAWS. Furthermore, questions 7 and 8 are often answered using two more of James' innovations: Similarity Scores and Hall of Fame Standards, respectively.

== Uses other than baseball ==
The Keltner list has also been used to evaluate NBA players in consideration for that league's equivalent.

It has also been adapted to evaluate candidates for the Rock and Roll Hall of Fame and USA Ultimate Hall of Fame.

== Examples ==
Examples of the use of the Keltner list include the evaluations of:

- Don Mattingly
- Dale Murphy
- Keith Hernandez
- Mike Mussina
- Fred McGriff
- Darrell Evans

== See also ==
- Sabermetrics
