= Power hitter =

Type of batter in baseball

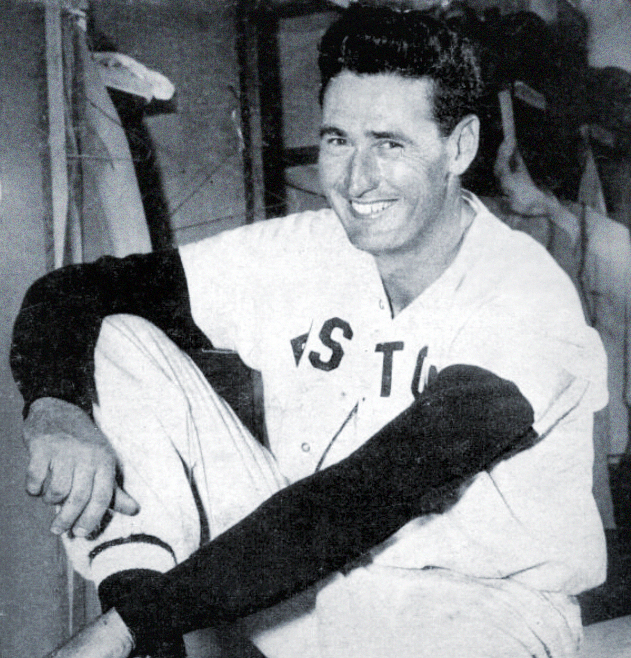
Iconic Major League Baseball player Ted Williams, pictured here in 1949, is known as a famous "power hitter".

A power hitter is a baseball player who has the ability to routinely hit the ball a long distance, resulting in a high number of extra base hits (home runs, doubles, and triples). In baseball, a power hitter typically bats fourth or "cleanup" in a Major League lineup, which consists of 9 hitters in a rotating order.

Evaluating a player's ability as a power hitter often involves using statistics such as slugging percentage (calculated by dividing a player's total bases by their total at bats). Isolated Power (ISO), a measure showing the number of extra bases earned per time at bat that's calculated by subtracting a player's batting average from their slugging percentage, is another statistic used.

== Famous power hitters in baseball history ==
Barry Bonds, who set the record for the most home runs in a season in Major League Baseball history, is often cited as a power hitter. His career was later bogged down by allegations regarding performance enhancing drugs. However, he managed a total of 762 home runs while also earning a comparatively high ISO compared to his rivals, with the publication Business Insider labeling him #3 in a list of the greatest power hitters of all time.

Prior to Barry Bonds breaking the single season home run record in 2001, Sammy Sosa and Mark McGwire closely competed for the record in 1998 with Sosa finishing with 66 home runs and McGwire with 70 home runs to secure the title.

Other baseball figures so cited include the famous hitters Babe Ruth, Hank Aaron, Lou Gehrig, and Ted Williams. Popular newspaper writer Victor O. Jones wrote about Williams in particular, "Ted is lucky to come along in a baseball age that worships on the shrine of power, pure, unadulterated power."

== See also ==
- Power pitcher
- List of Major League Baseball career home run leaders
- List of Major League Baseball career slugging percentage leaders
