= The New Enthusiast =

The New Enthusiast.
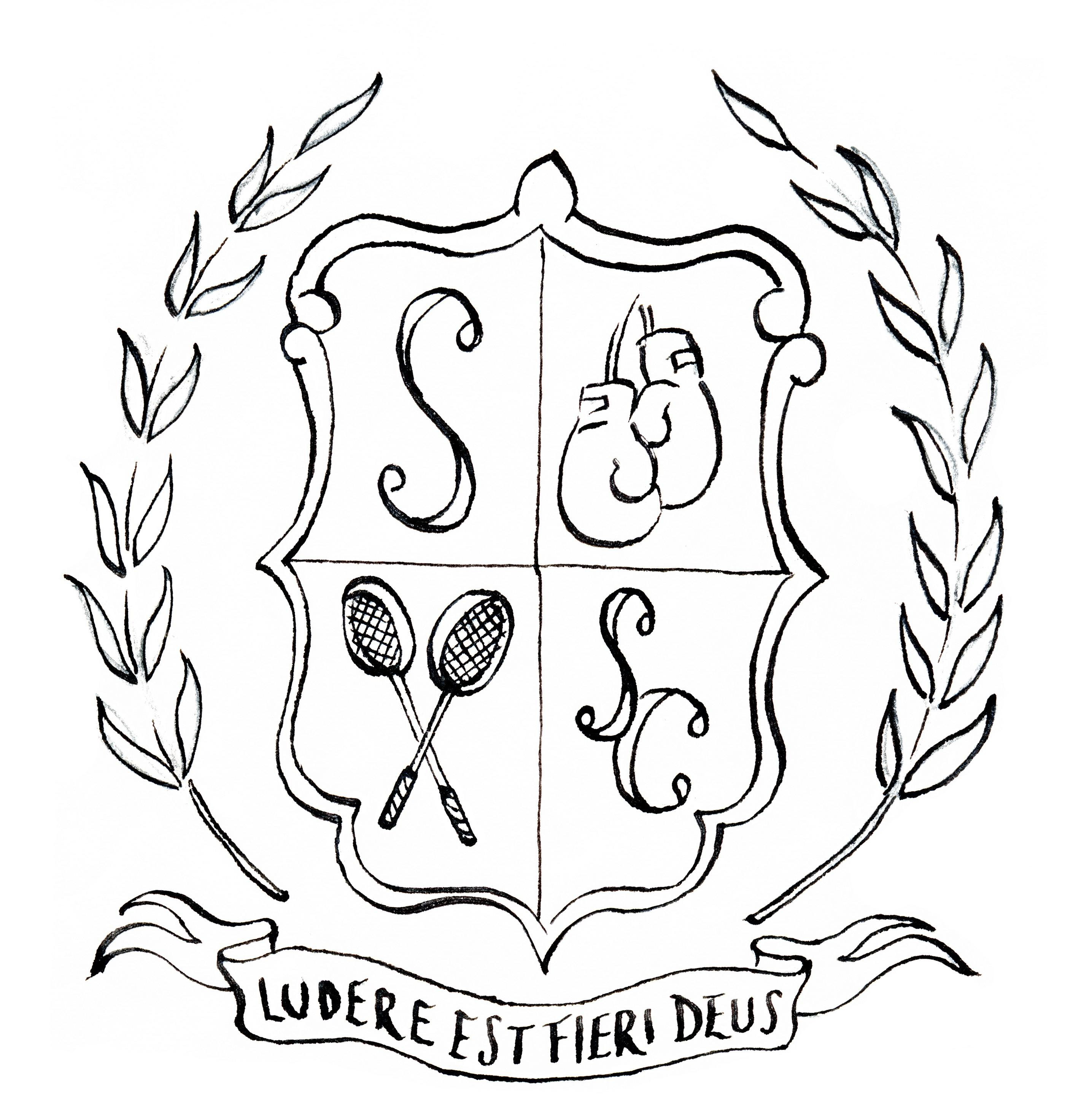
- Categories: Sport, literature
- First issue: November 29, 2007
- Country: USA
- Language: English

The New Enthusiast is a print and online magazine published by The Shuttlecoque Sporting Club. It was one of the first venues through which poet Carson Cistulli published his writings from November 2007 to April 2008.

== History ==
On November 15, 2007, The Shuttlecoque Sporting Club released a pilot issue to accompany its radio program the Shuttlecoque Sporting Hour (which aired that year on 1450AM Portland, Oregon). On November 29, 2007, the weekly New Enthusiast Week in Review magazine released its initial issue. The goal, as announced in the initial mission statement, was "spreading the Gospel of Enthusiasm" to reach "the Good Life, by which term we mean freedom from anxiety, emotional disturbance, and unnecessary exertions (a state known as ataraxia in the Greek)." The initial staff included F.J. Mahoulahan, Carson Cistulli, and Eamon ffitch as editors.

While the third issue offered a book review of Some Common Weaknesses Illustrated, Carson Cistulli himself would make his debut in the fourth issue with his piece "In Which the Authors Predict a Miracle".

== Guiding principles ==
The magazine was formed around five principles: Sports as "provocation," "play," "ethical living," "friendship," and "faith in search of understanding." While the magazine would eventually pay attention to the statistical elements as well, it was founded in view of these initial ideas, "to call attention to, and ably champion, those aspects of sport that are either most ennobling or transcendent."
