= Runs produced =

Runs produced is a baseball statistic that can help estimate the number of runs a hitter contributes to his team. The formula adds together the player's runs and run batted in, and then subtracts the player's home runs.

$RP = R+RBI-HR$

Home runs are subtracted to compensate for the batter getting credit for both one run and at least one RBI when hitting a home run.

Unlike runs created, runs produced is a teammate-dependent stat in that it includes Runs and RBIs, which are affected by which batters bat near a player in the batting order. Also, subtracting home runs seems logical from an individual perspective, but on a team level it double-counts runs that are not home runs.

To counteract the double-counting, some have suggested an alternate formula which is the average of a player's runs scored and runs batted in.

$RP = (R + RBI)/2$

Here, when a player scores a run, he shares the credit with the batter who drove him in, so both are credited with half a run produced. The same is true for an RBI, where credit is shared between the batter and runner. In the case of a home run, the batter is responsible for both the run scored and the RBI, so the runs produced are (1 + 1)/2 = 1, as expected.

== All-time Major League Baseball leaders ==
| Player | Career length | Runs produced |
|---|---|---|
| Ty Cobb | 1905–1928 | 4,066 |
| Hank Aaron | 1954–1976 | 3,716 |
| Babe Ruth | 1914–1935 | 3,673 |
| Cap Anson | 1871–1897 | 3,501 |
| Barry Bonds | 1986–2007 | 3,461 |
| Albert Pujols | 2001-2022 | 3,429 |
| Stan Musial | 1941–1963 | 3,425 |
| Alex Rodriguez | 1994–2016 | 3,411 |
| Lou Gehrig | 1923–1939 | 3,390 |
| Honus Wagner | 1897-1927 | 3,367 |

== See also ==
- Baseball statistics
