= Keltner, Kentucky =

Unincorporated community in Kentucky, United States

Keltner
- Unincorporated community
- Location within the state of Kentucky Keltner (the United States)
- Coordinates: 37°5′42″N 85°30′37″W
- Country: United States
- State: Kentucky
- County: Adair
- Elevation: 965 ft (294 m)
- Time zone: UTC-6 (Central (CST))
  - Summer (DST): UTC-5 (CDT)
- GNIS feature ID: 508376

Keltner is an unincorporated community in Adair County, Kentucky, United States. Its elevation is 965 feet (294 m).
