= Plate appearances per strikeout =

Ratio of the number of times a batter strikes out to their plate appearance

In baseball statistics, plate appearances per strikeout (PA/SO) represents the ratio of a batter's plate appearances to their strikeouts.

This statistic enables a defensive team to identify hitters in the opposing team's lineup who are more prone to striking out. Such players tend to be more aggressive than the average hitter, when batting, allowing the pitcher to approach them with more pitching options, often throwing more balls out of the strike zone in hopes that the batter will swing and miss.

The PA/SO statistic can be calculated by dividing a player's total plate appearances by their total strikeouts. For example, Reggie Jackson accumulated 2,597 strikeouts and 11,418 plate appearances throughout his 21-year baseball career, recording a PA/SO of 4.39. This means that, on average, Jackson struck out once every 4.39 plate appearances.

== Sources ==
- MLB.com – Baseball basics abbreviations
- FanGraphs Sabermetrics Library
