= Win Shares =

Book by Bill James

- Author: Bill James and Jim Henzler
- Subject: Baseball statistics
- Publisher: STATS, Inc.
- Publication date: 2002
- Pages: 729
- ISBN: 1-931584-03-6
- OCLC: 49718211

Win Shares is a 2002 book about baseball written by Bill James and Jim Henzler. The book explains how to apply the concept of sabermetrics to assess the impact of player performance in a combination of several areas, including offensive, defensive, and pitching on their team's overall performance. The resulting "Win Share" also takes into account factors such as the era in which the player was active to allow easy comparisons between players from different eras. The book focuses primarily on the many formulas involved in computing the final number of win shares accumulated.

Win Shares Digital Update, a companion volume of tables and statistics through the 2001 season.

== Concept ==
Win shares is the name of the metric developed by James in his book. It considers statistics for baseball players, in the context of their team and in a sabermetric way, and assigns a single number to each player for his contributions for the year. A win share represents one-third of a team win, by definition. If a team wins 80 games in a season, then its players will share 240 win shares. The formula for calculating win shares takes up pages 16–100 in the book. The general approach is to take the team's win shares (i.e., 3 times its number of wins) and divide them between offense and defense.

In baseball, all the player's pitching, hitting, and defensive contributions are considered. Statistics are adjusted for park, league, and era. On a team with equal offensive and defensive prowess, hitters receive 48% of the win shares and those win shares are allocated among the hitters based on runs created. An estimation is then made to decide what amount of the defensive credit goes to pitchers and what amount goes to fielders. Pitching contributions typically receive 35% (or 36%) of the win shares, and defensive contributions receive 17% (or 16%) of the win shares. The pitching contributions are allocated among the pitchers based on runs prevented, the pitchers' analog to runs created. Fielding contributions are allocated among the fielders based on multiple assumptions and a selection of traditional defensive statistics.

In Major League Baseball, based on a 162-game schedule, a typical All-Star player might accumulate around 20 win shares in a season. When a player exceeds 30 win shares, it is considered indicative of MVP-level performance, meaning the player is directly responsible for approximately 10 wins for their team. Achieving 40 or more win shares in a season is considered exceptional and represents a historic level of performance. For pitchers, win share levels are typically lower, often closely aligning with their actual number of wins.

Win shares differ from other sabermetric player rating metrics such as Total player rating and VORP in that it is based on total team wins, not runs above replacement.

The Bill James Historical Baseball Abstract, 2001 edition, also written by James, uses win shares to evaluate the careers of many players and to place them in contexts where they can be compared. The two books are effectively companions to one another.

=== Criticism of win shares ===
- Players cannot be awarded "loss shares", or negative win shares, by definition. Some critics of the system argue that negative win shares are necessary. In defense of the system, proponents argue that very few players in a season would amass a negative total if it were possible. However, critics argue, that when one player does amass a negative total, he is zeroed out, thus diminishing other players' win-share totals. In an attempt to fix this error, some have developed a modified system in which negative win shares are indeed possible.
- The allocation of win shares 48% offense and 52% defense is justified by James in that pitchers typically receive less credit than hitters in win shares and would receive far too few win shares if they were divided evenly.
- One criticism of this metric is that players who play for teams that win more games than expected, based on the Pythagorean expectation, receive more win shares than players whose team wins fewer games than expected. Since a team exceeding or falling short of its Pythagorean expectation is generally acknowledged as chance, some believe that credit should not be assigned purely based on team wins. However, team wins are the bedrock of the system, whose purpose is to assign credit for what happened. Win shares are intended to represent the player's value (what they were responsible for) rather than the player's ability (what the player's true skill level is).

Within the sabermetric community, there is ongoing debate as to the details of the system. The Hardball Times has developed its own Win Shares, as well as several derivative statistics, such as Win Shares Above Bench, Win Shares Percentage, Win Shares Above Average, and All-Star Win Shares.

== Reviews ==
Writing for ESPN, baseball author and columnist Rob Neyer called the book "groundbreaking". Glenn Guzzo echoed him in The New Ballgame: Baseball Statistics for the Casual Fan, calling it a "groundbreaking volume". Dave Studeman of Hardball Times observed that the book was well received by readers. Bill Felber, in The Book on the Book: An Inquiry Into Which Strategies in the Modern Game Actually Work, compares James' philosophy as to use of relievers in the book with those he endorsed as a Boston Red Sox executive.

In A Mathematician at the Ballpark: Odds and Probabilities for Baseball Fans, Professor Ken Ross describes the book as "erudite and interesting". The Oakland Tribune notes that it takes James more than 100 pages in the book to explain his formula. Leigh Grossman, in The Red Sox Fan Handbook: Everything You Need to Know to Be a Red Sox Fan Or to Marry One, called it "a book that statheads had been anticipating for years." The Concord Monitor noted that at a game "a few ultra-dedicated fans even sit in the back row with their Bill James books and calculators tabulating Mainers win shares". In Practicing Sabermetrics: Putting the Science of Baseball Statistics to Work, by Gabriel B. Costa, Michael R. Huber, and John T. Saccoman, the authors discuss how James provides both a short form method and a long form method for calculation in his book, and that the easier short form method appears to work well for years after 1920.

== Other sports ==
Justin Kubatko of Sports Reference has also applied the win shares concept to NBA players, with a few modifications, such that wins and win shares are equal (that is, a team that wins 50 games will have 50 win shares available), and the modification of the formula to allow for negative win shares (such that a player with negative win shares played poorly enough as to negatively impact the team's success).

Kubatko later developed a "point shares" value to NHL players, using a similar calculation method to the NBA win shares, with the major difference being that points are used as opposed to wins, with one point being equivalent to one point share.
