= Quality of Pitch =

Quality of Pitch (QOP) is a theoretical pitch quantification statistic combines speed, location and movement into a single numeric value that quantifies the quality of a baseball pitch. QOP was developed by Jarvis Greiner and Jason Wilson of Biola University, California, as a method of objectively evaluating pitches in baseball. QOPBASEBALL is the brand of the QOP statistic.

== Development ==
Greiner, one of the main contributors to the QOP statistic, was a film major and a pitcher for the Biola University baseball team in 2010. He came up with the idea for QOP while designing a statistics project for his then-professor, Wilson. He had realized that, while fastballs were generally judged by their speed, there was no standardized, quantitative measurement for other types of throws, particularly curveballs.

Greiner filmed 30 of his teammates' pitches, and asked his baseball coach, John Verhoeven, to rate the pitches according to batting difficulty on a scale of 0 to 100. Afterwards, he watched the filmed pitches and obtained the pitches’ initial height, breaking point, maximum height, and final location. A multiple regression model was then used to derive the initial version of the Greiner Index, a precursor to the QOP metric.

The Greiner Index (GI) is calculated with the following formula,

GI = -2.51rise + 1.88breakpoint – 0.47knee_dist + 0.51total break

where rise refers to the number of inches the ball rises vertically to the maximum height, break point the horizontal distance (in feet) from the release point to the maximum height, total break the number of vertical feet from the maximum ball height to the point it crosses the plate, and knee distance (also known as location) the number of inches above (positive) or below (negative) the batter's knee.

A single pitch with a 3-inch rise, 0.47 foot total break, 21.5 break point, and 8 inch location change, for example, would be calculated in this way:

$GI = (-2.51)(3)+(1.88)(21.5)-(0.47)(8)+(0.51)(0.47)$

In this case, the Greiner Index would be 53.6 points.

After the Greiner Index was developed, Wilson expanded it to create the QOP metric, which then made its debut at the 2015 SABR conference. Specifically, the final location was reevaluated to take two dimensions into account, speed and horizontal break were added to the equation, and the model was generalized to include all pitches (not just curveballs). The method for calculating QOP is patented (#US 10,737167 B2), and the statistics were made available online in 2016.

The overall QOP of a pitch is increased by the following components:

- Decreased rise (for curveballs)
- Increased total break
- Increased late vertical break
- Increased horizontal break
- Closeness to corners of strike zone
- Increased velocity

Since QOP is measured by breaking a pitch down into its individual components and analyzed from there, the pitch's rating does not depend on the batter's batting performance. This differentiates QOP from other commonly used pitching statistics, such as ERA (Earned Run Average).

Some critics argue that the QOP metric is not truly objective because of its basis in the Greiner Index, which was calculated based on the ratings of John Verhoeven.

== QOP and conventional baseball statistics ==
The QOP metric has been shown to have significant relationships with other, more conventional baseball statistics.

When variables like pitch type, pitch count, runners on base, and times through the batting order are factored out, QOP has been demonstrated to have a statistically significant negative correlation with ERA (earned run average). In other words, a higher QOP (a better pitch) is correlated with a lower ERA (less runs earned). Wilson wrote that "averaged over all seasons, for players with an ERA of five or higher in one season, if they also have a QOPA [average QOP] over five, the prediction accuracy is 85.5 percent".

Home runs per 9 innings (HR/9) has a negative relationship with QOP as well, with a peak at -0.5 that, while as of yet unexplained, can also be found in the relationship between HR/9 and mph.

The QOP metric also illuminates the relationship between pitch quality and batting order: not only does pitch quality generally go down the second and third time through the batting order, but the general pattern usually remains the same each time through the order. The first and ninth batters face pitches with the highest QOP, on average, and the fourth, fifth, and eighth face the lowest.

== Applications ==
Potential practical applications of QOP include tracking pitcher improvement (comparing pitches during and between seasons), scouting (if implemented on a radar gun for use in minor leagues and overseas), preventing injury (tracking significant decline throughout a season), and fan enjoyment (a potential complement to mph or rpm). It has not been proven to satisfy these applications.
