= Inside Sports =

American sports magazine

- Categories: Sports magazine
- Frequency: Monthly
- Founded: 1979
- Final issue: 1998
- Company: Newsweek; Century Publishing
- Country: United States
- Based in: Evanston, Illinois

Inside Sports magazine was a major general interest sports magazine in the United States. Launched in 1979 by Newsweek, it was designed as an edgier, monthly alternative to the longer-running Sports Illustrated and SPORT Magazine brands. In addition to 12 issues a year, it featured a "Swimsuit Spectacular" (IS' answer to the famous Sports Illustrated Swimsuit Issue).

In 1982, Inside Sports was acquired by Evanston, Illinois-based Century Publishing (later renamed Lakeside Publishing). The magazine was resurrected by Editor-in-Chief Michael K. Herbert and ran successfully under the Century banner for nearly 20 years. Los Angeles Times columnist Mike Downey wrote a monthly humor feature, "The Good Doctor." Later editors were Vince Aversano, Larry Burke and Ken Leiker. In June 1998, Inside Sports was sold by Century to Petersen Publishing Company, owner of longtime rival SPORT, and merged the two magazines under the SPORT title.

In the two years that followed, SPORT was bought by emap plc and continued to struggle in the market, especially when ESPN the Magazine began filling Inside Sports' old niche in 1998. In August 2000, after appearing every month for 54 years, SPORT magazine ceased publication, thus ending the lineage of Inside Sports.
