= The Bill James Historical Baseball Abstract =

1985 book by Bill James

The New Bill James Historical Baseball Abstract
- First edition
- Author: Bill James
- Language: English
- Publisher: Villard Books
- Publication date: 1985
- Publication place: United States
- Media type: Print (Book)
- Pages: 1008
- ISBN: 0-684-80697-5
- Preceded by: The Bill James Historical Baseball Abstract

The Bill James Historical Baseball Abstract is a reference book written by Bill James featuring an overview of professional baseball decade by decade, along with rankings of the top 100 players at each position. The original edition was published in 1985 by Villard Books, updated in paperback in 1988, then followed by The New Bill James Historical Baseball Abstract in 2001. In the 2001 edition, James introduced his win shares system, an attempt to quantify a player's overall contributions to his team, which he used as part of his player ranking system. A revised edition was published in paperback in 2003.

== See also ==
- Casey Award
