= Isolated power =

Sabermetric baseball statistic

In baseball, isolated power or ISO is a sabermetric computation used to measure a batter's raw power. One formula is slugging percentage minus batting average.

$ISO = SLG - AVG$

$= \frac{\mathit{TB} - H}{AB}$

$= \frac{(\mathit{1B}) + (2 \times \mathit{2B}) + (3 \times \mathit{3B}) + (4 \times \mathit{HR})}{AB} - \frac{H}{AB}$

$= \frac{(\mathit{1B}) + (2 \times \mathit{2B}) + (3 \times \mathit{3B}) + (4 \times \mathit{HR}) - (\mathit{1B} + \mathit{2B} + \mathit{3B} + \mathit{HR})}{AB}$

$= \frac{(\mathit{2B}) + (2 \times \mathit{3B}) + (3 \times \mathit{HR})}{AB}$

The final result measures how many extra bases a player averages per at bat. A player who hits only singles would thus have an ISO of 0. The maximum ISO is 3.000, and can only be attained by hitting a home run in every at-bat.

The term "isolated power" was coined by Bill James, but the concept dates back to Branch Rickey and his statistician Allan Roth.

== See also ==
- PECOTA
