= Baseball statistics =

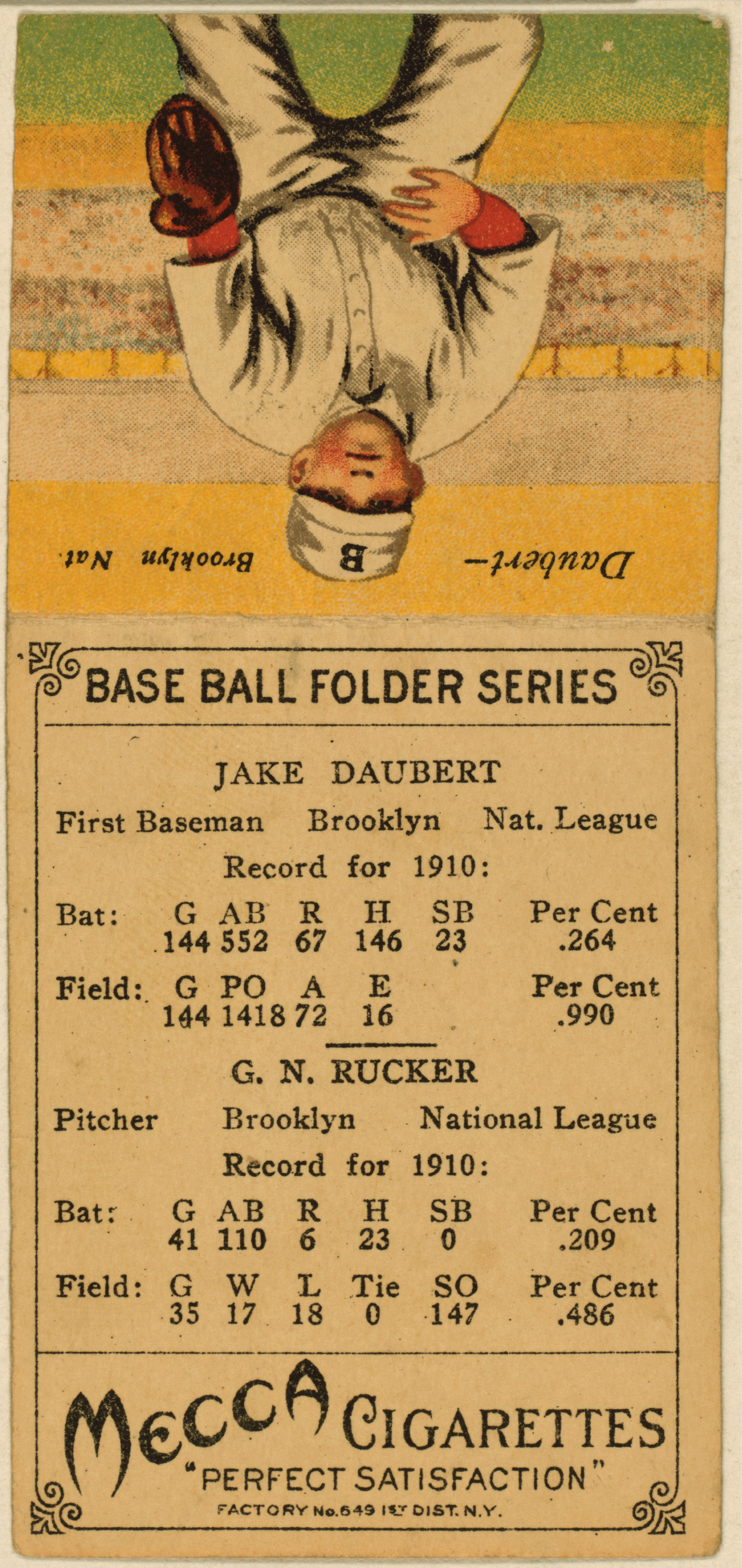
1911 baseball card showing Jake Daubert, his statistics, and statistics for Nap Rucker.

Baseball statistics collect a variety of metrics used to evaluate player and team performance in the sport of baseball.

Because the flow of a baseball game has natural breaks, and player performance is individually measurable, the sport lends itself to easy record-keeping and compiling statistics. Baseball "stats" have been recorded since the game's beginnings as a sport in the middle of the nineteenth century, and are widely available through the historical records of leagues such as the National Association of Professional Base Ball Players and the Negro leagues, although the consistency, standards, and calculations are often incomplete or questionable.

Since the National League (NL) was founded in 1876, statistics in the most elite levels of professional baseball have been kept, with efforts to standardize the stats and their compilation improving during the early 20th century. Such efforts have evolved together with advances in technology ever since. The NL was joined by the American League (AL) in 1903; together the two constitute modern Major League Baseball. A number of statistics are defined in the Official Baseball Rules, which task the official scorer with providing a report after each game.

Advances in both statistical analysis and technology made possible by the "PC revolution" of the 1980s and 1990s have driven teams and fans to evaluate players by an ever more elaborate set of statistics, which hold them to ever-evolving standards. With the advent of these methods, players can be compared across different eras and run scoring environments.

== Development ==
The practice of keeping records of player achievements was started in the 19th century by English-American sportswriter Henry Chadwick. Based on his experience with the sport of cricket, Chadwick devised the predecessors to modern-day statistics including batting average, runs scored, and runs allowed.

Traditionally, statistics such as batting average (the number of hits divided by the number of at bats) and earned run average (the average number of runs allowed by a pitcher per nine innings, less errors and other events out of the pitcher's control) have dominated attention in the statistical world of baseball. However, the recent advent of sabermetrics has created statistics drawing from a greater breadth of player performance measures and playing field variables. Sabermetrics and comparative statistics attempt to provide an improved measure of a player's performance and contributions to his team from year to year, frequently against a statistical performance average.

Comprehensive, historical baseball statistics were difficult for the average fan to access until 1951, when researcher Hy Turkin published The Complete Encyclopedia of Baseball. In 1969, Macmillan Publishing printed its first Baseball Encyclopedia, using a computer to compile statistics for the first time. Known as "Big Mac", the encyclopedia became the standard baseball reference until 1988, when Total Baseball was released by Warner Books using more sophisticated technology. The publication of Total Baseball led to the discovery of several "phantom ballplayers", such as Lou Proctor, who did not belong in official record books and were removed.

== Use ==
Throughout modern baseball, a few core statistics have been traditionally referenced – batting average, RBI, and home runs. To this day, a player who leads the league in all of these three statistics earns the "Triple Crown". For pitchers, wins, ERA, and strikeouts are the most often-cited statistics, and a pitcher leading his league in these statistics may also be referred to as a "triple crown" winner. General managers and baseball scouts have long used the major statistics, among other factors and opinions, to understand player value. Managers, catchers and pitchers use the statistics of batters of opposing teams to develop pitching strategies and set defensive positioning on the field. Managers and batters study opposing pitcher performance and motions in attempting to improve hitting. Scouts use stats when they are looking at a player who they may end up drafting or signing to a contract.

Some sabermetric statistics have entered the mainstream baseball world that measure a batter's overall performance including on-base plus slugging, commonly referred to as OPS. OPS adds the hitter's on-base percentage (number of times reached base by any means divided by total plate appearances) to their slugging percentage (total bases divided by at-bats). Some argue that the OPS formula is flawed and that more weight should be shifted towards OBP (on-base percentage). The statistic wOBA (weighted on-base average) attempts to correct for this.

OPS is also useful when determining a pitcher's level of success. "Opponent on-base plus slugging" (OOPS) is becoming a popular tool to evaluate a pitcher's actual performance. When analyzing a pitcher's statistics, some useful categories include K/9IP (strikeouts per nine innings), K/BB (strikeouts per walk), HR/9 (home runs per nine innings), WHIP (walks plus hits per inning pitched), and OOPS (opponent on-base plus slugging).

However, since 2001, more emphasis has been placed on defense-independent pitching statistics, including defense-independent ERA (dERA), in an attempt to evaluate a pitcher's performance regardless of the strength of the defensive players behind them.

All of the above statistics may be used in certain game situations. For example, a certain hitter's ability to hit left-handed pitchers might incline a manager to increase their opportunities to face left-handed pitchers. Other hitters may have a history of success against a given pitcher (or vice versa), and the manager may use this information to create a favorable match-up. This is often referred to as "playing the percentages".

== Contemporary statistics ==
The following listings include abbreviations and/or acronyms for both historic baseball statistics and those based on modern mathematical formulas known popularly as "metrics".

The explanations below are for quick reference and do not fully or completely define the statistic; for the strict definition, see the linked article for each statistic.

=== Batting statistics ===
- 1B – Single: hits on which the batter reaches first base safely without the contribution of a fielding error
- 2B – Double: hits on which the batter reaches second base safely without the contribution of a fielding error
- 3B – Triple: hits on which the batter reaches third base safely without the contribution of a fielding error
- AB – At bat: plate appearances, not including bases on balls, being hit by pitch, sacrifices, interference, or obstruction
- AB/HR – At bats per home run: at bats divided by home runs
- BA – Batting average (also abbreviated AVG): hits divided by at bats (H/AB)
- BB – Base on balls (also called a "walk"): hitter not swinging at four pitches called out of the strike zone and awarded first base.
- BABIP – Batting average on balls in play: frequency at which a batter reaches a base after putting the ball in the field of play. Also a pitching category.
- BB/K – Walk-to-strikeout ratio: number of bases on balls divided by number of strikeouts
- BsR – Base runs: Another run estimator, like runs created
- EQA – Equivalent average: a player's batting average absent park and league factors
- FC – Fielder's choice: times reaching base safely because a fielder chose to try for an out on another runner
- GO/AO – Ground ball fly ball ratio: number of ground ball outs divided by number of fly ball outs
- GDP or GIDP – Ground into double play: number of ground balls hit that became double plays
- GPA – Gross production average: 1.8 times on-base percentage plus slugging percentage, divided by four
- GS – Grand slam: a home run with the bases loaded, resulting in four runs scoring, and four RBIs credited to the batter
- H – Hit: reaching base because of a batted, fair ball without error by the defense
- HBP – Hit by pitch: times touched by a pitch and awarded first base as a result
- HR – Home runs: hits on which the batter successfully touched all four bases, without the contribution of a fielding error
- HR/H – Home runs per hit: home runs divided by total hits
- ITPHR – Inside-the-park home run: hits on which the batter successfully touched all four bases, without the contribution of a fielding error or the ball going outside the ball park.
- IBB – Intentional base on balls: times awarded first base on balls (see BB above) deliberately thrown by the pitcher. Also known as IW (intentional walk).
- ISO – Isolated power: a hitter's ability to hit for extra bases, calculated by subtracting batting average from slugging percentage
- K – Strike out (also abbreviated SO): number of times that a third strike is taken or swung at and missed, or bunted foul. Catcher must catch the third strike or batter may attempt to run to first base.
- LOB – Left on base: number of runners neither out nor scored at the end of an inning
- OBP – On-base percentage: times reached base (H + BB + HBP) divided by at bats plus walks plus hit by pitch plus sacrifice flies (AB + BB + HBP + SF)
- OPS – On-base plus slugging: on-base percentage plus slugging average
- PA – Plate appearance: number of completed batting appearances
- PA/SO – Plate appearances per strikeout: number of times a batter strikes out to their plate appearance
- R – Runs scored: number of times a player crosses home plate
- RC – Runs created: an attempt to measure how many runs a player has contributed to their team
- RP – Runs produced: an attempt to measure how many runs a player has contributed
- RBI – Run batted in: number of runners who score due to a batter's action, except when the batter grounded into a double play or reached on an error
- RISP – Runner in scoring position: a breakdown of a batter's batting average with runners in scoring position, which includes runners at second or third base
- SF – Sacrifice fly: fly balls hit to the outfield which, although caught for an out, allow a baserunner to advance
- SH – Sacrifice hit: number of sacrifice bunts which allow runners to advance on the basepaths
- SLG – Slugging percentage: total bases achieved on hits divided by at-bats (TB/AB)
- TA – Total average: total bases, plus walks, plus hit by pitch, plus steals, minus caught stealing divided by at bats, minus hits, plus caught stealing, plus grounded into double plays [(TB + BB + HBP + SB – CS)/(AB – H + CS + GIDP)]
- TB – Total bases: one for each single, two for each double, three for each triple, and four for each home run [H + 2B + (2 × 3B) + (3 × HR)] or [1B + (2 × 2B) + (3 × 3B) + (4 × HR)]
- TOB – Times on base: times reaching base as a result of hits, walks, and hit-by-pitches (H + BB + HBP)
- XBH – Extra base hits: total hits greater than singles (2B + 3B + HR)
- xBA – Expected batting average: A statistic that estimates the probability that a hit ball will become an actual hit. Exit velocity and launch angle help determine the outcome.
- xwOBA – Expected weighted on-base average: A statistic that estimates a player's performance based on the contact quality. It takes launch angle, exit velocity, and other different measurements into consideration.
- Hard-hit rate: The percentage of a player's hit balls that reach an exit velocity of 95 miles per hour or above.
- EV – Exit velocity: The measurement of how hard the ball travels after impact with the bat.
- LA – Launch angle: The vertical angle of the ball after contact is made.

=== Baserunning statistics ===
- SB – Stolen base: number of bases advanced by the runner while the ball is in the possession of the defense
  - CS – Caught stealing: times tagged out while attempting to steal a base
  - SBA or ATT – Stolen base attempts: total number of times the player has attempted to steal a base (SB+CS)
  - SB% – Stolen base percentage: the percentage of bases stolen successfully. (SB) divided by (SBA) (stolen bases attempted).
  - DI – Defensive Indifference: if the catcher does not attempt to throw out a runner (usually because the base would be insignificant), the runner is not awarded a steal. Scored as a fielder's choice.
- R – Runs scored: times reached home plate legally and safely
- UBR – Ultimate base running: a metric that assigns linear weights to every individual baserunning event in order to measure the impact of a player's baserunning skill

=== Pitching statistics ===
- BB – Base on balls (also called a "walk"): times pitching four balls, allowing the batter to take first base
- BB/9 – Bases on balls per 9 innings pitched: base on balls multiplied by nine, divided by innings pitched
- BF – Total batters faced: opponent team's total plate appearances
- BK – Balk: number of times pitcher commits an illegal pitching action while in contact with the pitching rubber as judged by umpire, resulting in baserunners advancing one base
- BS – Blown save: number of times entering the game in a save situation, and being charged the run (earned or not) which eliminates his team's lead
- CERA – Component ERA: an estimate of a pitcher's ERA based upon the individual components of his statistical line (K, H, 2B, 3B, HR, BB, HBP)
- CG – Complete game: number of games where player was the only pitcher for their team
- DICE – Defense-Independent Component ERA: an estimate of a pitcher's ERA based upon the defense-independent components of his statistical line (K, HR, BB, HBP) but which also uses number of outs (IP), which is not defense independent.
- ER – Earned run: number of runs that did not occur as a result of errors or passed balls
- ERA – Earned run average: total number of earned runs (see "ER" above), multiplied by 9, divided by innings pitched
- ERA+ – Adjusted ERA+: earned run average adjusted for the ballpark and the league average
- FIP – Fielding independent pitching: a metric, scaled to resemble an ERA, that focuses on events within the pitcher's control – home runs, walks, and strikeouts – but also uses in its denominator the number of outs the team gets (see IP), which is not entirely within the pitcher's control.
  - xFIP: This variant substitutes a pitcher's own home run percentage with the league average
- G – Games (AKA "appearances"): number of times a pitcher pitches in a season
- GF – Games finished: number of games pitched where player was the final pitcher for their team as a relief pitcher
- GIDP – Double plays induced: number of double play groundouts induced
- GIDPO – Double play opportunities: number of groundout induced double play opportunities
- GIR – Games in relief: games as a non starting pitcher
- GO/AO or G/F – Ground Out to Air Out ratio, aka Ground ball fly ball ratio: ground balls allowed divided by fly balls allowed
- GS – Starts: number of games pitched where player was the first pitcher for their team
- H (or HA) – Hits allowed: total hits allowed
- H/9 (or HA/9) – Hits allowed per 9 innings pitched: hits allowed times nine divided by innings pitched (also known as H/9IP)
- HB – Hit batsman: times hit a batter with pitch, allowing runner to advance to first base
- HLD (or H) – Hold: number of games entered in a save situation, recorded at least one out, did not surrender the lead, and did not complete the game
- HR (or HRA) – Home runs allowed: total home runs allowed
- HR/9 (or HRA/9) – Home runs per nine innings: home runs allowed times nine divided by innings pitched (also known as HR/9IP)
- IBB – Intentional base on balls allowed
- IP – Innings pitched: the number of outs a team gets while a pitcher is pitching divided by 3
- IP/GS – Average number of innings pitched per game started
- IR – Inherited runners: number of runners on base when the pitcher enters the game
- IRA – Inherited runs allowed: number of inherited runners allowed to score
- K (or SO) – Strikeout: number of batters who received strike three
- K/9 (or SO/9) – Strikeouts per 9 innings pitched: strikeouts times nine divided by innings pitched
- K/BB (or SO/BB) – Strikeout-to-walk ratio: number of strikeouts divided by number of base on balls
- L – Loss: number of games where pitcher was pitching while the opposing team took the lead, never lost the lead, and went on to win
- LOB% – Left-on-base percentage: LOB% represents the percentage of baserunners a pitcher does not allow to score. LOB% tends to regress toward 70–72% over time, so unusually high or low percentages could indicate that pitcher's ERA could be expected to rise or lower in the future. An occasional exception to this logic is a pitcher with a very high strikeout rate.
- OBA (or just AVG) – Opponents’ batting average: hits allowed divided by at-bats faced
- PC-ST – An individual pitcher's total game pitches [Pitch Count] and [ST] his no. of strikes thrown within that PC.
- PIT (or NP) – Pitches thrown (Pitch count)
- PFR – Power finesse ratio: The sum of strikeouts and walks divided by innings pitched.
- pNERD – Pitcher's NERD: expected aesthetic pleasure of watching an individual pitcher
- QOP – Quality of pitch: comprehensive pitch evaluation statistic which combines speed, location and movement (rise, total break, vertical break and horizontal break) into a single numeric value
- QS – Quality start: a game in which a starting pitcher completes at least six innings and permits no more than three earned runs
- RA – Run average: number of runs allowed times nine divided by innings pitched
- SHO – Shutout: number of complete games pitched with no runs allowed
- SIERA – Skill-Interactive Earned Run Average: another advanced stat that measures pitching. SIERA builds on FIP and xFIP by taking a deeper look at what makes pitchers better.
- SV – Save: number of games where the pitcher enters a game led by the pitcher's team, finishes the game without surrendering the lead, is not the winning pitcher, and either (a) the lead was three runs or fewer when the pitcher entered the game; (b) the potential tying run was on base, at bat, or on deck; or (c) the pitcher pitched three or more innings
- SVO – Save opportunity: When a pitcher 1) enters the game with a lead of three or fewer runs and pitches at least one inning, 2) enters the game with the potential tying run on base, at bat, or on deck, or 3) pitches three or more innings with a lead and is credited with a save by the official scorer
- W – Win: number of games where pitcher was pitching while their team took the lead and went on to win, also the starter needs to pitch at least 5 innings of work (also related: winning percentage)
- W + S – Wins in relief + saves.
- whiff rate: a term, usually used in reference to pitchers, that divides the number of pitches swung at and missed by the total number of swings in a given sample. If a pitcher throws 100 pitches at which batters swing, and the batters fail to make contact on 26 of them, the pitcher's whiff rate is 26%.
- WHIP – Walks and hits per inning pitched: average number of walks and hits allowed by the pitcher per inning
- WP – Wild pitches: charged when a pitch is too high, low, or wide of home plate for the catcher to field, thereby allowing one or more runners to advance or score

=== Fielding statistics ===
- A – Assists: number of outs recorded on a play where a fielder touched the ball, except if such touching is the putout
- CI – Catcher's Interference (e.g., catcher makes contact with bat)
- DP – Double plays: one for each double play during which the fielder recorded a putout or an assist.
- E – Errors: number of times a fielder fails to make a play he should have made with common effort, and the offense benefits as a result
- FP – Fielding percentage: total plays (chances minus errors) divided by the number of total chances
- INN – Innings: number of innings that a player is at one certain position
- PB – Passed ball: charged to the catcher when the ball is dropped and one or more runners advance
- PO – Putout: number of times the fielder tags, forces, or appeals a runner and he is called out as a result
- RF – Range factor: 9*(putouts + assists)/innings played. Used to determine the amount of field that the player can cover
- TC – Total chances: assists plus putouts plus errors
- TP – Triple play: one for each triple play during which the fielder recorded a putout or an assist
- UZR – Ultimate zone rating: the ability of a player to defend an assigned "zone" of the field compared to an average defensive player at his position

=== Overall player value ===
- VORP – Value over replacement player: a statistic that calculates a player's overall value in comparison to a "replacement-level" player. There are separate formulas for position players and pitchers
- Win shares: a complex metric that gauges a player's overall contribution to his team's wins
- WAR – Wins above replacement: a non-standard formula to calculate the number of wins a player contributes to his team over a "replacement-level player"
- PWA – Player Win Average: performance of players is shown by how much they increase or decrease their team's chances of winning a specific game
- PGP – Player Game Percentage: defined as, "the sum of changes in the probability of winning the game for each play in which the player has participated"

=== General statistics ===
- G – Games played: number of games where the player played, in whole or in part
- GS – Games started: number of games a player starts
- GB – Games behind: number of games a team is behind the division leader
- Pythagorean expectation: estimates a team's expected winning percentage based on runs scored and runs allowed

== See also ==
- Baseball awards
- Cy Young Award winners
- Glossary of baseball terms
- Hank Aaron Award winners (best offensive performer)
- List of MLB awards
- MLB Most Valuable Player Award winners
- MLB Rookie of the Year Award winners
- Official Baseball Rules (OBR)
- List of pitches
- Rawlings Gold Glove Award winners
- Retrosheet
- Sabermetrics
- Silver Slugger Award winners
- Society for American Baseball Research (SABR)
- Strike zone
- Triple Crown in Major League Baseball

== Bibliography ==
- Albert, Jim, and Jay M. Bennett. Curve Ball: Baseball, Statistics, and the Role of Chance in the Game. New York: Copernicus Books, 2001. ISBN 0-387-98816-5. A book on new statistics for baseball. MLB Record Book by: MLB.com
- Alan Schwarz, The Numbers Game: Baseball's Lifelong Fascination with Statistics (New York: St. Martin's, 2005). ISBN 0-312-32223-2.
- The Official Site of Major League baseball – Baseball Basics: Abbreviations
