= Bill James =

American baseball writer and statistician

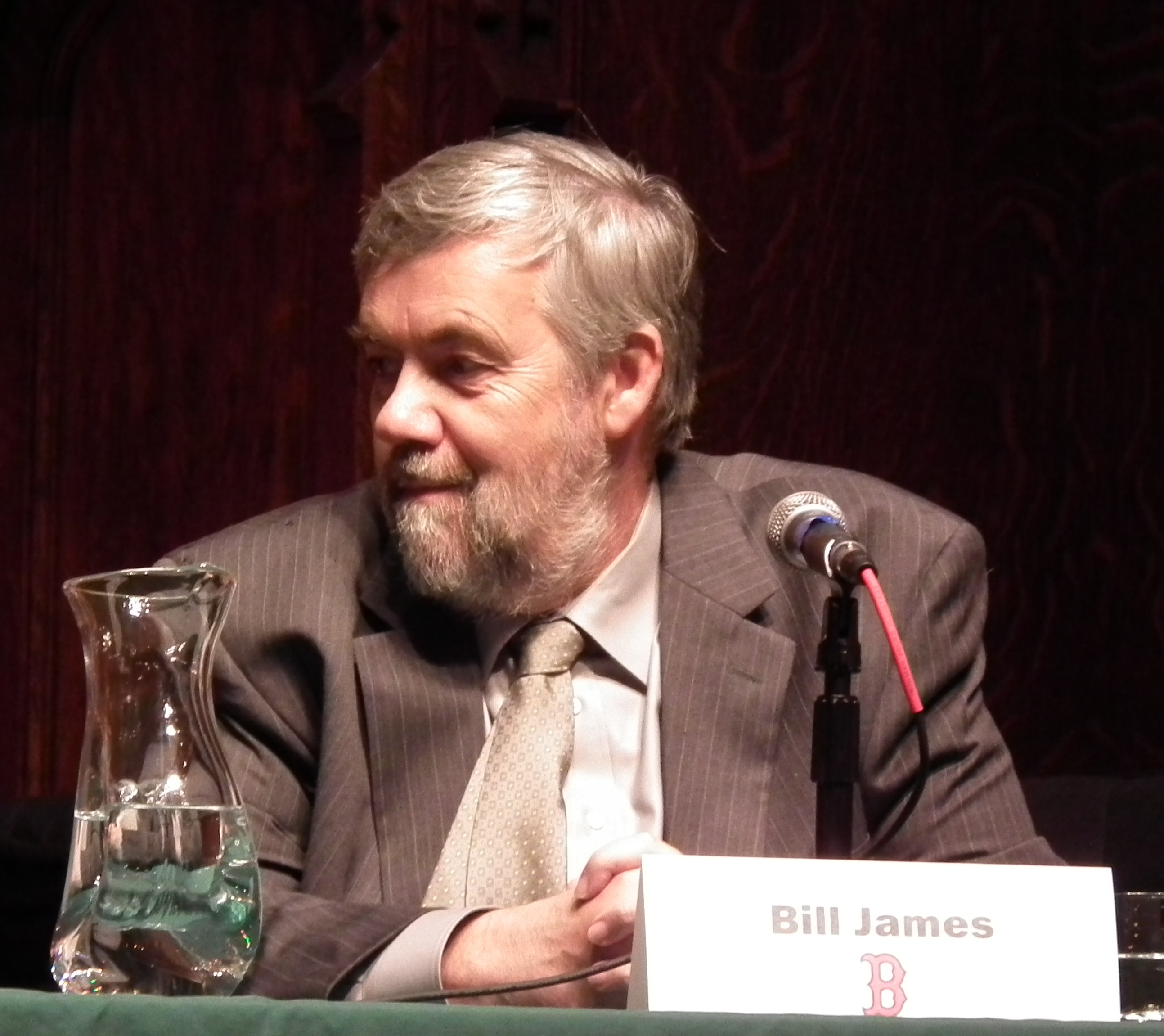
- James in 2010
- Born: George William James; October 5, 1949 (age 77); Holton, Kansas, U.S.
- Education: University of Kansas
- Occupations: Baseball historian; statistician
- Years active: 1977–present
- Known for: Sabermetrics
- Military career
- Allegiance: United States
- Branch: United States Army
- Service years: 1971–1973

George William James (born October 5, 1949) is an American baseball writer, historian, and statistician whose work has been widely influential. Since 1977, James has written more than two dozen books about baseball history and statistics. His approach, which he named sabermetrics after the Society for American Baseball Research (SABR), scientifically analyzes and studies baseball, often through the use of statistical data, in an attempt to determine why teams win and lose.

In 2006, Time named him in the Time 100 as one of the most influential people in the world. In 2003, James was hired as senior advisor on Baseball Operations for the Boston Red Sox and worked for the team for 17 years during which they won four World Series championships.

== Early life ==
James was born in Holton, Kansas. He joined the United States Army in 1971. After his service, he graduated from the University of Kansas in 1973 with degrees in English and economics, and in 1975 with a degree in education.

== Career ==
=== The Bill James Baseball Abstracts ===
An aspiring writer and obsessive fan, James began writing baseball articles in his mid-twenties after leaving the United States Army. Many of his first baseball writings came while he was doing night shifts as a security guard at the Stokely-Van Camp's pork and beans cannery. Unlike most writers, his pieces did not recount games in epic terms or offer insights gleaned from interviews with players. A typical James piece posed a question (e.g., "Which pitchers and catchers allow runners to steal the most bases?"), and then presented data and analysis that offered an answer.

Editors considered James's pieces so unusual that few believed them suitable for their readers. In an effort to reach a wider audience, James began self-publishing an annual book titled The Bill James Baseball Abstract, beginning in 1977. The first edition, titled 1977 Baseball Abstract: Featuring 18 categories of statistical information that you just can't find anywhere else, presented 68 pages of in-depth statistics compiled from James's study of box scores from the preceding season and was offered for sale through a small advertisement in The Sporting News. Seventy-five people purchased the booklet. The 1978 edition, subtitled The 2nd annual edition of baseball's most informative and imaginative review, sold 250 copies. Beginning in 1979, James wrote an annual preview of the baseball season for Esquire, and continued to do so through 1984.

The first three editions of the Baseball Abstract garnered respect for James's work, including a very favorable review by Daniel Okrent in Sports Illustrated. New annual editions added essays on teams and players. By 1982 sales had increased tenfold, and a media conglomerate agreed to publish and distribute future editions.

While writers had published books about baseball statistics before (most notably Earnshaw Cook's Percentage Baseball, in the 1960s), few had ever reached a mass audience. Attempts to imitate James's work spawned a flood of books and articles that continues to this day.

=== Post-Abstracts work ===
In 1988, James ceased writing the Abstract, citing workload-related burnout and concern about the volume of statistics on the market. He has continued to publish hardcover books about baseball history, which have sold well and received admiring reviews. These books include three editions of The Bill James Historical Baseball Abstract (1985, 1988, 2001, the last entitled The New Bill James Historical Baseball Abstract).

James has also written several series of new annuals:

- The Baseball Book (1990–1992) was a loosely organized collection of commentary, profiles, historical articles, and occasional pieces of research. James's assistant Rob Neyer was responsible for much of the research, and wrote several short pieces. Neyer went on to become a featured baseball columnist at ESPN and SB Nation.
- The Player Ratings Book (1993–95) offered statistics and 50-word profiles aimed at the fantasy baseball enthusiast.
- The Bill James Handbook (2003–present) provides past-season statistics and next-season projections for Major League players and teams, and career data for all current Major League players. Results for the Fielding Bible Awards, an alternative to the Gold Glove Awards voted on by a 10-person panel that includes James, are also included.
- The Bill James Gold Mine (2008–2010) was a collection of new essays and never-before-seen statistics, as well as profiles of players and teams.
- Playing off the name of the earlier series, Solid Fool's Gold: Detours on the Way to Conventional Wisdom (2011) was a mixed collection of both baseball-related and miscellaneous pieces, culled from the Bill James Online archives (see below).

In 2008, James launched Bill James Online. Subscribers could read James's new, original writing and interact with one another—as well as with James—in a question-and-answer format. The web site also offered new "profiles" of teams and players full of facts and statistics that hoped to map what James has termed "the lost island of baseball statistics". On June 9, 2023, James wrote an article for the site announcing that it would soon be closed in order for James to "focus on other projects".

=== STATS, Inc. ===
In an essay published in the 1984 Abstract, James vented his frustration about Major League Baseball's refusal to publish play-by-play accounts of every game. James proposed the creation of Project Scoresheet, a network of fans that would work together to collect and distribute this information.

While the resulting non-profit organization never functioned smoothly, it worked well enough to collect accounts of every game from 1984 through 1991. James's publisher agreed to distribute two annuals of essays and data—the 1987 and 1988 editions of Bill James Presents The Great American Baseball Statbook (though only the first of these featured writing by James).

The organization was eventually disbanded, but many of its members went on to form for-profit companies with similar goals and structure. STATS, Inc., the company James joined, provided data and analysis to every major media outlet before being acquired by Fox Sports in 2001.

== Innovations ==
Among the statistical innovations attributable to James are:

- Runs created. A statistic intended to quantify a player's contribution to runs scored, as well as a team's expected number of runs scored. Runs created is calculated from other offensive statistics. James's first version of it was:
  $$RC = \frac{(H+BB) \times TB}{AB+BB}$$
  Applied to an entire team or league, the statistic correlates closely (usually within 5%) to that team's or league's actual runs scored. Since James first created the statistic, sabermetricians have refined it to make it more accurate, and it is now used in many different variations.
- Range factor. A statistic that quantifies the defensive contribution of a player, calculated in its simplest form as (A is an assist, PO is a putout):
  $$RF = \frac{9 \times (A + PO)}\text{Innings}$$
  The statistic is premised on the notion that the total number of outs that a player participates in is more relevant in evaluating his defensive play than the percentage of cleanly handled chances as calculated by the conventional statistic fielding percentage.
- Defensive Efficiency Rating. A statistic that shows the percentage of balls in play a defense turns into an out. It is used to help determine a team's defensive ability. The formula is:
  $$DER = 1 - \frac{H + ROE - HR}{PA - K - BB - HBP - HR}$$
- Win shares. A unifying statistic intended to allow the comparison of players at different positions, as well as players of different eras. Win Shares incorporates a variety of pitching, hitting and fielding statistics. One drawback of Win Shares is the difficulty of computing it.
- Pythagorean Winning Percentage. A statistic explaining the relationship of wins and losses to runs scored and runs allowed. The statistic correlates closely to a team's actual winning percentage. Its simplest formula is:
  $$\mathrm{Pythagorean ~ W\%} = \frac{R^2}{R^2+RA^2}$$
- Game score is a metric to determine the strength of a pitcher in any particular baseball game. It has since been improved by Tom Tango.
- Major League Equivalency. A metric that uses minor league statistics to predict how a player is likely to perform at the major league level.
- The Brock2 System. A system for projecting a player's performance over the remainder of his career based on past performance and the aging process.
- Similarity scores. Scoring a player's statistical similarity to other players, providing a frame of reference for players of the distant past. Examples: Lou Gehrig comparable to Don Mattingly; Joe Jackson to Tony Oliva.
- Secondary average. A statistic that attempts to measure a player's contribution to an offense in ways not reflected in batting average. Secondary averages tend to be similar to batting averages, but can vary wildly, from less than .100 to more than .500 in extreme cases. The formula is (ISO is isolated power):
  $$\mathrm{SecA} = \frac{BB+(TB-H) + (SB-CS)}{AB} = \frac{BB + (SB-CS)}{AB} + ISO$$
- Power/Speed Number. A statistic that attempts to consolidate the various "clubs" of players with impressive numbers of both home runs and stolen bases (e.g., the 30–30 club (Bobby Bonds was well known for being a member), the 40–40 club (Jose Canseco was the first to perform this feat), and even the 25–65 club (Joe Morgan in the '70s)). The formula is:
  $$\mathrm{PSN} = \frac{2 \times HR \times SB}{HR + SB}$$
- Approximate Value. A system of cutoffs designed to estimate the value a player contributed to various category groups (including his team) to study broad questions such as "how do players age over time".
- "Temperature gauge" to determine how "hot" a player is, based on recent performance. The gauge has been used in NESN Red Sox telecasts and has provoked mixed reactions from critics.

Although James may be best known as an inventor of statistical tools, he has often written on the limitations of statistics and urged humility concerning their place amid other kinds of information about baseball. To James, context is paramount: he was among the first to emphasize the importance of adjusting traditional statistics for park factors and to stress the role of luck in a pitcher's win–loss record. Many of his statistical innovations are arguably less important than the underlying ideas. When he introduced the notion of secondary average, it was as a vehicle for the then-counterintuitive concept that batting average represents only a fraction of a player's offensive contribution. (The runs-created statistic plays a similar role vis-à-vis the traditional RBI.) Some of his contributions to the language of baseball, like the idea of the "defensive spectrum", border on being entirely non-statistical.

== Acceptance and employment in mainstream baseball ==
Oakland Athletics general manager Billy Beane began applying sabermetric principles to running his low-budget team in the early 2000s, to notable effect, as chronicled in Michael Lewis' book Moneyball.

In 2003, James was hired by a former reader, John Henry, the new owner of the Boston Red Sox.

One point of controversy was in handling the relief pitching of the Red Sox. James had previously published analysis of the use of the closer in baseball, and had concluded that the traditional use of the closer both overrated the abilities of that individual and used him in suboptimal circumstances. He wrote that it is "far better to use your relief ace when the score is tied, even if that is the seventh inning, than in the ninth inning with a lead of two or more runs." The Red Sox in 2003 staffed their bullpen with several marginally talented relievers. Red Sox manager Grady Little was never fully comfortable with the setup, and designated unofficial closers and reshuffled roles after a bad outing. When Boston lost a number of games due to bullpen failures, Little reverted to a traditional closer approach and moved Byung-hyun Kim from being a starting pitcher to a closer. The Red Sox did not follow James's idea of a bullpen with no closer, but with consistent overall talent that would allow the responsibilities to be shared. Red Sox reliever Alan Embree thought the plan could have worked if the bullpen had not suffered injuries. During the 2004 regular season Keith Foulke was used primarily as a closer in the conventional model; however, Foulke's usage in the 2004 postseason was along the lines of a relief ace with multiple inning appearances at pivotal times of the game. Houston Astros manager Phil Garner also employed a relief ace model with his use of Brad Lidge in the 2004 postseason.

During his tenure with the Red Sox, James published several new sabermetric books (see #Bibliography below). Indeed, although James was typically tight-lipped about his activities on behalf of the Red Sox, he is credited with advocating some of the moves that led to the team's first World Series championship in 86 years, including the signing of non-tendered free agent David Ortiz, the trade for Mark Bellhorn, and the team's increased emphasis on on-base percentage.

After the Red Sox suffered through a disastrous 2012 season, Henry stated that James had fallen "out of favor [in the front office] over the last few years for reasons I really don't understand. We've gotten him more involved recently in the central process and that will help greatly."

On October 24, 2019, James announced his retirement from the Red Sox, saying that he had "fallen out of step with the organization" and added that he hadn't earned his paycheck with the Red Sox for the last couple of years. During his time with the team, Bill James received four World Series rings for the team's 2004, 2007, 2013, and 2018 World Series titles.

== Other writing ==
James has written two true crime books, Popular Crime: Reflections on the Celebration of Violence (2011) and – together with his daughter Rachel McCarthy James – The Man from the Train (2017). The latter is an attempt to link scores of murders of entire families in the early 20th century United States to a single perpetrator. Those murders include the Villisca axe murders. The Jameses propose a solution to the murders based on the signature elements these killings share with each other.

James is a fan of the University of Kansas men's basketball team and has written about basketball. He has created a formula for what he calls a "safe lead" in the sport.

== In culture ==
Michael Lewis, in his 2003 book Moneyball, dedicates a chapter to James's career and sabermetrics as background for his portrayal of Billy Beane and the Oakland Athletics' unlikely success.

James was inducted into the Baseball Reliquary's Shrine of the Eternals in 2007.

James was profiled on 60 Minutes on March 30, 2008, in his role as a sabermetric pioneer and Red Sox advisor. In 2010, he was inducted into the Irish American Baseball Hall of Fame.

James made a guest appearance on The Simpsons 2010 episode "MoneyBART". He claimed "I've made baseball as fun as doing your taxes."

Steven Soderbergh's planned film adaptation of Moneyball would have featured an animated version of James as a "host". This script was discarded when director Bennett Miller and writer Aaron Sorkin succeeded Soderbergh on the project. Ultimately, the 2011 film mentions James several times. His bio is briefly recapped, and Billy Beane is depicted telling John Henry that Henry's hiring of James is the reason Beane is interested in the Red Sox general manager job.

== Controversies ==
=== Dowd Report controversy ===
In his Baseball Book 1990, James heavily criticized the methodology of the Dowd Report, which was an investigation (commissioned by baseball commissioner Bart Giamatti) on the gambling activities of Pete Rose. James reproached commissioner Giamatti and his successor, Fay Vincent, for their acceptance of the Dowd Report as the final word on Rose's gambling. (James's attitude on the matter surprised many fans, especially after the writer had been deeply critical of Rose in the past, especially for what James considered to be Rose's selfish pursuit of Ty Cobb's all-time record for base hits.)

James expanded his defense of Rose in his 2001 book The New Historical Baseball Abstract, with a detailed explanation of why he found the case against Rose flimsy. James wrote "I would characterize the evidence that Rose bet on baseball as... well, not quite non-existent. It is extremely weak." This countered the popular opinion that the case against Rose was a slam dunk, and several critics claimed James misstated some of the evidence in his defense of Rose. Derek Zumsteg of Baseball Prospectus wrote an exhaustive review of the case James made and concluded: "James' defense of Rose is filled with oversights, errors in judgment, failures in research, and is a great disservice to the many people who have looked to him for a balanced and fair take on this complicated and important issue."

In 2004, Rose admitted publicly he had bet on baseball and confirmed the Dowd Report was correct. James remained steadfast, continuing to insist that the evidence available to Dowd at the time was insufficient to reach the conclusion that it did.

=== Paterno controversy ===
On November 4, 2011, Jerry Sandusky was indicted for committing sex crimes against young boys, which brought the Penn State child sex abuse scandal to national attention. On December 11, 2011, James published an article called "The Trial of Penn State", depicting an imaginary trial in which Pennsylvania State University defended itself against charges of "acting rashly and irresponsibly in the matter of Joe Paterno, in such a manner that [they] defamed, libeled and slandered Paterno, unfairly demolishing his reputation."

On July 12, 2012, the Freeh report was released, charging Paterno and three other University officials with covering up reports of sexual assaults and enabling the attacker to prey on other children for more than a decade, often in Pennsylvania State University facilities. Soon afterwards, during an interview on ESPN radio, James claimed that the Freeh report's characterizations of Paterno as a powerful figure were wrong, and that it was not Paterno's responsibility to report allegations of child molestation to the police. "[Paterno] had very few allies. He was isolated and he was not nearly as powerful as people imagine him to have been." When asked if he knew anyone who had showered with a boy they were not related to, James said it was a common practice when he was growing up. "That was actually quite common in the town I grew up in. That was quite common in America 40 years ago."

The July 2012 interview comments were widely criticized. Rob Neyer wrote in defense of James. James's employer, the Boston Red Sox, issued a statement disavowing the comments James made and saying that he had been asked not to make further public comments on the matter.

=== "Replaceable players" controversy ===
On November 7, 2018, James participated in a Twitter conversation regarding comments made by agent Scott Boras about teams "tanking". James wrote:

If the players all retired tomorrow, we would replace them, the game would go on; in three years it would make no difference whatsoever. The players are NOT the game, any more than the beer vendors are.

This was arguably consistent with thoughts James had publicly expressed prior to his affiliation with the Red Sox. In an article in The 1988 Bill James Baseball Abstract, he had written:

This nation could support, without any detectable loss of player quality, at a very, very minimum, 200 major league teams.

Nonetheless, in the context of James's association with the Red Sox front office and baseball's checkered labor history (including alleged collusion amongst the owners in the previous offseason to curb free agent salaries), the tweets were taken by many as inflammatory. Major League Baseball Players Association executive director Tony Clark called James's comments "reckless and insulting". Other active or former players also objected. James told the New York Times:

I don't know that the idea that the game endures and we're all just passing through it is inherently an offensive idea. But if I phrased it in an offensive way, that was not my intention.

The Red Sox responded by issuing a statement saying:

Bill James is a consultant to the Red Sox. He is not an employee, nor does he speak for the club. His comments on Twitter were inappropriate and do not reflect the opinions of the Red Sox front office or its ownership group. Our Championships would not have been possible without our incredibly talented players — they are the backbone of our franchise and our industry. To insinuate otherwise is absurd.

== Personal life ==
James married Susan McCarthy in 1978. They have three children.

In January 2024, James announced that he had suffered a stroke, which impeded the use of his right hand.

== Bibliography ==
Baseball

- Bill James Baseball Abstract (annual editions published 1977–1988)
- The Bill James Historical Baseball Abstract (1985; revised edition 1988) ISBN 978-0394537139
- This Time Let's Not Eat the Bones (1989) ISBN 978-0394577142 (selection of comments from Abstracts and articles)
- The Bill James Baseball Book (annual editions published 1990–1992)
- The Politics of Glory (1994) (revised as Whatever Happened to the Hall of Fame?), ISBN 978-0684800882
- The Bill James Player Ratings Book (annual editions published 1993–1996)
- The Bill James Guide to Baseball Managers (1997) ISBN 978-0684806983
- Bill James Present STATS All-Time Major League Handbook (1998; 2nd ed. 2000) ISBN 978-1884064814
- Bill James Present STATS All-Time Major League Sourcebook (1998) ISBN 978-1884064531
- The New Bill James Historical Baseball Abstract (2001) ISBN 978-0684806976
- Win Shares (2002)
- Win Shares Digital Update (2002) (PDF form only)
- The Bill James Handbook (annual editions published 2003–present)
- The Neyer/James Guide to Pitchers (2004, with co-author Rob Neyer) ISBN 978-0743261586
- The Bill James Gold Mine (annual editions published 2008–2010, ISBN 978-0879463205, ISBN 978-0879463694)
- Solid Fool's Gold (2011), ISBN 978-0879464592 (articles from Bill James Online website)
- Fools Rush Inn (2014), ISBN 978-0879464974 (more articles from Bill James Online website)

Crime history

- Popular Crime – Reflections on the Celebration of Violence (ISBN 978-1-4165-5273-4, published 2011)
- The Man from the Train (2017), ISBN 978-1-4767-9625-3

== Books about James ==
- The Mind of Bill James (2006) ISBN
- How Bill James Changed Our View of Baseball: by Colleagues, Critics, Competitors and Just Plain Fans (2007) ISBN 978-0879463175

== See also ==
- Baseball Prospectus
- Defensive spectrum
- Keltner list
- Similarity score
- Win shares
