= Economy (basketball) =

Basketball mathematical statistical formula

Economy is a basketball mathematical statistical formula that was created in order to determine the ball possession efficiency of ball handlers, mainly primary ball handlers and point guards. It is considered a basic statistic of the top-tier level Greek League.

== Calculation ==
The statistic's formula is:

- (Assists + Steals) - Turnovers

== See also ==
- PER
- Efficiency
- Offensive Rating
- Defensive Rating
- Tendex
- PIR
- Basketball Statistics
- Fantasy Basketball
