= Performance index rating =

Statistical formula used in basketball

The performance index rating (PIR) is a basketball mathematical statistical formula that is used by the EuroLeague Commercial Assets (ECA)'s first and second tier competitions, the EuroLeague and the EuroCup, as well as various European national domestic and regional leagues. It is a part of the Tendex basketball rating system. It is also variously referred to as performance index ranking, rating, ranking, evaluation, valuation, and efficiency. It is similar to, but not the same as, the NBA's efficiency (EFF) stat.

== History ==
PIR was created in 1991, by the Spanish ACB League, which started using it to determine the league's MVP of the Week and regular season MVP awards. In 2004, the ACB League changed the criteria by which it chooses the regular season MVP award, but it continues to use PIR to determine the MVP of each week of the season.

The PIR stat was at one time used to determine the MVPs of separate stages of the EuroLeague season. Like the EuroLeague MVP of the Round, the EuroLeague Group Stage MVP, and the EuroLeague Top 16 Stage MVP. However, this changed when the EuroLeague MVP award became based on a voting process, starting with the 2004–05 season. PIR is still used to determine the EuroLeague's MVP of the Round, and the second-tier level EuroCup's MVP of the round awards.

The validity of major European professional basketball leagues using PIR as a way to rank players and give MVP awards has been criticized, over the fact that it does not take into account, nor use, any weighting system to determine the importance of each individual stat; unlike the Player Efficiency Rating (PER) rating stat, which was created by John Hollinger, when he worked at ESPN as a sports writer.

== Calculation ==
The stat's formula is:

- (points + rebounds + assists + steals + blocks + fouls drawn) − (missed field goals + missed free throws + turnovers + shots rejected + fouls committed).

== See also ==
- Tendex
- Player efficiency rating
- Efficiency
- Offense efficiency rating
- Defensive rating
- Economy
- Basketball statistics
- Fantasy basketball
