= Tendex =

The Tendex system is a basketball mathematical statistical formula that was created by sports writer Dave Heeren, in order to determine the playing efficiency of basketball players. It is generally accepted as the original weighted advanced stat formula used in the sport of basketball.

== Calculation ==
The Tendex statistical system has 3 different formulas and is calculated as follows:

Standard Tendex Rating: (Tendex raw statistical formula)

(Points) + (Rebounds) + (Assists) + (Steals) + (Blocks) - (Missed Field Goals) - 0.5 * (Missed Free Throws) - (Turnovers) - (Fouls Committed) / (Minutes Played) / (Game Pace (Possessions Per Game, typically ranges from 60 to 75))

Modified Tendex Rating: (Tendex weighted average statistical formula)

(Points) + (Rebounds) + 1.25 * (Assists) + 1.25 * (Steals) + (Blocks) - 1.25 * (Turnovers) - (Missed Field Goals) - (Missed Free Throws / 2) - (Fouls Committed / 2)  / (Minutes Played) / (Game Pace (Possessions Per Game, typically ranges from 60 to 75))

European Tendex Rating (Performance Index Rating (PIR)): (EuroLeague / EuroCup)

(Points + Rebounds + Assists + Steals + Blocks + Fouls Drawn) - (Missed Field Goals + Missed Free Throws + Turnovers + Shots Rejected + Fouls Committed)

== See also ==
- PER
- Efficiency
- Offensive Rating
- Defensive Rating
- PIR
- Economy
- Basketball Statistics
- Fantasy Basketball
