= Efficiency (basketball) =

Statistic for comparing the overall value of a basketball player

In professional basketball, the most commonly used statistical benchmark for comparing the overall value of players is called efficiency. It is a composite basketball statistic that is derived from basic individual statistics: points, rebounds, assists, steals, blocks, turnovers, and shot attempts. In theory, efficiency accounts for both a player's offensive contributions (points and assists) and their defensive contributions (steals and blocks), but it is generally thought that efficiency ratings favor offense-oriented players over those who specialize in defense, as defense is difficult to quantify with currently tabulated statistics.

== NBA ==
=== EFF ===
The NBA publishes online all of the basic basketball statistics recorded officially by the league. Individual player efficiency is expressed there by a stat referred to as 'efficiency' and abbreviated EFF. It is derived by a simple formula:

(PTS + REB + AST + STL + BLK − Missed FG − Missed FT - TO) / GP

The formula was created by Kansas City sports reporter and statistician Martin Manley.

=== DPR ===
DPR (short for Defensive Player Rating) is a stat that shows the Defensive prowess of a player showing their in game ability and defensive impact to their team by using a per game formula that equates for the amount of time spent on the court and taking into account position competition pace and era as well as other factors. This is the formula:

( (Player spg+ Player bpg) / team minutes played )-( times blown by * Pace of Players Era ) * Total Average of Possessions + ( Players DRTG * Team Pace ) / Total number of years played

=== PER ===
The most commonly used alternative to the EFF is the player efficiency rating developed by ESPN basketball statistician John Hollinger. It is denoted as PER, and is derived by a very complex calculation designed to compensate for different teams' varying style of play, among other factors. PER scores do not differ markedly from EFF scores, but player rankings will not be the same in both systems.

A PER of 15 is considered average across the entire league (not true of EFF), and serves as a simple benchmark against which any player may be quickly compared to indicate his approximate net worth to an NBA franchise. Teams intending to compete for the championship typically seek to enlist at least two star players with high efficiency ratings above the low twenties.

A PER of 30 over a span of more than a few games is considered exceptionally high. According to the modified PER formula used at Basketball-Reference.com, the highest PER ever achieved over an entire single season in the NBA was 32.85 by Nikola Jokić in 2021–22. Wilt Chamberlain held the distinction of being the only player with a PER over 30 over an entire single season for 2½ decades, after having a PER of 31.84 in 1962–63. No other player surpassed 30 until Michael Jordan in 1987–88 with a PER of 31.71. Since then, Jordan repeated the accomplishment three more times, and the milestone has also since been eclipsed by David Robinson, Shaquille O'Neal (three times), Tracy McGrady, Dwyane Wade, LeBron James (four times), Anthony Davis (twice), Stephen Curry, Russell Westbrook, Giannis Antetokounmpo (three times), Nikola Jokić (four times) and Joel Embiid (four times). No PER statistics are available pre-1951–52 as the 'minutes played' statistic was first recorded during that season.

In the 2021–22 NBA season, three players achieved this feat : Nikola Jokić (32.85), Giannis Antetokounmpo (32.05) and Joel Embiid (31.16). Jokić broke Chamberlain's record of 32.08, kept for 60 years.

Player efficiency rating NBA records:

- Highest career player efficiency rating: Nikola Jokić (27.92)
- Highest single-season player efficiency rating: Nikola Jokić (32.85 in 2021–22)
- Highest career playoff player efficiency rating: Nikola Jokić (29.02) - still active
- Highest single-season playoff player efficiency rating: Hakeem Olajuwon (38.96 in 1988)

== EuroLeague and EuroCup ==
The EuroLeague, its second-tier level competition, the EuroCup, and several European national domestic leagues, use a different type of formula to determine the ratings and efficiency of players, called the performance index rating (PIR):

- (Points + Rebounds + Assists + Steals + Blocks + Fouls Drawn) - (Missed Field Goals + Missed Free Throws + Turnovers + Shots Rejected + Fouls Committed).

== See also ==
- NBA records
- Player efficiency rating
- Offense efficiency rating
- Basketball statistics
- Fantasy basketball
- Advanced statistics in basketball
- True shooting percentage
