= RAPM =

RAPM may refer to

- Russian Association of Proletarian Musicians, a former association of Soviet musicians
- RAPM, the advanced form of Raven's Progressive Matrices, a non-verbal intelligence test
- Regularized Adjusted Plus-Minus, in ice hockey analytics
- Regularized Adjusted Plus Minus, a basketball analytic
- Risk-adjusted profitability/performance measures, in risk aggregation
- Refugi antiaeri de la placeta Macià (RapM), a museum in Catalonia
