= David Berri =

American sports economist

David J. Berri
- Born: September 26, 1969 (age 56)
- Education: Nebraska Wesleyan University (BA), Colorado State University (MA, PhD)
- Occupations: Sports economist, professor
- Employer: Southern Utah University
- Known for: The Wages of Wins, NBA analytics, Wins Produced model

David J. Berri (born September 26, 1969) is a sports economist and professor of economics at Southern Utah University, known for his sometimes-controversial analysis of NBA basketball. He is a past president of the North American Association of Sports Economists, and a member of the editorial board of the Journal of Sports Economics and The International Journal of Sport Finance.

== Academic background ==
Berri graduated from Nebraska Wesleyan University with a B.A. in economics in 1991, and earned both his M.A. and Ph.D. from Colorado State University. He taught economics at Coe College and California State University-Bakersfield before accepting a position at Southern Utah University in 2008.

== The Wages of Wins ==
Berri is best known for co-authoring, along with Martin Schmidt and Stacey Brook, the 2006 book The Wages of Wins: Taking Measure of the Many Myths in Modern Sport. The book opened to favorable reviews in several major media outlets, including endorsements from Canadian journalist Malcolm Gladwell in The New Yorker and Joe Nocera in The New York Times. In The Wages of Wins, Berri, Schmidt, & Brook look at the 4 major North American sports from an academic, econometric point of view, investigating issues like the relationship between payrolls and wins, quarterback play in the NFL, and competitive balance in baseball.

The portion of the book that has drawn the most attention—positive and negative—has been Berri's analysis of the NBA, particularly with regard to player performance. By running a series of linear regressions, Berri has developed a model called "Wins Produced", which "explains 95% of team wins". The Wins Produced model is a refinement of an earlier model put forth in a 1999 paper published in the journal "Managerial and Decision Economics".

Berri's work is frequently viewed as a lightning rod for criticism because the Wins Produced model often runs counter to the conventional wisdom of basketball. Berri has not discouraged such controversy, either, in his posts for The Wages of Wins' accompanying blog, "The Wages of Wins Journal", which frequently criticizes NBA decision-makers (i.e., coaches and general managers) and members of the media.

== Criticism ==
Berri has come out in opposition of certain traditional linear weights-style NBA evaluatory statistics like TENDEX and the NBA's official "efficiency" metric, claiming that they overvalue scoring and undervalue shooting efficiency. A similar criticism has been made of John Hollinger's Player Efficiency Rating, a model that Berri also argues significantly undervalues shooting efficiency. He has also criticized non-box score-based stats like Adjusted Plus-Minus, claiming that the basic box score numbers tell decision-makers most of what they need to know about a player's value. In December 2011, Berri released an updated version that adjusted the defensive rebound weight to account for diminishing returns.

Berri has provided data on women's basketball for the journal The Ladies League as well as several other media outlets.

== Stumbling on Wins ==
Stumbling on Wins: Two Economists Expose the Pitfalls on the Road to Victory in Professional Sports is Berri and Schmidt's follow up on The Wages of Wins and was published in March 2010 by FT Press.
