= Computer-aided scouting =

Computer-aided sports scouting is the use of data analysis by computer to assist sports scouts to identify and recruit new talented players. Pioneers like Bill James began to analyze the data and apply mathematical principals and new non-conventional formulas to predict success and failures of a baseball player or team, a development called sabermetrics. The foundation of computer-aided scouting is statistics.

== Critics circle ==
Computer-aided scouting began as a means for scouts and managers to log mass amounts of player and team information compiled from box scores, stat-sheets and personalized specific information pertaining to players and teams. This information was interpreted through mathematical formulas created from research studies of each sport. Once this information was tabulated, team personnel begin to implement these results into the game. After early positive results, many professional teams adopted mathematical tools for player and game management.

MLB and the NBA begin to employ these analysis and move them into prominent roles inside their teams as Scouts to even General Managers. The marriage between Computer-aided Scouting and human eye Scouting has been at odds for over a decade. Both ways of scouting have proven to be as viable and valuable as the other. The NCAA has adapted a rating system produced by Jeff Sagarin that uses computer-aided scouting to a science to better understand the strength and weaknesses of a team as a rating.

Computer-aided scouting has adapted mathematical formulas by taking into account an existing or potential players value to his team, his physical attributes, and even projected success/failures against a variety of situations and potential opponents. Some of these methods have been published by members of sabermetrics for baseball and APBR for basketball.
