= Roger Noll =

American economist

- Born: March 13, 1940 (age 86); Monterey Park, California

Academic background
- Education: California Institute of Technology (B.S. with honors, 1962); Harvard University (Ph.D., 1967)
- Doctoral advisor: Robert Dorfman

Academic work
- Discipline: Sports economics
- Institutions: Stanford University
- Doctoral students: Jeffrey Milyo; Barry R. Weingast
- Awards: Guggenheim Fellowship in Economics (1983)

Roger Noll (born March 13, 1940) is an American economist and emeritus professor of economics at Stanford University. He is also a fellow at the Stanford Institute for Economic Policy Research and the director of the Program in Regulatory Policy there. He is known for his research on sports economics, such as the construction of professional sports stadiums. He has testified against the NCAA in multiple court cases, including O'Bannon v. NCAA. In 1983, he received a Guggenheim Fellowship in economics.
