= Daryl Morey =

American basketball executive (born 1972)

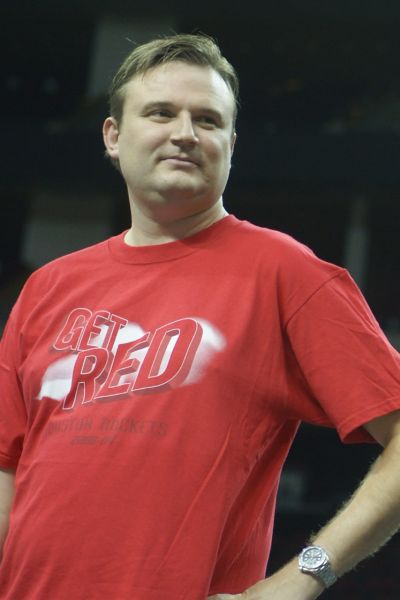
- Morey in 2008

Personal information
- Born: September 14, 1972 (age 54) Baraboo, Wisconsin, U.S.

Career information
- High school: Highland (Medina, Ohio)
- College: Northwestern University (BS); Massachusetts Institute of Technology (MBA)

Career highlights
- NBA Executive of the Year (2018)

Daryl Morey (born September 14, 1972) is an American basketball executive who most recently served as the president of basketball operations of the Philadelphia 76ers of the National Basketball Association (NBA). His basketball philosophy, heavily reliant on analytics, favors three-point field goals and layups over mid-range jumpers. This style has been dubbed "Moreyball", as a nod towards Michael Lewis's Moneyball. Morey also co-established the MIT Sloan Sports Analytics Conference.

During his tenure as general manager for the Houston Rockets from 2007 to 2020, the team posted the second-most wins in the NBA—behind only the San Antonio Spurs. Following the trade that brought James Harden to the Rockets, the team posted the third-best record, behind only the Spurs and the Golden State Warriors during Harden's tenure on the team. Morey was named NBA Executive of the Year for the 2017–18 NBA season. Morey's "Wins over .500" record for his 17-year career ranks 5th among all executives in NBA history. However, his teams have never won a championship.

In 2019, Morey's Twitter post in support of the 2019–2020 Hong Kong protests resulted in suspension/termination of all mainland Chinese sponsors of the NBA and criticism of the NBA's handling of the controversy. He resigned from the Rockets and joined the 76ers in 2020. After the 76ers lost to the New York Knicks in the 2nd round of the 2026 NBA playoffs, Morey parted ways with the 76ers.

== Early life and education ==
Morey was born on September 14, 1972, in Baraboo, Wisconsin. He graduated from Highland High School near Medina, Ohio before receiving a bachelor's degree in computer science with an emphasis on statistics from Northwestern University in 1996, as well as an MBA from the MIT Sloan School of Management.

== Career ==
=== STATS, Inc. ===
Morey began his career in 1992 with STATS, Inc., a pioneer sports data firm where Bill James also worked. During his time there he was the first to adapt James' Pythagorean expectation to professional basketball. He found that using 13.91 for the exponents provided an acceptable model for predicting won-lost percentages:

$$\mathrm{Win} = \frac{\text{points for}^{13.91}}{\text{points for}^{13.91} + \text{points against}^{13.91}}.$$

Morey's "Modified Pythagorean Theorem" was first published in STATS Basketball Scoreboard, 1993–94.

=== EY-Parthenon ===
In 2000, Morey worked at EY-Parthenon, a leading strategy consulting firm, as a principal consultant with an emphasis on sports.

=== Other ===
Morey is the co-chairperson for the annual MIT Sloan Sports Analytics Conference. He is also an avid Esports supporter, has attended MLG (Major League Gaming) events, and was part owner of Clutch Gaming, the Houston, Texas-based League of Legends Championship Series eSports team. Morey is also passionate about musical theater. He commissioned and produced the basketball themed musical Small Ball, which opened in April 2018 at the Catastrophic Theater in Houston, Texas. In addition, Morey is an avid chess player and has his own chess bot on the website Chess.com.

== Executive career ==
=== Boston Celtics ===
In 2002, Morey left EY-Parthenon to become senior vice president of operations for the Boston Celtics, with responsibility for setting ticket prices and developing analytical methods and technology to enhance basketball decisions related to the draft, trades, free agency, and advance scouting of opponents for the coaching staff.

=== Houston Rockets ===
Then-Houston Rockets owner Leslie Alexander named Morey the team's assistant general manager on April 3, 2006. Morey succeeded Carroll Dawson as general manager on May 10, 2007, following the Moreyball trend of integrating advanced statistical analysis with traditional qualitative scouting and basic statistics. Although several teams had previously hired executives with non-traditional basketball backgrounds, the Rockets were the first NBA team to hire such a general manager. In the fall of 2012, he and the Rockets acquired now-All-Star and 2017-18 league MVP James Harden via trade from the Oklahoma City Thunder. During Morey's tenure, the Rockets did not have a losing record and advanced to the playoffs 9 times, including to the Western Conference Finals in 2015 and 2018. He was also named the NBA Executive of the Year in 2018.

On October 15, 2020, the Rockets announced that Morey would step down as general manager on November 1. He confirmed his departure in a full-page ad in the Houston Chronicle on October 18. After Morey's departure, the Rockets would embark on a rebuild by trading away Russell Westbrook and James Harden.

=== Philadelphia 76ers ===
On November 2, 2020, the Philadelphia 76ers named Morey as president of basketball operations.

On March 22, 2021, Morey said "3-pointers should be worth 2.5 points" and the court should be widened to make corner 3-pointers longer.

On February 10, 2022, Morey orchestrated a trade that sent Ben Simmons to the Nets and brought in James Harden. Morey reunited with James Harden, his franchise point guard during both of their tenures with the Houston Rockets.

On March 13, 2025, Morey revealed on Pablo Torre's podcast called "Pablo Torre Finds Out" that Morey and the 76ers did use AI to help make key team decisions and moves during the season. This led to derision by current and former players regarding the team and Morey's situation there. On May 12, 2026, shortly after their playoff elimination, a report revealed the 76ers were parting ways with Morey.

== Personal life ==
Morey is an avid chess player, who as of February 2024, was rated 1700 on Chess.com. He has also been featured as a chess bot on the website. He also plays the Civilization video game series, which he once brought up when responding to a question about the best video game of all time.

== Media ==
=== The Undoing Project ===
Author of Moneyball, Michael Lewis, chose Daryl Morey as the new nerd-hero at the center of his 2016 book, The Undoing Project. Whereas Moneyball highlighted the plight and success of Billy Beane as GM of the Oakland Athletics in 2003, The Undoing Project reveals Daryl Morey as the underdog king of basketball, making use of a similar analytical method to acquire undervalued talent as Beane did with the A's to produce a forceful team. Lewis uses Morey as a real-world example of one who has exemplified ideas introduced by Daniel Kahneman and Amos Tversky, two Israeli psychologists whose work pioneered the field of behavioral economics. The psychologist duo defined a simple, two-part distinction of the way the brain makes decisions: System 1 and System 2. A more intuitive, subjective, fast, and efficient process, System 1 represents the brain's capacity to make split-second choices, often using personal experience to guide decision-making. System 2, however, characterizes a slower, more analytical process of reasoning to reach a conclusion. Michael Lewis points out in The Undoing Project how Daryl Morey observed basketball experts of the time making awfully subjective assessments in looking at basketball players. Shifting the Rockets' scouting strategy to look at hard data over simple observations, Morey implemented a more System-2-based approach to the team's hiring practices. This strategy is thought to be critically linked to the Houston Rockets' recent success.

=== Twitter comments on Hong Kong ===
On October 4, 2019, Morey tweeted in support of the 2019–2020 Hong Kong protests, drawing criticism from Rockets owner Tilman Fertitta, who said that while Morey was the best general manager in the NBA, the Rockets were not a political organization. The tweet was Morey's first public expression of political views. Morey later deleted the tweet. In mainland China, where the Rockets have an extensive relationship after the selection of Yao Ming in 2002, Morey's tweet resulted in the Chinese Basketball Association's suspension of its relationship with the Rockets and the issuance of a statement of dissatisfaction from the consular office of the People's Republic of China (PRC) in Houston. All Houston Rockets-related items were removed from the Tmall and JD.com sites and the team's games were removed from broadcasting on Tencent. The Associated Press said that the reactions underscored Beijing's sensitivity about foreign attitudes toward the protests.

At the time of the tweet, Morey and the Rockets were in Tokyo for the NBA's Japan Games. He remained isolated in his room at the hotel and only engaged with Toronto Raptors president Masai Ujiri upon the fallout. According to Ujiri, Morey said that the timing of his tweet was in response to a new law in Hong Kong prohibiting protesters from wearing masks and that himself and his friends had discussed political autonomy in Hong Kong since attending MIT Sloan.

A few days later, Morey and the NBA each issued a separate statement addressing the original tweet, with Morey saying that he never intended his tweet to cause any offense and the NBA saying that it was regrettable. The statements were criticized by US politicians and third-party observers for the perceived exercise of economic statecraft by the PRC and insufficiency of the NBA's defense of Morey's tweet. A bipartisan letter by Alexandria Ocasio-Cortez, Ted Cruz, and six other lawmakers fiercely criticized the NBA's handling of the controversy. The lawmakers wrote that the NBA's response not only "sold out an American citizen" but also "reinforces the Chinese Communist Party view that those who point to Chinese repression in Hong Kong are at best stating opinions, not facts", as well as being "a betrayal of fundamental American values". Critics also contrasted the league's disparate response to Morey's tweet with its history of political activism and compared the incident to an October 2 South Park episode "Band in China" which parodies the self-censorship of the American entertainment industry to meet PRC censorship demands. The statements also drew criticism from PRC state-run media for their perceived insufficiency, as Morey himself did not apologize.

NBA commissioner Adam Silver later defended the league's response to the tweet, supporting Morey's right to freedom of expression while also accepting the right of reply from the government of and businesses from mainland China. Further fallout from the tweet included the decision by China Central Television to cancel the broadcasting of two NBA preseason games, pro-Hong Kong protest demonstrations held at preseason games in the United States involving teams from the Chinese Basketball Association, the cancellation of NBA Cares community events in Shanghai, criticism by then-president Donald Trump of the perceived double standards by the reactions of specific coaches to NBA response relative to their past criticisms of his policies, and the suspension/termination of all mainland Chinese sponsors of the NBA. A Fox Business article said that the NBA would look to Africa and India for growth if the league were to sever ties with mainland China as a result of the tweet.
