= True shooting percentage =

Basketball statistic

In basketball, true shooting percentage is an advanced statistic that measures a player's efficiency at shooting the ball. It is intended to more accurately calculate a player's shooting than field goal percentage, free throw percentage, and three-point field goal percentage taken individually. Two- and three-point field goals and free throws are all considered in its calculation. It is abbreviated TS%. It is considered the gold standard for measuring scoring efficiency in basketball.

In the National Basketball Association, it is calculated by: $TS\% = \frac{PTS}{ 2(FGA + 0.44 \times FTA)}$

where:

- PTS = points scored,
- FGA = field goal attempts,
- FTA = free throw attempts

== National Basketball Association ==
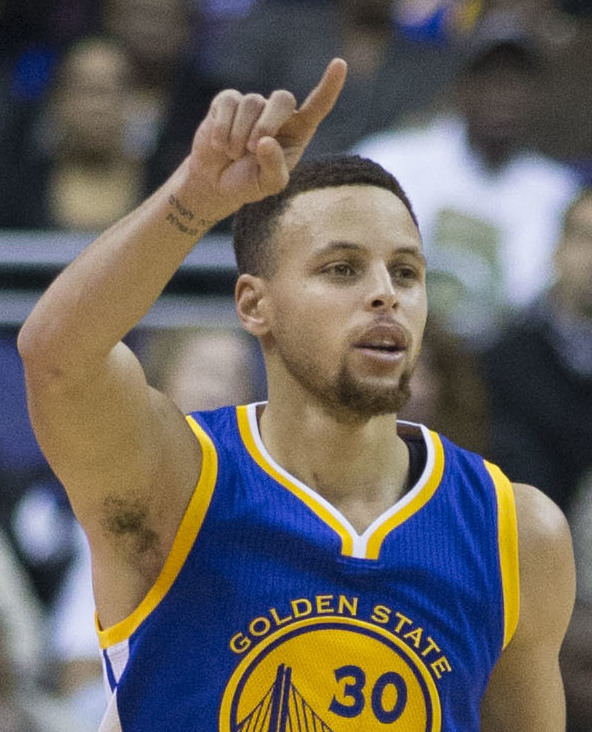
Stephen Curry

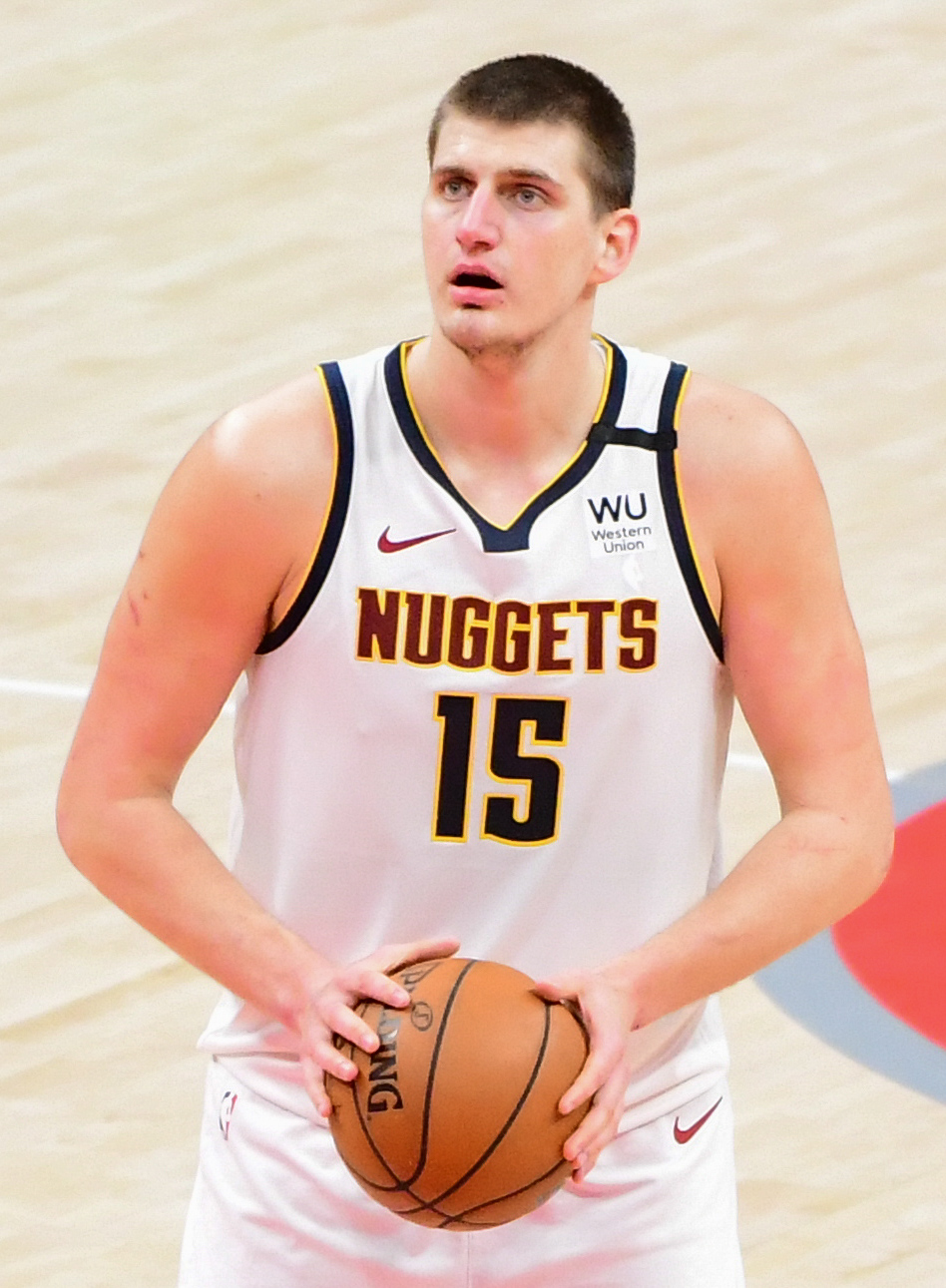
Nikola Jokic

Several players in the National Basketball Association (NBA) record consistently high TS%, demonstrating their ability to efficiently score points for their teams. Stephen Curry of the Golden State Warriors and Kevin Durant of the Houston Rockets have career true shooting percentages of 62.6% and 62.2%, respectively, making them two of the most efficient scorers in NBA history. Higher still is the true shooting percentage of Nikola Jokic, which stands at 64.1%.

In addition, big men like Clint Capela of the Houston Rockets have also posted high TS% due to their ability to score efficiently around the basket and draw free throws at a high rate. The highest true shooting percentage in NBA history belongs to Rudy Gobert, who has a true shooting percentage of 67.2% for his career. This is closely followed by Jarrett Allen and his true shooting percentage of 67.0%.

In the WNBA, Sylvia Fowles and Jonquel Jones have recorded career true shooting percentages of 63.6% and 61.7% respectively.

== Leaders ==
In the National Basketball Association (NBA), the statistic is available for seasons since the 1946–47 season. The highest career true shooting percentage is .6723 by Rudy Gobert. The highest true shooting percentage for one season is .7324, by Rudy Gobert which he achieved during the 2021–22 season. Artis Gilmore has led the league in true shooting percentage a record five times. Charles Barkley led the league four times. Wilt Chamberlain, Tyson Chandler, Rudy Gobert, Ken Sears, and John Stockton each led the league three times. Alex Groza, Arnie Johnson, Bailey Howell, Cedric Maxwell, Dave Twardzik, Ed Macauley, Jerry Lucas, Jerry West, Johnny Green, Kyle Korver, Neil Johnston, Nenê, Reggie Miller, Stephen Curry, and Steve Nash each lead the league two times. Artis Gilmore also holds the record for consecutive seasons leading the league in true shooting percentage (5x). Other players to lead the league in true shooting percentage include Charles Barkley (4x), Tyson Chandler, Ken Sears each did it (3x), Alex Groza, Cedric Maxwell, Dave Twardzik, Ed Macauley, Johnny Green, Kyle Korver, Neil Johnston, Nenê, and Steve Nash each did it (2x).

=== Year-by-year ===
^	Denotes player who is still active in the NBA
*	Inducted into the Naismith Memorial Basketball Hall of Fame

Season	Player	Position	True shooting percentage	Team
1946–47	Bob Feerick	Forward / guard	.4529	Washington Capitols
1947–48	Buddy Jeannette*	Guard	.4539	Baltimore Bullets
1948–49	Arnie Johnson	Small forward	.5110	Rochester Royals
1949–50	Alex Groza	Center	.5483	Indianapolis Olympians
1950–51	Alex Groza (2)	Center	.5517	Indianapolis Olympians
1951–52	Arnie Johnson (2)	Small forward	.5651	Rochester Royals
1952–53	Ed Macauley*	Center / power forward	.5432	Boston Celtics
1953–54	Ed Macauley* (2)	Center / power forward	.5629	Boston Celtics
1954–55	Larry Foust	Power forward / center	.5696	Fort Wayne Pistons
1955–56	Neil Johnston*	Center	.5551	Philadelphia Warriors
1956–57	Neil Johnston* (2)	Center	.5438	Philadelphia Warriors
1957–58	Ken Sears	Power forward / small forward	.5342	New York Knicks
1958–59	Ken Sears (2)	Power forward / small forward	.5901	New York Knicks
1959–60	Ken Sears (3)	Power forward / small forward	.5669	New York Knicks
1960–61	Oscar Robertson*	Point guard	.5553	Cincinnati Royals
1961–62	Walt Bellamy*	Center	.5544	Chicago Packers
1962–63	Bailey Howell*	Small forward / power forward	.5894	Detroit Pistons
1963–64	Jerry Lucas*	Power forward	.5785	Cincinnati Royals
1964–65	Bailey Howell* (2)	Small forward / power forward	.5825	Baltimore Bullets
1965–66	Jerry West*	Point guard	.5729	Los Angeles Lakers
1966–67	Wilt Chamberlain*	Center	.6371	Philadelphia 76ers
1967–68	Jerry West* (2)	Point guard	.5900	Los Angeles Lakers
1968–69	Jerry Lucas* (2)	Power forward	.5896	Cincinnati Royals
1969–70	Johnny Green	Power forward	.5797	Cincinnati Royals
1970–71	Johnny Green (2)	Power forward	.6067	Cincinnati Royals
1971–72	Wilt Chamberlain* (2)	Center	.6098	Los Angeles Lakers
1972–73	Wilt Chamberlain* (3)	Center	.6894	Los Angeles Lakers
1973–74	Bob McAdoo*	Center	.5945	Buffalo Braves
1974–75	Don Nelson	Small forward	.5995	Boston Celtics
1975–76	John Shumate	Power forward / center	.5956	Phoenix Suns
1976–77	Dave Twardzik	Point guard	.6892	Portland Trail Blazers
1977–78	Dave Twardzik (2)	Point guard	.6514	Portland Trail Blazers
1978–79	Cedric Maxwell	Small forward	.6758	Boston Celtics
1979–80	Cedric Maxwell (2)	Small forward	.6792	Boston Celtics
1980–81	Artis Gilmore*	Center	.6995	Chicago Bulls
1981–82	Artis Gilmore* (2)	Center	.7024	Chicago Bulls
1982–83	Artis Gilmore* (3)	Center	.6685	San Antonio Spurs
1983–84	Artis Gilmore* (4)	Center	.6748	San Antonio Spurs
1984–85	Artis Gilmore* (5)	Center	.6800	San Antonio Spurs
1985–86	Darryl Dawkins	Center	.6804	New Jersey Nets
1986–87	Charles Barkley*	Power forward / small forward	.6598	Philadelphia 76ers
1987–88	Charles Barkley* (2)	Power forward / small forward	.6653	Philadelphia 76ers
1988–89	Charles Barkley* (3)	Power forward / small forward	.6531	Philadelphia 76ers
1989–90	Charles Barkley* (4)	Power forward / small forward	.6611	Philadelphia 76ers
1990–91	Reggie Miller*	Shooting guard	.6495	Indiana Pacers
1991–92	Buck Williams	Power forward	.6511	Portland Trail Blazers
1992–93	Brad Daugherty	Center	.6350	Cleveland Cavaliers
1993–94	Reggie Miller* (2)	Shooting guard	.6360	Indiana Pacers
1994–95	John Stockton*	Point guard	.6514	Utah Jazz
1995–96	Tim Legler	Shooting guard	.6884	Washington Bullets / Wizards
1996–97	Mario Elie	Shooting guard / small forward	.6619	Houston Rockets
1997–98	John Stockton* (2)	Point guard	.6284	Utah Jazz
1998–99	Chris Mullin*	Small forward / shooting guard	.6161	Indiana Pacers
1999–2000	Dikembe Mutombo*	Center	.6212	Atlanta Hawks
2000–01	John Stockton* (3)	Point guard	.6104	Utah Jazz
2001–02	Brent Barry	shooting guard	.6518	Seattle SuperSonics
2002–03	Eddy Curry	Center	.6070	Chicago Bulls
2003–04	Brian Cardinal	Power forward	.6262	Golden State Warriors
2004–05	Damon Jones	Point guard / shooting guard	.6251	Miami Heat
2005–06	Steve Nash*	Point guard	.6316	Phoenix Suns
2006–07	Steve Nash* (2)	Point guard	.6539	Phoenix Suns
2007–08	Amar'e Stoudemire	Power forward / center	.6564	Phoenix Suns
2008–09	Nenê	Center / power forward	.6447	Denver Nuggets
2009–10	Nenê (2)	Center / power forward	.6305	Denver Nuggets
2010–11	Tyson Chandler	Center	.6967	Dallas Mavericks
2011–12	Tyson Chandler (2)	Center	.7081	New York Knicks
2012–13	Tyson Chandler (3)	Center	.6709	New York Knicks
2013–14	Kyle Korver	Shooting guard / small forward	.6535	Atlanta Hawks
2014–15	Kyle Korver (2)	Shooting guard / small forward	.6535	Atlanta Hawks
2015–16	Stephen Curry^	Point guard	.6694	Golden State Warriors
2016–17	Rudy Gobert^	Center	.6813	Utah Jazz
2017–18	Stephen Curry^ (2)	Point guard	.6751	Golden State Warriors
2018–19	Rudy Gobert^ (2)	Center	.6818	Utah Jazz
2019–20	Mitchell Robinson^	Center	.7264	New York Knicks
2020–21	Ivica Zubac^	center	.6926	Los Angeles Clippers
2021–22	Rudy Gobert^ (3)	Center	.7324	Utah Jazz
2022–23	Nikola Jokić^	Center	.7015	Denver Nuggets
2023–24	Daniel Gafford^	Center	.7307	Washington Wizards; Dallas Mavericks
2024–25	Jarrett Allen^	Center	.7239	Cleveland Cavaliers
2025–26	Jalen Duren^	Center	.6879	Detroit Pistons

== Multiple-time leaders ==
Rank	Player	Team	Times leader	Years
1	Artis Gilmore	Chicago Bulls (2) / San Antonio Spurs (3)	5	1981, 1982, 1983, 1984, 1984–85
2	Charles Barkley	Philadelphia 76ers	4	1986–87, 1987–88, 1988–89, 1989–90
3	Wilt Chamberlain	Philadelphia 76ers (1) / Los Angeles Lakers (2)	3	1966–67, 1972, 1973
3	Tyson Chandler	Dallas Mavericks (1) / New York Knicks (2)	3	2010–11, 2011–12, 2012–13
3	Rudy Gobert	Utah Jazz	3	2016–17, 2018–19, 2021–22
3	Ken Sears	New York Knicks	3	1957–58, 1959, 1960
3	John Stockton	Utah Jazz	3	1994–95, 1997–98, 2000–01
8	Alex Groza	Indianapolis Olympians	2	1950, 1951
8	Arnie Johnson	Rochester Royals	2	1948–49, 1951–52
8	Bailey Howell	Detroit Pistons (1) / Baltimore Bullets (1)	2	1962–63, 1964–65
8	Cedric Maxwell	Boston Celtics	2	1979, 1980
8	Dave Twardzik	Portland Trail Blazers	2	1976–77, 1977–78
8	Ed Macauley	Boston Celtics	2	1952–53, 1953–54
8	Jerry Lucas	Cincinnati Royals	2	1963–64, 1968–69
8	Jerry West	Los Angeles Lakers	2	1965–66, 1967–68
8	Johnny Green	Cincinnati Royals	2	1970, 1971
8	Kyle Korver	Atlanta Hawks	2	2013–14, 2014–15
8	Neil Johnston	Philadelphia Warriors	2	1956, 1957
8	Nenê	Denver Nuggets	2	2008–09, 2009–10
8	Reggie Miller	Indiana Pacers	2	1990–91, 1993–94
8	Stephen Curry	Golden State Warriors	2	2015–16, 2017–18
8	Steve Nash	Phoenix Suns	2	2005–06, 2006–07

== See also ==
- NBA records
- Basketball statistics
- Advanced statistics in basketball
