= Timothy Groseclose =

American academic (born 1964)

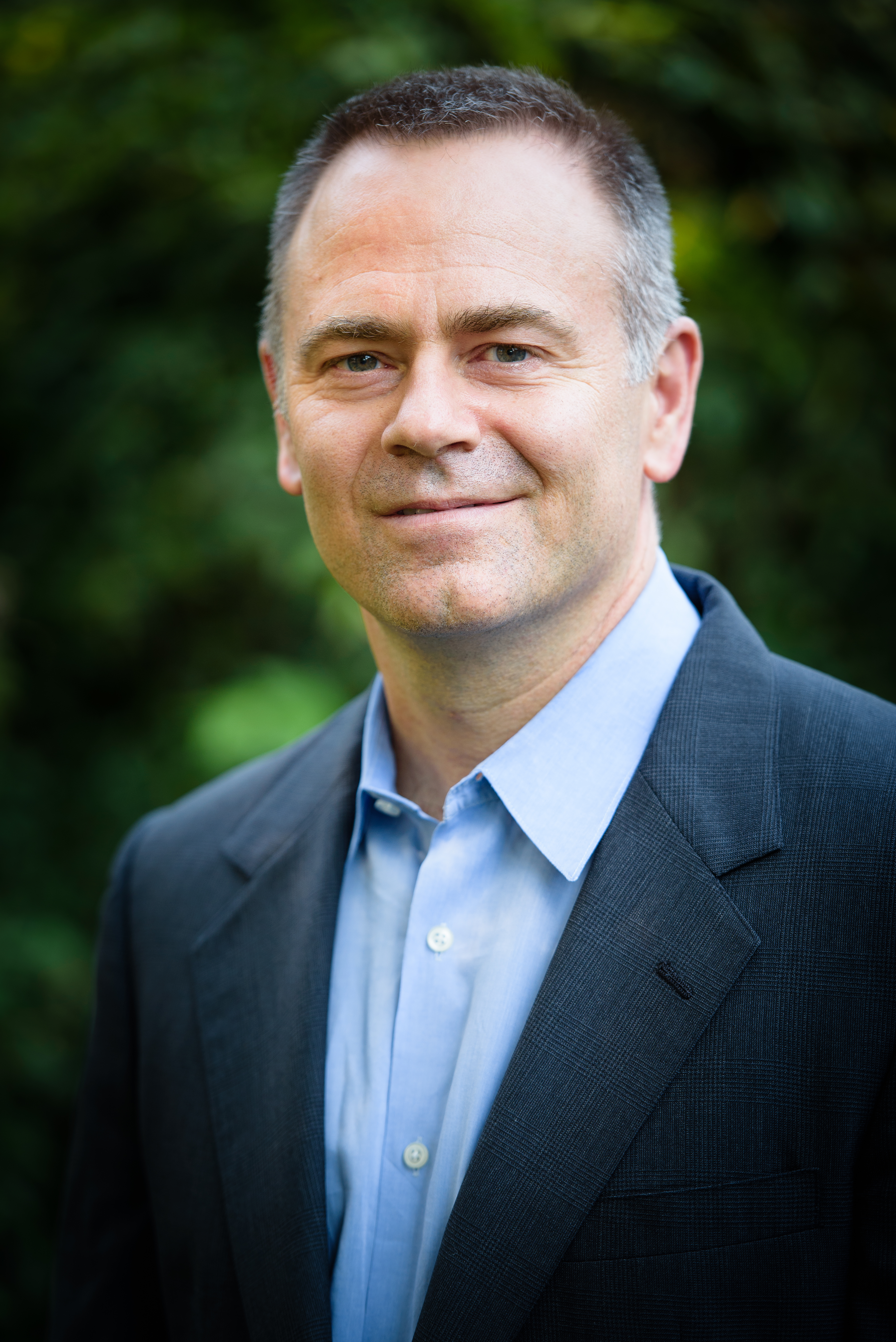
- Born: Timothy Jay Groseclose; September 22, 1964 (age 61); Tulsa, Oklahoma, U.S.
- Education: Stanford University
- Occupation: Economist
- Employer: George Mason University
- Spouse: Victoria Groseclose (née DeGuzman)
- Children: 2
- Relatives: Elgin Groseclose

Timothy Jay Groseclose (born September 22, 1964) is an American academic. He is Professor of Economics at George Mason University, where he holds the Adam Smith Chair at the Mercatus Center.

== Early life ==
Timothy Groseclose was born on September 22, 1964, in Tulsa, Oklahoma.

He was graduated from Lakeside High School in Hot Springs, Arkansas in 1983. He graduated from Stanford University, where he received a Bachelor of Science degree in mathematical and computational sciences in 1987. He received a PhD in Political Economics from the Stanford Graduate School of Business in 1992.

== Academic career ==
Groseclose started his academic career as assistant professor of political science and political economy at Carnegie Mellon University from 1992 to 1995. He served as assistant professor of political science at Ohio State University from 1996 to 1998.

Groseclose became a tenured associate professor of political economy at his alma mater, the Stanford Graduate School of Business, in 1998, where he taught until 2003. He was then associate professor of political science at the University of California, Los Angeles (UCLA) from 2003 to 2005, and became full professor in 2005. In 2006, he also became professor of economics at UCLA. He later served as the Marvin Hoffenberg Professor of American Politics at UCLA. However, he felt ostracized as a conservative faculty member, and decided to resign.

Groseclose is professor at George Mason University, where he holds the Adam Smith Chair at the Mercatus Center.

== Research on American media liberal bias ==
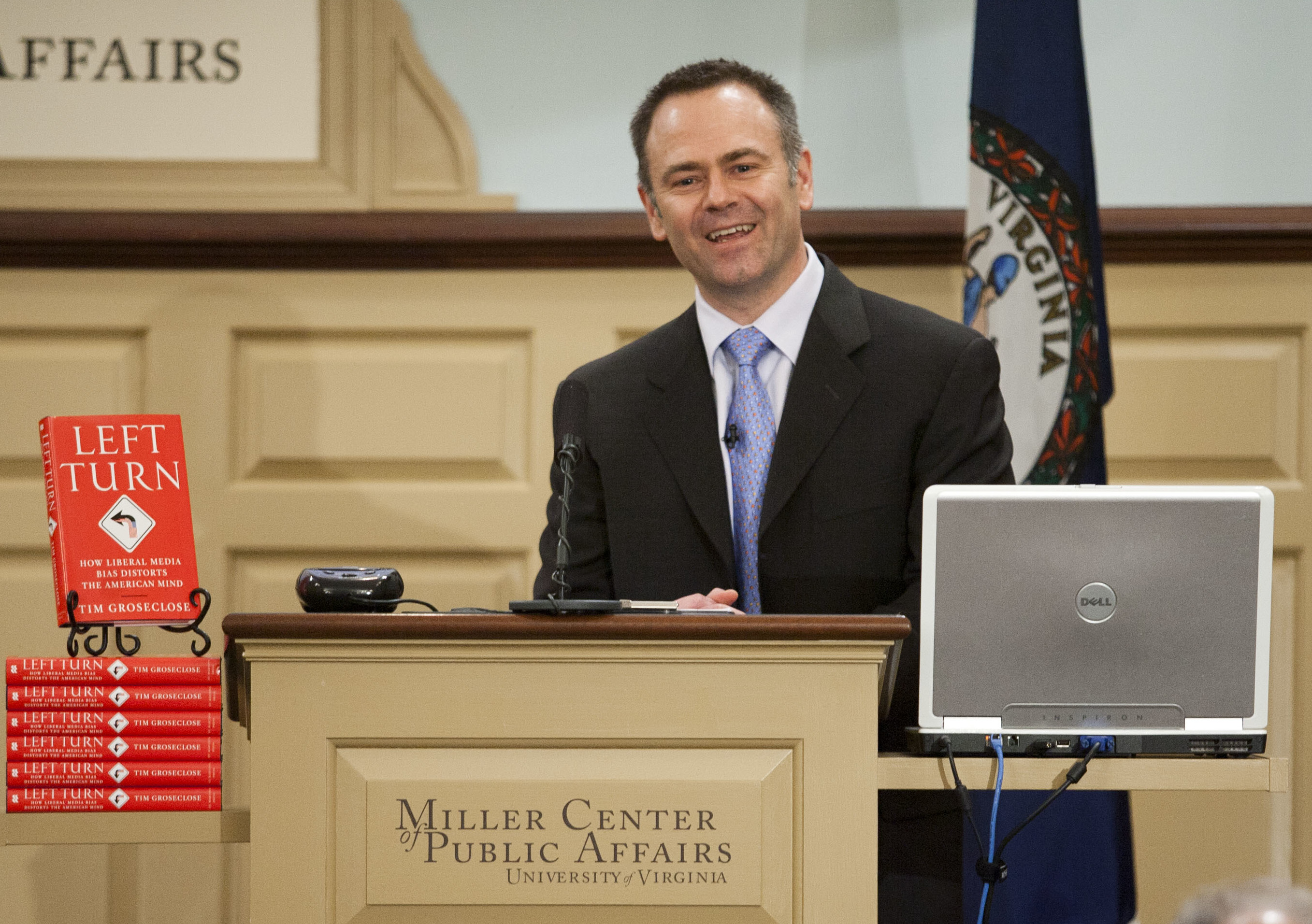
Tim Groseclose speaking at the Miller Center

In 2005, Groseclose co-authored an article with Jeffrey Milyo, a professor of economics at the University of Missouri, in the Quarterly Journal of Economics, entitled "A Measure of Media Bias". The article suggested the American media had a liberal bias. Drawing upon this article, Groseclose published "Left Turn: How Liberal Media Bias Distorts the American Mind" in 2012. The book suggests that all media outlets in the United States are left-leaning. He adds that conservative media outlets like Fox News and the Drudge Report are only moderately conservative. Furthermore, he goes on to argue that the left-wing media bias influences American voters to lean left. If it were not for media bias, he claims that the US would think and vote like a solid red state, such as Texas or Kentucky. He also suggests that Republican candidate John McCain would have won the 2008 United States presidential election.

In a review for The Washington Times, L. Brent Bozell III, the president of the Media Research Center, praised Groseclose's "fierce intellectual honesty," explaining, "He makes no bones about his own political biases." Brozell also praised Groseclose's willingness to accept peer review, even from liberal critics. However, he was critical of the preponderance of "quantitative mathematical formulations" at the expense of "qualitative analysis." Similarly, he dismissed Groseclose's use of "statistical jargon" as "pure mumbo-jumbo that the layman just must accept." Meanwhile, in the Huffington Post, Terry Krepel suggested Groseclose was "more interested in trying to forward a conservative agenda than objective research." He also criticized the "lack of attention to detail in Groseclose's book that raises questions about his larger conclusions." In addition, GMU Economics professor and co-author of the Marginal Revolution blog, Tyler Cowen, stated, “This book serves up the most convincing evidence for media bias I have seen, ever. Tim Groseclose is the leading academic scholar in the area, but this is a smartly-written book which every person can read for enlightenment and also for pleasure.” Furthermore, Steven Levitt, professor of economics at the University of Chicago and co-author of Freakoconomics took the position that, “I'm no conservative, but I loved Left Turn. Tim Groseclose has written the best kind of book: one that is firmly anchored in rigorous academic research, but is still so much fun to read that it is hard to put down. Liberals will not like the conclusions of this book, which in my opinion, is all the more reason why they should want to read it.”

Others have not been as favorably inclined towards the methodology of the measure. Brendan Nyhan, an assistant professor in the Department of Government at Dartmouth College argues that left and center-left think-tanks have more credentialed experts with peer-reviewed publications than conservatives, which may result in a greater number of citations by the press, which seeks out expert perspectives on the news, but not more citations by members of Congress, who generally seek out views that reinforce their own.

Gasper (2011) shows that the estimates are sensitive to the time period under examination and that removing a single think tank shifts estimates dramatically. Additionally, the estimates of media bias do not comport with more direct measures of media bias derived from computational text analysis or sometimes face validity.

== Personal life ==
Groseclose is married to Victoria Groseclose (née DeGuzman). They have two children.

== Bibliography ==
- Left Turn: How Liberal Media Bias Distorts the American Mind (New York City: St. Martin's Press, 2012).
- Cheating: An Insider's Report on the Use of Race in Admissions at UCLA (Dog Ear Publishing, 2014).
