= Advanced statistics in basketball =

Advanced statistics, also known as analytics or APBRmetrics, in basketball refers to the analysis of basketball statistics using objective evidence. APBRmetrics takes its name from the acronym APBR, which stands for the Association for Professional Basketball Research. According to The Sporting News, the APBRmetrics message board was "the birthplace of basketball analytics".

Advanced basketball statistics include effective field goal percentage (eFG%), true shooting percentage (TS%), on-court/off-court plus–minus, adjusted plus-minus (APM), real plus/minus (RPM), player efficiency rating (PER), offense efficiency rating, offensive rating, defensive rating, similarity score, tendex, and player tracking. A more complete explanation of basketball analytics is available in "A Starting Point for Analyzing Basketball Statistics" in the Journal of Quantitative Analysis in Sports.

== Common metrics ==
- Player Efficiency Rating (PER) was developed by John Hollinger and 'sums up all a player's positive accomplishments, subtracts the negative accomplishments, and returns a per-minute rating of a player's performance.'
- Steal Percentage is the percentage of estimated opponent possessions that end with a steal by the player while the player is on the court.

== Notable basketball analytics practitioners ==
The field of basketball analytics practitioners includes, but is not limited to, the following individuals:

- Martin Manley wrote Basketball Heaven. Created Player Efficiency metric and many other advanced metrics.
- John Hollinger authored four books in the Pro Basketball Forecast/Prospectus series and was a regular columnist for ESPN Insider. He is a former vice president of basketball operations for the Memphis Grizzlies.
- Justin Kubatko created and maintained the website Basketball-Reference.com, the professional basketball arm of Sports Reference LLC, until 2013. During Kubatko's tenure, Sports Reference was named one of the 50 best websites of 2010 by Time magazine.
- Dean Oliver, "one of the godfathers of NBA analytics", is a former NCAA Division III player and assistant coach at Caltech. He is also a scout who has consulted with the Seattle SuperSonics, and served in the front office of the Denver Nuggets and the Sacramento Kings.

== See also ==
- NBA records
- Network Science Based Basketball Analytics
- Basketball statistics
