= Offense efficiency rating =

Basketball term

In basketball statistics, Offensive Efficiency Rating (OER) is the average number of points scored by a basketball player per shot taken.

This includes missed field goals as well as free throws. The statistic stems from the previously created Player Efficiency Rating (PER). The per-minute rating was created by John Hollinger. Hollinger states, "The PER sums up all a player's positive accomplishments, subtracts the negative accomplishments, and returns a per-minute rating of a player's performance."

== See also ==
- NBA records
- Advanced statistics in basketball
- Basketball statistics
- Offensive rating
