= Jeffrey Milyo =

Professor of economics

Academic background
- Education: University of Connecticut; Stanford University
- Doctoral advisor: Roger Noll

Academic work
- Discipline: Political economy Law and economics
- Institutions: University of Missouri
- Website: Information at IDEAS / RePEc

Jeffrey Dennis Milyo is an American economist and professor of economics at the University of Missouri. He is also a senior fellow at the Cato Institute. One of his best-known studies is a 2005 one that he co-authored with Timothy Groseclose examining media bias. The study concluded that most major media outlets in the United States have a liberal bias, although its methodology has been criticized. He has also researched the political effects of campaign finance laws in the United States.
