= Muthu Alagappan =

Basketball analyst

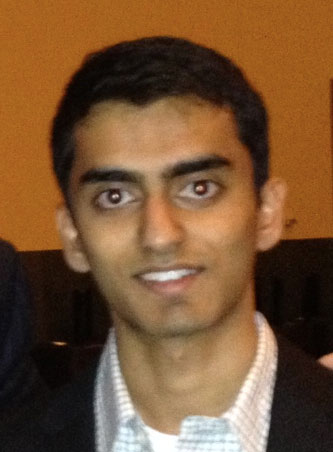
- Muthu Alagappan at the 2012 MIT Sloan Sports Analytics Conference
- Born: 1989 or 1990 (age 36–37); Crewe, England
- Occupation: Resident physician
- Known for: Basketball statistical analysis

Muthu Alagappan (born c. 1990) is a former medical resident known for his professional basketball analytics. He was born in England and raised in Texas. During college at Stanford University, he began an internship at big data startup company Ayasdi, where he used their software on basketball statistics to determine 13 distinct positions of play. After he spoke at the 2012 MIT Sloan Sports Analytics Conference, several professional teams began to use the company's software. He was given the top prize at the conference, and GQ called his work both "a new frontier for the NBA" and "Muthuball"—an allusion to Moneyball baseball statistical analysis known for revolutionizing the sport. Forbes included him in their 2012 and 2013 "30 Under 30" list of influential people in the sports industry. His work has received mention in The New York Times, ESPN, The Wall Street Journal, Wired, and Slate.

== Early life ==
Alagappan was born in Crewe, England, and raised in Houston, Texas, US. He is of Tamil heritage. He graduated from Stanford University in 2012 with a degree in biomechanical engineering and the Stanford Medical School in 2016. As of 2017, he was an internal medicine resident at Beth Israel Deaconess Medical Center. Alagappan is a longtime Houston Rockets fan.

== Basketball analytics ==
Alagappan was hired as an intern with Ayasdi, a big data startup in Palo Alto, California, through Stanford's Mayfield Fellows Program, where he was hired to do sales. He tested the company's software on basketball stats and called the output "the true positions of the NBA". The topological data analysis mapped similarities between NBA players and identified 13 distinct positions of play, as opposed to the traditional five. Those traditional positions, such as power forward and shooting guard, have become ambiguous and outmoded as a result of the increased variety of player styles categorized by them. Alagappan's method groups professional basketball players by statistical strengths and places them into the new positional model.

He started with a collection of seven basic statistics (assists, blocks, fouls, points, rebounds, steals, and turnovers) from Yahoo! Sports on every NBA player from the previous season and adjusted the stats for time in play. The software grouped the players into color-coded nodes and connected them with lines that represented statistical similarities. Alagappan had expected the software to create five groups of nodes by statistical advantages, which would each represent a position of play, but the software instead returned 13 node groups representing 13 mathematically described positions. The assignments compare player statistics and not individual style. Originally unconfident in his results, he explored the data on his own for a week before sharing his findings with his bosses and basketball statisticians including Ken Pomeroy, who replied in encouragement. He then applied and was accepted to speak at the 2012 MIT Sloan Sports Analytics Conference. By May 2012, at least four NBA teams and one MLB team had contacted Ayasdi about using their technology.

The method is intended to change existing basketball team composition paradigms to help NBA teams win championships. Alagappan used Devin Ebanks of the Los Angeles Lakers as an example, whom Alagappan considered promising for his classification as a "scoring rebounder" alongside Carmelo Anthony and Dirk Nowitzki despite a subpar season record. GQ reported that Ebanks would come to fulfill the model's forecast in following games for six weeks when two other players sat out and Ebanks started games. While the model couldn't have predicted Linsanity, when given college basketball stats, it was able to determine three players most similar to Lin in college, of which two were already drafted in the NBA. The forecasting is expected to improve with the growth of the data set.

His data-driven analysis has been well received. He won the top prize in the "Evolution of Sports" category at the 2012 MIT Sloan Sports Analytics Conference. GQ called his work "a new frontier for the NBA" and "Muthuball", an allusion to Billy Beane's "Moneyball" sabermetrics (baseball statistical analysis known for revolutionizing the sport). Forbes included him in their 2012 and 2013 "30 Under 30" lists of influential people in the sports industry. His work has received mention in The New York Times, ESPN, The Wall Street Journal, Wired, and Slate.

Rob Mahoney of The New York Times called the model "a novel execution of a productive thought", but cited the "one-of-a-kind" catch-all position and the substantial number of players categorized within it as weak points. ESPN TrueHoop's Jim Calvan criticized Alagappan's Sloan conference presentation for its lack of data showing how team reconfiguration to cover the 13 positions results in more wins.
