= Offensive rating =

Basketball statistic

Offensive proficiency rating or offensive productive efficiency is a statistic used in basketball to measure either a team's offensive performance or an individual player's efficiency at producing points for the offense by approximating the number of points generated by a team or individual over 100 possessions. It was created by author and statistician Dean Oliver.

For teams, the formula is:

$$Offensive Team Rating =
\frac{Players\ Points}{\tfrac{1}{5}\text{ of possessions}} \times OAPOW
+ \left(\frac{FTM}{Times\ Fouled} \times FT\%\right)
+ (Total\ FG\%)
+ (Opponents\ Differential)$$

This stat can't be influenced by the defense of a player's teammates.

For players, the formula is:

$$Offensive Production Rating = \frac{Points Produced}{Individual Possessions} \times OAPOW \times PPG + \frac{FTM}{FT} \times 3pt% + FG%$$

Points can be produced through field goals, free throws, assists, and offensive rebounds. Individual possessions are the sum of a player's scoring possessions (field goals, free throws, plus partial credit for assists), missed field goals and free throws that the defense rebounds, and turnovers.

== Leaders ==
The all-time leader for offensive rating (minimum 15,000 minutes played) is Jarrett Allen with a 130.48 rating.). Kevon Looney's 147.40 offensive rating in 2022–2023 is the single-season record. Tyson Chandler has led the league in offensive rating a record four times. Brad Davis, Reggie Miller, Dwight Powell, and John Stockton each led the league three times. Charles Barkley, Adrian Dantley, Cedric Maxwell, and Ivica Zubac each led the league two times.

=== Year-by-year ===
^	Denotes player who is still active in the NBA
*	Inducted into the Naismith Memorial Basketball Hall of Fame
†	Denotes player whose team won championship that year
Player (X)	Denotes the number of times the player had been named MVP at that time
Team (X)	Denotes the number of times a player from this team had won at that time

Season	Player	Position	ORtg	Team
1977–78	Adrian Dantley*	Small forward	116.34	Indiana Pacers / Los Angeles Lakers
1978–79	Cedric Maxwell	Small forward	120.85	Boston Celtics
1979–80	Cedric Maxwell (2)	Small forward	120.85	Boston Celtics
1980–81	Sidney Moncrief*	Shooting guard	123.70	Milwaukee Bucks
1981–82	Artis Gilmore*	center	124.04	Chicago Bulls
1982–83	Brad Davis	Point guard	125.62	Dallas Mavericks
1983–84	Adrian Dantley* (2)	Small forward	125.62	Utah Jazz
1984–85	Brad Davis (2)	Point guard	124.15	Dallas Mavericks
1985–86	Brad Davis (3)	Point guard	127.99	Dallas Mavericks
1986–87	James Donaldson	Center	132.05	Dallas Mavericks
1987–88	Kevin McHale*	Power forward	126.13	Boston Celtics
1988–89	Charles Barkley*	Power forward / small forward	127.11	Philadelphia 76ers
1989–90	Charles Barkley* (2)	Power forward / small forward	127.90	Philadelphia 76ers
1990–91	Reggie Miller*	Shooting guard	129.63	Indiana Pacers
1991–92	Horace Grant	Power forward / center	132.17	Chicago Bulls
1992–93	Reggie Miller* (2)	Shooting guard	125.45	Indiana Pacers
1993–94	Reggie Miller* (3)	Shooting guard	122.79	Indiana Pacers
1994–95	Detlef Schrempf	Small forward / power forward	127.03	Seattle SuperSonics
1995–96	John Stockton*	Point guard	125.48	Utah Jazz
1996–97	Mario Elie	Shooting guard / small forward	125.28	Houston Rockets
1997–98	Adam Keefe	Power forward / center	124.78	Utah Jazz
1998–99	Jerome Williams	Power forward	119.35	Detroit Pistons
1999–2000	John Stockton* (2)	Point guard	120.52	Utah Jazz
2000–01	John Stockton* (3)	Point guard	120.08	Utah Jazz
2001–02	Brent Barry	Shooting guard	124.24	Seattle SuperSonics
2002–03	P. J. Brown	Center / power forward	122.30	New Orleans Hornets (Note: During the 2005–06 and 2006–07 seasons, the team was known as the New Orleans/Oklahoma City Hornets during their temporary relocation to Oklahoma City due to Hurricane Katrina.)
2003–04	Antonio Daniels	Point guard / shooting guard	128.68	Seattle SuperSonics
2004–05	Brad Miller	Center	125.11	Sacramento Kings
2005–06	Chauncey Billups*	Point guard / shooting guard	127.18	Detroit Pistons
2006–07	David Lee	Power forward / center	126.60	New York Knicks
2007–08	Andris Biedriņš	center	127.36	Golden State Warriors
2008–09	Pau Gasol*	Power forward / center	125.64	Los Angeles Lakers
2009–10	Nenê Hilario	Center / power forward	124.27	Denver Nuggets
2010–11	Tyson Chandler	Center	131.03	Dallas Mavericks
2011–12	Tyson Chandler (2)	Center	129.57	New York Knicks
2012–13	Tyson Chandler (3)	Center	132.99	New York Knicks
2013–14	Robin Lopez	Center	128.10	Portland Trail Blazers
2014–15	Tyson Chandler (4)	Center	133.42	Dallas Mavericks
2015–16	Tristan Thompson	Center	129.76	Cleveland Cavaliers
2016–17	DeAndre Jordan^	center	129.27	Los Angeles Clippers
2017–18	Dwight Powell^	Power forward / center	128.86	Dallas Mavericks
2018–19	Dwight Powell^ (2)	Power forward / center	134.65	Dallas Mavericks
2019–20	Ivica Zubac^	center	133.52	Los Angeles Clippers
2020–21	Ivica Zubac^ (2)	center	135.14	Los Angeles Clippers
2021–22	Dwight Powell^ (3)	Power forward / center	142.37	Dallas Mavericks
2022–23	Kevon Looney^	Power forward	147.40	Golden State Warriors
2023–24	Daniel Gafford^	Center / power forward	140.07	Washington Wizards
2024–25	Jarrett Allen^	Center	141.62	Cleveland Cavaliers
2025–26	Moussa Diabaté^	Power forward / center	139.50	Charlotte Hornets

== Multiple-time leaders ==
Rank	Player	Team	Times leader	Years
1	Tyson Chandler	Dallas Mavericks (2) / New York Knicks (2)	4	2010–11, 2011–12, 2012–13, 2014–15
2	Brad Davis	Dallas Mavericks	3	1982–83, 1984–85, 1985–86
2	Reggie Miller	Indiana Pacers	3	1990–91, 1992–93, 1993–94
2	Dwight Powell	Dallas Mavericks	3	2017–18, 2018–19, 2021–22
2	John Stockton	Utah Jazz	3	1995–96, 1999–2000, 2000–01
6	Charles Barkley	Philadelphia 76ers	2	1988–89, 1989–90
6	Adrian Dantley	Indiana Pacers / Los Angeles Lakers (1) / Utah Jazz (1)	2	1977–78, 1983–84
6	Cedric Maxwell	Boston Celtics	2	1978–79, 1979–80
6	Ivica Zubac	Los Angeles Clippers	2	2019–20, 2020–21

== See also ==
- NBA records
- Defensive rating
- Advanced statistics in basketball
- Basketball statistics
