= Player tracking (NBA) =

Technology to track players in the NBA

Player tracking refers to technologies used to track players and the ball (if applicable) in various sports. The National Basketball Association (NBA) first tracked all games at the start of the 2013-14 NBA season. Second Spectrum is the current Official Optical Tracking Provider of the NBA and began league-wide tracking in the 2017-18 NBA season, replacing STATS SportVU which previously held the league-wide contract.

== Technology ==
The NBA (via Second Spectrum) uses an optical tracking system that leverages multiple cameras placed in the catwalks in all 30 NBA arenas. The cameras receive and update data at a rate of 25 frames per second. The cameras feed the data into proprietary software, where computer vision algorithms extract positional data for all players on the court and the ball.

== Statistics ==
The NBA provides a variety of statistics to the public based on the data produced by player tracking to the public on its website. This includes information for players covering categories such as drives, defensive impact, catch and shoot, passing, touches, pull up shooting, rebounding, shooting efficiency, speed, and post ups among others. Similar information is available for teams.

In addition, more sophisticated and detailed tools are available to teams and broadcasters that are not currently available to the public.

Player tracking systems introduce many new statistics, automate the collection of data and provide precision which would be impossible without the use of camera technology and tracking software.

Statistics collected, and available to view during the game and throughout the season include (all statistics are per player):

- Speed and Distance - the speed, distance covered, average speed and distance travelled per game.
- Touches/possession - touches per game, points per touch (PTS per touch) and total touches.
- Passing - passes per game, points created by assist per game, total assists.
- Defensive impact (this stat tracks blocks, steals and "defending the basket" defined as "a defender within 5 feet of the basket and 5 feet of the shooter") - Opposition Field Goal Percentage at the Rim, Opposition Field Goals made at the rim per game, total blocks.
- Rebounding opportunities (rebounds collected "within a 3.5-foot vicinity") - rebound chances per game, percentage of available rebounds grabbed, total rebounds.
- Drives (defined as "any touch that starts at least 20 feet of the hoop and is dribbled within 10 feet of the hoop, excluding fast breaks") - points per game on drives, team points per game on drives, total player points on drives.
- Catch and Shoot (definition: "any jump shot outside of 10 feet where a player possessed the ball for 2 seconds or less and took no dribbles") - catch and shoot points per game, catch and shoot 3-point field goals made per game, total catch and shoot points.
- Pull up shots (definition: "any jump shot outside 10 feet where a player took 1 or more dribbles before shooting") - pull up shots points per game, pull up shots 3-point field goals made per game, total pull up shots points.
