= Basketball statistician =

In basketball, a basketball statistician is an official responsible for recording statistics during games, and providing reports to coaches, league officials, and (depending on the competition) media and spectators.

In organized competition and at professional level, games may have a panel of one or more statisticians in attendance. The statistician's role is to record the game and provide a report (commonly known as a boxscore) during breaks between periods, and at the completion of each game. While the game scorer keeps track of points scored and fouls committed, statisticians also record other details of the game, such as assists, turnovers, and field goal percentage.

Game statistics can be recorded using tally sheets, or computer software designed for the purpose. Computerised methods are increasingly being used for professional competition and bigger tournaments.

== Notable basketball statisticians ==
- John Hollinger
- Bill Mokray
- Ken Pomeroy
