= Box score =

Structured summary of the results from a sport competition

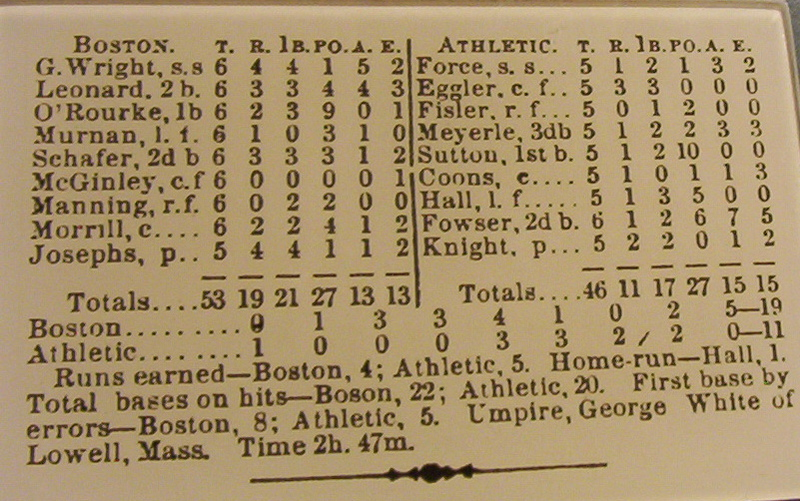
A baseball box score from 1876.

A box score is a structured summary of the results from a sport competition. The box score lists the game score as well as individual and team achievements in the game.

Among the sports in which box scores are common are baseball, basketball, American football, volleyball and hockey.

== Background ==
The box score data is derived from a statistics sheet and is then summarized into a table of counts or averages. This is used to help determine the relationship between elements, and in sports, certain percentages often help define the success of a team. This information is then correlated to a player, or a team where it is read to obtain a general idea of how the game was played or how the player performed during the game, a season, or their career.

== Early implementation ==
Prominent baseball journalist Henry Chadwick is credited with creating the modern baseball box score in 1859. In addition to the creation of the Chadwick box score, Chadwick also coined the baseball term "strike-out." The first game with the box score implemented was in 1859, featuring the Brooklyn Excelsiors versus the Brooklyn Stars, with the Brooklyn Stars being the victor.

== Terminology ==
=== Baseball ===
In baseball, the box score is a tabular summary of the achievements of the two teams and its players in a game. The box score lists the players in their batting order for each team along with their fielding positions, as well as statistics relating to their individual performances, such as at-bats, hits, walks, strikeouts, and runs batted in (RBI). A separate section contains relevant information about the pitchers who appeared in the game for either team, including their innings pitched, earned runs allowed, strikeouts, and earned run average (ERA).

An abbreviated review of the game, known as the line score, reports each team's run totals by inning, total runs scored, total hits, and total errors committed on a two-line chart, and appears at the top of the box score. The line score is often displayed on the field scoreboard and on television broadcasts, and is continually updated as the game is going on.

=== Basketball ===
In basketball, the box score is a statistical summary of the players' performances in a game. It includes both basic, traditional statistics such as points, rebounds, assists, steals, turnovers, and fouls, as well as more advanced metrics such as field-goal percentage (FG%), three-point field goals made, free throw percentage (FT%), player plus/minus, and efficiency ratings. Modern analytics have led to the creation of even more advanced NBA box scores for both teams and players. Since the 1996-1997 NBA Season, advanced team box scores have been displaying statistics such as assist-to-turnover ratio (AST/TO), true shooting percentage (TS%), offensive rating (OFFRTG), and defensive rating (DEFRTG).

=== Volleyball ===
In volleyball, a box score is s a statistical scoring summary of the match. The starting six players of each respective team, with the visiting team listed first, is listed on the left side of the box score. This is followed by players that substituted into the match below the starting six. A volleyball box score summarizes the Games played (GP), Kills (K), Errors (E), Total attempts (TA), Hitting percentage (PCT), Assists (A), Service ace (SA), Service error (SE), Reception error (RE), Dig (DIG), Block solo (BS), Block assist (BA), Blocking error (BE), Ball handling errors (BHE), and Total team blocks.

=== American football ===
In American football, various box score statistics are used to illustrate both team and individual performances. A football box score is divided into the following categories: passing statistics, rushing statistics, receiving statistics, yards from scrimmage statistics, return statistics, kicking statistics, punting statistics, and defensive statistics.
