= Adjusted Plus Minus =

Basketball analytic

== Background ==
Adjusted plus-minus (APM) is a basketball metric that estimates an individual player's effect on a game's scoring margin while controlling for the other players on the court. It is built from play-by-play data, which records every substitution and possession-ending event. The Dallas Mavericks were the first NBA team to use it: in the early 2000s, owner Mark Cuban commissioned the statisticians Jeff Sagarin, Wayne Winston, and Dan Rosenbaum, who built it into their WINVAL player-rating system to guide roster and salary decisions. Together with other analytical investments, it helped make the Mavericks one of the most progressive front offices of the era. Since then, analysts have developed several derivative metrics that attempt to improve on the original formulation.

== Methodology ==
APM is calculated from a single regression run over every stretch of a game in which no substitutions occur. Each such stretch, or "stint," is weighted by the number of possessions it contains and treated as one observation.

$MARGIN = b_0 + b_1X_1 + b_2X_2 + ... b_kX_k$

The dependent variable is the scoring margin per 100 possessions, measured from the home team's perspective. Every player in the league enters as an explanatory variable ($X_k$), coded +1 when on the floor for the home team, −1 for the away team, and 0 when off the court. The model is fit by weighted least squares, solving for every player's coefficient at once. A player's coefficient ($b_k$) estimates his effect on scoring margin per 100 possessions relative to a league-average player, after adjusting for the other nine players on the floor. Because all ten players appear in the same regression, the estimates account for the quality of teammates and opponents, isolating individual impact in a way that raw on/off plus-minus cannot. The intercept absorbs average home-court advantage.

== Advantages ==
Given a large enough sample, APM offers one of the most comprehensive approaches to player evaluation. Because it measures only a player's effect on scoring margin, it implicitly captures every on-court contribution, including those the box score never records. More traditional metrics, such as John Hollinger's Player Efficiency Rating (PER), are confined to recorded events and struggle in particular to measure defense. And because APM draws on every possession of a season, it rates players on a per-possession rather than a per-minute basis, making it insensitive to differences in pace of play or league-average scoring efficiency across teams and eras.

== Limitations ==
APM struggles with small samples and with separating statistical noise from long-term trends. It can take several seasons of data to produce a stable picture of a player's impact; single-season figures often fail the "laugh test," sometimes rating auxiliary role players above high-impact stars. Long windows carry their own problem, however, because rosters and a player's level of play change considerably over time, which can itself reduce the metric's accuracy. This sample requirement also limits APM's usefulness for season awards such as Most Valuable Player. Even over large samples, the inherent margin of error makes role players difficult to separate from one another, though star players tend to stand out clearly. The method also cannot fully disentangle players who frequently share the floor, so a role player who logs heavy minutes alongside a star may have his value distorted by that association—the central motivation for Joe Sill's later regularized version of the metric. Finally, APM does not account for coaching or for the synergistic effects of roster construction, making it more an indicator of player performance than of underlying talent.

== Variants & Derivatives of APM ==
Because of these limitations, analysts have proposed many refinements since APM's inception. Notable examples include:

- Box Plus-Minus (BPM): Pursues the same goal as APM but is built strictly from box-score and positional data rather than play-by-play data.
- Regularized Adjusted Plus-Minus (RAPM): Applies ridge regression — a regularized form of the same linear model, equivalent to imposing a Bayesian prior — in place of ordinary least squares, which stabilizes the estimates and yields more reliable results from smaller samples. The approach was introduced by Joe Sill at the 2010 MIT Sloan Sports Analytics Conference. Several later metrics use RAPM as a target, predicting it from richer box-score and tracking inputs:
  - Real Plus-Minus (RPM): Formerly published by ESPN; developed by Jeremias Engelmann and Steve Ilardi from Engelmann's xRAPM. ESPN removed it from its site after Engelmann joined the Mavericks.
  - RAPTOR: Developed by FiveThirtyEight, blending box-score, player-tracking, and on/off plus-minus data. It is no longer updated after FiveThirtyEight stopped producing sports content in 2023 and was shut down in 2025.
  - LEBRON: Produced by BBall-Index; begins with a box-score prior and incorporates regularized on/off data.
  - Estimated Plus-Minus (EPM): Hosted by Dunks & Threes; estimates RAPM from box-score and play-by-play inputs and is regarded as one of the more accurate publicly available catch-all metrics.
  - DARKO / Daily Plus-Minus (DPM): A daily-updating projection system created by Kostya Medvedovsky that uses an exponential-decay model, paired with Kalman filters, to forecast player performance; its plus-minus output, DPM, is forward-looking and noted for strong predictive accuracy.
