= Defensive rating =

Basketball statistic

Defensive rating or defensive efficiency is a statistic used in basketball to measure an individual player's or team's efficiency at preventing the other team from scoring points. It was created by author and statistician Dean Oliver. Oliver introduced the defensive rating statistic in his 2004 book, Basketball on Paper.

The offensive equivalent is offensive rating.

== Formula ==
The formula is: Defensive Player Rating = (Players Steals*Blocks) + Opponents Differential= 1/5 of possessions - Times blown by + Deflections * OAPDW( Official Adjusted Players Defensive Withstand). This stat can be influenced by the defense of a player's teammates.

== Leaders ==
Gar Heard's 95.30 defensive rating is the NBA's all-time career record (minimum 15,000 minutes played). Ben Wallace's 87.48 defensive rating in 2003–2004 is the single-season record. Trae Young has the highest career defensive rating (minimum 15,000 minutes played), at 118.3. Hakeem Olajuwon and David Robinson each led the league in defensive rating a record five times. Tim Duncan led the league in defensive rating four times. Dwight Howard and Ben Wallace each led the league three times. Alton Lister, Andre Drummond, Patrick Ewing, Kevin Garnett, Rudy Gobert, Bill Walton, and Hassan Whiteside each led the league two times.

=== Year-by-year ===
^	Denotes player who is still active in the NBA
*	Inducted into the Naismith Memorial Basketball Hall of Fame
†	Denotes player whose team won championship that year
Player (X)	Denotes the number of times the player had been named MVP at that time
Team (X)	Denotes the number of times a player from this team had won at that time

Season	Player	Position	DRtg	Team
1973–74	Bob Lanier*	Center	87.99	Detroit Pistons
1974–75	Elvin Hayes*	Power forward / center	87.60	Baltimore / Capital / Washington Bullets
1975–76	George T. Johnson	Power forward / center	89.81	Golden State Warriors
1976–77	Bobby Jones*	Power forward	89.91	Denver Nuggets
1977–78	Bill Walton*	Center	89.50	Portland Trail Blazers
1978–79	Robert Parish*	Center	94.37	Golden State Warriors
1979–80	Tree Rollins	Center	95.90	Atlanta Hawks
1980–81	Alvan Adams	Power forward / center	96.24	Phoenix Suns
1981–82	Jack Sikma*	Power forward / center	97.23	Seattle SuperSonics
1982–83	Alton Lister	center	96.19	Milwaukee Bucks
1983–84	Alton Lister (2)	center	98.63	Milwaukee Bucks
1984–85	Mark Eaton	center	96.50	Utah Jazz
1985–86	Bill Walton* (2)	Center	97.49	Boston Celtics
1986–87	Hakeem Olajuwon*	Center	98.75	Houston Rockets
1987–88	Hakeem Olajuwon* (2)	Center	98.05	Houston Rockets
1988–89	Hakeem Olajuwon* (3)	Center	94.86	Houston Rockets
1989–90	Hakeem Olajuwon* (4)	Center	93.43	Houston Rockets
1990–91	Hakeem Olajuwon* (5)	Center	93.39	Houston Rockets
1991–92	David Robinson*	Center	94.38	San Antonio Spurs
1992–93	Patrick Ewing*	Center	94.34	New York Knicks
1993–94	Patrick Ewing* (2)	Center	92.88	New York Knicks
1994–95	Scottie Pippen*	Small forward	98.25	Chicago Bulls
1995–96	David Robinson* (2)	Center	96.45	San Antonio Spurs
1996–97	Alonzo Mourning*	Center	95.31	Miami Heat
1997–98	David Robinson* (3)	Center	93.61	San Antonio Spurs
1998–99	David Robinson* (4)	Center	87.94	San Antonio Spurs
1999–2000	David Robinson* (5)	Center	92.22	San Antonio Spurs
2000–01	Marcus Camby	Center	90.56	New York Knicks
2001–02	Ben Wallace*	Center	92.89	Detroit Pistons
2002–03	Ben Wallace* (2)	Center	89.99	Detroit Pistons
2003–04 †	Ben Wallace* (3)	Center	87.48	Detroit Pistons
2004–05 †	Tim Duncan*	Power forward	93.17	San Antonio Spurs
2005–06	Tim Duncan* (2)	Power forward	94.41	San Antonio Spurs
2006–07 †	Tim Duncan* (3)	Power forward	94.45	San Antonio Spurs
2007–08 †	Kevin Garnett*	Power forward	93.85	Boston Celtics
2008–09	Dwight Howard*	Center	94.56	Orlando Magic
2009–10	Dwight Howard* (2)	Center	95.44	Orlando Magic
2010–11	Dwight Howard* (3)	Center	94.18	Orlando Magic
2011–12	Kevin Garnett* (2)	Power forward	94.21	Boston Celtics
2012–13 †	Tim Duncan* (4)	Power forward	94.97	San Antonio Spurs
2013–14	Joakim Noah	Center	95.82	Chicago Bulls
2014–15	Kawhi Leonard^	Small forward	94.45	San Antonio Spurs
2015–16	Hassan Whiteside	Center	94.52	Miami Heat
2016–17	Andre Drummond^	Center	99.04	Detroit Pistons
2017–18	Andre Drummond^ (2)	Center	99.01	Detroit Pistons
2018–19	Hassan Whiteside (2)	Center	99.03	Miami Heat
2019–20	Giannis Antetokounmpo^	Power forward	97.11	Milwaukee Bucks
2020–21	Rudy Gobert^	Center	100.64	Utah Jazz
2021–22	Robert Williams III^	Center	102.42	Boston Celtics
2022–23	Jaren Jackson Jr.^	Power forward	105.33	Memphis Grizzlies
2023–24	Rudy Gobert^ (2)	Center	104.45	Minnesota Timberwolves
2024–25	Isaiah Hartenstein^	Center / Power forward	103.57	Oklahoma City Thunder
2025–26	Victor Wembanyama^	Center / Power forward	100.97	San Antonio Spurs

== Multiple-time leaders ==
Rank	Player	Team	Times leader	Years
1	Hakeem Olajuwon	Houston Rockets	5	1986–87, 1987–88, 1988–89, 1989–90, 1990–91
1	David Robinson	San Antonio Spurs	5	1991–92, 1995–96, 1997–98, 1998–99, 1999–2000
3	Tim Duncan	San Antonio Spurs	4	2004–05, 2005–06, 2006–07, 2012–13
4	Dwight Howard	Orlando Magic	3	2008–09, 2009–10, 2010–11
4	Ben Wallace	Detroit Pistons	3	2001–02, 2002–03, 2003–04
6	Alton Lister	Milwaukee Bucks	2	1982–83,1983–84
6	Andre Drummond	Detroit Pistons	2	2016–17, 2017–18
6	Patrick Ewing	New York Knicks	2	1992–93, 1993–94
6	Kevin Garnett	Boston Celtics	2	2007–08, 2011–12
6	Rudy Gobert	Utah Jazz (1) / Minnesota Timberwolves (1)	2	2020–21, 2023–24
6	Bill Walton	Portland Trail Blazers (1) / Boston Celtics (1)	2	1977–78, 1985–86
6	Hassan Whiteside	Miami Heat	2	2015–16, 2018–19

== See also ==
- NBA records
- Advanced statistics in basketball
- Basketball statistics
