= Dean Oliver (statistician) =

American statistician and basketball coach

Lawrence Dean Oliver (born February 6, 1969) is an American statistician and coach. Oliver is a prominent contributor to the advanced statistical evaluation of basketball. He is the author of Basketball on Paper, the former producer of the defunct Journal of Basketball Studies. More recently, Oliver has served in front office roles with the Sacramento Kings, Seattle SuperSonics and Denver Nuggets of the NBA (including when the controversial trade for Allen Iverson was made). In October 2015 Dean Oliver joined TruMedia Networks as Vice President of Data Science. TruMedia Networks is an engineering firm specializing in sports analytics solutions for leagues, franchises and media partners, and says of Oliver in a press release announcing Dean Oliver's hiring, "Oliver was most recently in the front office of the Sacramento Kings and is considered one of the best minds in the world of sports analytics."

Oliver developed his work through a combination of technical studies and traditional basketball experience. He played Division III collegiate basketball at the historically win-challenged California Institute of Technology, graduating with honors with a degree in engineering there in 1990, and served as an assistant coach for the team beginning as a junior. He earned a Ph.D. in statistical applications in environmental science at the University of North Carolina at Chapel Hill in 1994 while scouting for Bertka Views, a scouting organization run by then-Los Angeles Lakers assistant coach, Bill Bertka.

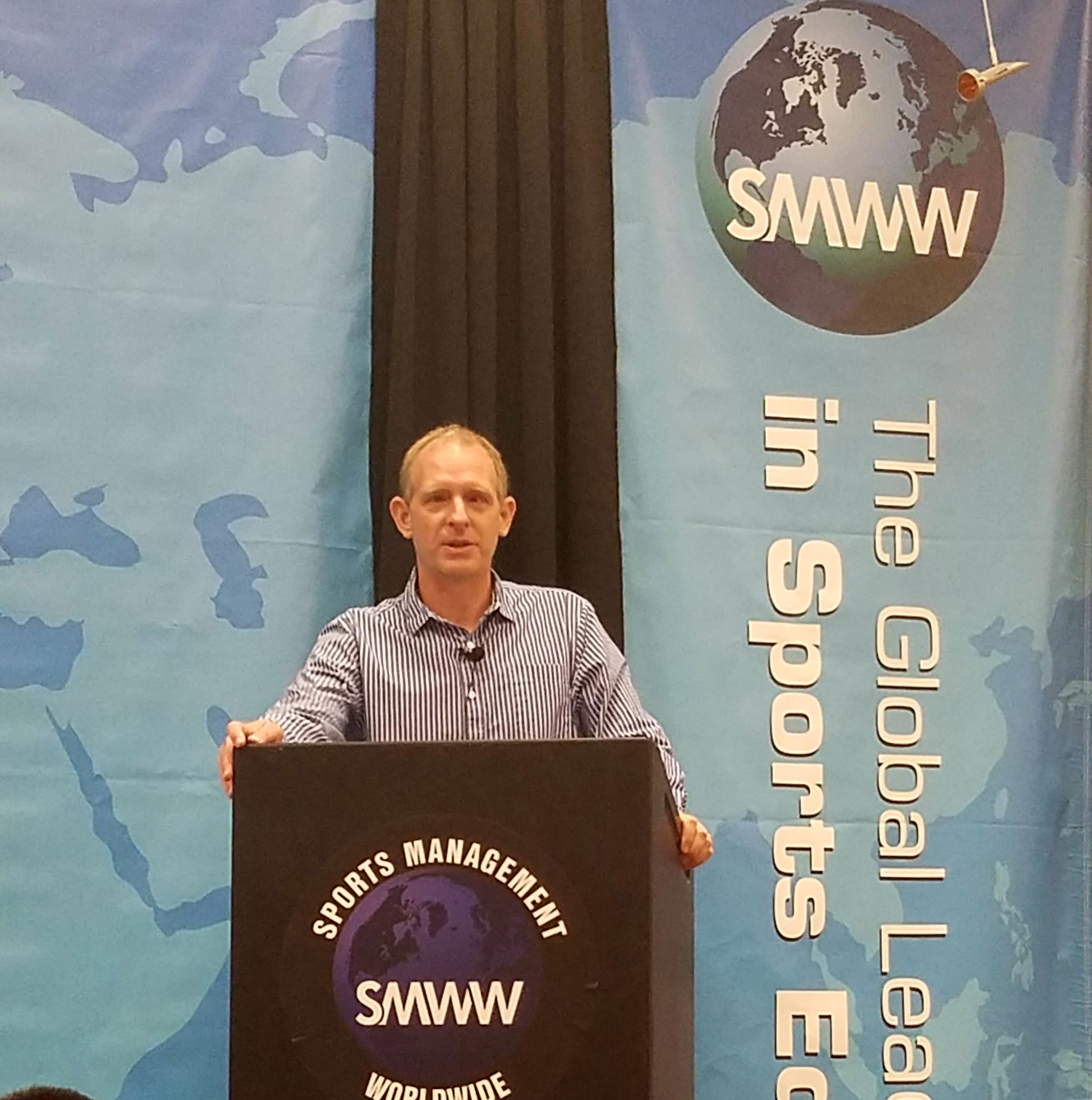
Dean Oliver speaking at the 2016 SMWW Basketball Career Conference

He served as an engineering consultant between 1995 and 2003, continuing to do basketball research during this period, writing Basketball on Paper in 2002 and writing on pro basketball for About.com between 1996 and 1998. In 2004, Oliver set out to create a position in the NBA for statistical analysis, following the trend set in baseball, as illustrated by the Michael Lewis book Moneyball, in 2003. By October 2004, he had impressively accomplished his goal and was hired as the first full-time statistical analyst in the NBA. In 2019, Oliver joined the Washington Wizards as an assistant coach. He is also a Basketball Analytics instructor and an annual Basketball Career Conference speaker for the online sports-career training school Sports Management Worldwide.

Oliver developed the statistic Player Winning Percentage (PW%), which comes from the formula:

Player Winning Percentage = Offensive Rating^{14} / (Offensive Rating^{14} + Defensive Rating^{14})
