= Sports economics =

Sports economics is a discipline of economics focused on its relationship to sports. It covers both the ways in which economists can study the distinctive institutions of sports, and the ways in which sports can allow economists to research many topics, including discrimination and antitrust law. The theoretical foundations of the discipline are heavily based on microeconomics. As of 2006, about 100 to 120 college professors taught sports economics courses. As of 2024 there are a number of important locations where sports economics is taught and researched by a group of faculty. This includes Bielefeld, Cork, Liverpool, Reading and Zurich in Europe, as well as Michigan and West Virginia in the United States. The community normally meets annually with prestigious events including the North American Association of Sports Economists (NAASE) Conference and the European Sport Economics Association (ESEA) Conference.

== The beginning of sports economics ==
Simon Rottenberg is credited with likely being the first to pen a scholarly article in the field of sports economics when he wrote his 1956 article on the Uncertainty of Outcome Hypothesis. In this article, Rottenberg highlights the relationship of attendance at baseball games with things such as price, alternate activities, how good the team is, how large of a market the team is in, and so on. Importantly, Rottenberg made mention of “dispersion of games won by team in the league.”

== Key components ==
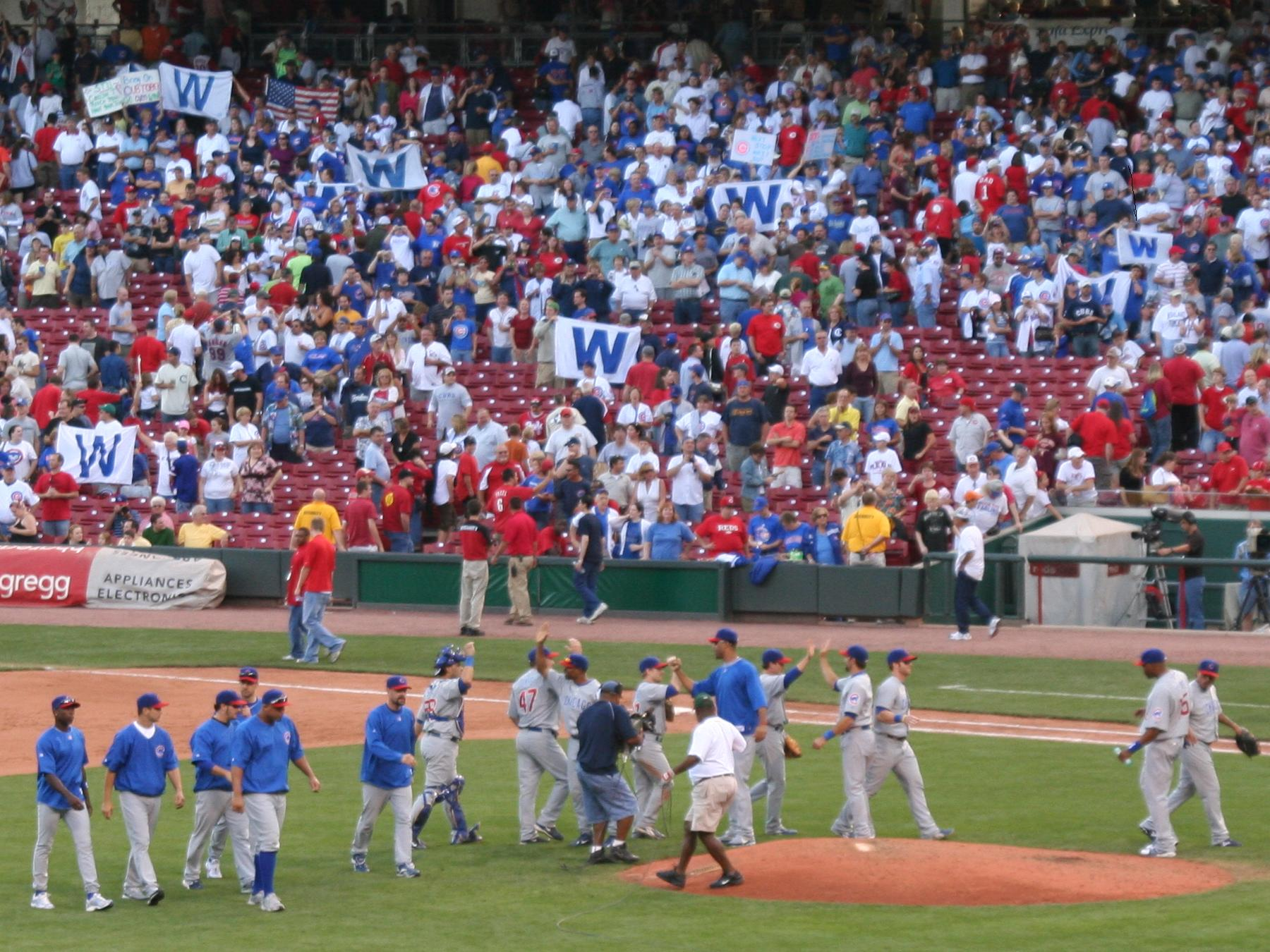
Fans attend Chicago Cubs game

Competitive balance is one of the most important ideas within sports economics. This idea, in general, refers to the comparison of wins between all teams in a league. Rottenberg effectively built this seminal idea with his interest in "dispersion of games won." Related to competitive balance is the understanding of different leagues and different team within those leagues objectives. Understanding the ownership structure and motives of front office personnel through their financial, read economic, decisions will reveal whether a team is looking to only generate profit, attempt to win a championship, or something entirely different. Making sense of human behavior through data is the central idea of economics and certainly applies to Sports Economics as well. Sports leagues look to promote competitive balance to make more games appealing to fans to watch, both in person and on TV. Many European leagues achieve competitive balance through promotion and relegation systems where multiple leagues are intertwined with teams moving between leagues based upon performance. Most sports leagues in the United States are standalone league and work towards competitive balance through other measures. These can include salary caps and roster size limits.

== Importance ==
Sometimes sports economics is dismissed as a side hobby for number crunchers. However, the proliferation of globalized sports markets as well as the extreme rise in sports media demonstrates its importance. In the United States, the Super Bowl regularly commands the attention of millions. In the EU, over 15 million people are employed in the sports world. On a larger scale, sports and sporting outlets provide health benefits as well as general satisfaction for a citizenry which are both prominent state concerns the world over. Another feature of sports economics is the data-rich environment in sports, from which economists can apply and investigate common economic models or problems, thus contributing to the field of economics at large.
