= MIT Sloan Sports Analytics Conference =

Annual sports analytics conference

- Founded: 2006
- Founder: Daryl Morey; Jessica Gelman
- Type: Sports analytics
- Location: Boston, Massachusetts
- Website: sloansportsconference.com

The MIT Sloan Sports Analytics Conference (SSAC) is an annual event that provides a forum for industry professionals (executives and leading researchers) and students to discuss the increasing role of analytics in the sports industry. The conference is held in the Boston area, and while its location has moved from the MIT campus to higher capacity convention centers such as the Hynes Convention Center and the Boston Convention and Exhibition Center, it has always occurred during February or March.

Founded in 2006, the conference is co-chaired by Daryl Morey, who was most recently president of basketball operations for the Philadelphia 76ers, and Jessica Gelman, CEO of Kraft Analytics Group, who oversee MIT Sloan students (from the EMS Club) (Note: The MIT Sloan EMS Club is a student-run club that aims to help MIT Sloan students learn about its target industries as well as extend the MIT Sloan brand as a leading business school in the entertainment, media, and sports worlds.) in the planning and operating of the yearly conference. It is the largest student-run conference in the world, attracting students from over 170 different schools and representatives from over 80 professional sports teams in Major League Baseball, the National Basketball Association, National Football League, National Hockey League, Major League Soccer, and Premier League. ESPN has been the presenting sponsor since 2010, and the conference has garnered national attention through media outlets such as Sports Illustrated, The Wall Street Journal, The New York Times, The Boston Globe, Time, BusinessWeek, NBC Sports, Fox Sports, Pardon the Interruption, and Forbes. The conference was ranked by Fast Company as the third-most innovative company in sports in 2012.
