= Basketball statistics =

Evaluation performance methods in the sport

Statistics in basketball are kept to evaluate a player's or a team's performance.

== Examples ==
Examples of basketball statistics include:

- GM, GP; GS: games played; games started
- PTS: points
- FGM, FGA, FG%: field goals made, attempted and percentage
- FTM, FTA, FT%: free throws made, attempted and percentage
- 3FGM, 3FGA, 3FG% (or 3PM, 3PA, 3P%): three-point field goals made, attempted and percentage
- REB, OREB, DREB: rebounds, offensive rebounds, defensive rebounds
- AST: assists
- STL: steals
- BLK: blocks
- TO: turnovers
- TD: triple double
- EFF: efficiency: NBA's efficiency rating: (PTS + REB + AST + STL + BLK − ((FGA − FGM) + (FTA − FTM) + TO))
- PF: personal fouls
- MIN: minutes
- AST/TO: assist to turnover ratio
- PER: Player Efficiency Rating: John Hollinger's Player Efficiency Rating
- PIR: Performance Index Rating: Euroleague's and Eurocup's Performance Index Rating: (Points + Rebounds + Assists + Steals + Blocks + Fouls Drawn) − (Missed Field Goals + Missed Free Throws + Turnovers + Shots Rejected + Fouls Committed)

Averages per game are denoted by *PG, e.g. PPG (points), BLKPG or BPG (blocks), STPG or SPG (steals), APG (assists), RPG (rebounds) and MPG (minutes). Sometime the players statistics are divided by minutes played and multiplied by 48 minutes (had he played the entire game), denoted by * per 48 min. or *48M.

A player who makes double digits in a game in any two of the PTS, REB, AST, STL, and BLK statistics is said to make a double double; in three statistics, a triple double; in four statistics, a quadruple double. A quadruple double is extremely rare (and has only occurred four times in the NBA). There is also a 5x5, when a player records at least a 5 in each of the 5 statistics.

The NBA also posts to the statistics section of its website a simple composite efficiency statistic, denoted EFF and derived by the formula, ((Points + Rebounds + Assists + Steals + Blocks) − ((Field Goals Attempted − Field Goals Made) + (Free Throws Attempted − Free Throws Made) + Turnovers)). While conveniently distilling most of a player's key statistics in one numerical score, the formula is not highly regarded by the statistics community, with the alternative Player Efficiency Rating developed by ESPN basketball statistician John Hollinger being more widely used to compare the overall efficiency of players.

== Tempo-free statistics ==
Examples of tempo-free statistics including the following

- Pace: Possessions per game (typically ranges from 60 to 75)
- PPP: Points per possession, the points a team score for each possession regardless of a team's pace
- TO%: Turnover percentage, the measure of how often a team loses possession of the ball before creating a scoring opportunity

== Fantasy leagues ==
In fantasy basketball, statistics are used in a formula as the measurement of a player's performance.

== See also ==
- NBA records
- Player Efficiency Rating
- Efficiency (basketball)
- Similarity score
- Advanced statistics in basketball
