= Player efficiency rating =

Analysis of basketball statistics

The player efficiency rating (PER) is John Hollinger's all-in-one basketball rating, which attempts to collect or boil down all of a player's contributions into one number. Using a detailed formula, Hollinger developed a system that rates every player's statistical performance.

== Overview ==
PER strives to measure a player's per-minute performance, while adjusting for pace. A league-average PER is always 15.00, which permits comparisons of player performance across seasons. PER takes into account positive results, including field goals, free throws, 3-pointers, assists, rebounds, blocks and steals and negative results, including missed shots, turnovers and personal fouls. The formula adds positive stats and subtracts negative ones through a statistical point value system. The rating for each player is then adjusted to a per-minute basis so that, for example, substitutes can be compared with starters in playing time debates. It is also adjusted for the team's pace. In the end, one number sums up the players' statistical accomplishments for that season.

=== Relationship to baseball sabermetrics ===
Hollinger's work has benefited from the observations of sabermetric baseball analysts, such as Bill James. The initial observations is that traditional counting statistics in baseball, like runs batted in and wins, are not reliable indicators of a player's value. For example, runs batted in is highly dependent upon opportunities created by a player's teammates. PER extends this critique of counting statistics to basketball, noting that a player's opportunities to accumulate statistics are dependent upon the number of minutes played as well as the pace of the game.

== Problems ==
PER largely measures offensive performance. Hollinger freely admits that two of the defensive statistics it incorporates—blocks and steals (which was not tracked as an official stat until 1973)—can produce a distorted picture of a player's value and that PER is not a reliable measure of a player's defensive acumen. For example, Bruce Bowen, widely regarded as one of the best defenders in the NBA through the 2006–07 season, routinely posted single-digit PERs.

Bear in mind that this rating is not the final, once-and-for-all answer for a player's accomplishments during the season. This is especially true for players such as Bruce Bowen and Trenton Hassell who are defensive specialists but don't get many blocks or steals.

Some have argued that PER gives undue weight to a player's contribution in limited minutes, or against a team's second unit, and it undervalues players who have enough diversity in their game to play starter's minutes. PER has been said to reward inefficient shooting. To quote Dave Berri, the author of The Wages of Wins:

Hollinger argues that each two point field goal made is worth about 1.65 points. A three point field goal made is worth 2.65 points. A missed field goal, though, costs a team 0.72 points. Given these values, with a bit of math we can show that a player will break even on his two point field goal attempts if he hits on 30.4% of these shots. On three pointers the break-even point is 21.4%. If a player exceeds these thresholds, and virtually every NBA player does so with respect to two-point shots, the more he shoots the higher his value in PERs. So a player can be an inefficient scorer and simply inflate his value by taking a large number of shots.

Hollinger responded via a post on ESPN's TrueHoop blog:

Berri leads off with a huge misunderstanding of PER—that the credits and debits it gives for making and missing shots equate to a “break-even” shooting mark of 30.4% on 2-point shots. He made this assumption because he forgot that PER is calibrated against the rest of the league at the end of the formula.

Actually, if we took a player that was completely average in every other respect for the 2006–07 season—rebounds, free throws, assists, turnovers, etc.—and gave him a league-average rate of shots, and all of them were 2-pointers, and he shot 30.4%, he'd end up with a PER of 7.18. As long-time PER fans know, that would make him considerably worse than nearly every player in the league.

To end up with a league-average PER of 15.00, the actual break-even mark in this case is 48.5%, which is exactly what the league average is on 2-point shots this season.

=== Reference guide ===
Hollinger established PER such that the league average is 15.00 each season, creating a standardized reference point for comparison:

All-time great season	35.0+
Runaway MVP candidate	30.0–35.0
Strong MVP candidate	27.5–30.0
Weak MVP candidate	25.0–27.5
Definite All-Star	22.5–25.0
Borderline All-Star	20.0–22.5
Second offensive option	18.0–20.0
Third offensive option	16.5–18.0
Slightly above-average player	15.0–16.5
Rotation player	13.0–15.0
Non-rotation player	11.0–13.0
Fringe roster player	9.0–11.0
Player who won't stick in the league	0–9.0

A player posted a season efficiency rating over 30.0 just 37 times, with the highest score being 32.85 (Nikola Jokić). Nikola Jokić leads with five 30+ seasons, with Michael Jordan, LeBron James and Giannis Antetokounmpo having four each, Shaquille O'Neal, Wilt Chamberlain and Joel Embiid having three each, Anthony Davis having two, and David Robinson, Tracy McGrady, Dwyane Wade, Stephen Curry, Russell Westbrook, James Harden and Shai Gilgeous-Alexander each with one.

== Career NBA PER leaders ==
=== Regular season ===
Statistics accurate as of the 2025–26 NBA season.

^	Active NBA player
*	Inducted into the Naismith Memorial Basketball Hall of Fame

Rank	Player	Pos	Team(s) played for (years) (Note: American Basketball Association (ABA) teams other than those admitted into the NBA in 1976 are not included; each year is linked to an article about that particular NBA season.)	PER
1	Nikola Jokić^	C	Denver Nuggets (2015–present)	28.85
2	Joel Embiid^	C	Philadelphia 76ers (2014–present)	27.98
3	Michael Jordan*	SG	Chicago Bulls (1984–1993, 1995–1998); Washington Wizards (2001–2003)	27.91
4	LeBron James^	SF	Cleveland Cavaliers (2003–2010, 2014–2018); Miami Heat (2010–2014); Los Angeles Lakers (2018–2026) Philadelphia 76ers (2026–present)	26.69
5	Anthony Davis^	PF/C	New Orleans Hornets/Pelicans (2012–2019); Los Angeles Lakers (2019–2025); Dallas Mavericks (2025–2026)	26.68
6	Shaquille O'Neal*	C	Orlando Magic (1992–1996); Los Angeles Lakers (1996–2004); Miami Heat (2004–2008); Phoenix Suns (2008–2009); Cleveland Cavaliers (2009–2010); Boston Celtics (2010–2011)	26.43
7	David Robinson*	C	San Antonio Spurs (1989–2003)	26.18
8	Wilt Chamberlain*	C	Philadelphia/San Francisco Warriors (1959–1965); Philadelphia 76ers (1965–1968); Los Angeles Lakers (1968–1973)	26.16
9	Giannis Antetokounmpo^	PF	Milwaukee Bucks (2013–present)	26.07
10	Luka Dončić^	PG	Dallas Mavericks (2018–2025); Los Angeles Lakers (2025–present)	25.85
11	Bob Pettit*	PF/C	Milwaukee/St. Louis Hawks (1954–1965)	25.45
12	Neil Johnston*	C	Philadelphia Warriors (1951–1959)	24.86
13	Charles Barkley*	PF	Philadelphia 76ers (1984–1992); Phoenix Suns (1992–1996); Houston Rockets (1996–2000)	24.63
14	Kareem Abdul-Jabbar*	C	Milwaukee Bucks (1969–1975); Los Angeles Lakers (1975–1989)	24.58
15	Kevin Durant^	SF/PF	Seattle SuperSonics/Oklahoma City Thunder (2007–2016); Golden State Warriors (2016–2019); Brooklyn Nets (2019–2023); Phoenix Suns (2023–2025); Houston Rockets (2025–present)	24.55
16	Shai Gilgeous-Alexander^	PG/SG	Los Angeles Clippers (2018–2019); Oklahoma City Thunder (2019–present)	24.39
17	Tim Duncan*	PF/C	San Antonio Spurs (1997–2016)	24.22
18	Magic Johnson*	PG	Los Angeles Lakers (1979–1991, 1996)	24.11
19	Karl Malone*	PF	Utah Jazz (1985–2003); Los Angeles Lakers (2003–2004)	23.90
20	Kawhi Leonard^	SF	San Antonio Spurs (2011–2018); Toronto Raptors (2018–2019); Los Angeles Clippers (2019–present)	23.63
21	Karl-Anthony Towns^	C	Minnesota Timberwolves (2015–2024); New York Knicks (2024–present)	23.62
22	Hakeem Olajuwon*	C	Houston Rockets (1984–2001); Toronto Raptors (2001–2002)	23.59
23	James Harden^	SG/PG	Oklahoma City Thunder (2009–2012); Houston Rockets (2012–2021); Brooklyn Nets (2021–2022); Philadelphia 76ers (2022–2023); Los Angeles Clippers (2023–2026); Cleveland Cavaliers (2026–present)	23.51
24	Larry Bird*	SF/PF	Boston Celtics (1979–1992)	23.50
25	Dwyane Wade*	SG	Miami Heat (2003–2016, 2018–2019); Chicago Bulls (2016–2017); Cleveland Cavaliers (2017–2018)	23.48

=== Playoff ===
Statistics accurate as of the 2026 NBA playoffs.

^	Active NBA player
*	Inducted into the Naismith Memorial Basketball Hall of Fame

Rank	Player	Pos	Playoff team(s) played for (years) (Note: American Basketball Association (ABA) teams other than those admitted into the NBA in 1976 are not included; each year is linked to an article about that particular NBA playoffs.)	PER
1	Michael Jordan*	SG	Chicago Bulls (1985–1993, 1995–1998)	28.60
2	George Mikan*	C	Minneapolis Lakers (1949–1954, 1956)	28.51
3	Nikola Jokić^	C	Denver Nuggets (2019–2026)	28.12
4	LeBron James^	SF	Cleveland Cavaliers (2006–2010, 2015–2018); Miami Heat (2011–2014); Los Angeles Lakers (2020–2021, 2023–2026)	27.58
5	Anthony Davis^	PF/C	New Orleans Pelicans (2015, 2018); Los Angeles Lakers (2020–2021, 2023–2024)	26.59
6	Shaquille O'Neal*	C	Orlando Magic (1994–1996); Los Angeles Lakers (1997–2004); Miami Heat (2005–2007); Phoenix Suns (2008); Cleveland Cavaliers (2010); Boston Celtics (2011)	26.13
7	Giannis Antetokounmpo^	PF	Milwaukee Bucks (2015, 2017–2025)	26.08
8	Hakeem Olajuwon*	C	Houston Rockets (1985–1991, 1993–1999); Toronto Raptors (2002)	25.69
9	Luka Dončić^	PG	Dallas Mavericks (2020–2022, 2024); Los Angeles Lakers (2025)	25.04
10	Tim Duncan*	PF/C	San Antonio Spurs (1998–1999, 2001–2016)	24.28
11	Kawhi Leonard^	SF	San Antonio Spurs (2012–2017); Toronto Raptors (2019); Los Angeles Clippers (2020–2021, 2023–2025)	24.18
12	Charles Barkley*	PF	Philadelphia 76ers (1985–1987, 1989–1991); Phoenix Suns (1993–1996); Houston Rockets (1997–1999)	24.18
13	Kevin Durant^	SF/PF	Oklahoma City Thunder (2010–2014, 2016); Golden State Warriors (2017–2019); Brooklyn Nets (2021–2022); Phoenix Suns (2023–2024); Houston Rockets (2026)	23.95
14	Dirk Nowitzki*	PF	Dallas Mavericks (2001–2012, 2014–2016)	23.82
15	Tracy McGrady*	SG/SF	Toronto Raptors (2000); Orlando Magic (2001–2003); Houston Rockets (2005, 2007–2008); Atlanta Hawks (2012); San Antonio Spurs (2013)	23.40
16	Dolph Schayes*	PF/C	Syracuse Nationals (1950–1963)	23.29
17	Chris Paul	PG	New Orleans Hornets (2008–2009, 2011); Los Angeles Clippers (2012–2017); Houston Rockets (2018–2019); Oklahoma City Thunder (2020); Phoenix Suns (2021–2023)	23.18
18	Jerry West*	PG/SG	Los Angeles Lakers (1961–1970, 1972–1974)	23.06
19	Shai Gilgeous-Alexander^	PG/SG	Los Angeles Clippers (2019); Oklahoma City Thunder (2020, 2024–2026)	23.05
20	David Robinson*	C	San Antonio Spurs (1990–1996, 1998–2003)	23.02
21	Kareem Abdul-Jabbar*	C	Milwaukee Bucks (1970–1974); Los Angeles Lakers (1977–1989)	23.01
22	Magic Johnson*	PG	Los Angeles Lakers (1980–1991, 1996)	22.95
23	Stephen Curry^	PG	Golden State Warriors (2013–2019, 2022–2023, 2025)	22.83
24	Wilt Chamberlain*	C	Philadelphia/San Francisco Warriors (1960–1962, 1964); Philadelphia 76ers (1965–1968); Los Angeles Lakers (1969–1973)	22.75
25	Bob Pettit*	PF/C	St. Louis Hawks (1956–1961, 1963–1965)	22.59

=== Finals ===
Statistics accurate as of the 2026 NBA Finals (minimum 10 games played).

^	Active NBA player
*	Inducted into the Naismith Memorial Basketball Hall of Fame

Rank	Player	Pos	Finals team(s) played for (years)	PER
1	Kevin Durant^	SF/PF	Oklahoma City Thunder (2012); Golden State Warriors (2017–2019)	30.8
2	Shaquille O'Neal*	C	Orlando Magic (1995); Los Angeles Lakers (2000–2002, 2004); Miami Heat (2006)	29.1
3	Michael Jordan*	SG	Chicago Bulls (1991–1993, 1996–1998)	29.1
4	LeBron James^	SF	Cleveland Cavaliers (2007, 2015–2018); Miami Heat (2011–2014); Los Angeles Lakers (2020)	28.1
5	Magic Johnson*	PG	Los Angeles Lakers (1980, 1982–1985, 1987–1989, 1991)	27.3
6	Chauncey Billups*	PG	Detroit Pistons (2004–2005)	26.4
7	Jimmy Butler^	SF	Miami Heat (2020, 2023)	25.8
8	Tim Duncan*	PF/C	San Antonio Spurs (1999, 2003, 2005, 2007, 2013–2014)	25.3
9	Kawhi Leonard^	SF	San Antonio Spurs (2013–2014); Toronto Raptors (2019)	25.2
10	Dwyane Wade*	SG	Miami Heat (2006, 2011–2014)	24.9

== Analysis ==
=== Career PER – Michael Jordan vs. LeBron James ===
Prior to the 2013–14 season, LeBron James was on the verge of surpassing Michael Jordan's career PER to take the number one spot. As the metric is averaged over the length of a player's entire career a decrease in efficiency later in his career means a player can move down in the ranking; Jordan's PER took a big hit in the final two years of his career when he returned to the game with the Washington Wizards, posting 20.7 in his penultimate season and 19.3 in his final season, compared to his career high of 31.7 (Jordan's PER was 29.1 without accounting for his Wizards years).

The debate was intensified on October 1, 2013, with Jordan stating that he would have liked to have played against LeBron, and believes he would have won a one-on-one encounter. Several news features focus on comparing the two players by using the PER metric. At the conclusion of the 2012–13 NBA season Miami Heat head coach, Erik Spoelstra, stated that comparing players from different generations is the equivalent to comparing apples and oranges, explaining: "You'll never be able to tell [how James stacks up to Jordan or Magic Johnson] because they didn't play against each other. The game is different now than when it was played in the 1980s or even before that."

=== Players from different NBA generations and career PER ===
Comparing players from different generations using PER presents several problems, this is primarily due to the rule changes and the changes in statistical data collected from different eras (although many other factors could be taken into consideration, even down to the increased sample size as the NBA grew through incorporating more teams). Some of the more important rule changes that should be considered include; some of the players on this list, such as Wilt Chamberlain and Bill Russell, played before the three-point shot, blocks, and steals stats were officially recorded. Blocked shots and steals were first officially recorded in the NBA during the 1973–74 season. The three-point shot entered the league in 1979–80 season. During the 1990s and 2000s, numerous rule changes were incorporated, the three-point foul and clear path rules were both introduced in the 1995–96 season with the effect of increasing the number of free throws, hand-checking (the amount of contact a defender may make with an opposing player) was banned in 1994 and the use of elbows was banned in 1997 (both rules had seen various degrees of limitation by earlier rule changes) although neither was fully implemented until 2004. The 2004 rule changes, which also included calling the defensive 3 second rule ("a defensive player may not station himself in the key area longer than three seconds"—a longstanding rule which had been ignored by referees) had a major effect, opening up the game and allowing a more free-flowing offense; it encouraged aggressive inside attack based plays (to draw fouls), and has increased the number of fouls given when contact is made on players who drive to the basket. In 2009, former ABA and NBA Coach Larry Brown was quoted as saying: "The college game is much more physical than [the NBA]. I always tease Michael [Jordan], if he played today, he'd average 50."

== Calculation ==
All calculations begin with what is called unadjusted PER (uPER). The formula is:

$uPER = \frac{1}{min} \times \left ( 3P + \left [ \frac{2}{3} \times AST \right ] + \left [ \left ( 2 - factor \times \frac{tmAST}{tmFG} \right ) \times FG \right ] + \left [ 0.5 \times FT \times \left ( 2 - \frac{1}{3} \times \frac{tmAST}{tmFG} \right ) \right ] - \left [ VOP \times TO \right ] - \left [ VOP \times DRBP \times \left ( FGA - FG \right ) \right ] - \left [ VOP \times 0.44 \times \left ( 0.44 + \left ( 0.56 \times DRBP \right ) \right ) \times \left ( FTA - FT \right ) \right ] + \left [ VOP \times \left ( 1 - DRBP \right ) \times \left ( TRB - ORB \right ) \right ] + \left [ VOP \times DRBP \times ORB \right ] + \left [ VOP \times STL \right ] + \left [ VOP \times DRBP \times BLK \right ] - \left [ PF \times \left ( \frac{lgFT}{lgPF} - 0.44 \times \frac{lgFTA}{lgPF} \times VOP \right ) \right ] \right )$

When multiplied out and refactored, the equation above becomes:

$uPER = \frac{1}{min} \times \left ( 3P - \frac{PF \times lgFT}{lgPF} + \left [ \frac{FT}{2} \times \left ( 2 - \frac{tmAST}{3 \times tmFG} \right ) \right ] + \left [ FG \times \left ( 2 - \frac{factor \times tmAST}{tmFG} \right ) \right ] + \frac{2 \times AST}{3} + VOP \times \left [ DRBP \times \left ( 2 \times ORB + BLK - 0.2464 \times \left [ FTA - FT \right ] - \left [ FGA - FG \right ] - TRB \right ) + \frac{0.44 \times lgFTA \times PF}{lgPF} - \left ( TO + ORB \right ) + STL + TRB - 0.1936 \left (FTA - FT \right ) \right ] \right )$

Where

- $\ factor = \frac{2}{3} - \left [ \left ( 0.5 \times \frac{lgAST}{lgFG} \right ) \div \left ( 2 \times \frac{lgFG}{lgFT} \right ) \right ]$,
- $\ VOP = \frac{lgPTS}{lgFGA - lgORB + lgTO + 0.44 \times lgFTA}$,
- $\ DRBP = \frac{lgTRB - lgORB}{lgTRB}$.

With

- tm, the prefix, indicating of team rather than of player;
- lg, the prefix, indicating of league rather than of player;
- min for number of minutes played;
- 3P for number of three-point field goals made;
- FG for number of field goals made;
- FT for number of free throws made;
- VOP for value of possession (but in reference to the league, in this instance);
- RB for number of rebounds: ORB for offensive, DRB for defensive, TRB for (total) combined, RBP for percentage of offensive or defensive;
- others being outlined in basketball statistics.

Once uPER is calculated, it must be adjusted for team pace and normalized to the league to become PER:

$\ PER = \left ( uPER \times \frac{lgPace}{tmPace} \right ) \times \frac{15}{lguPER}$

This final step takes away the advantage held by players whose teams play a fastbreak style (and therefore have more possessions and more opportunities to do things on offense), and then sets the league average to 15.00. Also note that it is impossible to calculate PER (at least in the conventional manner described above) for NBA seasons prior to 1978, as the league did not keep track of turnovers among other advanced statistics before that year.

== See also ==
- Advanced statistics in basketball
- Basketball statistics
- NBA records
