= John Hollinger =

American NBA columnist (born 1971)

John Hollinger (born May 17, 1971) is the former Vice President of Basketball Operations for the Memphis Grizzlies of the National Basketball Association (NBA) and current Senior NBA columnist at The Athletic. Prior to December 2012, he was an analyst and writer for ESPN, primarily covering the NBA. Hollinger grew up in Mahwah, New Jersey, and is a 1993 graduate of the University of Virginia.

Hollinger developed the website Alleyoop in 1996, initially as a hobby and sounding board. Touting the site as "The Basketball Page for Thinking Fans", Hollinger followed in the footsteps of Dean Oliver and Bob Bellotti to attempt to develop the ultimate basketball statistic. During Alleyoop's early years, Hollinger experimented with offensive and defensive ratings (points created and allowed per 100 possessions) in much the same way as Oliver, as a means of quantifying a player's overall contribution to his team. Hollinger's writing style and incisive commentary caught the eye of such industry luminaries as the magazine Web and The Wall Street Journal.

Hollinger spent the next three years as the sports editor at OregonLive.com,. It was during his OregonLive years that Hollinger developed his Player Efficiency Rating (PER), a figure that attempts to combine all of a player's contributions into one number. After his stint in Portland, Hollinger was hired as the basketball editor at SI.com, Sports Illustrated's online sister site. In 2002, Hollinger released the first Pro Basketball Prospectus which was his first work published in print.

Hollinger has authored three more Prospectuses, now called Pro Basketball Forecasts. He left Sports Illustrated to write for ESPN.com in the summer of 2005, and his weekly columns were available through their "insider" subscription service. Additionally, Hollinger wrote for the New York Sun's sports section. Hollinger has appeared every year on the basketball analytics panel, at the annual MIT Sloan Sports Analytics Conference.

== Hollinger game score ==
As an extension of the Player Efficiency Rating, Hollinger also developed a simpler formula that quantifies how impressive a player's individual performance is in a given game. The Hollinger game score formula is:

$PTS + 0.4 * FG - 0.7 * FGA - 0.4*(FTA - FT) + 0.7 * ORB + 0.3 * DRB + STL + 0.7 * AST + 0.7 * BLK - 0.4 * PF - TOV. Per.$

The game score was created to give a rough measure of a player's productivity for a single game. The scale is similar to that of points scored, (40 is an outstanding performance, 10 is an average performance, etc.). The entire modern box score of the player is needed for calculation, including offensive and defensive rebounding, steals, blocks and turnovers, so the Hollinger Game Score can only be applied to games played since the 1978 season.
