= Kevin Pillar =

American baseball player (born 1989)

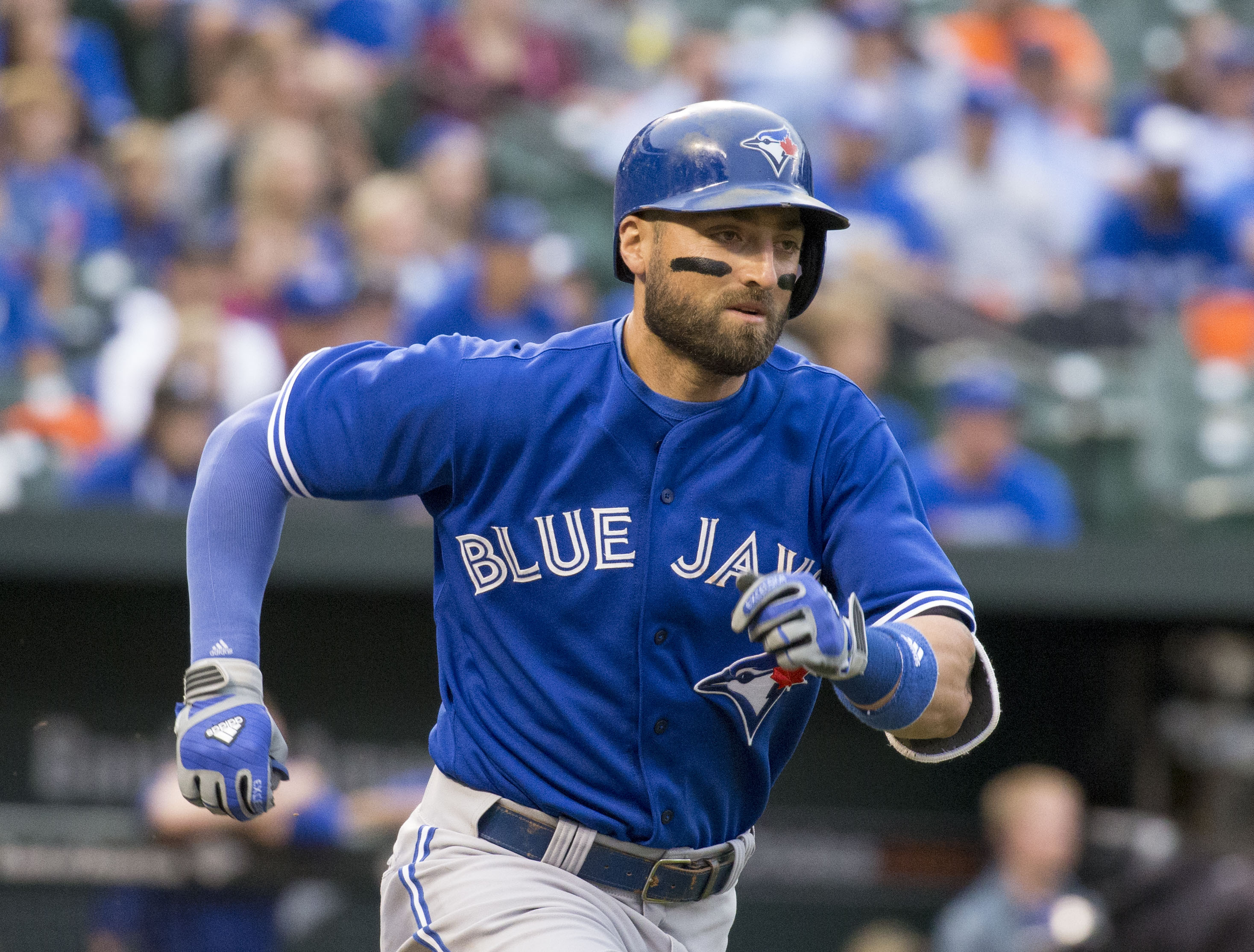
- Pillar with the Toronto Blue Jays in 2015
- Outfielder
- Born: January 4, 1989 (age 37); West Hills, California, U.S.
- Batted: Right Threw: Right

MLB debut
- August 14, 2013, for the Toronto Blue Jays

Last MLB appearance
- May 23, 2025, for the Texas Rangers

MLB statistics
- Batting average: .255
- Home runs: 114
- Runs batted in: 469
- Stats at Baseball Reference

Teams
- Toronto Blue Jays (2013–2019); San Francisco Giants (2019); Boston Red Sox (2020); Colorado Rockies (2020); New York Mets (2021); Los Angeles Dodgers (2022); Atlanta Braves (2023); Chicago White Sox (2024); Los Angeles Angels (2024); Texas Rangers (2025)

Kevin Andrew Pillar (/pɪˈlɑːr/) (born January 4, 1989) is an American former professional baseball outfielder. He played in Major League Baseball (MLB) for the Toronto Blue Jays, San Francisco Giants, Boston Red Sox, Colorado Rockies, New York Mets, Los Angeles Dodgers, Atlanta Braves, Chicago White Sox, Los Angeles Angels, and Texas Rangers.

Pillar was an All-American center fielder in college. He set the NCAA Division II record with a 54-game hitting streak in 2010, and established his school's all-time record with a career batting average of .367. Pillar was drafted by the Blue Jays in the 32nd round (979th overall) of the 2011 MLB draft.

In 2011, he batted .347, winning the Appalachian League batting title and leading the organization in batting average in his first minor league season, and was named an Appalachian League All-Star. In 2012 Pillar batted .323, while stealing 51 bases (second-most in the organization), and was named the Midwest League MVP, a mid-season and a post-season All-Star, the best hitting prospect in the league by Baseball America, and a Topps Class A All-Star and MiLB.com Organization All-Star. In 2013, he led the organization in hits for the second consecutive year, and Baseball America designated him the "Best Hitter for Average" among the Blue Jays' prospects. He made his major league debut for the Blue Jays in August 2013. In 2014, he led the International League in doubles while batting .323, and was named an IL post-season All-Star. In his minor league career through 2016, he batted .324.

In 2015, Pillar led all major league outfielders in putouts, and was named the Wilson Defensive Player of the Year for center field. In 2016, he was awarded the Fielding Bible Award for the center field position. In 2017, his .997 fielding percentage as a center fielder was the best in the American League.

== Early life ==
Pillar was born in the Los Angeles district of West Hills, California, to Mike and Wendy Pillar. He grew up a Los Angeles Dodgers fan. Pillar is Jewish and had a Bar Mitzvah; his mother is Jewish, whereas his father is Christian. In 2016 he established the Pillar-Lambert Scholarship in Accounting at Tel Aviv University in Israel, in honor of his late maternal grandfather Ed Lambert. Through 2022, he was 5th in career steals on the all-time list of Jewish major leaguers (directly behind Brad Ausmus, and ahead of Gabe Kapler), 9th in career doubles (behind Sid Gordon), and 10th in career hits (behind Kevin Youkilis). His nickname is K.P.

In high school at Chaminade College Prep, Pillar moved from the infield to the outfield in his junior year for the baseball team. He batted just under .400 for his high school career, with a high of .463 in his senior year. He also played on offense, defense, and special teams with the football team, as well as point guard on the basketball team, and earned first-team all-league honors in each sport.

== College career ==
Pillar attended California State University, Dominguez Hills, in Carson, California. He majored in and graduated with a degree in mathematics and business, and played center field for the Toros baseball team, for which he was an All-American. As a freshman in 2008 he hit .379, the fifth-highest average in the California Collegiate Athletic Association (he was also third in the league with 20 doubles, and fifth in the league with 17 steals), and was named to the All-CCAA 2nd team. As a sophomore in 2009 he batted .329 and was again named a 2nd-Team All-CCAA selection, while stealing 18 bases in 19 attempts.

In 2010, Pillar played summer league baseball for the Wisconsin Woodchucks of the Northwoods League.

In 2010, as a junior he set an NCAA Division II record at the school, with a 54-game hitting streak, five games more than the prior record. Eight times during the streak he kept it alive with a hit in his final at bat. Batting .379 for the season, he was also named a Rawlings/ABCA National Gold Glove Award winner, ESPN the Magazine/CoSIDA Academic 1st-team All-District, an Honorable Mention All-American by NCBWA, 1st-team Daktronics/NCAA, NCBWA and Rawlings/ABCA All-West Region, and 1st-team All-CCAA selection, giving him three All-CCAA honors in three years. In his senior year, he batted .369 with a 1.000 fielding percentage.

Pillar finished his college career as the school's all-time batting leader, with a .367 average.

== Professional career ==
=== Toronto Blue Jays ===
==== Minor leagues ====
Pillar was drafted by the Toronto Blue Jays in the 32nd round (979th overall) of the 2011 Major League Baseball draft. His signing bonus of $1,000 was so little, after taxes, that he needed to ask his mom for some additional money so that he could have enough to buy an iPhone. When he was promoted to the majors two years later, Blue Jays general manager Alex Anthopoulos said: "Clearly ... and I say that respectfully, we got him wrong. Just because, if he has a chance to get to the big leagues, you don't wait for the [32nd] round to select him."

Pillar played for the Bluefield Blue Jays in 2011, and batted .347 over 60 games, winning the Appalachian League batting title and leading the organization in batting average. He was also 4th in the league in hits (82), and 6th in slugging percentage (.534). He was named an Appalachian League All Star. He holds the team's all-time records for batting average, on-base percentage (.377), and slugging percentage. He was then called up to play for the Vancouver Canadians in its playoff run, and batted .391 to help the team win the Northwest League title.

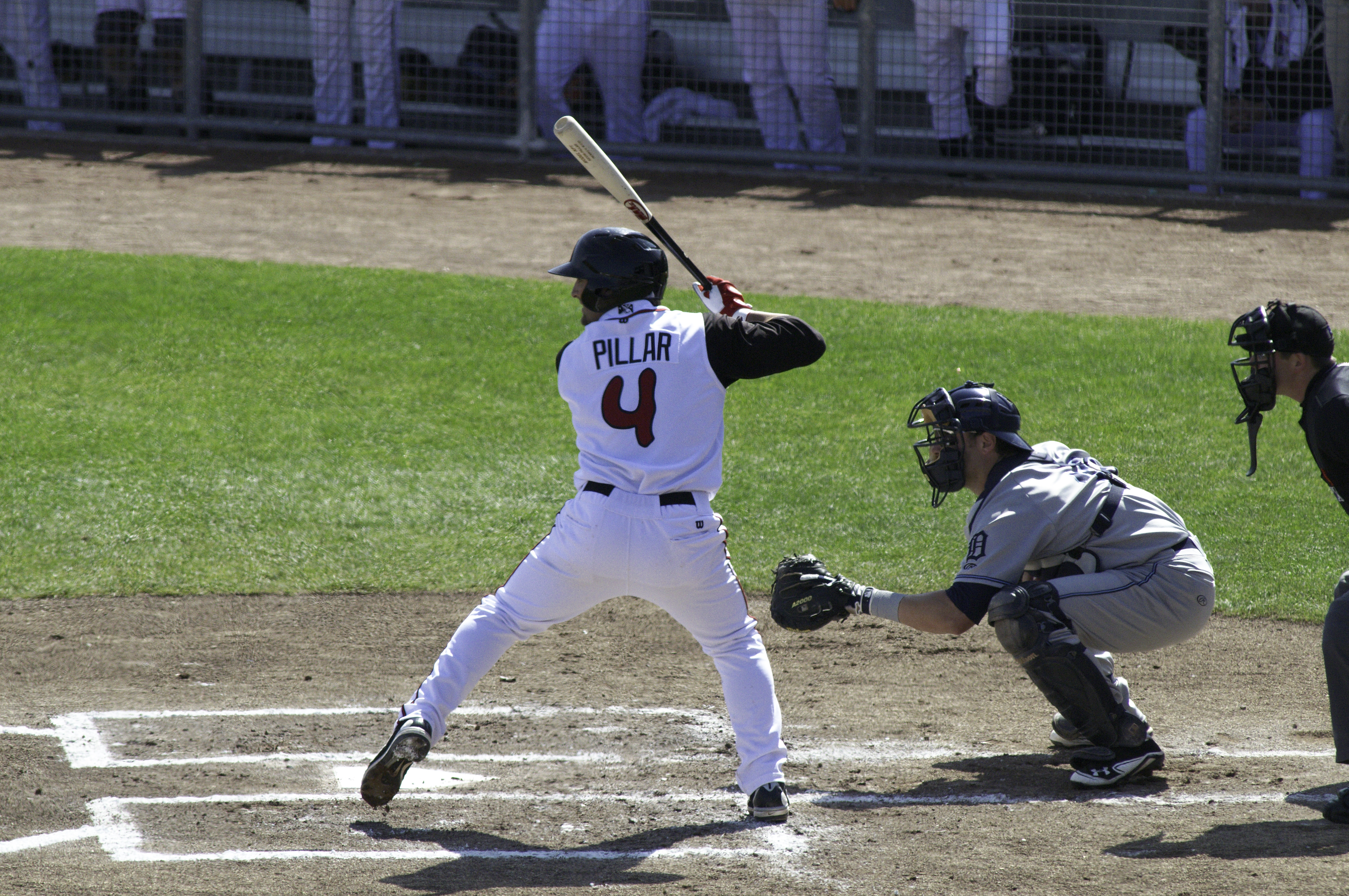
Pillar with the Lansing Lugnuts in 2012.

Pillar began the 2012 minor league season with the Single-A Lansing Lugnuts of the Midwest League, where he recorded a .322 batting average (3rd in the league) with a .390 on base percentage (4th in the league), and stole 35 bases (5th in the league; while being caught 6 times) in 86 games. He was then promoted to the Advanced-A Dunedin Blue Jays, where he batted .323 and stole 16 bases (while being caught 3 times) in 42 games. His total of 51 steals in 2012 was the second-most in the Blue Jays organization, and 10th-most in the minor leagues. Considered an excellent defensive player, he played all three outfield positions. He was named the 2012 Midwest League Most Valuable Player, after also garnering mid-season and post-season All Star honors, and being named the best hitting prospect in the Midwest League by Baseball America. He was also named a Topps Class A All Star and an MiLB.com Organization All Star. He then played for the Salt River Rafters in the Arizona Fall League, batting a team-leading .371.

Pillar was promoted to the Double-A New Hampshire Fisher Cats before the start of the 2013 minor league season. He played 71 games for the team, and made 12 outfield assists. He was considered one of the most consistent hitters and defenders in the Eastern League, "with great instincts, a powerful and accurate throwing arm," and showed speed on the base paths. Richie Hebner, his hitting coach, said: "He is the best player in the league. He does everything well." He batted .313 (3rd in the league) with 5 home runs and 30 RBIs, and was leading the Eastern League with 95 hits, before he was promoted to the Triple-A Buffalo Bisons. Through his first 11 games, Pillar batted .391 and had more doubles (8) than singles (7). During his time in Buffalo he had more extra-base hits (27) than any other player in AAA over that timespan. In 123 games between New Hampshire and Buffalo, he had 39 doubles and 155 hits which, at the time of his August 2013 promotion, were the second- and third-highest totals, respectively, in the minor leagues. Buffalo manager Marty Brown said: "I am impressed with how he has swung the bat, for sure. But he also always seems to be in the right place at the right time defensively. He's a very heads-up baserunner."

Pillar was ranked the 16th-best prospect in the Blue Jays organization by MLB.com in July 2013. Pillar had not previously ranked in the top 20 on MLB.com's rankings. Baseball America ranked him as the team's 12th-best prospect. In 2013, his 155 hits in the minors led the organization for the second consecutive year. In December 2013, Baseball America designated him the "Best Hitter for Average" among the Blue Jays' prospects.

In 2014 with the Bisons he batted .323 (3rd in the league) in 100 games (missing 35 games during his two call-ups to the majors), leading the International League in doubles (39; second-most in the Bisons' modern era to Jhonny Peralta's 44 in 2004), 3rd in extra-base hits (52), and 5th in slugging percentage (.509) and stolen bases (27), with 10 home runs and 59 RBIs. Pillar had both a 21-game hitting streak (the longest in the league for the season) and an 18-game hitting streak, making him the first player in Buffalo's modern era to put together two hitting streaks of 18 games or more. He was named International Player of the Week twice (on May 5 and August 6), an International League post-season All-Star, and the 2014 Buffalo Bisons MVP.

In his minor league career through 2016, Pillar batted .324 with a slugging percentage of .479 and an OPS of .846 in 413 games.

==== 2013 ====
Pillar was called up to the Blue Jays for the first time in his career on August 14, 2013, after center fielder Colby Rasmus was placed on the 15-day disabled list and utility player Emilio Bonifacio was traded to the Kansas City Royals. He was the first member of Toronto's 2011 draft to reach the majors, and as of April 2015, was the lowest selection of his major league draft class to get to the majors. General manager Alex Anthopoulos stated that, at the time of his call-up, he considered Pillar a "legit center option".

Pillar made his major league debut that night against the Boston Red Sox. He was given uniform number 22. He was 0-for-4 with one strikeout, and made a diving catch in the outfield in the Blue Jays' 4–3 extra innings win. Pillar recorded his first career hit and RBI in a doubleheader against the New York Yankees on August 20. On August 24, Pillar hit his first career home run, a three-run shot off Houston Astros starter Brad Peacock.

==== 2014 ====
In 2014, after starting the season with the Blue Jays, Pillar was optioned to the Buffalo Bisons on March 22. He was called up to the Blue Jays on May 13, after Jonathan Diaz was optioned to Triple-A. Pillar had reached base safely in a league-high 26 straight games with Buffalo, and posted a triple slash of .305/.344/.461 in 34 games, while leading the league in doubles and leading Triple-A with an 18-game hitting streak.

On June 9, Pillar hit a walk-off single, scoring Erik Kratz to give the Blue Jays a 5–4 win over the Minnesota Twins. On June 24 he was sent back down to Buffalo for throwing his bat after manager John Gibbons removed him for pinch hitter Anthony Gose. He was recalled on August 26 when Nolan Reimold was designated for assignment.

==== 2015 ====
In the 2015 offseason, the Blue Jays acquired Michael Saunders from the Seattle Mariners, and Pillar was expected to compete for the fourth outfielder role heading into spring training. However, after Saunders tore his meniscus before the start of spring training Pillar stepped in as the starting left fielder.

Pillar made several highlight reel catches throughout the season, including scaling the left field wall to rob Tim Beckham of a home run on April 15. Blue Jays fans voted it the play of the year and Pillar called the catch a "life-changing moment" that brought him from obscurity to prominence in Toronto and around the league. On June 2, Pillar recorded his first career two-home run game, and became the first right-handed batter to hit two home runs in one game off of Washington Nationals' ace Max Scherzer. He was named the Blue Jays Player of the Month for June, as voted on by the Toronto Chapter of the Baseball Writers' Association of America (BBWAA), for a month in which he batted .365 (4th in the AL) with 5 stolen bases (tied for 7th in the AL) and 18 RBIs (tied for 10th in the AL). On September 28, Pillar was named the American League Player of the Week for September 21–27. He batted .524 with 2 home runs, 6 RBIs, and 5 stolen bases during that week.

Pillar played his first full Major League season in 2015 and set several career-highs. He finished the regular season batting .278 with 12 home runs, 56 RBIs, and 25 stolen bases (5th in the AL), as his 86.21 stolen base percentage was 4th-best in the league. On defense, he led all MLB outfielders in putouts. Pillar played in all 5 games of the 2015 American League Division Series against the Texas Rangers, and batted .333 with one home run and four RBIs. Pillar and the Blue Jays then lost the American League Championship Series in six games to the Kansas City Royals, who went on to win the World Series.

On October 29, Pillar was announced as a finalist for the Gold Glove award in center field, along with Kevin Kiermaier and Mike Trout, with the award eventually going to Kiermaier. On November 11, Pillar was named the 2015 Wilson Defensive Player of the Year for center field.

==== 2016 ====
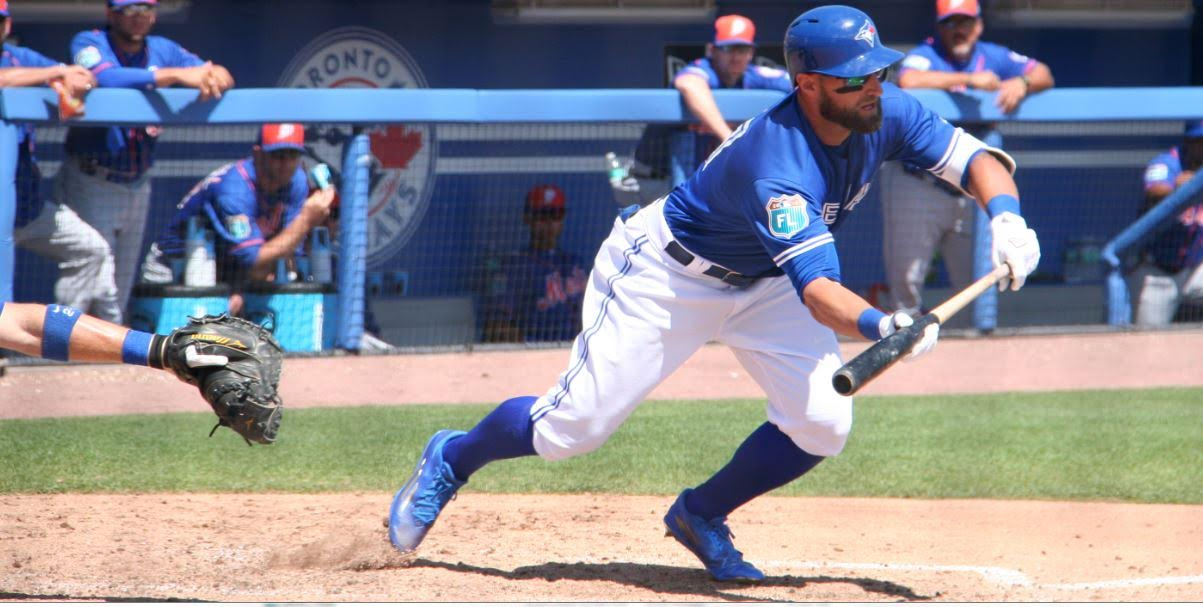
Pillar squaring for a bunt during 2016 spring training.

Pillar opened the season as the Blue Jays' lead-off hitter, but struggled, hitting .188 with no walks through April 16, and was moved down in the order by manager John Gibbons. In early August, Pillar was placed on the disabled list with a left thumb injury incurred while stealing a base; he later underwent offseason surgery to repair a torn thumb ligament. To that point in the season, Pillar had played in 109 of 112 games, and his 2.6 Wins Above Replacement (WAR) was second only to Josh Donaldson on the team. On September 6, Pillar was announced as the Blue Jays' nominee for the Roberto Clemente Award.

Pillar appeared in 146 games for the Blue Jays in 2016, and hit .266 with seven home runs, 53 RBIs, and 14 stolen bases. On defense, he ranked # 1 among major league center fielders with 21 Defensive Runs Saved and a UZR (Ultimate Zone Rating) of 21.4. He led all MLB center fielders in defensive value according to Fangraphs, and was only surpassed in defensive value by shortstops Brandon Crawford and Francisco Lindor. Pillar struggled with the bat in the postseason, going 3-for-32 at the plate with one home run and two RBIs.

Pillar was named as a finalist for the Gold Glove Award in center field, along with Jackie Bradley Jr. and Kevin Kiermaier. On October 28, he was awarded the Fielding Bible Award for the center field position.

==== 2017 ====
On February 8, 2017, Pillar was announced as the cover athlete for the Canadian version of R.B.I. Baseball 17. During the offseason, Pillar worked to improve his plate discipline, with the goal of becoming the lead-off hitter for the Blue Jays. Early in the season, he split time at the lead-off role with Devon Travis; however, Travis struggled in the role and Pillar became the everyday lead-off hitter in late April. On May 13, Pillar became the American League leader in hits with 47, after a 3-for-4 performance against the Seattle Mariners. The following day, Pillar hit the first walk-off home run of his career, a solo shot off Mariners closer Edwin Díaz to give Toronto a 3–2 victory.

In the Blue Jays’ 8–4 loss to the Atlanta Braves on May 17, Braves pitcher Jason Motte struck out Pillar with a quick pitch. Pillar then called Motte a homophobic slur, Motte and Braves catcher Kurt Suzuki confronted him, and both dugouts rushed onto the field. Following the game, Pillar publicly apologized to Motte. The next day, the Blue Jays held a press conference at which Pillar apologized again, and the team announced that Pillar would be suspended for two games; he was also fined an undisclosed amount by MLB.

For the 2017 season, Pillar batted .256/.300/.404 with career-highs in doubles (37) and home runs (16), as he scored 72 runs and stole 15 bases. His .997 fielding percentage as a center fielder was the best in the league, and his eight assists as a center fielder were second-most in the AL. On October 28, he was named a center field Gold Glove award finalist.

==== 2018 ====
On January 12, 2018, Pillar signed a one-year, $3.25 million contract with the Blue Jays, avoiding salary arbitration. In Toronto's 5–3 victory over the New York Yankees on March 31, Pillar became the first Blue Jay to steal three bases in one inning, when he stole second, third, and home plate in the eighth. It was also the team's first successful straight steal of home since Aaron Hill did so in 2007. On July 1 he made a wall-leaping home-run-robbing catch that was rated the # 2 defensive play of the year on MLB Network's "Top 100 Plays of 2018". He was placed on the disabled list on July 15 after spraining his right sternoclavicular joint (where his collarbone attaches to his chest wall) on a diving catch.

Pillar finished the 2018 season leading the team in batting average (.252), doubles (40; a career high), and stolen bases (14), while coming in 10th in the American League in stolen-base percentage (83.25%). He also hit 15 home runs and 59 RBIs. With the team trading pitcher Aaron Loup during the season, Pillar became – at 29 years of age – the longest-tenured active Blue Jay.

In the fall of 2018, Pillar played as an MLB All-Star in the 2018 MLB Japan All-Star Series, batting .333 in 12 at bats.

==== 2019 ====
In January 2019, Pillar signed a one-year, $5.8 million contract with the Blue Jays, avoiding arbitration. He played five games for the team in 2019 before being traded. He concluded his Toronto career with a seven-year stolen base percentage of 75.82%, 8th-best all-time of all Blue Jays.

=== San Francisco Giants (2019) ===
On April 2, 2019, the Blue Jays traded Pillar to the San Francisco Giants for Alen Hanson, Derek Law, and Juan De Paula. Pillar hit his first career grand slam against the San Diego Padres on April 8. On May 4, Pillar earned an MLB Play of the Week award catching Nick Senzel's would-be home run by scaling the center field wall. Pillar assumed the position of everyday center fielder, as Steven Duggar's continued injury problems forced him into a few stints on the injured list. On August 17, Pillar had a career-high 5 hits against the Arizona Diamondbacks.

For the 2019 season with the Giants, he batted .264/.293/.442 with 37 doubles (8th in the NL), 21 home runs, 87 RBIs, and 6 sacrifice flies (8th) while stealing 14 bases; his 161 games played for the season were 6th in the majors, while his 6.9 at bats per strikeout were 7th. On defense, he was 3rd in the league in both his range factor/game as an outfielder (2.30) and his fielding percentage as a center fielder (.986). He led the Giants (or tied for the lead) in runs, doubles, triples, home runs, RBIs, and stolen bases.

In September, Pillar received the Willie Mac Award, given to the team's most inspirational player, as voted on by players, coaches, trainers, and fans. In November, Pillar received one vote for 2019 National League Most Valuable Player. San Francisco opted not to tender Pillar a contract on December 2, 2019, making him a free agent.

=== Boston Red Sox (2020) ===
On February 14, 2020, Pillar signed a one-year, $4.25 million contract with the Boston Red Sox. With the Red Sox during the first half of the delayed-start 2020 season, Pillar batted .274 in 117 at bats over 30 games with 20 runs, seven doubles, two triples (3rd in the AL at the time of the trade), four home runs, and 13 RBIs. On defense he played error-less baseball and had two assists from right field (3rd), as he played 24 games in right field, six games in center field, and two games in left field.

=== Colorado Rockies (2020) ===
At the trade deadline of the 2020 season, August 31, Boston traded Pillar to the Colorado Rockies in exchange for pitcher Jacob Wallace.

In 2020 for Colorado, Pillar batted .308/.351/.451 with 2 home runs, 14 runs, and 13 RBIs in 91 at bats. On defense he played almost exclusively center field.

In the pandemic-shortened 2020 season, between Boston and Colorado combined, Pillar batted .288/.336/.462 with 6 home runs, 34 runs, and 26 RBIs in 206 at bats.

=== New York Mets (2021) ===
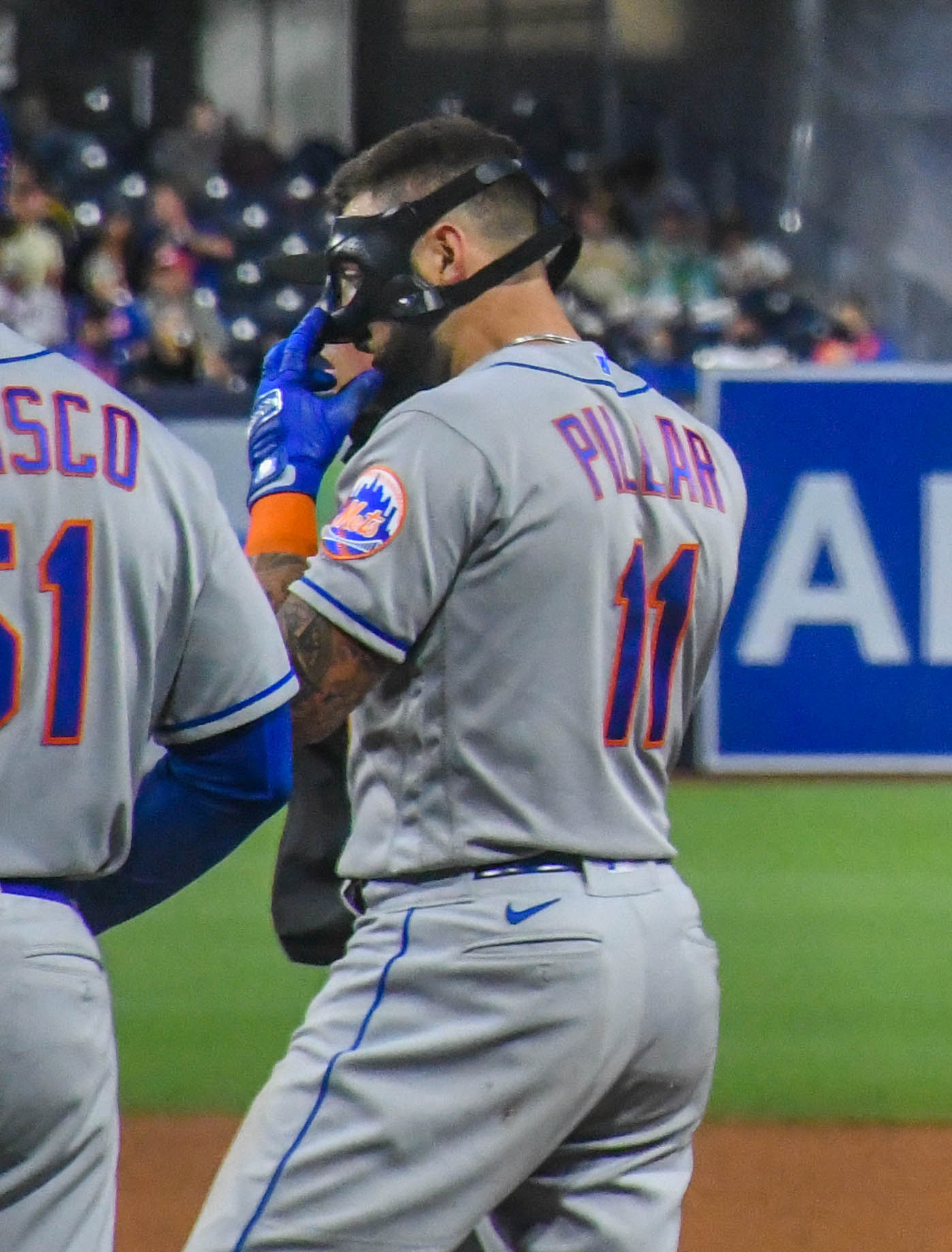
Pillar with the Mets in 2021

On February 21, 2021, Pillar signed a one-year, $5 million contract with the New York Mets with player and club options for 2022. The contract guaranteed Pillar $3.6 million in 2021 with a player option worth $2.9 million with no buyout, and a club option worth $6.4 million with a $1.4 million buyout.

On May 17, 2021, Pillar was struck in the face by a 94 miles per hour (151 km/h) fastball thrown by Atlanta Braves pitcher Jacob Webb in a game at Truist Park, with the bases loaded, forcing in a run. Pillar immediately suffered severe bleeding, and was removed from the game. He posted on his Twitter account after the incident: "Thanks to everyone that has reached out! Scary moment but I’m doing fine! #RBI #gamewinner". Pillar suffered "multiple nasal fractures," and was placed on the 10-day injured list. He was activated from the injured list on May 31, and hit a single in his first plate appearance since the injury. Pillar said that he would wear a protective mask in the field and on the bases for several weeks after returning. After initially wearing a clear mask, he switched to a black mask designed using face-scanning software, which improved his vision.

In 2021 with the Mets, Pillar batted .231/.277/.415 with 15 home runs (4th on the Mets) and 47 RBIs in 325 at bats. With runners in scoring position, he batted .300/.352/.588. On defense he played error-less baseball, as he played 57 games in center field, 52 games in left field, 22 games in right field, and pitched in one game (retiring the one batter he faced).

=== Los Angeles Dodgers (2022) ===
On March 22, 2022, Pillar signed a minor league contract with the Los Angeles Dodgers. He began the season with the AAA Oklahoma City Dodgers, batting .315/.412/.622 in 127 at bats. Pillar was called up to the majors on May 28. He had one hit (a double) in 12 at bats for the Dodgers.

On June 1, 2022, Pillar fractured his left shoulder sliding into third base in a game against the Pittsburgh Pirates, stayed in the game and scored on a groundout, and was subsequently placed on the injured list. He underwent successful surgery on June 7. He worked his way back post-surgery, and played in six minor league rehab games at the end of September, batting 7-for-22 with a home run and six RBIs. For the 2022 season with Oklahoma City, he batted .315(8th in the Pacific Coast League)/.398/.604(6th) in 149 at bats with 42 runs, 10 home runs, 40 RBIs, 20 walks, and 22 strikeouts, playing primarily center field.

=== Atlanta Braves (2023) ===
On January 18, 2023, Pillar signed a minor league contract with the Atlanta Braves organization, with his contract stipulating that he would earn $3 million if he were to be put on the Braves major league roster. On March 30, Pillar had his contract selected by the Braves after making the Opening Day roster. He hit his 100th career home run in a game against the Baltimore Orioles on May 5.

In 2023, Pillar batted .228/.248/.416 in 197 at bats, with 9 home runs and 32 RBIs, as he stole four bases in five attempts. He played 64 games in left field, 13 games in right field, and 3 games in center field.

=== Chicago White Sox (2024) ===
On February 2, 2024, Pillar signed a minor league contract with the Chicago White Sox, and was a non-roster invitee to spring training. He was to earn a $3 million base salary if he were put on the team's major league roster. Pillar was released by Chicago on March 22; however, two days later he was re-signed by the team to a major league contract. In 17 games for the White Sox, he went 4–for–25 (.160) with one home run, four RBI, and two stolen bases. On April 26, Pillar was designated for assignment following the promotion of Tommy Pham. He cleared waivers and was sent outright to the Triple–A Charlotte Knights on April 28; however, he rejected the assignment and subsequently elected free agency.

=== Los Angeles Angels (2024) ===
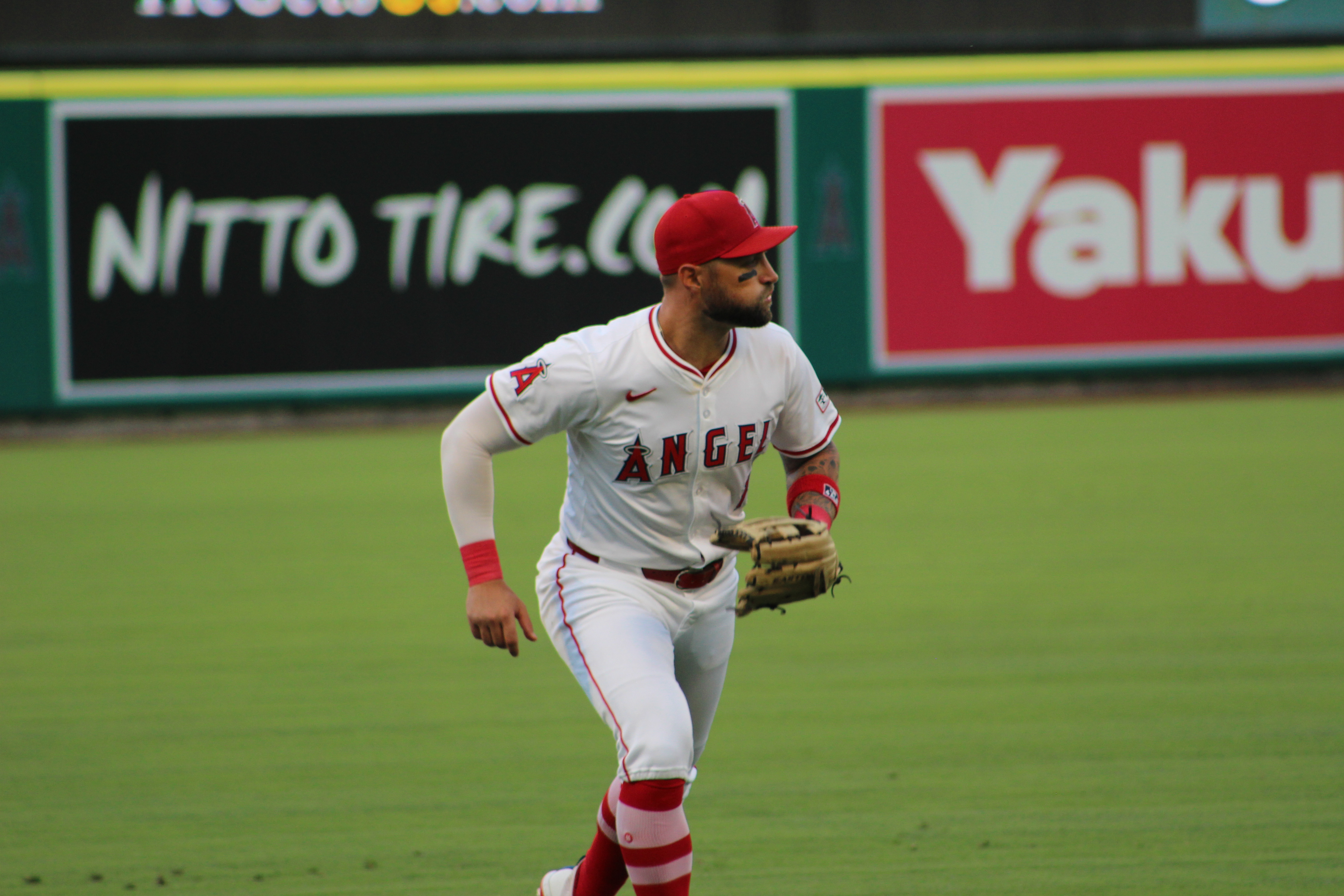
Pillar with the Angels in 2024

On April 30, 2024, Pillar signed a major league contract with the Los Angeles Angels following an injury to Mike Trout. On May 15 against the St. Louis Cardinals, he recorded his 100th career stolen base. On May 19, while facing the Texas Rangers in a pinch-hit at bat, Pillar recorded his 1,000th career hit. On July 6, Pillar attained 10 years of major league service time. He also revealed that he would likely retire at the end of the 2024 season.

In 2024 for the Angels, Pillar batted .236/.291/.378 with 7 home runs, 37 runs, and 41 RBIs in 259 at-bats. He played 46 games in center field, 19 games in left field, and 12 games in right field. In 2024 between Chicago and Los Angeles combined, Pillar batted .229/.291/.377 with 8 home runs, 38 runs, and 45 RBIs in 284 at-bats, as he stole 12 bases in 15 attempts. With runners in scoring position he batted .329/.379/.500, with runners in scoring position and two outs he batted .371/.450/.543, and facing left-handers he batted .310/.352/.500.

=== Texas Rangers (2025) ===
On February 23, 2025, Pillar signed a minor league contract with the Texas Rangers. On March 26, the Rangers selected Pillar's contract after he made the team's Opening Day roster. In 20 appearances for Texas in 2025, he batted .209/.209/.256 with one home run, three RBI, and three stolen bases, while primarily playing center field. Pillar was designated for assignment following the promotion of Alejandro Osuna on May 25. He was released by the Rangers on May 31.

On July 2, 2025, Pillar announced his retirement from professional baseball.

== Honors ==
In 2018, Pillar was inducted into the Southern California Jewish Sports Hall of Fame. In 2026, Pillar was inducted into the National Jewish Sports Hall of Fame.

== Personal life ==
Pillar married his college sweetheart, Amanda Gulyas, in October 2014. His wife gave birth to a daughter, Kobie, in October 2017. She was named after NBA star Kobe Bryant, one of Pillar's idols growing up. The couple's son and second child was born in April 2020.

== See also ==
- List of Jewish Major League Baseball players
- List of Jews in Sports
