= Ender Inciarte =

Venezuelan baseball player (born 1990)

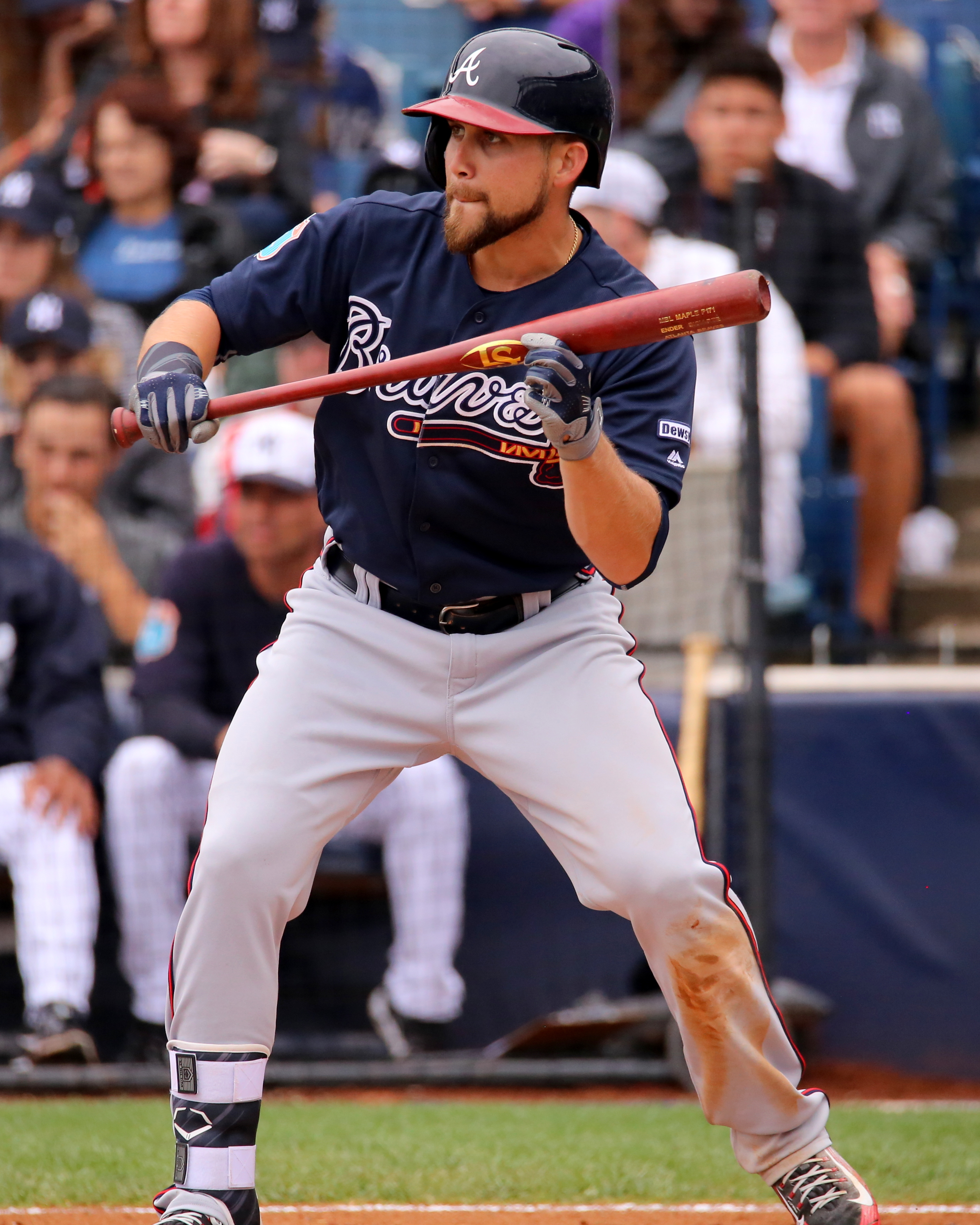
- Inciarte with the Atlanta Braves in 2016
- Center fielder
- Born: October 29, 1990 (age 36); Maracaibo, Zulia, Venezuela
- Batted: Left Threw: Left

MLB debut
- May 2, 2014, for the Arizona Diamondbacks

Last MLB appearance
- July 13, 2022, for the New York Mets

MLB statistics
- Batting average: .280
- Home runs: 42
- Runs batted in: 263
- Stats at Baseball Reference

Teams
- Arizona Diamondbacks (2014–2015); Atlanta Braves (2016–2021); New York Mets (2022)

Career highlights and awards
- All-Star (2017); 3× Gold Glove Award (2016–2018)

Ender David Inciarte Montiel (born October 29, 1990) is a Venezuelan former professional baseball center fielder. He played in Major League Baseball for the Arizona Diamondbacks, Atlanta Braves, and New York Mets. He made his MLB debut in 2014. He won the Fielding Bible Award in 2015, won the Gold Glove Award three times (2016–2018), and was an All-Star in 2017.

== Career ==
=== Arizona Diamondbacks ===
Inciarte signed as an international free agent with the Diamondbacks on May 25, 2008, and began his career in Rookie Ball in 2008 with the Arizona League Diamondbacks. During the 2012 season, he hit .307 with two home runs, 47 runs batted in, and 28 stolen bases while splitting time between the Class-A South Bend Silver Hawks and the Class-A Advanced Visalia Rawhide.

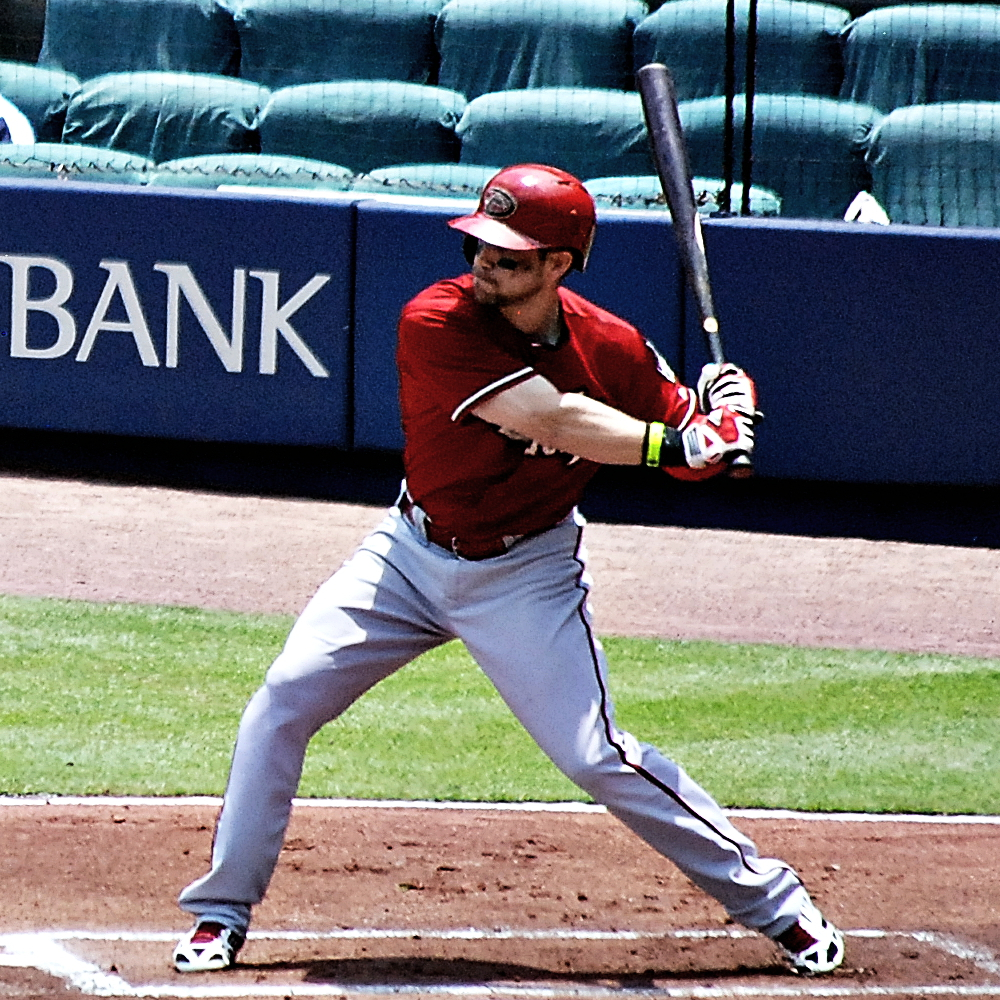
Inciarte batting for the Arizona Diamondbacks in 2014

Following the 2012 season, Arizona decided to not protect Inciarte on their 40-man roster; he was then selected by the Philadelphia Phillies with the 15th pick in the Rule 5 draft. He competed for a spot with the Phillies as a backup outfielder during spring training, and ultimately made their 2013 Opening Day roster. Following the first game of the season, however, Inciarte was designated for assignment without having made an appearance for the Phillies, after the team's acquisition of Ezequiel Carrera on April 2. Inciarte was then offered back to the Diamondbacks, as mandated by the Rule 5 rules. The Diamondbacks assigned him to the Mobile BayBears of the Class AA Southern League. With Mobile, Inciarte had a .281 batting average, five home runs, 17 doubles, 25 runs batted in, and 43 stolen bases. He appeared in the Southern League All-Star Game. After the season, the Diamondbacks added Inciarte to their 40-man roster.

Inciarte began the 2014 season with the Reno Aces of the Class AAA Pacific Coast League. He batted .312 with two home runs and seven stolen bases in 109 at-bats before being promoted to the major leagues. He made his major league debut on May 2, 2014, and recorded a hit in his first major league game. He hit his first major league home run on July 5 off of Aaron Harang of the Atlanta Braves. Inciarte batted .303 with 21 stolen bases for the Diamondbacks in 2015. After the 2015 season, Inciarte won the Fielding Bible Award for players who played multiple positions.

=== Atlanta Braves ===
On December 9, 2015, the Diamondbacks traded Inciarte, Dansby Swanson, and Aaron Blair to the Braves for Shelby Miller, and Gabe Speier. Inciarte started for the Braves as their center fielder and leadoff hitter on Opening Day. The Braves placed Inciarte on the disabled list on April 11. He was reactivated on May 6. The time he missed negatively impacted Inciarte's offensive production, as he recorded a .227 batting average in the first half of the season. After the All-Star break, Inciarte's hitting improved. He finished the year with a .291 batting average, coupled with three career-best marks, a .351 on-base percentage, a .381 slugging percentage, 85 runs scored, and seven triples. In 131 games, Inciarte also stole 16 bases. Though he finished behind Billy Hamilton in defensive Wins Above Replacement (as tabulated by Fangraphs), Ultimate Zone Rating, and Defensive Runs Saved, Inciarte won the 2016 National League Gold Glove for center fielders due to his superior arm strength and accuracy. On December 23, 2016, the Atlanta Braves announced that Inciarte had been signed to a five-year extension worth approximately $30 million.

On April 14, 2017, Inciarte recorded the first defensive out, first hit, and first home run at the Braves' new venue, SunTrust Park, in a 5–2 victory over the San Diego Padres. On May 22, 2017, Inciarte recorded his first career five-hit game, against the Pittsburgh Pirates in a 5–2 Braves victory. Weeks later, on June 4, 2017, Inciarte recorded his second five-hit performance, as well as his first 5-RBI game, in a 13–8 win against the Cincinnati Reds. He was the only Brave selected to the 2017 Major League Baseball All-Star Game. Inciarte hit two home runs and stole two bases against the Colorado Rockies on August 17, 2017, becoming only the 17th player—and third Brave—to have a multi-homer, multi-steal game since 1901. He recorded his first 200-hit season on September 26, with a double in the first inning against the New York Mets. At the end of the year, Inciarte won the National League Rawlings Gold Glove Award for center fielders for the second time in his career. In 2018, Inciarte's defense in center field continued to impress, en route to his third consecutive Gold Glove award. He hit .265/.325/.380 with ten home runs, 61 RBIs, and 28 stolen bases.

In 2019, injuries to his torso and hamstring limited Inciarte to 65 games. He hit .246/.343/.397 with 5 home runs and 24 RBIs in 199 at bats.

In 2020 he batted .190/.262/.250 with 17 runs, one home run, and 10 RBIs in 116 at bats. He had the lowest average exit velocity of any major league batter, at 78.2 mph, and the lowest percentage of hard hit balls, at 6.4%.

In 79 at-bats in 2021 for the Braves, Inciarte hit .215 with 2 home runs and 10 RBIs, missing time with a strained hamstring and a COVID-19 injured list stint. On July 24, 2021, Inciarte was designated for assignment by the Braves. On July 29, Inciarte was released by the Braves.

=== Cincinnati Reds ===
On August 5, 2021, Inciarte signed a minor league deal with the Cincinnati Reds. He was assigned to the Triple-A Louisville Bats. Inciarte made 15 appearances for Triple-A Louisville, hitting .288 with no home runs and 7 RBI's. On August 28, 2021, Inciarte was released by the Reds.

=== New York Yankees ===
On December 16, 2021, Inciarte signed a minor league contract with the New York Yankees. Inciarte played in 34 games for the Triple-A Scranton/Wilkes-Barre Railriders, hitting .252 with 4 home runs and 11 RBI's. On June 15, 2022, Inciarte was released by the Yankees.

=== New York Mets ===
On June 20, 2022, Inciarte signed a minor league contract with the New York Mets. On June 28, the Mets selected Inciarte's contract and added him to the Major League active roster. He was designated for assignment on July 14, 2022. He cleared waivers and was sent outright to the Triple-A Syracuse Mets on July 18. However, the next day he rejected the outright assignment and elected free agency.

== Personal life ==
Inciarte's father, Astolfo, played baseball in Venezuela. His brother, also named Astolfo, played in the minor leagues for the Diamondbacks organization, until their father died and he returned home to take over the family business. He is also a Real Madrid football club supporter. Inciarte played in the 2017 World Baseball Classic, representing his native country of Venezuela. In December 2020, Inciarte and Miss Universe 2009 winner Stefanía Fernández announced their relationship. Five months later, in May 2021, the couple welcomed their first child, a son.

== See also ==
- List of Major League Baseball players from Venezuela
