= Baseball Think Factory =

Baseball web site

Baseball Think Factory, abbreviated as BTF or BBTF, was a sabermetrically-oriented baseball web site which featured daily news stories in baseball, with original content contributed by SABR members such as Dan Szymborski. The site was previously branded as Baseball Primer, and was created in 2001 by the founders of Baseball-Reference. Contributors who have gone on to work for Major League Baseball front offices include Voros McCracken, Carlos Gomez, and Tom Tango. Bill James' Baseball Abstract books published in the 1980s are widely considered to be the modern predecessor to websites using sabermetrics such as baseballthinkfactory and baseballprospectus.

Baseball Think Factory shut down on December 15, 2023. A site for “refugees” of BBTF was established at https://hallofmerit.boards.net/

== History ==
The site was founded in 2001 by Jim Furtado and Sean Forman of Baseball-Reference under the name "Baseball Primer," with a matching URL of (http://www.baseballprimer.com/). It lasted until Furtado shut it down December 15, 2023.

The site's emphasis on sabermetric baseball analysis attracted members of the rec.sport.baseball Usenet groups, and later drew readers of Rob Neyer's ESPN columns. The early site cultivated spirited discussions as a result of the Usenet veterans' familiarity with each other and the fact that registration was not required to post comments. The site also featured a number of original research articles.

In 2004, the site was re-branded as "Baseball Think Factory" and was re-built on a different software platform in order to support the growing user population and accommodate user registration and content management features.

BTF mainly hosted baseball discussions. Sports Illustrated magazine listed the site as an "essential baseball destination," characterizing it as offering "links to significant baseball articles, accompanied by freewheeling, usually informed discussion threads." Michael Lewis also mentioned the site (as baseballprimer) in his book Moneyball.

== Site sections ==
The site featured a number of sections with content for different audiences. These include:

- Baseball Newsstand – a newsblog where baseball-related articles are linked. Entries usually feature an excerpt of the article along with a discussion thread.
- Hall of Merit (abbreviated as the HoM) – a sub-site conceived by Joe Dimino as an alternative to the National Baseball Hall of Fame in Cooperstown, New York. The purpose of the HoM is "to identify the best players in baseball history and thereby identify the omissions and errors that can be found in the other venerable institution." The discussions often appeal to sabermetric criteria, including in-depth understanding of the various historical eras of major league and negro league baseball as well as advanced statistics.
- Transaction Oracle – Szymborski posts analyses of major league transactions (player signings and trades), and articles on his ZiPS forecasting system, which is designed to forecast player statistics based on past performance and similarities to other major league players.
- Team Sites – sub-sections of the newsblog that link to articles of interest to specific teams. There currently are four such team blogs: Sox Therapy (Boston Red Sox), Gonfalon Cubs (Chicago Cubs), Count the Rings (New York Yankees), and It's Mets...Just Mets (New York Mets)
- Game "Chatters" – specific threads on the regular season and postseason major league baseball games (as well as for special events such as the Olympics or the World Baseball Championship). Site members contribute to the group liveblog during these events.
- Dialed In and Primate Studies – sub-sites with original baseball research and more in-depth discussion.

== Original research ==
BTF has featured numerous original research articles, primarily under the aforementioned sub-sites "Transaction Oracle," "Dialed In," and "Primate Studies." Several analysts such as Mitchel Lichtman and Tom Tango regularly posted original research articles and participated on discussion and criticism of the work at BTF before going on to establish their own sites and to publish results in book form.

Given that statistics characterizing major league offense (batting) are fairly well established, much of the research posted on BTF spotlight defense (fielding) in the form of statistics more accurate than traditional fielding statistics. Examples include:

=== Mitchel Lichtman's articles on ultimate zone rating ===
Lichtman created fielding metrics that use play-by-play records that record the location of individual batted balls. Lichtman combines this play-by-play data with his linear-weights system that assigns run values to the various baseball plays and their context within the game (inning, runners on base, score, etc.) Some of his initial articles on the system were posted on BTF.

Lichtman's Ultimate zone ratings (UZR) statistics can now be found on the baseball website Fangraphs.

=== ZiPS ===
Szymborski posts updates from his forecasting system known as "ZiPS" under his sub-site Transaction Oracle. ZiPS results are also used in his articles evaluating Major League Baseball transactions. These projections can also be found on Fangraphs, updated for in-season projections.

=== Chris Dial's Dialed In columns ===
Dial is a SABR member who contributes articles to BTF, many focusing on statistics measuring defense. Dial has studied STATS, Inc.'s "zone rating" for years and posts updated statistics based on this data and on Retrosheet data. Some of Dial's more notable articles include:

- Dial provides OPD – a statistic estimating a player's overall contribution on offense and defense. Offensive values were generated using Extrapolated Runs and defensive values are represented by Dial's DRS (defensive runs saved), which are based on ZR (zone rating) data.
- A reflection on generating statistics based on retrosheet play-by-play fielding data, the relative impact of including line drive (LD) data.
- Article on how to create a metric to measure a player's performance on defense, based on zone rating (ZR) data. Comparison to Mitchel Lichtman's UZR, which was taken to be the state-of-the-art fielding metric.

=== Carlos Gomez's Bullpen Mechanics ===
Gomez is a former college and professional pitcher who contributed articles featuring detailed, frame-by-frame analyses of pitcher mechanics. Prior to their publication, the average fan had little access to detailed evaluations of pitchers' mechanics and had to rely on short descriptions gleaned by beat reporters from scouting reports. The Arizona Diamondbacks organization offered him a position as a scout in 2007.
