= Dan Szymborski =

American writer of sabermetrics (born 1978)

Daniel John Szymborski
- Born: June 19, 1978; Baltimore, Maryland
- Occupations: Baseball writer and analyst
- Known for: ZiPS (SZymborski Projection System)

Daniel John Szymborski (born June 19, 1978, in Baltimore, Maryland) is an American writer of sabermetrics primarily known for his work with baseball projections and minor league translations.

Szymborski is a member of Society for American Baseball Research (SABR). He originally became known for contributions to BaseballPrimer.com, now known as Baseball Think Factory, after the site was featured by Time in 2002 and 2003's Moneyball by Michael Lewis. After developing his projection system, ZiPS (SZymborski Projection System) prior to the 2003 season, Szymborski became commonly quoted in print and web media as an expert in the field of baseball statistics. Currently, he is a contributor for ESPN and is a senior writer for FanGraphs.
