= Defensive Runs Saved =

Baseball statistic

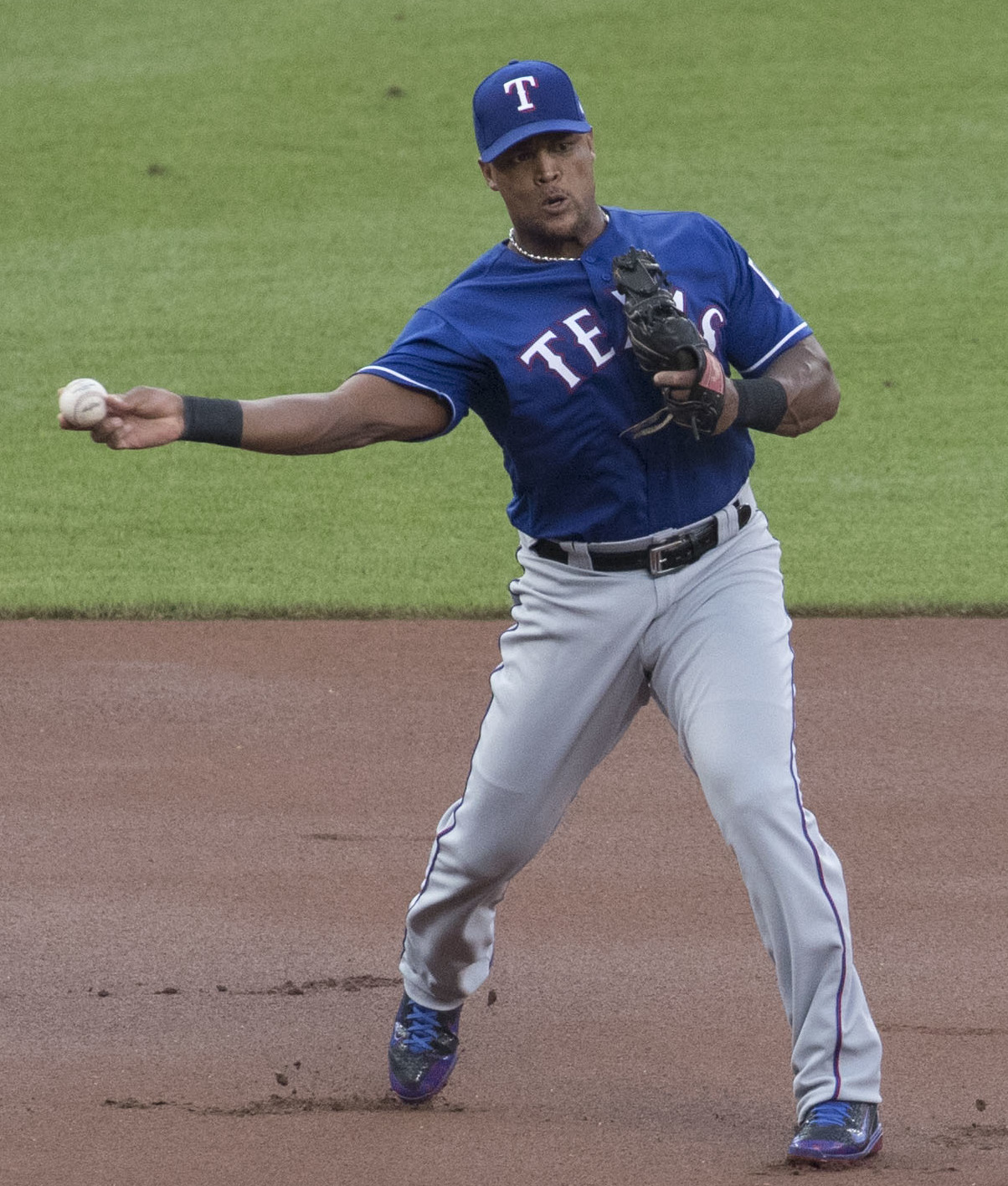
Adrián Beltré recorded the most defensive runs saved from 2003 to 2018.

In baseball statistics, defensive runs saved (DRS) measures the number of runs a player saved or cost his team on defense relative to an average player. Any positive number is above average, and the best fielders typically have a DRS figure of 15 to 20 for a season. The statistic was developed by Baseball Info Solutions and the data used in calculating it first became available for Major League Baseball (MLB) in 2003.

== Definition ==
Fielding percentage is the statistic that has traditionally been used to measure defensive ability, but it fails to account for a fielder's defensive range. Fielders who can cover a large area on defense are able to make plays that most players would not have the chance to make. DRS was created to take range into account when measuring a player's defensive ability.

In calculating DRS, points are either added or subtracted to a fielder's rating depending on whether or not they make a play on a ball that is hit towards them. For example, if a ball hit to the center fielder is expected to be caught 30 percent of the time, the fielder will lose .3 points if he does not catch it, or will gain .7 points if he does catch it. Each player's total points are later adjusted based on league averages, both with regard to average defensive performance, and with regard to how many runs a "point" equates to.

== Example ==
The table below shows a comparison between the top 10 shortstops in terms of fielding percentage and the top 10 shortstops in terms of defensive runs saved from 2003 to 2025 in MLB. Only three players, Andeltron Simmons, J. J. Hardy, and Trevor Story, are on both lists, showing that there is a difference in what the two statistics measure.

Top 10 shortstops (2003–2025)
Rank	Defensive runs saved	Fielding percentage
1.	Andrelton Simmons	Jimmy Rollins
2.	Adam Everett	J. J. Hardy
3.	Jack Wilson	Carlos Correa
4.	Brendan Ryan	Masyn Wynn
5.	Troy Tulowitzki	Andrelton Simmons
6.	J. J. Hardy	Francisco Lindor
7.	Clint Barmes	Jhonny Peralta
8.	Nick Ahmed	Dansby Swanson
9.	Trevor Story	Xander Bogaerts
10.	Cesar Izturis	David Eckstein

Sources: FanGraphs (DRS), FanGraphs (Fielding Percentage)

== Leaders ==
DRS statistics are only available starting in the 2003 MLB season. Thus, players of earlier eras who were noted for the defensive skills—such as third baseman Brooks Robinson and shortstop Ozzie Smith—were not evaluated in this manner. Baseball Reference uses DRS as part of its Wins Above Replacement (WAR) statistic, with older seasons using Total Zone Rating.

There is some variation in DRS as presented on baseball statistics websites—for example, Baseball Reference credits Adrián Beltré with 205 DRS for his career, while FanGraphs credits him with 200. The below figures are from FanGraphs.

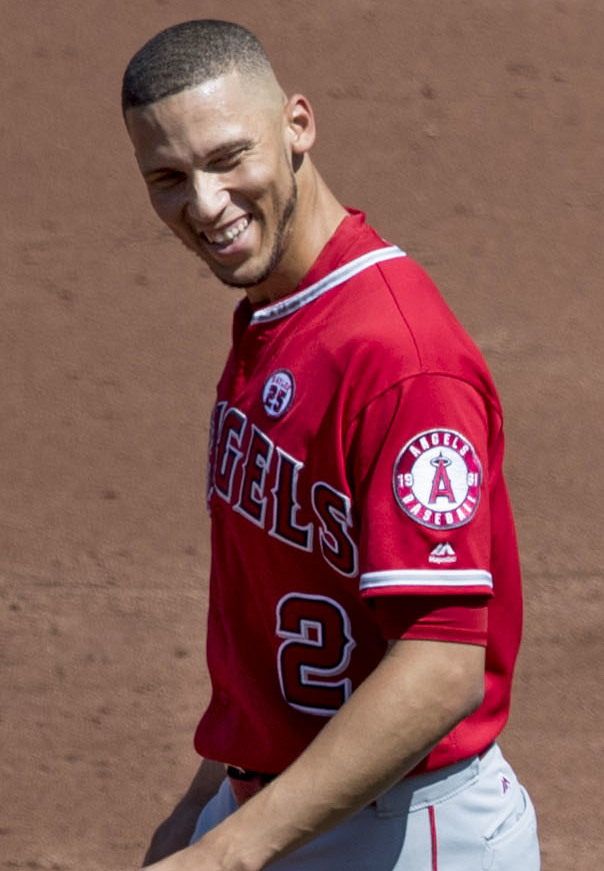
Andrelton Simmons, the single season and career leader in DRS.

=== Single season ===
Through the end of the 2025 MLB season, the highest DRS recorded in a single season was by shortstop Andrelton Simmons, who had 41 DRS in 2017, while the lowest DRS recorded in a single season at one position was by center fielder Matt Kemp, who had negative 33 DRS in 2010. Simmons' 2017 season ranks as the second best all-time defensive season according to Baseball Reference's defensive WAR, slightly behind Terry Turner in 1906.

=== Career ===
Through the end of the 2025 MLB season, the highest cumulative DRS for a career is 201 by shortstop Andrelton Simmons, slightly ahead of Adrián Beltré's 200. The lowest DRS for a career is -162 by shortstop Derek Jeter. Note that the totals only reflect 2003 onward, though Beltré and Jeter began their MLB careers earlier. Simmons is not among Baseball Reference's top 10 leaders in defensive WAR, trailing players who played all or most of their career before 2003.

== See also ==
- Ultimate zone rating
