= Wins above replacement =

Baseball statistic

Wins above replacement (WAR) or wins above replacement player (WARP) is a non-standardized sabermetric baseball statistic developed to sum up "a player's total contributions to his team". A player's WAR value is claimed to be the number of additional wins his team has achieved above the number of expected team wins if that player were traded for a replacement-level player: a player of common skills who may be added to the team for minimal cost and effort.

Individual WAR values are calculated from the number and success rate of on-field actions by a player (in batting, baserunning, fielding, and pitching), with higher values reflecting larger contributions to a team's success. WAR value also depends on what position a player plays, with more value going to key defensive positions like catcher and shortstop than positions with less defensive importance such as first base. A high WAR value built up by a player reflects successful performance, a large quantity of playing time, or both.

== Overview ==
The basis for a WAR value is the estimated number of runs contributed by a player through offensive actions such as batting and base running, and runs denied to opposition teams by the player through defensive actions like fielding and pitching. Statistics such as weighted on-base average (wOBA), ultimate zone rating (UZR), ultimate base running (UBR), and defense independent pitching statistics (DIPS) measure the effectiveness of a player at creating and saving runs for their team, on a per-plate appearance or per-inning basis. These statistics can be multiplied by the playing time of a player to give an estimate of the number of offensive and defensive runs contributed to their team.

Additional runs contributed to a team lead to additional wins, with 10 runs estimated to be equal to roughly one win. Therefore, a 1.0 WAR value for a player signifies a contribution of roughly 10 more runs than a replacement-level player, over a specified period of time. A replacement-level player is defined by FanGraphs as contributing 17.5 runs fewer than a player of league-average performance, over 600 plate appearances. Therefore, a 1.0 WAR player has contributed an estimated −7.5 runs relative to average over the same number of plate appearances, a 2.0 WAR player has contributed +2.5 runs, and a 5.0 WAR player has contributed +32.5 runs.

For an individual player, WAR values may be calculated for single seasons or parts of seasons, for several seasons, or across the whole career of the player. Collective WAR values for multiple players may also be estimated, for example to determine the contribution a team receives from its outfielders, its relief pitchers or from specific positions such as catcher. It is also possible to extrapolate a future WAR value from a player's past performance data.

== Calculation ==
No clearly established formula exists for WAR. Sources that provide the statistic calculate it differently. These include Baseball Prospectus, Baseball-Reference, and FanGraphs. All of these sources publish the method they use to calculate WAR, and all use similar basic principles to do so. The version published by Baseball Prospectus is named WARP, that by Baseball-Reference is named bWAR or rWAR ("r" derives from Rally or RallyMonkey, a nickname for Sean Smith, who implemented that site's version of the statistic) and that for Fangraphs is named fWAR. Compared to rWAR, the calculation of fWAR places greater emphasis on peripheral statistics.

WAR values are scaled equally for pitchers and batters; that is, pitchers and position players will have roughly the same WAR if their contribution to their team is deemed similar. However, the values are calculated differently for pitchers and position players: position players are evaluated using statistics for fielding, base running, and hitting, while pitchers are evaluated using statistics related to the opposing batters' hits, walks, and strikeouts in FanGraphs' version and runs allowed per 9 innings with a team defense adjustment for Baseball-Reference's version. Because the independent WAR frameworks are calculated differently, they do not have the same scale and cannot be used interchangeably in an analytical context.

=== Position players ===
==== Baseball-Reference ====
Baseball-Reference uses six components to calculate WAR for position players: batting runs (Rbat), baserunning runs (Rbaser), runs added or lost due to grounding into double plays in double play situations (Rdp), fielding runs (Rfield), positional adjustment runs (Rpos), and replacement level runs (Rrep). The first five factors are compared to league average, so a value of 0 represents an average player.

$$\text{bWAR} = \frac{(P_\text{runs} - A_\text{runs}) + (A_\text{runs} - R_\text{runs})}{\text{Runs per win}}$$

The term $P_\text{runs} - A_\text{runs}$ may be calculated from the first five factors (Rbat + Rbaser + Rdp + Rfield + Rpos), and the other term from Rrep. After each of these components is computed and summed, runs are converted to wins by dividing by a runs-per-win value determined using Pythagenpat.

- Rbat is based on Weighted Runs Above Average (wRAA), which in turn is calculated based on wOBA. However, Baseball-Reference uses a modified version of wOBA dubbed rOBA. Rbat is also adjusted for park and league factors.
- Rbaser is computed by considering expected runs from stolen bases. Additionally, Rbaser considers non-basestealing baserunning by comparing the player's baserunning results in specific scenarios to the league average, and multiplying those results by the expected number of runs per base (or runs per out).
- Rdp is computed by first finding the difference in the player's expected number of double plays (based on league average) and their actual number. This is multiplied by the expected difference in runs scored between grounding into a double play and not, which averages to 0.44 across seasons, but varies with the run environment.

$$\text{Rdp} = \text{Run expectancy} \times (\text{GIDP opportunities} \times \text{league GIDP rate} - \text{GIDP})$$

- Rfield uses DRS for the 2003 season and beyond, and Total Zone (TZ) for earlier seasons. Defensive Regression Analysis (DRA) is used for Negro League seasons.
- Rpos is calculated based on the player's position: +9 for a catcher, −9.5 for a first baseman, +3 for a second baseman, +2 for a third baseman, +7 for a shortstop, −7 for a left fielder, +2.5 for a center fielder, −7 for a right fielder, and −15 for a designated hitter. These values are set assuming 1,350 innings played (150 games of 9 innings). A player's positional adjustment is the sum of the positional adjustment for each position played by the player scaled to the number of games played by the player at that position, normalized to 1,350 innings. An additional adjustment is made so that the Rpos of all the players in the league sum to 0.
- Rrep is added to give the player credit for the additional runs a league average player would be expected to score over the same number of plate appearances compared to a replacement level player.

==== FanGraphs ====
Similarly to bWAR, FanGraphs uses six components to calculate fWAR for position players. These components are all on the scale of runs, and are then converted to wins based on a runs-per-win value that changes each season based on the run environment. The formula used is

$$\text{fWAR}= \frac{\text{Runs}_{batting}+ \text{Runs}_{baserunning}+ \text{Runs}_{fielding} + \text{Adj}_{position} + \text{Adj}_{league} + \text{Runs}_{replacement}}{\text{Runs Per Win}}$$

- Batting runs is based on wRAA, adjusted using park and league factors.
- As of 2024, $\text{Runs}_{baserunning} = \text{XBR} + \text{wSB}$, where XBR is Statcast's baserunning metric and wSB is Weighted Stolen Base Runs. For seasons prior to 2016, Ultimate Base Running (UBR) and Weighted Grounded into Double Plays (wGDP) are used in place of XBR when available.
- Fielding runs for non-catchers is based on either Outs Above Average (OAA) converted to runs above average, Ultimate Zone Rating (UZR), or Total Zone (TZ), depending on era. For catchers, depending on era, either Statcast metrics, a combination of Stolen Base Runs (rSB) and Catcher Framing (FRM), or TZ is used.
- The positional adjustment is calculated as follows, where adj is a run value dependent on the player's position: +12.5 for a catcher, −12.5 for a first baseman, +2.5 for a second or third baseman, +7.5 for a shortstop, −7.5 for a left or right fielder, +2.5 for a center fielder, and −17.5 for a designated hitter.

$$\text{Adj}_{position} = \frac{\text{Innings played}}{9 \times 162} \times \text{adj}$$

- The league adjustment is a minor adjustment (usually 0-5 runs per season) added so each league's runs above average balances out to zero.
- Finally, since all the previous run values are relative to league average, replacement runs are added to compare the player to a replacement level player.

==== Baseball Prospectus ====
Baseball Prospectus (BP) uses WARP (Wins Above Replacement Player). WARP relies on BP's proprietary set of statistics called "Deserved Runs", including DRA ("Deserved Runs Allowed") for pitchers and DRC ("Created") for batters. BP claims that DRC is the superior metric for comparing player performance when the player changes teams, and also when accounting for changes to the physical game ball year to year. The WARP formula for position players is

$\text{BWARP}= \frac{\text{BRAA}+ \text{BRR}+ \text{FRAA} + \text{POS}\_\text{ADJ} + \text{REP}\_\text{LEVEL}}{\text{RPW}}$

BRAA = "Batting Runs Above Average is the number of runs a hitter produces relative to an average hitter, adjusted for park."

BRR = "Baserunning Runs measures a player's contributions on the basepaths based on activity during the run of play, on stolen base attempts, from tag-up situations, and other advancement opportunities. BRR is calculated as the sum of various baserunning components: Ground Advancement Runs (GAR), Stolen Base Runs (SBR), Air Advancement Runs (AAR), Hit Advancement Runs (HAR) and Other Advancement Runs (OAR)."

FRAA = "Fielding Runs Above Average...measure(s) the defensive contributions made by players in the field."

- Infielders, outfielders, and catchers are evaluated differently.
- For outfielders, fielding impact is calculated by comparing their "assist opportunities" with the actual change in run expectancy on each play.
- Evaluating catchers includes measuring SRAA (Swipe Rate Above Average, or opponent base-stealing success) and TRAA (Takeoff Rate Above Average, or opponent base-stealing attempts), both of which are also used for calculations for baserunners and pitchers. Catchers are also evaluated by their "framing" skills (making balls outside of the strikezone appear to be strikes to the umpire) via CSAA (Called Strikes Above Average) as well as their skill at blocking errant pitches, via EPAA (Errant Pitches Above Average).

POS_ADJ = "The defensive value of the position a player plays, in total runs relative to the average player." BP does not make publicly available what values it uses for this adjustment.

REP_LEVEL = "The number of runs an average player would have produced relative to replacement level."

RPW = Runs Per Win.

The formula could then be written explicitly as

$\text{BWARP}= \frac{\text{runs prod relative to avg}_{parkadj}+ \text{baserunning}+ \text{fielding prod relative to avg} + \text{positional adj} + \text{replacement-level}}{\text{runs per win}}$

=== Pitchers ===
==== Baseball-Reference ====
Baseball-Reference uses two components to calculate WAR for pitchers: runs allowed (both earned and unearned) and innings pitched. These statistics are then used in a number of further calculations to better contextualize the numbers.

==== FanGraphs ====
Rather than focus on actual runs allowed, Fangraphs uses fielding independent pitching (FIP) as their main component to calculate WAR as they feel it better reflects the contributions of the pitcher.

As of 2017, the calculation of pitching fWAR is summarized as

$\text{fWAR} = \left(\frac{\text{lgFIPR9}-\text{pFIPR9}}{\text{dRPW}} + \text{rep}\right) \times \frac{\text{IP}}{9} \times \text{LIM} + \text{lgCorr}$

- lgFIPR9 and pFIPR9 are modified versions of league and player FIP, respectively. Unlike standard FIP, these values treat infield fly balls as strikeouts, are scaled with respect to RA9 instead of ERA, and are park adjusted. As of 2019, catcher framing is also considered for seasons with framing data. The difference between league and player FIP gives the pitcher's runs above average per 9 innings (RAAP9).
- dRPW (dynamic runs per win) converts RAAP9 to wins per game above average. The exact value of dRPW varies between players since pitchers directly influence their run environment.
- rep is added to give the pitcher credit for the number of wins expected from a replacement level pitcher.
- LIM is a leverage index multiplier applied for relievers.
- lgCorr is a minor correction to ensure WAR for all MLB pitchers sums to 430 each season.

==== Baseball Prospectus ====
Baseball Prospectus (BP) uses WARP (Wins Above Replacement Player). WARP relies on BP's proprietary set of statistics called "Deserved Runs", including DRA ("Deserved Runs Allowed") for pitchers and DRC ("Created") for batters. DRA was found to accurately account for 72% of variance in pitcher performance, compared to 50% with Fielding Independent Pitching (FIP). The "environmental factors" beyond the pitcher's control which are evaluated include, for example, batter handedness, the identity of the umpire, and the temperature of the game at the time of the first pitch.

== History ==
While it's not clear where the concept of "replacement level" originated, WAR has its roots in several early sabermetric statistics. In 1982, Bill James ranked players by "Offensive and Defensive Winning Percentage" and used a de facto replacement percentage to fill in data for part-time players. He used the term "replacement-level" explicitly the following year. James calculated that player with a .350 "winning percentage" was replacement-level. In his Historical Baseball Abstract, James writes

The line against which a player's value should be measured is the replacement level. The replacement level is a very real, very tangible place for a baseball team or a baseball player; drop under it and they release you. But nothing happens to you if you're a little better than average or a little worse than average.

By 1987, James started referring to "runs above replacement." James then converted the data to "wins", though without using the term "wins above replacement."

In the late 80s and early 90s, the publication Big Bad Baseball Annual ranked players based on WAR (and used the acronym).

In 1992, Brock Hanke used the term "Wins Above Replacement" in the publication The Baseball Sabermetric.

In 2002, Clay Davenport (co-founder of Baseball Prospectus) introduced an early version of WARP. Keith Woolner created VORP (Value Over Replacement Player), which focused exclusively on offensive value.

Mitchel Lichtman (also known as "MGL"), inventor of the baseball defense statistic UZR (Ultimate Zone Rating), created SuperLWTS ("linear weight subset"), which included baserunning and fielding on a play-by-play basis. SuperLWTS was in turn influenced by Pete Palmer (known primarily as the inventor of On-base Plus Slugging, or "OPS") and his systems Linear Weights and Total Player Rating.

== Analysis ==
In 2009, Dave Cameron stated that fWAR does an "impressive job of projecting wins and losses". He found that a team's projected record based on fWAR and that team's actual record has a strong correlation (correlation coefficient of 0.83), and that every team was within two standard deviations (σ=6.4 wins).

In 2012, Glenn DuPaul conducted a regression analysis comparing the cumulative rWAR of five randomly selected teams per season (from 1996 to 2011) against those teams' realized win totals for those seasons. He found that the two were highly correlated, with a correlation coefficient of 0.91, and that 83% of the variance in wins was explained by fWAR (R^{2}=0.83). The standard deviation was 2.91 wins. The regression equation was:

$$\text{Wins} = 52.7 + 0.97*\text{rWAR}$$

which was close to the expected equation:

$$\text{Wins} = 52 + \text{rWAR}$$

in which a team of replacement-level players is expected to have a .320 winning percentage, or 52 wins in a 162-game season.

To test fWAR as a predictive tool, DuPaul executed a regression between a team's cumulative player WAR from the previous year to the team's realized wins for that year. The resultant regression equation was:

$$\text{Wins} = 63.83 + 0.68*\text{fWAR}$$

which has a statistically significant correlation of 0.59, meaning that 35% (the square of 0.59) of the variance in team wins could be accounted for by the cumulative fWAR of its players from the previous season.

== Usage ==
WAR is recognized as an official stat by Major League Baseball and by the Elias Sports Bureau, and ESPN publishes the Baseball-Reference version of WAR on its own statistics pages for position players and pitchers.

The importance of WAR compared to typical statistical categories has been the subject of ongoing debate.

For example, nearing the end of the 2012 Major League Baseball season and afterward, there was much debate about which player should win the Major League Baseball Most Valuable Player Award for the American League. The two candidates considered by most writers were Miguel Cabrera, who won the Triple Crown, and Mike Trout, who led Major League Baseball in WAR. The debate focused on the use of traditional baseball statistics, such as RBIs and home runs, compared with sabermetric statistics such as WAR.

Cabrera led the American League in batting average, home runs, and RBIs, but Trout was considered a more complete player by some. Relative to the average player, Cabrera contributed an extra 53.1 runs through batting, but −8.2 through defense and −2.9 through baserunning, while Trout contributed 50.1 batting runs, 13.0 defensive runs, and 12.0 baserunning runs. Cabrera, the only one of the two players whose team entered the postseason, won the award in a landslide, with 22 of 28 first-place votes from the Baseball Writers' Association of America. He and Trout posted similar seasons in 2013; Cabrera again won the MVP. Dave Cameron disagreed, in a FanGraphs article:

Over the last two years, we have seen two of the very best seasons in baseball history, and they've gone essentially unrecognized by the organization that has been tasked with recording history. We have been lucky enough to see an in-his-prime Mickey Mantle in modern times, and instead of celebrating that, we’ve spent Novembers explaining why his teammates' inferiority should keep him from winning an individual award.

=== Criticisms ===
Bill James states that there is bias favoring players from earlier eras because there was greater variance in skill levels at the time, so "the best players were further from the average than they are now". That is, in modern baseball, it is more difficult for a player to exceed the abilities of his peers than it was in the 1800s and the dead-ball and live-ball eras of the 1900s. James's criticism originates from the evolutionary biologist Stephen Jay Gould who, in 1996, published the book Full House which argued the same point with respect to batting averages. The bias mentioned by Gould and James was confirmed in a statistical study which showed that ranking lists based on WAR do in fact include too many players from the earlier eras. This study challenges the stance that WAR properly adjusts for era differences.

James's criticism has also stemmed from the application and usage of WAR in recent years. In the 2017 Major League Baseball season, there was debate similar to 2012 regarding who should be the recipient of the American League Most Valuable Player Award: Jose Altuve or Aaron Judge. Judge outranked Altuve in FanGraphs' calculation of WAR that season, finishing first with a WAR of 8.2, to Altuve's 7.5. Based on Baseball-Reference's calculation, Altuve had the edge, 8.3 to 8.1. However, in James's words, the usage of WAR in this particular MVP argument was "...nonsense. Aaron Judge was nowhere near as valuable as Jose Altuve…. It is not close. The belief that it is close is fueled by bad statistical analysis.” He goes on to say that WAR,“...is dead wrong because the creators of that statistic have severed the connection between performance statistics and wins, thus undermining their analysis.” He goes on to point out that Judge performed worse than Altuve in critical situations, such as the late innings of close games, and that WAR does not properly take this into account. Other advanced statistics such as RE24 suggest the opposite, with Judge at 50.91 and Altuve at 38.76.

=== Alternatives to WAR ===
Some sabermetricians "have been distancing themselves from the importance of single-season WAR values" because some of the defensive metrics incorporated into WAR calculations have significant variability. For example, during the 2012 season, the Toronto Blue Jays employed an infield shift against some left-handed batters, such as David Ortiz or Carlos Peña, in which third baseman Brett Lawrie would be assigned to shallow right field. This resulted in a very high Defensive Runs Saved (DRS) total for Lawrie, and hence a high rWAR, which uses DRS as a component. Ben Jedlovec, an analyst for DRS creator Baseball Info Solutions, said that Lawrie was "making plays in places where very few third basemen are making those plays" because of the "optimal positioning by the Blue Jays". Another fielding metric, Ultimate Zone Rating (UZR), uses the DRS data but excludes runs saved as a result of a shift.

Jay Jaffe adapted WAR for a statistic he developed in 2004 called "Jaffe Wins Above Replacement Score," or JAWS. The metric averages a player's career WAR with their seven-year peak WAR (not necessarily consecutive years). The final number is then used to measure the player's worthiness of being inducted into the Baseball Hall of Fame by comparing it to the average JAWS of Hall of Fame players at that position. Baseball-Reference's explanation of JAWS says, "The stated goal is to improve the Hall of Fame's standards, or at least to maintain them rather than erode them, by admitting players who are at least as good as the average Hall of Famer at the position, using a means via which longevity isn't the sole determinant of worthiness."

For example, as of April 2025, third baseman Adrián Beltré accumulated 93.7 career WAR, and 48.9 WAR from his best seven seasons combined. Averaged together, these numbers give Beltré a JAWS of 71.3.

== See also ==
- List of Major League Baseball career WAR leaders
- Value over replacement player – another metric for measuring player contribution

== General references ==
- Brookover, Bob (November 16, 2012). "Mike Trout or Miguel Cabrera for MVP: It's a close call". Philly.com. Interstate General Media. Archived from the original on March 3, 2016.
- Cameron, Dave (December 30, 2008). "Win Values Explained: Part Three". FanGraphs.
- Cameron, Dave (October 7, 2009). "WAR: It Works". FanGraphs.
- Darowski, A. (November 29, 2010). "Are fWAR and rWAR on Different Scales?". Beyond the Box Score. Vox Media.
- DuPaul, Glenn (August 8, 2012). "What is WAR good for?". The Hardball Times.
- Eck, Daniel J. (2020). "Challenging Nostalgia and Performance Metrics in Baseball". Chance.
- Eck, Daniel J. (November 20, 2020). "Challenging WAR and Other Statistics as Era-Adjustment Tools". FanGraphs.
- Hartnett, Sean (October 4, 2012). "Cabrera Vs. Trout — Sorting Through The Great 2012 AL MVP Debate". CBS New York.
- Jedlovec, Ben (July 29, 2012). "How Brett Lawrie beat the numbers". ESPN.
- Kaufman, King; Tan, Cecilia M., eds. (2012). Baseball Prospectus 2012 (3 ed.). John Wiley & Sons. ISBN 9781118197691.
- Lott, John (May 5, 2012). "Blue Jays, Brett Lawrie lead the majors in 'saving' runs". National Post.
- MacAree, Graham. "What is Replacement Level?". FanGraphs.
- Wyers, Colin (May 30, 2012). "Manufactured Runs". Baseball Prospectus.
- Rosenberg, Michael (November 15, 2012). "The case for Miguel Cabrera over Mike Trout for AL MVP". Sports Illustrated. Archived from the original on November 17, 2012.
- Schoenfield, David (July 19, 2012). "What we talk about when we talk about WAR". SweetSpot. ESPN.
- "WAR Comparison Chart". Baseball Reference.
- "Baseball-Reference.com WAR Explained". Baseball Reference.
- "Pitcher WAR Calculations and Details". Baseball Reference.
- "Position Player WAR Calculation and Details". Baseball Reference.
- "wRAA For Position Player WAR Explained". Baseball Reference.
- "Triple Crown Winner Miguel Cabrera Takes Award". Baseball Writers' Association of America. November 15, 2012.
- "Miguel Cabrera Goes Back-to-Back". Baseball Writers' Association of America. November 15, 2013.
- "Calculating WAR for Position Players". Fangraphs.
- "WAR". Fangraphs.
- "What is WAR?". Fangraphs.
- "MLB MVP Awards 2012: Miguel Cabrera vs. Mike Trout debate to be settled". Sporting News. November 15, 2012.
