= Gross production average =

Baseball statistic

Gross production average (GPA) is a baseball statistic created in 2003 by Aaron Gleeman, as a refinement of on-base plus slugging (OPS). GPA attempts to solve two frequently cited problems with OPS. First, OPS gives equal weight to its two components, on-base percentage (OBP) and slugging percentage (SLG). In fact, OBP contributes significantly more to scoring runs than SLG does. Sabermetricians have calculated that OBP is about 80% more valuable than SLG. A second problem with OPS is that it generates numbers on a scale unfamiliar to most baseball fans. For all the problems with a traditional stat like batting average (AVG), baseball fans immediately know that a player batting .365 is significantly better than average, while a player batting .167 is significantly below average. But many fans do not immediately know how good a player with a 1.013 OPS is.

The basic formula for GPA is: $\frac{{(1.8)OBP} + SLG}{4}$

Unlike OPS, this formula both gives proper relative weight to its two component statistics and generates a number that falls on a scale similar to the familiar batting average scale.

== All-time leaders ==
The all-time top 10 highest career gross production averages, among players with 3,000 or more plate appearances:

1. Babe Ruth .3858
2. Ted Williams .3754
3. Lou Gehrig .3592
4. Barry Bonds .3516
5. Jimmie Foxx .3449
6. Rogers Hornsby .3396
7. Hank Greenberg .3367
8. Manny Ramirez .3312
9. Mickey Mantle .3287
10. Stan Musial .3274

== See also ==
- Weighted on-base average
