= WOBA =

Baseball statistic

In baseball, wOBA (or weighted on-base average) is a statistic, based on linear weights, designed to measure a player's overall offensive contributions per plate appearance. It is calculated by taking the observed run values of various offensive events, dividing by a player's plate appearances, and scaling the result to be on the same scale as on-base percentage. Unlike statistics like OPS, wOBA attempts to assign the proper value for each type of hitting event. It was created by Tom Tango and his coauthors for The Book: Playing the Percentages in Baseball.

== Usage ==
In 2008, sabermetrics website FanGraphs began listing the current and historical wOBA for all players in Major League Baseball. It forms the basis of the offensive component of their wins above replacement (WAR) metric. Sites such as The Hardball Times have studied wOBA and found it to perform comparably to or better than other similar tools (OPS, RC, etc.) used in sabermetrics to estimate runs. The Book uses wOBA in numerous studies to test the validity of many aspects of baseball conventional wisdom.

The benefit of wOBA compared to other offensive value statistics is that it values not just whether the runner reached base but how. Events like home runs, walks, singles, etc. are given their own weight (or coefficient) within the linear formula. The weighting is based on the increase in expected runs for the event type as compared to an out. The coefficients change each season based upon how often each event occurs.

Because the coefficients are derived from expected run value, we can use wOBA to estimate a few more things about a player's production and baseball as a whole. When using the formula (shown below), the numerator side on its own will give us an estimate of how many runs a player is worth to his team. Similarly, a team's wOBA is a good estimator of team runs scored, and deviations from predicted runs scored indicate a combination of situational hitting and base running.

Balls hit hard (i.e. with a high exit velocity) in the sweet spot produce higher wOBA.

== Historical versions of the formula ==
Coefficients for each tracked outcome vary by year. A historical record of these coefficients can be found at FanGraphs.

=== 2023 ===
Per Fangraphs, the formula for wOBA in the 2023 season was:

$wOBA=\frac{(0.697*NIBB) + (0.727*HBP) + (0.855*\mathit{1}B) + (1.248*\mathit{2}B) + (1.575*\mathit{3}B) + (2.014*HR)}{AB + BB - IBB + SF + HBP}$

where:

- NIBB = Non-intentional bases on balls
- HBP = Hit by pitch
- 1B = Single
- 2B = Double
- 3B = Triple
- HR = Home run

—————

- AB = At bat
- BB = Bases on balls
- IBB = Intentional bases on balls
- SF = Sacrifice flies
- HBP = Hit by pitch

=== Original formula ===
The formula below appeared in The Book.

$wOBA=\frac{(0.72*NIBB) + (0.75*HBP) + (0.90*\mathit{1}B) + (0.92*RBOE) + (1.24*\mathit{2}B) + (1.56*\mathit{3}B) + (1.95*HR)}{PA}$

where:

- NIBB = Non-intentional bases on balls
- HBP = Hit by pitch
- 1B = Single
- RBOE = Reached base on error
- 2B = Double
- 3B = Triple
- HR = Home run
- PA = Plate appearance

== Calculating wOBA ==
The Book's original formulation of wOBA used NIBB, HBP, RBOE, 1B, 2B, 3B, and HR. FanGraphs does not include RBOE. The linear weights are derived by calculating the run value of each of these events, plus the run value of an out. One can build a run-expectancy matrix using the 8 base states and 3 out states, combining for 24 base/out stats. The run expectancy of a base-out state is the average number of runs a team can expect to score in the rest of an inning. This is calculated by taking every instance of the event and averaging the runs scored in the rest of the inning. Below is the run expectancy matrix for 2021 provided by FanGraphs:

Run Expectancy Matrix, 2021
Runners On	0 Outs	1 Out	2 Outs
Bases empty	0.51	0.27	0.10
Runner on 1st	0.92	0.54	0.23
Runner on 2nd	1.15	0.71	0.33
Runner on 3rd	1.38	0.96	0.38
Runners on 1st & 2nd	1.56	0.93	0.46
Runners on 1st & 3rd	1.75	1.14	0.49
Runners on 2nd & 3rd	2.13	1.41	0.59
Bases loaded	2.47	1.72	0.84

The run value of a given play is computed as the change in run expectancy from before to after the event, plus any runs that were scored:

$RV(\text{play, base/out state}) = RE(\text{state after play}) - RE(\text{state before play}) + \text{runs scored on play}$

For example, the run value of a HR with the bases empty and no outs is calculated as

$RV(\text{HR with bases empty, 0 outs}) = (.51) - .51 + 1 = 1$

since a run has been scored and the base/out state before and after are the same (bases empty).

For a HR with a runner on 1st and no outs, the calculation is:

$RV(\text{HR with runner on first, 0 outs}) = (.51) - (.92) + 2 = 1.59$

The run value of an event for the season is computed by averaging over all occurrences of that event across all base/out states during the season:

$RV(event) = \frac{\sum_{\text{base} \backslash \text{out state}}\text{(Total times event in base/out state)}RV(\text{event, base} \backslash \text{out state})}{\text{Total times event occurred}}$

The total run-value of each event is the weighted average of the run-value for the play in each base out state. This process is repeated for each of the listed events, NIBB, HBP, RBOE, 1B, 2B, 3B, and HR, plus the value of an out. To align with similar rate-based statistics like OBP, these weights are then recalculated relative to the run value of an out. The result is a league-wide average run value for each type of event. These values represent the linear weights of the events. To place wOBA on a familiar scale, the coefficients (the weights) are then normalized by a common factor so that league-average wOBA equals league-average on-base percentage. This makes wOBA more interpretable, since values such as .320 or .360 can be read in the same way as OBP, making a relatively complicated statistic seem familiar.

== xwOBA (Expected Weighted On-Base Average) ==
Expected Weighted On-base Average (xwOBA) is a Statcast metric that estimates a player's wOBA based on their quality of contact. For each batted-ball, Statcast uses a machine learning model to assign different outcomes a probability based on its similarity in launch angle and exit velocity to other batted-balls. Statcast classifies batted-balls based on launch angle and exit velocity, and on some batted balls a player's sprint speed is factored into the calculation. For example, players with faster sprint speeds are more likely to reach base on a groundball. Like FIP, xwOBA attempts to remove the noise added by defense, focusing only on evaluating what batters can control.

== Ranges for elite, very good, etc. ==
The following table serves as an aggregate summary of various wOBA scales available online.

wOBA Scale
Classification	Range
Elite	.400 and above
Very good	.371 to .399
Good	.321 to .370
Average	.320
Bad	.291 to .320
Very bad	.290 and below
