= Jaffe Wins Above Replacement Score =

Sabermetric baseball statistic

The Jaffe Wins Above Replacement Score, commonly abbreviated JAWS, is a sabermetric baseball statistic developed to evaluate the strength of a player's career and merit for induction into the Baseball Hall of Fame. Created by averaging a player's career WAR with their 7-year peak WAR, its "stated goal is to improve the Hall of Fame's standards, or at least to maintain them rather than erode them, by admitting players who are at least as good as the average Hall of Famer at the position, using a means via which longevity isn't the sole determinant of worthiness."

JAWS was devised in 2004 by Jay Jaffe of Baseball Prospectus and the acronym "JAWS" was introduced by Jaffe the following year. Early in its history, the influence of JAWS was somewhat limited by the paywall of Baseball Prospectus.

In November 2012, Baseball-Reference.com added JAWS values to every player page after Jaffe left Baseball-Reference competitor Baseball Prospectus for Sports Illustrated. In 2014, Will Leitch called JAWS "the definitive statistical measure" in evaluating Hall of Fame cases. In 2016, Craig Edwards of Fangraphs described JAWS as "the standard-bearer for Hall of Fame analysis over the last decade."

Critics of the stat point out that it does not account for postseason performance or awards in measuring players' Hall of Fame worthiness. Further, the metric has been accused of undervaluing individual outstanding seasons.

As of 2014, the player with the highest JAWS score all-time was Babe Ruth and the player with the worst JAWS score in the Baseball Hall of Fame was Tommy McCarthy. As of 2023, Barry Bonds has the best JAWS score of any eligible position player not in the Hall of Fame.
