= Fielding percentage =

Baseball statistic

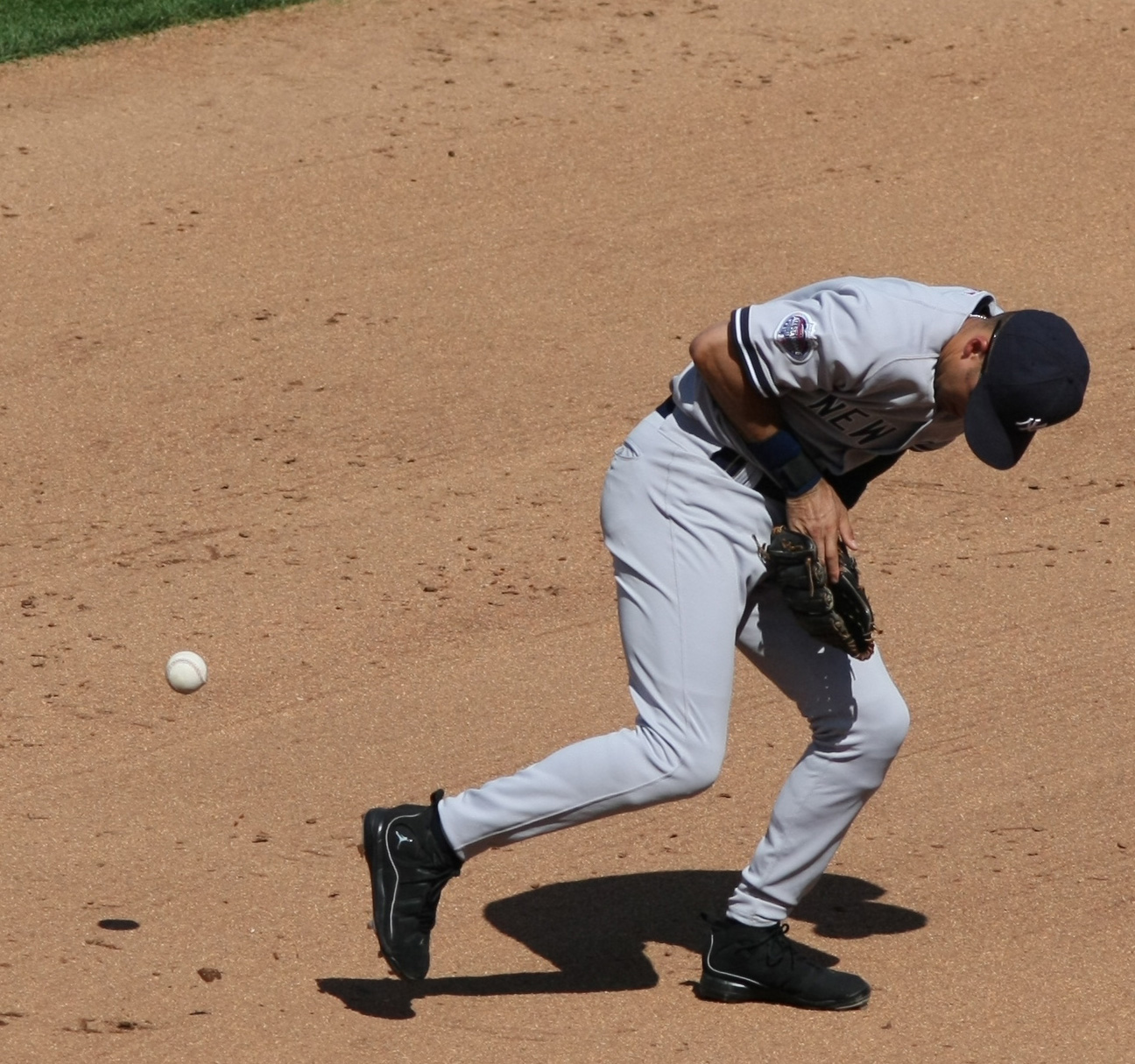
An example of an MLB player making an error.

In baseball statistics, fielding percentage, also known as fielding average, is a measure that reflects the percentage of times a defensive player properly handles a batted or thrown ball. It is calculated by the sum of putouts and assists, divided by the number of total chances (putouts + assists + errors).

While a high fielding percentage is regarded as a sign of defensive skill, it is also possible for a player of lesser defensive skill to have a high fielding percentage, as it does not reflect or take into account a player's defensive range; a player who cannot get to a ball surrenders a hit instead of having an opportunity to make an out or an error. Conversely, a highly skilled fielder might have a comparatively low fielding percentage by virtue of reaching, and potentially missing, a greater number of balls.

In order to qualify for the league lead in fielding percentage, an infielder or outfielder must appear at the specific position in at least two-thirds of his team's games (games in the outfield are not separated by position). A catcher must appear in at least half his team's games. A pitcher must pitch at least one inning for each of his team's scheduled games (however, a pitcher with fewer innings may qualify if they have more total chances and a higher average). In order to qualify for major league career records for fielding average, a player must appear in 1,000 games at the position; pitchers must have at least 1,500 innings.

The MLB record for team fielding percentage is currently held by the 2013 Baltimore Orioles, with a .99104 fielding percentage.

== See also ==
- Baseball fielding positions
- Defensive runs saved
- Ultimate zone rating
