= Aaron Gleeman =

American sportswriter (born 1983)

Aaron Gleeman (born 1982 or 1983) is an American sports writer primarily covering the Minnesota Twins. He previously wrote for The Athletic and is the former editor-in-chief at Baseball Prospectus. He co-hosts Gleeman and the Geek, a sports podcast about the Twins. He was a co-founder and writer for The Hardball Times beginning in 2004 before leaving to write for NBC Sports. In 2006, Gleeman was featured in a short profile in Sports Illustrated. He is the author of “The Big 50: Minnesota Twins: The Men and Moments that Made the Minnesota Twins”, published in 2018. He won the 2021 National Sports Media Association Minnesota Sportswriter of the Year Award. He left The Athletic in 2026, continuing to write about the Twins from his own website.

Gleeman is a graduate of Highland Park High School in St. Paul, Minnesota. He then attended the University of Minnesota as a journalism major. However, the Minnesota Daily did not hire him as a staff writer. Gleeman eventually dropped out of college without obtaining a degree.

== Contributions to sabermetrics ==
On November 25, 2003, Gleeman used his blog to introduce a new statistic called Gleeman Production Average. The name was later changed to Gross Production Average to make it more palatable. The formula is:

$$GPA = {(1.8\times OBP)+SLG\over 4}$$

where OBP is on-base percentage and SLG is slugging percentage. The result is a number that resembles a batting average but reflects the player's ability to avoid outs and hit for power.
