= Tom Tango =

Canadian baseball writer and statistician

- Born: Unknown; 1968 (age 57–58); Canada
- Other name: "TangoTiger"
- Occupations: Sabermetrics analyst, statistician
- Known for: Maintaining the "Marcel the Monkey Forecasting System", creating FIP
- Notable work: "The Book: Playing the Percentages in Baseball", 2006

Tom Tango and "TangoTiger" are aliases used online by a baseball sabermetrics and ice hockey statistics analyst. He runs the Tango on Baseball sabermetrics website and is also a contributor to ESPN's baseball blog TMI (The Max Info). Tango is currently the Senior Database Architect of Stats for MLB Advanced Media.

Born in Canada in 1968, he resides in New Jersey with his family and has insisted on keeping his true name secret.

In 2006, Tango's book The Book: Playing the Percentages in Baseball, which was co-written with Mitchel Lichtman and Andrew Dolphin, was published featuring a foreword by Pete Palmer. In The Book he and his coauthors analyzed many advanced baseball questions, such as how to optimize a lineup or when to issue an intentional base on balls. They also introduced the wOBA metric to measure overall offensive contributions.

Tango maintains the "Marcel the Monkey Forecasting System," a player projection system which uses three years of weighted player statistics with statistical regression and player age adjustment.

He is best known for developing the FIP (Fielding Independent Pitching) statistic, which attempts to more accurately assess the quality of a pitcher's performance than other statistics, such as ERA. 2009 American League Cy Young Award winner Zack Greinke specifically mentioned FIP as his favorite statistic. "That's pretty much how I pitch, to try to keep my FIP as low as possible".

Tango works as a consultant for several National Hockey League teams, and has worked for Major League Baseball. Tango has worked for the Seattle Mariners and Toronto Blue Jays as a statistical analysis consultant. He worked exclusively for the Chicago Cubs in a similar role.

In 2020, he was awarded the Henry Chadwick Award by the Society for American Baseball Research. The award is given "to honor those researchers, historians, analysts, and statisticians whose work has most contributed to our understanding of the game and its history."

== Books ==
- Tom Tango, Mitchel Lichtman, and Andrew Dolphin. The Book: Playing the Percentages in Baseball. Washington, D.C.: Potomac Books, 2007. ISBN 1-59797-129-4.
