= Dave Cameron (baseball analyst) =

American baseball analyst (born 1980)

- Born: 1980 (age 45–46)
- Occupation: Sportswriter
- Years active: 1999—present
- Employer: Seattle Mariners

Dave Cameron is an American baseball analyst for the Seattle Mariners. He was formerly the managing editor and a senior writer for FanGraphs, an analyst for the San Diego Padres, and owner-operator of USS Mariner.

== Biography ==
Cameron grew up in Seattle, attending Christian Faith High School in Des Moines, Washington from 1995 to 1999. In high school he developed a strong interest in baseball, discovering the alt.sports.baseball.sea-mariners newsgroup, reading Rob Neyer and playing the sport. Cameron, a varsity catcher, made the state's all-star team his senior year when he led the league in walks. After high school he attended the University of North Carolina at Greensboro where he received his degree in economics.

In 1999 he began writing for Baseball Prospectus then, three years later, in 2002 he created U.S.S. Mariner with Derek Zumsteg and Jason Barker. The website was named after the U.S.S. Mariner, a ship in the US Navy that would "fire its cannon after Mariner home runs and wins back in the 1980s". In 2008, he also acted for a while as ESPN commentator. In March 2009, Cameron began writing for The Wall Street Journal then, in April of the following year, Cameron became the full-time managing editor and operator of FanGraphs.

On July 25, 2011, Cameron announced that he has been diagnosed with acute myeloid leukemia. Treatment was successful. In December 2011, he announced that he was joining the Baseball Writers' Association of America: "When I started writing about baseball... I never imagined it would turn into a career or that I'd ever be considered an Official Baseball Writer. The world is full of interesting twists and turns, though, and I'm happy to be able to walk through this newest open door."

=== Grandfather's murder ===
Cameron's maternal grandfather was murdered when his mother was 19, at the family home in Baltimore. There is currently a documentary being made about the killing and how it shaped the lives of Cameron's 13 aunts and uncles.

=== "An Open Letter" ===
On June 27, 2007 Cameron wrote a post "An Open Letter To Rafael Chaves," asking Mariners pitching coach Rafael Chaves to tell pitcher Felix Hernandez to throw fewer fastballs: "Take over control of the pitch selection to start the game. Make Felix throw a change-up or a curve ball to the first batter. Throw a first pitch slider in the first inning." This letter eventually was passed along by a fan to Chaves, who had previously been attempting to make the same point to Hernandez and used the letter as reinforcement. Hernandez changed his pitching approach the next game saying: "On the internet, they say when I throw a lot of fastballs in the first inning, they score a lot of runs. I tried to mix all my pitches in the first inning."

=== San Diego Padres ===
On January 10, 2018 it was reported Cameron would join the San Diego Padres. His role would be senior analyst in the organization's research and development department. Cameron left the Padres organization following the 2021 season.

=== Seattle Mariners ===
After leaving the Padres, Cameron took a consulting job with the Mariners. After the 2022 season, he was promoted to senior director of player procurement.

== Baseball writing ==
Cameron was the managing editor of FanGraphs. Along with Derek Zumsteg, Cameron created the Seattle Mariners blog U.S.S. Mariner. He also previously wrote for ESPN, The Wall Street Journal, and Baseball Prospectus.

Among other topics he has contributed sabermetric research on home run/fly ball rate, correlations between velocity and strikeout rates, the general evaluation of pitcher talent, defensive evaluation, and roster construction strategies.
