= The Hardball Times =

Baseball news and analysis site

The Hardball Times (abbreviated as THT) is a website which publishes news, original comments and statistical analysis of baseball each week Monday through Friday, in addition to the Hardball Times Annual book which features essays by leading sabermetric personalities. The website features the slogan "Baseball. Insight. Daily."

Run by current owners Dave Studeman and David Gassko, it was founded by Aaron Gleeman and Bill James' assistant Matthew Namee in 2004. Fangraphs acquired the site in 2012. The Hardball Times went on temporary hiatus in early 2020 due to decreasing traffic caused by the delay of the season because of the COVID-19 pandemic.

== Staff ==
The Hardball Times maintains a large and changing stable of writers. Many of its writers have gone on to work for larger media organizations (former writers Aaron Gleeman and Craig Calcaterra both work for NBC) or major league baseball teams (including Carlos Gomez, who is a scout for the Arizona Diamondbacks; Dan Fox, who is the Director of Baseball Systems Development for the Pittsburgh Pirates; Adam Guttridge, who is a Baseball Operations Analyst for the Milwaukee Brewers; and Josh Kalk, who is a Baseball Operations Analyst with the Tampa Bay Rays). Its staff as of 2010 included Richard Barbieri, John Barten, Brian Borawski, Kevin Dame, Joshua Fisher, Brandon Isleib, Chris Jaffe, Brad Johnson, Max Marchi, Bruce Markusen, Dan Novick, Harry Pavlidis, Alex Pedicini, Jeff Sackmann, Mike Silver, Nick Steiner, Steve Treder, Geoff Young, Ricky Zanker, and a cartoonist who goes by “Tuck!” One of THT's best-known and most controversial writers, John Brattain, died on March 24, 2009.

The site is edited by Joe Distelheim, Travis Conrads, Jeremiah Oshan and Bryan Tsao. THT also features a blog, THT Live, which is run by Novick.

== THT Fantasy ==
The Hardball Times includes a dedicated fantasy section, running multiple articles a day five days a week. Its writers include Derek Carty, who has been there from the start, as well as Derek Ambrosino, Jeffrey Gross, Matt Hagen, Jonathan Halket, Jeremiah Oshan, Josh Shepardson, and Jonathan Sher. THT Fantasy is edited by Travis Conrads, Ben Jacobs, and Jeremiah Oshan.

THT Fantasy runs a weekly "Roster Doctor" column in which writers dissect a reader's roster and features a daily updated "Closer Watch" feature, which allows readers to keep up tabs on the closer situation for all 30 Major League teams. THT Fantasy also features weekly waiver wire articles that dissect undervalued fantasy players in the AL and NL.

== THT Forecasts ==
Launched in March 2010, THT Forecasts begins its third season as a subscription-only section featuring Brian Cartwright's Oliver Projections. Subscribers can access six years worth of projections, including minor league players, which are updated weekly during the season.

== Books ==
Since its inception in 2004, The Hardball Times has released an annual book, The Hardball Times Baseball Annual.

From 2007–2009, The Hardball Times also released a pre-season book, The Hardball Times Season Preview. The book consisted of 30 team essays, over 1,000 player comments, and projections for each player. It also featured projected standings, career projections, and multiple essays in the back of the book, mostly concerning fantasy baseball. In the 2010, the book was replaced by THT Forecasts.

In 2004, Steve Treder and Dave Studeman also released The Hardball Times Bullpen Book, which chronicled the history of major league relievers and reviewed, in detail, the best and worst performers of each major league bullpen from 2002 through 2004.
