= Baseball Reference =

Baseball statistics database

- Website type: Baseball statistics
- Owner: Sports Reference
- Creator: Sean Forman
- Website: www.baseball-reference.com
- Launched: April 2000; 26 years ago
- Current status: Active

Baseball Reference is a baseball statistics database maintained by Sports Reference. The site provides career statistics for Major League Baseball (MLB) players and teams as well as records, MLB draft history, and sabermetrics.

== History ==
Founder Sean Forman began developing the website while working on his Ph.D. dissertation in applied math and computational science at the University of Iowa. While writing his dissertation, he had also been writing articles on and blogging about sabermetrics. Forman's database was originally built from the Total Baseball series of baseball encyclopedias.

The website went online in April 2000, after first being launched in February 2000 as part of the website for the Big Bad Baseball Annual. It was originally built as a web interface to the Lahman Baseball Database, though it now employs a variety of data sources.

In 2004, Forman founded Sports Reference. Sports Reference is a website that came out of the Baseball Reference website. The company was incorporated as Sports Reference, LLC in 2007. In 2006, Forman left his job as a math professor at Saint Joseph's University to focus on Baseball Reference full-time.

In February 2009, Fantasy Sports Ventures took a minority stake in Sports Reference, for a "low seven-figure sum".

In late April 2021, the site changed a number of identifying names, "discontinuing the use of nicknames that are racially or ethnically influenced" and "names based upon a player's disability", such as Chief Bender and Dummy Hoy, who are now listed as Charles Bender and Billy Hoy, respectively.

== Features ==
=== Statistics ===
The site has season, career, and minor league records (when available, back to 1888) for everyone who has played Major League Baseball, year-by-year team pages, all final league standings, all postseason numbers, voting results for all historic awards such as the Cy Young Award and MVP, head-to-head batter vs. pitcher career totals, individual statistical leaders for each season and all-time, managers' career records, the full results of all MLB player drafts, Negro leagues statistics (Baseball Reference added Negro League statistics to its website in 2021), a baseball encyclopedia (the Bullpen), and box scores and game logs from every MLB game back to 1901, among other features.

To compare ballplayers to one-another it offers "Black Ink" and "Gray Ink" tests, which tally a player's dominance and overall productivity against his peers. In 2012, it began to offer Jay Jaffe's Jaffe Wins Above Replacement Score (JAWS) statistic for comparing players of different eras against each other by weighing their performance in the prime as well as their entire career.

Baseball Reference began including its version of Wins Above Replacement (WAR) in 2010. Its version determining a player's value differs slightly from other baseball statistics websites, including FanGraphs and Baseball Prospectus.

=== Bullpen ===
Baseball Reference has its own baseball encyclopedia, a wiki called "Baseball Reference Bullpen", which can be edited by anyone and is modeled after Wikipedia. As of September 2026, the Bullpen contains more than 128,000 articles.

=== Easter eggs and other humor ===
There are a number of what the website calls "Frivolities." Examples include:

- The Oracle of Baseball, which is no longer active on the website, linked any two players by common teammates in the way the pop culture website "Oracle of Bacon" does.
- A page devoted to Keith Hernandez's mustache, which is the only "fictional" page on Baseball Reference.
- The site made "Tungsten Arm O'Doyle", an internet meme associated with Shohei Ohtani, a redirect to Ohtani's page.
- Although the standard player page notes a given player's favored batting and throwing arms, Paul O'Neill's page adds his kicking leg and a link to a video of the 1989 game when he kicked the ball from the outfield to first base. Likewise, the page for Jim Abbott (who was born without a right hand) adds "Fields: Left as well" in addition to him batting and throwing left handed.
- The 2021 Seattle Mariners page lists the team's "fun differential" of +90, based on a comment from manager Scott Servais on the team's negative run differential.
- Oddibe McDowell's page features his monthly water bill payments from February 2011 to March 2012, which were public record for Broward County, Florida and subsequently were featured in a recurring fashion on Deadspin.
- Tommy John's 1975 season is listed as "Did not play - Eponymous Surgical Procedure", in a reference to him being the first player to receive Tommy John surgery.

== See also ==
- Sports Reference
- Pro Football Reference
