= Ultimate zone rating =

Baseball statistic

Ultimate zone rating (UZR) is a sabermetric statistic used to measure fielding. It compares the event that actually happened (hit/out/error) to data on similarly hit balls in the past to determine how much better or worse the fielder did than the "average" player. UZR divides a baseball field into multiple zones and assigns individual fielders responsibility for those zones.

UZR calculations are provided at FanGraphs by Mitchel Lichtman.

Proponents of the statistic advise that defense is best judged over three-year spans, as a given year contains a relatively small sample and can result in large statistical swings. Former Major League Baseball shortstop David Eckstein said "a lot of defense is putting yourself in the right position to make plays." Josh Stein, San Diego Padres director of baseball operations, said UZR "can be skewed if the player is not starting from the exact middle of [UZR's zone] chart."
