= FanGraphs =

Baseball statistics website

- Website type: Baseball statistics and analysis
- Creator: David Appelman
- Editor: Meg Rowley
- Website: fangraphs.com
- Current status: Active

FanGraphs.com is an American website run by Fangraphs Inc., located in Arlington, Virginia, and created and owned by David Appelman that provides statistics for every player in Major League Baseball history.

On September 18, 2009, Fangraphs Inc. launched an iPhone app in partnership with Hawk Ridge Consulting, which was discontinued before returning in 2022. Fangraphs has a number of content partners including ESPN, SB Nation and Fanhouse.

== FanGraphs products ==
FanGraphs creates several products:

=== Web sites ===
- The FanGraphs homepage, which contains articles, statistical reports and also covers baseball history as well as current issues and events, including games and series, injuries, forecasts, player profiles, baseball finance, and the player marketplace.
- RotoGraphs is FanGraphs' fantasy baseball advice and analysis section. It originally featured David Golebiewski of ESPN Inside Edge, Marc Hulet, Brian Joura of newyorkmetsdaily.com, and Peter Bendix. Currently managed by Eno Sarris.
- NotGraphs provides "a place to put things that would otherwise not have a place on FanGraphs". NotGraphs was managed by Carson Cistulli but ceased publishing new content at the conclusion of the 2014 season.
- The Community Blog is an opportunity for readers to share their writing through FanGraphs. In May 2010 an editorial staff was put in place to guarantee an "approval process" within 48 hours of submission.
- The FanGraphs Library, later the Sabermetrics Library, is an encyclopedia of Sabermetric statistics and principles run by Neil Weinberg.

=== Publishing ===
FanGraphs releases an annual book, The FanGraphs Second Opinion: Fantasy Companion, that contains statistics and analysis of the past season, in-depth player profiles, team previews, articles on fantasy strategy and forecasts of the upcoming season.

=== Podcasts ===
- Effectively Wild, hosted by Ben Lindbergh and Meg Rowley, is a thrice weekly podcast. Effectively Wild was initially created as a part of Baseball Prospectus, but moved over to FanGraphs at the beginning of 2017.
- The Sleeper and the Bust, hosted by Paul Sporer, Justin Mason, and Joe Orrico is a fantasy baseball focused podcast that releases episodes regularly. Jason Collette is a frequent co-host.
- FanGraphs Audio was a weekly program, which ended after its March 2023 episode.

=== Fantasy baseball ===
FanGraphs works with Ottoneu baseball to offer a fantasy baseball program with prizes.

== Regular writers and Staff ==
=== FanGraphs ===
- Meg Rowley – Managing Editor of FanGraphs. Rowley joined FanGraphs as a writer and Managing Editor for The Hardball Times in January 2018. She moved to her current role as FanGraphs Managing Editor in November 2018. Prior to her time at FanGraphs, Rowley wrote for Baseball Prospectus and the now-defunct FOX Sports site Just A Bit Outside.
- Paul Swydan – Senior writer of FanGraphs. Joined in January, 2011. Swydan is the co-managing editor of The Hardball Times and is a writer for ESPN Insider. He previously worked 7 years for the Colorado Rockies and wrote for Baseball Prospectus, MLB.com, Rockies Magazine and the Biz Of Baseball.
- Eric Longenhagen – FanGraphs lead prospect analyst. Contributed in 2014 and 2015, but re-joined in May, 2016. Longenhagen previously wrote for Crashburn Alley, Sports on Earth, Prospect Insider and ESPN.
- Chris Mitchell – Prospect analyst at FanGraphs and proprietor of the KATOH prospect projection system. Joined February, 2015. Mitchell also contributes to The Hardball Times, and has previously contributed to Pinstripe Alley and Pinstripe Pundits.
- Kiley McDaniel – Prospect analyst at Fangraphs. McDaniel previously worked as the assistant director of Baseball Operations with the Atlanta Braves, and for the New York Yankees, Pittsburgh Pirates and Baltimore Orioles and wrote for Scout.com and ESPN's Draft Blog.
- Craig Edwards – Staff writer of FanGraphs. Joined in February 2015.
- Nathaniel Grow – Legal analyst at FanGraphs. Joined in December, 2014. Grow is an associate professor of Legal Studies at the University of Georgia's Terry College of Business. He is the author of Baseball on Trial: The Origin of Baseball's Antitrust Exemption, as well as a number of sports-related law review articles.
- Corinne Landrey – Staff writer of FanGraphs. Joined in June, 2016. Landrey also writes for The Hardball Times, Today's Knuckleball and is the managing editor of Crashburn Alley.
- David Laurila – Staff writer of FanGraphs. Joined in May, 2011. Laurila contributes Q&A articles and produces the Sunday Notes column. He previously wrote for Baseball Prospectus where he wrote the Prospectus Q&A from February 2006 until May 2011.
- Blake Murphy – Staff writer of FanGraphs and RotoGraphs. Joined in July 2013. Murphy contributes to the Daily Fantasy feature at RotoGraphs. He also serves as the NBA editor for theScore and writes for NylonCalculus.com and RaptorsRepublic.com.
- Ben Clemens - Staff writer of FanGraphs. Joined in March 2019. Clemens is responsible for daily weekday articles discussing recent events and unique statistics involved. He also creates the yearly trade value and free agent values and predictions series. Before joining FanGraphs Clemens previously worked in the finance industry.
- Joey Brown - Fantasy Baseball and Automation Developer of FanGraphs. Joined FanGraphs in May 2026. Brown is responsible for building and maintaining internal data ingestion automation tools. He optimizes data pipelines for the site’s proprietary player projections and manages backend database functionality for high-traffic fantasy tools. He previously worked as a backend software engineer at Amazon and Carahsoft Technology Corp.
- David G. Temple – Staff writer of FanGraphs and NotGraphs. Joined FanGraphs in October, 2013. Temple began writing for NotGraphs in July, 2012. He also contributes to The Hardball Times and is the host of the Stealing Home podcast. He previously contributed to TheClassical.com and ThePlatoonAdvantage.com.
- Neil Weinberg – Site educator of FanGraphs. Joined in July 2014. Weinberg hosts a weekly chat and is responsible for maintaining the FanGraphs statistical library. He also works as a managing editor for SB Nation's BeyondtheBoxscore and writes for The Hardball Times, Gammons Daily, TigsTown.com and NewEnglishD.com.
- Jeff Zimmerman – Staff writer of FanGraphs and RotoGraphs. Joined in March 2010. Zimmerman is the expert on player health and contributes extensive work relating to player aging curves. He contributes the weekly MASH report feature to RotoGraphs. He is also the founder of BaseballHeatMaps.com and writes for SB Nation's RoyalsReview.

=== RotoGraphs ===
- Mike Axisa (Apr '10 - present) – RotoGraphs staff writer. Also writes for and co-founded River Ave. Blues, a Yankees blog.
- Michael Barr (Feb '11 - present) – RotoGraphs and FanGraphs staff writer.
- Howard Bender (Feb '11 - present) – Founder of The Fantasy Baseball Buzz, also a contributor to the 2011 Fantasy Baseball Guide magazine and ESPN Radio.
- Jason Catania (Mar '11 - present) – Also writes for ESPN The Magazine and ESPN Insider.
- Ben Duronio (Jan '12 - present) – Also writes for the Capitol Avenue Club, a Braves blog. Worked with ESPN Stats & Info Group.
- Erik Hahmann (Feb '11 - present) – Previously wrote for Bloomberg Sports, also writes for DraysBay.
- Marc Hulet (Apr '08 - present) – Hulet provides articles and scouting reports on minor league prospects, including annual preseason and midseason top prospect lists.
- Brad Johnson (Oct '13 - present)– Johnson is responsible for The Daily Grind feature at RotoGraphs. Also occasionally contributes to The Hardball Times.
- Mike Podhorzer (Mar '11 - present) – Has written for The Fantasy Baseball Generals and FantasyPros911.
- Zach Sanders (Nov '09 - present) – RotoGraphs staff writer and creator of the Roto Riteup, a daily fantasy baseball column which runs through the duration of the MLB season. Sanders also contributes to RotoGraphs' Fantasy Rankings.
- Dan Wade (Aug '11 - present) – RotoGraphs staff writer.
- David Wiers (Mar '12 - present) - RotoGraphs staff writer and co-author of the Roto Riteup series.

=== Former ===
- RJ Anderson – Now writes for Baseball Prospectus.
- Patrick Andriola - Wrote for FanGraphs from June 2010 until October 2010 Before joining FanGraphs Andriola wrote for The Hardball Times (2009, 2010) and, as a student, worked for the Major League Baseball's Labor Relations Department.
- Peter Bendix – Currently the president of baseball operations for the Miami Marlins. Wrote articles for RotoGraphs in the 2008–2009 offseason.
- Dave Cameron – Former managing editor and senior writer of FanGraphs. He hosted a weekly chat, contributed to FanGraphs on Fox Sports, wrote several features such as the annual "Trade Value" series and was a regular contributor to the FanGraphs Audio podcast. Cameron was the co-founder of USSMariner.com and previously worked for Baseball Prospectus and contributed to The Wall Street Journal. On January 10, 2018, Cameron announced that he would be leaving FanGraphs to become an analyst for the San Diego Padres. He joined the Seattle Mariners in 2022.
- Carson Cistulli – Senior writer of FanGraphs, former editor of NotGraphs and host of the FanGraphs Audio podcast. Joined in August, 2009. Cistulli is responsible for the Daily Notes and writes the "Fringe Five" prospect feature. He previously worked for The Hardball Times. He left FanGraphs in November 2018 to work for the Toronto Blue Jays.
- Craig Edwards – Edwards practiced law in Chicago for a number of years before coming to baseball, now working as Senior Analyst of Economics and Collective Bargaining for the Major League Baseball Players Association. He previously wrote for FanGraphs from 2015 to 2021, joining the site full-time in 2018 when he stepped down as Managing Editor of Viva El Birdos, a St. Louis Cardinals blog.
- Drew Fairservice – Fairservice is the managing editor of GhostRunnerOnFirst.com and previously wrote for the theScore Inc.
- August Fagerstrom – Former staff writer of FanGraphs. Joined in June 2014. Fagerstrom also wrote for the Akron Beacon Journal and Ohio.com and has been published in the Chicago Tribune and The Washington Post. He left FanGraphs at the end of the 2016 season to work for the Milwaukee Brewers.
- Sky Kalkman – Left FanGraphs in 2006, then wrote for Beyond The Boxscore, and now writes for Baseball Prospectus.
- Jonah Keri – Keri joined FanGraphs in January 2011, introduced as having "written for every publication known to man," including Playboy, ESPN, and Baseball Prospectus. Keri was a staff writer for FanGraphs and NotGraphs until August 2011 when he left to write at Grantland.
- Matt Klaassen – Joined in November 2009 until November 2014. Klaassen was a staff writer and occasionally contributed to the FanGraphs Audio podcast.
- Erik Manning – Now writes for Beyond The Boxscore.
- Mike Petriello – Petriello now works for MLB.com. He's also contributed to The Hardball Times, ESPN Insider and DodgersDigest.com. He was previously an editor producer for Sports on Earth.
- Frankie Piliere – Now writes for Scout.com.
- Eno Sarris – Senior writer of FanGraphs and editor of RotoGraphs. Joined in July 2010. Sarris hosted a weekly chat, contributed to FanGraphs on Fox Sports and NotGraphs and is the founder and operator of BeerGraphs. He also wrote for the Hardball Times and previously wrote for Bloomberg Sports and Amazin' Avenue. Now a senior writer at The Athletic.
- Bryan Smith - Wrote for FanGraphs from January 2010 until November 2010.
- Steve Sommer - Wrote for FanGraphs from March 2010 until May 2010. Later wrote for The Hardball Times.
- Nathaniel Stoltz – Stoltz was a prospect writer who viewed prospects in the Eastern, Carolina, South Atlantic, and New York-Penn Leagues. He previously wrote at Beyond the Box Score, Athletics Nation, and RotoGraphs.
- Jeff Sullivan – On February 22, 2019, Sullivan announced he was leaving FanGraphs for a job with the Tampa Bay Rays. He was a senior writer of FanGraphs and editor of the Community blog. Sullivan hosted a weekly chat, contributed to FanGraphs on Fox Sports, wrote several features, such as the "Worst of the Best" series and is a co-hosted of the "Effectively Wild" podcast. He also wrote for USSMariner.com and previously wrote for SB Nation's Lookout Landing.
- JD Sussman – Sussman was a prospect writer who contributed to the Prospect Watch feature. He previously wrote for BullpenBanter.com.
- Wendy Thurm – Thurm was a previous lawyer of 18 years who covered legal issues in baseball. She has previously contributed to Sports on Earth, ESPN, SB Nation, theScore, BayAreaSportsGuy.com, The Classical, and San Francisco magazine.
- Brandon Warne - From Feb 2012 to March 2018. Covered two start starting pitchers for Rotographs. Warne is a Minnesota Twins beat reporter for Twin Cities-based website Access Twins.
- Bradley Woodrum – Woodrum holds degrees from Jacksonville University (B.A. Economics and B.A. English) and Roosevelt University (M.A. Economics). He also co-founded Cubs Stats and writes for DRaysBay and SBN Tampa Bay. He worked for the Miami Marlins from 2018 to 2024.
