= Crimestoppers =

Crimestoppers may refer to:

- Crime Stoppers, community program that assists people in providing anonymous information about criminal activity
  - Crime Stoppers USA, the program in the United States
  - Crimestoppers UK, the program in the United Kingdom
  - Crime Stoppers International, a program to spread Crime Stoppers worldwide
