= Binge Mode =

Pop culture podcast

- Show logo for Season 5: Binge Mode: Star Wars
- Genre: Pop culture

Cast and voices
- Hosted by: Mallory Rubin; Jason Concepcion

Music
- Composed by: Isaac Lee (Seasons 3, 5, and 7)

Production
- Production: Isaac K. Lee; Zachary Kram; Steve Ahlman (Season 6~); Zachary Mack (Season 1)

Publication
- No. of seasons: 7
- No. of episodes: 255
- Original release: May 31, 2017 – March 24, 2021
- Provider: The Ringer

Related
- Website: https://www.theringer.com/binge-mode

Binge Mode is a pop culture podcast produced by The Ringer. It is hosted by the website's editor-in-chief, Mallory Rubin, and former senior creative, Jason Concepcion. The first episode premiered on June 5, 2017. Binge Mode has been named to "best podcast" lists by Time, USA Today, and Adweek.

== History ==
Concepcion and Rubin met when they were employees at the now-shuttered website Grantland. Their mutual enthusiasm for Game of Thrones made them the unofficial experts of the show in the eyes of the other staffers. After opening The Ringer, CEO Bill Simmons suggested the two start a Game of Thrones podcast prior to the premiere of the series' seventh season.

The podcast premiered on June 5, 2017. The hosts recapped every episode of the Game of Thrones series in the lead up to the release of the seventh season, and then recapped that season after it premiered. Concepcion and Rubin frequently referenced Harry Potter in season one of the podcast, which influenced their decision to focus on the book series for season three, Binge Mode: Harry Potter. The show returned to Game of Thrones leading up to and throughout the series' eighth and final season. On August 23, 2019, The Ringer announced a fifth season centering on the Star Wars franchise.

== Format ==
Rubin and Concepcion give a detailed recap of the episode or chapter they are examining and then identify the central themes and key ideas. The podcast episodes are serialized either in the order that the original work was released (in the cases of Game of Thrones and Harry Potter) or in the order of the in-universe chronology (in the case of Star Wars), and contain spoilers. The hosts use humor and in-depth analysis during their discussion.

The first season, airing in 2017, dedicated an episode to each individual episode of the first seven seasons of Game of Thrones, covering the first six seasons retrospectively and the seventh season concurrently with the show's release. The fourth season, airing in 2019, returned to Game of Thrones to cover the show's eighth and final season concurrent with its release.

The third season of the show focused on the Harry Potter series, with each episode dedicated to recapping a few chapters of each book in the series. Additional episodes in the season also covered other parts of the franchise, such as the film series and the sequel stage play.

The show's fifth season, which aired from October 2019 to February 2020, covered the Star Wars franchise, with individual episodes addressing each film and canonical television show in the series, with additional episodes focused on character studies and other related media. The season was scheduled such that it covered Star Wars: The Rise of Skywalker and the first season of The Mandalorian upon their release.

The show's seventh season, which premiered in October 2020, covers the Marvel Cinematic Universe, with individual episodes addressing each film in the series in release order.

Between these primary seasons, seasons two and six of the podcast, titled Binge Mode: Weekly, covered a range of topics, with each episode focusing on different television shows, films, books, or other pieces of media.

The final episode of Season 7 "I Love You 3000" premiered March 5, 2021 as Concepcion left The Ringer for Crooked Media. After Concepcion's departure, Binge Mode entered hiatus and a new pop culture podcast co-hosted by Rubin titled The Ringer-Verse was started. Concepcion went on to host a podcast of similar format to Binge Mode titled X-Ray Vision at Crooked Media.

== Seasons ==
Season	Title	Subject	Episodes	Originally aired	
Season	Title	Subject	Episodes	First aired	Last aired
1	Binge Mode: Game of Thrones	Game of Thrones, seasons 1–7	67	June 5, 2017	August 31, 2017
2	Binge Mode: Weekly	Numerous subjects, including Coco, Black Mirror, Star Wars, The Shape of Water, Electric Dreams, Friday Night Lights, The Good Place, the Marvel Cinematic Universe, Annihilation, Jessica Jones, Billions, Ready Player One, and Westworld	27	November 30, 2017	June 7, 2018
3	Binge Mode: Harry Potter	Harry Potter book series, film series, and The Cursed Child	69	June 11, 2018	January 29, 2019
4	Binge Mode: Game of Thrones	Game of Thrones, season 8	14	March 15, 2019	July 25, 2019
5	Binge Mode: Star Wars	Star Wars franchise, including the Skywalker Saga and Anthology films, The Clone Wars, Rebels, and The Mandalorian	34	October 21, 2019	February 4, 2020
6	Binge Mode: Weekly	Numerous subjects, including Devs, Saga, and The Clone Wars season 7	10	April 1, 2020	July 18, 2020
7	Binge Mode: Marvel	Marvel Cinematic Universe	30	October 27, 2020	February 23, 2021

== Other media ==
Rubin and Concepcion appeared at SXSW 2019 for a live session of Talk The Thrones, The Ringer's Game of Thrones after-show hosted by Chris Ryan.

== Accolades ==
Binge Mode has been recognized as a "best podcast" by Time, Marie Claire, Vulture, GQ, Adweek, and Oprah Magazine. It was ranked #1 on the Apple Podcasts iTunes chart on April 15, 2019. The podcast beat Crime Junkie for first place in the 2019 Ultimate Podcast Bracket produced by USA Today, with 59% of the vote. It won the same bracket in 2020, beating The Pat McAfee Show.
