= Sean Fennessey =

Journalist, editor, and American media personality

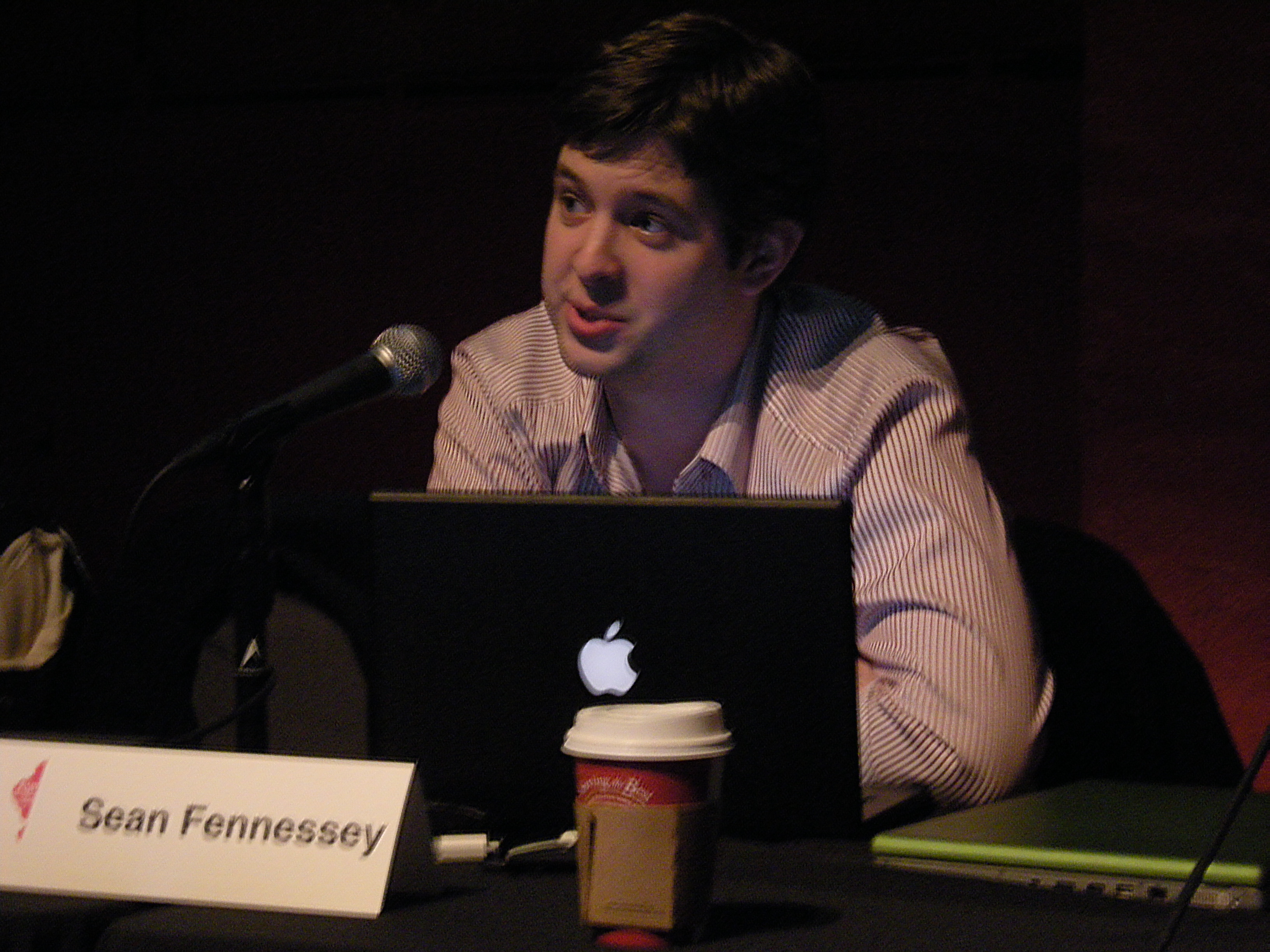
- Fennessey in 2009
- Born: Sean Fennessey; July 26, 1982 (age 44); Long Island, New York, United States
- Education: Ithaca College, BA
- Occupations: Journalist, editor, podcast host
- Children: 1
- Writing career
- Language: English
- Website: seanfennessey.com

Sean Fennessey (born July 26, 1982) is an American journalist, editor, podcast host, and film producer. He is the Head of Content at the sports and pop culture website The Ringer, where he co-hosts The Big Picture film podcast with Amanda Dobbins. As a journalist, Fennessey has written for numerous publications, including Rolling Stone, The Los Angeles Times, The Washington Post, SPIN, and Pitchfork, among others. He was a writer and editor for Vibe and GQ before working as Chief Editor at ESPN's Grantland. In addition to his journalism and podcast careers, Fennessey has produced multiple documentary films.

== Early life and education ==
Fennessey was born and raised on Long Island, New York. His father was a police officer. He attended Ithaca College and graduated in 2003 with a B.A. in journalism.

== Career ==
After moving to New York City in 2003, Fennessey wrote freelance articles for Pitchfork and SPIN before earning his first position on the writer's staff of Complex Magazine in 2004, focusing on rap music and culture. After leaving Complex in 2005 Fennessey continued to write hip-hop related articles for numerous publications. He joined Vibe Magazine in 2007 as Chief Music Editor, a role he held until the magazine's closure in 2009. While at Vibe, Fennessey interviewed numerous musicians, most notably Kanye West, who he had already interviewed multiple times for Complex.

In 2010, Fennessey began writing for GQ Magazine, focusing on fashion in music, film, and sports. He was promoted to Senior Editor at GQ in 2011, before leaving the magazine in 2012. Later that year Fennessey was hired by Bill Simmons to act as Chief Editor for Grantland, an ESPN-owned pop culture and sports website, for which he moved to Los Angeles, California. He served in this role and wrote numerous articles for Grantland from 2012 to 2015. In May of 2015, Simmons's contract with ESPN was not renewed, spurring him to leave Grantland. John Skipper, President of ESPN, offered Fennessey the now-vacant Editor-in-Chief role, which Fennessey refused, deciding instead to leave with Simmons. On October 30, 2015, Grantland was officially shut down by ESPN.

Fennessey, Simmons, and fellow Grantland editors Juliet Litman, Mallory Rubin, and Chris Ryan left ESPN to start their own website, The Ringer, a sports and pop culture website and podcast network. The Ringer launched on March 14, 2016, with Fennessey serving as Editor-in-Chief. In August of 2018 Fennessey was promoted to Head of Content and Chief Content Officer at The Ringer, positions he still holds. The Ringer's podcast network proved to be quite successful, spurring Spotify, a music streaming service, to buy the company for $250 million in February of 2020. Spotify announced it would be partnering with Netflix to bring multiple Ringer podcasts to the video streaming service, including Fennessey's own podcast, The Big Picture, in October 2025.

On January 13, 2017, Fennessey launched The Big Picture podcast through The Ringer network. Amanda Dobbins joined in 2018 as co-host, where they began reviewing films and discussing news in the film industry. In July of 2025, Time Magazine named The Big Picture in their list of "The 100 Best Podcasts of All Time". Fennessey has interviewed numerous filmmakers on The Big Picture, with notable names including: Paul Thomas Anderson, Ari Aster, Sean Baker, John Carpenter, Park Chan-wook, Damien Chazelle, Jon M. Chu, Sofia Coppola, Emerald Fennell, Alex Garland, Greta Gerwig, Luca Guadagnino, Todd Haynes, Werner Herzog, Bong Joon Ho, Ron Howard, Barry Jenkins, Charlie Kaufman, Adam McKay, Jordan Peele, Eli Roth, the Safdie brothers, Céline Sciamma, Steven Spielberg, Quentin Tarantino, and Denis Villeneuve. They have also interviewed actors and actresses, including: Antonio Banderas, Nicolas Cage, Paul Dano, Leonardo DiCaprio, Jesse Eisenberg, Andrew Garfield, Ethan Hawke, Tracy Letts, Elisabeth Moss, Carey Mulligan, Edward Norton, Keanu Reeves, and Amanda Seyfried.

In addition to journalism and podcasting, Fennessey has produced documentary films and television programs, typically focusing on music and sports. He has served as executive producer on multiple documentaries through HBO Films, most notably Woodstock 99: Peace, Love, and Rage.

== Filmography ==
| Year | Title | Credit | Notes |
|---|---|---|---|
| 2013 | Just Passing Through | Producer; Cinematographer | Short film |
| 2013–2016 | 30 for 30 Shorts | Production Support (26 episodes) | Short documentary film series |
| 2020 | Women of Troy | Producer | Documentary film |
| 2020 | Showbiz Kids | Producer | Documentary film |
| 2021 | Woodstock 99: Peace, Love, and Rage | Executive producer | Documentary film |
| 2021 | Listening to Kenny G | Executive producer | Documentary film |
| 2021 | Jagged | Executive producer | Documentary film |
| 2021 | DMX: Don't Try to Understand | Executive producer | Documentary film |
| 2021–2024 | Music Box | Executive producer (5 episodes) | TV documentary series |
| 2023 | Destination NBA: A G League Odyssey | Executive producer | Documentary film |
| 2024 | Mr. McMahon | Executive producer (3 episodes) | TV documentary mini-series |
| 2024 | Yacht Rock: A DOCKumentary | Executive producer | Documentary film |
| 2025 | Counting Crows: Have You Seen Me Lately? | Executive producer | Documentary film |
| 2025 | Wizkid: Long Live Lagos | Executive producer | Documentary film |
