= The Ringer (website) =

American sports and pop culture website

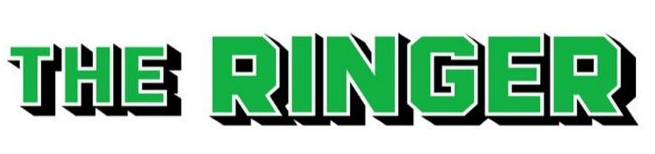

- Website type: Sports, popular culture
- Parent: Spotify
- Website: theringer.com
- Commercial: Yes
- Launched: March 14, 2016; 10 years ago

The Ringer is a sports and pop culture website and podcast network, founded by sportswriter Bill Simmons in 2016 and acquired by Spotify in 2020.

== History ==
The Ringer was launched in March 2016 by Bill Simmons, who brought along several editors who had previously worked with him on Grantland, an ESPN-owned blog he operated from 2011 to 2015. At launch, The Ringer had a staff of 43 and focused primarily on sports and pop culture as content areas, with a few writers also working on technology and politics. HBO, the network on which Simmons hosted his weekly television program Any Given Wednesday for one season in 2016, was an initial investor in the website.

The website was previously published on the Medium platform. In May 2017, The Ringer entered into an advertising and technology partnership with Vox Media (owner of SB Nation), under which Vox would handle advertising sales, and give the site access to its in-house Chorus publishing platform.

Former Grantland writers who have since written for or worked for The Ringer include Mark Titus, Shea Serrano, Ben Lindbergh, Robert Mays, Andy Greenwald, Sean Fennessey, Chris Ryan, Mallory Rubin, Juliet Litman, Craig Gaines, Bryan Curtis, David Shoemaker, Ryan O'Hanlon, Danny Chau, Jason Concepcion, Riley McAtee, Joe Fuentes, Tate Frazier, and Amanda Dobbins.

In May 2018, The Ringer published a story by Ben Detrick about Bryan Colangelo, then the general manager (GM) of the Philadelphia 76ers, and his apparent use of various Twitter accounts to criticize players and defend himself. This led to Colangelo's resignation on June 7, 2018.

In August 2019, 66 of The Ringer's 90 editorial staff members voted to unionize with the Writers Guild of America, East (WGAE). The union was voluntarily recognized by The Ringer's management four days later.

On February 5, 2020, subscription music streaming service Spotify announced it was acquiring The Ringer for an estimated $195 million and up to an additional $55 million in performance-driven incentives.

In April 2021, writers and producers ratified their first collective agreement with Gimlet Media and The Ringer. It would last three years, with a minimum base salary of $57,000 for The Ringer staff. Absent was any provision for worker ownership of content created.

In October 2025, a number of Ringer video podcasts were acquired by Netflix for exclusive video distribution on the Netflix platform. These podcasts included The Bill Simmons Show, The Zach Lowe Show, The McShay Show, The Rewatchables, Conspiracy Theories, and others. They began airing on Netflix beginning in January 2026.

In January 2026, Good Hang with Amy Poehler, which is The Ringer’s most popular podcast, won the inaugural Golden Globe Award for best podcast.

== Content ==
Like the content on the website, The Ringer's podcast network covers both sports and pop culture. The flagship podcast, The Bill Simmons Podcast, is an interview show hosted by Simmons, featuring other Ringer writers and podcast hosts as well as athletes, filmmakers, comedians, and pop culture figures. Other sports-related podcasts include The Zach Lowe Show (NBA), The McShay Show (NFL), Fairway Rollin’ (Golf), The Mismatch (NBA), The Ringer F1 Show (F1), The Ringer Fantasy Football Show, The Ringer NFL Show, and The Ringer NBA Show. Non-sports podcasts include The Rewatchables (Movies), The Big Picture (Movies), The Dave Chang Show (Food), Recipe Club (Food), Dissect (Music Analysis), Conspiracy Theories, and Serial Killers (True Crime).

Former podcasts include Keepin' it 1600, a politics podcast featuring former Obama speechwriters Jon Favreau and Dan Pfeiffer. After leaving The Ringer, the hosts of Keepin' it 1600 created a new podcast in 2017 called Pod Save America as part of their own new media company, Crooked Media.

In 2017, The Ringer began the video podcast series Talk the Thrones, an aftershow for Game of Thrones hosted by The Ringer staff writers and live streamed on Twitter. Talk the Thrones is a continuation of After the Thrones, which aired on HBO.

The Ringer also premiered Binge Mode in 2017, a podcast hosted by Mallory Rubin and Jason Concepcion. The show first recapped all seven season of Game of Thrones and then went on to do close reads of the Harry Potter series (books and films) and Marvel movies. The podcast ended in 2021.

2020 marked the debut of the Higher Learning podcast with Van Lathan and Rachel Lindsay. In the podcast, the two cohosts delve into topics including Black culture, politics, sports, and current events. The podcast has been nominated for the Outstanding Society and Culture Podcast award at the NAACP Image Awards for their 54th, 55th, and 56th editions.

Amy Poehler’s Good Hang with Amy Poehler podcast won the inaugural “Best Podcast” award at the 83rd Golden Globes in 2026.

== Personalities ==
Notable current employees include:

- Zach Lowe, NBA analyst and podcaster
- Juliet Litman, podcaster
- Mallory Rubin, host of Binge Mode and House of R
- Todd McShay, NFL draft analyst and podcaster
- Andy Greenwald, writer and pop-culture podcaster
- Rob Harvilla, rock critic
- David Jacoby, podcaster and sports journalist
- Rachel Lindsay, media personality and podcaster
- Van Lathan, journalist, producer, podcaster, and political commentator
- Matthew Belloni, founding partner at Puck and entertainment industry podcaster
- Tyson Apostol, winner of the reality TV show Survivor
- Tom Pelissero, NFL insider
- Amanda Dobbins, co-host of The Big Picture
- Sean Fennessey, co-host of The Big Picture and The Rewatchables
- Amy Poehler, comedian, actress, and host of Good Hang with Amy Poehler

Notable former employees include:

- J.J. Redick, retired NBA player and current coach of the Los Angeles Lakers
- Mark Titus, podcaster and former college basketball player
- Shea Serrano, podcaster
- Jon Favreau, podcaster and former director of speechwriting for President Barack Obama
- Dan Pfeiffer, podcaster and former adviser to President Barack Obama
- Michael Rapaport, actor and comedian
- Ryen Russillo, sports podcaster and former radio host and sports journalist
