= Harvey Kushner =

American global terrorism scholar (born 1941)

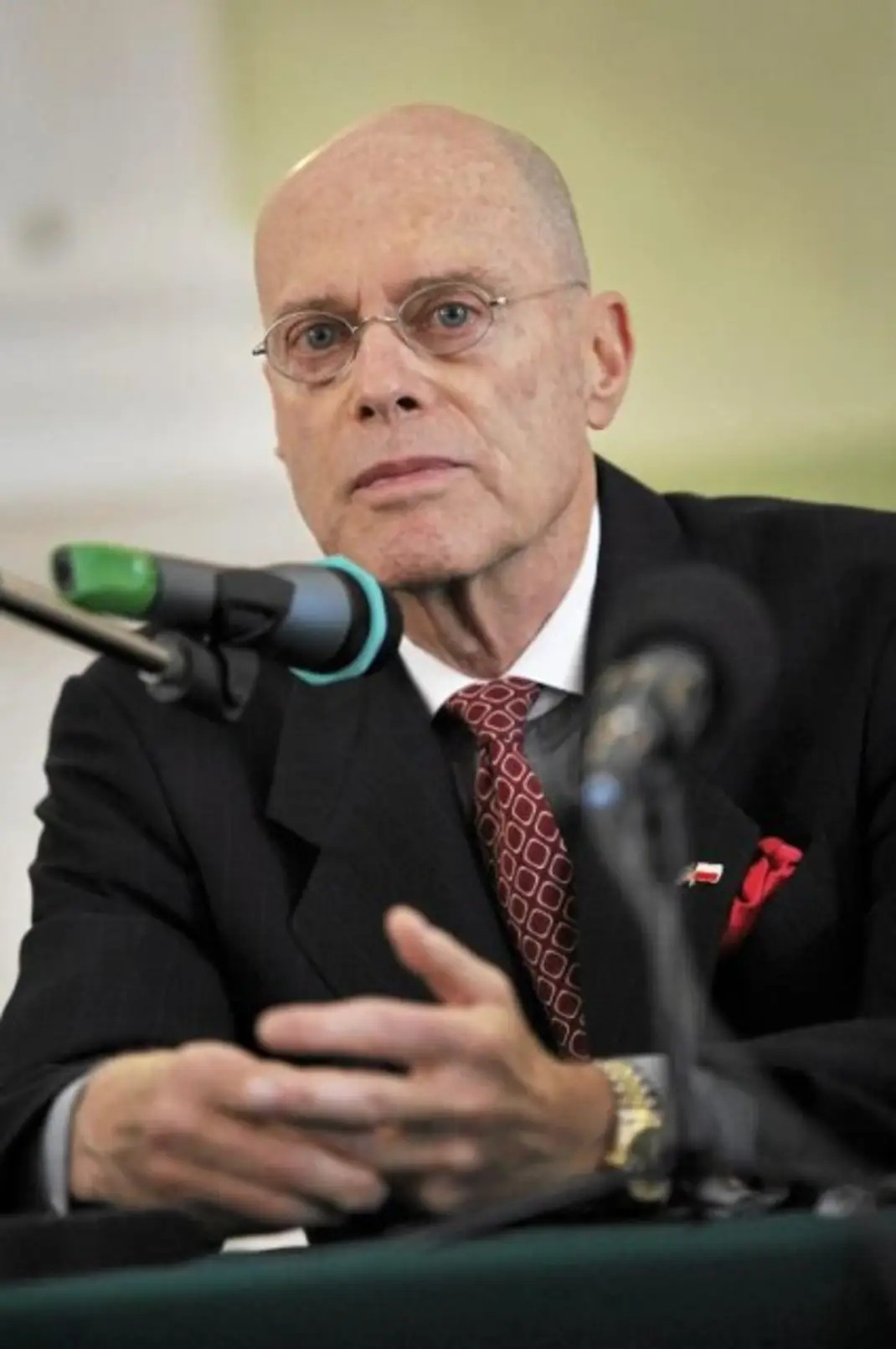
- Born: Harvey Wolf Kushner; December 9, 1941 (age 84); New York City, U.S.
- Education: Queens College, City University of New York; New York University
- Spouse: Sara Yerich
- Children: Meredith Hope
- Parents: Albert Kushner (father); Iryne Kushner (mother)
- Scientific career
- Fields: Terrorism, Criminal Justice, Cyber Security
- Workplaces: Long Island University
- Website: www.harveykushner.com

Harvey Wolf Kushner (born December 9, 1941) is an American scholar of global terrorism. Chair of the Department of Criminal Justice, The Roosevelt School, Long Island University, Brookville, New York. Author of numerous writings and five books on terrorism including the multi-award winning Encyclopedia of Terrorism (SAGE Publications). Chairman of the Praesidium and Academician of the European Academy of Sciences of Ukraine. Member of the international editorial board of the American Behavioral Scientist.

== Early life and education ==
Kushner was born in 1941 in New York City, NY; son of Albert and Iryne (Fieman) Kushner. He graduated from Queens College of the City University of New York in 1969 with a B.A. in political science. He received his M.S. degree in 1970 and his Ph.D with distinction in political science in 1974 from New York University.

== Career ==
=== Long Island University ===
In 1974, he joined Long Island University, where he held various administrative positions ranging from the Coordinator of Graduate Studies for the College of Liberal Arts and Sciences to the Director of the Homeland Security and Terrorism Institute.

As professor and chair of the Department of Criminal Justice and director of the Homeland Security and Terrorism Institute, Kushner has been noted for his attention to innovative curriculum development. After hiring two Internal Revenue Service agents to teach a course on financial investigations, the New York Times reported, "It's a course designed to teach snoops-in-training to shine the cold light of the law on the murkiest corners of Form 1040 or the most subtly laundered ill-gotten gains."

Kushner has emphasized the importance of cyber technologies and their impact on society and criminality. He has advocated for more cooperation between the public and private sectors. Kushner believes money and education can address the issues brought about by the cyber age.

Kushner has organized numerous symposia on national security and criminal justice topics to both educate and train the academic and professional communities alike. Alumni have gone on to head the New York State Office of Public Safety and the Nassau County Police Department.

=== New York's law enforcement agencies ===
Prior to the September 11 attacks and continuing until today, Kushner advised, educated, and trained police personnel throughout the State of New York. He has held terrorism training seminars for law enforcement agencies within New York State including the New York State Association of Chiefs of Police, New York State Crime Prevention Coalition, Mid-Hudson Crime Prevention Association, Long Island Association of Crime Prevention Officers, New York State Park Police, New York State Police, Orangeburg Police Department, Nassau Сounty Police Department, Suffolk County Police Department, Freeport Police Department, Rockville Centre Police Department, Old Brookville Police Department, Hempstead Police Department, Port Washington Police District to name a few. Kushner currently serves as the Education Advisor for the Nassau County Municipal Police Chiefs Association, a post he has held since 1991.

=== Work with federal agencies ===
Prior to the September 11 attacks, Kushner had close ties to a number of federal agencies. In 1993, Kushner was retained by the Federal Aviation Administration to identify transnational and international terrorists that might target civil aviation. In 1998, he advised the FBI's Behavioral Science Unit on identifying and developing a protocol to identify transnational terrorist threats within the United States. In both 1995 and 1997, he trained the staff of the U.S. Probation Department of the Eastern District on how to identify possible terrorists under their supervision. In 1996, the U.S. Drug Enforcement Administration had him train their agents on drug trafficking and its relationship to terrorism.

=== Work with Nassau County District Attorney ===
By the mid 1990s, crime in Nassau County had dropped sharply; however, the public's perception said otherwise. County residents feared going out at night and businesses were suffering. District Attorney Denis Dillon turned to Kushner to determine the reason for this unwarranted fear of crime. Covering the period 1975 to 1994, Kushner used statistical crime data for Broward County, Fla., near Miami; Oakland County, Mich., near Detroit; Terrant, Tex., near Dallas County, and Orange County, Calif., near Los Angeles." Kushner found that Nassau County's crime data were much lower than his national sample due to the county's favorable societal factors that correlate with low crime such as "older, richer population with a high prevalence of two-parent families." In his report released on November 21, 1995, at a press conference with District Attorney Dillon and Nassau County Police Commissioner Donald Kane, Kushner attributed the unwarranted fear of crime to "an eager media [that] spends a disproportionate amount of air time playing the 'crime card.' Cleary, a blitzkrieg of media coverage is bound to make people fearful of crime." Kushner also stated, "There was this perception, because we had a few major and very famous crimes like Colin Ferguson and [Joel] David Rifkin and Joey Buttafuocco, that people couldn't leave the house."

=== Crime Stoppers International ===
From 1995 - 1998, Kushner served as a special consultant on terrorism to Crime Stoppers International. The latter is a private group that gathers anonymous tips for local police departments via the telephone and to a lesser extent the Internet. In 1996, Kushner and Thomas Oberle approached the FBI with a well financed plan to establish a National Crime Stoppers program in conjunction with the FBI. They would build a national toll-free hotline that could be used by the FBI to gather tips related to federal crimes and the growing threat of terrorism in the United States. After going back and forth negotiating with the FBI for almost two years, the offer was declined in March 1998.

=== Terrorism 1999 Anniversaries Calendar ===
In 1989 and in conjunction with the International Association of Counter Terrorism and Security Professionals, Kushner authored the "Terrorism 1999 Anniversaries Calendar". The Calendar, as the New York Times wrote, "documents the histories and anniversaries of bombings, assassinations, hijackings and standoffs affecting Americans over the past 30 years with the graphic detail of an action movie." The calendar was used by law enforcement agencies throughout the world to keep a keen eye on dates that might trigger a terrorist attack.

=== Ancillary Meeting at the United Nations 10th Congress on the Prevention of Crime ===
In 2000, Kushner was invited to serve as an individual expert and chair an international panel on victimization for the United Nations in Vienna, Austria, at their Ancillary Meeting at the United Nations 10th Congress on the Prevention of Crime (Terrorist Victimization: Prevention, Control, and Recovery).

=== Post 9/11 ===
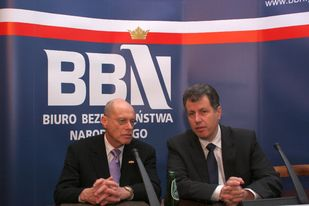
Kushner at National Security Bureau, Poland

From 2001 to 2008, he provided data analytics on Al Qaeda and the September 11, 2001 attacks for the U.S. Naval War College in Newport, RI; U.S. Air Force Special Operations School, MacDill AFB, FL; U.S. Coast Guard, Jones Beach, NY; U.S. Marine Corps Base, Quantico, VA; and the U.S. Army Special Operations Command, Fort Bragg, NC. The FBI, U. S. Immigration and Naturalization Service, U.S. Customs Service, U.S. Probation for the Middle District of Florida, and the U.S. Pretrial Services also called on him to provide data analytics. He also evaluated equipment requests for countering terrorist events for the Department of Homeland Security and the Federal Emergency Management Agency from 2005 to 2008.

At the behest of Władysław Stasiak the head of the National Security Bureau, Republic of Poland, Professor Kushner worked with top officials at the National Security Bureau's Headquarters in Warsaw on December 2, 2008, on the subject of criminality and cyber terrorism. In 2010, Kushner served as an expert for the Polish Parliamentary Committee tasked with investigating the April 10, 2010, plane crash that killed Polish President Lech Kaczynski. Also in 2008, at the behest of the Commissioner of Civil Rights Protection of the Republic of Poland, Janusz Kochanowski, Kushner represented the United States at the International Session of the 60th Anniversary of the Universal Declaration of Human Rights at Auschwitz Birkenau German Nazi Concentration and Extermination Camp, Oswiecim, Poland.

=== U.S. Probation Department ===
From 2002 to 2005, Kushner worked as the terrorist analyst for the U.S. Probation Department of the Eastern District of New York. His duties included providing intelligence analyses to the chief federal probation officer on all matters related to domestic, transnational, and international terrorism and developing protocols to monitor individuals with suspected terrorist ties while they were under the supervision of the probation department.

=== Expert testimony ===
Immediately following the September 11, 2001, attacks on the United States, Kushner gave expert testimony on terrorism and safety in New York City public spaces before the Committee of Public Safety of the Council of the New York City. In 2004, the 9/11 commission invited him to participate in the VIP briefing prior to the release of its final report. Kushner also appeared as a terrorism expert before the Department of Homeland Security's Homeland Security Advisory Council's Future of Terrorism Task Force in 2006. At their annual training conference in 2015, the New York State Chiefs of Police had Kushner address the current terrorist threat and what it means to local police.

=== Expert witness testimony ===
As an expert witness, Kushner has experience with several high-profile international terrorism-related court cases. In 1997, Kushner served as plaintiffs' expert witness and wrote the expert's report for a successful multimillion-dollar civil litigation arising out of the 1993 bombing of the World Trade Center (Duffy v. Port Authority of New York & New Jersey and Pesce v. Port Authority of New York & New Jersey). From 2000-2001, he served as an expert during the U.S. Embassy Bombing trial (U.S. vs. Usama bin Laden, et al.). In 2001, he wrote the expert's report in a landmark matrimonial case (Micheline Charpie v. Pierre Allain Lucien Charpie) in which the plaintiff argued that it was safe for her children to remain with her in New York City after the terror attacks of September 11, 2001. He also served as an expert from 2001 to 2003 in a civil litigation involving airport security procedures at New York's MacArthur Airport (Andrew P. Oliveri v. International Brotherhood of Teamsters, Local 815 and John R. Cuite).

Kushner has also provided counsel and expert witness advise to families of the 9/11 attacks, the Pan Am 103 bombing, suicide bombings in Israel, and the Empire State Building shooting. He also consulted on cases involving terrorism in Egypt and state sponsored terrorism involving the Islamic Republic of Iran.

=== Media ===
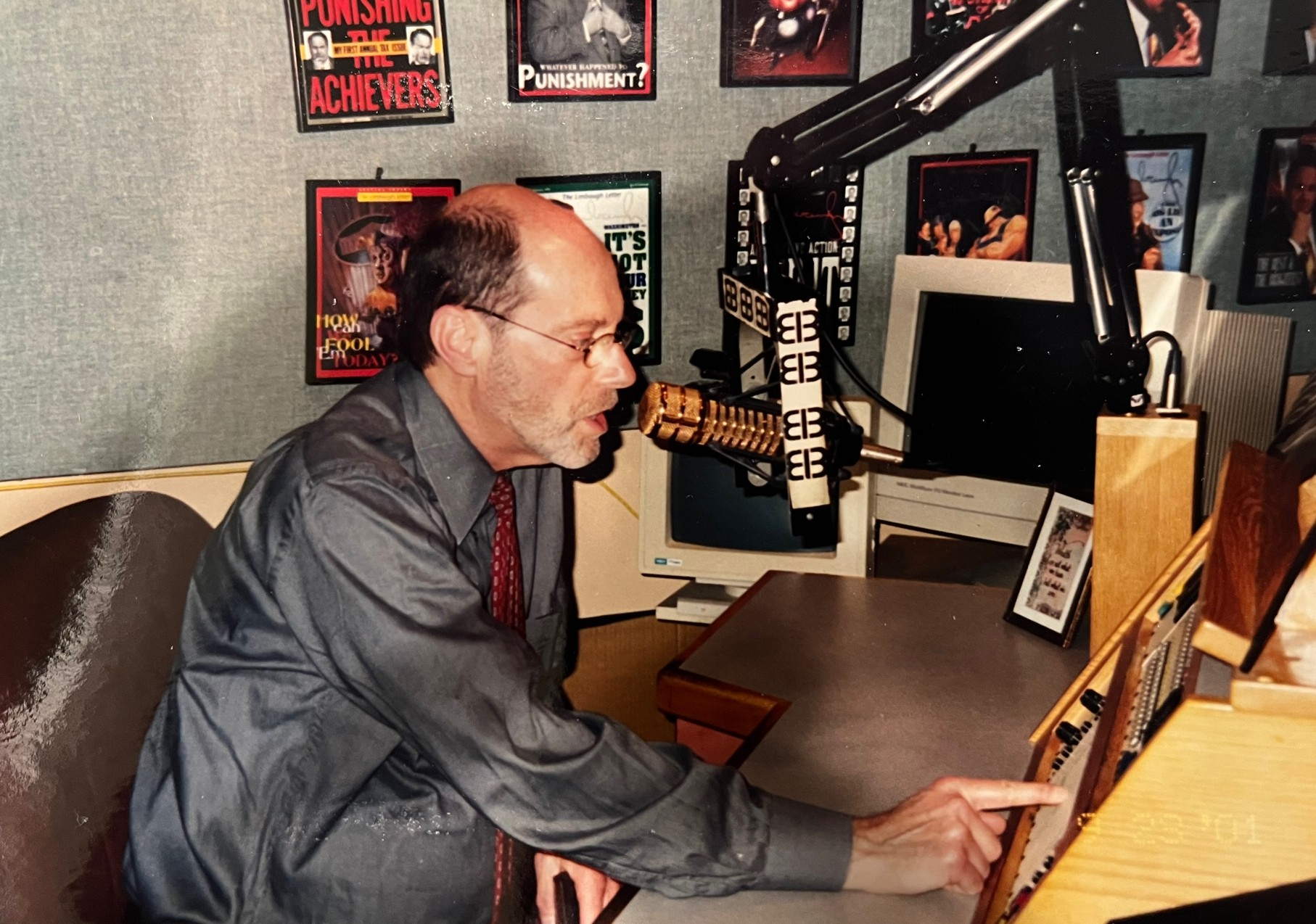
Kushner broadcasting after 9/11 attacks on his show on 77 TalkRadio WABC

On the morning of the September 11, 2001, attacks on the United States, the media immediately turned to Kushner for his expertise. In the days following the attacks, he was called on to host a weekly call-in talk show on terrorism for one of the most-listened-to radio stations in the country, 77 TalkRadio WABC in New York. Kushner's profiling skills were featured in the Mugshots episode entitled "Mohammed Atta: Soldier of Terror."

Prior to the 9/11 attacks, the media went to Kushner for anything that smacked of terrorism. The print media especially relied on him for analyses of Al-Qaeda and Osama bin Laden.

From exposing terrorists on the FOX News Channel's The O'Reilly Factor to explaining the meaning of high alert on the Oprah Winfrey Show to discussing airport security on CNN's Larry King Live, Kushner has appeared on all the major cable and television networks. Kushner has also worked as a guest host and contributor for the FOX News Channel's millennium coverage in 2000 and MSNBC's New Year's Eve 2001 celebrations in Times Square, NY.

On the radio, Kushner was a frequent guest of the "Heavy Hundred," Talkers Magazine's most important radio talk show hosts. He also did commentary for Michael Savage on his "Savage Nation," which at the time was the second most-listened to radio show in the United States with 20 million listeners. For many years, the Dr. Harvey Kushner Show was a fixture on WGBB 1240 AM, Long Island's first radio station and one of the oldest in the country.

As a credentialed member of the working press from 1997-2012, Kushner wrote an aviation security column entitled The Middle of the Runway for the Airport Press and was the paper's associate editor.

Kushner's editorials generated much controversy from the liberal media. For example, MSNBC's Countdown with Keith Olbermann criticized Kushner for his column in Human Events on CNN's Jack Cafferty's remarks on Senator John McCain's condemnation of Russia's invasion of Georgia in 2008. On August 19, 2008, Olbermann awarded Kushner the dubious distinction of being his "Worst Person in the World," a highly controversial segment of his nightly show that supposedly identified evil. Olbermann mockingly stated, "But our winner is Harvey Kushner of the woeful HumanEvents.com–ugh, ugh!"

== Awards and honors ==
The following is a partial list of some of Kushner's awards and honors:

- Commissioner's Award for Advancing Professionalism in Law Enforcement, Nassau County Police Department, New York (1991)
- Mayor's Citation for Work with COMBAT Task Force, Village of Freeport, New York (1992).
- Work with Churchill Fellow Award, Tasmania Police, Tasmania, Australia (1992).
- Certificate of Appreciation, Jericho Union Free School District, Jericho, New York (1993).
- Distinguished Guest Speaker Award, JFK International Airport Chamber of Commerce (1996).
- Certificate of Appreciation, Suffolk County Police Department, Eastern Armed Robbery Conference (1996).
- Certificate of Appreciation, American Society of Industrial Security (1997).
- Award for Editorial Board Service, University of Minnesota and the Journal of Correctional Education (1997).
- Certificate of Appreciation for Assistance and Cooperation with the New York Field Office, U.S. Secret Service (2000).
- Professional Expertise and Generous Support Award, Orangeburg Police Department, New York (2002).
- Library Journal 2002 Outstanding Reference Source (for Encyclopedia of Terrorism) (2002).
- RUSA 2003 Outstanding Reference Source (for Encyclopedia of Terrorism) (2004).
- Booklist Editor's Choice Best of 2003 (for Encyclopedia of Terrorism) (2003).
- Certificate of Appreciation, Suffolk County Police Department, New York (2006).
- Distinguished Speaker Award, Southern Arkansas University Tech (2008).
- Dow Chemical Visiting Scholar, Saginaw Valley State University, Michigan (2009).

== Publications ==
Professor Kushner's many writings on terrorism and related matters have appeared in academic, professional, and trade publications throughout the world. He has served as an editor and member of the editorial boards for a number of journals. He currently serves on the international boards of the American Behavioral Scientist (2001- ) and the Journal of Applied Security Research (2005 -). As a referee and critical reviewer, Kushner has contributed to numerous journals and publishers. Below is a small sample of his work.

=== Books ===
- (1980) Understanding Basic Statistics: A Structured Approach (San Francisco, CA: Holden-Day).
- (1980) Instructor's Manual for Understanding Basic Statistics: A Structured Approach (San Francisco, CA: Holden-Day).
- (1998) (Ed.) The Future of Terrorism: Violence in the New Millennium (Thousand Oaks, CA: Sage Publications).
- (1998) Terrorism in America: A Structured Approach to Understanding the Terrorist Threat (Springfield, IL: Charles C. Thomas).
- (2002) (Ed.) Essential Readings on Political Terrorism: Analyses of Problems and Prospects for the Twenty-first Century (NY: Gordian Knot).
- (2002) Encyclopedia of Terrorism (Thousand Oaks, CA: Sage Publications).
- (2004) Holy War on the Home Front. The Secret Islamic Terror Network in the United States (NY: Sentinel).

=== Edited journals ===
- "Domestic and International Terrorism," Journal of Contemporary Criminal Justice, 11 (February 1995).
- "Terrorism in the 21st Century," American Behavioral Scientist, 44 (February 2001).
- "Cyberterrorism in the 21st Century," American Behavioral Scientist, 45 (February 2002).
- "Nuclear and Radiological Terrorism," American Behavioral Scientist, 46 (February 2003).
- "Revisiting Terrorism in the 21st Century," American Behavioral Scientist, 68 (February 2024).
- "War in Ukraine," American Behavioral Scientist, 67 (March 2023).

=== Other publications ===
- "The New Middle Eastern Terrorists," Journal of the International Association of Law Enforcement Intelligence Analysts, 8 (February 1994), 41 - 46.
- "The New Terrorism: The Shape of Things to Come," Counterterrorism & Security International, 2 (Fall/Winter 1995), 10 - 11.
- Brent Smith, Terrorism in America: Pipe Bombs and Pipe Dreams (NY: State University of New York Press, 1994) in theInternational Journal of Offender Therapy and Comparative Criminal Justice, 39 (Winter 1995), 378 - 380.
- "Can Security Measures Stop Terrorism?" Security Management, 40 (June 1996), 132 -133.
- "Suicide Bombers: What Makes them Tick?" Counterterrorism & Security International, 3 (Summer 1996), 26 - 29.
- "Suicide Bombers: Business as Usual," Studies in Conflict & Terrorism, 19 (October/December 1996), 329 - 337.
- "Drugs and Terrorism in the Bekka Valley," The NARC Officer, XV (March/April 1996), 43 - 44
- "What's A Law Enforcement Agency to Do? Counterterrorism & Security International, 5 (Spring 1998), 32 - 33.
- Co-author, "Financing Terrorist Activities Through Coupon Fraud and Counterfeiting," Counterterrorism & Security International, 5 (Summer 1998), 10 - 12.
- "Today's Ku Klux Klan," Counterterrorism & Security Reports, 7 (1998), 24 - 25.
- "Bombing of Atlanta Centennial Olympic Park," Violence in America: An Encyclopedia, ed. by Ronald Gottesman (Vol. 1, New York: Charles Scribner's Sons, 1999), pp. 140 - 141.
- "Bombing and Bomb Scares," Violence in America: An Encyclopedia, ed. by Ronald Gottesman (Vol. 1, New York: Charles Scribner's Sons, 1999), pp. 155 - 160.
- "Letter Bombs," Violence in America: An Encyclopedia, ed. by Ronald Gottesman (Vol. 2, New York: Charles Scribner's Sons, 1999), pp. 257 - 259.
- "Unabomber," Violence in America: An Encyclopedia, ed. by Ronald Gottesman (Vol. 3, New York: Charles Scribner's Sons, 1999), pp. 349 - 351.
- "World Trade Center Bombing," Violence in America: An Encyclopedia, ed. by Ronald Gottesman (Vol. 3, New York: Charles Scribner's Sons, 1999), pp. 475 - 476.
- "The Price of Stopping Terrorists," New York Times (October 18, 2000), p. 30.
- "Chertoff's Mission," AM New York (January 14–16, 2005), p. 10.
- "Correctly Identifying our Enemies," Newsday (August 15, 2006), p. A35.
- "Terrorism in America in the Twenty-First Century: Revisiting my Prognostications," American Behavioral Scientist, 68 (February 2024), pp. 169 - 194.
- "Putin's Invasion of Ukraine and the New Face of Terrorism," Granite of Science, 10 (December 2022), 42 – 47.
- "Technology and its Impact on the Academy," CXOTECH Magazine, 20 (2022 – 2023), 22 – 23.
