= Steven Hyden =

American music critic (born 1977)

- Born: September 7, 1977 (age 49); Appleton, Wisconsin, U.S.
- Education: University of Wisconsin-Eau Claire
- Occupations: Music critic, podcast host
- Employer: Uproxx
- Notable work: Your Favorite Band Is Killing Me; Twilight of the Gods; Hard to Handle (with Steve Gorman); This Isn't Happening; Long Road

Steven Hyden (born September 7, 1977) is an American music critic, author, and podcast host.

Hyden was the national music editor at The A.V. Club before serving as Grantland staff writer and his current role as Uproxx's cultural critic. He has written album reviews for Pitchfork and contributed articles to Rolling Stone. As an author, he has written books analyzing the music of artists such as Radiohead, Pearl Jam and Bruce Springsteen, as well as books exploring music rivalries, classic rock and a memoir about The Black Crowes co-written with former drummer Steve Gorman.

He co-hosts the podcasts Indiecast (with Ian Cohen, sponsored by Amazon Music) and Never Ending Stories (with Ian Grant and Evan Laffer), and previously hosted the podcasts, 36 From the Vault, Rivals, Break Stuff: The Story of Woodstock '99, and Celebration Rock. He also has appeared as a pundit in various music documentaries, and was the story producer of HBO's 2024 film Yacht Rock: A Dockumentary. He currently publishes Evil Speakers on Substack.

== Early life ==
Steven Hyden was born on September 7, 1977 in Wisconsin. He graduated from Appleton East High School, then the University of Wisconsin–Eau Claire in 2000.

== Career ==
Hyden began his career with The Post-Crescent in 1993; then 15 years old, he contributed to a weekly section for teenagers (his first submission, hand-written, was a review of the 1993 album Zooropa by U2). He continued working for the paper as an intern while in college, and then joined the staff as a full-time reporter when he graduated in 2000.

Hyden began writing for The A.V. Club in 2006, and became the website's National Music Editor from 2011 to 2012. He joined Grantland as a staff writer in the summer of 2012 until it was shut down by ESPN in 2015. He joined Uproxx as the site's cultural critic in July 2016. His music criticism has been published in several other outlets including Pitchfork, Rolling Stone, Slate, American Songwriter and Salon.com.

Hyden has been regularly featured as a pundit in documentaries, including CNN's The Nineties, The 2000s and The 2010s, and HBO's Billy Joel: And So It Goes. He has also worked behind the scenes on music documentaries, including HBO's Woodstock 99: Peace, Love And Rage (as consulting producer) and Yacht Rock: A Dockumentary (as story producer).

== Podcasts ==
=== Celebration Rock ===
From January 2016 to December 2018, Hyden hosted the Celebration Rock podcast. A new episode debuted weekly on Monday afternoon and usually ran about 50–60 minutes in length. Hyden and his guests covered topics ranging from "Best Rock Albums of the '10's (so far)" to hour-long interviews with artists (such as The National's Matt Berninger, Deftones and David Crosby) and hosting other critics to discuss their famous works. The podcast mostly emphasized the current rock scene, but also dove into the past with episodes and interviews about The Replacements, Cheap Trick, and others. In 2018, The Philadelphia Inquirer named it one of the best music podcasts.

=== Indiecast ===
In July 2020, Hyden began co-hosting Indiecast, a podcast about indie music news and trends, with Ian Cohen. The podcast was canceled by Uproxx in December 2025. It was revived in April 2026, now sponsored by Amazon Music.

=== Break Stuff: The Story of Woodstock '99 ===
From July 9, 2019 to August 27, 2019, Hyden hosted an eight-episode podcast about the Woodstock '99 festival on the subscription podcast network Luminary. He later appeared as an expert on the HBO documentary Woodstock 99: Peace, Love, And Rage.

=== Rivals ===
From February 6, 2020 to January 27, 2021, Hyden co-hosted Rivals, a podcast about rivalries between band-mates and contemporaries in rock, with Jordan Runtaugh.

=== 36 From the Vault ===
In January 2020, Hyden began co-hosting 36 From the Vault, a podcast about the Grateful Dead's live album series Dick's Picks, with co-host Rob Mitchum.

=== Never Ending Stories ===
In 2023, Hyden began co-hosting Never Ending Stories, a podcast about Bob Dylan's Never Ending Tour and other live recordings, with the hosts of Jokermen, an initially Dylan-themed podcast.

== Books ==
- Inventory: 16 Films Featuring Manic Pixie Dream Girls, 10 Great Songs Nearly Ruined by Saxophone, and 100 More Obsessively Specific Pop-Culture Lists (2009), a collection of lists from The A.V. Club.
- Whatever Happened to Alternative Nation? (2011), reflection on 1990s alternative rock that originally ran as a 10-part series at The A.V. Club.
- Your Favorite Band Is Killing Me (2016), essays on famous rivalries in popular music such as Oasis versus Blur, Beatles versus Rolling Stones, and Madonna versus Cyndi Lauper.
- Twilight of the Gods: A Journey to the End of Classic Rock (2018), documenting the history, decline and future of classic rock.
- Hard to Handle: The Life and Death of the Black Crowes (2019), a memoir by drummer Steve Gorman co-written with Hyden about Gorman's time as the drummer in the American rock band The Black Crowes.
- This Isn't Happening: Radiohead's 'Kid A' and the Beginning of the 21st Century (2020), about Radiohead's 2000 album Kid A and its broader cultural context and influence.
- Long Road: Pearl Jam and the Soundtrack of a Generation (2022), autobiographical history of Pearl Jam from Hyden's fan perspective.
- There Was Nothing You Could Do: Bruce Springsteen's 'Born In The U.S.A.' and the End of the Heartland (2024), about Bruce Springsteen's best-selling 1984 album Born in the U.S.A. and its historical political context.
- Is This It: The Never-Ending Rise and Fall of the Strokes (and Rock ‘n' Roll) (2026), examining The Strokes' career and the changing role of rock music in the 25 years since its release.
- U2: The Last Biggest Band in the World (2028), chronicling the highs and lows of U2.

== Personal life ==
Hyden is married with two children and lives in Minneapolis.
