= Mallory Rubin =

American editor and podcaster (born 1986)

- Born: September 15, 1986 (age 40); Baltimore, Maryland, U.S.
- Education: Syracuse University
- Spouse: Adam Levine (m. 2014)

Mallory Rubin (born 1986) is an American editor and podcaster. She is most well-known for her work at The Ringer, and for the Binge Mode pop culture podcast which she co-hosted with Jason Concepcion. She is one of the founding editors of The Ringer and currently serves as Editor-In-Chief.

== Early life and education ==
Rubin is a Baltimore native. She grew up in Reisterstown and is an alumna of Syracuse University.

== Career ==
Rubin worked at Sports Illustrated and as an editor at Grantland. In 2015, she was one of several Grantland staffers who left with founder Bill Simmons to join HBO; Grantland shut down soon after.

She later began working as a writer and editor at The Ringer and became a co-host of the podcast Binge Mode. She was also a co-host of the Game of Thrones discussion shows After the Thrones on HBO and Talk the Thrones on Twitter, along with fellow Ringer employees Jason Concepcion and Chris Ryan. Also in 2019, Rubin was a panelist at a session about Game of Thrones at SXSW in Austin, Texas.

In 2017, Time Magazine included Binge Mode on its list of the year's Top Ten Podcasts, and in 2019, after expanding its critical focus to include the Harry Potter series, the show was named the best podcast of the year by USA Today's For the Win.
