= Night Call =

Night Call(s) or Nightcall may refer to:

== Music ==
- Night Call (album), by Years & Years, or the title song, 2022
- Night Calls (album), by Joe Cocker, or the title song, 1991
- "Nightcall" (song), by Kavinsky, 2010; covered by London Grammar, 2013
- "Night Calls", a song by Mondo Generator from Hell Comes to Your Heart, 2012
- "Night Call", a song by Steve Aoki from Steve Aoki Presents Kolony, 2017

== Other uses ==
- Night Call (podcast), a 2018–2020 weekly call-in program
- Night Call (video game), a 2019 adventure game
- "Night Call" (The Twilight Zone), a 1964 TV episode
- Night Calls (TV series), a 1995–2007 Playboy TV program
- Night Call (film), a 2024 film by Michiel Blanchart
