= Hard to Handle =

Hard to Handle may refer to:

- Hard to Handle (film), a 1933 film starring James Cagney
- "Hard to Handle" (song), a 1968 song by Otis Redding, successfully covered by The Black Crowes
- Hard to Handle, a 1991 novel in the Nancy Drew spinoff series River Heights
- Hard to Handle, a 2001 novel by Kylie Brant
- Hard to Handle: The Life and Death of the Black Crowes, a 2019 memoir by Steve Gorman
