= Yacht Rock =

Yacht Rock may refer to:

- Yacht Rock (web series), an American web series
- Yacht rock, the musical style named after the web series
- Yacht Rock: A Dockumentary, a 2024 documentary about the musical style
- Yacht Rock 2, the 2019 album by hip hop producer The Alchemist
