= Ashley Flowers =

American podcast host (born 1989)

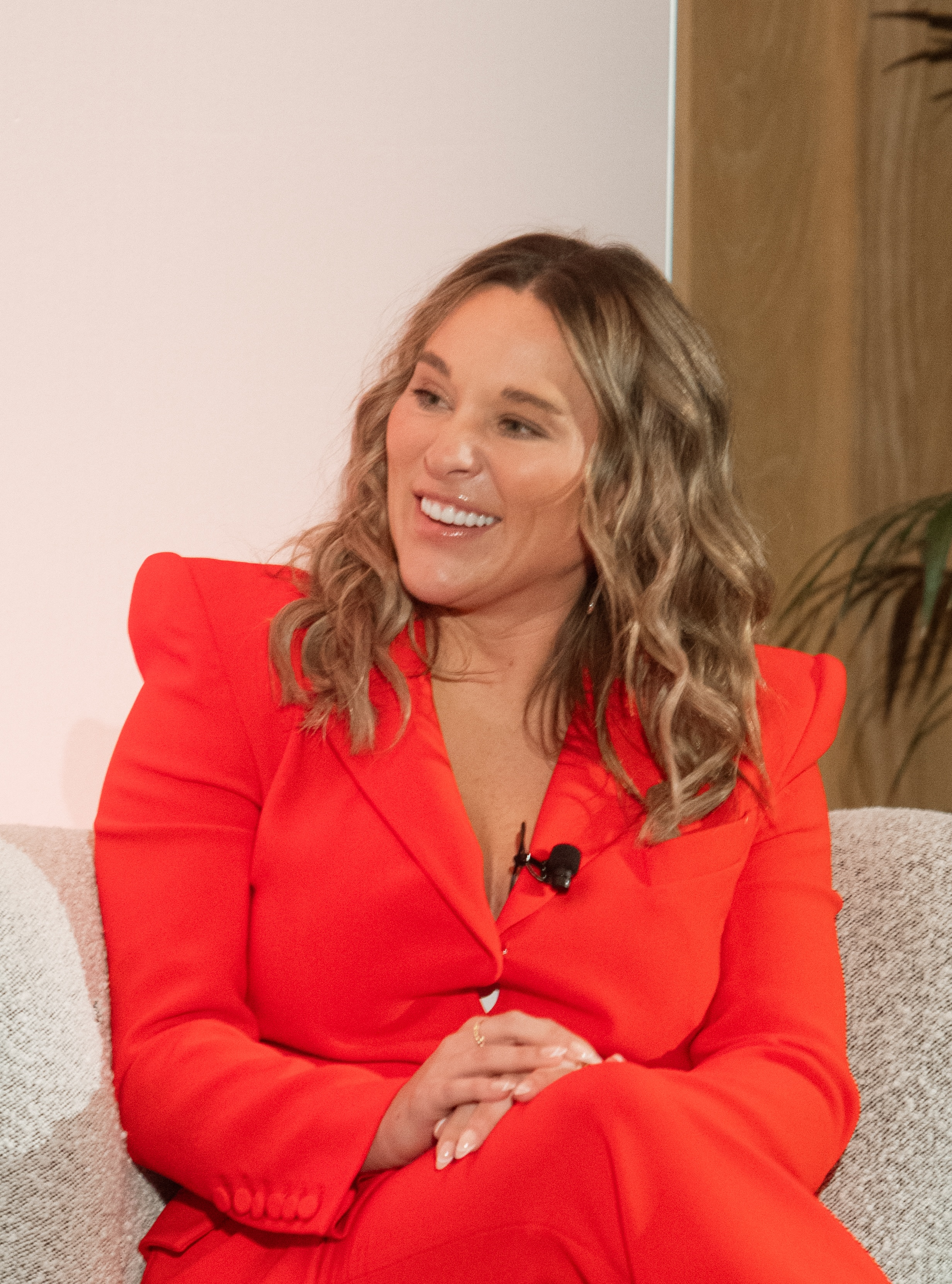
- Born: December 19, 1989 (age 36); South Bend, Indiana, U.S.
- Occupation: Podcaster
- Years active: 2017–present
- Known for: True crime podcasting
- Notable work: All Good People Here; Crime Junkie
- Website: crimejunkiepodcast.com

Ashley Flowers (born December 19, 1989) is an American podcaster, writer, and entrepreneur. She is the creator and host of Crime Junkie, a weekly true crime podcast that garners 10 million weekly listeners. Flowers was at the top of lists of podcasters in the United States in 2023 and 2024, with Crime Junkie achieving the largest female audience of any podcast in the country. In August 2022, Flowers' debut novel, All Good People Here, became a New York Times bestseller.

== Early life and education ==
Flowers has credited mystery and crime novels, such as the Nancy Drew series, and television shows like Matlock, as her childhood inspiration to become a cold case detective.

Flowers attended Arizona State University and earned a Bachelor of Science in biological services.

== Career ==
In her early career, Flowers worked in biomedical research and later transitioned into sales.

Flowers volunteered and eventually became a board member for Crime Stoppers of Central Indiana. She subsequently developed Murder Monday, a 20-minute local radio segment aimed at a younger audience, with each episode focusing on a different case. Flowers hosted Murder Monday for a year before creating the podcast Crime Junkie with Brit Prawat.

=== Podcasting ===
In 2017, Flowers founded the podcast network, Audiochuck, named after her dog, Charlie ("Chuck"). She invested her life savings of $13,000 into the company to fund its initial operations. She sourced her initial revenue through a combination of Patreon memberships and advertising.

Flowers signed a multiyear partnership between Audiochuck and SiriusXM, reportedly valued at over $100 million in 2021. The deal granted SiriusXM exclusivity over ad sales for all Audiochuck podcasts, including Crime Junkie, Anatomy of Murder, CounterClock, and Park Predators.

By July 2022, Audiochuck expanded to include 16 podcasts in its network, generating over 1.26 billion downloads, and employing nearly 30 people. That year, Audiochuck was ranked as the top free channel on Apple Podcasts and was the second most popular free podcast channel in 2023, following iHeartPodcasts.

The network produces various popular shows, including CounterClock, a 2020 podcast hosted by Delia D'Ambra and produced by Audiochuck, and Anatomy of Murder, which won the Webby Award for People's Voice Winner in 2022. In May 2024, Flowers launched the podcast series titled Crime Junkie AF, featuring guest discussions on various cases, as well as Crime Junkie Radio, the only true crime streaming channel on the SiriusXM app. Flowers announced the relaunch of her mystery podcast So Supernatural on September 6, 2024.

In November 2025, Audiochuck was sued by the hosts and creators of Anatomy of Murder, Anna-Sigga Nicolazzi and Scott Weinberger, for breach of contract. Nicolazzi and Weinberger alleged the full revenue share negotiated in the SiriusXM partnership was not received.

==== Crime Junkie ====
Ashley Flowers and Brit Prawat have co-hosted Crime Junkie, the flagship Audiochuck podcast, since 2017. The first episodes were recorded in an extra bedroom of Flowers' home, with Prawat joining via telephone from South Bend, Indiana. Crime Junkie quickly gained popularity in its first few years with Rolling Stone naming Crime Junkie one of the best true crime podcasts of 2018, leading Flowers and Prawat to announce a national Crime Junkie tour in July 2019. By 2022, Crime Junkie was the second most-listened-to podcast in the U.S., according to Edison Research. That same year, Crime Junkie was the No. 1 most-listened-to show on Apple Podcasts in the U.S., and was also recognized as the most followed and most shared show on the platform. In 2023, Crime Junkie maintained its position as the No. 1 most-listened-to podcast overall on Apple Podcasts in the U.S. As of 2024, Crime Junkie has over 1 billion downloads and more than 400 episodes.

In 2019, Flowers and Prawat were accused of plagiarizing content, in some cases verbatim, from various sources, including newspaper articles, other podcasts, and the TV show On the Case with Paula Zahn for Crime Junkie. Following the allegations and legal action by The Arkansas Democrat-Gazette by removing at least five episodes of Crime Junkie with Flowers stating to Variety that the episodes' "source material could no longer be found or properly cited".

Flowers later acknowledged her ignorance of proper attribution and now ensures that Crime Junkie episodes provide proper credit to source material.

==== The Deck ====
In February 2022, Flowers launched The Deck, a weekly series hosted by herself that focuses on cold cases with few leads. According to Flowers, she developed the idea while volunteering with Crime Stoppers, where she first encountered cold cases featured on playing cards distributed to prisons. The podcast quickly gained popularity, becoming the No. 1 new show in the U.S. on Apple Podcasts in 2022.

==== The Deck Investigates ====
In December 2022, The Deck Investigates, Flowers' first original investigative podcast, began an 11-city tour, exploring the 1984 murder of Darlene Hulse in Argos, Indiana. In 2023, The Deck Investigates ranked No. 3 on the list of the year's new shows on Apple Podcasts.

The second season of The Deck features Ada Haradine, a missing mother of two and homemaker, out of Elkhart, Indiana.

=== Nonprofit ===
In June 2020, Flowers founded the nonprofit Season of Justice, which provides grants to laboratories for DNA testing to solve cold cases. In 2021, Season of Justice received 501(c)(3) tax-exempt status. As of July 2021, the nonprofit had donated more than $225,000 to families and others involved with 31 cold cases. The organization has supported over 141 cases, including in 2024 helping to solve the 1975 Indianapolis "Slasher" cold case through DNA testing.

=== Writing ===
In January 2022, Flowers signed a publishing contract with Bantam Books for her debut novel, All Good People Here, co-written with Alex Kiester and based on a true crime cold case. All Good People Here was released on August 16, 2022, and became a New York Times bestseller. It received a favorable review from Publishers Weekly and was a Publishers Weekly bestseller.

In 2024, Flowers and Kiester announced they were working on a new book centered around sisterly relationships. The crime novel, The Missing Half, was published on May 6, 2025.

== Personal life ==
Flowers lives in Indiana with her husband Erik and daughter Josie. Chuck, the family dog and namesake of Flowers' company, Audiochuck, died in April 2025.
