= The Book of Basketball =

2009 book by Bill Simmons

The Book of Basketball: The NBA According to the Sports Guy
- Author: Bill Simmons
- Language: English
- Genre: Sports
- Publisher: ESPN Books
- Publication date: 2009
- Publication place: United States
- Media type: Print
- Pages: 736 pp
- ISBN: 978-0-345-51176-8
- Preceded by: Now I Can Die in Peace

The Book of Basketball: The NBA According to the Sports Guy is the second book by former ESPN columnist Bill Simmons. Published in 2009, it covers the history of the National Basketball Association (NBA). In 2019, Simmons launched a sequel podcast series, Book of Basketball 2.0, which analyses the evolution of the league since the book was published.

== Background ==
At the time of the book's publishing, Simmons had been writing under the name “The Sports Guy” for 12 years, 9 of them with ESPN, and was receiving 1.4 million page views per month. In 2006, he started developing the idea for The Book of Basketball, spending three years reading over 80 books on basketball and watching 400 game tapes.

Simmons's goal in the book was to figure out why some players or teams matter more than others. The original premise for the book was to "blow up the Basketball Hall of Fame and reconstruct it like an Egyptian pyramid." As he continued his research, he realized that there was "no real way to compare players from different eras without a common theme in place." Simmons derived an idea that he admitted was not perfect, but helped in finding a fair ranking system for players past and present. He took into account NBA championships, regular season and playoff statistics, as well as longevity and flair. Simmons chose Tom Chambers as the first player in his new Pyramid (96th out of 96) because he saw Chambers as the "Was Player A better than...?" example for power forwards, and wanted to establish that baseline to underline the multi-tiered structure of his reimagined, moved-to-Indiana Hall of Fame.

While the book's Hall of Fame-related sections comprise about half the pages used (from 263 to 627, spanning chapters six through 11, in the paperback), the book leads into this by covering several key matters in NBA history. These involve Simmons' recounting of his father (Bill Sr.) purchasing a season ticket for only $4 a game as the Celtics rose and fell and rose (and critically rose when Larry Bird arrived in Boston); a meeting with Simmons' non-fan Isiah Thomas that turned into a surprisingly friendly discussion about "The Secret of basketball"; an overview of how Bill Russell was the greatest center of all-time (and NOT Wilt Chamberlain); a history of how the NBA evolved between 1949 and 1984 into what it is today; dozens of what-if scenarios for the NBA (including "What if the Detroit Pistons had drafted Carmelo Anthony instead of Darko Milicic in 2003?" and "What if the 1984 NBA Draft had unfolded differently?"); and a breakdown of past Most Valuable Player awards that were divided into completely deserving winners (all five trophies won by Michael Jordan), winners who were questionable but ultimately all right (such as Bill Walton's win in 1978) and winners who were travesties of justice (Jordan losing out to Charles Barkley in 1993 and Karl Malone in 1997). Stories are included of "The first time I witnessed this player live" moments that Bill recounts from his childhood, as well as anecdotes from his professional career in sports writing.

In 2010, Simmons released an updated paperback version of the book, cutting 30 pages from the original, fixing factual errors, adding new material, including fixing footnotes, updating his Hall of Fame Pyramid, and including a virtual guide. This updated version was released on December 7, 2010.

== Synopsis ==
From The Wall Street Journal:

"In what passes for structure, Mr. Simmons offers a brief (for him) history of the league. Then he "corrects" every mistaken MVP award the NBA ever handed out. Then he imagines every detail of a new and improved Basketball Hall of Fame, naming the 96 players who belong there and offering an analysis of each selection. Then he ranks the top 20 teams of all time. Finally, he conjures up the perfect 12-man roster to face a team of Martians with the fate of Earth on the line—with the 1985 version of Magic Johnson passing to a 1992 vintage of Mr. Jordan and the 2003 Tim Duncan rebounding."

== Reception ==
The Book of Basketball debuted at #1 on the New York Times bestseller list and spent 6 weeks in the top 15. It was named to Amazon's "Best Books of the Month" for October 2009. The Book of Basketball has been profiled in The Wall Street Journal, Deadspin, Dallas Morning News, The New York Times and The Washington Post.

Reviews for The Book of Basketball have been mostly positive, although it has been criticized for its length and editing. The Wall Street Journal notes that "Mr. Simmons may not resolve every long-standing hoops debate—who could?—but he compensates with plenty of detail and humor. And he has produced enough provocative arguments to fuel barstool arguments far into the future."

Several writers in New York's Vulture Blog objected to sexism in the book. Tommy Craggs found Simmons' sexism "astounding", citing Simmons' quote: "Every time I watch Jason Kidd play, initially it's like seeing a girl walk into a bar who's just drop-dead gorgeous, but then when he throws up one of those bricks, it's like the gorgeous girl taking off her jacket and you see she has tiny mosquito bites for tits." Ben Mathis-Lilley found Simmons' sexism "intrusively abhorrent", stating that "I actually stopped bothering to copy down the most egregious comments and figured I'd just note when Simmons mentioned a woman for any reason other than evaluating her appeal as something to put a penis in. I'm open to correction on this, but I believe it was when he praised Meryl Streep's acting somewhere around page 500."

== Book of Basketball 2.0 ==
On October 30, 2019, Simmons announced the sequel, "Book of Basketball 2.0", as a podcast which would consist of interviews with players, coaches, and top media members to determine how the league has evolved and where it’s headed.
