= Crime Junkie =

True crime podcast

- Genre: True crime
- Language: English

Cast and voices
- Hosted by: Ashley Flowers; Brit Prawat

Publication
- Original release: December 17, 2017
- Provider: Audiochuck
- Updates: Weekly

Related
- Website: crimejunkiepodcast.com

Crime Junkie is a true crime podcast hosted by Ashley Flowers and Brit Prawat, based in Indianapolis, Indiana.

== Production and format ==
In a Q&A with Inside Radio, Flowers said that she and Prawat, her co-host, have been friends since birth. Flowers and Prawat, born on the same day, became friends through their mothers and grew up together; both became interested in true crime.

After joining the board of directors for Crime Stoppers of Central Indiana, Flowers hosted Murder Monday, a 20-minute show on RadioNOW 100.9 in Indianapolis. The show lasted a year, and was intended as promotion for Crime Stoppers to "improve the organization’s standing with a younger audience." According to Flowers on WTHR, the name Crime Junkie came to her when she started working at Crime Stoppers. She felt that there weren't enough podcasts and decided to create one that she herself would enjoy.

Flowers released the first episode of Crime Junkie in December 2017 and has posted weekly episodes since then. Flowers worked full-time at a hospital while still managing Crime Junkie, but in 2019 reported that she had made managing Crime Junkie her full-time job.

Flowers says that each episode takes roughly 30 hours per week to research, write, edit, and prepare for release. Flowers does all of the research with the exception of a few episodes which Prawat has led.

Crime Junkie episodes typically are about 30 minutes to an hour long. The cases covered include murder, missing persons, and serial killers. Flowers tells the story while Prawat adds her perspective. There is an extra segment once a month called "Pruppet of the Month" where Prawat tells stories about dogs who have been adopted. This segment is unrelated to the typical Crime Junkie content and inspired by fans who posted pictures of their dogs online.

Flowers records the podcasts in her home office, and her brother, David Flowers, helps with the editing. The name AudioChuck came from Flowers' dog, Charlie, who howls at the end of every episode.

Flowers and Prawat have taken Crime Junkie on tour to four cities in the United States.

== Plagiarism concerns ==
In August 2019, multiple parties accused Flowers of plagiarism, the first of whom was writer and former reporter Cathy Frye. In a post made on the podcast's Facebook group, Frye alleged that the March 2019 episode about Kacie Woody relied heavily on her 2003 series of articles in the Arkansas Democrat-Gazette without attribution. Flowers initially removed the episode after the allegations, per Frye's request. However, she later reposted it with source notes that linked to Frye's work but did not give verbal attribution in the episode. Following this reposting, Frye and the Arkansas Democrat-Gazette sent a cease and desist letter to the podcast, claiming further legal action would be taken if the episode was not updated to include verbal attribution or once again removed entirely.

Once Frye accused Crime Junkie of stealing her content, it prompted other podcast makers to come forward with accusations of their own. Steven Pacheco of Trace Evidence posted a side-by-side comparison of the content of his episode on the disappearance of Asha Degree with that of Crime Junkie's, claiming his writing was used without credit. Robin Warder of The Trail Went Cold Podcast alleged the May 2018 episode on Henry McCabe "practically read... verbatim without credit" from his Reddit post. A Reddit user alleged that the March 2019 podcast on Kirsten Hatfield copied almost "word for word" from a 2018 episode of On the Case with Paula Zahn. Crime Junkie removed the episodes about Woody and Hatfield in August 2019, along with three other episodes.

Flowers issued a statement that episodes had been taken down because "source material could no longer be found or properly cited" and did not directly address the accusations of violating ethics of journalism, saying, "Our work would not be possible absent the incredible efforts of countless individuals who investigate and report these stories originally, and they deserve to be credited as such. We are committed to working within the burgeoning podcast industry to develop and evolve its standards on these kinds of issues.” The Arkansas Democrat-Gazette noted that the plagiarism controversy may have decreased Crime Junkie's audience, as it dropped from #1 to #5 in the Apple's true crime podcasts in August 2019. The Crime Junkie plagiarism controversy was named one of the top five plagiarism and attribution cases of 2019 by media news website iMediaEthics.

== Reception ==
Laura Barcella of Rolling Stone magazine named Crime Junkie among her favorite true crime podcasts for 2018. Jenni Miller of Vulture.com wrote that Flowers was "particularly passionate" in her coverage of the murder of April Tinsley with interviews with Tinsley's mother in a previous podcast and an interview with one of the people responsible for the arrest of the killer. In March 2019, USA Today's For The Win ran the 2019 Ultimate Podcast Bracket tournament in which Crime Junkie lost to Binge Mode in the Championship from a field of 32 podcasts. Kevin Chang Barnum from Podcast Review wrote a positive review and spoke highly of the research; the review was updated with a note after plagiarism allegations came to light.

In its release of the list of the 10-most streamed female artists on International Women’s Day in 2020, Spotify noted that Flowers’ and Prawat’s Crime Junkie was the second-most popular female-hosted podcast on its platform.

In 2022, Crime Junkie was nominated for the “Podcast of the Year” and "Best Crime Podcast" awards in the iHeartRadio Podcast Awards. In November 2024, Apple announced that the podcast was the No.2 most popular show on its platform in 2024.
