= Molly Lambert =

American journalist

- Born: Los Angeles, California
- Education: Brown University
- Occupations: Journalist; critic; podcaster
- Known for: Night Call, HeidiWorld

Molly Lambert is an American journalist, podcaster and social activist. She was born in Los Angeles and grew up in the San Fernando Valley.

== Career ==
From 2010 to 2012, Lambert wrote music reviews for Pitchfork. In 2014, she co-hosted the ESPN Grantland production Girls in Hoodies in which she discussed pop culture with Emily Yoshida and Tess Lynch. Lambert also co-hosted the MTV Entertainment Group podcast North Mollywood with journalist Alex Pappademas in 2017.

In 2016, she wrote an article for The New York Times about glass bricks - a subject she has discussed extensively, including on the podcast Why Do You Know That?.

Lambert reunited with Yoshida and Lynch in 2018 to host the iHeartRadio call-in show Night Call, which ran until 2020. Since February 2020 she has also hosted Deckheads with Anna Hossnieh, a former podcast and now Twitch stream centred on the reality show Below Deck and other Bravo programming. Lambert also wrote the foreword for I Used to Be Charming, a 2019 collection of the work of Eve Babitz. It was later published independently in The Paris Review.

In 2022, she wrote, produced and hosted HeidiWorld: The Heidi Fleiss Story, a limited series podcast about the life of Hollywood madam Heidi Fleiss. The show featured an extensive voice cast playing various characters from Fleiss' life, including Rian Johnson, Karina Longworth, Paul F. Tompkins and Karen Tongson.

In 2025, Lambert published Double Acts in Pop, a book about duos in pop music. The book is a collaboration with Commercial Type and features their entire library of fonts.

Lambert's latest podcast project is JennaWorld, about "the history of pornography and the San Fernando Valley and the last quarter century in media" centered on the life of Jenna Jameson. It was first announced by Lambert on her Instagram in 2023. The podcast premiered on October 27, 2025.

== Activism ==
Lambert is a member of the Los Angeles branch of the Democratic Socialists of America. She is also one of the founders of NOlympics LA, a movement which opposes the Olympic Games and seeks to cancel the 2028 Olympics in Los Angeles. She views the Olympics as "a scheme routinely carried out by a consortium of grotesquely wealthy oligarchs and war criminals (like Henry Kissinger), who use sports as a pretext to extract capital from poor communities around the world."

== Personal life ==
Lambert has family connections to the music industry. She is the sister of Ben "Lambo" Lambert, an executive and manager for Freddie Gibbs, and the daughter and niece, respectively, of Grateful Dead associates Glenn and Gary Lambert. Lambert is the granddaughter of German Jewish track and field athlete Gretel Bergmann. She majored in art semiotics at Brown University.
