= The B.S. Report =

ESPN podcast

- Genre: Sports
- Country of origin: United States
- Language: English

Cast and voices
- Hosted by: Bill Simmons

Production
- Length: 60–80 minutes

Technical specifications
- Audio format: MP3

Publication
- Original release: May 8, 2007; 18 years ago
- Provider: ESPN.com

The B.S. Report was an ESPN sports podcast hosted by Bill Simmons. It featured interviews with athletes, sports commentators, pop-culture experts, and friends of Simmons. The B.S. Report had no fixed publication schedule, though generally, 2–3 episodes were released each week. In 2009, it was ESPN's most-downloaded podcast, with over ten million downloads through June.

Occasionally, Simmons hosted notable guests from the sports world, such as NBA commissioner David Stern, or NBPA head Billy Hunter.

The A.V. Club named The B.S. Report one of the best podcasts of 2010.

== Format ==
The B.S. Report opened with a theme song written and performed by Ronald Jenkees and a voice-over announcement that the podcast "is a free-flowing conversation that occasionally touches on mature subjects".
