= Night Call (podcast) =

American podcast

- Genre: call-in show; strange days; lonely nights; dystopian reality
- Language: English

Cast and voices
- Hosted by: Molly Lambert, Tess Lynch, Emily Yoshida

Production
- Length: Variable (~60 minutes)

Technical specifications
- Audio format: Podcast

Publication
- No. of episodes: 136
- Original release: February 5, 2018 – December 7, 2020
- Updates: no

Related
- Website: podcasts.apple.com/us/podcast/night-call/id1342254154

Night Call was a weekly call-in show hosted by Molly Lambert, Tess Lynch, and Emily Yoshida. In addition to free weekly podcasts on the iHeartRadio platform, Night Call hosted live shows on Twitch.tv and in person, and created book club themed episodes, movie club themed episodes, and monthly mixes for their Patreon supporters.

== Previous collaborations ==
The three first worked together on the Girls in Hoodies podcast at Grantland through 2014, a podcast that "dared to challenge its listeners".

== Reception ==
Night Call held a 4.5-star rating on Apple Podcasts and received positive reviews from outlets such as The Maine Campus, TIME, Pacific Standard, Vulture.com, and ELLE.
