= Juliet Litman =

Journalist, editor, and American media personality

- Born: Juliet Elinor Litman; February 18, 1986 (age 40); New York, New York, United States
- Education: Northwestern University, BA 2008
- Occupations: Journalist, Editor, Podcast host
- Children: 1
- Writing career
- Language: English

Juliet Elinor Litman is an American journalist, editor, and American media personality. As of 2017, she is the Head of Production at The Ringer, Bill Simmons' latest online enterprise. Litman is the former host of the Right Reasons and NBA After Dark podcasts and was also formerly the Special Projects Editor at Grantland.

Litman grew up on the Upper West Side of Manhattan and graduated from The Bronx High School of Science before attending Northwestern University. She was born in New York City, New York.

== Career ==
=== Grantland ===
In 2014, Litman was hired by the Bill Simmons Podcast Network, part of HBO and Grantland. There, she hosted NBA After Dark and a regular podcast called Sources Say with Chris Ryan, which discussed NBA pop culture.

Litman also co-hosted Grantland's Right Reasons Podcast with journalist and media personality David Jacoby. It was widely regarded as a top reality television podcast. The podcast covered reality television, popular culture, and added a divisive taste testing segment in May 2014. Litman has conducted many notable celebrity interviews.

=== The Ringer ===
Since early 2016, Litman has worked as the managing editor at The Ringer for longtime boss Bill Simmons. She is also the host of the Bachelor Party podcast and co-host of the Jam Session podcast with Amanda Dobbins. The former podcast features as a discussion of both The Bachelor and The Bachelorette TV shows and features frequent interviews with producers, cast, and former contestants on the TV show franchise. On April 26, 2018, it was announced that Litman had been promoted to Head of Production of all Ringer content.

In 2019, Litman co-hosted the Hulu original show Can I Steal You For a Second.

== Podcasts ==
Litman hosts or is a part of a number of podcasts part of the Spotify-owned Ringer Podcast Network. Her current podcasts include:

- Bachelor Party
- Jam Session
- The Rewatchables
- Ringer Food
- TV Concierge

== See also ==
- Bill Simmons
- Andy Greenwald
- Rembert Browne
