= After the Thrones =

American live television aftershow

- Genre: Aftershow
- Presented by: Andy Greenwald; Chris Ryan
- Composer: Ramin Djawadi
- Country of origin: United States
- Original language: English
- No. of seasons: 1
- No. of episodes: 10

Production
- Executive producers: Bill Simmons; Eric Weinberger
- Producers: Chris Ryan; Andy Greenwald
- Running time: 30–35 minutes
- Production companies: The Ringer; HBO

Original release
- Network: HBO
- Release: April 25 – June 28, 2016

Related
- Game of Thrones

After the Thrones is an American live television aftershow that premiered on April 25, 2016, and ended on June 28, 2016. It was hosted by Andy Greenwald and Chris Ryan who discussed episodes of the HBO television series Game of Thrones. The talk show was executive produced by Bill Simmons and Eric Weinberger. Greenwald and Ryan previously hosted a podcast version of the show titled Watch the Thrones on Simmons' Grantland website. A similar talk show called Thronecast aired on British channel Sky Atlantic, which also discussed episodes of Game of Thrones.

The talk show was made available to HBO and HBO Now subscribers, and airs on the Monday following each episode of Game of Thrones. After the show's cancellation, Greenwald and Ryan, along with Simmons, made a similar live stream video podcast for distribution on Twitter called Talk the Thrones. Although it covers the same subject matter, it is a different production.

== Broadcast and format ==
The series features hosts Andy Greenwald and Chris Ryan from the upcoming sports and pop culture website, The Ringer created by Bill Simmons, discussing episodes of the HBO fantasy drama Game of Thrones. Following the success of similar shows such as Talking Dead, which serves as a network sanctioned discussion of the show, HBO decided to introduce its own version of the format in which the hosts provide a "lively, humorous and sophisticated look" at the previous night's episode. The show airs on the stand-alone streaming service HBO Now on the Monday following each episode of the show's sixth season, which itself airs on Sundays. Greenwald and Ryan previously hosted a similar version of the show for Simmons' now-defunct sports and pop culture website Grantland, titled "Watch the Thrones", in a podcast format. Previous "Watch the Thrones" guests Mallory Rubin and Jason Concepcion are also part of the show.

The series began on Monday, April 25, 2016, on HBO Now, HBO Go, HBO On Demand and HBO. The stated purpose of the show is to "recap the latest episode, explaining the who, what, when and where, exploring the complicated politics and history of Thrones, and offering absurd and not-so-absurd theories about future episodes."

For the seventh season of Game of Thrones, the after show changed its name to Talk the Thrones and moved from HBO to the social media site Twitter, where it streamed live every week after an episode aired. Simmons said that "We love Game of Thrones and we love the way Twitter is thinking about content right now, so we jumped at the chance to blow out our Thrones show into an interactive multimedia experience — something that reacts immediately to what just happened, almost like a postgame show in sports - Nobody is equipped to do that better than Twitter. It's the natural evolution of what we had already established with Chris, Andy, Mallory and Jason."

== Episodes ==
These episodes discuss season six of Game of Thrones. Starting from the first episode, "The Red Woman".

| No. | Episode | Original release date | Viewers (millions) |
|---|---|---|---|
| 1 | "The Red Woman" | April 25, 2016 | 0.165 |
| 2 | "Home" | May 3, 2016 | 0.167 |
| 3 | "Oathbreaker" | May 10, 2016 | 0.222 |
| 4 | "Book of the Stranger" | May 17, 2016 | 0.146 |
| 5 | "The Door" | May 24, 2016 | 0.240 |
| 6 | "Blood of My Blood" | May 31, 2016 | 0.229 |
| 7 | "The Broken Man" | June 7, 2016 | N/A |
| 8 | "No One" | June 14, 2016 | N/A |
| 9 | "Battle of the Bastards" | June 21, 2016 | N/A |
| 10 | "The Winds of Winter" | June 28, 2016 | 0.363 |

== See also ==
- List of Game of Thrones episodes
