= Emily Yoshida =

American screenwriter

- Education: University of California, Los Angeles
- Occupations: Writer; director; podcaster
- Known for: Night Call, Shogun

Emily Yoshida is a writer and director. Her first television show was Shogun, for which she and the rest of the writing staff won the Writers Guild Awards for Drama Series and New Series in 2025. She also directed the music video for Speedy Ortiz's song Lucky 88, and wrote and directed a short film starring Mitski. She was previously a writer for Vulture and New York magazine, and was published in The New York Times and Slate. As influences, she has cited Wong Kar-wai, Alfonso Cuarón, and Star Trek: The Next Generation.

In addition to writing and directing, Yoshida co-hosted the podcasts Night Call and Grantland's Girls in Hoodies, and had a cameo acting appearance as a podcaster on the television series Poker Face. She is a supervising producer on the forthcoming Netflix series Kennedy.

== Filmography ==
Film

Year	Title	Writer	Director
2017	SITTING	Yes	Yes
2018	Lucky 88	No	Yes

Television

Year	Title	Writer	Director
2024	Shogun	Yes	No

== Awards and nominations ==
Year	Association	Category	Work	Result	Ref.
2025	Writers Guild of America Awards	Drama Series	Shogun	Won	
2025	Writers Guild of America Awards	New Series	Shogun	Won	
