= Yacht Rock: A Dockumentary =

2024 documentary film by Garret Price

- Directed by: Garret Price
- Produced by: Garret Price; Adam Gibbs; Madison Cross
- Starring: Michael McDonald; Kenny Loggins; Christopher Cross; Questlove; Fred Armisen
- Cinematography: Andre Lescaris
- Edited by: Avner Shiloah; Garret Price
- Production companies: HBO Documentary Films; Ringer Films; Margot Station
- Distributed by: HBO
- Release dates: November 13, 2024 (Doc NYC); November 29, 2024 (HBO)
- Running time: 96 minutes
- Country: United States
- Language: English

Yacht Rock: A Dockumentary is a 2024 American documentary film directed by Garret Price. Released by HBO as Music Box: Yacht Rock: A DOCKumentary, it is part of the Music Box documentary film series and examines yacht rock, a label popularized by a 2005 web series for late-1970s and early-1980s West Coast soft rock.

The film features interviews with musicians associated with the genre, contemporary musicians and critics, and the creators of the web series that gave the genre its name. It had its world premiere at Doc NYC on November 13, 2024, before its HBO and Max debut on November 29. The film received generally favorable reviews and was nominated for sound mixing awards from the Television Academy and the Cinema Audio Society.

== Production and content ==
Price directed and produced the documentary, with Adam Gibbs and Madison Cross also producing. Jody Gerson, Marc Cimino, and Bill Simmons served as executive producers, with Geoff Chow and Sean Fennessey as co-executive producers. Doc NYC listed Andre Lescaris as cinematographer and Avner Shiloah and Price as editors, and identifies the film as a 96-minute world premiere selection in its Sonic Cinema program. Price had previously directed Woodstock 99: Peace, Love, and Rage and Love, Antosha.

Yacht Rock: A Dockumentary covers the music associated with Steely Dan, Michael McDonald, Kenny Loggins, Christopher Cross, Toto, and the Doobie Brothers. The film treats the term "yacht rock" as a retroactive label that came from a 2005 online comedy series by J. D. Ryznar and Steve Huey, rather than as a term used by the musicians when the songs were originally released. The film's interviewees discuss the genre's relationship to soft rock, jazz, rhythm and blues, studio musicianship, and the boundaries between yacht rock and other soft rock acts.

Interviewees include Cross, McDonald, Loggins, Toto members David Paich and Steve Porcaro, David Pack of Ambrosia, Questlove, Thundercat, Prince Paul, Mac DeMarco, Brian Robert Jones, Brenda Russell, Fred Armisen, music journalists, critics, session players, Ryznar, and Huey. Donald Fagen of Steely Dan declined Price's interview request, but the film uses Steely Dan music after Fagen's manager allowed six songs to be licensed.

== Release ==
Yacht Rock: A Dockumentary premiered at Doc NYC on November 13, 2024. HBO released the trailer the same day, and said that the film would be released on November 29 as part of the Music Box series. The film debuted on HBO and became available to stream on Max on November 29, 2024. Doc NYC lists the runtime as 96 minutes.

== Reception ==
=== Critical response ===
On Rotten Tomatoes, Yacht Rock: A Dockumentary has a 91 percent Tomatometer rating based on 11 critic reviews. Metacritic assigned the film a weighted average score of 78 out of 100 based on 5 critic reviews, indicating "generally favorable" reviews.

Johnny Loftus of Decider recommended the film for streaming, writing that it uses interviews with musicians, critics, and the creators of the Yacht Rock web series to examine both the genre's ironic reception and the musical craft behind it. Mark Kennedy of the Associated Press described the documentary as "well-crafted" and emphasized Price's stated aim to make a film that was humorous without mocking the musicians.

=== Accolades ===
Year	Award	Category	Nominee(s)	Result	Ref.
2025	Primetime Emmy Awards	Outstanding Sound Mixing for a Nonfiction Program	Tony Solis, Paul Stula, and Barry London	Nominated	
2025	Cinema Audio Society Awards	Television Non-Fiction, Variety or Music - Series or Specials	Paul Stula, Barry London, Tony Solis, and Maverick Yadao	Nominated	
