= Crimestoppers UK =

British charitable organization

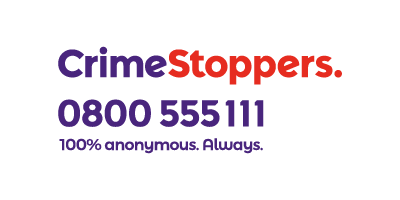
Crimestoppers logo including the service phone number and anonymity guarantee.

Crimestoppers UK, also known as the Crimestoppers Trust, is a charity independent of the police in the United Kingdom. Inspired by the American organization of the same name, it operates an anonymous online form and phone service tip line.

The service is available 24 hours a day, all year round, with all information received sanitised to protect the anonymity of the service users before being disseminated to the relevant authorities. Crimestoppers works with commercial and third-sector partners to share advice on keeping safe for individuals and communities.

== History ==
Crime Stoppers was founded in 1976 in Albuquerque, New Mexico, United States. Six years later, Detective Inspector Mike Cole of Norfolk Constabulary learnt about the scheme on a police visit to Peoria, Illinois. Impressed with Crime Stoppers, Cole presented a report to his supervisors, who gave their approval for a Norfolk scheme. Jim Carter, the manager of the local Woolworths, subsequently received a letter from Chief Superintendent Peter Howse asking for support. Carter became a co-founder.

During the 1985 London riots, Keith Blakelock was murdered at the Broadwater Farm Estate in London and the police appealed for information, stating that people knew who had been responsible but were frightened of coming forward. This led to the founding of the Community Action Trust (CAT) by Michael Ashcroft and his business colleagues in 1988. The CAT was a phone line where people called and anonymously provided information about crime, which was then forwarded to the police.

The CAT was renamed Crimestoppers Trust in 1995; by then it had expanded to cover the whole of the UK.

Since Crimestoppers began in 1988, it reports that it has received more than 2.2 million actionable calls, resulting in more than 151,000 arrests and charges, more than £139 million worth of stolen goods recovered and more than £367 million worth of illegal drugs seized.

== Operations ==
Crimestoppers offers cash rewards to encourage people to come forward with information. The exact amount is determined on a case-by-case basis, and depends on the information provided and the resulting positive impact.

Crimestoppers’ Most Wanted is a UK-wide gallery with images of individuals wanted by law enforcement. Crimestoppers’ Most Wanted has been running since 2005 and is updated by the individual police forces. Crimestoppers states that Most Wanted has resulted in more than 5,000 arrests.

Fearless, Crimestoppers’ youth service, was established to provide young people aged 11–17 years the opportunity to give information about crime. Fearless has its own dedicated website and separate social media channels.

Crimestoppers runs national campaigns throughout the year focusing on crime priorities such as violence against women and girls, drink and drug driving and knife crime. These campaigns raise awareness of the crime types, highlight the signs to spot and encourage the public to give information anonymously.

== Television and radio appeals ==
Titlecard used for the televised appeals

In 1988, Crimestoppers started to broadcast appeals on ITV, initially covering four of the regions: HTV, Yorkshire, Tyne Tees and Thames Television/LWT. These short appeals, roughly one minute long, were similar in format to the long-running series Police 5 and would feature a brief reconstruction or CCTV footage of a variety of crimes committed in the region and an E-FIT of the suspect alongside an appeal for anybody with information to contact the charity by telephone. They were often broadcast at various times of the day as one of many local opt-out or filler segments aired during commercial breaks or within a free low-profile time slot dedicated to promoting regional charities, groups and services, community messages and public service announcements. These were widely discontinued in the early 2000s.

In the majority of these regions, the opening sequence would feature a moving mouth montage on a grey background with the words 'Crime' (in white) and 'Stoppers' (in red) accompanied by a synthesized theme composed by Rupert Gregson-Williams which opened the appeal, often narrated by a local ITV employee or a member of the police before showing the 0800 555 111 appeal telephone number at its conclusion. The appeals scared younger children who were frightened by the graphics and music, so were later toned down in some regions. Some regions, such as Tyne Tees, TSW/Westcountry and Yorkshire, opted to use their own locally-produced titles and different theme music. Meridian would broadcast them during their long-running filler programme, Three Minutes.

In 1996, Darlows estate agents began to sponsor appeals in the HTV Wales region. By 2002, the appeals aired had become fewer in some regions and were discontinued in April of that year, however, they continued to be aired on ITV Wales until at least 2013. The charity later helped produce the ITV programme Manhunt – Solving Britain's Crimes, which aired for two episodes in December 2006 and May 2007.

Real Radio also used to run a two-minute Crimestoppers announcement at 11:00 on weekdays in the South Wales area.

== Structure ==
Crimestoppers has National and Regional Managers across the UK who liaise with local police force. There are 100 staff at Crimestoppers, along with over 300 volunteers UK-wide, led by local county-based Volunteer Committees.

The chair of Crimestoppers is its founder, Michael Ashcroft. Crimestoppers is governed by a board of trustees who carry the responsibility of company directors. Crimestoppers’ chief executive officer is Mark Hallas.

== Funding ==
Crimestoppers’ income is generated by national and local government grants, public sector funding, trusts and foundations and the public through donations and fundraising. Crimestoppers also has corporate partners who fund a range of services.
