= Now I Can Die in Peace =

2006 book by Bill Simmons

Now I Can Die in Peace: How ESPN's Sports Guy Found Salvation, With a Little Help From Nomar, Pedro, Shawshank and the 2004 Red Sox
- Author: Bill Simmons
- Language: English
- Genre: Sports anthology
- Publisher: ESPN Books
- Publication date: 2006
- Publication place: United States
- Media type: Print
- Pages: 384 pp (paperback)
- ISBN: 978-1-933060-13-2

Now I Can Die in Peace: How ESPN's Sports Guy Found Salvation, With a Little Help From Nomar, Pedro, Shawshank and the 2004 Red Sox is a 2006 sports anthology of original columns written by ESPN sports writer Bill Simmons. Simmons, a passionate Boston Red Sox fan, chronicles the team's 2004 season and 2004 World Series win.

== Reviews ==
Booklist starred its review and said Simmons' tone was a "refreshing, funny take on Boston's reversal of fortune."

== Summary ==
Now I Can Die in Peace is a collection of Simmons' articles from 1999 to 2004. It chronicles events such as Pedro Martínez's 1999 Cy Young season, the loss to the New York Yankees in the 2003 ALCS, and the 2004 ALCS, when the Red Sox won the last 4 games after they lost the first three games of the series. It contains frequent pop culture references and comparisons to The Shawshank Redemption. One interesting article Simmons included in the book is not about baseball at all; it's his famous "Silence of the Rams" column that was written after the New England Patriots defeated the St. Louis Rams to win Super Bowl XXXVI, which he watched live at the Superdome in New Orleans. It had been that column that Simmons entitled Now I Can Die in Peace before republishing it as Silence of the Rams in the book. Simmons wrote that if the "Fredo of the Boston sports scene" could win a championship, then it was possible for the Red Sox to someday end their then-84-year-long title drought.

Re-releases included subsequent columns such as the Red Sox's next World Series win in 2007 against the Colorado Rockies.
