= Kirk Goldsberry =

American sports analyst

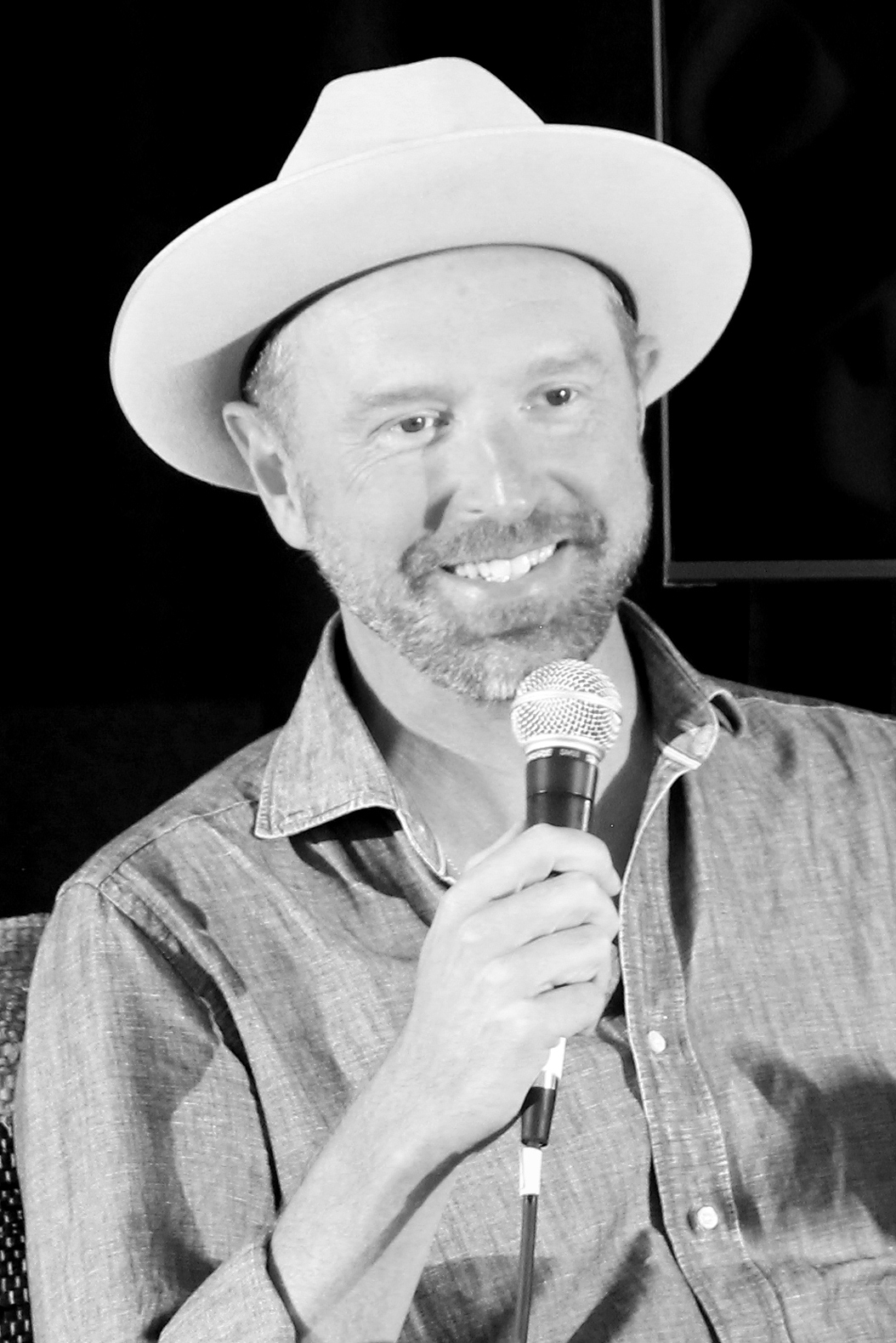
Goldsberry in 2022

Kirk Goldsberry (born 1977) is a basketball writer. He was the vice president for strategic research for the San Antonio Spurs, the lead analyst for Team USA Basketball, and a visiting researcher at the Harvard Institute of Quantitative Social Science. He is best known for his sports writing and for his application of spatial analytics to shooting data in the NBA, and the use of this analysis to map shooting location, frequency, and success in basketball analytics, and for being a member of the advanced metrics movement in basketball.

== Education ==
Goldsberry earned a PhD (2007) from UC-Santa Barbara where he studied Cartography and data visualization. He also holds a master's degree from UCSB, and a bachelor's degree from Penn State (1999), where he majored in Earth Science and Geography. He played basketball recreationally.

== Career ==
=== Academia ===
Following graduate school, Goldsberry served as an assistant professor of geography at Michigan State (2007–2013) and a visiting professor at Harvard (2011–2013). At Harvard, Goldsberry designed and co-taught the first Geography course offered in the undergraduate General Education curriculum since Harvard eliminated Geography in the 1940s. In 2012, Goldsberry presented a paper at the MIT Sloan Sports Analytics Conference entitled CourtVision: New Visual and Spatial Analytics for the NBA. Within the paper, Goldsberry introduced a new method for making shot charts using NBA shooting data, and suggested that the amount of areas from which a player successfully attempts field goals, or Range%, could contribute to the analysis of a given player's shooting ability.

He currently teaches Sports Analytics within the McCombs School of Business at the University of Texas at Austin.

=== ESPN and Grantland ===
During his time at ESPN and Grantland (2012–2015), Goldsberry achieved prominence by integrating his shot charts with analytical breakdowns of NBA players. His work appeared regularly at Grantland, FiveThirtyEight, and other ESPN outlets. Among his most cited pieces are The Kobe Assist, The Evolution of King James, and DataBall.

Goldsberry leveraged his background as a cartographer to analyze and present spatial basketball data to readers in novel ways. He used his personal experience playing basketball, where his strengths and weaknesses varied depending on his location on the court, and figured that it also applied to other players.

=== San Antonio Spurs ===
After Grantland was shut down, Goldsberry joined the San Antonio Spurs as their vice president for strategic research in 2016. He left in 2018 to return to writing.

=== Return to writing ===
In 2019, Goldsberry published SprawlBall: A Visual Tour of the New Era of the NBA, which focuses on the inefficiency of shots in basketball taken between the restricted circle and the three-point line.

== Publications ==
- Goldsberry, Kirk (2019). SprawlBall: A Visual Tour of the New Era of the NBA. Houghton Mifflin Harcourt. ISBN 978-1328767516.
