= Hard to Handle: The Life and Death of the Black Crowes =

2019 memoir by Steve Gorman

Hard to Handle: The Life and Death of The Black Crowes
- First edition
- Author: Steve Gorman, Steven Hyden
- Language: English
- Genre: Memoir
- Publisher: Da Capo Press
- Publication date: September 24, 2019
- Publication place: USA
- Pages: 368
- ISBN: 9780306922015

Hard to Handle: The Life and Death of the Black Crowes is a memoir by drummer Steve Gorman about his time in The Black Crowes, co-written by music critic Steven Hyden. The book describes the formation and success of the Black Crowes from Gorman's point of view as well as its eventual break-up.

== Background ==
The book covers Gorman's time performing in bands with the Robinson brothers, from 1987 to 2013. Pete Angelus' management and promotion of the Crowes is a major part of the focus of the memoir, as is the rivalry between brothers Chris Robinson and Rich Robinson. The book primarily deals with the history of the band, and Gorman's explanation as to why it eventually fell apart.

Gorman co-wrote the book with Steven Hyden, and it was published by Da Capo Press.

== Reception ==
The book was positively received by critics. The Black Crowes were reformed a month after release of the book, which gave it added publicity.
