= Crime Stoppers International =

International non-profit crime reporting organisation

Crime Stoppers International (CSI), also known as the Crime Stoppers International Foundation, is a non-profit umbrella organisation for Crime Stoppers programs worldwide. Crime Stoppers programs allow members of the public to report information about crime anonymously, typically in exchange for a cash reward where the information leads to an arrest. CSI supports a network of national and regional Crime Stoppers programs in more than 30 countries, operates a global platform for anonymous reporting of transnational crime, and works with international law enforcement bodies including Interpol.

== History ==
The Crime Stoppers concept originated in Albuquerque, New Mexico in 1976, when Detective Greg MacAleese, investigating the murder of petrol station attendant Michael Carmen, appealed to the public through a televised re-enactment and offered a reward and anonymity for information. The model spread through the United States, Canada, the United Kingdom, Australia and elsewhere, and Crime Stoppers International was established as the coordinating body for the programs.

CSI historically has been governed by a volunteer board, hosted an annual international training conference, and been funded by dues from member organisations. The 35th annual conference was held in Cape Town in 2014, the first in Africa; the 39th was held in The Hague in 2018, where Sharon Hanlon of Australia became the first woman elected president of the organisation.

In 2019 a Crime Stoppers program was launched in the Philippines at an anti-crime summit in Mandaluyong, with the backing of the Federation of Philippine Industries and the National Capital Region Police Office.

=== Aylo trust and safety review ===
In January 2024 CSI announced a working relationship with Aylo, the owner of Pornhub, and its private equity owner Ethical Capital Partners, following Aylo's deferred prosecution agreement with U.S. prosecutors over allegations relating to sex trafficking. Under the arrangement CSI was engaged to review Aylo's trust and safety policies and processes, which are intended to prevent child sexual abuse material and non-consensual imagery from appearing on its platforms, and to make recommendations for improvement. CSI said it regarded engagement with the adult industry as preferable to exclusion and that access to the company's internal processes offered a practical route to reducing harm.

The arrangement drew criticism within the Crime Stoppers network. In April 2024 Crime Stoppers Australia ended its membership of CSI, stating that the partnership was at odds with its charitable purpose, after South Australia Police suspended its relationship with the Australian body in protest; a CSI board member also resigned. CSI completed the review in 2025 and provided a report with recommendations to Aylo. It had initially indicated the report would be made public, but later said a confidentiality clause prevented its release.

== Cooperation with Interpol ==
CSI has supported Interpol's Operation Infra (International Fugitive Round-Up and Arrest) since the first global Infra-Red operation in 2009–2010, which targeted fugitives subject to Red Notices for offences including murder, child sexual abuse and drug trafficking. CSI staff were seconded to Interpol's General Secretariat in Lyon during the operations, and national Crime Stoppers programs served as an anonymous channel for public information on the targeted fugitives.

In November 2010 the 79th Interpol General Assembly in Doha approved a resolution formalising cooperation between the two organisations, and a cooperation agreement was signed by Interpol Secretary General Ronald Noble and CSI President Michael Gordon-Gibson. Interpol reported that the 2010 operation led to more than 130 fugitives being arrested or located in 32 countries. CSI continued to participate in subsequent regional Infra operations, including Infra-SA, Infra-SEA and Infra Americas, which Interpol stated had collectively produced more than 500 arrests and positive locations by 2013.

== Leadership and strategy ==
CSI is governed by an international volunteer board drawn from member organisations, with day-to-day operations led by a chief executive officer. Shane Britten served as CEO until 2025, when the board announced that Deputy CEO Hayley van Loon, who had held that role for two years, would succeed him.

Van Loon is an Australian former counter-terrorism case officer and intelligence professional who spent almost a decade in the United States advising corporations and institutions on security and insider risk before joining CSI. She is a member of the World Economic Forum's Coalition for Digital Safety and the Global Coalition to Fight Financial Crime.

Van Loon has received several Australian security and intelligence industry awards. In 2024 she was named Outstanding Female Security Professional at the Australian Outstanding Security Performance Awards (OSPAs), presented alongside the Australian Security Industry Awards for Excellence, and received the David Irvine AO Memorial Award from the Australian Institute of Professional Intelligence Officers (AIPIO), an annual award recognising an outstanding contribution to the intelligence profession in Australia. In 2025 she was named Most Outstanding in Protective Security at the Australian Women in Security Awards, and in 2026 she was included in the Security Industry Association's Women in Security Forum Power 100.

In 2026 CSI published a 2026–2029 strategic plan, No Light Between the Shields, with three stated priorities: strengthening anonymous reporting, expanding the organisation's reach through the Crime Stoppers network and partner organisations, and establishing a Global Intelligence Fusion Centre intended to convert community reports into de-identified intelligence for law enforcement. Van Loon has described the fusion centre as a response to crime that crosses borders and moves faster than the systems built to address it, arguing that individual anonymous tips need to be connected across jurisdictions to reveal trafficking and fraud networks.

== Cybercrime Bounty program ==
In November 2025 CSI and the cybersecurity company Fortinet announced a partnership and a Cybercrime Bounty program, under which members of the public can anonymously report information about the people behind cybercrime, with rewards offered for information that leads to arrests. Under the arrangement CSI provides the anonymous reporting infrastructure while Fortinet's threat intelligence team assesses tips and, where appropriate, refers packages to law enforcement. The program is distinct from a bug bounty program in that it targets the individuals committing cybercrime rather than software vulnerabilities.

In July 2026 CSI launched Operation Silent Vector, the first named action under the program, seeking information on the INC Ransomware ransomware-as-a-service group and its affiliates. Fortinet's Derek Manky described the program at Black Hat USA 2026 as an attempt to address attribution, which he characterised as the hardest problem in threat intelligence, by adding human-sourced information to technical indicators.

== National programs ==
=== Canada ===
In Canada, the Supreme Court of Canada ruled unanimously in R v Leipert, [1997] 1 S.C.R. 281, that police are not required to disclose information received through the Crime Stoppers program, holding that informer privilege is of fundamental importance to the criminal justice system and cannot be balanced against other interests once established.

=== Barbados ===
In 2009 Crime Stoppers Barbados reported that tips had resulted in 18 arrests, 34 charges and 23 cases cleared for the year, and was described by its chairman as the fastest-growing program in the international network at that time.

=== Guatemala ===
Crime Stoppers Guatemala operates under an agreement with the Ministry of the Interior and runs the anonymous tip website tupista.gt. With support from the U.S. Bureau of International Narcotics and Law Enforcement Affairs, it launched a call centre in late 2021, which received over 37,000 calls during 2022.

The president of Crime Stoppers in Guatemala is a member of a well known family of business owners in that country. In 2018, together with other business leaders, he admitted to illegally financing a political party. Charges were dropped after the investigating body was disbanded.

== See also ==
- Crime Stoppers
- Crime Stoppers USA
- Interpol notice
