= Any Given Wednesday with Bill Simmons =

Television series

- Created by: Bill Simmons
- Presented by: Bill Simmons
- Country of origin: United States
- Original language: English
- No. of seasons: 1
- No. of episodes: 17

Production
- Executive producers: Stuart Miller; Eric Weinberger; Kim Gamble
- Running time: 30 minutes

Original release
- Network: HBO
- Release: June 22 – November 9, 2016

Any Given Wednesday with Bill Simmons is an American talk show hosted by Bill Simmons. The series premiered on June 22, 2016, on HBO. On November 4, 2016, HBO announced it had canceled the series.

== Episodes ==
No.	Guest(s)	Original release date	US viewers (millions)
1	Ben Affleck, Charles Barkley	June 22, 2016	0.260
2	Bill Hader, Mark Cuban, Malcolm Gladwell	June 29, 2016	0.362
3	Joe Rogan, Chris Bosh, Anthony Anderson	July 6, 2016	0.276
4	Aaron Rodgers	July 13, 2016	0.191
5	Danny McBride, Christina Hendricks, Michael K. Williams	July 27, 2016	0.163
6	Caitlyn Jenner, JJ Redick, Lamorne Morris	August 3, 2016	0.247
7	Seth Rogen, Ricky Williams, Rembert Browne	August 10, 2016	0.220
8	Jonah Hill, Jon Favreau, Wesley Morris	August 17, 2016	0.204
9	Jay Glazer, DeMaurice Smith, Malcolm Gladwell	September 7, 2016	0.217
10	Joseph Gordon-Levitt, Cris Carter, Amy Trask	September 14, 2016	0.148
11	Kevin Durant, Nas, Vince Staples	September 21, 2016	0.159
12	Abby Wambach, Charlamagne Tha God	September 28, 2016	0.144
13	Doug Baldwin, Joel McHale, Michael Rapaport	October 5, 2016	0.267
14	Bob Costas, Al Michaels, Vince Staples	October 19, 2016	0.115
15	Wayne Gretzky, Bill Burr, Larry Wilmore	October 26, 2016	0.082
16	Jay Glazer, Paul Pierce	November 2, 2016	N/A
17	Jimmy Kimmel, Adam Carolla	November 9, 2016	0.167

== Reception ==
=== Ratings ===
According to Nielsen live-plus-same-day data, through its first fifteen weeks, Any Given Wednesday averaged 203,667 live viewers per episode. HBO announced that the show averaged a total of 2.4 million weekly views across all platforms during that same time period.

=== Critical ===
Any Given Wednesday was met with negative to mixed reviews. Review aggregation website Metacritic gives the show a 51 out of 100, indicating "mixed or average reviews". As of September 2016, it held a 50% rating on Rotten Tomatoes. Bill Simmons was quoted as saying "We loved making that show, but unfortunately it never resonated with audiences like we hoped. And that's on me."

=== Cancellation ===
On November 4, 2016, the series was canceled by HBO. The final episode aired on November 9, 2016. Bill Simmons also issued a statement regarding the cancellation acknowledging the failure of the series.
