= Crime Stoppers USA =

Umbrella organization in the United States

Crime Stoppers USA is the umbrella organization for Crime Stoppers programs in the United States. It is a non-profit, non-governmental, IRS 501(c)(3) tax-exempt charitable organization that advises its member programs and sets operational standards for Crime Stoppers organizations across the United States and its territories. Conferences are held each year to educate local program boards of issues affecting their programs. Crime Stoppers USA is not a legal or law enforcement organization; at this time it receives no government funding and is funded solely on dues, grants and donations.

== History ==
Crime Stoppers began in Albuquerque, New Mexico in July 1976, which saw the fatal shooting of Michael Carmen while he was working one night at a local filling station. After two weeks the police had no information about the murder. Out of desperation, Detective Greg MacAleese approached the local television station requesting a reconstruction of the crime. The re-enactment offered $1,000 for information leading to the arrest of the killers.

Within 72 hours, a person called in identifying a car leaving the scene at high speed and he had noted its registration. The person calling said that he did not want to get involved so he had not called earlier. Detective MacAleese then realized that fear and apathy were primary reasons that people were not sharing information about crimes. MacAleese helped design a system where the public could anonymously provide details of the events. It focused on stimulating community involvement and participation, taking advantage of every possible media opportunity, especially electronic media, to publicize unsolved crimes; and offering cash rewards for information leading to an arrest and/or conviction.

Since its first chapter was officially formed in Albuquerque in 1976, Crime Stoppers USA programs have been responsible for more than six hundred thousand arrests, more than $4 billion in recovered property and drugs and over one hundred million in rewards paid out.

On the 19th of March 2013 an agreement was signed forming the International Affiliation of Crime Stoppers between Crime Stoppers of the United States of America and Crime Stoppers of the United Kingdom. This organization will seek to spread Crime Stoppers into other nations while keeping the principle of anonymity.

Crime Stoppers has been repeatedly criticized for not paying out awards if the tipper does not call Crime Stoppers first. Even in life-threatening situations, callers are expected to call Crime Stoppers before calling 911. Crime Stoppers has also been accused of advertising awards without funding actually being available.
