= Crime Stoppers =

Program that allows people to anonymously report crimes

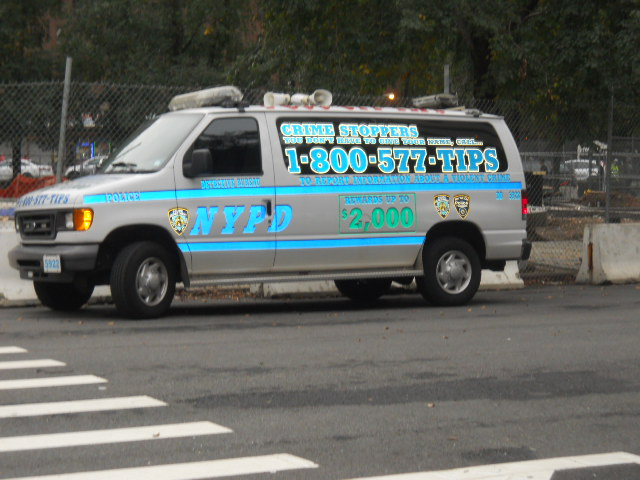
NYPD Crime Stoppers Van in September 2011

Crime Stoppers or Crimestoppers is a community program that assists people in providing anonymous information about criminal activity. Often managed by non-profit groups or the police, it operates separately from the emergency telephone number system or other standard methods of contacting police. This allows a person to provide crime-solving assistance to the authorities without being directly involved in the investigation process. Founded in the United States in 1976 in Albuquerque, New Mexico, Crime Stoppers later caught on in Australia, Canada, Ireland, and the United Kingdom.

The authorities, especially the police, occasionally rely on information from the community about criminal activities or events. Crime Stoppers was developed to enable the public to participate without fear of reprisal and to make it easier for witnesses to volunteer information anonymously. There have been challenges to this aspect.

== History ==
Crime Stoppers first began in Albuquerque, New Mexico in July 1976. That month, Michael Carmen was fatally shot whilst working the night shift at a local gas station. After two weeks, the police had not been able to gather any information about the murder. Detective Greg MacAleese approached the local television station to request they film a reconstruction of the crime. When the re-enactment was aired, the police department offered US$1,000.00 for any information that could potentially lead to the arrest of the perpetrator. Within 72 hours, a male called in identifying a car which he had seen leaving the scene at high speed; he had noted its registration. The person calling said that he did not want to get involved; therefore, he had not called earlier.

Detective MacAleese realized that fear and apathy often prevented the public from getting involved in investigations. He helped design a system by which the public could anonymously provide details of the events. This system focused on stimulating community involvement and participation, and took advantage of electronic media to publicize unsolved crimes. The police offered cash rewards for information leading to an arrest or conviction.

Since the first chapter was officially formed in Albuquerque in 1976, Crime Stoppers in the United States has been responsible for more than a million arrests and more than US$11 billion in recovered property.

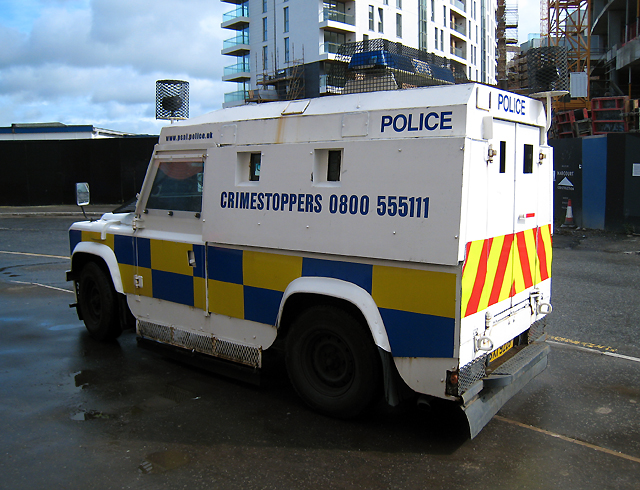
A PSNI Land Rover Tangi with the Crimestoppers number featured.

Crime Stoppers has since spread to Australia, Canada, and the United Kingdom. While the individual programs are local or regional in nature, mostly run by non-profit groups or directly by police, various national and international umbrella organizations exist. The toll-free telephone number +1-800-222-TIPS is used to reach various different Crime Stoppers groups in Canada and the U.S., although some groups publish their own numbers. In the UK, the Crime Stoppers number is 0800 555 111, and in Ireland it is 1800 25 00 25.

== See also ==
- Crimestoppers UK
- Crime Stoppers USA
- Crime Stoppers International
- Neighborhood watch
