= Grantland =

Sports and pop culture website owned by ESPN

- Website type: Sports, popular culture
- Available in: English
- Owner: ESPN
- Website: grantland.com
- Commercial: No
- Launched: 2011
- Current status: Shut down

Grantland was a sports and pop-culture blog owned and operated by ESPN. The blog was started in 2011 by veteran writer and sports journalist Bill Simmons, who remained as editor-in-chief until May 2015. Grantland was named after famed early-20th-century sportswriter Grantland Rice (1880–1954).

On October 30, 2015, ESPN announced that it was ending the publication of Grantland.

== History ==
=== Origins and concept ===
In early 2011, ESPN announced the creation of Grantland. The site was intended to focus on long-form content and feature contributions from both established writers and new voices in the fields of sports and entertainment. Simmons envisioned a platform that allowed for in-depth analysis and storytelling, akin to traditional magazine journalism but adapted for the digital age.

=== Launch and initial reception ===
Grantland officially launched on June 8, 2011. The site quickly gained attention for its ambitious and high-quality content. Articles ranged from deep dives into sports history to analytical pieces on contemporary pop culture phenomena. Early contributors included Chuck Klosterman, Malcolm Gladwell, and David Eggers, among others.

The launch was seen as a bold move by ESPN, given the declining attention spans of online readers and the increasing popularity of quick-hit content. However, the site's initial reception was positive, with many praising its fresh approach to sports and culture journalism.

=== Content and contributions ===
Grantland stood out for its diverse range of content. It featured long-form articles, shorter blog posts, and multimedia content such as podcasts and videos. The site's hallmark was its deep, thoughtful essays on both sports and pop culture topics. A significant aspect of Grantland's identity was its editorial independence. Despite being backed by ESPN, the site operated with considerable autonomy, allowing its writers to explore a wide range of topics and voices.

One of the most popular sections was "The Triangle," a basketball blog led by Simmons and featuring contributions from well-known NBA analysts. Another notable feature was the "Grantland Quarterly," a print publication that compiled the best content from the site.

=== Closure ===
In May 2015, ESPN's President John Skipper told The New York Times that ESPN would not be renewing Simmons' contract, effectively ending Simmons' tenure at ESPN. Later in the month, Chris Connelly was announced as interim editor-in-chief.

On October 30, 2015, ESPN officially announced the shut down of Grantland: "After careful consideration, we have decided to direct our time and energy going forward to projects that we believe will have a broader and more significant impact across our enterprise." The closing of Grantland was met with harsh criticism of ESPN, from both former writers of Grantland and admirers of the site. Former editor-in-chief Bill Simmons called the shutdown "simply appalling." ESPN president John Skipper said the decision to shut down the site was not a financial matter and instead was done because ESPN did not see the value in spending the time and energy necessary to continue the excellence of Grantland.

Grantland's closure was seen by many as another blow against long-form journalism. Huffington Post writer Justin Block writes, "In an era ruled by bite-sized content and dumbed-down click-bait journalism, Grantland's defining characteristic came at odds with sustainable finances." Grantland's articles were often long form and usually not instant but measured reactionary pieces, a trend not common in today's media landscape. Grantland was considered by some to be the highest-quality work under the umbrella of ESPN and received critical acclaim, but its financial success has been widely debated. Grantland received 6 million unique visitors in March 2015, a number that some people believed could not support a staff of 50 writers, editors and IT personnel. The shutdown was also coming at a time of relative financial uncertainty for ESPN. In September 2015, ESPN laid off 300 employees or approximately 5% of its workforce. It has also been widely reported that in 2015 ESPN lost 3.2 million subscribers due to consumers abandoning traditional cable packages.

== Content and legacy ==
Grantland was known for its long-form journalism and award-winning writing. Its sports journalism pieces often had a strong focus on sports analytics and data analysis, referencing and pulling data from sites like Football Outsiders, Baseball Prospectus, Synergy, and ESPN. Grantland wove statistics into part of the story and made the analytics understandable to the average sports fan. As Stephen Carter from the Chicago Tribune put it, "This was sportswriting for grownups." These pieces would also often include a data visualization representation. Some have concluded that Grantland's closure represents a trend in today's media business that unless you are one of the biggest web properties or smallest one-person "micro sites" it's tough to be economically viable.

Simmons started a new media venture in 2016, The Ringer, which, like Grantland, focuses on sports and pop culture. A number of former Grantland employees, including Sean Fennessey, Chris Ryan, Mallory Rubin, Juliet Litman, Craig Gaines, Bryan Curtis, Ryan O'Hanlon, Danny Chau, Shea Serrano, Jason Concepcion, Riley McAtee, Joe Fuentes, and Tate Frazier joined the new venture.

Additionally, Simmons has launched a podcasting network, featuring shows re-purposed from the Grantland network, including The Watch with Ryan and television critic Andy Greenwald and his own podcast The Bill Simmons Podcast.

Ryan and Greenwald also hosted a Game of Thrones re-cap show on HBO modeled after their Grantland podcast Watch the Thrones and produced by Simmons.

Simmons debuted a weekly show on HBO, titled Any Given Wednesday with Bill Simmons, on June 22, 2016, which ran for one season.

=== Dr. V controversy ===
An article written by Caleb Hannan and published on the Grantland website in January 2014 received considerable criticism from the transgender community. Hannan's article was about the Oracle GXI golf putter and its creator, Essay Anne Vanderbilt, referred to as Dr. V. Hannan found the putter to be extremely effective after Dr. V sent one to him to try out, but as his reporting continued he found that Dr. V's background and credentials were either fraudulent or couldn't be confirmed. A former coworker of Dr.V's told Hamman that she was a trans woman. Hannan incorporated it into the final part of the piece, which Dr. V reached out about and requested he didn't publish because she did not want to be identified as transgender publicly. He refused and kept it in the article. Before the article was published, Vanderbilt committed suicide.

Grantland's editor-in-chief Bill Simmons published a response to the criticism, acknowledging errors made by Grantland and Hannan, including Hannan's posthumous outing of Vanderbilt to one of her investors and Grantland's "collective ignorance about the issues facing the transgender community in general, as well as our biggest mistake: not educating ourselves on that front before seriously considering whether to run the piece". A profile of Simmons in Rolling Stone, published in April 2014, lambasted him at length over the Dr. V matter and incorporated criticism from senior ESPN personnel, but also included Simmons' defenses and disagreements with some of the harsher criticisms of the article.

== Writers ==
The site featured contributions from Simmons alongside other sports and pop-culture writers and podcasters including: Holly Anderson, Mallory Rubin, Katie Baker, Bill Barnwell, Rembert Browne, Andy Greenwald, Bryan Curtis, Kirk Goldsberry, Steven Hyden, Michael Weinreb, David Jacoby, Jonah Keri, Chuck Klosterman, Molly Lambert, Jane Leavy, Mark Lisanti, Zach Lowe, Robert Mays, Davy Rothbart, Sean McIndoe, Brian Phillips, Charles P. Pierce, former NBA player Jalen Rose, Shea Serrano, Andrew Sharp, Louisa Thomas and Mark Titus.

Former contributors include Men in Blazers duo Roger Bennett and Michael Davies, Spike Friedman, Tom Bissell, Lane Brown, Jason Concepcion, author Dave Eggers, author Malcolm Gladwell, Justin Halpern, Mark Harris, Jay Caspian Kang, screenwriter of the movie Rounders Brian Koppelman, Juliet Litman, Pulitzer Prize-winning journalist Wesley Morris, Chris Ryan, MacArthur Award-winning novelist Colson Whitehead, former sportswriter and television producer Nell Scovell, and Emily Yoshida.
