= Bill Simmons =

American podcaster and sportswriter (born 1969)

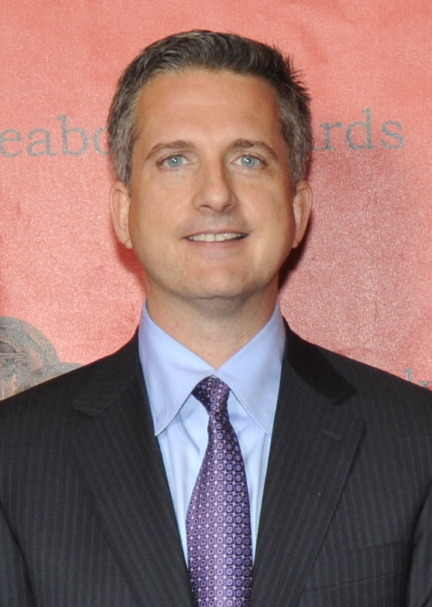
- Simmons in 2011
- Born: William John Simmons III; September 25, 1969 (age 57); Marlborough, Massachusetts, U.S.
- Education: College of the Holy Cross (BA); Boston University (MA)
- Occupations: Journalist, author, podcaster
- Spouse: Kari Crichton (m. 1999)
- Children: 2
- Awards: Shorty Award (Best in Sports, 2010)
- Website: theringer.com

William John Simmons III (born September 25, 1969) is an American sports podcaster, sportswriter, and cultural critic. He is the founder of the sports and pop culture website The Ringer.

Simmons first gained attention with his website as "The Boston Sports Guy" and was recruited by ESPN in 2001, where he eventually operated the website Grantland and worked for until 2015. At ESPN, he wrote for ESPN.com, hosted his own podcast on ESPN.com titled The B.S. Report and was an analyst for two years on NBA Countdown.

Simmons founded The Ringer, a sports and pop culture website and podcast network, in 2016 and is its CEO. He hosted Any Given Wednesday with Bill Simmons on HBO for one season in 2016. At The Ringer, he hosts The Bill Simmons Podcast.

== Early life and education ==
Simmons was born on September 25, 1969, to William Simmons and Jan Corbo. His father was a school administrator, and his stepmother, Molly Clark, is a doctor. Simmons was an only child and grew up in Marlborough and Brookline, Massachusetts, before moving to Stamford, Connecticut, to live with his mother after his parents divorced when he was 9. He attended the Greenwich Country Day School and then Brunswick School in Greenwich, Connecticut, for high school. In 1988, he completed a postgraduate year at Choate Rosemary Hall, a prep school located in Wallingford, Connecticut. As a child, Simmons read David Halberstam's book The Breaks of the Game, which he credited as the single most formative development in his sportswriting career.

After high school, Simmons attended the College of the Holy Cross. As an undergraduate at Holy Cross, he wrote a column for the school paper, The Crusader, called "Ramblings" and later became the paper's sports editor. He also restarted the school's parody newspaper and started a 12- to 14-page, underground, handwritten magazine about the people in his freshman hall called The Velvet Edge. He graduated from Holy Cross in 1992 with a B.A. degree in political science with a focus on the Middle East with a GPA of 3.04. Subsequently, while living in Brookline, Massachusetts, he studied at Boston University, where he earned a master's degree in print journalism two years later.

== Career ==
=== Origins ===
For eight years following grad school, Simmons lived in Charlestown working various jobs. The September after grad school, Simmons started working at the Boston Herald as a high school sports reporter and editorial assistant, mainly "answering phones... organizing food runs, [and] working on the Sunday football scores section." Three years later, he got a job as a freelancer for Boston Phoenix but was broke within three months and started bartending. In 1997, unable to get a newspaper job, Simmons "badgered" Digital City Boston of AOL into giving him a column, and he started the web site BostonSportsGuy.com while working as a bartender and waiter at night. He decided to call his column "Sports Guy" since the site had a "Movie Guy."

Originally, the column was only available on AOL, and Simmons forwarded the column to his friends. He began receiving e-mails from people asking if they could be put on his mailing list. For the first 18 months, Simmons would send it to about 100 people, until it became available on the web in November 1998. The website quickly built up a reputation as many of Simmons' friends from high school and college were e-mailing it to each other. In 2001, his website averaged 10,000 readers and 45,000 hits per day.

=== ESPN ===
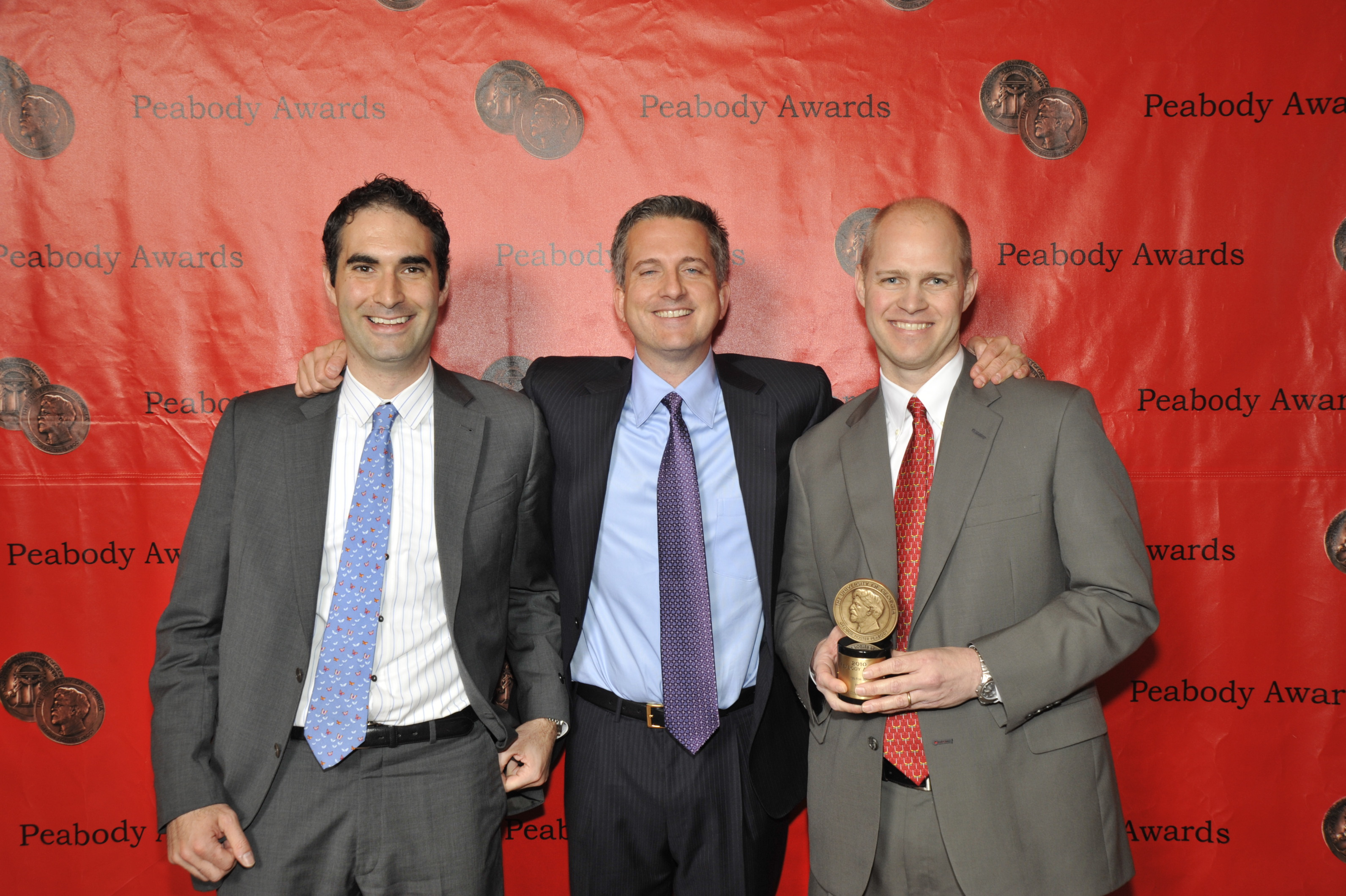
Connor Schell, Simmons and John Dahl at the 70th Annual Peabody Awards

Simmons gained fame as "The Boston Sports Guy", which earned him a job offer from ESPN in 2001 to write three guest columns. His second column was "Is Clemens the Antichrist?", which became one of the most e-mailed articles on the site that year. Becoming one of the most popular columnists on the site, Simmons was given his own section of ESPN.com's Page 2, which helped both himself and Page 2 gain widespread popularity. In the first sixteen months Simmons wrote for Page 2, its viewership doubled. In late 2004, ESPN launched an online cartoon based on his columns, which Simmons later called a "debacle" and decided to stop. Simmons wrote a column per month for his page titled "Sports Guy's World".

As a lead columnist, Simmons was one of the country's most widely read sports writers and is considered a pioneer of sportswriting on the Internet. His readership grew steadily over the following years. In 2005, according to ESPN, Simmons' column averaged 500,000 unique visitors a month. According to comScore, Simmons' column had averaged 1.4 million pageviews and 460,000 unique visitors per month between June and November 2009.

In 2007, Simmons and Connor Schell conceived the idea for 30 for 30, a series of 30 documentaries commemorating the 30th year of the "ESPN era." Simmons and Schell took special interest in "stories that resonated at the time but were eventually forgotten for whatever reason." The series premiered in October 2009, with "King's Ransom" directed by Peter Berg. Simmons served as executive producer on the project until he left ESPN in 2015.

In May 2007, Simmons began a podcast for ESPN.com called Eye of the Sportsguy. In June 2007, the podcast was changed to The B.S. Report with a new theme song written by Ronald Jenkees. Simmons created one or two hour-long podcasts a week, generally carrying one theme throughout, talking to everyone from sports and media notables to his friends. The B.S. Report was regularly the most downloaded podcast on ESPN.com, averaging 2 million downloads a month. In 2009, The B.S. Report was downloaded more than 25.4 million times.

Simmons began writing a bi-weekly 800-word column for ESPN The Magazine in 2002 but convinced ESPN after three years to give him 1,200 words. In July 2009, Simmons announced his retirement from the magazine but continued to write for the Page 2 website.

In October 2007, it was announced that Simmons joined the television series E:60 as a special contributor. In May 2010, it was reported that Simmons and ESPN came to an agreement on a new contract, although no official announcement was made on the terms.

Since 2009, Simmons has also been a moderator and panelist at the annual MIT Sloan Sports Analytics Conference. Starting in the 2012-2013 NBA season, Simmons joined the NBA Countdown pregame show as a panelist/contributor during ESPN/ABC's coverage of the NBA. He left the show prior to the 2014–2015 season in order to debut The Grantland Basketball Show, ESPN's first Grantland-branded television program.

ESPN announced in May 2015 that Simmons' contract, which was due to expire in September 2015, would not be renewed.

=== Jimmy Kimmel Live! ===
In the summer of 2002, Jimmy Kimmel began trying to convince Simmons to write for his new late-night talk show, which was to premiere after Super Bowl XXXVII the following winter. Simmons refused for most of the summer because he did not want to cut back on his columns and move to the West Coast away from his family and Boston teams. However, Kimmel kept "badgering" him and by mid-September, Kimmel had convinced him to join the show as a writer. Simmons was able to continue writing for ESPN.com and in ESPN The Magazine, which was possible because Disney owned both ESPN and ABC. He has also stated that he joined the show because he was burned out from his column, felt he needed a change, and always wanted to write for a talk show.

Simmons left Boston and moved to California in November 2002 and began working in April 2003 as a comedy writer for the Jimmy Kimmel Live!. Simmons has since referred to it as "the best move [he] ever made." He left the show in the spring of 2004, after a year and a half of writing for the show, in order to focus full-time on his column. However, Simmons remained in California.

=== Grantland ===
Simmons served as the editor-in-chief of Grantland, a website owned by ESPN covering sports and pop culture that launched on June 8, 2011. The website's name was a reference to deceased sportswriter Grantland Rice, though it was reportedly not Simmons' choice for the name. Sports blog Deadspin had previously reported in 2010 that Simmons was working on a "top secret editorial project." Some key contributors to the website included Jalen Rose, Zach Lowe, Kirk Goldsberry and Wesley Morris. In August 2014, ESPN announced that Simmons would be leaving NBA Countdown to produce an 18 episode primetime show for ESPN through his site called The Grantland Basketball Show—later changed to The Grantland Basketball Hour—which would debut in October 2014. In these episodes, Simmons discussed NBA-related current events as well as some of his more popular sports columns with his co-host Jalen Rose. Special guests included fellow journalists, pop culture celebrities, as well as current and former coaches and athletes. Months after ESPN decided not to renew its contract with Simmons, ESPN shut down the Grantland website on October 30, 2015.

=== HBO ===
In July 2015, Simmons announced he had signed a new multi-platform deal with HBO starting in October 2015. As part of this deal, he would host a weekly talk show, Any Given Wednesday. The show premiered on June 22, 2016. It was cancelled in November 2016. Simmons's multimedia deal with the network continued, and he announced plans for future projects at HBO. A documentary on André the Giant was co-produced by HBO Sports, the WWE, and the Bill Simmons Media Group, with Jason Hehir directing. The documentary aired on HBO on April 10, 2018.

In late July 2018, it was revealed HBO decided to renew Simmons's contract to remain with the network moving forward.

=== The Ringer ===
Simmons announced the launch of his new website, The Ringer, on February 17, 2016. The site was to be run as part of his venture, the Bill Simmons Media Group, that launched in the fall of 2015. The media group includes several podcasts focusing on different aspects of sports, pop culture, and technology, and features writers from The Ringer website as podcast hosts. The website also hired a number of staffers who formerly worked with Simmons at Grantland. The Ringer went live on June 1, 2016.

In May 2017, Vox Media announced that it had entered into a deal to provide advertising sales and access to its publishing platform as part of a revenue sharing agreement. Simmons retained editorial control of the website. In February 2020, Simmons announced that Spotify was buying The Ringer for approximately $200 million, with Daniel Ek describing The Ringer as "the new ESPN". Simmons stated that The Ringer would maintain content and editorial independence.

At The Ringer, Simmons is CEO, writing less than during his previous endeavors. He also hosts The Bill Simmons Podcast, which regularly rotates through conversations and interviews with Hollywood personalities, professional athletes, other media pundits, old friends, and his family. Regulars include his college roommate Joe House, Sal Iacono, Ryen Russillo, Chuck Klosterman, and Simmons' father.

In June 2020, Simmons received criticism for the lack of racial diversity in The Ringer following email comments he made to The New York Times, particularly that: "It's a business. This isn't Open Mic Night." Critics noted that Simmons employed his nephew as a producer and had created a podcast for his teenage daughter.

In October 2025, a number of Ringer podcasts, including The Bill Simmons Show, were acquired by Netflix for exclusive video distribution on the Netflix platform.

In August 2026, it was reported that viewers were responding negatively—via comments on shows' episode pages, Reddit communities, and other social media—to The Ringer's partnership with ChatGPT, especially Simmons' use of the chatbot during episodes of various show. In September 2026, the New York Times and others reported that Simmons was also "taking flak" from his Ringer co-hosts regarding his use of ChatGPT to create film reviews in the voice of deceased film critic Roger Ebert.

== Writing ==
On October 1, 2005, Simmons released his first New York Times best-selling book, Now I Can Die in Peace. The book is a collection of his columns, with minor changes and lengthy footnotes, leading up to the 2004 World Series victory by the Boston Red Sox. The book spent five weeks on The New York Times extended best-seller list.

In July 2008, Simmons announced that he would be taking 10 weeks off from writing columns for ESPN.com's Page 2 to concentrate on finishing his second book, The Book of Basketball: The NBA According to the Sports Guy, which was released on October 27, 2009. The book tries to decide who the best players and teams of all time really are and the answers to some of the greatest "What ifs?" in NBA history. It debuted at the top of The New York Times Best Seller list for non-fiction books.

== Style ==
When Simmons first started his website, he wrote what he thought friends would enjoy reading because he never understood how people could be sportswriters while claiming they did not care which team won, in the name of journalistic objectivity. Since Simmons was writing on the web, he figured that "in order to get people to read it, it had to be different from what people got in newspapers and magazines." He claims that he believed his job was not to get into the heads of the players, but into the heads of his readers, and to do so by updating frequently and being provocative, and get a discussion going with his readers. Simmons has stated that he "...will never write a traditional sports column."

With his column, Simmons aims to speak for, reconnect sportswriting with, and reproduce the experience for the average fan. Simmons' column writing is characterized by mixing sports knowledge, references to pop culture including movies and television shows, his non-sports-related personal life, his many fantasy sports teams, video games, and references to adult video. His columns often mention trips to Las Vegas or other gambling venues with his friends, including blackjack and sports gambling.

== Awards and recognition ==
In 2007, he was named the 12th-most influential person in online sports by the Sports Business Journal, the highest position on the list for a non-executive.

In 2023, Simmons was No. 8 on Sports Illustrated's "Top 10 Most Influential Personalities in Sports Media" list.

In 2025, he was included in Sports Business Journal's "Influence 125" list, featuring the 125 most influential people in sports business of the past 25 years.

== Controversies ==
In the past, a frequent column target for Simmons has been former New York Knicks coach and general manager Isiah Thomas. This led to Thomas threatening Simmons on Stephen A. Smith's radio show in early 2006, saying there would be "trouble" if they ever met in the street. Upon a meeting in Las Vegas, they both decided they were entertainers at heart. Simmons and Red Sox announcer Jerry Remy feuded over the presidency of Red Sox Nation. The Red Sox asked Simmons to run for the ceremonial position and he accepted. In a candidate's memo, Simmons remarked that he was a better choice than Remy because he is not a smoker. Remy criticized Simmons for about five minutes during a July 2007 NESN broadcast of a Red Sox–Royals game. Simmons later removed himself from consideration, and Remy was named president.

Simmons faced widespread critique in 2013 when he linked local fans' ambivalence about Memphis Grizzlies's chances to lingering trauma surrounding the assassination of Martin Luther King Jr. In September 2017, Simmons voiced his support for Jemele Hill, who became involved in controversy after tweeting her personal views on Donald Trump.

In September 2021, The New York Times published an investigation into The Ringer′s workplace culture. It included accusations that Simmons had tried to marginalize The Ringer′s newly formed union, through tactics such as bringing in contract workers and unfollowing writers on Twitter who had expressed support for the union.

In April 2022, Simmons drew criticism from current and former NBA players over his comment stating "...fuck Jalen Green" when discussing his choices for the All-Rookie team. Simmons later clarified that the expletive was a joke and not a personal attack, and that he was simply indicating his preference for Herb Jones as a candidate. In May 2022, Simmons hosted Jalen Green as a guest on his podcast, where the two discussed the controversy and cleared the air.

In June 2023, when referring to the mutual decision of Spotify and Prince Harry and Meghan, The Duchess of Sussex's Archewell productions to prematurely end a $20 million agreement and part ways after only 12 episodes of a podcast (Meghan's Archetypes podcast) and one holiday special, Simmons labelled the Prince and Duchess "fucking grifters". Simmons (who is an executive at Spotify overseeing podcast innovation and monetization) further stated: "'The Fucking Grifters'. That's the podcast we should have launched with them. I’ve got to get drunk one night and tell the story of the Zoom I had with Harry to try and help him with a podcast idea. It's one of my best stories [...] Fuck them. The grifters."

=== Conflicts with ESPN ===
At times, Simmons had tense and public battles with ESPN about creative freedom and censorship. In May 2008, Simmons was embroiled in a dispute with management at ESPN.com. When asked by the editors of Deadspin why he had not written a new column in more than two weeks, he said he was writing less because he loved writing his column and believed that he and ESPN had come to an agreement "on creative lines, media criticism rules, the promotion of the column and everything else on ESPN.com" but within a few months all of those things changed.

A month before the feud erupted, Simmons was scheduled to interview then-senator Barack Obama for a podcast. Obama was still running against then-senator Hillary Clinton for the Democratic nomination at the time. ESPN nixed the interview, saying they would allow their reporters and columnists to interview a presidential candidate only after the nomination had been finalized.

In November 2008, according to Deadspin, Simmons quit the B.S. Report due to corporate interference with his writing. The controversy revolved around the admission of blogger and pornstar Christian into an ESPN fantasy basketball league. Simmons was upset that his explanation of ESPN's refusal to allow him into the league was edited out of a podcast. On November 25, 2008, Simmons returned to recording his B.S. Report podcast with a disclaimer that said "The BS Report is a free flowing conversation that occasionally touches on mature subjects."

In late 2009, Simmons was punished by ESPN for writing tweets critical of Boston sports radio station WEEI's The Big Show. He was suspended from Twitter for two weeks, though he was still allowed to post tweets about his ongoing book tour. ESPN again suspended him from Twitter in March 2013 after he posted tweets critical of ESPN's First Take.

In September 2014, ESPN suspended Simmons for three weeks for criticizing NFL commissioner Roger Goodell's handling of the Ray Rice domestic violence case. During his podcast, Simmons accurately stated that Goodell was lying when he claimed that he did not know what was on the tape that showed Rice punching his fiancée in the face and knocking her out in a hotel elevator.

On May 8, 2015, ESPN president John Skipper announced that the sports media conglomerate would not be renewing Simmons' contract, which was set to expire in September 2015. On May 15, it was announced Simmons would no longer be working at ESPN, effective immediately.

== Personal life ==
Simmons has been married to Kari Simmons since 1999. She is mentioned as "The Sports Gal" in his columns. They have two children together. His father, William Simmons Jr. (born 1947), also referred to as "The Sports Dad", was the superintendent of schools in Easton, Massachusetts, for more than 15 years.

Sports

Simmons is a devoted fan of Boston's teams, including the Boston Red Sox, New England Patriots, and Boston Celtics. He was a longtime fan of the Boston Bruins and the NHL, but claims that their poor management led to him losing interest in them until the 2008 playoffs. He also says he is a fan of English Premier League football team Tottenham Hotspur, and he has had playful debates on football with previous ESPN colleague David Hirshey, a football columnist and die-hard fan of Tottenham's fierce rival Arsenal.

Philanthropy

Simmons made a scholarship gift to Northwestern University's Medill School of Journalism to support HBCU graduates. Simmons also donated to the Earl Monroe New Renaissance Basketball School, a charter high school in the Bronx.

== Influence ==
In May 2023, Simmons' reaction of sadness became a meme following the Celtics' Game 7 loss to the Heat. Simmons also has created numerous internet memes, most notably the Ewing Theory (though the idea was originally proposed by a reader), The Tyson Zone, New Owner Syndrome, and the Manning Face.

Simmons coined the name “Dorkapalooza” for the MIT Sloan Sports Analytics Conference.
