= 2017 Major League Baseball season =

2017 MLB season
- League: Major League Baseball
- Sport: Baseball
- Duration: April 2 – November 1, 2017
- Games: 162
- Teams: 30
- TV partner(s): Fox/FS1; TBS; ESPN; MLB Network

Draft
- Top draft pick: Royce Lewis
- Picked by: Minnesota Twins

Regular season
- Season MVP: AL: Jose Altuve (HOU); NL: Giancarlo Stanton (MIA)

Postseason
- AL champions: Houston Astros
- AL runners-up: New York Yankees
- NL champions: Los Angeles Dodgers
- NL runners-up: Chicago Cubs

World Series
- Champions: Houston Astros
- Runners-up: Los Angeles Dodgers
- World Series MVP: George Springer (HOU)

MLB seasons
- ← 2016 2018 →

Locations of AL teams for the 2013–2019 MLB seasons
West Central East
Locations of NL teams for the 2017–present MLB seasons
West Central East

The 2017 Major League Baseball season began on April 2 with three games, including the 2016 World Series champions Chicago Cubs facing off against the St. Louis Cardinals, the regular season ended in late September. The postseason began on October 3. The World Series began October 24 and Game 7 was played on November 1, in which the Houston Astros defeated the Los Angeles Dodgers in seven games, to capture their first World Series championship in franchise history.

The 88th Major League Baseball All-Star Game was held on July 11 at Marlins Park, the home of the Miami Marlins. For the first time since 2002 when the game ended in a tie, the All Star Game did not determine home field advantage for the World Series. Instead, home field advantage was awarded to the team with the better regular season record. The American League won 2–1 in 10 innings.

After the 2019 season, Mike Fiers alleged that the 2017 Astros used technology to illicitly steal their opponents' signs and relay it to their hitters. The Astros used this method throughout the 2017 season, and part of the 2018 season. MLB and the Astros opened an investigation into this sign stealing allegation. MLB found the Astros used technology to cheat during their 2017 season and suspended Astros' manager A. J. Hinch and Astros' general manager Jeff Luhnow for one year; the Astros fired Luhnow and Hinch the same day. Alex Cora, who was the Astros bench coach in 2017 and the Red Sox manager from 2018 to 2019, parted ways with the Red Sox after the scandal broke.

== Schedule ==
As has been the case since 2013, all teams played their four division opponents 19 times each for a total of 76 games. They played six or seven games against each of the other ten same-league opponents for a total of 66 games, and 20 inter-league games. The primary inter-league match-ups were AL East vs. NL Central, AL Central vs. NL West, and AL West vs. NL East. Teams also played four games against a designated interleague rival.

On March 9, it was announced that the Pittsburgh Pirates and St. Louis Cardinals would play a game at the minor league BB&T Ballpark in Williamsport, Pennsylvania, on August 20. The game coincided with the Little League World Series, held annually in nearby South Williamsport, and was exclusively attended by Little League players and their families.

=== Effect of Hurricanes Harvey and Irma ===
As a consequence of Hurricane Harvey damaging the Houston area, the three-game Lone Star Series between the Texas Rangers and Houston Astros from August 29 to 31 was moved from Minute Maid Park to Tropicana Field in St. Petersburg, Florida. Although the Astros were the designated home team, they wore their away uniforms during the series while the Rangers wore their home uniforms. The Astros returned to Minute Maid Park for a three-game series with the New York Mets, beginning with a split doubleheader on September 2.

The Tampa Bay Rays' three-game set with the New York Yankees from September 11 to 13 was moved from Tropicana Field to Queens' Citi Field due to Hurricane Irma's impending landfall on the Tampa Bay Area.

Irma's damage to South Florida also forced the Miami Marlins' three-game set with the Milwaukee Brewers from September 15 to 17 to move from Marlins Park to the Brewers' home field at Miller Park, with the Marlins as the designated home team. Similar to the Rangers–Astros series in Tampa Bay, the Marlins wore their away uniforms as the 'home' team, while the Brewers wore their home uniforms as the 'away' team.

== Rule changes ==
In March 2017, Major League Baseball and the Major League Baseball Players Association agreed to seven rule changes.

- The start of a no-pitch intentional walk, allowing the defensive team's manager to signal a decision to the home plate umpire to intentionally walk the batter. Following the signal of the manager's intention, the umpire will immediately award first base to the batter. This new rule was put into play to speed up the process of game time.
- A 30-second limit for a manager to decide whether to challenge a play and invoke replay review.
- When a manager has exhausted his challenges for the game, Crew Chiefs may now invoke replay review for non-home run calls beginning in the eighth inning instead of the seventh inning. Home runs can be reviewed at the crew chief's discretion at any time.
- A conditional two-minute guideline for Replay Officials to render a decision on replay review, allowing various exceptions.
- A prohibition on the use of any markers on the field that could create a tangible reference system for fielders.
- An addition to Rule 5.07 formalizes an umpire interpretation by stipulating that a pitcher may not take a second step toward home plate with either foot or otherwise reset his pivot foot in his delivery of the pitch. If there is at least one runner on base, then such an action will be called as a balk under Rule 6.02(a). If the bases are unoccupied, then it will be considered an illegal pitch under Rule 6.02(b).
- An amendment to Rule 5.03 requires base coaches to position themselves behind the line of the coach's box closest to home plate and the front line that runs parallel to the foul line prior to each pitch. Once a ball is put in play, a base coach is allowed to leave the coach's box to signal a player so long as the coach does not interfere with the play.

Furthermore, the collective bargaining agreement that goes in effect this season prohibits any player who makes plays his first game starting in the 2017 season from using tobacco at any time in a stadium, in official interviews, or appearances. Players who had service are not permitted to use tobacco in interviews or appearances, and cannot display any tobacco packages.

== Standings ==
=== American League ===
AL East
Team	W	L	Pct.	GB	Home	Road
^{(3)} Boston Red Sox	93	69	.574	—	48‍–‍33	45‍–‍36
^{(4)} New York Yankees	91	71	.562	2	51‍–‍30	40‍–‍41
Tampa Bay Rays	80	82	.494	13	42‍–‍39	38‍–‍43
Toronto Blue Jays	76	86	.469	17	42‍–‍39	34‍–‍47
Baltimore Orioles	75	87	.463	18	46‍–‍35	29‍–‍52

AL Central
Team	W	L	Pct.	GB	Home	Road
^{(1)} Cleveland Indians	102	60	.630	—	49‍–‍32	53‍–‍28
^{(5)} Minnesota Twins	85	77	.525	17	41‍–‍40	44‍–‍37
Kansas City Royals	80	82	.494	22	43‍–‍38	37‍–‍44
Chicago White Sox	67	95	.414	35	39‍–‍42	28‍–‍53
Detroit Tigers	64	98	.395	38	34‍–‍47	30‍–‍51

AL West
Team	W	L	Pct.	GB	Home	Road
^{(2)} Houston Astros	101	61	.623	—	48‍–‍33	53‍–‍28
Los Angeles Angels	80	82	.494	21	43‍–‍38	37‍–‍44
Seattle Mariners	78	84	.481	23	40‍–‍41	38‍–‍43
Texas Rangers	78	84	.481	23	41‍–‍40	37‍–‍44
Oakland Athletics	75	87	.463	26	46‍–‍35	29‍–‍52

=== National League ===
NL East
Team	W	L	Pct.	GB	Home	Road
^{(2)} Washington Nationals	97	65	.599	—	47‍–‍34	50‍–‍31
Miami Marlins	77	85	.475	20	42‍–‍36	35‍–‍49
Atlanta Braves	72	90	.444	25	37‍–‍44	35‍–‍46
New York Mets	70	92	.432	27	37‍–‍44	33‍–‍48
Philadelphia Phillies	66	96	.407	31	39‍–‍42	27‍–‍54

NL Central
Team	W	L	Pct.	GB	Home	Road
^{(3)} Chicago Cubs	92	70	.568	—	48‍–‍33	44‍–‍37
Milwaukee Brewers	86	76	.531	6	46‍–‍38	40‍–‍38
St. Louis Cardinals	83	79	.512	9	44‍–‍37	39‍–‍42
Pittsburgh Pirates	75	87	.463	17	44‍–‍37	31‍–‍50
Cincinnati Reds	68	94	.420	24	39‍–‍42	29‍–‍52

NL West
Team	W	L	Pct.	GB	Home	Road
^{(1)} Los Angeles Dodgers	104	58	.642	—	57‍–‍24	47‍–‍34
^{(4)} Arizona Diamondbacks	93	69	.574	11	52‍–‍29	41‍–‍40
^{(5)} Colorado Rockies	87	75	.537	17	46‍–‍35	41‍–‍40
San Diego Padres	71	91	.438	33	43‍–‍38	28‍–‍53
San Francisco Giants	64	98	.395	40	38‍–‍43	26‍–‍55

== Postseason ==
=== Bracket ===
Wild Card Games (ALWC, NLWC)
4	NY Yankees	1
5	Minnesota	0
4	Arizona	1
5	Colorado	0

Division Series (ALDS, NLDS)
1	Cleveland	2
4	NY Yankees	3
American League
2	Houston	3
3	Boston	1
1	LA Dodgers	3
4	Arizona	0
National League
2	Washington	2
3	Chicago Cubs	3

League Championship Series (ALCS, NLCS)
4	NY Yankees	3
2	Houston	4
1	LA Dodgers	4
3	Chicago Cubs	1

World Series
AL2	Houston	4
NL1	LA Dodgers	3

== Managerial changes ==
=== General managers ===
==== Offseason ====
Team	Former GM	Reason for leaving	New GM	Story/accomplishments
Arizona Diamondbacks	Dave Stewart	Fired	Mike Hazen	On October 3, 2016, General Manager Dave Stewart was fired, along with field manager Chip Hale. On October 16, 2016, Mike Hazen agreed to become the Executive Vice President and General Manager.
Boston Red Sox	Mike Hazen	Resigned	Dave Dombrowski (de facto)	On October 16, 2016, Mike Hazen agreed to become the Executive Vice President and General Manager of the Arizona Diamondbacks. Dave Dombrowski, President of Baseball Operations, assumed the role without making a formal announcement.
Minnesota Twins	Rob Antony	Interim	Thad Levine	On November 3, 2016, The Twins hired Thad Levine as their new Senior VP and General Manager. Levine will replace interim GM Rob Antony.

=== Field managers ===
==== Offseason ====
Team	Former manager	Reason for leaving	New manager	Story/accomplishments
Arizona Diamondbacks	Chip Hale	Fired	Torey Lovullo	On October 3, 2016, Chip Hale was fired as manager of the Arizona Diamondbacks. Hale finished with a 148–176 record with no playoff appearances in his two seasons as manager. On November 4, 2016, Torey Lovullo was hired as the new manager.
Atlanta Braves	Fredi González	Fired	Brian Snitker	On October 11, 2016, Brian Snitker was named as the new manager of the Atlanta Braves after completing the 2016 season as the interim manager. Snitker took over for Fredi González on May 17, 2016, and finished the season with a 59–65 record.
Chicago White Sox	Robin Ventura	Resigned	Rick Renteria	At the conclusion of the 2016 regular season, Chicago White Sox manager Robin Ventura resigned. On October 3, 2016, Rick Renteria became the team's new manager. Ventura finished his five seasons in Chicago with a record of 375–435 with no playoff appearances.
Colorado Rockies	Walt Weiss	Resigned	Bud Black	On October 3, 2016, Walt Weiss resigned as manager of the Colorado Rockies after four years without a winning record or a playoff appearance. Weiss finished with a 283–365 record during his tenure. On November 6, 2016, the Rockies announced they were hiring Bud Black as manager.

== League leaders ==
=== American League ===
Hitting leaders
Stat	Player	Total
AVG	Jose Altuve (HOU)	.346
OPS	Mike Trout (LAA)	1.071
HR	Aaron Judge (NYY)	52
RBI	Nelson Cruz (SEA)	119
R	Aaron Judge (NYY)	128
H	Jose Altuve (HOU)	204
SB	Whit Merrifield (KC)	34

Pitching leaders
Stat	Player	Total
W	Carlos Carrasco (CLE); Corey Kluber (CLE); Jason Vargas (KC)	18
L	Rick Porcello (BOS)	17
ERA	Corey Kluber (CLE)	2.25
K	Chris Sale (BOS)	308
IP	Chris Sale (BOS)	214.1
SV	Álex Colomé (TB)	47
WHIP	Corey Kluber (CLE)	0.869

=== National League ===
Hitting leaders
Stat	Player	Total
AVG	Charlie Blackmon (COL)	.331
OPS	Joey Votto (CIN)	1.032
HR	Giancarlo Stanton (MIA)	59
RBI	Giancarlo Stanton (MIA)	132
R	Charlie Blackmon (COL)	137
H	Charlie Blackmon (COL)	213
SB	Dee Gordon (MIA)	60

Pitching leaders
Stat	Player	Total
W	Clayton Kershaw (LAD)	18
L	Tyler Chatwood (COL); Matt Moore (SF); Clayton Richard (SD); Jeff Samardzija (SF)	15
ERA	Clayton Kershaw (LAD)	2.31
K	Max Scherzer (WSH)	268
IP	Jeff Samardzija (SF)	207.2
SV	Greg Holland (COL); Kenley Jansen (LAD)	41
WHIP	Max Scherzer (WSH)	0.902

== Milestones ==
=== Batters ===
- Madison Bumgarner (SF):
  - Became the first pitcher in Major League history to hit two home runs on Opening Day.
- Matt Holliday (NYY):
  - Recorded his 2,000th career hit with a single in the first inning against the Baltimore Orioles on April 8. He became the 281st player to reach this mark.
- George Springer (HOU):
  - Hit his Major League-record fourth leadoff homer in the first nine games of a season against the Seattle Mariners on April 11.
- Trey Mancini (BAL):
  - With his two home runs on April 16 against the Toronto Blue Jays, Mancini tied the Major League rookie home run record with seven home runs in his first 12 career games. He ties the record that was set by Trevor Story (2016) and Dino Restelli (1949).
- Albert Pujols (LAA):
  - Became the all-time RBI leader for Dominican-born Major Leaguers with his 1,832nd RBI passing Manny Ramirez. He delivered in the third inning with a single against the Toronto Blue Jays on April 23.
  - Hit his 600th career home run against the Minnesota Twins on June 3 and became the first member of the 600 home run club to earn his membership with a grand slam. He became the ninth player to reach this mark.
- Miguel Cabrera (DET):
  - Recorded his 450th career home run in the third inning against the Cleveland Indians on May 2. He became the 38th player to reach this mark.
- Aaron Judge (NYY):
  - Became the youngest player in Major League history to hit 13 home runs in his team's first 26 games with his home run against the Toronto Blue Jays on May 3.
  - Set the Yankee franchise rookie record for home runs by hitting his 30th on July 7 against the Milwaukee Brewers. He broke the record that was set by Joe DiMaggio in 1936. He also joins Mark McGwire as the only rookies in Major League history to reach 30 home runs before the All-Star break.
  - Set the Major League rookie record for home runs in a season by hitting his 50th of the year on September 25 against the Kansas City Royals. He broke McGwire's record that was set in 1987.
- Jose Reyes (NYM):
  - Recorded his 2,000th career hit with a single in the first inning against the Los Angeles Angels on May 20. He became the 282nd player to reach this mark.
  - Recorded his 500th career stolen base in the eighth inning against the San Diego Padres on July 24. He became the 39th player to reach this mark.
- Giancarlo Stanton (MIA):
  - Became the franchise leader in RBIs recording his 579th with a home run on June 2 against the Arizona Diamondbacks. He broke the record that was held by Mike Lowell.
  - Set the franchise record for home runs in a season by hitting his 43rd home run in the first inning against the San Francisco Giants on August 14. He broke the record that was set by Gary Sheffield in 1996.
- Scooter Gennett (CIN):
  - Became the 17th player in Major League history and the first Red in franchise history to hit four home runs in a game. He achieved the feat against the St. Louis Cardinals on June 6. He hit a grand slam in the third inning, a two-run homer in the fourth, a solo shot in the sixth, and another two-run homer in the eighth. Gennett also became the first player in Major League history with five hits, four homers and 10 RBIs in a game.
- Cody Bellinger (LAD):
  - With his fourth multi-homer game on June 13 against the Cleveland Indians, Bellinger became the fastest player in Major League history to have four multi-homer outbursts, doing so in 45 career games. He broke the record of 63 games set by Bob Horner in 1978.
  - With his 21st homer on June 19 against the New York Mets, Bellinger became the fastest rookie player in Major League history to reach the mark, doing so in just 51 career games. He broke the record of 55 games set by Wally Berger in 1930.
- Adrián Beltré (TEX):
  - Recorded his 450th career home run in the ninth inning against the Cleveland Indians on June 27. He became the 39th player to reach this mark.
  - Recorded his 600th career double in the first inning against the Boston Red Sox on July 4. He became the 17th player to reach this mark.
  - Recorded his 5,000th career total base with a home run in the second inning against the Los Angeles Angels on July 7. He became the 21st player to reach this mark.
  - Recorded his 3,000th career hit with a double in the fourth inning against the Baltimore Orioles on July 30. He became the 31st player, and the first Dominican-born player, to reach this mark.
- Mookie Betts (BOS):
  - Tied a Major League record by recording eight RBIs from the lead-off spot against the Toronto Blue Jays on July 2. The others to achieve this mark were Ronnie Belliard (Colorado Rockies, 2003), Jim Northrup (Detroit Tigers, 1973), Bill Glynn (Cleveland Indians, 1954) and Augie Bergamo (St. Louis Cardinals, 1945).
- Ichiro Suzuki (MIA):
  - Became the all-time leader for hits for a player born outside of the United States, with a single in the eighth inning against the St. Louis Cardinals on July 6. His single, which was his 3,054th career hit, broke the record held by Rod Carew.
- Victor Martinez (DET):
  - Recorded his 2,000th career hit with a single in the second inning against the Cleveland Indians on July 7. He became the 283rd player to reach this mark.
- Chase Utley (LAD):
  - Recorded his 1,000th career RBI with a double in the eighth inning against the Kansas City Royals on July 7. He became the 283rd player to reach this mark.
- Ryan Zimmerman (WSH):
  - Set the Expos/Nationals franchise record for home runs with his first inning home run against the Cincinnati Reds on July 17. The home run was Zimmerman's 235th career home run, passing the record that was set by Vladimir Guerrero.
- Edwin Encarnación (CLE):
  - Recorded his 1,000th career RBI with a grand slam in the 11th inning against the Los Angeles Angels on July 25. He became the 284th player to reach this mark.
- Brian Goodwin / Wilmer Difo / Bryce Harper / Ryan Zimmerman (WSH):
  - Became the eighth group of players to hit four consecutive home runs in the fourth inning on July 27 against the Milwaukee Brewers.
- Brian Goodwin / Wilmer Difo / Bryce Harper / Ryan Zimmerman / Anthony Rendon (WSH):
  - Become the sixth group of players in Major League history to hit five home runs in one inning in the fourth inning against the Toronto Blue Jays on July 27.
- Steve Pearce (TOR):
  - Tied the Major League record for most walk-off grand slams hit by a single batter within a single season by hitting his second on July 30. Cy Williams and Jim Presley had accomplished the feat in 1926 and 1986, respectively. With Pearce's previous one coming only three days prior on July 27, Pearce became the first player in Major League history to hit multiple walk-off grand slams within the span of a single week.
- Nick Markakis (ATL):
  - Recorded his 2,000th career hit with a single in the fourth inning against the Los Angeles Dodgers on August 3. He became the 284th player to reach this mark.
- Robinson Cano (SEA):
  - Recorded his 500th career double in the first inning against the Kansas City Royals on August 4. He became the 63rd player to reach this mark.
- Adrián González (LAD):
  - Recorded his 2,000th career hit with a double in the sixth inning against the Pittsburgh Pirates on August 22. He became the 285th player to reach this mark.
- Rhys Hoskins (PHI):
  - Hit his 11th home run in his first 18 Major League games on August 27 against the Chicago Cubs. He became the fastest player since 1913 to hit their first 11 home runs. He also did it in 17 fewer at bats than any player in history.
- Brandon Phillips (LAA)/(ATL):
  - Recorded his 2,000th career hit with a single in the first inning against the Philadelphia Phillies on August 30. He became the 286th player to reach this mark.
- José Ramírez (CLE):
  - Hit three doubles and two home runs against the Detroit Tigers on September 3. He became the 13th player to have five extra-base hits in a game.
- J.D. Martinez (AZ)/(DET):
  - Became the 18th player in Major League history to hit four home runs in a game on September 4 against the Los Angeles Dodgers.

=== Pitchers ===
==== No-hitters ====
- Edinson Vólquez (MIA):
  - Threw his first career no-hitter by defeating the Arizona Diamondbacks 3–0 on June 3. Vólquez walked two and struck out ten while facing the minimum on 98 pitches, 65 of them being strikes. This was the sixth no-hitter in franchise history.

==== Other pitching accomplishments ====
- Chris Sale (BOS):
  - Tied a Major League record by striking out ten or more batters in eight consecutive starts.
  - Became the fastest pitcher to reach 1,500 strikeouts in Major League history on August 29. Sale struck out Kevin Pillar in the second inning. Sale took 1,290 innings to reach this plateau breaking the record of 1,303 innings held by Kerry Wood.
- Clayton Kershaw (LAD):
  - Recorded his 2,000th career strikeout against the Milwaukee Brewers on June 2 by striking out Jonathan Villar in the second inning. He became the 79th player to reach this mark. Kershaw reached this mark in 1,836 innings, then the third-fastest total in Major League history, trailing only Hall of Famers Pedro Martínez (1,715 1/3) and Randy Johnson (1,734).
- Max Scherzer (WSH):
  - Recorded his 2,000th career strikeout against the Texas Rangers on June 11 by striking out Nomar Mazara to start the fourth inning. He became the 80th player to reach this mark. Scherzer became the third fastest ever to reach this mark by innings by reaching this mark in 1,784 innings, trailing only Pedro Martínez and Randy Johnson.
- Kenley Jansen (LAD):
  - Recorded his 200th career save by closing out a 9–7 win against the Cincinnati Reds on June 11. He became the 49th player to reach this mark.
- Jon Lester (CHC):
  - Recorded his 150th career win with a victory against the New York Mets on June 13. He became the 257th player to reach this mark.
  - Recorded his 2,000th career strikeout against the Arizona Diamondbacks on August 1 by striking out Jack Reinheimer in the fourth inning. He became the 82nd player, and 25th left-hander, to reach this mark.
- Corey Kluber (CLE):
  - Became the fastest in franchise history to record 1,000 career strikeouts by striking out Yasiel Puig of the Los Angeles Dodgers on June 15 in the fifth inning. He accomplished this feat in 148 games, breaking the record of 167 games set by Bob Feller.
- James Shields (CWS):
  - Recorded his 2,000th career strikeout against the Oakland Athletics on June 24 by striking out Khris Davis to end the second inning. He became the 81st player to reach this mark.
- Zach Britton (BAL):
  - Set the American League for most consecutive saves converted by closing out the Orioles win against the Houston Astros on July 23 for his 55th in a row.
- Aroldis Chapman (NYY):
  - Recorded his 200th career save by closing out a 3–2 win against the Tampa Bay Rays on September 13. He became the 50th player to reach this mark.

=== Miscellaneous ===
- The Arizona Diamondbacks set a Major League record by recording nine consecutive games where Arizona pitchers recorded ten or more strikeouts between April 24 and May 3, 2017. The Diamondbacks recorded their strikeouts during a four-game set with the San Diego Padres, followed by three games against the Colorado Rockies, and the first two games of a three-game set against the Washington Nationals. Fourteen different Diamondbacks pitchers recorded a total of 113 strikeouts over the nine game period.
- The New York Yankees and Chicago Cubs set a Major League record for most strikeouts in a game with 48 on May 7 in a game that lasted 18 innings. The previous record of 43 was set on July 9, 1971, in a game between the California Angels and the Oakland Athletics.
- Joe Maddon became the 63rd manager in Major League history to have 1,000 or more victories as his Chicago Cubs defeated the Cincinnati Reds on May 15. He reached this mark in 1,871 games.
- The Los Angeles Dodgers and Milwaukee Brewers set a National League record for most strikeouts in a game with 42 on June 2 in a game that lasted 12 innings. The Brewers tied their own Major League record for strikeouts in a game with 26.
- On June 3, Major League Baseball set a record for the most grand slams hit in a single day with seven. In order, they were hit by Kyle Schwarber of the Chicago Cubs, Travis Shaw of the Milwaukee Brewers, Chris Taylor of the Los Angeles Dodgers, Matt Adams of the Atlanta Braves, Ian Desmond of the Colorado Rockies, Albert Pujols of the Los Angeles Angels of Anaheim, which was the 600th home run of his career, and Mike Zunino of the Seattle Mariners.
- Oakland Athletics rookies Matt Olson, Jaycob Brugman, and Franklin Barreto made history when they became the first teammates ever to all hit their first career home runs in the same game against the Chicago White Sox on June 24. All three of them homered off of James Shields, who recorded his 2,000th career strikeout during the game.
- The Cleveland Indians became the first team since the 1935–36 Chicago Cubs to have 14-plus-game win streaks in consecutive seasons with their victory over the Chicago White Sox on September 6. The Indians also won 14 straight games in 2016.
- With their 11–0 victory against the Detroit Tigers on September 11, the Cleveland Indians became the first team to have a +100 or better run differential in a 19-game span since the 1939 New York Yankees and the first team to allow 32 runs or fewer in a 19-game span since the 1916 New York Giants. On September 13 they set the American League record for consecutive wins with 21 with a 5–3 win over the Detroit Tigers; they also moved into a tie with the 1935 Chicago Cubs for second place all-time. The Indians subsequently claimed sole possession of the second-longest winning streak all time with their 22nd consecutive victory on September 14 with a 3–2 walk off win in extra innings against the Kansas City Royals, only for their winning streak to come to an end the next day with a 4–3 loss to the Royals.
- In their 16–0 shutout victory over the San Diego Padres on September 12, the Minnesota Twins became the first MLB team ever to homer in each of the first seven innings.
- On September 19, the Royals' Alex Gordon hit a solo home run against the Toronto Blue Jays for the 5,694th combined home run of the season across Major League Baseball. This broke the previous record of 5,693 home runs hit in 2000 for the most combined home runs hit in a single season in Major League history. It would finish the season hitting a combined 6,105 home runs across Major League Baseball.

== Other news ==
- August 12: The Miami Marlins announced that a signed agreement to sell the franchise had been forwarded to the MLB main offices for review. Under the agreement, Jeffrey Loria would sell the team for $1.2 billion to a group led by venture capitalist Bruce Sherman, with Derek Jeter in charge of business and baseball operations. The sale was expected to be approved by owners in September and closed after the end of the regular season.

== Awards and honors ==
=== Regular season ===
Baseball Writers' Association of America Awards
BBWAA Award	National League	American League
Rookie of the Year	Cody Bellinger (LAD)	Aaron Judge (NYY)
Cy Young Award	Max Scherzer (WSH)	Corey Kluber (CLE)
Manager of the Year	Torey Lovullo (AZ)	Paul Molitor (MIN)
Most Valuable Player	Giancarlo Stanton (MIA)	Jose Altuve (HOU)
Gold Glove Awards
Position	National League	American League
Pitcher	Zack Greinke (AZ)	Marcus Stroman (TOR)
Catcher	Tucker Barnhart (CIN)	Martin Maldonado (LAA)
1st Base	Paul Goldschmidt (AZ)	Eric Hosmer (KC)
2nd Base	DJ LeMahieu (COL)	Brian Dozier (MIN)
3rd Base	Nolan Arenado (COL)	Evan Longoria (TB)
Shortstop	Brandon Crawford (SF)	Andrelton Simmons (LAA)
Left field	Marcell Ozuna (MIA)	Alex Gordon (KC)
Center field	Ender Inciarte (ATL)	Byron Buxton (MIN)
Right field	Jason Heyward (CHC)	Mookie Betts (BOS)
Silver Slugger Awards
Pitcher/Designated Hitter	Adam Wainwright (STL)	Nelson Cruz (SEA)
Catcher	Buster Posey (SF)	Gary Sanchez (NYY)
1st Base	Paul Goldschmidt (AZ)	Eric Hosmer (KC)
2nd Base	Daniel Murphy (WSH)	Jose Altuve (HOU)
3rd Base	Nolan Arenado (COL)	Jose Ramirez (CLE)
Shortstop	Corey Seager (LAD)	Francisco Lindor (CLE)
Left Field	Marcell Ozuna (MIA)	Justin Upton (LAA)/(DET)
Center Field	Charlie Blackmon (COL)	George Springer (HOU)
Right Field	Giancarlo Stanton (MIA)	Aaron Judge (NYY)

=== Other awards ===
- The Sporting News Player of the Year Award: Jose Altuve (HOU)
- Comeback Players of the Year: Mike Moustakas (KC, American); Greg Holland (COL, National)
- Edgar Martínez Award (Best designated hitter): Nelson Cruz (SEA)
- Hank Aaron Award: Jose Altuve (HOU, American); Giancarlo Stanton (MIA, National)
- Roberto Clemente Award (Humanitarian): Anthony Rizzo (CHC)
- Mariano Rivera AL Reliever of the Year Award (Best AL reliever): Craig Kimbrel (BOS)
- Trevor Hoffman NL Reliever of the Year Award (Best NL reliever): Kenley Jansen (LAD)
- Warren Spahn Award (Best left-handed pitcher): Clayton Kershaw (LAD)

Fielding Bible Awards
Position	Player
Pitcher	Dallas Keuchel (HOU)
Catcher	Martin Maldonado (LAA)
1st Base	Paul Goldschmidt (AZ)
2nd Base	DJ LeMahieu (COL)
3rd Base	Nolan Arenado (COL)
Shortstop	Andrelton Simmons (LAA)
Left Field	Brett Gardner (NYY)
Center Field	Byron Buxton (MIN)
Right Field	Mookie Betts (BOS)
Multi-position	Javier Baez (CHC)

=== Monthly awards ===
==== Player of the Month ====
Month	American League	National League
April	Mike Trout	Ryan Zimmerman
May	Carlos Correa	Charlie Blackmon
June	Aaron Judge	Andrew McCutchen
July	Jose Altuve	Nolan Arenado
August	Manny Machado	Giancarlo Stanton
September	Aaron Judge	J. D. Martinez

==== Pitcher of the Month ====
Month	American League	National League
April	Dallas Keuchel	Iván Nova
May	Lance McCullers	Alex Wood
June	Corey Kluber	Max Scherzer
July	James Paxton	Rich Hill
August	Corey Kluber	Jake Arrieta
September	Corey Kluber	Stephen Strasburg

==== Rookie of the Month ====
Month	American League	National League
April	Aaron Judge	Antonio Senzatela
May	Aaron Judge	Cody Bellinger
June	Aaron Judge	Cody Bellinger
July	Yulieski Gurriel	Paul DeJong
August	Andrew Benintendi	Rhys Hoskins
September	Aaron Judge	José Martínez

==== Reliever of the Month ====
Month	American League	National League
April	Cody Allen	Greg Holland
May	Craig Kimbrel	Greg Holland
June	Roberto Osuna	Kenley Jansen
July	Edwin Díaz	Brad Hand
August	Álex Colomé	Corey Knebel
September	Aroldis Chapman	Sean Doolittle

== Home field attendance and payroll ==
Team name	Wins	%±	Home attendance	%±	Per game	Est. payroll	%±
Los Angeles Dodgers	104	14.3%	3,765,856	1.7%	46,492	$201,466,263	−12.9%
St. Louis Cardinals	83	−3.5%	3,448,337	0.1%	42,572	$129,652,933	−13.8%
San Francisco Giants	64	−26.4%	3,303,652	−1.8%	40,786	$177,399,833	0.2%
Toronto Blue Jays	76	−14.6%	3,203,886	−5.5%	39,554	$158,890,575	−13.0%
Chicago Cubs	92	−10.7%	3,199,562	−1.0%	39,501	$177,210,667	0.6%
New York Yankees	91	8.3%	3,154,938	3.0%	38,950	$182,424,700	−5.6%
Los Angeles Angels	80	8.1%	3,019,585	0.1%	37,279	$181,125,500	29.6%
Colorado Rockies	87	16.0%	2,953,650	13.5%	36,465	$106,650,000	18.9%
Boston Red Sox	93	0.0%	2,917,678	−1.3%	36,021	$200,550,750	−8.3%
Milwaukee Brewers	86	17.8%	2,627,705	13.5%	31,282	$68,439,300	31.4%
Washington Nationals	97	2.1%	2,524,980	1.7%	31,173	$175,587,301	14.8%
Texas Rangers	78	−17.9%	2,507,760	−7.5%	30,960	$207,326,274	−2.3%
Atlanta Braves	72	5.9%	2,505,252	24.0%	30,929	$119,705,250	59.6%
New York Mets	70	−19.5%	2,460,622	−11.8%	30,378	$176,615,252	13.8%
Houston Astros	101	20.2%	2,403,671	4.2%	29,675	$157,656,400	76.2%
Detroit Tigers	64	−25.6%	2,321,599	−6.9%	28,662	$118,375,600	−40.8%
Kansas City Royals	80	−1.2%	2,220,370	−13.2%	27,412	$127,555,817	1.9%
San Diego Padres	71	4.4%	2,138,491	−9.1%	26,401	$49,248,767	−2.8%
Seattle Mariners	78	−9.3%	2,135,445	−5.8%	26,364	$172,438,700	25.7%
Arizona Diamondbacks	93	34.8%	2,134,375	4.8%	26,350	$106,580,200	35.9%
Minnesota Twins	85	44.1%	2,051,279	4.4%	25,324	$103,932,500	11.4%
Cleveland Indians	102	8.5%	2,048,138	28.7%	25,286	$114,427,167	21.1%
Baltimore Orioles	75	−15.7%	2,028,424	−6.6%	25,042	$161,621,633	5.1%
Pittsburgh Pirates	75	−3.8%	1,919,447	−14.7%	23,697	$102,953,333	26.8%
Philadelphia Phillies	66	−7.0%	1,905,354	−0.5%	23,523	$86,276,000	1.7%
Cincinnati Reds	68	0.0%	1,836,917	−3.0%	22,678	$79,315,786	2.6%
Chicago White Sox	67	−14.1%	1,629,470	−6.7%	20,117	$97,842,000	−13.7%
Miami Marlins	77	−2.5%	1,583,014	−7.6%	20,295	$111,591,100	54.0%
Oakland Athletics	75	8.7%	1,475,721	−3.0%	18,219	$51,560,000	−6.2%
Tampa Bay Rays	80	17.6%	1,253,619	−2.5%	15,477	$79,473,033	64.8%

== Technology changes ==
For the 2017 season, the TrackMan component of Major League Baseball's Statcast platform has replaced the previous PITCHf/x system for official measurements of pitch speed. The new system uses a doppler radar to calculate pitch speed based on maximum velocity (typically from the release of the pitch), rather than the speed measured 55 feet (17 m) from home plate. The change in data source has led to discrepancies in pitch speed reports between those reported in 2016 and 2017, with some pitches registering slightly higher speeds than with the previous system.

== Uniforms ==
=== Wholesale changes ===
The Arizona Diamondbacks tweaked their uniform set that was unveiled last season. The pant stripes now reach to the hip, while the gradient below was removed. The road uniform lettering is also changed to improve visibility.

The San Diego Padres unveiled new home and road uniforms, with noticeable changes such as the team name and the removal of yellow on the home uniforms, the bowtie-shaped lettering in the city name on the road uniforms, and the interlocking "SD" on both uniforms.

=== Alternate changes ===
The Kansas City Royals unveiled an updated version of their gold-trimmed white uniform, featuring gold numbers and blue lettering. It was paired with a blue cap featuring the gold 'KC' lettering, and was worn on Friday home games.

The Washington Nationals unveiled a white alternate uniform featuring the 'curly W' logo in a Stars and Stripes design. It was paired with two caps featuring the 'curly W' Stars and Stripes design: a navy cap with red brim, and a red cap with navy brim. The uniforms were worn during patriotic-themed and weekend day games.

Coinciding with Canada's 150th anniversary, the Toronto Blue Jays unveiled a red alternate uniform featuring a monochrome red rendition of the team's logo, complete with red belts, socks and cleats, and a red cap featuring the maple leaf logo. It was worn on Sunday home games and select other games in the month of July. They also promoted their white-paneled home caps to alternate status after wearing them once the past two seasons.

The Cleveland Indians retired their cream alternate uniforms. The red caps that were formerly paired with the cream uniforms will now be worn with the navy alternates at select home games.

The Cincinnati Reds changed their caps on Military Appreciation nights from camo to olive, with a white horseshoe "C".

The Pittsburgh Pirates changed their caps on Thursday home games to mustard, while still wearing their camo jerseys.

The New York Mets changed the brim of their home alternate caps from orange to blue, while the Mr. Met patch on both alternate uniforms were replaced with the primary Mets logo.

=== Spring training changes ===
All spring training uniforms in 2017 featured a pattern on the names and numbers. The pattern was the same for all 30 teams. In addition, seven teams unveiled new caps to be worn for spring training. The New York Yankees introduced a home cap with a pinstripe visor and a road cap with a grey crown and a navy visor. The Seattle Mariners replaced their compass logo with their original M-shaped trident updated in current team colors. The Chicago Cubs added an alternate cap featuring an "angry cub" logo. The Atlanta Braves added a solid navy cap with a tomahawk. Tampa Bay Rays added a powder blue cap with a white front panel, featuring their starburst logo. Cleveland Indians changed the front panel of their cap from white to red. The New York Mets replaced the "Mr. Met" logo with their "NY" logo.

=== Anniversaries and special events ===
The following teams wore commemorative patches for special occasions:

Team	Special occasion
All teams	Pink ribbons for breast cancer awareness (May 13–14, Mother's Day weekend)
All teams	"Play Ball" patch in partnership with USA Baseball and USA Softball (June 3–4)
All teams	Blue ribbons for prostate cancer awareness (June 17–18, Father's Day weekend)
All teams	Gold ribbons for childhood cancer awareness (September 1)
Atlanta Braves	First season at SunTrust Park
Baltimore Orioles	25th anniversary of Oriole Park at Camden Yards
Boston Red Sox	15th anniversary of the Red Sox Foundation (August 18–20)
Chicago Cubs	2016 World Series Championship (April 10 and 12)
Chicago White Sox	Mark Buehrle number retirement (June 24)
Chicago White Sox	100th anniversary of 1917 World Series championship
Cincinnati Reds	Pete Rose statue dedication (June 17)
Cleveland Indians	Frank Robinson number retirement (May 28)
Detroit Tigers	"Mr. I" patch in memory of Mike Ilitch
Houston Astros	"Houston Strong" patch in memory of the victims of Hurricane Harvey (from September 2 onwards)
Kansas City Royals	"ACE 30" patch in memory of Yordano Ventura
Los Angeles Angels	In memory of Don Baylor (from August 11 onwards)
Los Angeles Dodgers	AIDS awareness ribbons (May 15)
Miami Marlins	2017 All-Star Game
Miami Marlins	Number 16 patch in memory of José Fernández
Miami Marlins	"FELO" patch in memory of Felo Ramírez (from August 30 onwards)
Minnesota Twins	30th anniversary of 1987 World Series championship
Minnesota Twins	In memory of pitching prospect Yorman Landa (April 3)
New York Yankees	Derek Jeter number retirement (May 14)
New York Yankees	Black armband on left sleeve in memory of Gene Michael (from September 7 onwards)
Philadelphia Phillies	"DP" patch in memory of Dallas Green
St. Louis Cardinals	50th anniversary of 1967 World Series championship (May 16)
San Francisco Giants	AIDS awareness ribbons (May 15)
Seattle Mariners	40th anniversary of the franchise
Seattle Mariners	Edgar Martínez number retirement (August 12)
Texas Rangers	Iván Rodríguez Hall of Fame induction (July 28–30)
Toronto Blue Jays	25th anniversary of 1992 World Series championship

=== Other uniforms ===
The Cubs wore gold-trimmed numbers and letters on the backs of their shirts April 10 and 12 to mark their winning the 2016 World Series title.

Players, managers, coaches and umpires wore #42 on April 15, the 70th anniversary of Jackie Robinson's debut in the majors.

On April 17 (Patriots' Day), the Boston Red Sox wore home white jerseys with "BOSTON" written on the front to mark the four-year anniversary of the Boston Marathon bombings. The uniform also sported the 2013 navy-blue circular patch with a white border on the left shoulder saying "B Strong" (with the red B in the classic font featured on the Red Sox's caps).

The Padres wore camouflage uniforms on April 23, Air Force Appreciation Day. They wore them again on June 25, Naval Appreciation Day.

The Reds and Giants wore Spanish language "Los Rojos" and "Gigantes" uniforms May 5, Cinco de Mayo. The Reds wore them again on September 22. The Reds' "Los Rojos" uniforms have "Los Rojos" in the style of the Reds' script wordmark, and do not have the player's number or the "C" on them.

All 30 teams wore pink-colored caps and jerseys, undershirts and socks May 13 and 14, Mother's Day.

The Reds wore camo uniforms May 20, June 6 (the 73rd anniversary of D-Day), August 4 and September 19. The uniforms had the "Reds" script wordmark on their front, instead of the player's number and their "C" logo.

The Orioles wore a uniform with the Flag of Maryland May 20. Their caps featured the Maryland flag, as well.

Teams wore green-colored caps and jerseys, undershirts and socks May 27, May 28 and 29, Memorial Day in the United States. The Blue Jays didn't wear them on May 27 and 28, but did May 29, even though Memorial Day is not a holiday in Toronto, the province of Ontario, or anywhere in Canada. The Rockies wore them again on July 9, which was Military Appreciation Day.

The Rays wore blue "fauxback" uniforms for the first game of a doubleheader against the Athletics June 10.

All teams wore blue-colored caps and jerseys, undershirts and socks June 17 and 18, Father's Day. The Dodgers and Reds wore the uniforms on June 18 only.

All teams wore patriotic jerseys, undershirts and socks July 1–4. The Brewers did not wear them July 1. The Blue Jays wore red caps July 3–4, and their jerseys included a flipped US flag on one sleeve and a Canadian flag on the other during that time.

The Tigers wore their Spanish-language "Tigres" uniforms August 12. The uniforms were based on the uniforms that the Tigers only wore during the 1960 season.

The Mariners wore Spanish-language "Marineros" uniforms September 9.

Teams wore caps with an American flag design September 11, the 16th anniversary of the September 11 attacks. The Blue Jays wore caps with both Canadian and American flags.

The Braves wore Spanish-language "Los Bravos" uniforms September 17.

The Reds wore green uniforms September 23. The uniforms have a shamrock on the right sleeve and the Reds script wordmark on the front, instead of the player's number and the "C" logo.

==== Players Weekend ====
The weekend of August 25–27 was the inaugural Players Weekend, organized jointly by MLB and the MLB Players Association, during which all 30 teams wore special uniforms. The first use of the special uniforms was on August 20 by the Cardinals and Pirates for the MLB Little League Classic, played in Williamsport, Pennsylvania, during the 2017 Little League World Series in nearby South Williamsport. Players Weekend also coincided with the final days of the LLWS. The uniforms dramatically differed from regular uniforms in several respects:

- All jerseys were pullovers with contrasting sleeves. Apart from the Reds and Phillies, which respectively used white and off-white for the main body of the jersey, all teams used colors in that area.
- All jerseys had player names on the back; players were encouraged (but not required) to use nicknames instead of family names (or, in the case of Ichiro Suzuki, his given name). Notably, Players Weekend marked the first time that an official Yankees jersey had a name on the back.
- The jerseys were complemented with special colored caps. Many featured slight modifications of the teams' current logos, but some used completely new logos. For example, the Phillies' cap logo for Players Weekend was a blue Liberty Bell.
- The jerseys and caps featured a special logo showing a player's progression from youth to adulthood. The design drew cues from the official Little League and MLB logos.
- The aforementioned logo also appeared on a special "Thank You" sleeve patch on each jersey. This patch included a blank space that allowed each player to write in the name of a key figure in his baseball development.
- All teams used special multi-colored socks, all with the same design.
- Normal color restrictions on accessories such as shoes and batting gloves were relaxed to allow more self-expression.

=== Throwback uniforms ===
The Indians and Royals wore Negro leagues throwbacks May 7. The Indians wore the uniforms of the Cleveland Buckeyes, and the Royals wore the uniforms of the Kansas City Monarchs.

The Red Sox and Cardinals wore 1967 throwbacks May 16 to mark the 50th anniversary of the Cardinals' 1967 World Series title.

The Padres wore 1990s throwbacks June 14 and August 2.

The Cubs and Pirates wore Negro leagues throwbacks June 16. The Cubs wore the uniforms of the Leland Giants, while the Pirates wore the uniforms of the Homestead Grays.

The Astros and Mariners wore 1977 throwbacks June 24.

The Indians and Tigers wore Negro leagues throwbacks July 1. The Indians wore the uniforms of the Cleveland Buckeyes, and the Tigers wore the uniforms of the Detroit Stars.

The Padres and Phillies wore 1983 throwbacks July 7 and 9.

The Angels and Rangers wore 1977 throwbacks July 8. The Rangers wore their away throwbacks, even though they were the home team.

The Phillies and Brewers wore 1982 throwbacks July 14–16 as part of a weekend where members of the Brewers' 1982 AL champion team reunited.

The Indians and White Sox wore 1917 throwbacks July 29 to mark the 100th anniversary of the White Sox winning the 1917 World Series title.

The Indians wore red 1970s throwbacks August 12. Their opponents, the Rays, wore their "fauxbacks".

The Reds and Brewers wore Negro leagues throwbacks August 12. The Reds wore the uniforms of the Cincinnati Tigers (which were hand-me-downs from the Reds in the 1930s), and the Brewers wore the uniforms of the Milwaukee Bears.

The Rangers and Astros wore 1999 throwbacks August 12 as part of the Rangers retiring the #7 of 1999 AL MVP Ivan Rodriguez, who played for the 1999 AL West-winning Rangers (the Astros were in the NL Central in 1999, which they won).

The Astros wore 1997 Major League Baseball season throwbacks August 19. The uniforms appeared with the Jackie Robinson 50th anniversary patch, which all teams wore that season.

The Orioles wore 1992 Major League Baseball season throwbacks on August 19. The uniforms were in honor of the first season at Oriole Park at Camden Yards.

== Venues ==
This was the Atlanta Braves' first season at SunTrust Park in Cumberland, Georgia. It succeeds Turner Field as the Braves' home ballpark. The first regular season game at SunTrust Park was on April 14, 2017, against the San Diego Padres.

There were plans to host some games at Olympic Stadium in London, England during the season but the plans were dropped after a lack of time for negotiations. There was a series played in London in 2019, between the Yankees and the Red Sox.

== Television ==
=== National ===
==== United States ====
This was the fourth year of the current eight-year deals with Fox Sports, ESPN and TBS. Fox aired eight weeks of baseball on Saturday Night leading up to the 2017 Major League Baseball All-Star Game which also aired on Fox. Fox then televised Saturday afternoon games for the last four weeks of the regular season. Fox Sports 1 televised games on Tuesday nights and on Saturdays both during the afternoon and night. ESPN televised games on its flagship telecast Sunday Night Baseball, as well as Monday and Wednesday nights. TBS televised Sunday afternoon games for the last 13 weeks of the regular season. Fox and ESPN Sunday Night Baseball telecasts will be exclusive; all other national telecasts will be subject to local blackout. ESPN also had national exclusivity for the Cubs home opener and World Series/NLCS pennant raising ceremony on April 10.

TBS televised the National League Wild Card Game, Division Series, and Championship Series. ESPN televised the American League Wild Card, Fox Sports 1 and MLB Network televised the American League Division Series, and Fox and Fox Sports 1 televised the American League Championship Series. The World Series aired exclusively on Fox for the 18th consecutive year.

Major League Baseball reached an agreement with Facebook to stream 20 games. The streams were simulcasts of one of the teams broadcasts.

== Radio ==
=== Local ===
CBS Radio's WIP-FM renewed its contract with for Philadelphia Phillies play-by-play for the 2017 season.

=== National ===
ESPN Radio aired its 20th season of national coverage, including Sunday Night Baseball, Saturday games, Opening Day and holiday games, the All-Star Game, and Home Run Derby, and the entire Major League Baseball postseason.

== Retirements ==
- Brennan Boesch announced his retirement on April 11.
- Jed Bradley announced his retirement on May 5.
- Cory Luebke announced his retirement on May 8.
- Jeff Francoeur announced his retirement on May 12.
- Nolan Reimold announced his retirement on May 28.
- Joe Beimel announced his retirement on June 25.
- Jeremy Guthrie announced his retirement on July 31.
- Jered Weaver announced his retirement on August 16.
- Paul Janish announced his retirement on August 21.
- Joe Nathan announced his retirement on September 1.
- Will Venable announced his retirement on September 6.
- Ryan Vogelsong announced his retirement on September 17.
- Bronson Arroyo announced his retirement on September 24.
- Matt Cain announced on September 27 that he will retire at the end of the season.
- Carlos Beltran announced his retirement on November 13.
- Umpire Dale Scott announced his retirement on December 12.
- Former first-round pick Mark Appel announced he is taking an "indefinite break" from the game on February 1, 2018.
- Jonny Gomes announced his retirement on February 1, 2018.
- Eric Fryer announced his retirement on February 12, 2018.
- Andrew Bailey announced his retirement on February 26, 2018.

== Retired numbers ==
- Derek Jeter had his #2 retired by the New York Yankees on May 14. It is the 21st number retired and the last single-digit number circulated by the organization.
- Frank Robinson had his #20 retired by the Cleveland Indians on May 28. It is the ninth number retired by the organization.
- David Ortiz had his #34 retired by the Boston Red Sox on June 23. It is the 11th number retired by the organization.
- Mark Buehrle had his #56 retired by the Chicago White Sox on June 24. It is the 12th number retired by the franchise.
- Edgar Martínez had his #11 retired by the Seattle Mariners on August 12. It is the third number retired by the organization.
- Iván Rodríguez had his #7 retired by the Texas Rangers on August 12. It is the fourth number retired by the organization.

== See also ==
- 2017 in baseball
- 2017 KBO League season
- 2017 Nippon Professional Baseball season
