= Kyle Boddy =

American baseball pitching trainer and consultant (born 1983)

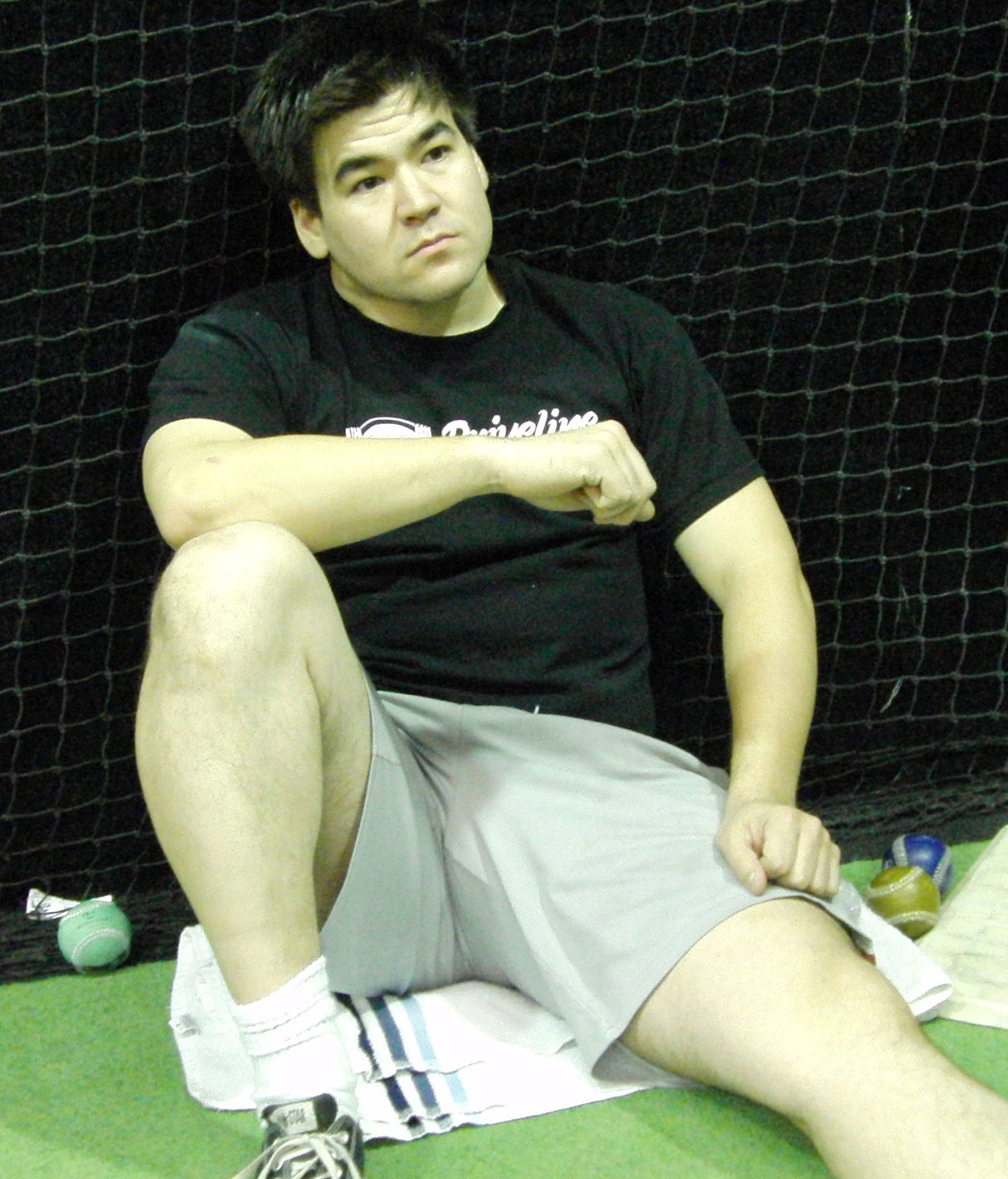
- Boddy in 2009
- Born: 1983 (age 42–43); Parma, Ohio, U.S.
- Education: Baldwin Wallace University
- Occupations: Founder, Driveline Baseball
- Years active: 2008–present
- Website: Official website

Kyle Boddy (born 1983) is an American baseball pitching trainer and consultant. He is the founder and owner of the baseball performance training system Driveline Baseball, which uses a sabermetric approach to increase pitching velocity and improve conditioning.

== Early life and education ==
Boddy was born and raised in Parma, Ohio. He attended Baldwin Wallace University in Berea, Ohio, where he studied computer science and economics before ultimately dropping out.

== Career ==
=== Data science and coaching ===
After college, Boddy worked exposing security flaws at PokerStars, an online poker site; at Microsoft for a year; and in various data science jobs. He also coached baseball at Roosevelt High School in Seattle for two years. Reading Michael Lewis' 2003 book Moneyball, about Oakland Athletics general manager Billy Beane's sabermetric approach to assembling his team, inspired Boddy to start researching and testing player development methods.

=== Driveline Baseball ===
In 2008, Boddy started a blog called Driveline Mechanics. It relied heavily on the theories of former Major League Baseball pitcher Mike Marshall. To test out his own theories, Boddy created his own biomechanics lab in Seattle, which included high-speed cameras, EMG sensors, force plates, inertial measurement units, and a device to measure elbow torque. Through research in his lab, and incorporating research from University of Hawaii professor Coop DeRenne, Boddy found that throwing with underweight and overweight baseballs would have a significant effect on velocity improvements, and that more throwing leads to healthier arms, as long as it's done with proper mechanics and sufficient recovery.

Boddy founded Driveline Baseball in 2012. At its training facility in Kent, Washington, Boddy coaches amateur and pro pitchers from a variety of levels on ways to increase their velocity and improve their conditioning. Major League Baseball clients include Clayton Kershaw, Kenley Jansen, Alex Wood, Trevor Bauer, Dan Straily, Caleb Cotham, Chris Capuano, Joe Beimel, and Matt Boyd. Many more MLB Players have used or are using Driveline or their products remotely. Boddy has worked as a consultant and pre-draft analyst for MLB teams including the Los Angeles Dodgers and Cleveland Indians, and as a consultant for college programs including Vanderbilt, Oregon State and Coastal Carolina, which won the 2016 College World Series. Driveline also works with high schools across the United States, and offers camps in Washington state for pitchers as young as 9 years-old.

The first MLB player to work with Driveline was Cleveland Indians pitcher Trevor Bauer, who had achieved his own success in gaining velocity and was looking to improve his command. Bauer's fastball is considered to be among the hardest in baseball. Boddy and Bauer met in 2012, after Boddy presented his pitching research at the Texas Baseball Ranch in Montgomery, Texas. Bauer, who was in attendance, appreciated the science of Boddy's presentation. After struggling in Triple-A Columbus in 2013, Bauer began to train with Boddy at Driveline Baseball in Seattle prior to the 2014 season. Although Boddy's system was at first met with resistance from baseball insiders, it has since 2014 been steadily getting more recognition and approval.

The training program aims to be a full pitching-development service, to "develop healthy, high velocity pitchers of any age." It incorporates weighted baseballs and elements of recovery, mechanics and command, as well as the work of other pitching experts, such as Mike Marshall, Tom House, Ron Wolforth, Alan Jaeger and Coop DeRenne. The data-driven program emphasizes command, rehab from injury, pitch design and spin rate. It measures directly what is happening inside a pitcher's body as he throws the ball, breaking it down to help pitchers to best utilize their mechanics. Driveline uses Rapsodo's pitch-tracking camera and TrackMan technology, which uses a military-grade 3D Doppler radar system to capture 20,000 measurements per second, to track a baseball's movement. With a focus on exactly how much torque and turning a pitcher needs to do, pitchers are regularly able to increase the speed of their fastball by 2 to 4 miles per hour. In June 2020, Boddy opened the second Driveline location in Arizona. In early 2021, Boddy opened the third location in Texas

=== Books ===
In 2013, Boddy published The Dynamic Pitcher, a training guide tailored to youth baseball pitchers. The following year, he published Hacking the Kinetic Chain, a guide to developing pitching velocity.

=== Cincinnati Reds ===
In October 2019, Boddy was hired by the Cincinnati Reds to be their Minor League Director of Pitching Initiatives/Pitching Coordinator. Other MLB teams had pursued him as well. Boddy continues to remain affiliated with Driveline. On September 17, 2021, it was announced that they "mutually agreed to no longer continue their professional relationship" with the Cincinnati Reds. He now consults for the Boston Red Sox.

== See also ==
- Jeff Passan, The Arm: Inside the Billion-Dollar Mystery of the Most Valuable Commodity in Sports, Chapter 15: "The New Frontier" (Harper, 2016)
