= Exit velocity =

Baseball statistic

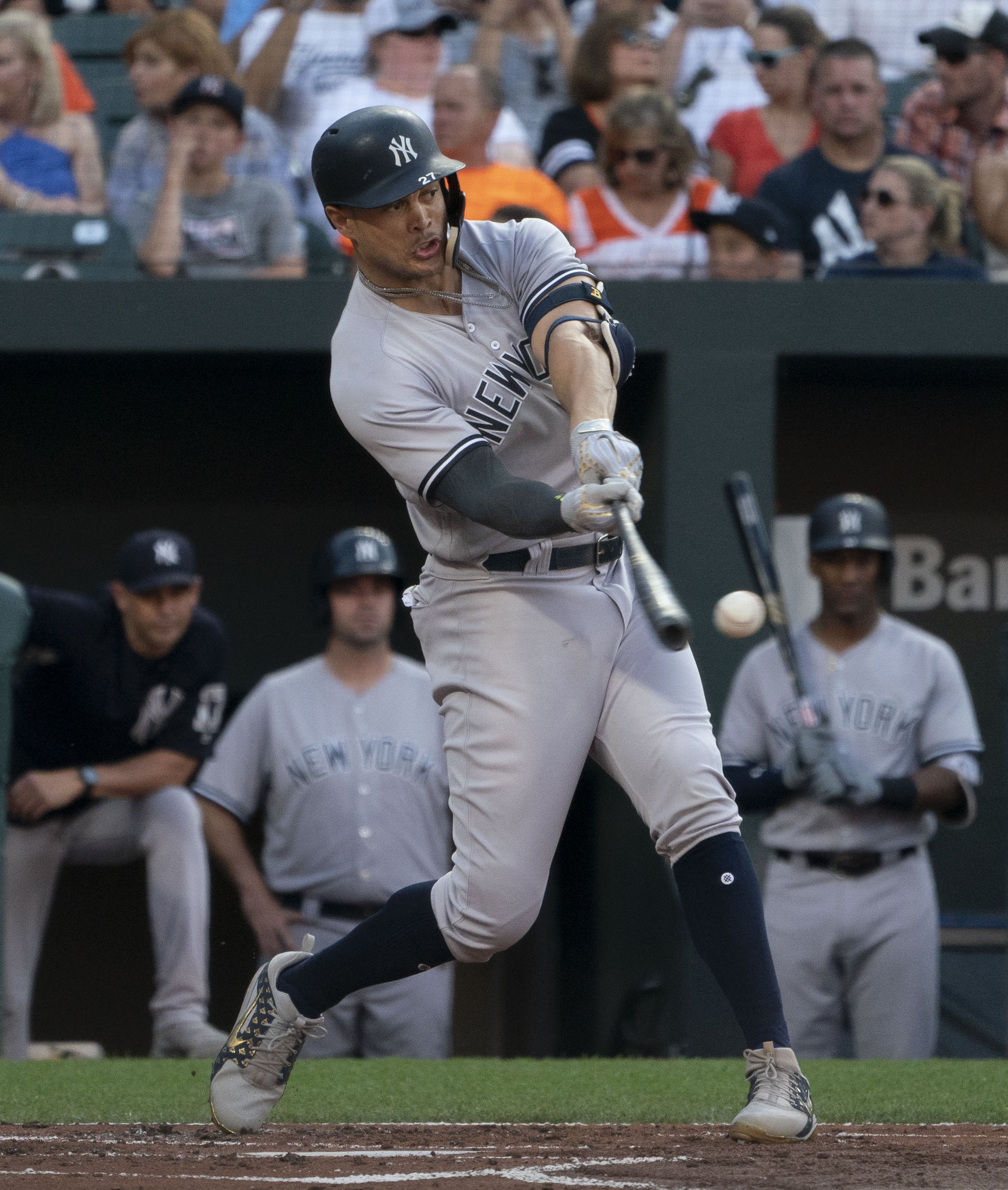
Giancarlo Stanton held the MLB record for highest exit velocity at 122.2 miles per hour (196.7 km/h) from 2015 to 2022

In baseball statistics, exit velocity (EV) is the estimated speed at which a batted ball is travelling as it is coming off the player's bat. Batters generally aim for a higher exit velocity in order to give opposing fielders less time to react and attempt a defensive play.

Exit velocity was first tracked by Major League Baseball (MLB) in 2015 with the introduction of Statcast. In MLB and many other North American baseball leagues, exit velocity is measured and presented in miles per hour.

== Origins ==
For most of baseball's history, there were no commonplace methods to quantify how hard-hit a batted ball was — the only aspect of the ball's speed being tracked was how fast the pitcher threw it, measured using various evolutions of radar guns. In 2015, MLB introduced Statcast technology to all 30 of its ballparks, in part to track exit velocity. The league released its initial data the following year in a summary of the 2015 season's statistical notabilities. Throughout the 2016 season, more aspects of exit velocity were gradually rolled out to fans. MLB launched Baseball Savant in 2016 to provide fans easy access to exit velocity and other Statcast-recorded data.

== External factors ==
=== Ballparks ===
Since every MLB stadium has its own unique set of dimensions and intricacies, there has been an observed ballpark-to-ballpark difference in exit velocity stats despite attempts to curtail it. MLB originally installed TrackMan radar technology but switched to the optical-based Hawk-Eye system in 2020 — with both systems, the league was unable to avoid variances in data collection based on each ballpark. When Statcast is unable to accurately record exit velocity data for a batted ball, either because of ballpark factors or some other reason, it imputes a value in its place.

=== Equipment ===
Exit velocity can vary based on whether or not the ball is moisturized with a humidor. From April 7 to May 22, 2021, the average exit velocity was 91.8 miles per hour (147.7 km/h) with a humidor and 92.8 miles per hour (149.3 km/h) without a humidor. During the same span of days in 2022, the average with a humidor was 91.2 miles per hour (146.8 km/h) and 92.2 miles per hour (148.4 km/h) without a humidor.

== Uses ==
Since its introduction, MLB teams have used the exit velocity stat to gauge a batter's abilities. Transversely, exit velocity can be analyzed to improve a pitcher's results, especially those prone to giving up hard contact. Statcast technology in MLB ballparks allows teams to analyze exit velocity data points in real-time during games and make adjustments accordingly.

The use of exit velocity stats has been criticized by some. In 2018, Chicago Cubs manager Joe Maddon expressed his thoughts on advanced stats, stating: "Keep your launch angles, keep your exit velocities, give me a good at-bat." Maddon added that exit velocity and similar stats should instead be used to analyze potential player acquisitions. In 2023, a former New York Yankees prospect criticized the organization for an alleged over-reliance on analytics, specifically citing a training game called "pitchers vs. hitters" that required a batter to hit a ball 95 miles per hour (153 km/h) or draw a walk to win.

According to Rotoballer, exit velocity can be used by fantasy baseball players to predict various outcomes and make roster decisions.
