= Sabermetrics =

Analysis of baseball statistics

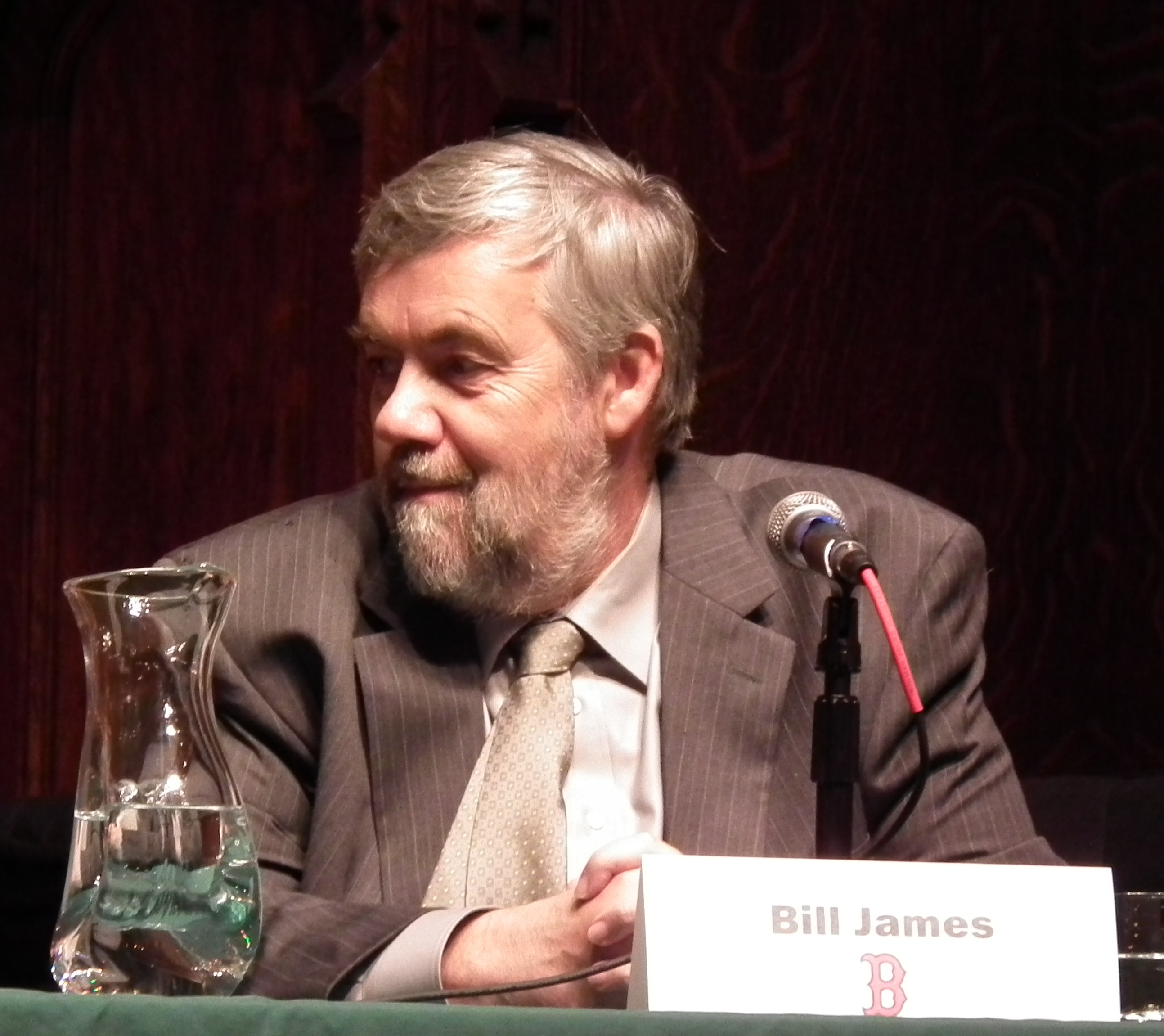
Bill James, who coined the term "sabermetrics"

Sabermetrics (originally SABRmetrics) is the original or blanket term for sports analytics for the empirical analysis of baseball, especially the development of advanced metrics based on baseball statistics that measure in-game activity. The term is derived from the movement's progenitors, members of the Society for American Baseball Research (SABR), founded in 1971, and was coined by Bill James (in 1980, according to SABR.org), who is one of its pioneers and considered its most prominent advocate and public face.

The term moneyball refers to the use of metrics to identify "undervalued players" and sign them to what ideally will become "below market value" contracts; it began as an effort by small-market teams to compete with the much greater resources of big-market ones.

== Early history ==
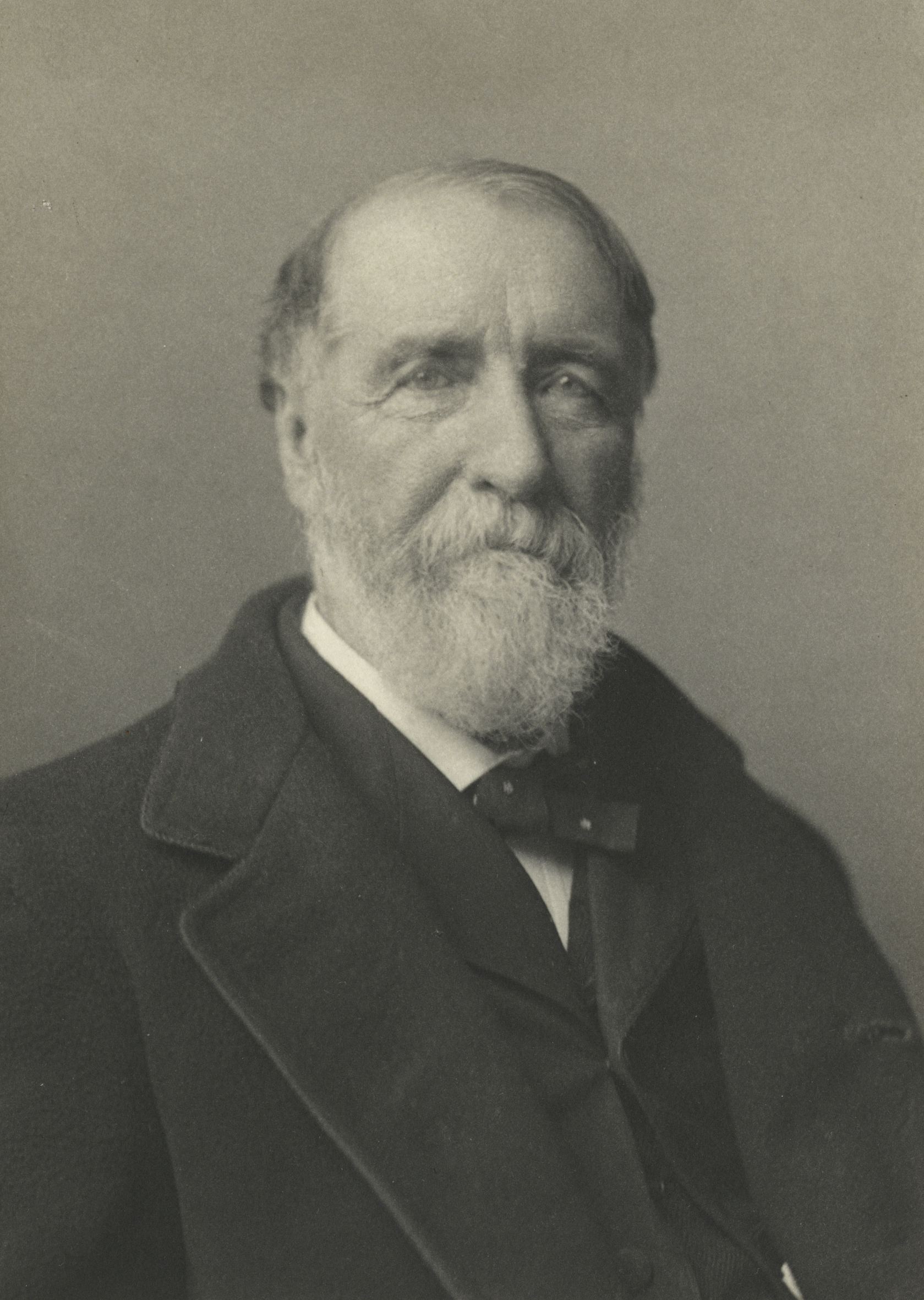
English-American sportswriter Henry Chadwick, the "father" of baseball statistics

English-American sportswriter Henry Chadwick developed the box score in New York City in 1858. This was the first way statisticians were able to describe the sport of baseball by numerically tracking various aspects of game play. The box score gives baseball statisticians a summary of the individual and team performances for a given game.

What would become the earliest Sabermetrics research in the 1970s and 1980s began in the middle of the 20th century with the writings of Earnshaw Cook, one of the earliest baseball analysts. Cook's 1964 book Percentage Baseball was one of the first of its kind. At first, most organized baseball teams and professionals dismissed Cook's work as meaningless. The idea of a science of baseball statistics began to achieve legitimacy in 1977 when Bill James began releasing Baseball Abstracts, his annual compendium of baseball data. However, James's ideas were slow to find widespread acceptance.

Bill James believed there was a widespread misunderstanding about how the game of baseball was played, claiming the sport was not defined by its rules but actually, as summarized by engineering professor Richard J. Puerzer, "defined by the conditions under which the game is played – specifically, the ballparks but also the players, the ethics, the strategies, the equipment, and the expectations of the public." Early Sabermetricians – sometimes considered baseball statisticians – began trying to enhance such fundamental baseball statistics as batting average (simply hits divided by at-bats) with advanced mathematical formulations. The correlation between team batting average and runs scored was also examined, as runs – not hits – win ballgames. Thus, a good measure of a player's worth would be his ability to help his team score runs, which was observed to be highly correlated with his number of times on base – leading to the development of a new stat, "on-base percentage".

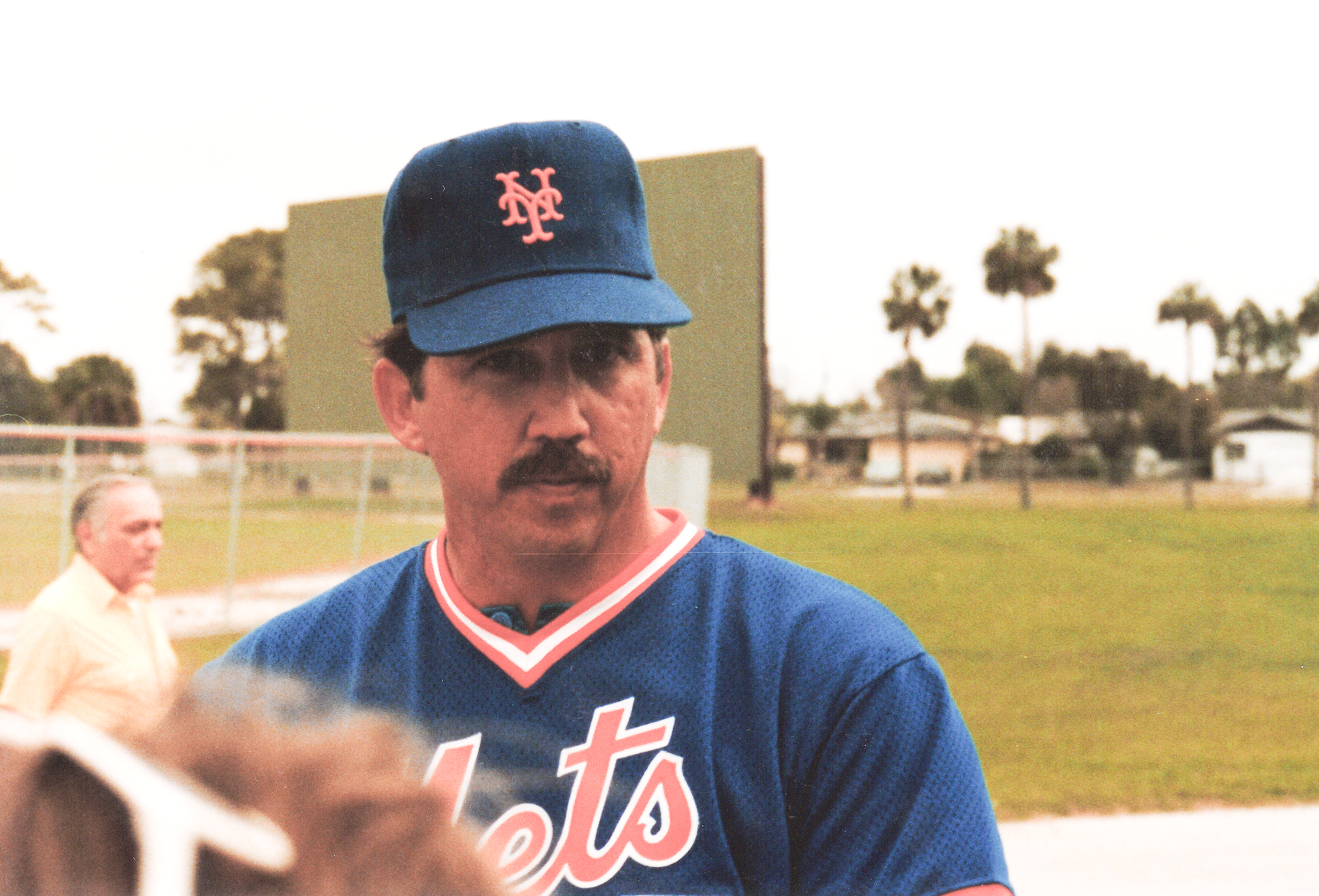
MLB advanced metrics pioneer Davey Johnson (in 1986)

Before Bill James popularized sabermetrics, Davey Johnson, then a second baseman playing for the early 1970s Baltimore Orioles of Major League Baseball (MLB), used an IBM System/360 at team owner Jerold Hoffberger's brewery to write a FORTRAN-based baseball computer simulation. In spite of his results, he was unable to persuade his manager Earl Weaver that he should bat second in the lineup. He wrote IBM BASIC programs to help him manage the Tidewater Tides, and after becoming manager of the New York Mets in 1984, he arranged for a team employee to write a dBASE II application to compile and store advanced metrics on team statistics. Craig R. Wright was another employee in MLB, working with the Texas Rangers in the early 1980s. During his time with the Rangers, he became known as the first front office employee in MLB history to work under the title "sabermetrician".

David Smith founded Retrosheet in 1989, with the objective of computerizing the box score of every major league baseball game ever played, in order to more accurately collect and compare the statistics of the game.

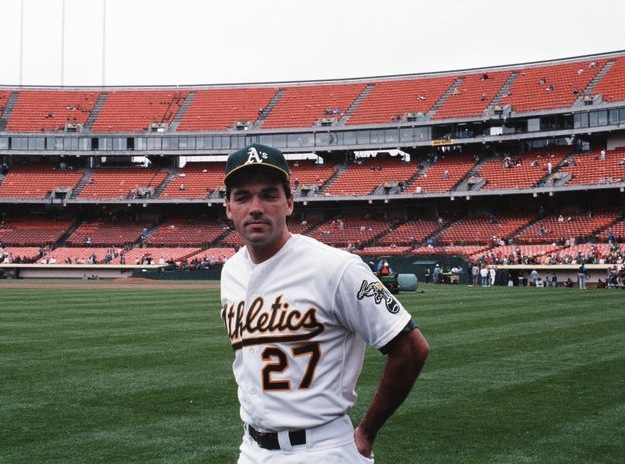
Billy Beane as a player in 1989

The Oakland Athletics began to use a more quantitative approach to baseball by focusing on sabermetric principles in the 1990s. This initially began with Sandy Alderson as the general manager of the team when he used the principles toward obtaining relatively undervalued players. His ideas were continued when Billy Beane took over as general manager in 1997, a job he held until 2015, and hired his assistant Paul DePodesta. During the 2002 season, a noted "moneyball" Oakland A's team went on to win 20 games in a row, a term (and approach to the game) which soon gained national recognition when Michael Lewis published Moneyball: The Art of Winning an Unfair Game (where "unfair" reflected the disparity in resources available to the big market teams versus the small) in 2003 to detail Beane's use of advanced metrics. In 2011, a film based on Lewis' book – also called Moneyball – was released and gave broad exposure to the techniques used in the Oakland Athletics' front office.

== Traditional measurements ==
Sabermetrics reflected a desire by a handful of baseball enthusiasts to expand their understanding of the game by revealing new insights that may have been hidden in its traditional statistics. Their early efforts ultimately evolved into evaluating players in every aspect of the game, including batting, pitching, baserunning, and fielding.

=== Batting measurements ===
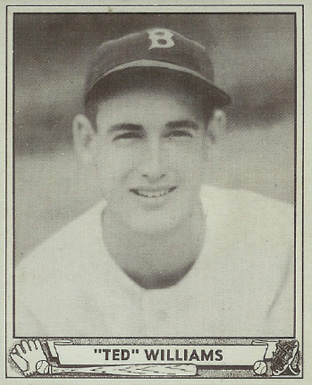
Ted Williams, the last MLB player to bat .400 for a season (in 1941)

A ballplayer's batting average (BA) (simply hits divided by at-bats) was the historic measure of a player's offensive performance, enhanced by slugging percentage (SA) (Note: Calculated by dividing total bases (the non-situational cumulative tally of all hits) by the total number of times at bat.) which incorporated their ability to hit for power.

Bill James, along with other early sabermetricians, was concerned that batting average did not incorporate other ways a batter can reach base besides a hit – as a batter on base can score runs, and runs, not hits, win ballgames.

Even though slugging percentage and an early form of on-base percentage (OBP) – which takes into accounts base on balls ("walks") and hit-by-pitches – date to at least 1941, pre-dating both Bill James (born 1949) and SABR (formed 1971), enhanced focus was put on the relationship of times on base and run scoring by early SABR-era baseball statistical pioneers.

SA and OBP were combined to create the modern statistic on-base plus slugging (OPS). OPS is the sum of the on-base percentage and the slugging percentage. This modern statistic has become useful in comparing players and is a powerful method of predicting runs scored by any given player. An enhanced version of OPS, "OPS+", incorporates OPS, historic statistics, ballpark considerations, and defensive position weightings to attempt to allow player performance from different eras to be compared.

Some other advanced metrics used to evaluate batting performance are weighted on-base average, secondary average, runs created, and equivalent average.

=== Pitching measurements ===
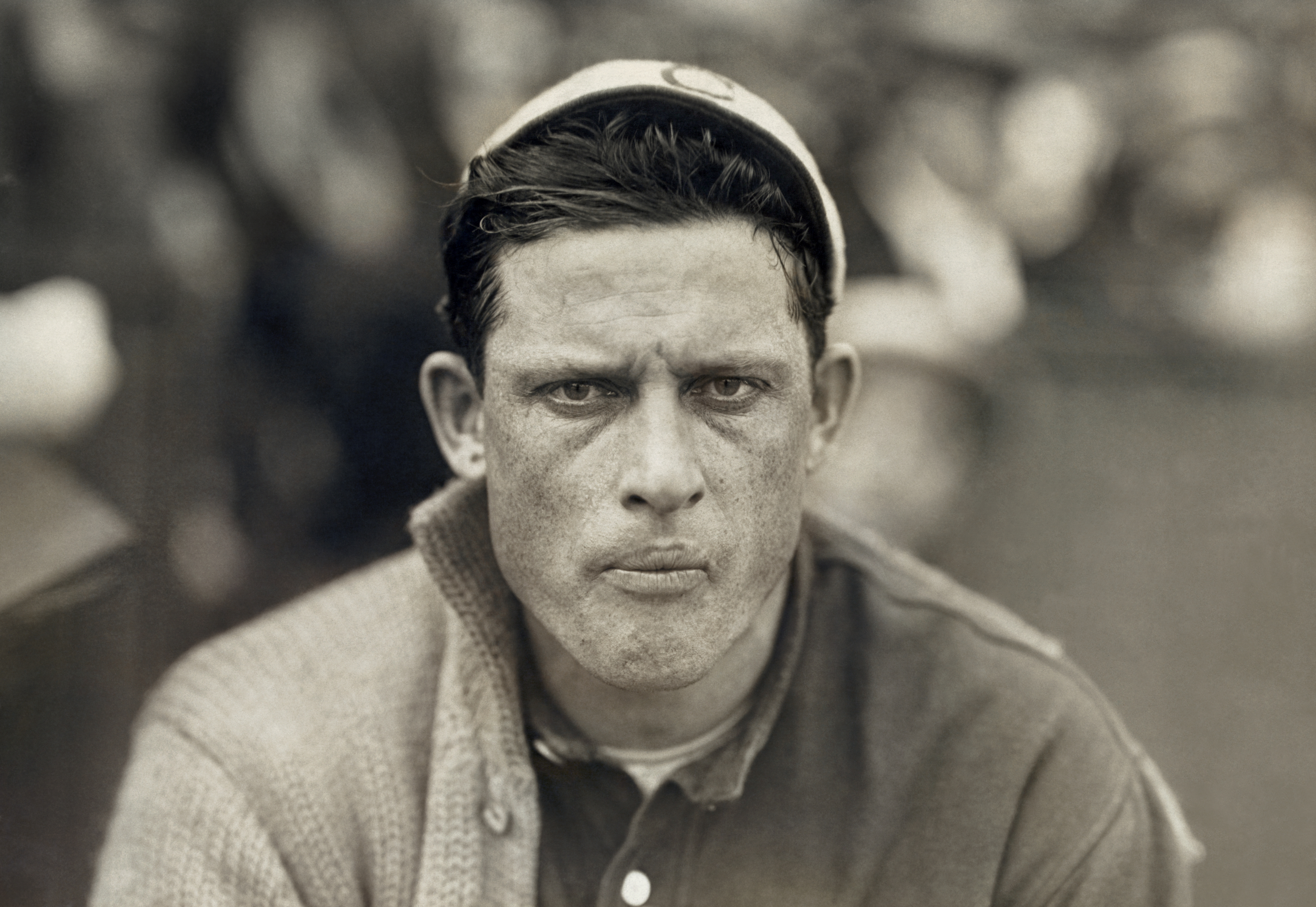
Ed Walsh, whose career 1.82 ERA is the lowest in MLB history

The traditional measure of pitching performance is the earned run average (ERA). It is calculated as earned runs allowed per nine innings. Earned run average does not separate the ability of the pitcher from the abilities of the fielders that he plays with. Another classic measure for pitching is a pitcher's winning percentage. Winning percentage is calculated by dividing wins by the total number of decisions (wins plus losses). Winning percentage is also heavily dependent on the pitcher's team, particularly on the number of runs it scores.

Sabermetricians have attempted to find different measures of pitching performance that exclude the performances of the fielders involved. One of the earliest developed, and one of the most popular in use, is walks plus hits per inning pitched (WHIP), which while not completely defense-independent, tends to indicate how many times a pitcher is likely to put a player on base (either via walk, hit-by-pitch, or base hit) and thus how effective batters are against a particular pitcher in reaching base.

A later development was the creation of defense independent pitching statistics (DIPS) system. Voros McCracken has been credited with the development of this system in 1999. Through his research, McCracken was able to show that there is little to no difference between pitchers in the number of hits they allow on balls put into play – regardless of their skill level. Some examples of these statistics are defense-independent ERA, fielding independent pitching, and defense-independent component ERA. Other sabermetricians have furthered the work in DIPS, such as Tom Tango who runs the Tango on Baseball sabermetrics website.

Baseball Prospectus created another statistic called the peripheral ERA. This measure of a pitcher's performance takes hits, walks, home runs allowed, and strikeouts while adjusting for ballpark factors. Each ballpark has different dimensions when it comes to the outfield wall so a pitcher should not be measured the same for each of these parks.

Batting average on balls in play (BABIP) is another useful measurement for determining pitchers' performance. When a pitcher has a high BABIP, they will often show improvements in the following season, while a pitcher with low BABIP will often show a decline in the following season. This is based on the statistical concept of regression to the mean. Others have created various means of attempting to quantify individual pitches based on characteristics of the pitch, as opposed to runs earned or balls hit.

== Advanced methods ==
Value over replacement player (VORP) was once considered a popular sabermetric statistic. This statistic attempts to demonstrate how much a player contributes to his team in comparison to a hypothetical player performing at the minimum level needed to hold a roster position on a major league team. It was invented by Keith Woolner, a former writer for the sabermetric group/website Baseball Prospectus.

Wins above replacement (WAR) is another popular sabermetric statistic for evaluating a player's contributions to his team. Similar to VORP, WAR compares a given player to a replacement-level player in order to determine the number of additional wins the player provides to his team relative to an average ballplayer at his position. WAR, like VORP, is a cumulative statistic, heavily reflects the amount of a player's playing time.

"Static" statistics based on simple ratios of already accumulated data (like batting average) and accumulative tallies (such as pitching wins) do not fully reveal all aspects of the game represented in their numeric totals. Advanced metrics are increasingly developed and targeted to addressing in-game activities (such as when a team should attempt to steal a base, and when to bring closers in).

== Applications ==
Sabermetrics are commonly used for everything from sportswriting to baseball Hall of Fame consideration, selecting player match-ups and evaluating in-game strategic options. Advanced statistical measures may be utilized in determining in-season and end-of-the-season awards (such as Player of the Week and MVP). Those which are most useful in evaluating past performance and predicting future outcomes are valuable in determining a player's contributions to his team, potential trades, contract negotiations, and arbitration.

Recently, sabermetrics has been expanded to examining ballplayer minor league performance in AA and AAA ball in a manner similar to evaluating it at the Major League level, known as Minor-League Equivalency.

== Advancements since 1985 ==
Bill James' two books, The Bill James Historical Baseball Abstract (1985) and Win Shares (2002) have continued to advance the field of sabermetrics. The work of his former assistant Rob Neyer, who later became a senior writer at ESPN.com and national baseball editor of SBNation, also contributed to popularizing sabermetrics since the mid-1980s.

Nate Silver, a former writer and managing partner of Baseball Prospectus, invented PECOTA (Player Empirical Comparison and Optimization Test Algorithm) in 2002–2003, introducing it to the public in the book Baseball Prospectus in 2003. It assumes that the careers of similar players will follow a similar trajectory.

Beginning in the 2007 baseball season, MLB started looking at technology to record detailed information regarding each pitch that is thrown in a game. This became known as the PITCHf/x system, which uses video cameras to record pitch speed at its release point and crossing the plate, location, and angle (if any) of a break.

In 2015, MLB introduced Statcast, which utilizes high speed cameras to track and quantify swings, pitches, and batted balls in all stadiums.

Statcast has benefited a lot of baseball teams by helping them collect more information on how their players are performing during games. Different cameras and tracking technology help measure players' launch angle, exit velocity, bat speed, and sprint speed. Exit velocity measures how fast the ball is traveling after contact is made, and launch angle measures the angle of the ball when it is leaving the bat. These two specific measurements allow teams to see how well a certain player is making contact with the baseball. Statcast also looks at advanced statistics like expected batting average (xBA) and expected weighted on-base average (xwOBA). These measurements show how successful a player is based on their contact quality. The use of technology gives teams more ways to be successful and evaluate how their team is doing beyond just looking at the total number of stolen bases, home runs, and hits.

FanGraphs is a website that utilizes this information and other play-by-play data to publish advanced baseball statistics and graphics.

== In popular culture ==
- Moneyball, the 2011 film about Billy Beane's use of sabermetrics to build the Oakland Athletics. The film is based on Michael Lewis's book of the same name.
- In the television show Numb3rs, the season 3 episode "Hardball" focuses on sabermetrics, and the season 1 episode "Sacrifice" also covers the subject.
- "MoneyBART", the third episode of The Simpsons' 22nd season, in which Lisa utilizes sabermetrics to coach Bart's Little League Baseball team.

== See also ==
- Analytics in ice hockey, the ice hockey equivalent
- Advanced statistics in basketball, the basketball equivalent
- Fielding Bible Award
- Kyle Boddy, founder of Driveline Baseball
- Statcast
- The Hardball Times
- Theorycraft
- Total Baseball by John Thorn and Pete Palmer
- Whatever Happened to the Hall of Fame? by Bill James
