= Theorycraft =

Mathematical analysis of game mechanics

Theorycraft (or theorycrafting) is the mathematical analysis of game mechanics (usually in video games) to discover optimal strategies and tactics. Theorycraft involves analyzing statistics, hidden systems or underlying game code in order to glean information that is not apparent during normal gameplay. Theorycraft is similar to analyses performed in sports or other games such as baseball's sabermetrics. The term has been said to come from StarCraft players as a portmanteau of "game theory" and "StarCraft".

Theorycraft is prominent in competitive gaming (such as multiplayer games, speedrunning and racing events), where players attempt to gain competitive advantage by analyzing game systems. As a result, theorycraft can lower barriers between players and game designers. Game designers must consider that players will have a comprehensive understanding of game systems and players can influence design by exploiting game systems and discovering dominant or unintended strategies.

Theorycrafting proven to be potent usually finds inclusion in the metagame. Theorycrafting knowledge is often communicated through online communities.

The way players theorycraft varies from game to game but often games under the same genres will have similar theorycrafting methods. Communities develop standardized ways to communicate their findings, including use of specialized tools to measure and record game data; terminology; and simulations to represent certain data.

The term theorycraft can be used in a pejorative sense. In this sense, "theorycraft" refers to naïve or impractical theorizing that would not succeed during actual gameplay.

== See also ==
- Econometrics
- Reverse engineering
