= Statcast =

Statistical analysis tool developed for and used by Major League Baseball

Statcast is an automated tool developed to analyze player movements and athletic abilities in Major League Baseball (MLB).

Statcast was introduced to all thirty MLB stadiums in 2015. The Statcast brand is also licensed to ESPN, which uses it to brand alternate statistical simulcasts of the network's games on ESPN2 and ESPN+.

== Usage ==
Each MLB organization now has an analytics team, using Statcast data to gain a competitive advantage. Clubs are unwilling to disclose exactly how they are using the data, engaging in an "arms race" of data analysis. This "arms race" of new data that is becoming available from Statcast is a rapidly growing field within Major League Baseball teams and can be identified as the "analytics" group. This is just another way teams are attempting to gain a competitive edge amongst each other.

Player accounts suggest Statcast data has replaced traditional metrics. For example, on the first day of spring training, Tampa Bay Rays hitters are told they will be measured by batted-ball exit velocity, not batting average. Also, Kris Bryant credits his improved performance in 2016 with changes he made in the off-season to adjust the launch angle of his hits.

Statcast data can be used to prevent injuries by tracking physical performance metrics through the course of the season. Data can also be extended to team performance metrics. For example, analysts can chart a defensive team's ability to throw runners out at home from various points on the field, accounting for relay throw efficiency and speed. A third base coach armed with this information should have a heightened degree of situational awareness, which ultimately affects their decision to hold a runner at third or send them home. This should reduce the number of runners needlessly cut down at home; but one must also take into account the fact that this information may lead to overly cautious decisions during situations when the reward outweighs the risks.

MLBAM also has a team of analysts that peruse the data and figure out what it means. This provides an additional resource for teams, resulting in queries from front office executives and even players.

Broadcasters use Statcast to showcase player talents. The Statistics page on MLB.com now lists Statcast superlatives alongside the traditional hitting, pitching, and fielding metrics.

== History ==
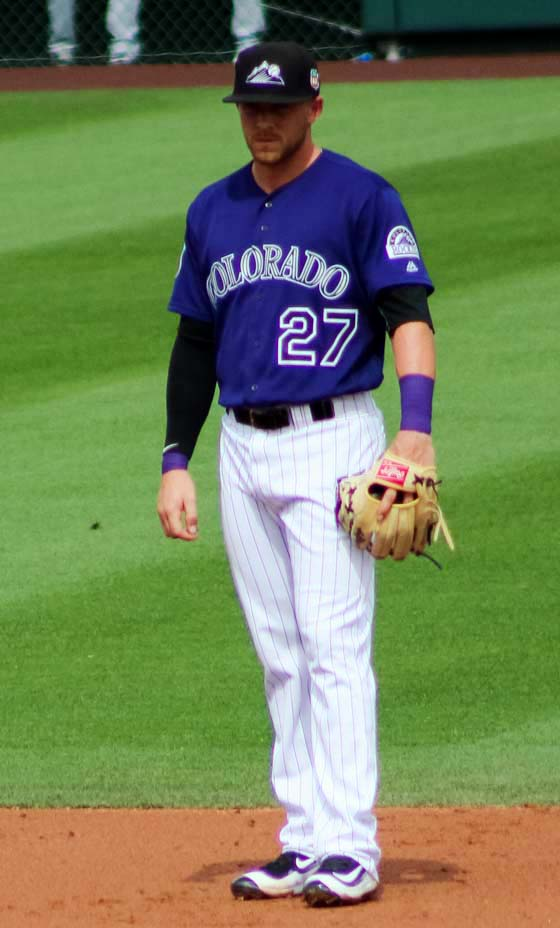
Trevor Story's 518-foot home run of July 12th, 2021, is the longest measured by Statcast.

The PITCHf/x system, first used in the 2006 MLB postseason, is a camera-based system that can measure the trajectory, speed, spin, break, and location of a pitched ball. This provides objective data that can be used in combination with statistical outcomes to better predict the effectiveness of a pitcher or batter. This system was one of the first pieces of new baseball technology to just scrape the surface of being able to objectively quantify new metrics for how the baseball is moving in space.

Statcast was first unveiled at the MIT Sloan Sports Analytics Conference. It won the Alpha Award for best Analytics Innovation/Technology at the 2015 conference. The system saw limited use during the 2014 MLB season, as it was tested in three stadiums. It was installed in all 30 Major League ballparks beginning with the 2015 season. This technology integrates doppler radar and high definition video to measure the speed, acceleration, and other aspects for every player on the field.

In the 2016 season, MLB Network aired "MLB Plus" companion broadcasts for its MLB Network Showcase games, which feature advanced analytics and usage of Statcast data.

For the 2017 season, the TrackMan component of Statcast replaced the previous PITCHf/x system for official measurements of pitch speed. As official pitch speed readings are now based on maximum velocity (typically from the release of the pitch), rather than the speed measured 55 feet from home plate, there have been notable discrepancies in pitch speed reports between those reported in 2016 and 2017, with some pitches registering slightly higher speeds than with the previous system.

In 2017, Statcast won a Technology & Engineering Emmy Award.

== Terminology ==
These are the relevant terms and definitions for Statcast output data.

Pitching

- Release: Measures the time from pitcher's first movement out of the stretch to the release point of the pitch.
- Extension: Measures the distance of the release point of the pitch from the front edge of the pitching rubber.
- Velocity: Measures the peak velocity of a pitch at any point from its release to the front edge of home plate.
- Perceived velocity: Velocity of the pitch at the release point normalized to the average release point for MLB pitchers. For example, a 90-mph pitch at a 54-inch release point will seem slower to the batter than a pitch of the same velocity thrown from a 56-inch release point.
- Spin rate: Measures the rate of spin by revolutions per minute of the ball at the point of the release from the pitcher's hand.

Hitting

- Exit velocity: Velocity of the ball off the bat on batted balls.
- Launch angle: The vertical angle at which the ball leaves the bat on a batted ball.
- Vector: Classifies the horizontal launch direction of the batted ball into five equal zones of 18 degrees each.
- Hang time: Measures the time from bat contact to the ball either hitting the ground/wall or contact by a fielder.
- Hit distance: Calculates the distance on the ground of the actual landing point of any ball hit into play, ground/wall or contact with fielder, regardless of outcome.
- Projected HR distance: Calculates the distance of projected landing point at ground level on over-the-fence home runs.

Baserunning

- Lead distance: Measures the distance between the base and the runner's center of mass at the time the pitcher goes into his windup on a pitch or pickoff attempt.
- Secondary lead: Measures the distance between the base and the runner's center of mass when the ball is released by the pitcher on a pitch or pickoff attempt.
- First step: Measures the time elapsed from time of bat-on-ball contact to the runner's first movement toward next base.
- Stealing first step: Measures the time elapsed from the pitcher's first movement in the stretch to the runner's first movement toward the next base on a steal attempt.
- Acceleration: Measures the time elapsed from time of bat-on-ball contact to the runner's max speed at any point ball is in play.
- Max speed: Measures the maximum speed at any point for all players while the ball is in play.
- Dig speed: Measures the time from bat-on-ball contact to the point where the batter-as-runner reaches first base on an infield ground ball.
- Extra bases: Measures the time of bat-on-ball contact to the point the runner advances an "extra" base (first to third or home, or second to home) on all hits (excluding over-the-fence home runs).
- Home run trot: Measures the time elapsed from time of bat-on-ball contact to the point where the batter-as-runner reaches home plate on home runs.

Fielding

- First step: Measure the time elapsed from time of bat-on-ball contact to the fielder's first movement toward the ball.
- First step efficiency: Measures the angle of deviation from a straight line to the ending point of a batted ball trajectory vs. the actual initial path taken toward the ball.
- Max speed: Measures the maximum speed at any point while tracking any ball hit into play.
- Acceleration (outfield): Measures the time elapsed from time of bat-on-ball contact to max speed at any point while pursuing any ball hit into the outfield.
- Total distance: The total distance covered from batted ball contact to fielding the ball.
- Arm strength: Measures the maximum velocity of any throw made by any fielder.
- Exchange: Measures the time from the point a fielder receives the ball to releasing a throw.
- Pop time: Measures the time elapsed from a pitch reaching catcher's glove, to throw, to receipt of the ball by fielder at the intended base on all pickoff throws and steal attempts.
- Pivot: Measures the time elapsed between receipt of the ball and release of throw on double-play attempts.
- Route efficiency (outfield): Divide the distance covered by the fielder by a straight-line distance between the player's position at batted ball contact and where the ball was fielded.

== Technology ==
The Statcast system uses two cameras to replicate the binocular vision of the human eye. Together, the cameras provide depth perception to easily distinguish between bodies on the field. The radar system measures the data, such as the speed and route of the players on the field. By combining the camera and radar data, dozens of physical metrics relating to every aspect of the game (pitching, hitting, baserunning, and fielding) can be obtained.

For a typical Major League baseball game, Statcast generates roughly seven terabytes of data. As the intent of the system is to emphasize player superlatives, impress fans and provide player evaluation abilities to teams, much of the data in a typical game is not useful outside averaging purposes. Computers parse through the data to extract the most interesting plays.

As Major League Baseball Advanced Media CEO Bob Bowman explains "We’ve been in the tech business for 13, 14 years. Job 1 is to get what’s in front of us out clearly, quickly, and accurately. That’s a big task, and it’s not going to happen overnight. What’s the 2.0 version of this? We don’t necessarily have a clear view of what 2.0 looks like. We’ve come to believe that while the unexpected can come back to haunt you, the unplanned isn’t bad. We’ll put stuff out, see what people like, then figure out what we want 2.0 to look like."

Statcast uses Google Cloud as its cloud data and analytics partner, switching from original partner Amazon Web Services in 2020. Hawk-Eye Innovations provides the high-speed cameras for Statcast in MLB stadiums.

== Records ==
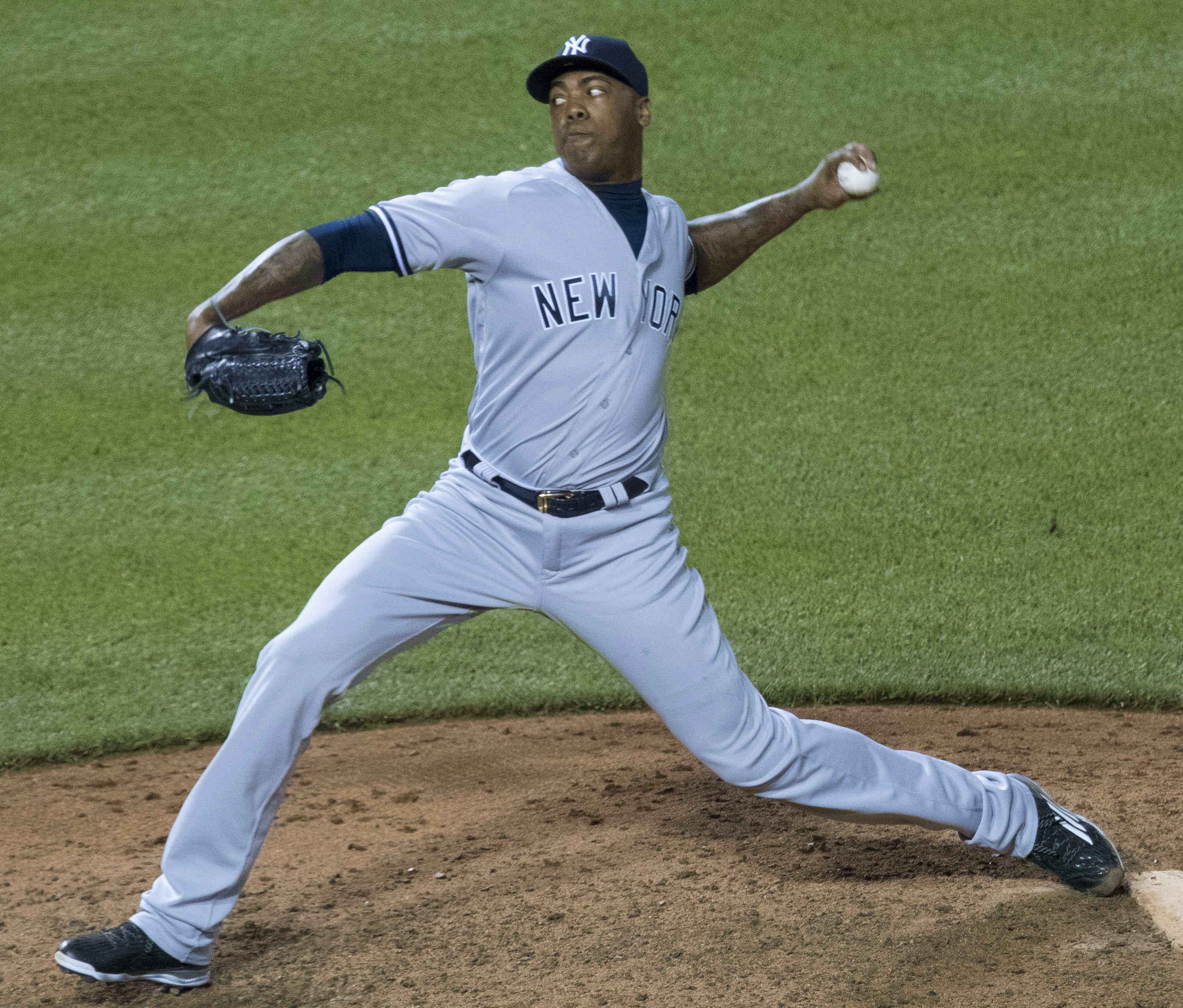
Aroldis Chapman threw MLB's fastest pitch per Statcast, 105.1 miles per hour, in July 2016.

Nomar Mazara hit a 505-foot (154 m) home run with the Texas Rangers to set the record for the longest distance measured by Statcast in the major leagues. Leandro Cedeño hit a home run measured at 527 feet (161 m) in the minor leagues. Giancarlo Stanton recorded the hardest hit batted ball, with a ground ball with a recorded 123.9-mile-per-hour (199.4 km/h) exit velocity, and the then longest distance for a home run, at 504 feet (154 m), measured by Statcast. On August 9, 2018, in a game against the Texas Rangers, Stanton hit a home run with an exit velocity of 121.7 miles per hour (195.9 km/h), the fastest exit velocity for a home run measured by Statcast, surpassing the previous record of 121.1 miles per hour (194.9 km/h) held by Aaron Judge. Aaron Hicks registered the fastest throw recorded by Statcast, at 105.5 miles per hour (169.8 km/h).

Aroldis Chapman set the record for fastest pitch recorded by Statcast at 105.1 miles per hour (169.1 km/h) in July 2016, tying his own record from 2010 for the fastest recorded pitch in MLB history. Through August 2015, Chapman had registered the 101 fastest pitches thrown in MLB, leading Statcast to introduce a filter to remove Chapman from custom leaderboards. In 2018, St. Louis Cardinals pitcher Jordan Hicks tied Chapman's record (105.1 mph) with a sinker against Odúbel Herrera of the Philadelphia Phillies.

== Umpire analysis ==
Players are not the only ones being reviewed by Statcast. Umpires have their calls behind the plate graded by the pitch-tracking technology that can compare the proper strike zone to the actual calls that were made on the field. With these developments, MLB umpires are more easily critiqued by players and fans alike. This not only allows for players and fans to more easily critique umpires more effectively, but allow teams to understand what umpires' tendencies are when making calls, further increasing the competitive advantage gap.

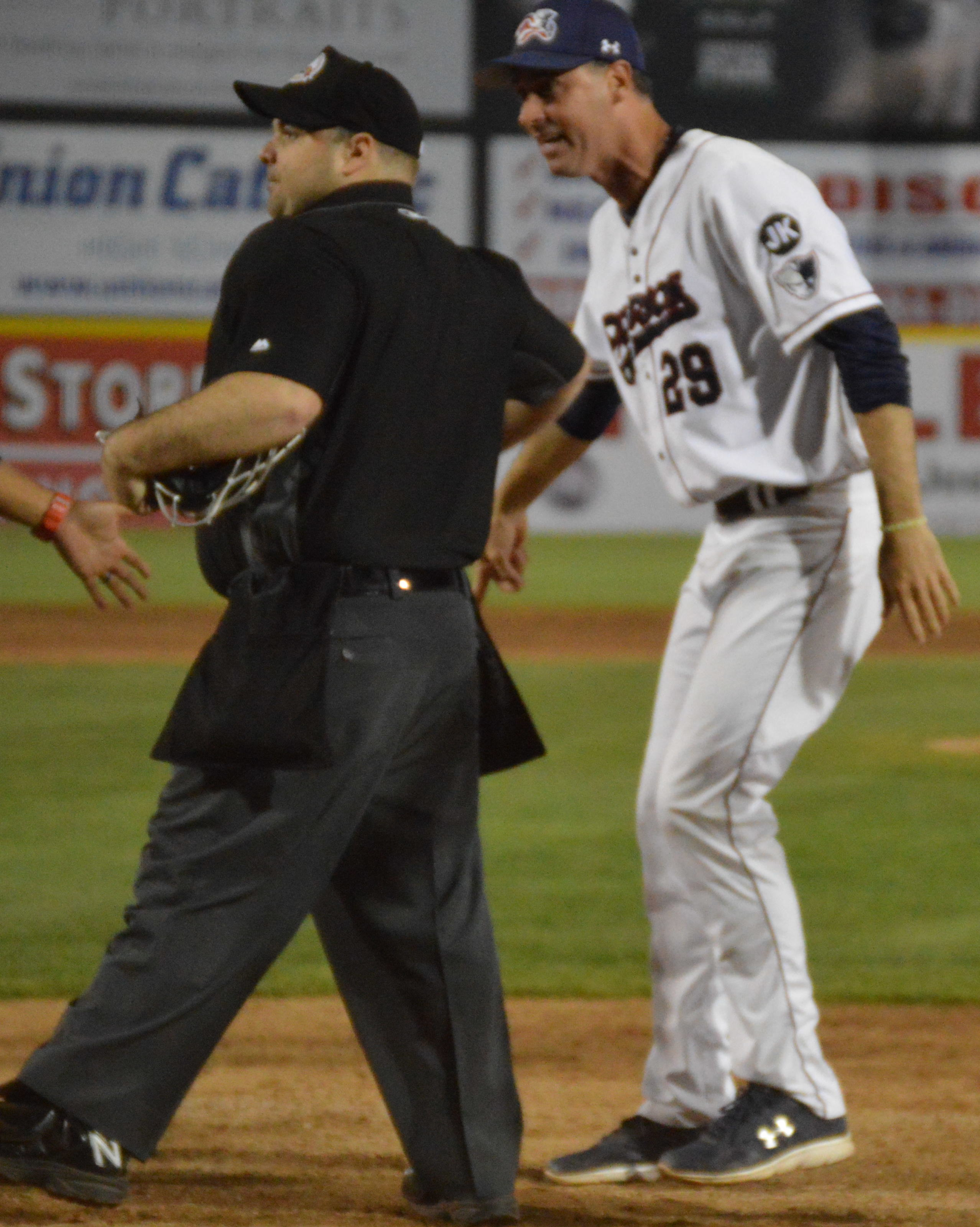
Somerset Patriots manager Brett Jodie and other personnel argue with the home plate umpire during a 2018 game in New Jersey.

A study conducted by Hank Snowdon, a student at Claremont McKenna College, found evidence “that umpires made more advantageous calls when their race was the same as the person receiving the advantage.” Thanks to analytics collected with the help of Statcast, he gathered “the entirety of data from the pitch tracking era, which amounts to millions of pitches with data from 2008-2020,” creating one of the largest and most accurate studies to ever occur in MLB. “Thanks to Statcast...we know an astonishing amount about whether a given pitch should be called a ball or a strike to begin with,” says Robert Arthur of Baseball Prospectus. “That makes quantifying the errors much easier.”

The demographic that was being analyzed plays a role as well. During the years the data was pulled from, “roughly 90 percent of umpires were white in the studied time period, a severe lack of diversity relative to the league’s player base.” Based on the study's findings, “mistaken calls are about 0.3 percentage points more likely due to race effects.” “Snowdon estimates that umpires called about 18,000 pitches differently over the 13-year period of the study because of racial bias.”
