= PITCHf/x =

Pitch tracking system in baseball

PITCHf/x was a system created and maintained by Sportvision that tracks the speeds and trajectories of pitched baseballs. This system, which made its debut in the 2006 Major League Baseball (MLB) postseason, is installed in every MLB stadium. The data from the system was often used by broadcasters to show a visual representation of the pitch and whether or not a pitch entered the strike zone. PITCHf/x was also used to determine the type of pitch thrown, such as a fastball, curveball or slider. MLB used the data from PITCHf/x in its Zone Evaluation System used to grade and provide feedback to umpires. Sabermetric analysts note that umpire accuracy has improved after the technology was introduced to MLB.

In 2017, PITCHf/x was replaced by TrackMan, a component of Major League Baseball's Statcast platform.

== Usage ==
PITCHf/x was a system using three permanently mounted cameras in the stadium to track the speed and location of a pitched baseball from the pitcher's mound to home plate with an accuracy of better than one mile per hour and one inch. With PITCHf/x, statistics such as the pitcher with the fastest fastball, or the pitcher with the sharpest-breaking curve, etc., can be analyzed. It calculated the movement of pitches caused by the Magnus force.

The PITCHf/x data was used in MLB's online Gameday webcast to show the path and speed of each pitch, as well as the location with respect to the strike zone as the pitch crossed the front of home plate. Gameday presents two values from PITCHf/x to characterize the deflection of the pitch trajectory. The BRK quantity represents the amount of bend in the trajectory at its greatest distance from a straight line. A curveball will have a larger value of BRK than a fastball. The PFX quantity represents the deflection of the baseball due to the spin and drag forces from the path it would have taken under the influence of gravity alone. For example, a fastball would have a small value for BRK but a large value for the spin displacement PFX because of the rising action of the fastball caused by backspin. Conversely, a curveball or slider will have a significant break measurement, but lower spin displacement.

Major League Baseball Advanced Media, which owns the data used in Gameday, releases the data every day in XML format. Several privately owned websites display this information, often with sorting functions and visual displays.

According to University of Illinois professor Alan M. Nathan, the PITCHf/x system allows analysts to "record with unprecedented precision such quantities as the pitch speed and the location at home plate. But even more importantly, we have measures of quantities that we never had before. As a result, we now have new and novel ways to study the art of pitching."

PITCHf/x data is generally consistent across ballparks, but there have been instances of apparent discrepancies in the data gathered at certain ballparks. (For example, a pitcher's fastball speed might be 1–2 mph faster at home than on the road.) PITCHf/x uses algorithms to automatically classify every pitch by type, but these algorithms are imprecise.

For the 2017 season, PITCHf/x was deprecated and replaced by TrackMan, a component of Major League Baseball's Statcast platform.

== See also ==
- Sabermetrics
- Statcast
