= Trackman =

Radar system using Doppler technology for 3D tracking of a sports ball in motion

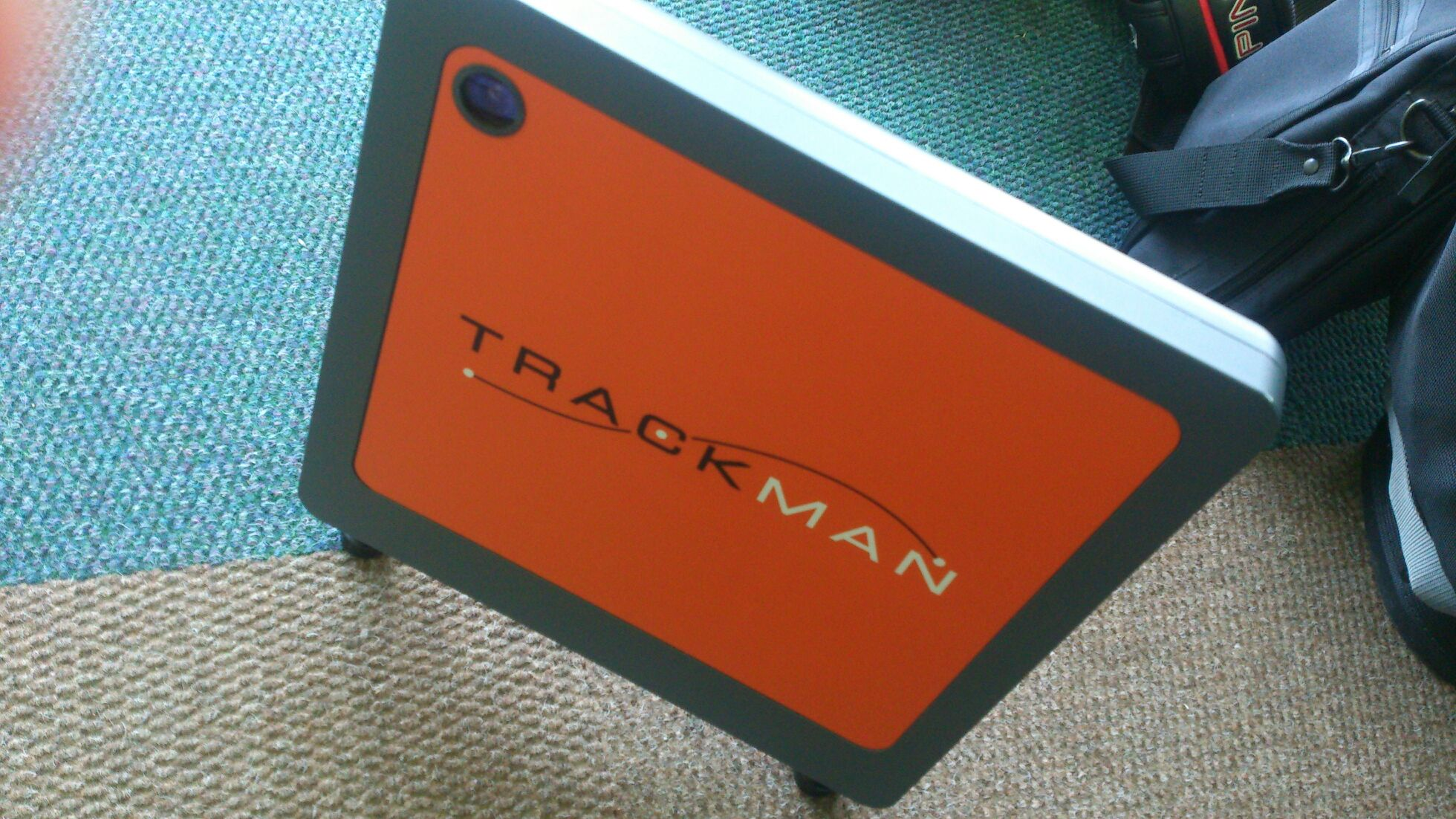
Trackman 3e launch monitor

The Trackman is a radar system that uses Doppler technology to track and record 3D characteristics of a sports ball in motion.

== History ==
Trackman was created in 2003 by golfers and brothers Klaus (CEO) and Morten Eldrup-Jørgensen and radar engineer Fredrik Tuxen (CTO). Tuxen worked with the tracking of bullets and missiles using Doppler radar. The Jorgensens contacted Tuxen to see if the technology could be used to track golf balls. The team developed the Trackman system and demonstrated it in the United States to five golf equipment manufacturers. Mizuno, Nike, Ping, Callaway, and TaylorMade became Trackman's first customers. Trackman products are sold worldwide to professionals, amateurs, and businesses. The company's headquarters is in Hørsholm, Denmark.

== Usage ==
=== Baseball ===
In 2015, Trackman was rolled out to all 30 MLB stadiums and more than 80 minor league ballparks. Major League Baseball uses Statcast, a system that uses cameras and radar to track and measure player and ball movements at all times. PITCHf/x, the previous pitch tracking system used by Statcast, was replaced by Trackman in 2017. PITCHf/x used high-speed cameras to measure the velocity of a baseball at 55 feet from home plate, where the ball may have already lost some speed. The Trackman uses Doppler radar to measure maximum velocity, which is defined at the release point of the pitch. The new technology led to reports of pitchers throwing slightly faster than they did in 2016.

=== Football ===
In 2019, the Chicago Bears became the first NFL team to incorporate the Trackman tracking system into their evaluation of field goal kickers. The technology was used during a highly scrutinized open competition to identify a replacement following the team’s season-ending missed field goal in the previous year's wild card playoff game.

=== Golf ===
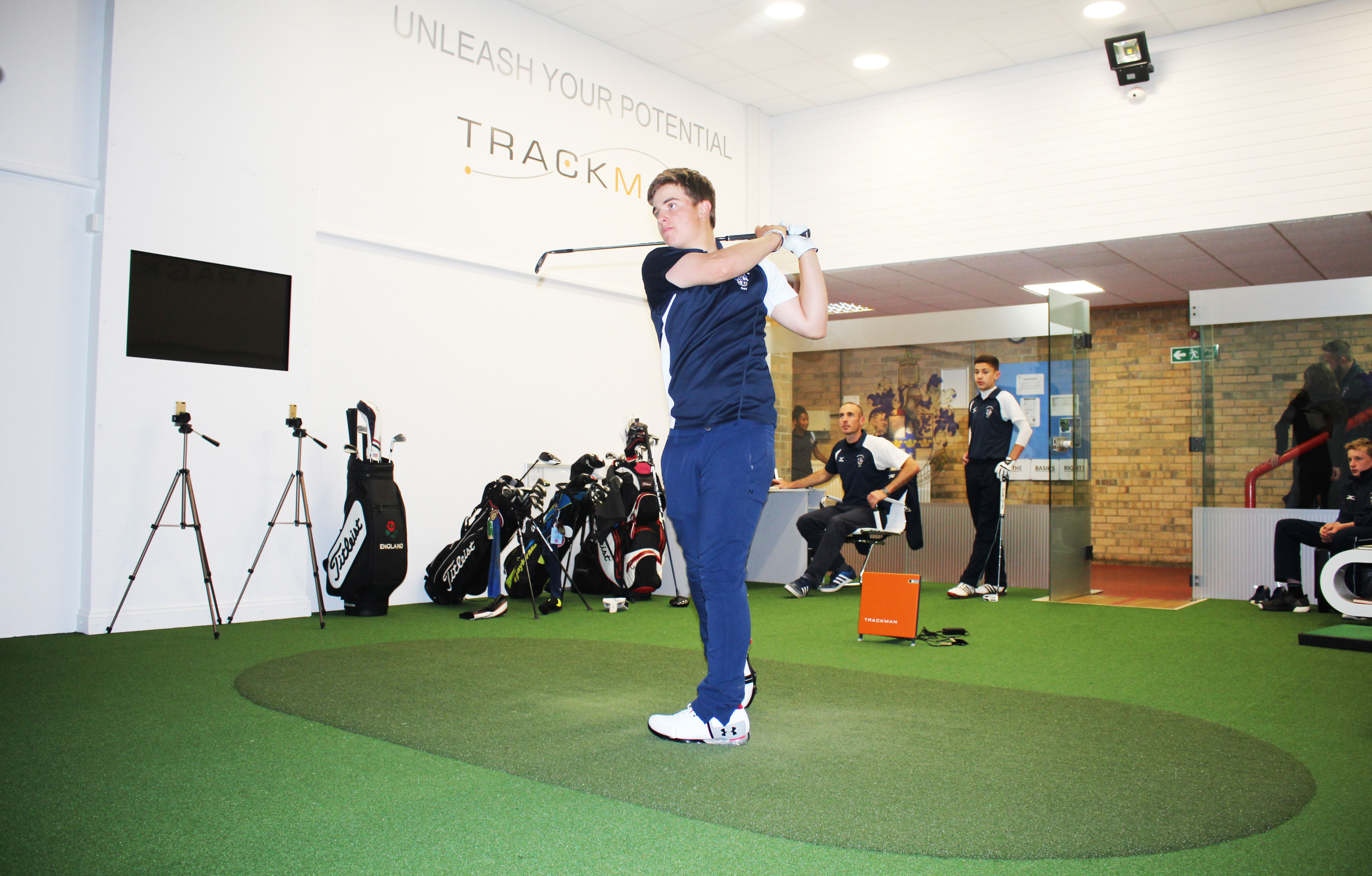
Indoor Golf Trackman Studio at Culford School in England

The Trackman is a device that uses Doppler radar to monitor the launch of a golf ball. It is set up behind the golfer and is roughly the size of a laptop. With each swing, it measures every aspect of the club movement, the trajectory of the ball, and its landing. It is equipped with a video camera so golfers can watch themselves while looking at information about their swing. Rather than calculating its projectile motion from initial launch parameters, it can track the entire flight of the ball from the moment of impact to the point where the ball comes to rest. After it finishes tracking, the Trackman displays data and graphics on the screen of a connected computer or smartphone. Users can compare their data to professional golfers or others with similar skills. The main advantage of using the device compared to traditional video analysis is that golfers get pure data instead of guessing everything from the video. Golfers and instructors use feedback from Trackman to practice and improve their performance on the golf course. It was first used on the PGA Tour in 2006. Television broadcasters also utilize it to display on-screen graphics such as the ball's trajectory as a golfer hits his or her tee shot.
