= Brittni Donaldson =

American basketball coach (born 1993)

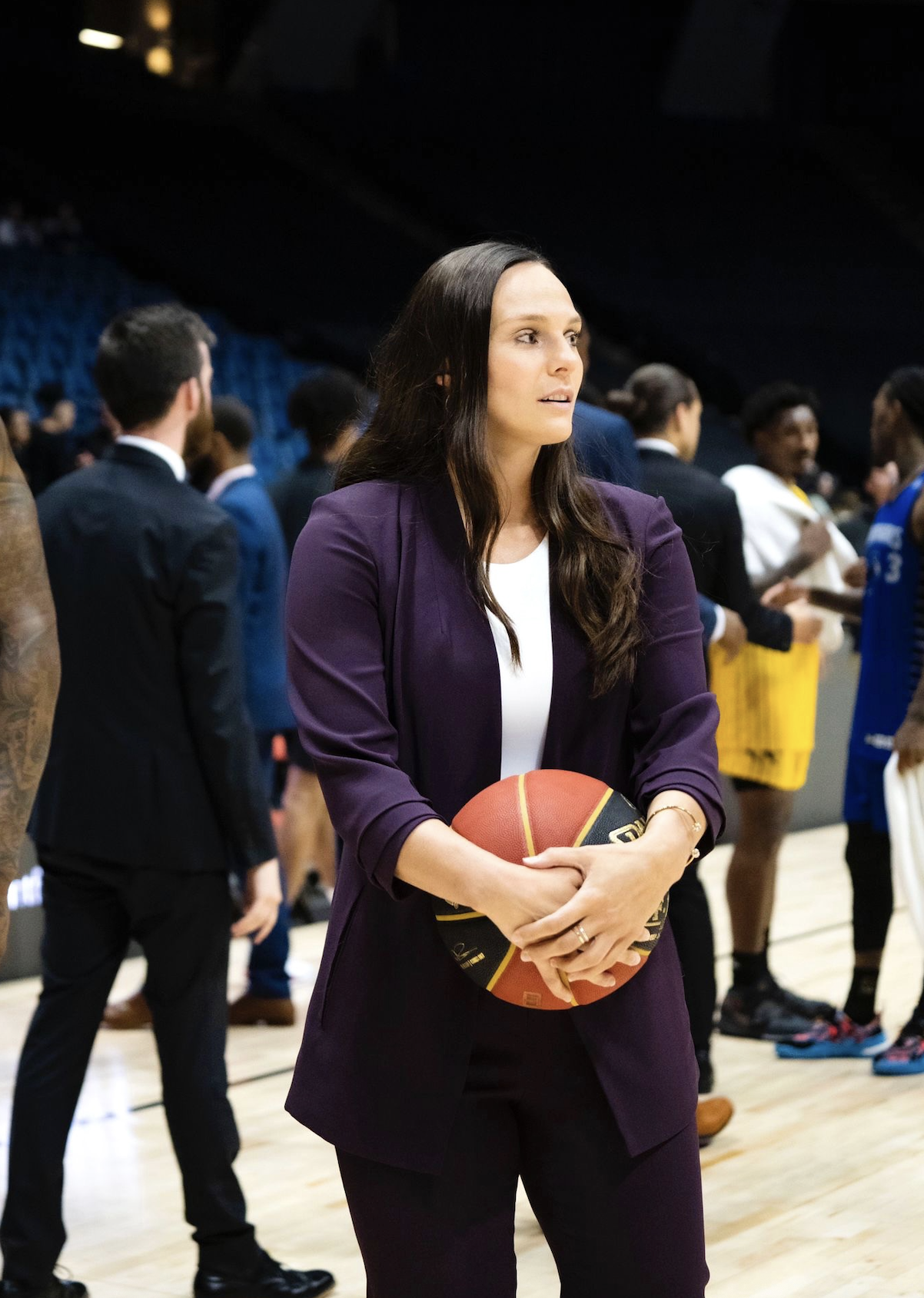
- Donaldson in 2022

Portland Fire
- Title: Assistant Coach and Assistant General Manager
- League: WNBA

Personal information
- Born: April 7, 1993 (age 33) Sioux City, Iowa, U.S.

Career information
- High school: Sioux City North High School
- College: Northern Iowa (2011–2015)
- Position: Point Guard / Shooting Guard
- Coaching career: 2019–present

Career history

Coaching
- 2019–2021: Toronto Raptors (assistant)
- 2021: Raptors 905 (assistant)
- 2022: Hamilton Honey Badgers (assistant)
- 2022–2023: Detroit Pistons (assistant)
- 2023–2025: Atlanta Hawks (assistant)
- 2026–present: Portland Fire (assistant)

Career highlights
- NBA Champion (2019); CEBL Champion (2022)

Brittni Donaldson (born April 7, 1993, in Sioux City, Iowa) is an assistant coach and assistant general manager for the Portland Fire of the Women's National Basketball Association. She previously served as an assistant coach for the Atlanta Hawks, Detroit Pistons, and Toronto Raptors, all of the National Basketball Association. While with the Pistons, she was also Director of Coaching Analytics. Donaldson was the first female coaching hire in franchise history for all four organizations.

== Career ==
Donaldson played college basketball for the Northern Iowa Panthers and graduated in 2015 with a degree in Statistics and Actuarial Sciences. Though she aspired to play professionally after college, a series of several knee operations left her sidelined for much of her time as an athlete and ultimately ended her playing career. Following that setback, she pivoted to data analytics as a way to merge her passion for sports with her academic foundation in statistics. She began working at STATS LLC as a SportVU Data Analyst, working extensively with basketball player tracking data. In 2017, she joined the Toronto Raptors’ front office as a Data Analyst.

After the Raptors won the 2019 NBA Finals, team president Masai Ujiri promoted Donaldson to the coaching staff, making her the 10th active female assistant coach in the NBA. At age 26, she was also the youngest active assistant coach in the league at the time.

During the shortened 2020–21 NBA G League season, Donaldson joined the Raptors 905 as a front-of-the-bench Assistant Coach, helping guide the team to a league-best 12–3 record and a semifinal appearance.

In 2021, Donaldson co-founded Strata Athletics, a player development startup focused on delivering data-informed, learning-based training to youth athletes. During the summer of 2022, she joined the Hamilton Honey Badgers of the Canadian Elite Basketball League as an Assistant Coach and Director of Coaching Development and helped guide the team to its first championship.

Donaldson returned to the NBA in 2022 with the Detroit Pistons as an Assistant Coach and Director of Coaching Analytics. In 2023, she was hired by the Atlanta Hawks as an Assistant Coach. After spending two seasons on the Hawks' coaching staff, she transitioned to a front office role as Director of Basketball Development, Methodology & Integration. In November 2025, she was hired by the Portland Fire as an Assistant Coach and Assistant General Manager.

Donaldson is known for working at the intersection of coaching, basketball analytics, and player development. She has spoken at several prominent conferences such as the MIT Sloan Sports Analytics Conference and FC Barcelona’s Sports Tomorrow Congress. She's also participated in several global clinics such as Giants of Africa and Basketball Without Borders.

== University of Northern Iowa statistics ==
Year	Team	GP	FG%	3PA/G	3P%	FT%	RPG	APG	SPG	PPG
2011-12	University of Northern Iowa	30	34.8%	2.6	29.1%	52.2%	1.5	0.7	0.4	4.4
2012-13	University of Northern Iowa	34	32.8%	3.5	32.2%	74.0%	1.9	0.9	0.4	6.1
2013-14	University of Northern Iowa	30	36.8%	4.4	34.8%	87.2%	1.8	2.2	0.4	7.4
2014-15	University of Northern Iowa	22	36.8%	2.0	33.3%	80.0%	1.3	0.8	0.0	3.0
Career		116	34.9%	3.2	32.6%	75.4%	1.7	1.2	0.3	5.4

== Personal life ==
Donaldson is the daughter of Jeff and Carmen Donaldson. Jeff is a former basketball star at Briar Cliff College and a member of the Iowa High School Athletic Association Basketball Hall of Fame. Carmen played softball and volleyball. Both parents grew up in Iowa.
