= Basketball in Africa =

- Governing body: FIBA Africa

International competitions
- AfroBasket (National Team); Basketball Africa League (Club basketball); Summer Olympics (National Team); FIBA World Cup (National Team)

Basketball is a rapidly growing sport on the continent of Africa. While its popularity is still dwarfed by association football, foreign investors, led by the National Basketball Association (NBA), are betting that it will be able to compete in the near future.

There are currently 16 African-born players in the National Basketball Association (NBA), including the league's Most Valuable Player, Joel Embiid.

== History ==
Men's basketball made its debut as a contested Olympic sport in Berlin, Germany in 1936. At this event, Egypt fielded a team, making it the first African nation to compete in Olympic basketball. In this tournament, Egypt finished outside of the medal places with a record of 1–3, with its sole win coming against Turkey by a score of 33–23.

Hakeem Olajuwon arrived from Nigeria in 1980 as an unheralded recruit to the University of Houston. Here, he emerged as a star, forming a duo with Clyde Drexler, that came to be known as "Phi Slamma Jamma," en route to back-to-back NCAA championship games. Olajuwon proceeded to be selected first overall in the 1984 NBA draft, ahead of Michael Jordan and would put together a career including back-to-back NBA championships in 1994 and 1995, the MVP award in 1994, and a selection to the Naismith Memorial Basketball Hall of Fame in 2008. Hakeem's popularity catalyzed the growth of basketball in Africa, akin to Yao Ming's impact on the game in China.

In 2019, the Toronto Raptors, featuring African players Pascal Siakam (Cameroon) and Serge Ibaka (Republic of the Congo), and general manager Masai Ujiri (Nigeria), defeated the Golden State Warriors to win the NBA title. The Raptors, under the guidance of Ujiri, the first and only African general manager in the NBA to this point, have since further invested in African talent to fill their lineup around two-time All-NBA player, Siakam. In the 2022–23 season, the Raptors featured eight African players on their roster.

In 2023, Philadelphia 76ers center from Yaoundé, Cameroon, Joel Embiid, was named NBA MVP after two consecutive seasons finishing as runner-up.

== Major influences ==
=== Hakeem Olajuwon ===
Hakeem Olajuwon, member of the Basketball Hall of Fame, two-time NBA Champion (1994 and 1995), 1994 MVP, and first overall pick in the 1984 NBA Draft, was born and raised in Lagos, Nigeria. His stardom catalyzed the NBA's interest in the continent as a future talent hot spot and bolstered African interest in the sport. As current CEO of NBA Africa Victor Williams put it, "Hakeem's example inspired so many other Africans to now start thinking of basketball as a career, as an opportunity, and inspired people in the NBA to think of Africa as a place where the game could grow." Speaking further to the role Olajuwon played in highlighting the pathway basketball could present to African prospects, Dikembe Mutombo, fellow Hall of Famer and an eight-time NBA All-Star from the Democratic Republic of the Congo, shared, "Hakeem is my idol. He inspired all of us. I think if Hakeem hadn't done it the way he did it, not many people would've followed. He opened that door. I talk about him being the king of Africa. He opened that door for us. He sat on that throne so we can follow."

Olajuwon, despite his Nigerian roots, opted to play for the United States in international competition at the senior level where he claimed a gold medal at the 1996 Olympic Games in Atlanta. He faced some criticism in Nigeria for this decision, to which he responded, "I've been [in the United States] over 10 years, my home is in Houston and a lot of family is in the United States. It was just natural. I'm still Nigerian and I'm proud of it, but I'm a U.S. citizen."

=== Masai Ujiri ===
Masai Ujiri, President of the Toronto Raptors, 2019 NBA Champion and 2013 NBA Executive of the Year, was raised in Zaria, Nigeria by Kenyan and Nigerian parents. After a brief stint playing professionally in Europe, Ujiri transitioned to scouting and eventually front office team management in the NBA. Ujiri is the first and only African general manager of a North American major league sports franchise. Outside of his role with the Raptors, Ujiri is actively involved in growing the sport of basketball in Africa through his Giants of Africa camps, which he co-founded with good friend Godwin Owinje in 2003. Giants of Africa began as a single camp in Nigeria and has since expanded to 15 countries across the continent, bolsters corporate sponsorships with the likes of Nike and 2K Foundations, and was subject of a 2016 film titled "Giants of Africa".

== Foreign Investment ==
=== NBA ===
The NBA, the world's premier professional basketball league, has led the way in investing in African basketball. The league has its own branch on the continent, named NBA Africa, under which its flagship investments are operated, these being the Basketball Africa League (BAL), the Basketball Without Borders elite camps, and the NBA Academy Africa in Saly, Senegal. The NBA Africa entity was officially established in May 2021, just over a decade after the NBA opened its African headquarters in Johannesburg, South Africa. It is currently led by CEO Victor Williams and was modeled on the highly successful NBA China entity, which is estimated to have a market value of $5 billion. Upon the launch of NBA Africa, NBA Commissioner Adam Silver set the value of the entity just shy of $1 billion, elaborating that "much of that valuation comes from the enormous optimism we see in this brand in Africa and our opportunity to bring content directly to the people of the many countries of Africa."

Partners with the NBA in its African ventures include former President of the United States Barack Obama, actor Forest Whitaker, author Dambisa Moyo, and former NBA players Luol Deng, Grant Hill, and Dikembe Mutombo.

The NBA's investment began in 2003 under former commissioner David Stern with the establishment of Basketball Without Borders, an elite camp for top local prospects. The league followed this up with the establishment of its headquarters in Johannesburg, South Africa in 2010, amidst the country's hosting of the World Cup. NBA Academy Africa, based in Saly, Senegal, opened in 2018 as an elite facility to streamline and professionalize development of the continent's most promising talents. Most recently, the NBA launched the BAL in collaboration with FIBA, which has become the premier club competition on the continent.

While the NBA's investment in African basketball has generally received a positive reception, the league was criticized for its decision to host the inaugural 2021 season of the BAL in a "bubble" environment in Kigali, Rwanda due to the COVID-19 pandemic. This bubble format mirrored that of the NBA in 2020, which finished its season at the Walt Disney World complex in Lake Buena Vista, Florida. This decision sparked global media backlash due to concerns over Rwandan president Paul Kagame's authoritarian leadership and questions surrounding his government's human rights record. Critics sought to portray the NBA in a hypocritical lens given the concurrent political stances the league took in 2020 in the United States in response to major police violence incidents: both the murder of George Floyd in Minneapolis and shooting of Jacob Blake in Kenosha, Wisconsin.

== Competitions ==
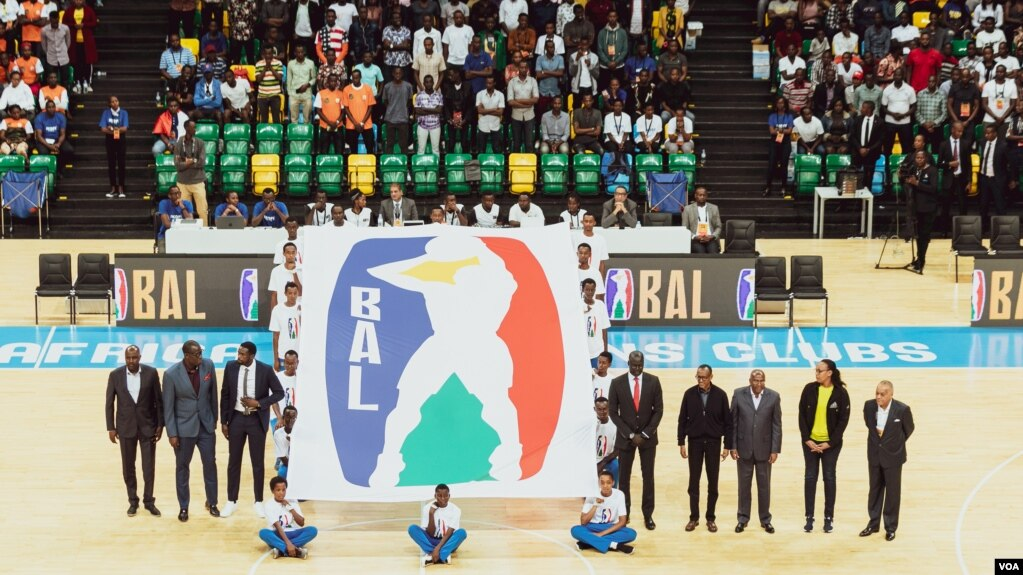
The BAL began play in 2021 in Kigali, Rwanda

=== Basketball Africa League (BAL) ===
Basketball Africa League (BAL), founded by the National Basketball Association (NBA) and International Basketball Federation (FIBA), kicked off its inaugural season in 2021. It is a continent-wide league, featuring 12 teams from different countries who compete in a group stage to determine seeding for a single-elimination tournament from which a champion is crowned. The BAL's model is in many ways analogous to association football's popular UEFA Champions League, which pits the best club teams across Europe against each other. In 2023, the BAL's games will be broadcast over to the NBA app to 214 countries and territories in seven languages.

The league has rules mandating a quota of at least eight players per team being citizens of the team's nation and restricting the number of non-African roster spots to two to ensure that African players are the face of the league. High-profile foreign players such as rapper J. Cole and Zaire Wade, son of Dwyane Wade, have appeared in the league, helping to bring a spotlight to the BAL in the United States.

=== Current Teams ===
- A.S. Douanes (Senegal)
- Abidjan Basketball Club (Ivory Coast)
- Al Ahly (Egypt)
- CFV Beira (Mozambique)
- Cape Town Tigers (South Africa)
- City Oilers (Uganda)
- Kwara Falcons (Nigeria)
- Petro De Luanda (Angola)
- R.E.G. (Rwanda)
- S.L.A.C. Basketball (Guinea)
- Stade Malien (Mali)
- U.S. Monastir (Tunisia)

=== Former Champions ===
- 2021: Zamalek (Egypt)
- 2022: U.S. Monastir (Tunisia)
- 2023: Al Ahly (Egypt)

=== Viewership ===
The 2022 iteration of the tournament was reported to have had over 50,000 attendees, highlighted by a sold-out crowd of 10,000 at BK Arena in Kigali, Rwanda for the matchup between U.S. Monastir and Petro De Luanda.

== Notable African Players ==
=== Current ===
- Udoka Azubuike (Nigeria)
- Bismack Biyombo (Democratic Republic of Congo)
- Bol Bol (South Sudan)
- Mamadi Diakite (Guinea)
- Gorgui Dieng (Senegal)
- Joel Embiid (Cameroon)
- Bruno Fernando (Angola)
- Wenyen Gabriel (South Sudan)
- Serge Ibaka (Republic of the Congo)
- Christian Kooloko (Cameroon)
- Josh Okogie (Nigeria)
- Pascal Siakam (Cameroon)

=== Former ===
- Manute Bol (South Sudan)
- Luol Deng (South Sudan)
- Dikembe Mutumbo (Democratic Republic of Congo)
- Hakeem Olajuwon (Nigeria
