= Bill Barnwell =

American sports journalist (born 1984)

- Born: William Jerome Barnwell Jr. July 5, 1984 (age 42)
- Education: Northeastern University (BA)
- Occupation: Journalist
- Writing career
- Years active: 2005–present
- Subject: Sports

William Jerome Barnwell Jr. is an American sportswriter and staff writer for ESPN.com. He has written about a wide range of sports including football, basketball, baseball, soccer, golf and mixed martial arts.

== Career ==
Barnwell began his sportswriting career while a student at Northeastern University as an intern for Football Outsiders, a football statistics and analysis website. He remained at Football Outsiders until 2011 when he was brought on to write at Grantland, a sports and pop-culture website started by Bill Simmons in affiliation with ESPN. At Grantland, Barnwell frequently wrote columns about the National Football League, including coverage and analysis of the NFL draft, free agency, salary cap, coaching strategy, rule changes, and prop bets. While at Grantland he also wrote about the NBA, UFC, Premier League and sabermetrics, and frequently appeared as a guest on The B.S. Report. Barnwell, along with fellow Grantland writer Robert Mays, hosted the Grantland NFL Podcast from August 2013 until October 2015, at which point ESPN announced that it was ending the publication of Grantland. Prior to Grantland's closure, the Grantland NFL Podcast missed several scheduled release dates over a period of two weeks without public explanation, leading to speculation that Barnwell and Mays may have been engaged in a dispute with interim editor Chris Connelly.

Regarding football analysis, Barnwell frequently cites a team's DVOA. While working at Football Outsiders, Barnwell developed a metric called Speed Score, which uses an individual football player's weight and 40-yard dash time at the NFL Scouting Combine to predict future performance. In fourth down situations, Barnwell has written that football teams are unlikely to be as aggressive as they should be, arguing that average win probability usually goes up when a team elects not to punt.

In 2015, he assumed full-time writing duties at ESPN.com.

== Personal life ==
Barnwell has written about his struggles with depression and body image. He lost 125 pounds in 2015.

He is a fan of the New York Giants, but acknowledges that he also "worships" Tom Brady.

He is an alumnus of Upright Citizens Brigade where he met his wife Erin. They have a dog Maggie and son Graham.

== Bibliography (selected) ==
- "Cashing In on the New Moneyball"
- "The Marriage of Stats and Football"
- "Leaving Las Vegas"
- "Nomentum, Part 1"
- "NFL Trade Value, Part 1"
