= Becky Hammon =

American basketball player and coach

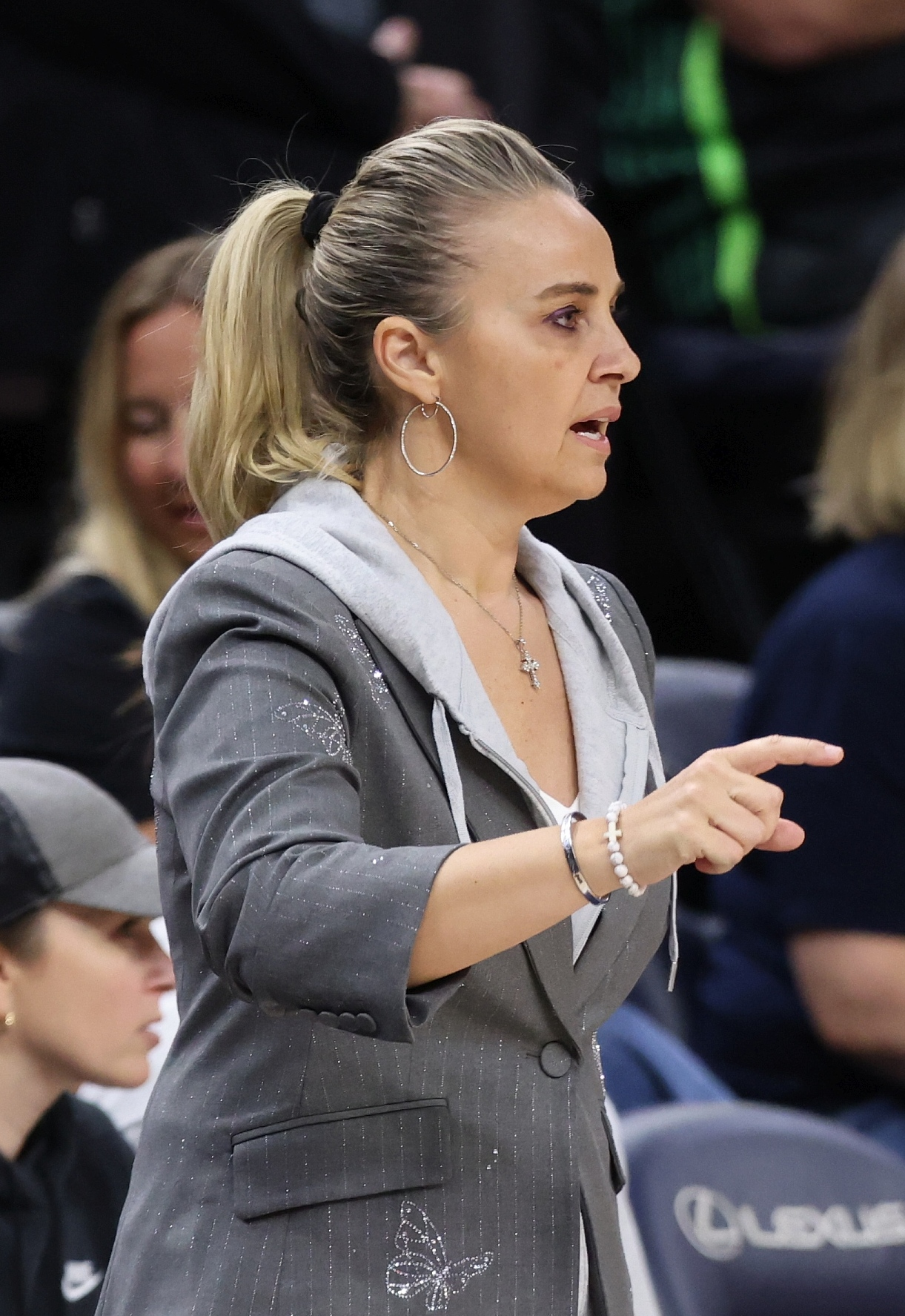
- Hammon coaching the Las Vegas Aces in 2025

Las Vegas Aces
- Title: Head coach
- League: WNBA

Personal information
- Born: March 11, 1977 (age 49) Rapid City, South Dakota, U.S.
- Listed height: 5 ft 6 in (1.68 m)
- Listed weight: 136 lb (62 kg)

Career information
- High school: Stevens (Rapid City, South Dakota)
- College: Colorado State (1995–1999)
- WNBA draft: 1999: undrafted
- Playing career: 1999–2014
- Position: Point guard
- Number: 25
- Coaching career: 2014–present

Career history

Playing
- 1999–2006: New York Liberty
- 2001–2002: Trentino Rovereto Basket
- 2006–2007: Rivas Ecópolis
- 2007–2014: San Antonio Stars
- 2007–2009: CSKA Moscow
- 2009–2010: Ros Casares Valencia
- 2010–2011: Nadezhda Orenburg
- 2011–2012: Spartak Moscow Region

Career highlights
- As player: 6× WNBA All-Star (2003, 2005–2007, 2009, 2011); 2× All-WNBA First Team (2007, 2009); 2× All-WNBA Second Team (2005, 2008); WNBA assists leader (2007); WNBA anniversary teams (15th, 20th, 25th); WNBA Three-Point Shootout champion (2009); WNBA Skills Challenge Champion (2007); No. 25 retired by San Antonio Stars/Las Vegas Aces; Spanish League champion (2010); Queen's Cup winner (2010); Frances Pomeroy Naismith Award (1996); First-team All-American – AP (1999); All-American – Kodak, USBWA (1999); 3× WAC Player of the Year (1997–1999); 4× First-team All-WAC (1996–1999); WAC Tournament MVP (1996); WAC Freshman of the Year (1996); WAC All-Freshman Team (1996); As head coach: 3× WNBA champion (2022, 2023, 2025); Commissioner's Cup champion (2022); WNBA Coach of the Year (2022); 3× WNBA All-Star Game coach (2022, 2023, 2026)
- Stats at WNBA.com
- Stats at Basketball Reference
- Basketball Hall of Fame
- Women's Basketball Hall of Fame
- Collegiate Basketball Hall of Fame
Medals
Representing United States
Jones Cup
Gold medal – first place	1998 Taipei	Team competition
Representing Russia
Olympic Games
Bronze medal – third place	2008 Beijing	National Team
EuroBasket
Silver medal – second place	2009 Latvia	Team competition

Rebecca Lynn Hammon (born March 11, 1977) is an American-Russian professional basketball coach and former player who is the head coach of the Las Vegas Aces of the Women's National Basketball Association (WNBA). She is considered one of the greatest players and coaches in WNBA history, and a pioneer for female coaches in the National Basketball Association (NBA).

Hammon played college basketball for the Colorado State Rams, where she was a three-time All-American and left as the program's all-time leader in points and assists. Despite being undrafted, she played 16 seasons in the WNBA, with the New York Liberty and the San Antonio Silver Stars. She was one of the league's premier ball-handlers and passers, earning six WNBA All-Star and four All-WNBA selections. A naturalized Russian citizen, Hammon played for the Russian national team, with whom she won a bronze medal at the 2008 Summer Olympics. She was inducted into the Basketball Hall of Fame for her playing career in 2023.

Hammon was hired by the San Antonio Spurs of the NBA in 2014, becoming the first female full-time assistant coach in a major American sports league. During her tenure with the Spurs, she became the first woman to serve as a head coach in the NBA Summer League or as an acting head coach during an NBA game. Hammon left the Spurs in 2021 to become the head coach of the Las Vegas Aces; she was the first WNBA coach to earn over $1 million per year. She transformed the Aces into a dynasty, winning three WNBA championships in her first four seasons and receiving the WNBA Coach of the Year award as a rookie head coach.

== Early life and education ==
Hammon was born in Rapid City, South Dakota. Hammon learned to dribble a basketball at a very young age, playing Nerf ball with her older brother and father, and continued to hone her skills on her home court. She was raised as a devout Christian.

Hammon played basketball at Stevens High School in her hometown of Rapid City, South Dakota. As a junior, she was named South Dakota Miss Basketball. As a senior, she was voted the South Dakota Player of the Year after averaging 26 points, 4 rebounds, and 5 steals per game. She graduated in 1995 and also was voted female class athlete by her graduating class.

Despite the accolades, she drew little attention from college basketball recruiters, who considered her too small and too slow. She eventually grabbed the attention of a Colorado State assistant coach, and she committed to the Rams.

== College career ==
Hammon's prolific scoring for the Colorado State Rams made her an All-American three times, as well as Colorado Sportswoman of the Year. She led her team to a 33–3 record in the 1998–99 season and helped them advance to the NCAA Tournament's Sweet Sixteen. She was named the WAC Mountain Division player of the year for the 1998–99 season and surpassed University of Utah player Keith Van Horn as the WAC's all-time leading scorer.

Hammon set many Colorado State all-time records, including points (2740), points per game (21.92), field goals made (918), free throws made (539), three-point field goals made (365) and assists (538). She received the Frances Pomeroy Naismith Award from the Women's Basketball Coaches Association as the best senior player under 5 ft 8 in (1.7 m) in 1999.

On November 12, 2004, Hammon was inducted into the Colorado State University Sports Hall of Fame. On January 22, 2005, her number 25 Colorado State jersey was retired at Moby Arena.

== Professional playing career ==
Undrafted during her rookie season, Hammon was signed to the WNBA on May 12, 1999, and joined the New York Liberty. She had a solid rookie season statistically, backing up starting point guard Teresa Weatherspoon. Her aggressive play at both ends of the court made her a favorite among Liberty fans. After the 2003 season, Hammon took over for Weatherspoon as the Liberty's starting point guard and, with Vickie Johnson and Crystal Robinson, became one of the team's co-captains in 2004.

In 2003, her first season with the Tennessee Fury of the National Women's Basketball League (NWBL), Hammon led the league in scoring, averaging 20.6 points per game. In 2004, Hammon signed with the Colorado Chill, a new team in the NWBL, but played in only two games because of an anterior cruciate ligament injury in her right knee sustained in the 2003 season when playing for the Liberty.

On August 16, 2005, Hammon scored her 2,000th WNBA career point. At the end of the 2005 season, she was named to the All-WNBA Second Team. In January 2007, she played her WNBA "off season" with Rivas Futura in the Spanish League.

On April 4, 2007, Hammon was traded to the WNBA's San Antonio Silver Stars. Hammon posted career high averages of 18.8 ppg (fourth best) and 5.0 apg in 2007. She led the league in assists that year. While in San Antonio, Hammon earned the nickname "Big Shot Becky" because of her ability to make shots in important moments. Her nickname was derived from "Big Shot Bob", a nickname given to San Antonio Spurs forward Robert Horry.

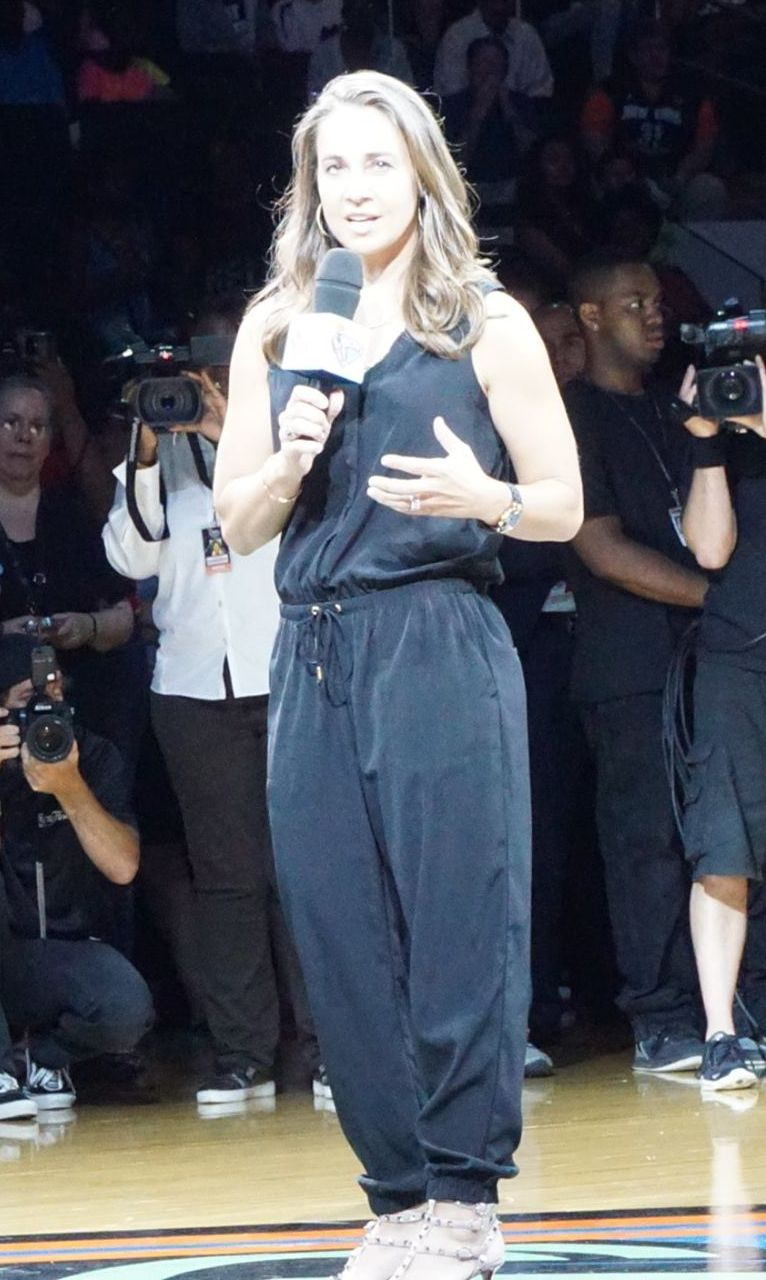
Becky Hammon speaking to the audience during her induction into the New York Liberty Ring of Honor in 2015

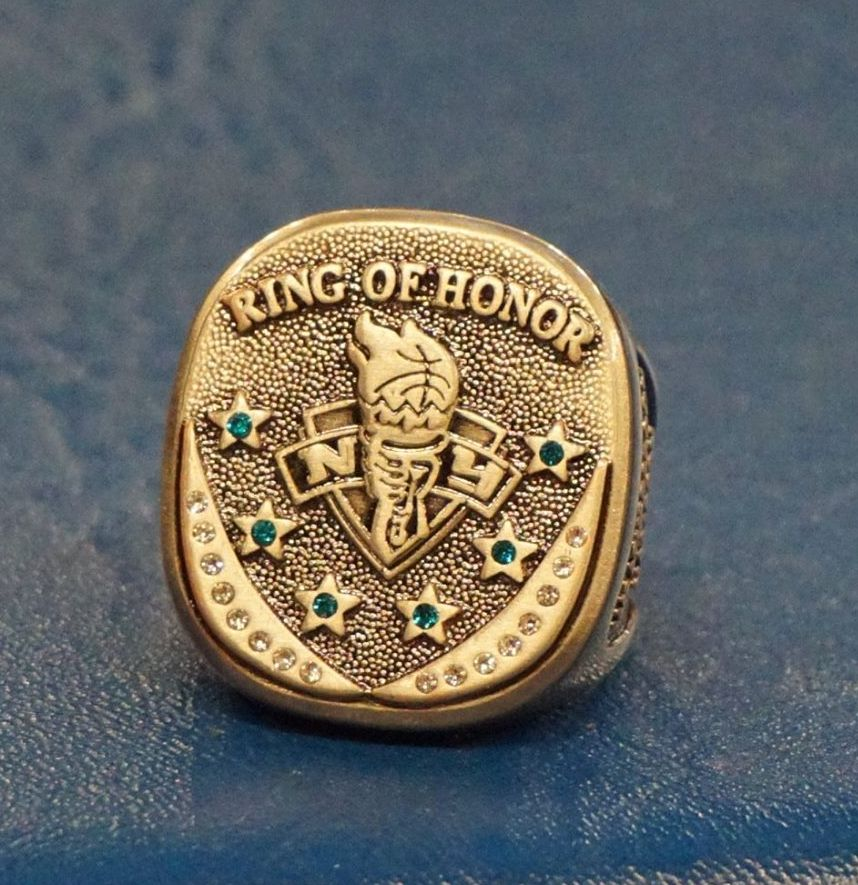
Replica of the Ring of honor awarded to Becky Hammon at her induction ceremony

In 2008, Hammon averaged 17.6 ppg, and 4.9 apg as she led the Silver Stars to a WNBA best record 24–10 and led them into the playoffs for a second straight year. In the conference semi-finals, Hammon scored 30 points in a Game 1 win against the Sacramento Monarchs. San Antonio would eventually win the series and advance to the Western Conference Finals. Following a loss in Game 1 and a win in Game 2, Hammon's 35 points propelled the Silver Stars to a victory in Game 3 against the Los Angeles Sparks. The Silver Stars advanced to the 2008 WNBA Finals, where they were defeated by the Detroit Shock 3–0.

Hammon averaged a career-high 19.5 ppg and 5.0 apg in the 2009 WNBA season. The Silver Stars had a record of 15–19 and lost to the eventual champion Phoenix Mercury in the first round. Hammon was an All-Star as well as a first-team All-WNBA selection. On August 31, 2011, Hammon became the seventh player in WNBA history to score 5,000 points. Later in the year, Hammon scored 37 points in a playoff-clinching win against the Los Angeles Sparks. Hammon retired from the WNBA in 2014. She is a six-time WNBA All-Star.

On August 2, 2015, Hammon was inducted into the Ring of Honor during halftime of the game between the New York Liberty and the Seattle Storm. The Ring of Honor recognizes players who have "made the most significant contributions to the Liberty's tradition of excellence and to the growth of the WNBA." Previous inductees include Vickie Johnson, Teresa Weatherspoon, Rebecca Lobo, Sue Wicks, and Kym Hampton.

On June 25, 2016, the San Antonio Stars retired Hammon's No. 25 jersey prior to the Atlanta Dream game.

== Coaching career ==
Hammon had long expressed aspirations of becoming a coach after her playing career ended. On July 13, 2013, Hammon tore her left anterior cruciate ligament in a game against the Los Angeles Sparks. During her year-long rehabilitation, Hammon attended the NBA's San Antonio Spurs' practices, coaches' meetings, and games, where she was frequently invited to contribute opinions.

=== San Antonio Spurs (2014–2021) ===
On August 5, 2014, Hammon was hired as an assistant coach for the Spurs as well as the second female coach, after Lisa Boyer worked as a volunteer assistant with the Cleveland Cavaliers and John Lucas in 2001. Hammon's contribution to the staff made an impression on head coach Gregg Popovich. In a media statement released at the time of the hiring announcement, Popovich stated: "I very much look forward to the addition of Becky Hammon to our staff. Having observed her working with our team this past season, I'm confident her basketball IQ, work ethic, and interpersonal skills will be a great benefit to the Spurs."

Hammon has also earned the respect of many NBA players throughout the league. One of basketball's most prolific scorers, Pau Gasol wrote an open letter about female coaches with an emphasis on Hammon; he said, "I've played with some of the best players of this generation … and I've played under two of the sharpest minds in the history of sports, in Phil Jackson and Gregg Popovich. And I'm telling you: Becky Hammon can coach. I'm not saying she can coach pretty well. I'm not saying she can coach enough to get by. I'm not saying she can coach almost at the level of the NBA's coaches. I'm saying: Becky Hammon can coach NBA basketball. Period."

Hammon has been inducted into the Colorado Sports Hall of Fame and has been selected as ESPNW's Woman of the Year.

On July 3, 2015, Hammon became the first female head coach in the NBA's Summer League when the Spurs announced she would coach their summer league team. Hammon led the Spurs to the Las Vegas Summer League title on July 20, 2015, becoming the first female NBA head coach to win a Summer League title.

At the 2016 NBA All-Star Game, Hammon became the first woman to be part of an All-Star coaching staff. On June 2, 2017, Hammon was interviewed for the position of general manager of the Milwaukee Bucks; she was not considered as a finalist for the position.

During her seventh season with the San Antonio Spurs, on December 30, 2020, Gregg Popovich was ejected in the second quarter of the Spurs' 121–107 loss to the Los Angeles Lakers, and Hammon became the first Russian and first female acting head coach in NBA history.

In 2021, Hammon was the first woman to be a finalist for an NBA head coaching position when she interviewed with the Portland Trail Blazers. The job went to Chauncey Billups.

=== Las Vegas Aces (2021–present) ===
Hammon was hired as the head coach for the Las Vegas Aces on December 31, 2021. In her first year as head coach, Hammon's Aces won the 2022 WNBA Finals and she became the first rookie head coach to win the WNBA title. The following season, the Las Vegas Aces repeated as 2023 WNBA champions, with Hammon becoming the first coach to win back-to-back WNBA titles in 20 years. Becky Hammon then lead the Aces to their third championship in 2025, sweeping the Phoenix Mercury.

On August 12, 2023, Hammon was inducted into the Naismith Basketball Hall of Fame for her contributions as a player and coach.

== Career statistics ==
Legend
GP	Games played	GS	Games started	MPG	Minutes per game	RPG	Rebounds per game
APG	Assists per game	SPG	Steals per game	BPG	Blocks per game	PPG	Points per game
TO	Turnovers per game	FG%	Field-goal percentage	3P%	3-point field-goal percentage	FT%	Free-throw percentage
**Bold**	Career best	°	League leader

‡	WNBA record

=== WNBA ===
==== Regular season ====
Year	Team	GP	GS	MPG	FG%	3P%	FT%	RPG	APG	SPG	BPG	TO	PPG
1999	New York	30	1	6.7	.422	.289	.882	.6	.6	.2	.0	**.8**	2.7
2000	New York	32	16	26.1	.472	.369	.884	2.0	1.8	.9	.0	1.9	12.0
2001	New York	32	0	19.3	.457	.378	.784	1.6	1.6	.8	.0	1.5	8.2
2002	New York	32	1	20.6	.442	.386	.679	2.1	1.7	.8	.0	1.7	8.0
2003	New York	11	2	23.4	**.575**	**.469**°	.951°	1.9	1.6	.9	.1	2.4	14.7
2004	New York	**34**	**34**	33.2	.432	.335	.836	**3.5**	4.4	1.7	.1	3.4	13.5
2005	New York	**34**	**34**	**34.7**	.432	.365	.901°	3.4	4.3	**1.8**	.1	3.1	13.9
2006	New York	22	20	30.8	.425	.343	.960°	3.0	3.7	1.3	.1	2.9	14.7
2007	San Antonio	28	26	33.4	.445	.404	.931°	2.8	5.0°	.8	.2	4.0	18.8
2008	San Antonio	33	33	33.4	.390	.350	.937	2.8	4.9	1.3	.2	3.1	17.6
2009	San Antonio	31	31	33.8	.447	.369	.901	3.3	5.0	1.6	**.4**	3.5	**19.5**
2010	San Antonio	32	32	33.6	.442	.390	.960°	2.9	5.4	1.1	.2	3.3	15.1
2011	San Antonio	33	33	31.8	.440	.389	.892	2.9	**5.8**	1.5	.2	3.6	15.9
2012	San Antonio	33	33	30.2	.441	.435	.876	2.5	5.3	.9	.2	3.2	14.7
2013	San Antonio	1	1	12.0	.333	.000	.000	1.0	1.0	.0	.0	3.0	2.0
2014	San Antonio	32	32	24.5	.417	.398	**1.000**‡	1.4	4.2	.4	.1	1.6	9.1
Career		450	329	27.9	.438	.378	.897	2.5	3.8	1.1	.1	2.7	13.9

==== Playoffs ====
Year	Team	GP	GS	MPG	FG%	3P%	FT%	RPG	APG	SPG	BPG	TO	PPG
1999	New York	6	0	8.3	.167	.222	**1.000**	.2	.8	.0	.0	1.0	2.0
2000	New York	7	7	29.4	.429	.304	.895	1.4	2.1	1.3	.0	2.4	9.4
2001	New York	6	0	8.0	.353	.300	.000	.5	.3	.2	.0	**.5**	2.5
2002	New York	8	0	22.9	**.537**	.424	.875	2.1	2.0	.6	.0	1.3	9.9
2004	New York	5	5	35.6	.392	.333	.400	2.6	3.4	1.2	.0	3.8	10.6
2005	New York	2	2	**38.0**	.450	.286	**1.000**	**3.5**	2.0	.0	.0	5.0	11.5
2007	San Antonio	5	5	35.0	.413	.444	.800	2.8	5.0	1.2	.2	3.2	**20.8**
2008	San Antonio	**9**	**9**	36.8	.421	.458	.895	2.3	4.6	1.0	**0.6**	3.4	18.1
2009	San Antonio	3	3	33.7	.463	.381	.900	2.7	2.0	**1.7**	.0	2.3	18.3
2010	San Antonio	2	2	37.0	.393	.389	**1.000**	**3.5**	**5.5**	.5	.0	4.0	20.0
2011	San Antonio	3	3	34.7	.350	.391	.857	2.7	4.3	1.7	.7	3.0	16.3
2012	San Antonio	2	2	35.0	.500	.364	**1.000**	3.0	4.5	1.0	.0	3.5	17.0
2014	San Antonio	2	2	28.5	.526	**.500**	**1.000**	**3.5**	4.5	1.5	.0	2.5	14.5
Career		60	40	27.5	.426	.390	.889	2.0	2.9	.9	.1	2.4	12.0

=== College ===
Year	Team	GP	GS	MPG	FG%	3P%	FT%	RPG	APG	SPG	BPG	TO	PPG
1995–96	Colorado State	31	-	-	47.2	**42.7**	80.9	3.1	3.3	2.3	0.1	-	19.2
1996–97	Colorado State	28	-	-	46.0	39.7	77.6	**4.0**	3.6	1.7	0.1	-	22.1
1997–98	Colorado State	30	-	-	**50.9**	40.2	**88.6**	3.9	4.4	**3.3**	0.1	-	**23.5**
1998–99	Colorado State	**36**	-	-	49.6	41.6	86.2	3.8	**4.8**	2.7	0.1	-	22.9
**Career**		125	-	-	48.5	41.1	84.1	3.7	4.1	2.5	0.1	-	21.9
Statistics retrieved from Sports-Reference.

=== Head coaching record ===
Legend
Regular season	G	Games coached	W	Games won	L	Games lost	W–L %	Win–loss %
Playoffs	PG	Playoff games	PW	Playoff wins	PL	Playoff losses	PW–L %	Playoff win–loss %

Team	Year	G	W	L	W–L%	Finish	PG	PW	PL	PW–L%	Result
Las Vegas	2022	36	26	10	.722	1st in Western	10	8	2	.800	**Won WNBA Finals**
Las Vegas	2023	40	34	6	.850	1st in Western	9	8	1	.889	**Won WNBA Finals**
Las Vegas	2024	40	27	13	.675	2nd in Western	6	3	3	.500	Lost in Semifinals
Las Vegas	2025	44	30	14	.682	2nd in Western	12	9	3	.750	**Won WNBA Finals**
Career		160	117	43	.731		37	28	9	.757	

== National team career ==
=== United States ===
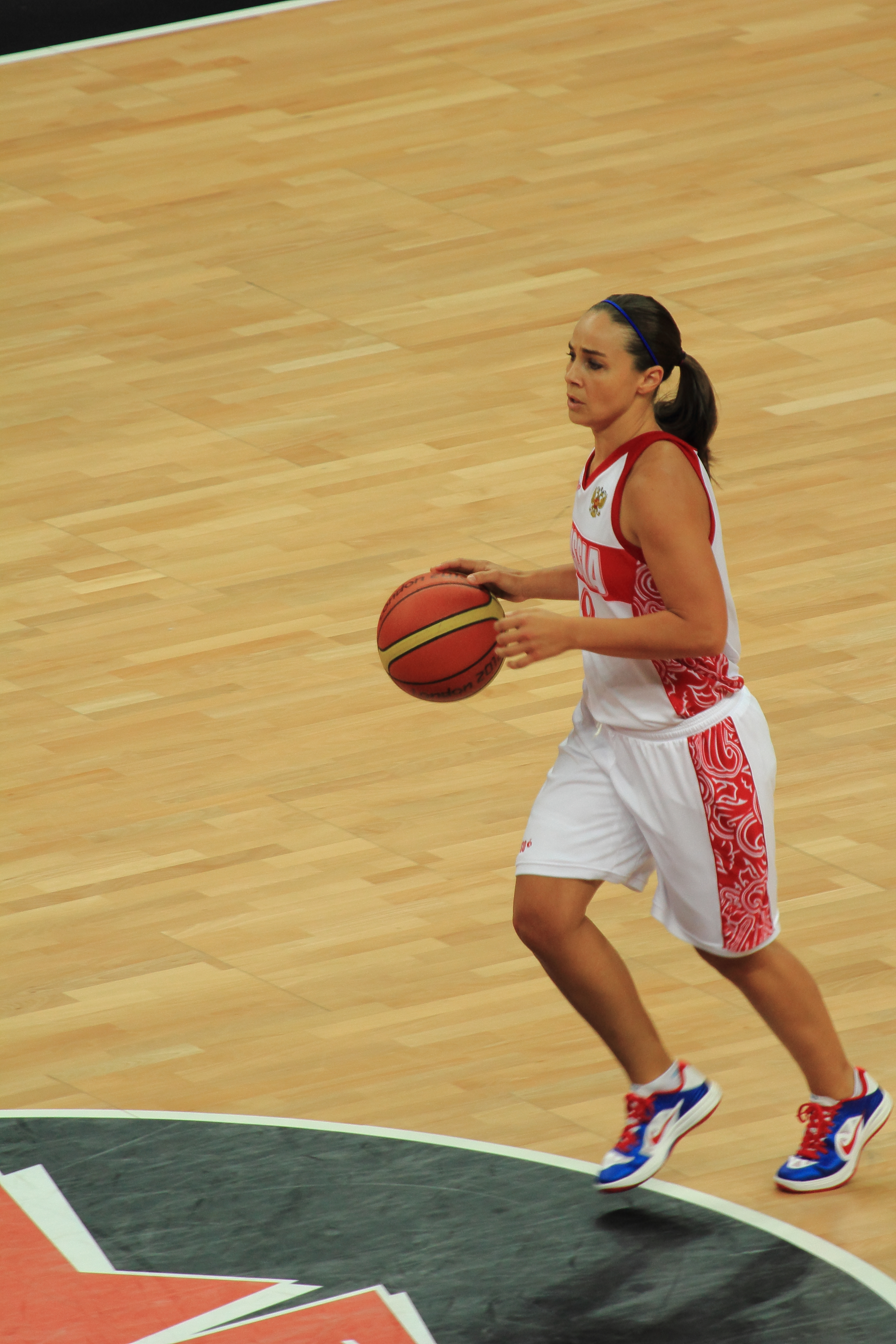
Hammon at the 2012 Summer Olympics

Hammon was named to the team representing the United States at the 1998 William Jones Cup competition in Taipei, Taiwan. The U.S. team, coached by Nell Fortner, won all five games, earning the gold medal for the competition. Hammon scored 18 points over the five games.

=== Russia ===
In 2008, after learning that she would not be invited to try out for the U.S. national team, Hammon announced she would try to claim a roster slot on the Russian national team in the 2008 Olympics in Beijing. Hammon became a Russian citizen in 2008, a decision that was controversial at the time among American basketball commentators. The coach of Russia's team, Igor Grudin, was also the sports director of the CSKA team that Hammon played for in Moscow during the WNBA off-season. Hammon also signed a three-year extension with CSKA Moscow at around the same time she was named as a prospect for the national team.

Hammon shot 1-for-6 from the field in a 67–52 loss to the United States in the 2008 Olympic semifinals, but helped the Russian team to win the bronze medal by scoring 22 points against China. She played for Russia at EuroBasket 2009, the 2010 World Championship and the 2012 Olympics.

In response to the detention of Brittney Griner in Russia due to alleged drug possession in 2022, Hammon joined other athletes to call for the release of Griner.

== Popular culture ==
Hammon was shown in Marie Claire magazine's "The 8 Greatest Moments for Women in Sports".

== Personal life ==
Hammon has been in a relationship with Brenda Milano since 2015. They have two adopted sons.

Hammon is also a noted poker player in the WNBA off-season. In December 2023 she attended the inaugural World Series of Poker Paradise event, where her first tournament was the $5 million guaranteed $1,650 Mystery Millions.

== Controversies ==
=== Russian national team controversy ===
Hammon's decision to gain naturalized Russian citizenship and play for the Russian national team in the 2008 Beijing Summer Olympics was controversial in the United States. In some circles she was branded an American traitor, with then-U.S. national coach Anne Donovan questioning Hammon's patriotism, saying "if you play in this country, live in this country, and you grow up in the heartland and you put on a Russian uniform, you are not a patriotic person in my mind".

Hammon responded to Donovan's criticism saying, "You don't know me. You don't know what that flag means to me. You don't know how I grew up. The biggest honor in our classroom was who could put up the (American) flag, roll it up right, not let the corners touch the ground. Obviously we definitely define patriotism differently." She has also stated. "I love my country. I love our national anthem. It absolutely gives me chills sometimes. I feel honored to be an American, to be from America because of what we stand for." Hammon said she played for Russia primarily to play on the Olympic stage, and it was not a purely financial decision. However, by obtaining Russian citizenship, her salary with the Russian pro team WBC CSKA Moscow tripled, and she was eligible to make $250,000 for winning a gold medal for Russia from the government. She would have received a $150,000 bonus for winning a silver medal. The women's Russian national team won bronze.

Anne Donovan later changed her position, stating "I don't know that I have any strong thoughts on [Becky Hammon joining the Russian national team] anymore. Even at the time. I've known marathon runners in particular that I've watched over the years have represented other countries. I've watched other athletes do it."

She also said:

The thing that took me off guard with Becky was that it hasn't happened in women's basketball before. And again, the facts around that: that we didn't ask her to participate, that we didn't ask her to try out for our team, that's really what I had the most issue with. Becky made a great business decision and this was a great opportunity for her to get to the Olympic Games. I hold no grudge and more power to her. But the facts around it when it first came out were not accurate. Becky came, had a great experience; I'm glad we're going to the gold medal game.

=== Discrimination and mistreatment allegations ===
In May 2023, Becky Hammon received a two-game suspension from the WNBA for violating the league's 'respect in the workplace' policies in her treatment of former Aces player Dearica Hamby. This suspension was the result of a multi-month investigation into Hamby's allegations of discrimination and mistreatment at the hands of Hammon and the Aces after informing them of her pregnancy in August 2022, a pregnancy she alleges is also what led to the team trading her to Los Angeles Sparks in January 2023. The WNBA's investigation included interviews with 33 people, in addition to a review of documents including texts and emails, and further resulted in the Aces losing their first round 2025 draft pick.

In September 2023, Hamby filed a discrimination complaint with the Equal Employment Opportunity Commission (EEOC) after criticizing the WNBA's investigation for failing to speak with other Aces players and for not dispensing adequate punishment to Hammon or the team. The EEOC granted Hamby a "Notice of the Right to Sue" on May 23 2024.

On August 12, 2024, Hamby filed a federal lawsuit in U.S. District Court against the WNBA and the Aces. In the lawsuit, Hamby alleges that Hammon questioned her commitment and dedication to the Aces; asked if Hamby's pregnancy was planned; and told Hamby that she was a "question mark" on the team as the Aces "needed bodies" and she would not be ready to play in time for the start of the 2024 season. It further alleges Hammon told Hamby that she did not "hold up her end of the bargain," implying that Hamby had implicitly agreed not to get pregnant when she signed her two-year contract extension.

Hammon has denied the allegations, stating in a post-game press conference after the federal lawsuit was filed:

"Here's some facts: I've been in either the WNBA or the NBA for now 25 years. I've never had an HR complaint. Never, not once. I still didn't, actually, because Dearica didn't file any. She didn't file with the players' union, she didn't file with the WNBA. Those are facts. It's also factual that nobody made a call about trading her until Atlanta called us in January [2023]. That's a fact. So...it just didn't happen. I'm sorry, the bullying? I spoke with her every day. If she wanted to practice, she practiced. If she didn't, she didn't. Over-the-top care, actually. Over-the-top care."

The lawsuit is currently ongoing.

== See also ==
- List of female NBA coaches
- List of WNBA career 3-point scoring leaders
- List of WNBA career assists leaders
- List of WNBA career free throw scoring leaders

Awards and achievements
Preceded by Award created	WNBA Peak Performer (assists); 2008	Succeeded by Lindsay Whalen
