= HockeyDB =

Website collecting hockey information and statistics

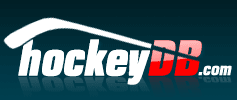
- Website type: Private
- Available in: English, French
- Creator: Ralph Slate
- Website: www.hockeydb.com
- Launched: Nov. 30, 1996; 29 years ago
- Current status: Active

HockeyDB, originally known as the Internet Hockey Database, is a Canadian-American website dedicated to the specialization of statistics behind the game of ice hockey. It is one of the largest repositories of hockey data on the internet, gathering more than 1.3 million unique visitors a month.

== History ==
HockeyDB was founded by Ralph Slate in 1996, through the old Usenet. With the database being founded two years before Google was incorporated, it has become a go-to database for every level of hockey fan. The website covers hockey statistics of leagues across the world, from the National Hockey League to the Austrian Hockey League and many more. The website created different ways to look at NHL players, as well as having the standings and statistics for nearly every professional hockey player to play the game.

Hockey statistics on the website are updated on a regular basis and include daily morning reports, which detail the current standings of world-wide leagues, daily hockey transactions, and all-time records. The NHL player list is categorized in many ways, from One Game Wonders to Playoff-only Players to the Pack Your Bag Club. The website also allows you to search the player list by league and by team.

Slate has been interviewed on multiple occasions on the success of HockeyDB. In 2017, Slate stated that he has compiled a set of encyclopedias’ worth of digital information: some 186,531 players, 7,220 teams, 416 leagues, 2,131 logos, and 6,071 sets of hockey cards.

In 2018, Slate was interviewed by FanSided writer Michael Joubran to discuss more about the website that connects fans to the statistics of their favorite players, past and present. In that interview, Slate dropped an easter egg, saying “if I have more than one photo of a player [on the website], clicking on the player’s photo will cycle through them all.”

=== Popularity ===
Peter Alper joined the HockeyDB team in 2019. He is responsible for creating the site's first Twitter account. As of September 2022, the HockeyDB Twitter account has amassed over 41,000 followers. The account is known for using images and statistics from the website to spark conversation on social media. Some discussions include who has the best hockey headshot, who were the best hockey players on Wall Street, and who were the biggest busts in the last 10 years of NHL drafts.
