= Bobby Webster =

American basketball executive (born 1984)

Toronto Raptors
- Positions: General manager and executive vice-president
- League: NBA

Personal information
- Born: 1984 (age 41–42) Kailua, Hawaii, U.S.

Career information
- College: University of California, Santa Barbara (BA)

Career highlights
- As executive: NBA champion (2019)

Bobby Webster (born 1984) is an American professional basketball executive who is the general manager and executive vice-president for the Toronto Raptors of the National Basketball Association (NBA).

== Career ==
In 2006, Webster joined the NBA's front office. He worked with the NBA's Labor Relations Committee during the negotiations for the NBA Collective Bargaining Agreement (CBA) in 2011. During his time with the NBA's front office, he advised personnel from all 30 NBA franchises on issues relating to the CBA, salary cap, and luxury tax planning. Webster served as the NBA's Associate Director for Salary Cap Management before he joined the Toronto Raptors' front office in June 2013.

Webster joined the Raptors as the first hire for the team's new president and general manager, Masai Ujiri, initially as the team's Vice President of Basketball Management and Strategy, and later as the Raptors' assistant general manager. In June 2017, he was named as the team's general manager to replace outgoing Jeff Weltman, making him the youngest NBA general manager at the time. On June 13, 2019, Webster won his first NBA championship with the Raptors.

On August 18, 2025, the Raptors extended Webster and promoted him to head of basketball operations, succeeding Ujiri.

== Personal life ==
Webster is the son of Bob and Jean Webster. His mother is Japanese American from Hawaii, while his father is from Chicago. Webster's siblings include an older brother named Kevin, and an older sister named Olivia. Webster attended the ʻIolani School, graduating in 2002. He later majored in economics at the University of California at Santa Barbara, graduating from the university in three years.

Webster has been married to wife Lauren since 2015. They have three children.
