= List of female NBA coaches =

The list of female NBA coaches includes all women who have been assistant head coaches in the National Basketball Association (NBA).

== List ==
Note: This list is correct through the start of the 2024–25 season.

*	Denotes head or assistant coach who is still active in the NBA

=== List of assistant coaches ===
Assistant coach	Nationality^{[A]}	Career^{[B]}	Notes	Ref.
Jenny Boucek*	United States	2017–present	Assistant coach for the Indiana Pacers. Previously player development coach for the Sacramento Kings (2017–18) and assistant coach for the Dallas Mavericks (2018–21).	
Lisa Boyer	United States	2001–2002	Associate head coach of the South Carolina Gamecocks women's basketball team. Previously assistant coach for the Cleveland Cavaliers. First woman to hold a coaching position in NBA history.	
Edniesha Curry	United States	2021–2022	Head coach of the U.S. Virgin Islands men's basketball team. Previously assistant coach for the Portland Trail Blazers.	
Brittni Donaldson	United States	2019–2025	Assistant coach and assistant general manager for the Portland Fire. Previously assistant coach for the Toronto Raptors (2019–22), Detroit Pistons (2022–23), and Atlanta Hawks (2023–2025).	
Lindsay Gottlieb	United States	2019–2021	Head coach of the USC Trojans women's basketball team. Previously assistant coach for the Cleveland Cavaliers. First women's college coach recruited to an NBA staff.	
Becky Hammon	Russia; United States	2014–2022	Head coach of the Las Vegas Aces. Previously assistant coach for the San Antonio Spurs. First female full-time assistant coach in any of North America's major professional leagues. Head coach of 2015 Las Vegas NBA Summer League championship team. First woman to serve as head coach in an NBA game (Spurs versus Lakers on December 30, 2020).	
Lindsey Harding*	United States	2018–present	Assistant coach for Los Angeles Lakers. Previously player development coach for the Philadelphia 76ers (2018–19), assistant coach/player development coach for the Sacramento Kings (2019–23), and head coach for the Stockton Kings (2023–24).	
Niele Ivey	United States	2019–2020	Head coach for Notre Dame Fighting Irish women's basketball team. Previously assistant coach for the Memphis Grizzlies.	
Kara Lawson	United States	2019–2020	Head coach for the Duke Blue Devils women's basketball team. Previously assistant coach for the Boston Celtics.	
Nancy Lieberman	United States	2015–2017	Former assistant coach for the Sacramento Kings. First woman to coach a professional men's basketball team, the Texas Legends of the NBA Development League (2010–2011).	
Natalie Nakase	United States	2018–2020	Head coach of the Golden State Valkyries. Previously player development coach with the Los Angeles Clippers.	
Sonia Raman	United States	2020–2024	Head coach of the Seattle Storm. Previously assistant coach for the Memphis Grizzlies.	
Kristi Toliver	Slovakia; United States	2018–2023	Associate head coach for the Phoenix Mercury. Previously assistant coach for the Washington Wizards (2018–20) and Dallas Mavericks (2021–23).	
Karen Stack Umlauf	United States	2018–2020	Previously senior director of basketball operations and assistant coach for the Chicago Bulls.	
Teresa Weatherspoon	United States	2019–2023	Head coach for the Vinyl BC. Previously player development coach (2019–20) and assistant coach (2020–23) for the New Orleans Pelicans.	

== See also ==
- List of current NBA head coaches

== Notes ==
- ^{A} Nationality indicates a coach's representative country.
- ^{B} Career in the NBA
