= Immaculate Grid =

Online sports trivia game

- Developer: Brian Minter
- Publishers: Brian Minter (2023); Sports Reference (July 2023–present)
- Platform: Browser
- Release: April 2023
- Genre: Sports video game
- Mode: Single-player

Immaculate Grid is a browser game in which players get nine guesses to fill a 3x3 grid with professional athletes. Originally developed for baseball, it has since been expanded to each of the other major American professional sports, as well as soccer. It uses data from Sports Reference.

== Gameplay ==
Each of the grid's three rows and columns corresponds to a professional team, statistical achievement, or award, and players must fill each square by selecting an athlete who meets both criteria. Since players get only one guess per square, each one must be correct for the result to be "immaculate". Correctly guessed players cannot be used elsewhere in the grid. Originally, the player's score was simply the number of correct guesses, but a rarity score was later added to encourage players to think of lesser known answers.

== History ==
The game was developed by Brian Minter, a software developer from Atlanta, who named it after the immaculate inning, in which a pitcher strikes out three batters on three pitches each. The first grid appeared on April 4, 2023. Originally, the grids were automated, but Minter eventually began to select the categories himself in order to avoid repetition. As of May 2023, the game was primarily played by Minter and his friends, but it began to gain a larger audience when one of them posted it to Reddit, and became even more popular after it was shared by the Twitter account @FoolishBB on June 13.

Sports Reference LLC purchased the game on July 11; the company integrated links to lists of all valid choices for each square on its site Baseball Reference, added more player photos, and announced plans to create separate versions of the game for basketball and American football. The football version was launched on July 20, 2023, the (men's) basketball version followed on July 25, and an ice hockey version was launched one day later. A soccer version, called Immaculate Footy, was rolled out on August 18, 2023. A version for women's basketball exists as well.

== Reception ==
As of July 2023, the game averaged 200,000 players each weekday. It is popular among both current and former Major League Baseball players.
