= Giants of Africa =

2016 film by Hubert Davis

- Directed by: Hubert Davis
- Written by: Hubert Davis
- Produced by: Josiah Rothenberg
- Starring: Masai Ujiri
- Cinematography: Chris Romeike
- Edited by: Dave De Carlo
- Music by: Fraser MacDougall, Michael White & Tim White
- Production company: Maple Leaf Sports and Entertainment
- Release date: September 18, 2016 (TIFF)
- Running time: 77 minutes
- Country: Canada
- Language: English

Giants of Africa is a 2016 Canadian documentary film, directed by Hubert Davis. The film centres on Nigerian-Canadian sports executive Masai Ujiri's Basketball Without Borders program to promote and build the sport of basketball in Africa.

The film garnered two Canadian Screen Award nominations at the 5th Canadian Screen Awards in 2017, for Best Editing in a Documentary (Dave De Carlo) and Best Cinematography in a Documentary (Chris Romeike). It won the award for Best Editing.

== See also ==
- List of basketball films
