= Sports Reference =

American sports statistics company

Sports Reference, LLC
- Type: Private
- Industry: Sports statistics
- Founded: August 2004; 22 years ago
- Founder: Sean Forman
- Headquarters: Philadelphia, Pennsylvania, U.S.
- Products: Baseball Reference; Basketball Reference; FBref; Hockey Reference; Immaculate Grid; Pro Football Reference; SR/College Basketball; SR/College Football; Stathead
- Website: www.sports-reference.com

Sports Reference, LLC is an American sports statistics company that operates databases of several sports. They include Pro Football Reference for American football, Baseball Reference for baseball, Basketball Reference for basketball, Hockey Reference for ice hockey, FBref for association football (soccer), and pages for college football and basketball. Sports Reference also operate the online sports trivia game Immaculate Grid and the statistics-based subscription service Stathead. From 2008 to 2020, the website included Olympic Games statistics from the first Games to the most recent.

== History ==
The company was founded in Philadelphia by Sean Forman in 2004 and incorporated as Sports Reference LLC in 2007. The company operates databases of sports statistics for several sports. They include Pro Football Reference for American football, Baseball Reference for baseball, Basketball Reference for basketball, Hockey Reference for ice hockey, FBref for association football (soccer), and pages for college football and basketball. Sports Reference maintained a section on the Olympics from 2008 to 2020. The sites attempt a comprehensive approach to sports data. For example, Baseball Reference contains more than 100,000 box scores while Pro Football Reference contains data on every scoring play in the National Football League (NFL) since 1941. The college basketball section includes data on NCAA Division I men's basketball, with incomplete data going back as far as 1892—predating the first NCAA divisional split (1956) and the NCAA itself (1906). Division I women's basketball stats were added in 2023 with complete scores and results and 10,000 box scores included in 2025. Sports Reference purchased the baseball trivia game Immaculate Grid on July 11, 2023, and integrated it with its sites.

== Olympics ==
Sports Reference Olympics logo

Sports Reference added a site for Olympic Games statistics and history in July 2008, including statistics from the first games to the most recent.

The company announced in December 2016 that the Olympics site was to shut down in the near future due to a change in its data licensing agreement. Data for the 2016 Summer Olympics were added, but the site was not updated for the 2018 Winter Olympics. Sports Reference closed its Olympic site on May 14, 2020.

The providers of the Olympic data, known as OlyMADmen, launched a new site called Olympedia in May 2020. According to Slate, editing of "Olympedia [was] restricted to about two dozen trusted academics and researchers who specialize in Olympic history." The site is owned by the International Olympic Committee (IOC).
