= Lisa Boyer =

College basketball coach

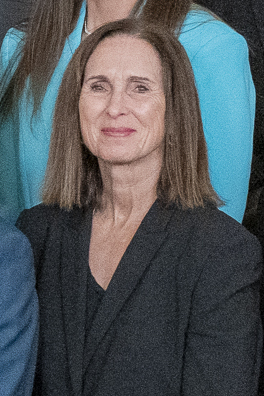
- Boyer in 2024

Current position
- Title: Associate head coach
- Team: South Carolina
- Conference: SEC

Biographical details
- Born: 1957 (age 68–69); Ogdensburg, New York, U.S.
- Education: Ithaca Bombers

Coaching career (HC unless noted)
- 1981–1982: Davidson (asst.)
- 1982–1983: Converse
- 1983–1984: East Carolina (asst.)
- 1984–1985: Miami (asst.)
- 1985–1986: Virginia Tech (asst.)
- 1986–1996: Bradley
- 1996–1997: Philadelphia Rage
- 1998–2002: Cleveland Rockers (asst.)
- 2001–2002: Cleveland Cavaliers (volunteer asst.)
- 2002–2008: Temple (asst.)
- 2008–2010: South Carolina (asst.)
- 2010–present: South Carolina (associate HC)

Head coaching record
- Overall: 124–149 (.454) (NCAA); 34–50 (.405) (ABL)

Lisa Boyer is the associate head coach of the South Carolina Gamecocks women's basketball team since 2010. Prior to her time with the Gamecocks, Boyer was the head coach of the Bradley Braves women's basketball team from 1986 to 1996. As an assistant for the Cleveland Cavaliers from 2001 to 2002, Boyer was the first woman to coach in the National Basketball Association. Boyer was inducted into the Ithaca College Athletics Hall of Fame in 2014.

== Early life and education ==
Boyer was born in Ogdensburg, New York. She graduated from Ithaca College with a Bachelor of Science and the University of North Carolina at Greensboro with a master's degree.

== Career ==
Boyer started her coaching career as an assistant coach for the Davidson Wildcats women's basketball team from 1981 to 1982. After head coaching the Converse Valkyries for a season, Boyer was briefly an assistant coach for the East Carolina Pirates, Miami RedHawks, and Virginia Tech Hokies until the mid-1980s. After leaving the Hokies in 1986, Boyer began a ten-year position as the head coach of the Bradley Braves women's basketball team. She then moved on to the American Basketball League to head coach the Philadelphia Rage from 1996 to 1997.

After the ABL, Boyer went to the Women's National Basketball Association and was the assistant coach of the Cleveland Rockers from 1998 to 2002. During her time with the Rockers, she became the first woman to hold a coaching position in the National Basketball Association. In the NBA, she was an assistant for the Cleveland Cavaliers from 2001 to 2002, under then-head coach John Lucas.

Boyer returned to the National Collegiate Athletic Association in 2002 when she was named an assistant coach for the Temple Owls women's basketball team, working for Dawn Staley. She remained with the Owls until 2008 when she followed Staley to the South Carolina Gamecocks and resumed her assistant coach position. Boyer was promoted to associate head coach of the Gamecocks in 2010.

== Head coaching record ==
Record table
Season	Team	Overall	Conference	Standing	Postseason
Bradley Braves (Missouri Valley Conference) (1986–1996)
1986-87	Bradley	15–13	10–8	T-4th	
1987-88	Bradley	9–18	6–12	T-6th	
1988-89	Bradley	12–15	6–12	7th	
1989-90	Bradley	16–12	12–6	4th	
1990-91	Bradley	13–14	9–9	T-5th	
1991-92	Bradley	17–11	11–7	T-3rd	
1992-93	Bradley	7–20	4–12	T-7th	
1993-94	Bradley	9–18	4–12	8th	
1994-95	Bradley	13–14	7–11	7th	
1995-96	Bradley	12–15	7–11	T-6th	
Bradley:		123–150 (.451)	76–100 (.432)		
Total:		123–150 (.451)			

== Awards and honors ==
Boyer was named the Women's Basketball Coach of the Year for the Missouri Valley Conference during 1990. She was inducted into the Ithaca College Athletics Hall of Fame in 2014.

== See also ==
- List of female NBA coaches
