= SportVU =

SportVU was a camera system that collects data 25 times per second. Its main objective is to follow the ball and all players on the court. SportVU provides statistics such as real-time player and ball positioning through software and statistical algorithms. Through this data, STATS presents performance metrics for players and teams to use.

STATS was first created for soccer, however it later expanded the core SportVU technology into basketball beginning with the 2010-2011 NBA season. From 2013-2017, STATS, LLC was the Official Tracking partner of the NBA. The NBA uses statistics collected by SportVU on NBA.com and NBATV as well as in arenas across the country to provide information for the audience. SportVU statistics are utilized by teams in the league for the purpose of analytics and player development. The cameras keep a digitized visual record of every game, collecting players' positions and speed.

== History ==
=== 2005-2010 ===
SportVU was created in 2005 by scientists, Gal Oz and Miky Tamir, who had a background in missile tracking and advanced optical recognition. They had previously used the same science to track soccer matches in Israel.

SportVU was featured at national trade shows NAB 2007, in Las Vegas, and International Broadcasting Convention 2007, in Amsterdam. In 2008, SportVU was acquired by STATS LLC. STATS then centers SportVU efforts on basketball. During the 2009 NBA Finals in Orlando, STATS demoed their SportVU technology for NBA executives. At the start of the 2010-2011 NBA season, four teams were contracted to use SportVU, the Dallas Mavericks, Houston Rockets, Oklahoma City Thunder and San Antonio Spurs.

=== 2011-2015 ===
SportVU converted their tracking system from delayed processing to real-time data delivery during the 2011-2012 NBA season. At the start of the 2012-2013 season, 10 teams were using SportVU.

Since the 2013-2014 NBA season, the SportVU camera system was installed in all NBA arenas. In the same year, STATS added the ICE analytics platform to organize, display and analyze SportVU data. NBA team, Toronto Raptors, shared with sports blog, Grantland, their progress with the use of SportVU's new algorithms. The Raptors Analytics Team created a graphical user interface to play video footage of the play from the X-Y coordinates.

=== 2016-2017 ===
In 2016, STATS and the NBA met an agreement to extend SportVU tracking data to more media outlets including ESPN, NBA on TNT, and Bleacher Report.

Beginning in the 2016-2017 season, STATS was used as France's Ligue de Football Professionnel's official data and tracking provider. STATS used SportVU to provide football data and statistics.

After NBA's adoption of SportVU tracking technology in 2013, statisticians and data scientists used tools such as machine learning to provide more complex statistics from the tracking data. At the 10th annual MIT Sloan Sports Analytics Conference in 2016, STATS's own Director of Data Science and his team was awarded for their contributions to a research paper on the prediction of shot outcomes in tennis. Other research papers completed for the MIT Sloan Sports Analytics Conference included Kirk Goldsberry's paper in 2014 concerning the prediction of points and evaluation of decision-making in basketball.
