= Speed Score =

Baseball statistic

Speed Score, often simply abbreviated to Spd, is a statistic used in Sabermetric studies to evaluate a baseball player's speed. It was invented by Bill James, and first appeared in the 1987 edition of the Bill James Baseball Abstract.

Speed score is on a scale of 0 to 10, with zero being the slowest and ten being the fastest. League average is generally around 4.5.

== Formula ==
Speed Score is calculated using six factors: stolen base percentage, stolen base attempts as a percentage of opportunities, triples, double plays grounded into as a percentage of opportunities, runs scored as a percentage of times on base, and defensive position and range.

=== Factors ===
The individuals factors are calculated as follows:

Factor 1 (Stolen base percentage):

$$\mathit{F1} = 20 \cdot \left({\mathit{SB} + 3 \over \mathit{SB} + \mathit{CS} +7} - 0.4\right)$$

Where SB=stolen bases and CS=caught stealings.

Factor 2 (Stolen base attempts):

$$\mathit{F2} = {1 \over 0.07} \cdot \sqrt{{\mathit{SB} + \mathit{CS} \over \mathit{1B} + \mathit{BB} + \mathit{HBP}}}$$

Where 1B=singles, BB=walks and HBP=hit by pitch.

Factor 3 (Triples):

$$\mathit{F3} = 625 \cdot {\mathit{3B} \over \mathit{AB} - \mathit{HR} - \mathit{K}}$$

Where 3B=triples, AB=at bats, HR=home runs and K=strikeouts.

Factor 4 (Runs scored):

$$\mathit{F4} = 25 \cdot \left({\mathit{R} - \mathit{HR} \over \mathit{H} + \mathit{BB} + \mathit{HBP} - \mathit{HR}} - 0.1\right)$$

Where R=runs and H=hits.

Factor 5 (Grounded into double plays):

$$\mathit{F5} = {1 \over 0.007} \cdot  \left(0.063 - {\mathit{GDP} \over \mathit{AB} - \mathit{HR} - \mathit{K}}\right)$$

Where GDP=times ground into double play.

Factor 6 (Defensive position and range):

This is dependent upon the player's primary position as follows:

P: $\mathit{F6} = 0$
C: $\mathit{F6} = 1$
1B: $\mathit{F6} = 2$
2B: $\mathit{F6} = {5 \over 4} \cdot {\mathit{PO} + \mathit{A} \over \mathit{G}}$
3B: $\mathit{F6} = {4 \over 2.65} \cdot {\mathit{PO} + \mathit{A} \over \mathit{G}}$
SS: $\mathit{F6} = {{7 \over 4.6}} \cdot {\mathit{PO} + \mathit{A} \over \mathit{G}}$
OF: $\mathit{F6} = 3 \cdot {\mathit{PO} + \mathit{A} \over \mathit{G}}$

Where P is pitcher, C is catcher, 1B is first baseman, 2B is second baseman, 3B is third baseman, SS is shortstop, OF is outfielder, PO=putouts, A=assists and G=games played.

=== Final Calculation ===
If any factor is less than zero, it is converted to zero, and if any factor is greater than ten, it is converted to ten.

The average of factors 1 through 6 is taken, and the result is the player's score.

$$\mathit{Spd} = {\mathit{F1} + \mathit{F2} + \mathit{F3} + \mathit{F4} + \mathit{F5} + \mathit{F6} \over 6}$$

== Developments ==
In 2006, Baseball Prospectus developed their own version of speed score in order to "better [take] advantage of play-by-play data and [ensure] that equal weight is given to the five components." It is on the same zero to ten scale and includes all the original factors (except for the player's defense). 5.0 is set as exactly league average. In general, very fast players tend to score around 7.0 and very slow players around 3.0.

== See also ==
- Bill James
- Sabermetrics
