= Basketball Without Borders =

Basketball instructional camp

Basketball Without Borders logo

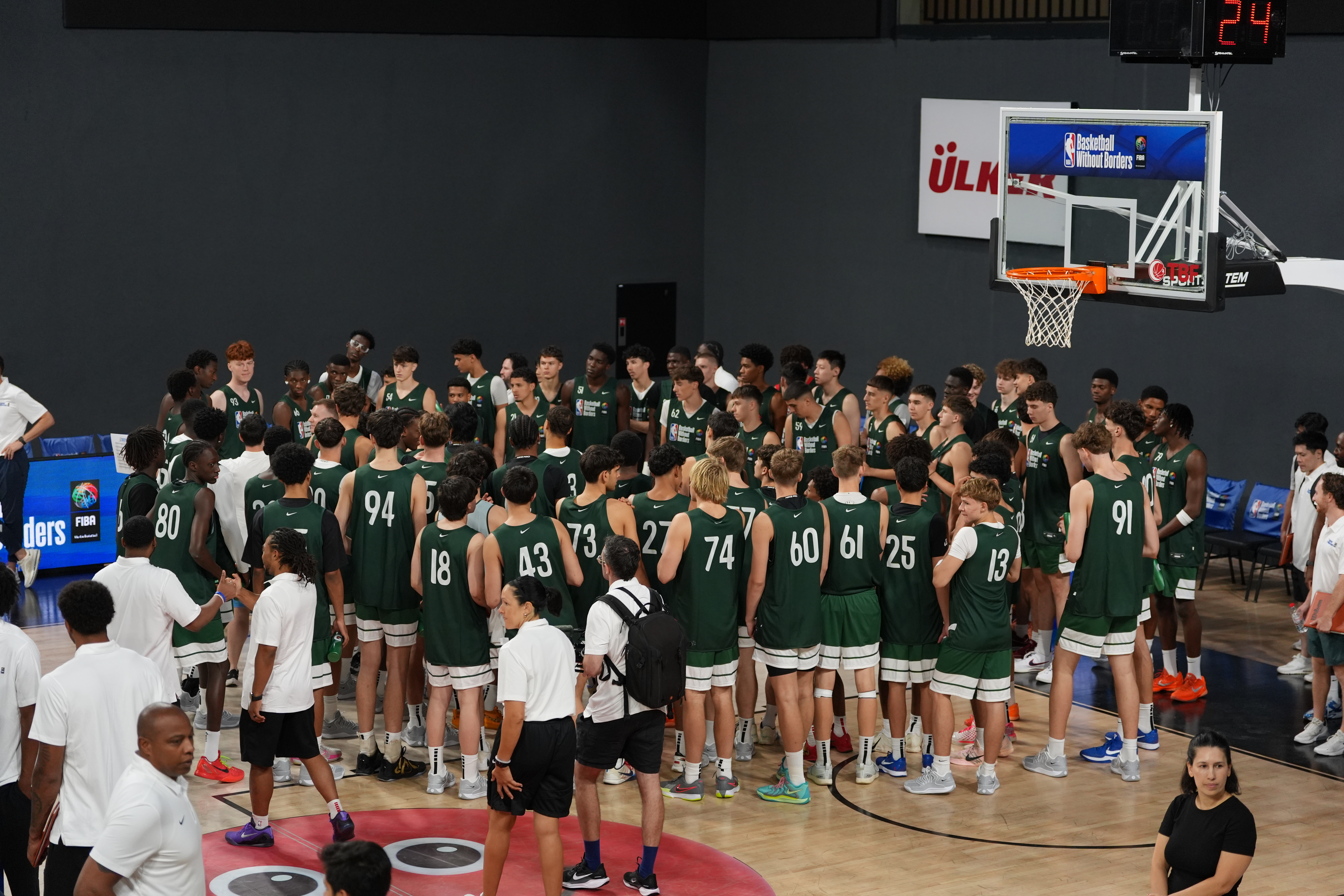
2026 Basketball Without Borders Istanbul camp squad

Basketball Without Borders is a collaborative global development and community relations outreach program between FIBA and the NBA.

== History ==
Billed as a “summer camp for 12–14-year-olds designed to promote friendship and understanding through sport,” the initial editions focused on peace and international relations, bringing together youths from former Yugoslavia in 2001 shortly after the Yugoslav Wars and from Greece and Turkey in 2002 amidst tense Greek–Turkish relations, with leading participation from the UN in both cases.

From the 2003 editions onwards, basketball became the focus of the camps. The age of the participants grew (17 on average) and participants are now mostly selected for their potential, although the selection process by FIBA and national federations is an inclusive system that sees consensual selections from weaker basketball countries.

2003 also saw the first edition of the camp in Africa, seen as uncharted basketball territory at the time. The camps would later expand to the Americas in 2004 and Asia in 2005, including youth from all around the globe (those from Oceania have attended editions in the latter two mentioned regions).

A global camp was first organized in 2015 in New York City as part of the All-Star Game Weekend, giving an opportunity for selected players, identified as the best in their regions, to have a taste of the game at its highest level. This was announced as a recurring annual event.

The camps have gradually become a hotspot for scouts, with a substantial number of former campers who have made it into the NBA (see Attendees) and college basketball. They are seen as a means of spotting unheralded talent with high upside. Players such as Luc Mbah a Moute and Bruno Caboclo are noted examples.

Though basketball skill are now at the forefront of the camp, its social goal remains equally important. Few campers are expected to become professional players, and one of the camp's stated goals to develop its attendees' life-skills, with an emphasis on leadership and personal relationship, so that they can become leaders of change in their home countries.

Ideally, the personal goal for them is to enter a high school or college in the U.S. to get an education they can use in the future. In a given year it was estimated more than 60 former participants were playing and studying in American colleges.

There is a camp for girls as well with coaches from FIBA and the WNBA; however, it receives far less exposure than the boys tournaments.

Basketball Without Borders and program director Masai Ujiri are profiled in Hubert Davis's 2016 documentary film Giants of Africa.

== Format ==
Basketball Without Borders brings together young players (called campers) usually aged 18 and under to a single location for a few days (3 or 4 on average). They are identified by the FIBA, NBA and participating federations with input from international FIBA/ NBA players from the region. For example, some players have been chosen for BWB Africa through Sprite Slam camps in the past.

The youths are divided into teams (sometimes after a draft) named after real NBA teams and managed by coaches who are current and former NBA or FIBA players and coaches. They attend daily basketball fundamentals clinics (passing, shooting, dribbling...) with these coaches and participate in individual and/or team shooting games for prizes before playing in tournament-style games against the other teams.

Also offered are seminars for the campers to improve their life skills (character, leadership, and health concerns...), normally run by local non-government organizations (NGOs).

The camp ends with an All-Star game featuring the camp's best players. Starting in the 2007 edition, a game MVP and a camp-wide MVP are then elected.

In parallel the organizers also implement social responsibility programs with daily community outreach activities in the local area such as organizing seminars for local youths or Special Olympics. These are supplemented by product donations to local organizations, such as schools, and usually an NBA Cares initiative such as building or refurbishing playing and educational infrastructures.

The NBA and its corporate sponsors pay for transport, lodging and meals for the campers and the entourage of personnel (including a full training staff for injuries). Some of many examples include the La Ghirada center in Treviso that was used in early camps and was leased for free by Benetton Group, the campers in BWB Africa flown in by South African Airways, whilst Nike has outfitted the campers in multiple camps.

== Camps ==
Year	Edition	City, Country	Dates	Attendees	Camp MVP
2001	BWB Europe 1	(Italy) Treviso	June 30 – July 2	50	
2002	BWB Europe 2	(Turkey) Istanbul	July 4–7	48	
2003	BWB Europe 3 BWB Africa 1	(Italy) Treviso (South Africa) Johannesburg	June 28 – July 1 September 2–6	46; 106	
2004	BWB Americas 1 BWB Europe 4 BWB Africa 2	(Brazil) Rio de Janeiro (Italy) Treviso (South Africa) Johannesburg	June 28 – July 2 July 24–27; September 8–11	49; 42; 99	
2005	BWB Americas 2 BWB Asia 1 BWB Europe 5 BWB Africa 3	(Argentina) Buenos Aires (China) Beijing (Italy) Treviso (South Africa) Johannesburg	June 30 – July 4 July 11–17; July 28–31; September 7–12	57; 50; 49; 106	
2006	BWB Asia 2 BWB Europe 6 BWB Americas 3 BWB Africa 4	(China) Shanghai (Lithuania) Vilnius (Puerto Rico) San Juan (South Africa) Johannesburg	June 8–11; June 30 – July 3 July 16–19; September 6–10	46; 51; 48; 114	
2007	BWB Asia 3 BWB Americas 4 BWB Europe 7 BWB Africa 5	(China) Shanghai (Brazil) São Paulo (France) Paris (South Africa) Johannesburg	July 5–8; July 31 – August 3 August 6–10; September 5–9	49; 51; 48; 97	Not Awarded (Uruguay) Jayson Granger (Georgia (country)) Nika Metreveli; Not Awarded
2008	BWB Europe 8 BWB Asia 4 BWB Africa 6	(Turkey) Istanbul (India) New Delhi (South Africa) Johannesburg	June 4–7; July 1–6; September 3–8	46; 45; 98	(Montenegro) Nikola Mirotić (India) Vishesh Bhriguvanshi; Not Awarded
2009	BWB Asia 5 BWB Americas 5 BWB Africa 7	(China) Beijing; Mexico City (South Africa) Johannesburg	July 30 – August 2 August 6–9; September 2–6	47; 49; 63	Not Awarded (Argentina) Santiago Nicolas Scala (Cameroon) Cyril Bilong Sonna
2010	BWB Asia 6 BWB Africa 8 BWB Europe 9	Singapore (Senegal) Dakar (Spain) Barcelona	June 28 – July 1 August 5–8; September 16–19	44; 55; 50	(Australia) Tom Daly (Cameroon) Michel Ange Enanga (Poland) Mateusz Ponitka
2011	BWB Americas 6 BWB Europe 10; BWB Africa 9	(Brazil) Rio de Janeiro (Slovenia) Ljubljana (South Africa) Johannesburg	July 29 – August; August 8–11 August; September 1–4	40; 50; 60	(Argentina) Gabriel Deck (France) Boris Dallo (Cameroon) Benoit Mbala Mendzana
2012	BWB Asia 7 BWB Africa 10; BWB Europe 11	(Japan) Tokyo (South Africa) Johannesburg (Russia) Moscow	June 13–16; August 30 – September 2 September 13–16	56; 58; 42	(Japan) Yuki Togashi (Egypt) Romeh Elsadani Sameh Ali (Bosnia and Herzegovina) Nedim Buza
2013	BWB Americas 7 BWB Europe 12; BWB Africa 11	(Argentina) Buenos Aires (Portugal) Lisbon (South Africa) Johannesburg	July 25–28; August 15–18; August 29 – September 1	50; 50; 60	(Brazil) Bruno Caboclo (Italy) Federico Mussini (Angola) Gerson Domingos
2014	BWB Europe 13; BWB Asia 8 BWB Africa 11	(Italy) Rome (Taiwan) Taipei (South Africa) Johannesburg	June 2–5; June 13–16; August 5–8	50; 47; 50	(France) Luc Loubaki (Iran) Mohammad Yousof Vand, (Japan) Ryogo Sumino (South Africa) Luca Lunneman
2015	BWB Global 1 BWB Europe 14	(United States) New York City (Spain) Las Palmas	February 13–15; June 3–6	50; 50	(Croatia) Dragan Bender (Turkey) Ömer Yurtseven
2016	BWB Global 2 BWB Europe 15	(Canada) Toronto (Finland) Lohja	February 12–14; September 7–10	53; 40	(Australia) Harry Froling (Lithuania) Arnas Velička
2017	BWB Global 3 BWB Africa 15; BWB Americas 9 BWB Europe 16	(United States) New Orleans (South Africa) Johannesburg (The Bahamas) Nassau (Israel) Netanya	February 14–16; August 5–8; July 2–5; August 13–16		(Canada) R.J. Barrett (Central African Republic) Kurt-Curry Wegscheider (Argentina) Francisco Farabello (Italy) Omar Dieng
2018	BWB Global 4 BWB Asia 10; BWB Africa 16; BWB Europe 17	(United States) El Segundo (India) New Delhi (South Africa) Johannesburg (Serbia) Belgrade	February 16–18; May 30 – June 2 August 1–4; August 15–18	N/A; 66; N/A; 63	(Nigeria) Charles Bassey (Philippines) Rence Padrigao; N/A (Israel) Deni Avdija
2019	BWB Global 5 BWB Europe 18	(United States) Charlotte (Latvia) Riga	February 15–17; June 10–12	63; 64	(Israel) Deni Avdija (France) Juhann Begarin
2020	BWB Global 6	(United States) Chicago	February 14–16	64	(Germany) Ariel Hukporti
2022	BWB Africa 17	(Egypt) Cairo	August 28–31	60	(Central African Republic) Thierry Serge Darlan
2023	BWB Global 7 BWB Africa 19	(United States) Salt Lake City (South Africa) Johannesburg	February 17–19; July 28–31	40; 80	(Lithuania) Matas Buzelis (South Sudan) Khaman Maluach
2024	BWB Global 8	(United States) Indianapolis	February 16–18	40	(Canada) Will Riley

== Notable Attendees ==
Have played in the NBA
- (Cameroon) Ulrich Chomche (BWB Global 2023)
- (France) Pacôme Dadiet (BWB Global 2023)
- (France) Tidjane Salaün (BWB Global 2023)
- (Lithuania) Matas Buzelis (BWB Global 2023)
- (Australia) Josh Giddey (BWB Global 2020)
- (Canada) Bennedict Mathurin (BWB Global 2020)
- (Canada) Joshua Primo (BWB Global 2020)
- (Canada) Olivier-Maxence Prosper (BWB Global 2020)
- (China) Cui Yongxi (BWB Global 2020)
- (France) Moussa Diabaté (BWB Global 2020)
- (Germany) Ariel Hukporti (BWB Global 2020)
- (Mali) Adama Sanogo (BWB Global 2020)
- (France) Killian Hayes (BWB Global 2019)
- (Israel) Deni Avdija (BWB Global 2019)
- (Puerto Rico) Julian Strawther (BWB Global 2019)
- (Serbia) Aleksej Pokuševski (BWB Global 2019)
- (Argentina) Leandro Bolmaro (BWB Global 2018)
- (Australia) Josh Green (BWB Global 2018)
- (Cameroon) Christian Koloko (BWB Global 2018)
- (Canada) AJ Lawson (BWB Global 2018)
- (Croatia) Luka Šamanić (BWB Global 2018)
- (Czech Republic) Vít Krejčí (BWB Global 2018)
- (France) Sekou Doumbouya (BWB Global 2018)
- (Mali) N'Faly Dante (BWB Global 2018)
- (Nigeria) Charles Bassey (BWB Global 2018)
- (Serbia) Filip Petrušev (BWB Global 2018)
- (Canada) RJ Barrett (BWB Global 2017)
- (Canada) Luguentz Dort (BWB Global 2017)
- (Canada) Andrew Nembhard (BWB Global 2017)
- (Georgia (country)) Sandro Mamukelashvili (BWB Global 2017)
- (Germany) Isaac Bonga (BWB Global 2017)
- (Lithuania) Ignas Brazdeikis (BWB Global 2017)
- (Australia) Thon Maker (BWB Global 2016)
- (The Bahamas) Deandre Ayton (BWB Global 2016)
- (Canada) Shai Gilgeous-Alexander (BWB Global 2016)
- (Canada) Lindell Wigginton (BWB Global 2016)
- (France) Frank Ntilikina (BWB Global 2016)
- (Germany) Isaiah Hartenstein (BWB Global 2016)
- (Japan) Rui Hachimura (BWB Global 2016)
- (Lithuania) Arnoldas Kulboka (BWB Global 2016)
- (Turkey) Ömer Yurtseven (BWB Global 2016)
- (Australia) Isaac Humphries (BWB Global 2015)
- (Canada) Jamal Murray (BWB Global 2015)
- (Croatia) Dragan Bender (BWB Global 2015)
- (Finland) Lauri Markkanen (BWB Global 2015)
- (Brazil) Bruno Caboclo (BWB Americas 2013)
- (Cameroon) Pascal Siakam (BWB Africa 2012)
- (Cameroon) Joel Embiid (BWB Africa 2011)
- (Dominican Republic) Luis Montero (BWB Americas 2011)
- (Russia) Sergey Karasev (BWB Europe 2010)
- (Senegal) Gorgui Dieng (BWB Africa 2009)
- (Canada) Kelly Olynyk (BWB Americas 2009)
- (Australia) Cameron Bairstow (BWB Asia 2009)
- (Turkey) Enes Kanter (BWB Europe 2008)
- (Montenegro) Nikola Mirotić (BWB Europe 2008)
- (Lithuania) Jonas Valančiūnas (BWB Europe 2008)
- (Democratic Republic of the Congo) Christian Eyenga (BWB Africa 2006)
- (Lithuania) Donatas Motiejūnas (BWB Europe 2006)
- (France) Alexis Ajinça (BWB Europe 2005)
- (France) Nicolas Batum (BWB Europe 2005)
- (Lithuania) Martynas Andriuškevičius (BWB Europe 2004)
- (Italy) Marco Belinelli (BWB Europe 2004)
- (Venezuela) Greivis Vásquez (BWB Americas 2004)
- (Nigeria) Solomon Alabi (BWB Africa 2004)
- (Senegal) Hamady N'Diaye (BWB Africa 2004)
- (Cameroon) Luc Mbah a Moute (BWB Africa 2003)
- (Italy) Andrea Bargnani (BWB Europe 2003)
- (Israel) Omri Casspi (BWB Europe 2003)
- (Italy) Luigi Datome (BWB Europe 2003)
- (Italy) Danilo Gallinari (BWB Europe 2003)
- (Spain) Marc Gasol (BWB Europe 2003)
- (France) Johan Petro (BWB Europe 2003)
Have been drafted by NBA teams
- (South Sudan) Khaman Maluach (BWB Global 2023)
- (Senegal) Khalifa Diop (BWB Global 2019)
- (France) Juhann Begarin (BWB Europe 2018)
- (Nigeria) Chukwudiebere Maduabum (BWB Africa 2010)
- (Iran) Arsalan Kazemi (BWB Asia 2007)
Have been regularly involved as staff
- (United States) Lance Blanks
- (Canada) Samuel Dalembert
- (United Kingdom) Luol Deng
- (Senegal) DeSagana Diop
- (United States) Alex English
- (Senegal) Amadou Fall
- (Dominican Republic) Al Horford
- (United States) Melvin Hunt
- (Russia) Andrei Kirilenko
- (United States) Kyle Korver
- (United States) Bob Lanier
- (Democratic Republic of the Congo) Dikembe Mutombo
- (Slovenia) Boštjan Nachbar
- (Serbia) Marin Sedlaček
- (France) Ronny Turiaf
- (Nigeria) Masai Ujiri
