= Masai Ujiri =

Nigerian-Canadian sports executive (born 1970)

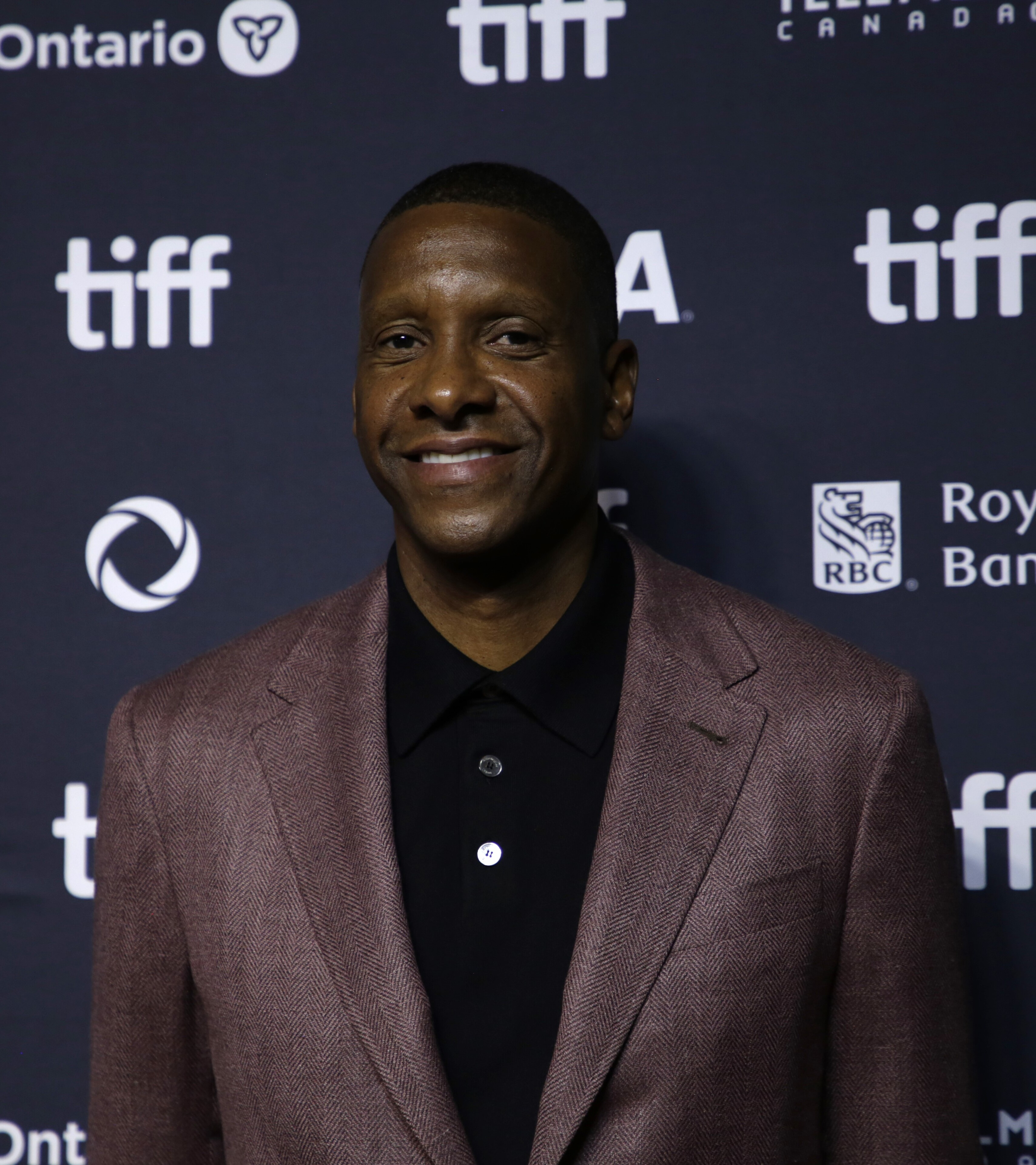
- Ujiri in 2025 at TIFF

Dallas Mavericks
- Title: President
- League: NBA

Personal information
- Born: July 7, 1970 (age 56) Bournemouth, England
- Listed height: 6 ft 5 in (1.96 m)

Career information
- High school: Nathan Hale (Seattle, Washington)
- College: Bismarck State (1993–1995); Montana State Billings (1995)
- Playing career: 1991–2002
- Position: Guard

Career history
- 1991–1992: Solent Stars
- 1996–1997: Derby Rams
- 1997–1999: Solent Stars
- 1998: Tournai-Estaimpuis
- 1999: Hemel Royals
- 2000: BC Nokia
- 2000–2001: Tournai-Estaimpuis

Career highlights
- As executive: NBA champion (2019); NBA Executive of the Year (2013)

Michael Masai Ujiri OC (born July 7, 1970) is a Canadian professional basketball executive and former player who is the president of the Dallas Mavericks of the National Basketball Association (NBA).

Ujiri was born in the United Kingdom to Nigerian and Kenyan parents and was raised in Nigeria. After a modest professional playing career in Europe, Ujiri became a scout in 2002, first for the Orlando Magic and then the Denver Nuggets. In 2008, he joined the backroom staff of the Toronto Raptors. Ujiri returned to the Nuggets in 2010 as general manager and executive vice president of basketball operations, and helped turn the team's fortunes around, returning them to the playoffs. As a result, he was named the NBA Executive of the Year in 2013.

The following season, Ujiri returned to the Raptors as general manager. In the summer of 2016, Masai Ujiri relinquished his title as general manager to Jeff Weltman and accepted the position of president of basketball operations. Weltman was later succeeded by Bobby Webster as general manager a year later. As president, Ujiri worked to usher in a period of sustained success, helping the team win its first NBA championship in 2019. In 2025, Ujiri and the Raptors agreed to part ways. In 2026, he joined the ownership group of the WNBA expansion team the Toronto Tempo and joined the Mavericks as team President.

== Early life ==
Ujiri was born in Bournemouth, England, to a Nigerian father and a Kenyan mother. His parents were foreign students in England. With the family moving back to Nigeria when he was two years old, he grew up in Zaria, Nigeria. Ujiri's father, a hospital administrator and nursing educator, is an Isoko from Aviara in Isoko South Local Government Area of Delta state, while his mother, a doctor, is a Kenyan from Machakos County. He originally played association football as a youth before stating his interest in basketball as a 13-year-old playing with friends on outdoor basketball courts in northern Nigeria. This interest was fed by American sports magazines and VHS tapes of NBA games or basketball movies. He admired Hakeem Olajuwon, a former NBA star who is also Nigerian.

Entering high school, his parents allowed him to pursue his dream of playing college basketball and join a team in one of Europe's top leagues. He left Nigeria for the United States to play for Nathan Hale High School in Seattle while staying with a Nigerian family. After a stint overseas, Ujiri played two years of basketball at Bismarck State College, a junior college in North Dakota. Masai averaged 12.9 points and 6.8 rebounds per game as a freshman while leading the Mystics to a 23-8 record, the most victories in school history. As a sophomore, Masai averaged 16.2 points, 5.0 rebounds, and 5.5 assists while garnering All-Mon-Dak Conference first-team and All-Region XIII honors. Masai then transferred to Montana State University Billings, but left after one semester without appearing in any games and returned to England to begin a pro career.

== Playing career ==
Ujiri spent his entire professional playing career in Europe. Before attending college, Ujiri played one season with the Solent Stars in the National Basketball League Division 3, then the fourth tier of English basketball. Ujiri and his team won the title that season with a 20–2 record.

Following his collegiate career, Ujiri played a season for the Derby Rams in England. He then returned to Solent Stars, playing two seasons either side of a short stint with Belgian side Tournai-Estaimpuis, followed by just one appearance with Hemel Royals. Ujiri later spent three months in Finland with BC Nokia, where he played two preseason games before being waived. He last played in Denmark.

== Executive career ==
After ending a professional playing career in 2002, Ujiri worked as a youth coach in Nigeria. During an NBA summer league game in Boston, he met David Thorpe, who eventually introduced him to college coaches. In 2003, Ujiri was accompanying Uche Nsonwu-Amadi, a young Nigerian player, to a draft tryout in Orlando when he impressed Magic scouting director Gary Brokaw, who then introduced Ujiri to coach Doc Rivers and GM John Gabriel. Ujiri then became an unpaid scout for the NBA's Orlando Magic, paying his own way when he had to and sharing rooms with scouts or players when he could.

Jeff Weltman, then a young executive with the Denver Nuggets, introduced Ujiri to Nuggets general manager Kiki Vandeweghe, who then hired Ujiri on salary as an international scout. After four seasons there, he was hired away by Bryan Colangelo of the Toronto Raptors as their Director of Global Scouting. Ujiri became the Raptors' assistant general manager in 2008.

=== Denver Nuggets ===
Ujiri returned to the Nuggets in 2010, as general manager and executive vice president in charge of basketball operations. With this post, Ujiri became the first African general manager in major American sports.

Ujiri was instrumental in the package that sent all-star Carmelo Anthony to the New York Knicks for Danilo Gallinari, Wilson Chandler, Raymond Felton, Timofey Mozgov, and several draft picks. One of those draft picks would turn out to be Jamal Murray from the 2016 NBA Draft.

After putting together a Nuggets’ roster that won 57 games, the most in Denver's NBA history, Ujiri was named the 2013 NBA Executive of the Year. He is the only non-American ever to win the award.

=== Toronto Raptors ===
On May 31, 2013, Ujiri signed a 5-year, $15 million deal to become executive vice president and general manager of the Toronto Raptors, replacing Colangelo in that capacity. Two of his first moves as Raptors GM was to trade away Andrea Bargnani to the New York Knicks and Rudy Gay to the Sacramento Kings. During Ujiri's tenure as general manager, the Raptors, led by the backcourt duo of Kyle Lowry and DeMar DeRozan, returned to the playoffs in 2014. On April 19, 2014, at a fan rally prior to Game 1 of the first-round Eastern Conference playoff series against the Brooklyn Nets, Ujiri shouted, "Fuck Brooklyn!" to the gathered crowd from the stage. Ujiri apologized during halftime of Game 1, stating: "wrong choice of words. I apologize to kids out there and to the Brooklyn guys." NBA Commissioner Adam Silver fined Ujiri $25,000.

On April 18, 2015, at a fan rally before the playoff series between the Washington Wizards and the Raptors, in response to comments from Wizards guard Paul Pierce that the Raptors don't have the "it" factor, Ujiri shouted to the gathered crowd, "We don't give a s--t about 'it!'" NBA Commissioner Adam Silver fined Ujiri $35,000 and the Raptors organization another $25,000. Ujiri apologized for his comments saying, "I will choose my words more carefully in the future."

Under Ujiri, the Raptors became a consistent playoff team every year, winning five Division titles and finishing the 2017–18 regular season with the best regular season record in the Eastern Conference. He also helped the team reach the Eastern Conference Finals for the first time in franchise history in 2016, where his contract was extended to act as the team's president. His title as general manager was then transferred to Jeff Weltman. After Weltman left the organization to join the Orlando Magic in 2017, Bobby Webster was named as the team's new general manager, and began reshaping the Raptors roster after suffering consecutive second-round eliminations in 2017 and 2018 (both four-game sweeps), all three playoff defeats at the hands of the Cleveland Cavaliers, led by LeBron James.

Ujiri fired head coach Dwane Casey shortly after their 2018 second round exit to LeBron James and the Cavs (despite Casey being named Coach of the Year), promoting assistant Nick Nurse to head coach, conducted the high-profile trade of DeRozan for Kawhi Leonard and Danny Green later that summer, and acquired Marc Gasol for Jonas Valanciunas before the trade deadline. The DeRozan-for-Leonard trade was initially controversial since DeRozan was the longest-tenured Raptor and fan favourite while Leonard had spent most of the 2017–18 season injured, along with his demand to be traded to a Los Angeles-based team only. However, the move paid off as the Raptors went on to win the 2019 NBA championship, their first title in the history of their franchise, and Leonard was named NBA Finals MVP.

On June 27, 2025, Ujiri and the Raptors agreed to part ways, ending his 12-year run with the organization.

==== 2019 NBA Finals incident ====
On June 13, 2019, just after the Toronto Raptors had clinched a 4–2 series win over the Golden State Warriors in the 2019 NBA Finals, Ujiri was captured on video in an altercation with an Alameda County Sheriff deputy. Sgt. Ray Kelly, a spokesman for the Sheriff's Department, alleged that Ujiri failed to show proper credentials for access to the floor. Sgt. Kelly further alleged that when stopped, Ujiri had shoved a sheriff's deputy, that the deputy had made contact in response, and that Ujiri shoved the deputy back and made contact with his face. Several bystanders and Oracle Arena security personnel intervened to separate the two. After a tense staredown between the men, Ujiri was restrained from approaching the deputy. Raptors player Kyle Lowry then came over to Ujiri and escorted him onto the court to celebrate with the team. Alternate angles of the incident appear to show Ujiri shouting in the direction of the deputy with his arm around Lowry after making his way onto the court.

The Sheriff's Department did not release body camera footage depicting the start of the incident and announced that their footage had happened to "switch off" when Ujiri allegedly struck the officer. Warriors season ticketholder Greg Wiener, who was seated near the altercation, alleged that the deputy used excessive force and initiated physical contact, while two other fans (Ben Baller and Lucas Abrenica) that were sitting within 10 feet of the incident also disputed the deputy's version of events. In the videos, Ujiri can be seen with game credentials in his hand. However, the NBA had released a media advisory prior to the conclusion of the game stating that only personnel with gold armbands would be allowed on the court due to a visiting team winning. Many of the gold armbands were visible on photographers and executives on the court (including members of the Raptors ownership), but are not visible in any angles of Ujiri during the incident.

Following the altercation, the Alameda County Sheriff's Office stated that it would be recommending charges of battery against Ujiri. The deputy involved claimed to have suffered a concussion from the incident and sought $75,000 US for his alleged injuries. The investigation ended on September 21. Following a private meeting on October 21, 2019, with Ujiri, his attorneys and Assistant District Attorney Terry Wiley, which was held at the Sheriff's Department, Assistant District Attorney Teresa Drenick announced that the District Attorney's office would not take further action in connection with the incident.

Deputy Alan Strickland's body camera footage was released in August 2020. The footage showed Ujiri reaching for his game credentials, but neither the purple trophy credential or the yellow armband credential needed to access the court postgame is seen before the deputy shoved Ujiri twice in the chest. The footage revealed that the deputy, not Ujiri, initiated the physical contact.

On October 6, 2020, Strickland's lawyers filed a motion to dismiss a counterclaim to a lawsuit from Ujiri. A Zoom hearing was scheduled for November 17.

Ujiri subsequently dropped his countersuit against Alameda County sheriff's deputy Alan Strickland. The sheriff's deputy dropped his lawsuit against Ujiri on February 10, 2021.

=== Toronto Tempo ===
On March 31, 2026, Ujiri joined the ownership group of the Toronto Tempo, the Women's National Basketball Association franchise that began playing in the league's 2026 season. The ownership group is led by businessman Larry Tanenbaum, a board member of Toronto Raptors parent company Maple Leaf Sports & Entertainment who worked closely with Ujiri during his time there.

As part of his role with the franchise, Ujiri and the Tempo plan to jointly launch a global coaching mentorship program, called Tempo Rising, that will offer professional support to emerging women-identifying and non-binary basketball coaches.

=== Dallas Mavericks ===
On May 4, 2026, Ujiri was hired by the Dallas Mavericks as team President and Alternate Governor.

== Activism ==
Ujiri, then a scout for the Nuggets, founded Giants of Africa in 2003 with the goal of discovering basketball talent. The first Giants of Africa camp was held in Nigeria.

Ujiri has served as director of the NBA's Basketball Without Borders Africa program, which promotes basketball throughout the continent. He also conducts two camps, one for the top 50 players of Nigeria, which is sponsored by Nestle Milo, and another for African big men, which Ujiri sponsors himself with help from Nike. Ujiri and Basketball Without Borders are profiled in Hubert Davis's 2016 documentary film Giants of Africa.

Ujiri has taken personal offense to former President Donald Trump's comments about immigrants from places like Haiti and his homeland Nigeria, which Trump referred to as "shitholes". Ujiri opined that President Trump's words did not demonstrate inspiring leadership and were unfair to the nations and peoples to which Trump referred.

On November 28, 2018, Ujiri received the first-ever President's Peace Medal presented by the YMCA of Greater Toronto during Peace Week. He received the honor alongside two YMCA Peace Medal honourees, Toronto police constable Dale Swift and mental health activist Loizza Aquino.

In February 2020, Ujiri accompanied Canadian Prime Minister Justin Trudeau on an official visit to various African nations, including Ethiopia and Senegal. Ujiri appeared on behalf of sport charity Right To Play at an event in the Senegalese capital, Dakar. During that same trip, Trudeau and Ujiri made a surprise visit to thank the Canadian troops in Kuwait.

In December 2019, Masai Ujiri launched a new philanthropic platform called "That's Humanity" that debuted with a personal manifesto and video titled “What does humanity mean to you?”

== Honours ==
He was named an Officer of the Order of Canada in 2023.

== Personal life ==
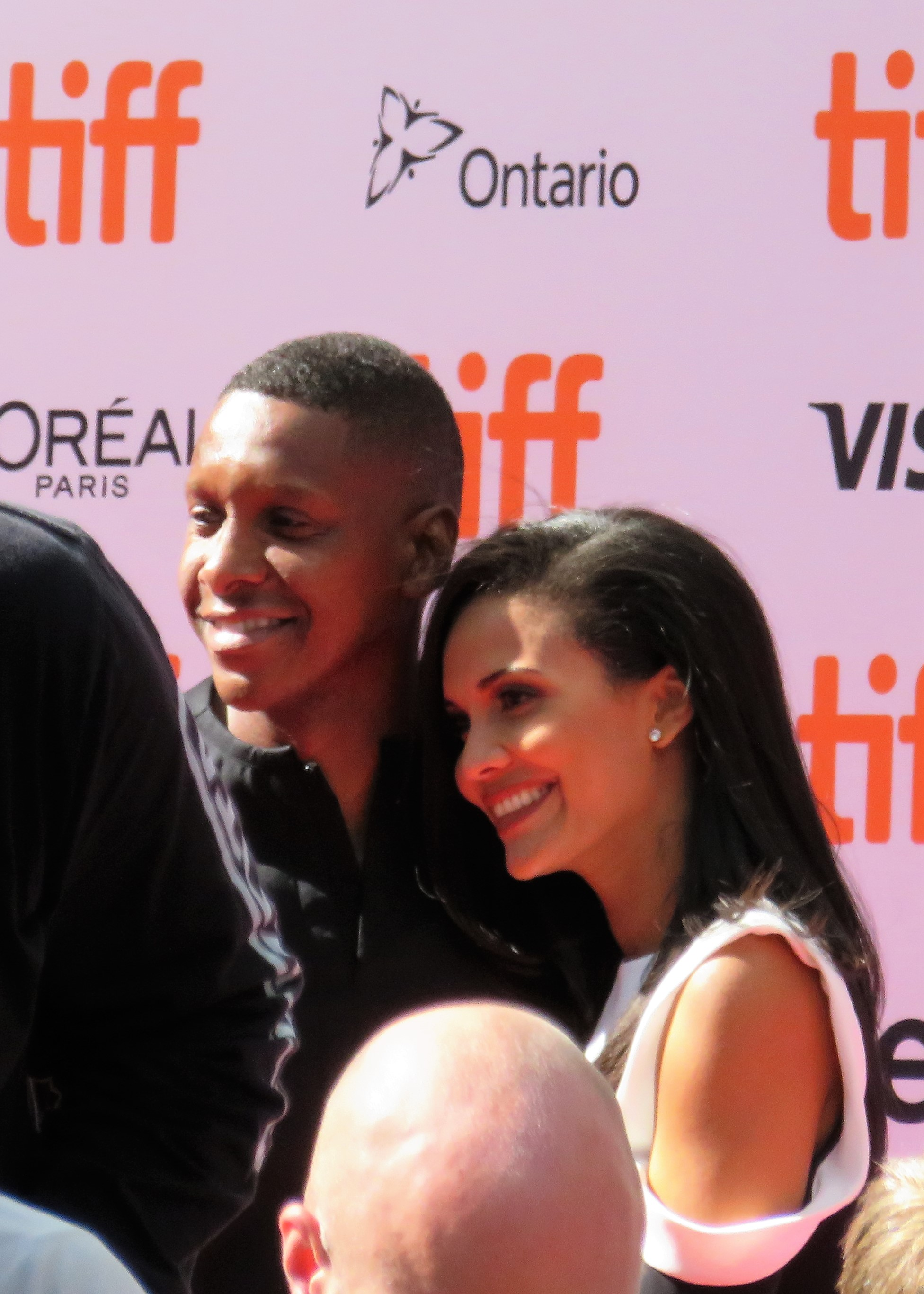
Ramatu and Masai at the premiere of The Carter Effect at the Toronto International Film Festival in 2017

Ujiri is married to fashion model Ramatu Ujiri; she was born in Sierra Leone to Sierra Leonean and Guinean parents and moved to the United States as a teenager. They have two children.

As of 2021, Ujiri is a naturalized Canadian citizen.
