= Football Mogul =

Sports simulation video game series

- Logo for the release of Football Mogul 16.
- Genre(s): Sports simulation (American football)
- Developer(s): Sports Mogul (previously known as Infinite Monkey Systems)
- Publisher(s): Sports Mogul; Previous: WizardWorks; Enlight Software
- Platform(s): Microsoft Windows
- First release: Football Mogul; 1999
- Latest release: Football Mogul 21; 2020

Football Mogul is a series of sports-simulation games that allows a player to play the owner, head coach or general manager of a National Football League (pro American football) franchise. The most recent version is Football Mogul 21.

The original Football Mogul was released on March 30, 1999, a year after the release of the first Baseball Mogul.

== Games ==
Title	Year	Developer	Publisher	Ref
Football Mogul	1999	Infinite Monkey Systems	WizardWorks	
Football Mogul 2003	2002	Sports Mogul	Sports Mogul	
Football Mogul 2005	2004	Sports Mogul	Sports Mogul	
Football Mogul 2006	2005	Sports Mogul	Sports Mogul	
Football Mogul 2007	2006	Sports Mogul	Enlight Software	
Football Mogul 2008	2007	Sports Mogul	Sports Mogul	
Football Mogul 2009	2008	Sports Mogul	Sports Mogul	
Football Mogul 2010	2009	Sports Mogul	Sports Mogul	
Football Mogul 2011	2010	Sports Mogul		
Football Mogul 2012	2011	Sports Mogul		
Football Mogul 2013	2012	Sports Mogul		
Football Mogul 2014	2013	Sports Mogul		
Football Mogul 15	2014	Sports Mogul		
Football Mogul 16	2015	Sports Mogul		
Football Mogul 17	2016	Sports Mogul		
Football Mogul 18	2017	Sports Mogul		
Football Mogul 19	2018	Sports Mogul		
Football Mogul 20	2019	Sports Mogul		
Football Mogul 21	2020	Sports Mogul		

== See also ==
- List of simulation video games
