= Clay Dreslough =

American video game designer

- Born: Boston, Massachusetts, U.S.
- Occupation: Game designer
- Spouse: Deirdre Dreslough (m. 1999)
- Children: 1
- Writing career
- Notable works: Baseball Mogul, Football Mogul

Clay Dreslough is an American video game designer. He is the creator of the Baseball Mogul and Football Mogul computer sports games, and is the co-founder and president of Sports Mogul, Inc.

== Professional life ==
Dreslough's design and programming credits include the Tony La Russa Baseball series, Microsoft Baseball, and MLB Slugfest Loaded. He has worked as a programmer, lead designer, and executive producer. He founded the game development studio Sports Mogul, which produces the Baseball Mogul series, Baseball Mogul Online, and the Football Mogul series.

Speaking to The Escapist in 2006, Dreslough spoke about the effects of Wal-Mart on his studio Sports Mogul, saying that most of their profits were made online, and that they did not depend on selling their games in Wal-Mart.

== Baseball research ==
Clay Dreslough has been a member of 'SABR', the Society for American Baseball Research, since 1995. He contributed to the SABR style manual. Dreslough created Defense-Independent Component ERA (DICE), a baseball statistic based on component ERA that evaluates defense independent pitching. Dreslough used DICE in his Baseball Mogul series.

In 1999, Dreslough invented a new format for the MLB postseason. After an organized letter-writing campaign to the baseball commissioner, this format was adopted for the 2012 season.
