= Carlos Santana (baseball) =

Dominican–American baseball player (born 1986)

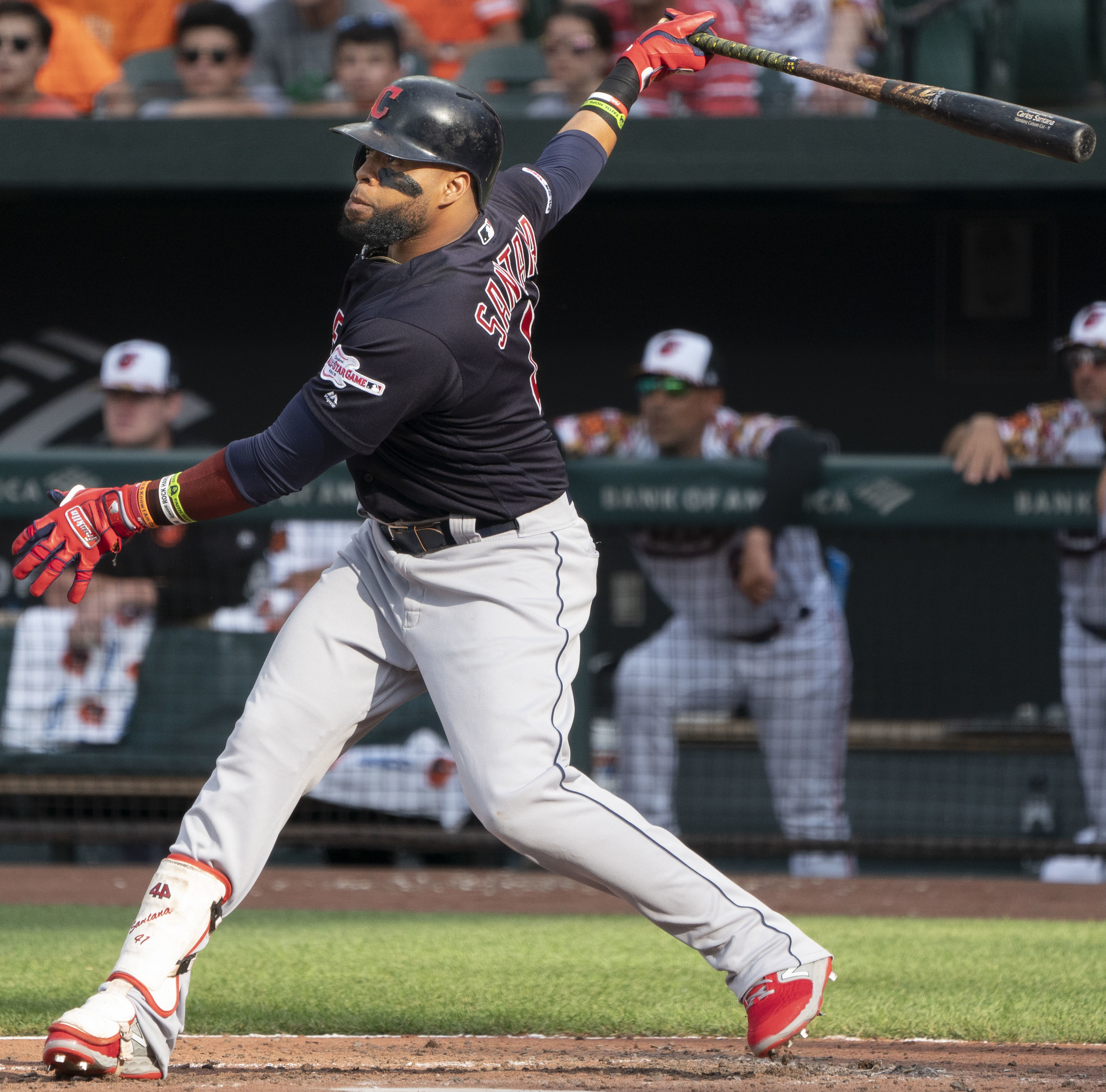
- Santana with the Cleveland Indians in 2019

Free agent
- First baseman / Catcher
- Born: April 8, 1986 (age 40); Santo Domingo, Dominican Republic
- Bats: Switch Throws: Right

MLB debut
- June 11, 2010, for the Cleveland Indians

MLB statistics (through 2026 season)
- Batting average: .240
- Home runs: 335
- Runs batted in: 1,136
- Stats at Baseball Reference

Teams
- Cleveland Indians (2010–2017); Philadelphia Phillies (2018); Cleveland Indians (2019–2020); Kansas City Royals (2021–2022); Seattle Mariners (2022); Pittsburgh Pirates (2023); Milwaukee Brewers (2023); Minnesota Twins (2024); Cleveland Guardians (2025); Chicago Cubs (2025); Arizona Diamondbacks (2026)

Career highlights and awards
- All-Star (2019); Gold Glove Award (2024); Silver Slugger Award (2019)
Medals
Men's baseball
Representing Dominican Republic
World Baseball Classic
Gold medal – first place	2013 San Francisco	Team
Bronze medal – third place	2026 Miami	Team`

Carlos Santana (born April 8, 1986) is a Dominican–American professional baseball first baseman and catcher who is a free agent. He has previously played in Major League Baseball (MLB) for the Cleveland Indians / Guardians, Philadelphia Phillies, Kansas City Royals, Seattle Mariners, Pittsburgh Pirates, Milwaukee Brewers, Minnesota Twins, Chicago Cubs, and Arizona Diamondbacks. He plays with the Dominican Republic national team internationally, winning the gold medal in the 2013 World Baseball Classic. Santana was both an All-Star selection and Silver Slugger Award winner in 2019 with Cleveland. In 2024, he won a Gold Glove with Minnesota.

== Early life ==
Born in Santo Domingo, Santana has five sisters and two brothers. Their parents began divorce proceedings when he was 15 years old. Santana and his sisters lived with his mother after the divorce, which afforded him the opportunity to play baseball, meanwhile emerging as a father figure to his sisters. He played baseball with his neighbors in a 5-on-5 format, and, instead of swinging with bats, they used baseball caps. After signing with the Los Angeles Dodgers, Santana received a bonus worth $75,000, taking a part of the money to buy his mother a house.

== Professional career ==
=== Minor leagues ===
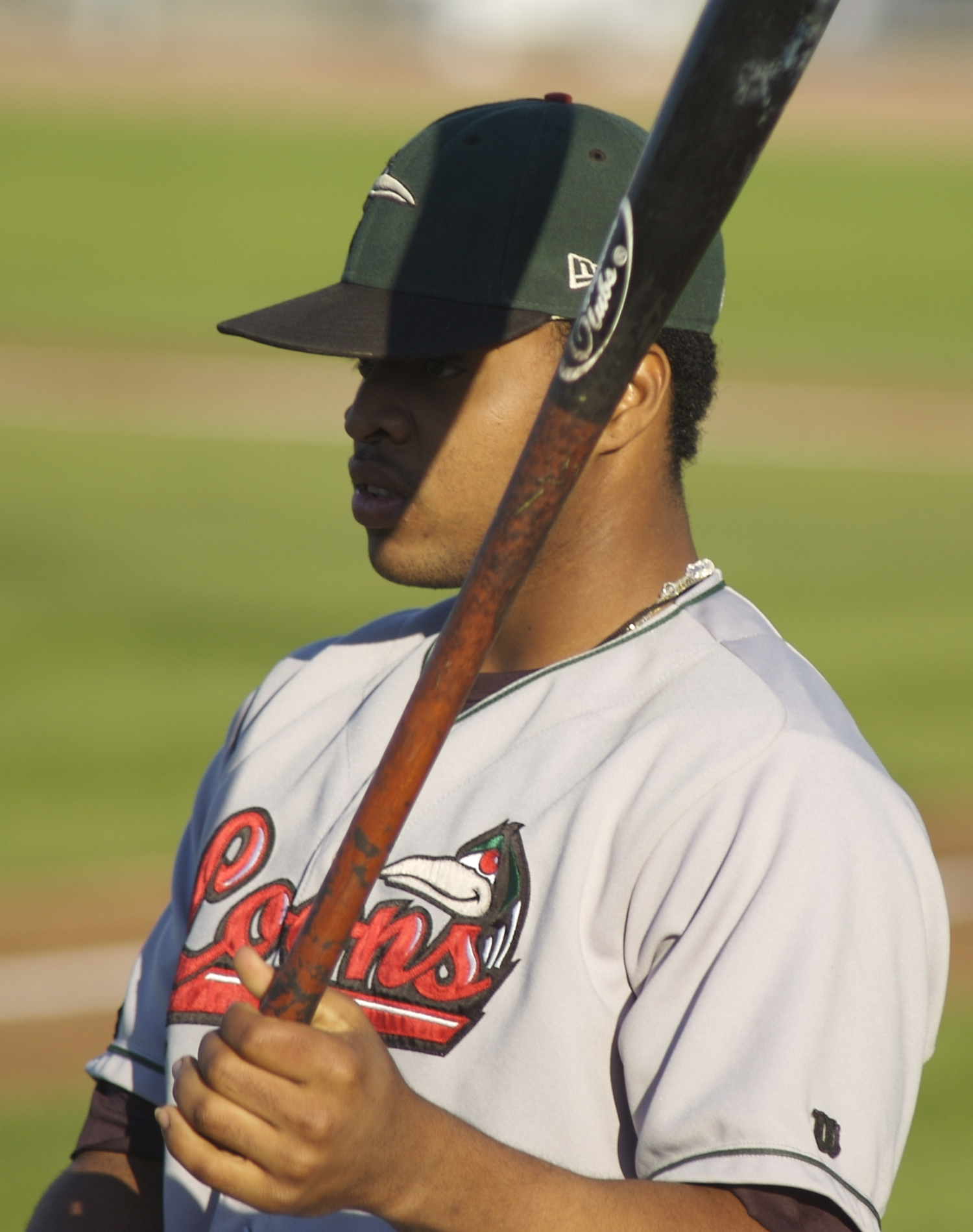
Santana with the Great Lakes Loons in 2007

Santana signed with the Los Angeles Dodgers in 2005. He began his professional baseball career with the Gulf Coast League Dodgers, the rookie-level minor league affiliate. He played 32 games in 2005 and batted .295. He played primarily at third base, while also appearing at catcher, second base, in left field, and in right field.

On July 26, 2008, the Dodgers traded Santana and pitcher Jon Meloan to the Cleveland Indians for third baseman Casey Blake. Santana appeared in 130 games combined in 2008 with the Akron Aeros, Inland Empire 66ers of San Bernardino, and Kinston Indians during the 2008 season, with the majority at San Bernardino and Kinston at the Class A-Advanced level, and played primarily catcher. On offense, he hit .326, amassed .431 on-base percentage (OBP), .568 slugging percentage (SLG), .999 on-base plus slugging (OPS), 125 runs scored, 21 home runs, collected 117 runs batted in (RBI), 89 bases on balls (BB) and 85 strikeouts. Santana was named California League Most Valuable Player (MVP). He also earned mention as Hi-A Player of the Year and made the Hi-A All-Star team, California League All-Star team, and Baseball America's All-Star second team.

Entering the 2009 season, Santana was Baseball America's choice as the top prospect in the Indians organization. Assigned to the Aeros of the AA-level Eastern League, he played in 130 games, batted .290, 413 OBP, .530 SLG, 23 home runs, 90 BB and 83 strikeouts. Behind the plate, he placed fifth in the league with a 30 percent caught stealing clip while helping to lead the club to a Southern Division title. In the Eastern League All-Star Game, he was named the starting catcher for the Southern Division and participated in the All-Star Futures Game at Busch Stadium in St. Louis. Santana also won the Eastern League MVP Award and was named the Indians' 2009 Minor League Player of the Year − also known as the "Lou Boudreau Award".

Baseball America ranked Santana as the organization's top prospect for the second time entering the 2010 season. The club assigned him to the Triple-A Columbus Clippers, where he hit .316 with 13 home runs and 51 RBI in 57 games prior to his first major league callup.

=== Cleveland Indians ===
==== 2010−11 ====
The Indians promoted Santana on June 11, 2010, to make his MLB debut. He batted third in the order, making him the first Tribe player to debut hitting third since Jim Norris in 1977, according to the Elias Sports Bureau. Santana recorded his first major league hit in his second game, on June 12, 2010, a two-out, two-RBI double in the second inning off Washington Nationals pitcher J. D. Martin. In his next at-bat, Santana hit his first major league home run to right field in the bottom of the fifth inning.

On August 2, 2010, Santana was injured in a game at Fenway Park while defending home plate against Boston Red Sox baserunner Ryan Kalish. While attempting to dislodge the ball from Santana's mitt, Kalish slid into his left knee, bending it to the side. Santana was unable to walk off the field and had to be removed on a cart. Tests revealed that Santana had a high-grade sprain of his LCL and a hyperextension of his left knee. The injury ended Santana's rookie season.

Santana started a triple play against the Chicago White Sox on April 3, 2011 with a diving catch off of an Alexei Ramírez bunt. On April 29, 2011, Santana hit his first major league grand slam, a walk-off to defeat the Detroit Tigers, 9−5.

Santana finished 2011, which was his first full season in the major leagues, with 27 home runs, setting a club record for home runs hit by a switch hitter, and played 66 games at first base. He also hit 79 RBI, 35 doubles, and added 97 walks. He was one of four hitters in 2011 to reach 25 home runs, 35 doubles, and 90 walks, joining Miguel Cabrera, Prince Fielder, and Joey Votto.

==== 2012 ====
On April 10, 2012, the Indians signed Santana to a five-year, $21 million contract with a club option for the 2017 season. In the eighth inning of a May 25 game versus the Chicago White Sox, Santana sustained a hit in the mask from a foul tip and was removed from the game due to experiencing dizziness. He was subsequently placed on the seven-day disabled list with a concussion. Heading into the All-Star break, Santana was hitting .221, five home runs and 30 RBI in 69 games. Manager Manny Acta spoke of the hopes the Indians had for their catcher but admitted he was not hitting "the way we expected him to hit."

When Santana hit a home run in a July 18 game versus the Tampa Bay Rays, it was his first since May 15. He later added on a single and finished the game with a season-high four RBI, his first multi-RBI game since May 11. "I know Santana feels so much better to get that monkey off his back. That power drought had been weighing on him", Acta remarked after the game. Santana matched a career with five RBI in a September 23 game against the Kansas City Royals. He hit two home runs in the game, his third career multi-home run game and first of the season since April 8.

==== 2013−2016 ====
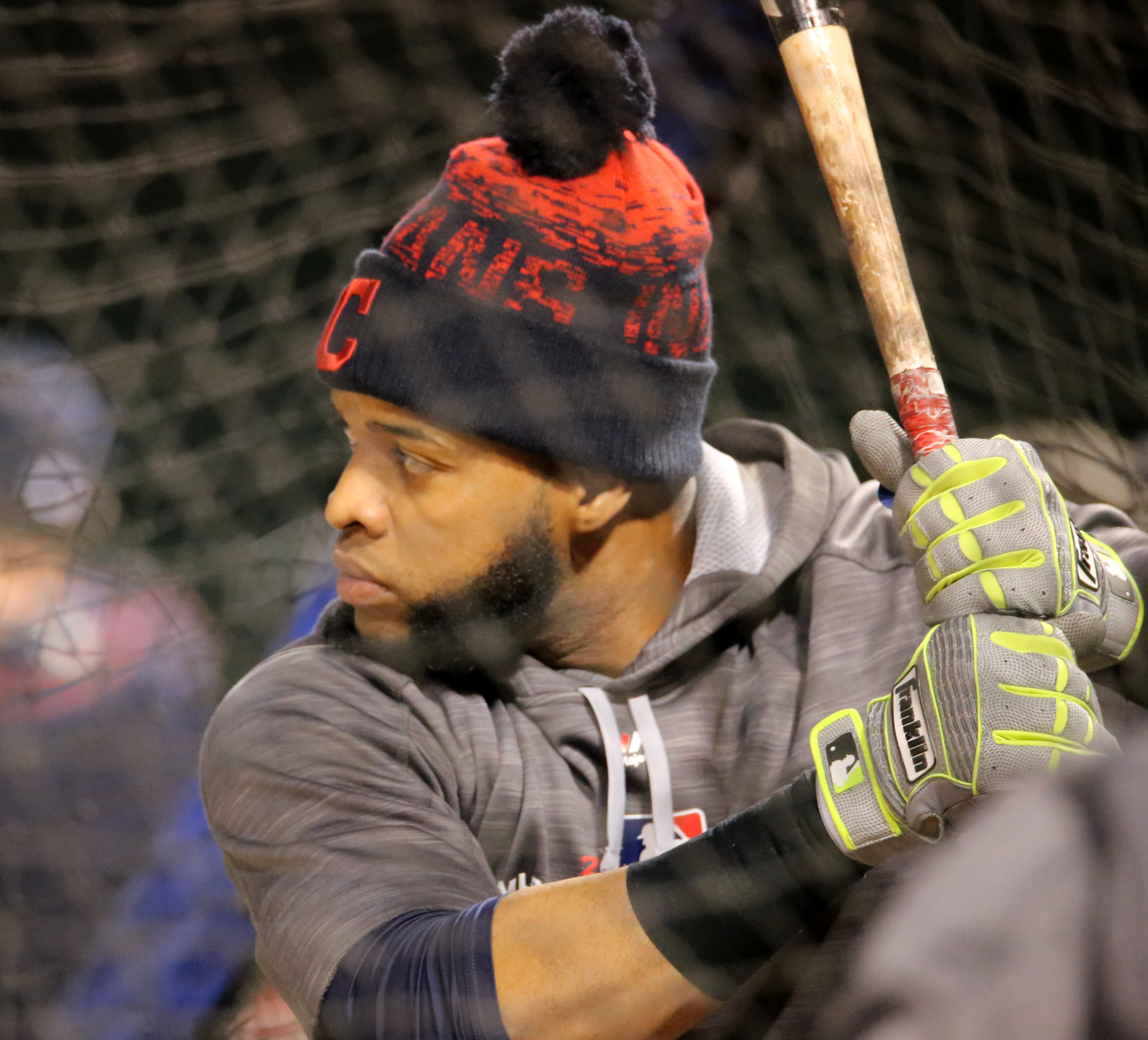
Santana at batting practice during the 2016 World Series

In 2013, Santana and the newly promoted Yan Gomes split the catching duties nearly evenly, with Santana seeing significant time at first base and designated hitter when Gomes was catching. With the emergence of Gomes' defensive prowess, Santana saw less and less time at catcher.

Santana started 2014 playing primarily third base, a position he had not played since single-A, with some time at catcher. After a stint on the 7-day concussion DL in early June, he played exclusively at first base for the remainder of the season and into 2015. In 2014, he reached a career-high 113 walks while also leading the major leagues, and placed tenth in the AL with 241 times on base. He became the first switch hitter since Lance Berkman in 2004 to achieve at least 25 home runs with 100 walks in the same season, and the fifth Indians switch hitter to do accordingly.

On September 21, 2016, Santana hit his 150th career home run, doing so against the Kansas City Royals. During the regular season, Santana batted .259, 34 home runs, 87 RBI and .865 OPS. He produced 30 home runs and 68 RBI when batting left-handed. Santana homered twice in the 2016 American League Championship Series versus the Toronto Blue Jays. He also recorded the final out of the Series by catching a Troy Tulowitzki pop-up in foul territory, sending the Indians to the World Series. The Chicago Cubs defeated Cleveland in the World Series in seven games. The Indians exercised their $12 million option for 2017.

==== 2017 ====
After the Indians acquired Edwin Encarnación in free agency prior to the 2017 season, he took over as the team's designated hitter, and Santana played primarily first base. During the first 84 games of the season, he hit .238 with 10 home runs. In August and September, the club won an American League-record 22 games in a row, and Santana hit .365/.484/.689 during the streak. He had hit 13 home runs and 313/.429/.596 through that point in the second half of the season. On September 10 versus the Baltimore Orioles, he drove in his 585th run, passing Omar Vizquel as the Indians' career RBI leader among switch hitters. Overall in 2017, he batted .259/.363/.445, 112 OPS+, 90 runs scored, 23 home runs, 79 RBI, 88 BB, 94 strikeouts, and five stolen bases.

Santana placed fourth in the AL in walks and seventh in times on base (242). With significant improvement on defense, he led AL first basemen in total zone runs (13) and assists (95), was second in double plays (129), fourth in putouts (1,055), and fifth in fielding percentage (.996). The Indians won an AL-best 102 games for the regular season, but were defeated by the wild-card qualifying New York Yankees in the ALDS. He won his first career Wilson Defensive Player of the Year Award at first base, given to the top defensive player in the major leagues at each position. He was also named a finalist for the American League Rawlings Gold Glove Award at first base.

=== Philadelphia Phillies ===
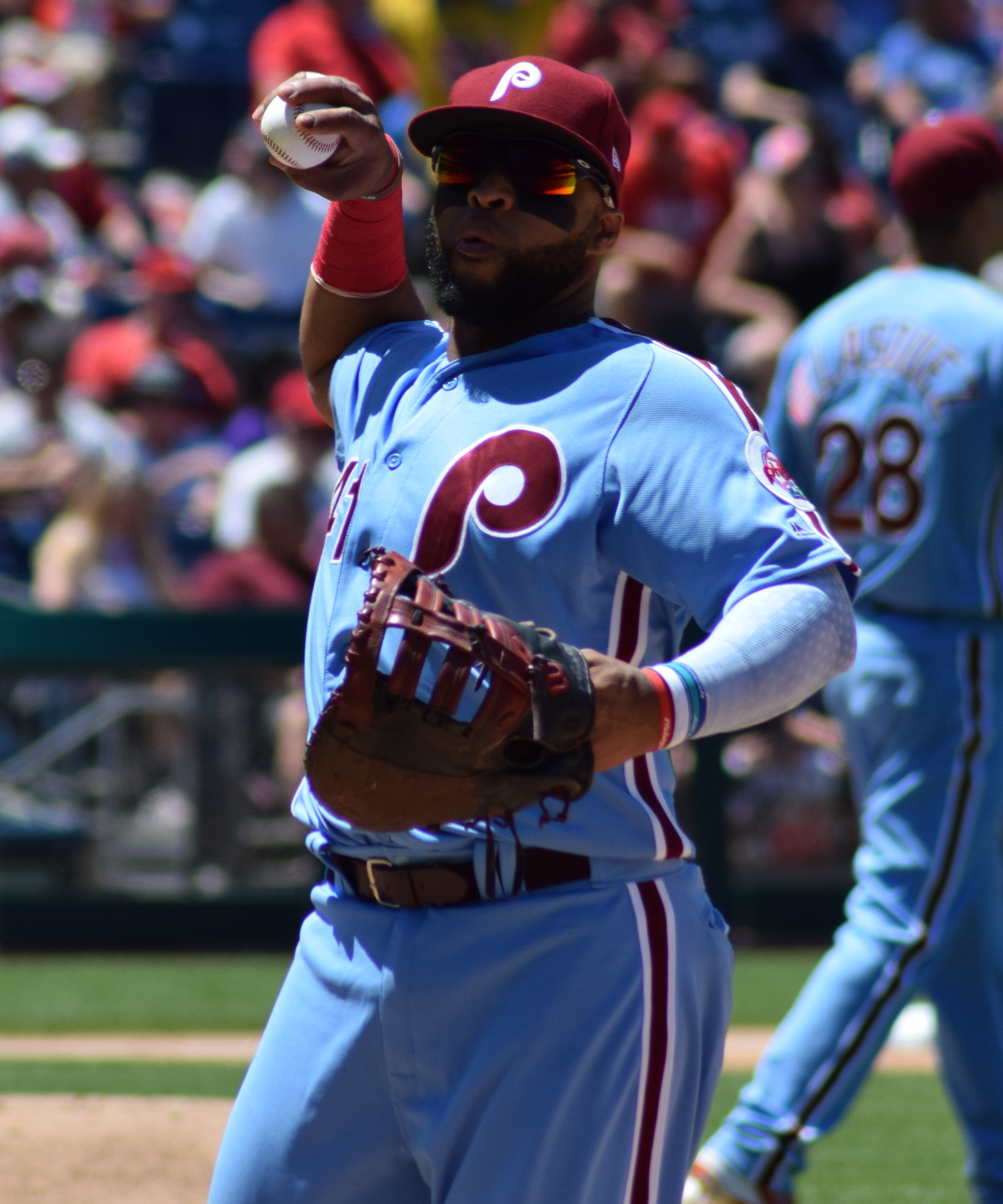
Santana with the Phillies in 2018

On November 2, 2017, Santana filed for free agency. On December 20, he signed a three-year contract with the Philadelphia Phillies that included a team option for the 2021 season. The value of the three guaranteed seasons was $60 million. Santana reached 1,000 hits for his career on April 7, 2018, with a three-run home run in a 20−1 win versus the Miami Marlins at Citizens Bank Park. For the season, he batted .229 and had the lowest batting average on balls in play (.231) of all major league players, and was second in the major leagues in walks per strikeout (1.18). He placed second in the National League in walks (110), hit 24 home runs, 86 RBI, and scored 82 runs.

In March 2019, ESPN.com reported that, in September 2018, Santana, frustrated with the team's nonchalance amidst a long losing streak, destroyed a television with a bat in the team's clubhouse at Citizens Bank Park because teammates had been using it to play Fortnite during games.

=== Return to Cleveland ===
On December 3, 2018, the Phillies traded Santana and J. P. Crawford to the Seattle Mariners for Jean Segura, Juan Nicasio, and James Pazos. In a three-team transaction ten days later, the Mariners traded Santana with cash to the Indians, the Indians sent Encarnación and a competitive balance draft pick to the Mariners, Yandy Díaz and Cole Sulser to the Tampa Bay Rays, and the Rays traded Jake Bauers to Cleveland.

Santana hit the 200th home run of his career on April 28, 2019, versus Wade Miley of the Houston Astros. Selected by fan voting in 2019 to his first career MLB All-Star Game, Santana was named the starting first baseman for the American League. He and Indians were hosts for the event played at Progressive Field and he batted cleanup. Santana also competed in the Home Run Derby. On August 11 versus the Minnesota Twins, he hit a game-winning grand slam in a 7–3 outcome to tie the Indians and Twins for first place. The following night, Santana hit a walk-off home run at Progressive Field to defeat the Boston Red Sox, 6–5, that allowed the Indians to reclaim sole possession of first place in the AL Central for the first time since the previous April. Through August 15, Santana homered five times in the seventh inning or later to give the Indians a lead.

Overall with the 2020 Cleveland Indians, Santana batted .199/.349/.350 with 8 home runs and 30 RBIs in 60 games, and led the American League in walks, with 47. The Indians declined their club option on Santana's contract for the 2021 season on October 30, 2020, making Santana a free agent.

=== Kansas City Royals ===
On December 8, 2020, Santana signed a two-year, $17.5 million contract with the Kansas City Royals. He was immediately inserted into the Royals lineup at first base; no player had started more than 55% of the team's games in a season at first base since Eric Hosmer left the franchise after the 2017 season. Santana made 136 starts at first base during the 2021 season, and in 158 games overall, he hit .214/.319/.342 with 19 home runs and 69 RBI for a career-low OPS+ of 80. His wRC+ of 83 was 7th-worst in the league among qualified hitters, although it was better than two of his Royals teammates. His 86 walks were good for sixth in the American League, and were the most by a Royals hitter since José Offerman in 1998. Santana did play a portion of the season with a leg injury, although he was never placed on the injured list.

Santana remained the Royals' first baseman entering the 2022 season. The Royals were 26–45 at the time of his trade away from the organization, and Santana was hitting .216/.349/.341 with four home runs and 21 RBI in 52 games, although in a season in which league-wide offensive numbers were down, his OPS+ was at 98.

=== Seattle Mariners ===
On June 27, 2022, the Royals traded Santana to the Seattle Mariners in exchange for Wyatt Mills and William Fleming. In 79 appearances for the Mariners, Santana batted .192/.293/.400 with 15 home runs and 39 RBI.

=== Pittsburgh Pirates ===
On November 29, 2022, Santana signed a one-year contract with the Pittsburgh Pirates. On June 30, 2023, in a game against the Milwaukee Brewers, Santana hit a walk-off two-run home run into the Allegheny River to win it 8–7. It was the 69th home run hit into the Allegheny River in the history of PNC Park. In 94 appearances for Pittsburgh, Santana batted .235/.321/.412 with 12 home runs, 53 RBI, and six stolen bases.

=== Milwaukee Brewers ===
On July 27, 2023, the Pirates traded Santana to the Milwaukee Brewers in exchange for minor-league shortstop Jhonny Severino. On September 23, Santana hit his 300th career home run off of A. J. Puk of the Miami Marlins. In 52 games for Milwaukee, he batted .249/.314/.459 with 11 home runs and 33 RBI. He became a free agent following the season.

=== Minnesota Twins ===
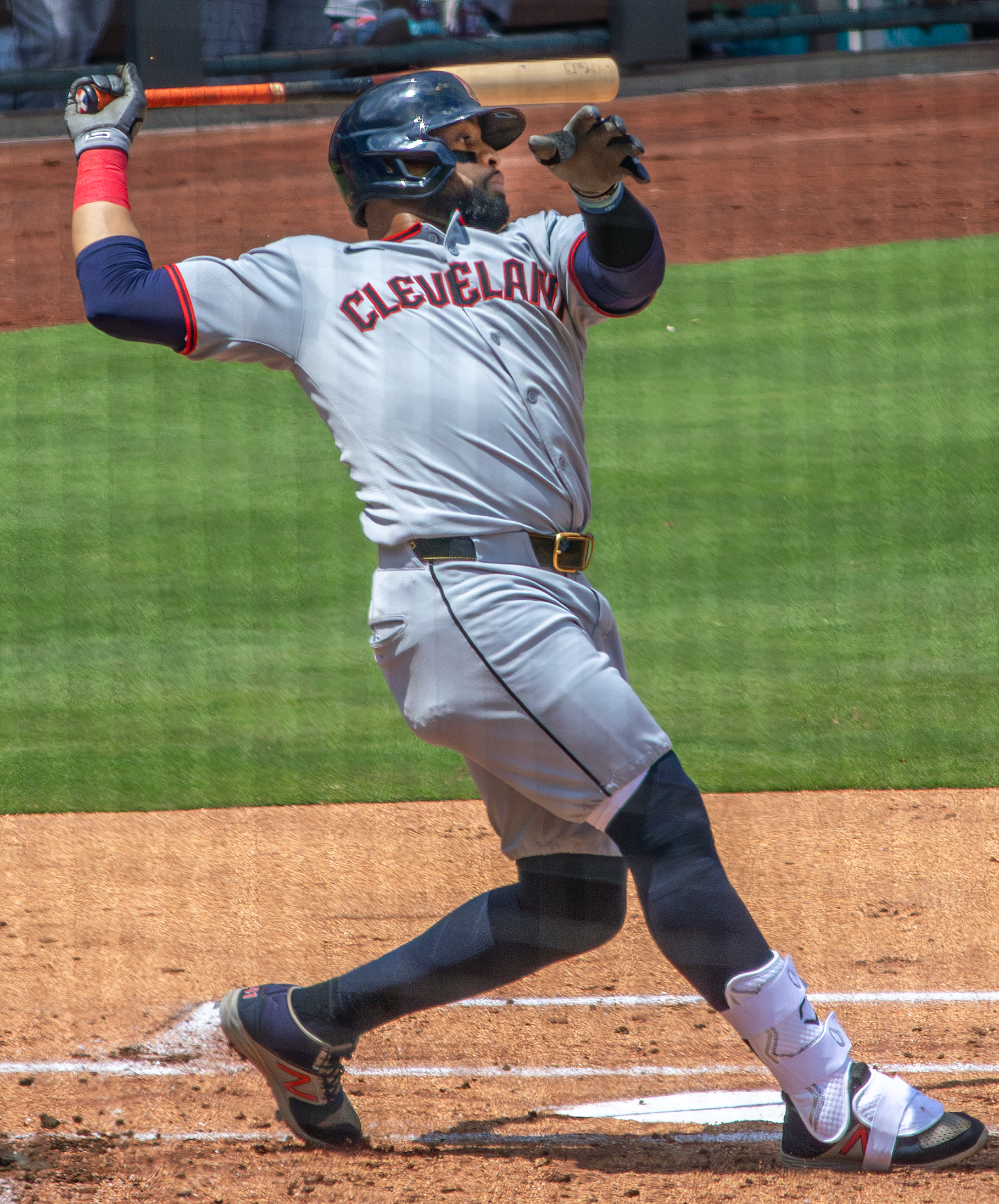
Carlos Santana with Cleveland in 2025.

On February 7, 2024, Santana signed a one-year, $5.25 million contract with the Minnesota Twins. He played in his 2,000th career game on June 21, 2024, batting 1-for-4 with a double at the Oakland Coliseum. In 150 games, he batted .238/.328/.420 with 23 home runs and 71 RBI. Defensively, he led AL first basemen in games (146), assists (92), and total zone runs (10), and ranked third in putouts (998). Santana won the AL Gold Glove for first base at the end of the 2024 season; at 38 years and 174 days, he was the oldest position player in MLB history to win his first Gold Glove award.

=== Third stint with Cleveland ===
On December 23, 2024, Santana signed a one-year, $12 million contract with the Cleveland Guardians. During May, he collected 22 RBI—tying his career-best for any month—and also slashed .307/.448/.507/.955. By authoring a 10-game hitting streak, Santana became the first player aged 39 or older since Eddie Murray in 1996 to accomplish the feat for Cleveland. In 116 appearances for Cleveland, he batted .225/.316/.333 with 11 home runs, 52 RBI, and seven stolen bases. On August 28, Santana was released by the Guardians.

=== Chicago Cubs ===
On August 31, 2025, Santana signed a one-year major league contract with the Chicago Cubs. He appeared in eight games for the Cubs, going 2-for-19 (.105) with two RBI.

=== Arizona Diamondbacks ===
On February 10, 2026, Santana signed a one-year, $2 million contract with the Arizona Diamondbacks. On April 7, Santana was placed on the injured list due to a strained right adductor. He was transferred to the 60-day injured list on June 1. In eight appearances for Arizona, he slashed .083/.154/.125 with no home runs or RBI. On June 24, Santana was designated for assignment by the Diamondbacks upon being activated from the injured list. He was released by the organization two days later.

=== Atlanta Braves ===
On June 28, 2026, Santana signed a minor league contract with the Atlanta Braves. He made 27 appearances for the Triple–A Gwinnett Stripers, batting .292/.385/.383 with two home runs, 18 RBI, and two stolen bases. Santana was released by the Braves organization on August 16.

== International career ==
Santana represented the Dominican Republic national team at the World Baseball Classic in 2013 and 2017. They won the gold medal for the 2013 championship, defeating Puerto Rico 3–0 in the final. In the MLB Japan All-Star Series, he played for the United States in the 2014 and 2018 editions.

== Player profile ==
Santana is known by the nicknames "Slamtana," "Axeman", and "El Oso" ("The Bear" in Spanish). In 2019, Santana raised his batting average to above his career high by hitting the ball the other way more frequently.

Until spring training of the 2019 season, Santana did not have an established routine, he stated. It was during that period that Indians assistant hitting coach Vic Rodriguez urged him to do so, because "if you have a consistent routine that works for you and you stick to it every day regardless of how good or bad a season you’re having, you’re going to be fine." The approach was designed to hit the ball with more hard contact up the middle, rather than attempt to continuously pull it, helping to significantly improve in virtually every category. He maintained better focus and increased his ability to shorten slumps. Commented longtime teammates Francisco Lindor, "[h]e’s always been a good player, but his mental preparation is a lot better this year. ... [H]e would have just two at-bats [a game]. He would have two good at-bats and the rest, whatever. Now he has three to five good at-bats."

Third baseman José Ramírez noticed a more relaxed approach. "When he was first with us, his attitude was different, especially when things weren’t going well for him, it was very different. He’s changed. He doesn’t worry as much. He works, he knows what he has to do. I think it’s maturity and time, too. Maybe he learned from the rough year he had in Philadelphia."

Santana wears the number 41 in honor of Víctor Martínez, who is also a switch-hitting former catcher who started his career with the Cleveland Indians.

== Awards ==
- 2× AL Player of the Week (Jul. 27, 2014; Sep. 25, 2016)
- All-Star Futures Game (2009)
- 2× Baseball America Minor League All-Star Team (2008–2nd Team, 2009–1st Team)
- California League Most Valuable Player (2008)
- Cleveland Indians Player of the Year (2011)
- Cleveland Indians Minor League Player of the Year (2009)
- Eastern League Most Valuable Player (2009)
- Hi-A Player of the Year (2008)
- 4× Minor League Baseball All-Star (2008 Hi-A, 2008 California League, 2009 Double-A, 2009 Eastern League)
- MLB All-Star (2019)
- 2× MLB Japan Series All-Star (2014, 2018)
- Wilson All-Defensive Team—1B (2017)
- World Baseball Classic champion (2013)

== Personal life ==
Santana is married and his family resides in Cleveland. They maintained the same residence in Cleveland while he played for Philadelphia in the 2018 season. He mentioned that he considered the local police and a young boy with cerebral palsy named Niko Lanzarotta–whom he also named as his best friend in Cleveland–as part of his family.

On April 19, 2019, Santana became a naturalized United States citizen.

== See also ==
- Cleveland Guardians award winners and league leaders
- List of Dominican Americans
- List of Major League Baseball career bases on balls leaders
- List of Major League Baseball career home run leaders
- List of Major League Baseball career assists as a first baseman leaders
- List of Major League Baseball players from the Dominican Republic
