= Voros McCracken =

American baseball sabermetrician (born 1971)

- Born: Robert McCracken; August 17, 1971 (age 54); Chicago, Illinois, U.S.
- Occupations: Sports statistician, sabermetrician
- Known for: Defense independent pitching statistics
- Website: Official website

Robert "Voros" McCracken (born August 17, 1971, Chicago) is an American baseball sabermetrician. "Voros" is a nickname from his partial Hungarian heritage and translates to "red" in English. He is widely recognized for his pioneering work on Defense Independent Pitching Statistics (DIPS).

== DIPS ==
McCracken first published his ideas about DIPS in 1999 on the rec.sports.baseball newsgroup on Usenet. He also effectively named the new concept of "defense independent pitching" with that publication: "I've been working on a pitching evaluation tool and thought I'd post it here to get some feedback. I call it 'Defensive Independent Pitching' and what it does is evaluate a pitcher base[d] strictly on the statistics his defense has no ability to affect...".

His findings implied that major league pitchers had little control over the outcome of balls put into play against them and specifically that the percentage of balls put into play against a particular pitcher that fell for hits did not correlate across seasons. This implied that elements beyond the pitcher's control, including defense, ballpark, weather and randomness, had significant effects upon his performance.

McCracken's "Pitchers and Defense: How Much Control Do Hurlers Have?" was published on the Baseball Prospectus website in 2001 and was picked up on by baseball researchers and ESPN baseball writer and analyst Rob Neyer. After explaining McCracken's findings, including reporting some of his own calculations from the previous years' pitching statistics and describing the aspects of DIPS that were most original, Neyer concluded: "And it seems to me that anyone who wants to project pitcher performance should read McCracken's article, because it'll blow your mind." In his book The Numbers Game, Alan Schwarz writes that McCracken told him “all hell broke loose” after Neyer's column appeared. He received nearly 2,000 emails in the next couple of days and thousands more in the ensuing months.

Sabermetrician Craig Wright agreed that hit rate is not as heavily influenced by the pitcher as is commonly believed, but at the same time concluded "... some [pitchers] emphasize pitches that are tough to hit sharply enough to get your share of hits on balls in play. I don't think the latter is a primary way for pitchers to distinguish themselves from others, but I do believe it is a more significant factor for some groups than others." He specifically cited two groups, knuckleball pitchers and flyball pitchers, as examples of those who tend to allow fewer hits on balls in the field of play.

Subsequent independent research by Phil Birnbaum, Clifford Blau and Tom Tippett confirmed Wright's findings, but Wright still praises McCracken as "... 'the' guy who really got people to understand that most folks overestimate the pitcher's ability to influence the number of hits that result from balls batted into the field of play."

Bill James also expressed some skepticism but recognized the potential value of McCracken's findings if further research bore them out. He argued that "the research really should be done, for several reasons. First, if McCracken turns out to be correct, this has important consequences, even allowing us, to a certain extent, to predict movements in pitcher's records. . . ." In his New Historical Baseball Abstract in 2001, James acknowledged that McCracken was correct, that the results were significant, and that James himself felt "stupid for not having realized it 30 years ago." Rob Neyer noted the impact of McCracken's discovery on James' subsequent work. The discovery and its influence on baseball analysis is outlined in Moneyball: The Art of Winning an Unfair Game.

McCracken continued to refine his new statistic, including addressing the issue of knuckleballers in his DIPS 2.0 in 2002. He published DIPS statistical results as well as extensions and improvements to his initial formulas in other forums, including Baseball Primer (now Baseball Think Factory).

Baseball researchers have continued to evaluate and to propose refinements to DIPS, such as Tom Tippett in his 2003 article "Can Pitchers Prevent Hits on Balls in Play?".

== Subsequent career ==
=== Red Sox ===
A year and a half after the publication of his "Pitchers and Defense" article, McCracken's discovery earned him a consulting position with the Boston Red Sox. An important consequence of this was that by early 2003, he ceased publishing revisions of his formulas or updated results. He announced this step with excitement on his website on February 18, 2003. McCracken worked for the Red Sox through June 2005.

=== After the Boston hiatus ===
McCracken continued to think about how to measure performance in a variety of organized sports, such as international football (American soccer).

In 2007, he began a blog, vorosmccracken.com, with the subtitle “triumphant return of The Knack of the baseball world." The blog focused much of its attention on international soccer, including ratings of the national teams and forecasts of team performance in the World Cup 2010 and other tournaments. But he has little involvement in baseball analysis.

Jeff Passan has written,

Of course, one great idea guarantees nothing.

Not prominence. McCracken spends his days and nights analyzing European soccer. He won't say for what or whom or where. The client appreciates anonymity.

Wealth is absent, too. McCracken lives paycheck to paycheck. He couldn't make rent on his apartment last year.

"If I give DIPS away for free once, that's fine," he says. "I came up with an idea that was monetized to the hundreds of millions of dollars, and I'm broke. I'm glad I did it. Can't do it anymore. I've done enough to prove I can at least do something. Boy, that's a revolutionary idea that changed baseball. Can you do it again? No. I can't do it again unless you pay me”.

And there's the deepest, most hurtful part of all: Voros McCracken hasn't worked in baseball since the game chewed him up and spit him out five years ago. In an industry where progress moves by the inch, the man who sent it forward a mile can't get a job. And he's not quite sure why.

As of March 2017, McCracken worked for the Chicago White Sox.

== Legacy ==
While still doing sports analysis, including occasional publications on such media as ESPN.com, his major legacy is the revolution that he helped to bring to the statistical analysis of major league baseball. In a 2011 article titled "Voros McCracken changed the world," baseball writer Jeff Passan wrote:

A decade after Baseball Prospectus let McCracken spread the gospel in a story that popularized DIPS across the sport, it remains among the most seminal theories developed by sabermetrics, the nickname given to quantitative baseball study. It's almost certainly the most revolutionary. Nothing before or since has so upended an entire line of thought and forced teams to assess a wide breadth of players in a different fashion.

== See also ==
- Defense-Independent ERA
- Defense Independent Pitching Statistics
- Sabermetrics
