= List of Major League Baseball career bases on balls leaders =

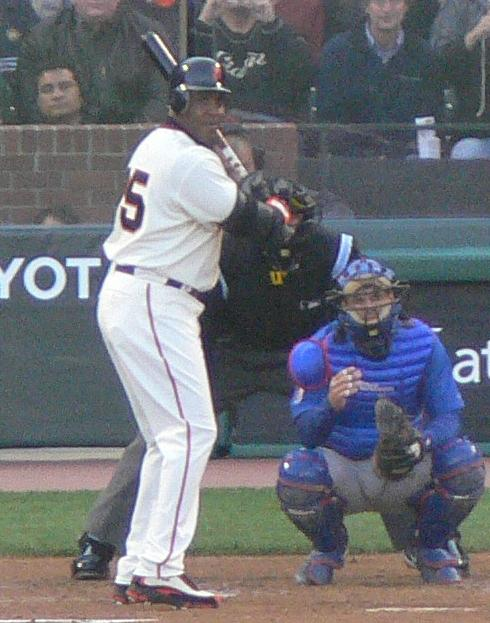
Barry Bonds holds the record for being walked the most times in MLB history.

A base on balls (BB), also known as a walk, occurs in baseball when a batter receives four pitches that the umpire calls balls, and is in turn awarded first base without the possibility of being called out. The base on balls is defined in Section 2.00 of baseball's Official Rules, and further detail is given in 6.08(a).

The following table lists the top 100 career base on balls leaders in Major League Baseball history. Since 2007, Barry Bonds holds the record for most career walks drawn with 2,558. Rickey Henderson (2,190), Babe Ruth (2,062), and Ted Williams (2,021) are the only other players to draw more than 2,000 walks in their careers. The active leader in walks, and 40th all time, is Carlos Santana with 1,332.

== Key ==
**Rank**	Rank among players in career walks. A blank field indicates a tie.
**Player (2027 BB)**	Name (walks in 2027)
**BB**	Career walks
*	Elected to Hall of Fame
**Bold**	Active player (Note: A player is considered inactive if he has announced his retirement or has not played for a full season.)

== List ==
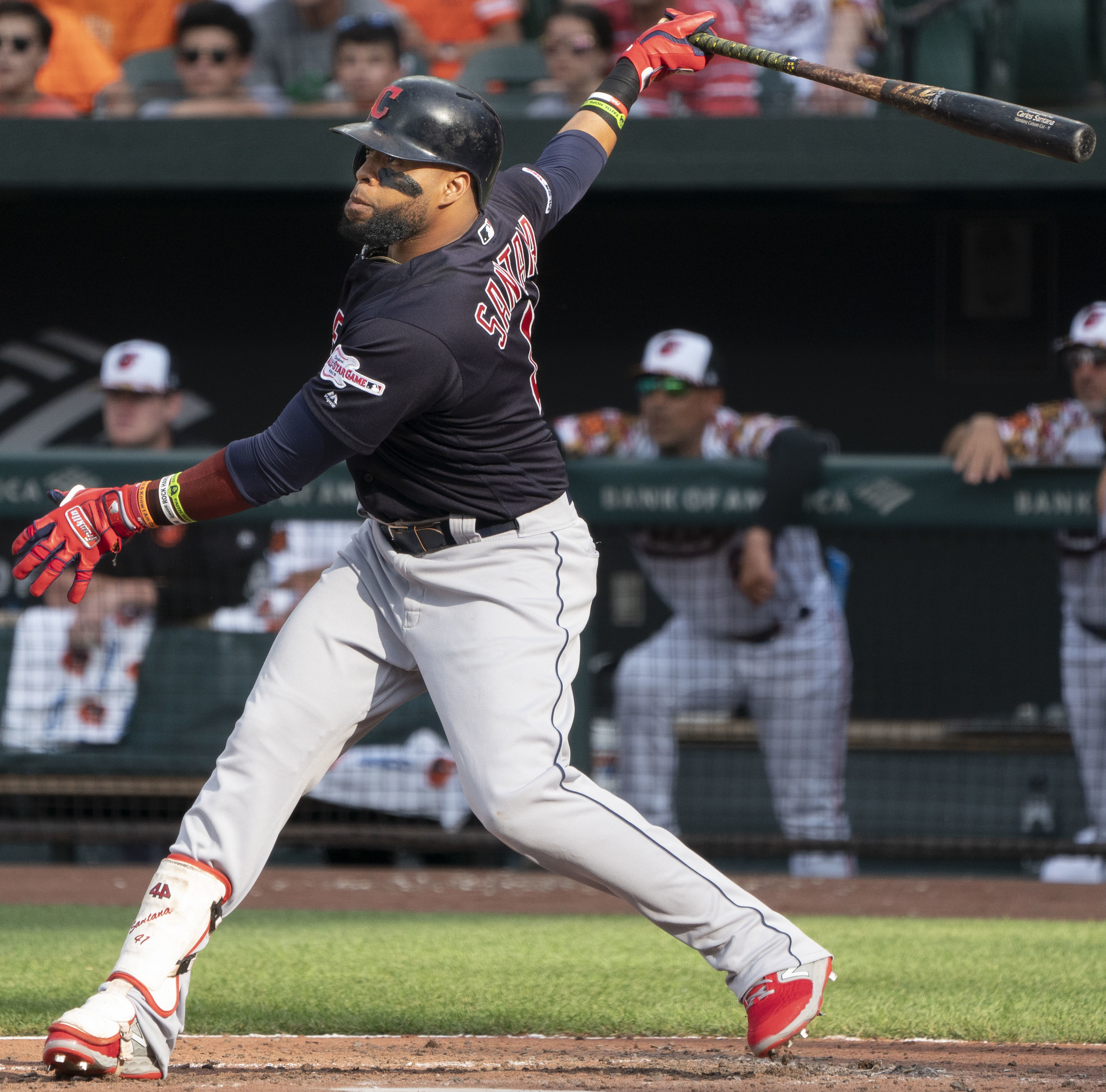
Carlos Santana, the active leader and 40th all-time in career bases on balls.

- Stats updated as of 2026 season.

Rank	Player (2027 BB)	BB
1	Barry Bonds	2,558
2	Rickey Henderson*	2,190
3	Babe Ruth*	2,062
4	Ted Williams*	2,021
5	Joe Morgan*	1,865
6	Carl Yastrzemski*	1,845
7	Jim Thome*	1,747
8	Mickey Mantle*	1,733
9	Mel Ott*	1,708
10	Frank Thomas*	1,667
11	Eddie Yost	1,614
12	Darrell Evans	1,605
13	Stan Musial*	1,599
14	Pete Rose	1,566
15	Harmon Killebrew*	1,559
16	Chipper Jones*	1,512
17	Lou Gehrig*	1,508
18	Mike Schmidt*	1,507
19	Eddie Collins*	1,499
20	Bobby Abreu	1,476
21	Gary Sheffield	1,475
22	Willie Mays*	1,464
23	Jimmie Foxx*	1,452
24	Eddie Mathews*	1,444
25	Frank Robinson*	1,420
26	Wade Boggs*	1,412
27	Hank Aaron*	1,402
28	Jeff Bagwell*	1,401
29	Dwight Evans	1,391
30	Tris Speaker*	1,381
31	Reggie Jackson*	1,375
32	Albert Pujols	1,373
33	Jason Giambi	1,366
34	Joey Votto	1,365
35	Rafael Palmeiro	1,353
36	Willie McCovey*	1,345
37	Alex Rodriguez	1,338
38	Todd Helton*	1,335
39	Eddie Murray*	1,333
40	**Carlos Santana (0)**	1,332
41	Tim Raines*	1,330
42	Manny Ramirez	1,329
43	David Ortiz*	1,319
	Tony Phillips	1,319
45	Adam Dunn	1,317
	Mark McGwire	1,317
47	Ken Griffey Jr.*	1,312
48	Fred McGriff*	1,305
49	Luke Appling*	1,302
50	Edgar Martínez*	1,283

Rank	Player (2027 BB)	BB
51	Al Kaline*	1,277
52	John Olerud	1,275
53	Ken Singleton	1,263
54	Jack Clark	1,262
55	Miguel Cabrera	1,258
56	Rusty Staub	1,255
57	Ty Cobb*	1,249
58	Willie Randolph	1,243
59	Jimmy Wynn	1,224
60	Dave Winfield*	1,216
61	**Bryce Harper (0)**	1,212
62	Pee Wee Reese*	1,210
63	Lance Berkman	1,201
64	Richie Ashburn*	1,198
65	Brian Downing	1,197
	Lou Whitaker	1,197
67	Chili Davis	1,194
68	**Andrew McCutchen (0)**	1,192
69	Billy Hamilton*	1,189
70	Charlie Gehringer*	1,186
71	Brian Giles	1,183
72	**Mike Trout (0)**	1,174
73	Craig Biggio*	1,160
74	Donie Bush	1,158
75	Max Bishop	1,156
76	Luis Gonzalez	1,155
77	Toby Harrah	1,153
78	**Freddie Freeman (0)**	1,136
	Harry Hooper*	1,136
80	Jimmy Sheckard	1,135
81	Brett Butler	1,129
	Cal Ripken Jr.*	1,129
83	**Paul Goldschmidt (0)**	1,115
84	Carlos Delgado	1,109
85	Ron Santo*	1,108
86	Jim Gilliam	1,102
87	George Brett*	1,096
88	Paul Molitor*	1,094
89	Lu Blue	1,092
	Stan Hack	1,092
91	Paul Waner*	1,091
92	Graig Nettles	1,088
93	Bobby Grich	1,087
94	Carlos Beltrán*	1,084
95	Derek Jeter*	1,082
96	Mark Grace	1,075
	Bob Johnson	1,075
	Robin Ventura	1,075
99	Ozzie Smith*	1,072
100	Harlond Clift	1,070
	Keith Hernandez	1,070
