= Vladimir Guerrero Jr. =

Canadian baseball player (born 1999)

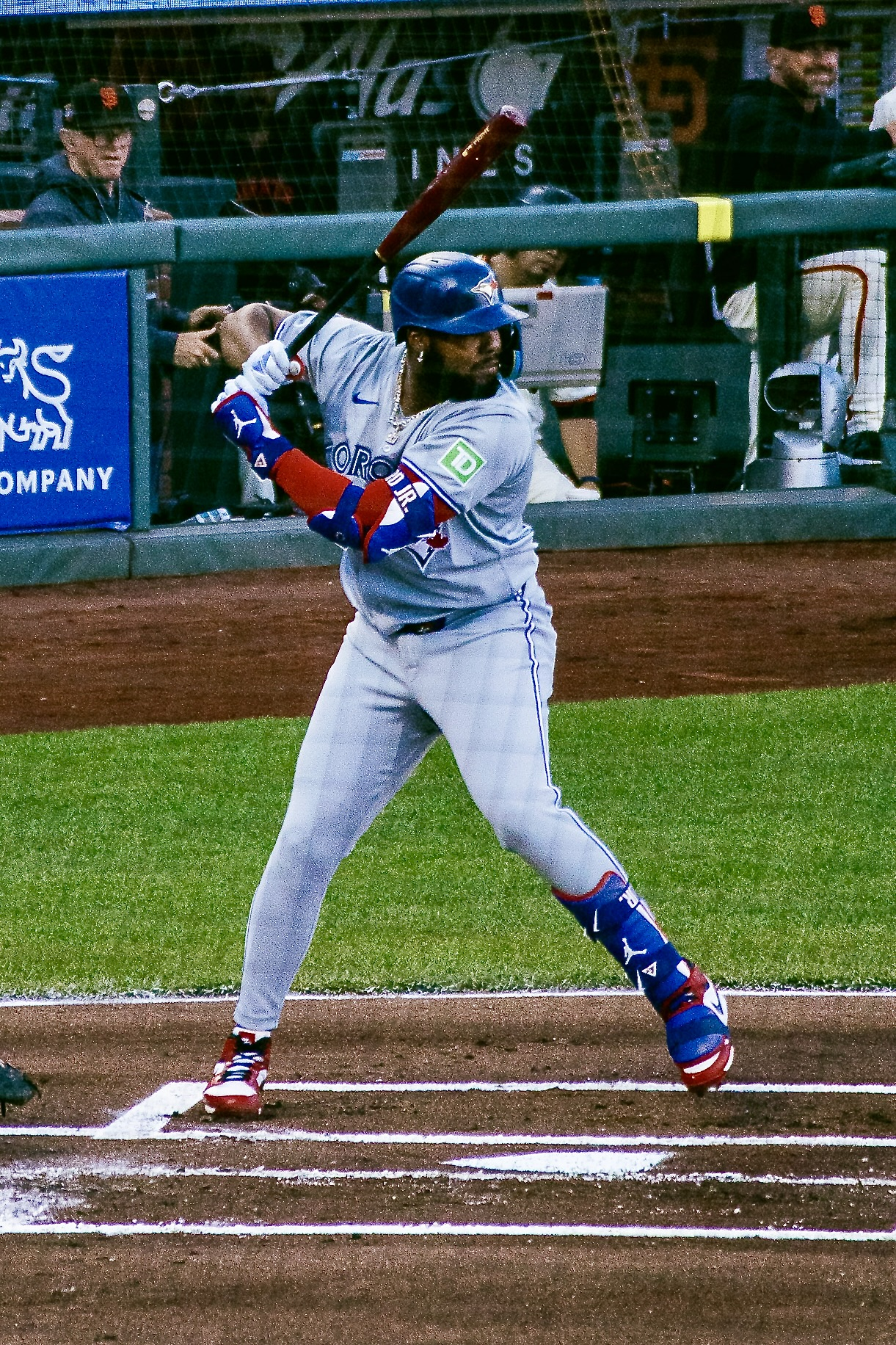
- Guerrero with the Blue Jays in 2024

Toronto Blue Jays – No. 27
- First baseman
- Born: March 16, 1999 (age 27); Montreal, Quebec, Canada
- Bats: Right Throws: Right

MLB debut
- April 26, 2019, for the Toronto Blue Jays

MLB statistics (through 2026 season)
- Batting average: .285
- Home runs: 192
- Runs batted in: 648
- Stats at Baseball Reference

Teams
- Toronto Blue Jays (2019–present)

Career highlights and awards
- 6× All-Star (2021–2026); 3× All-MLB First Team (2021, 2024, 2025); ALCS MVP (2025); Gold Glove Award (2022); 2× Silver Slugger Award (2021, 2024); AL Hank Aaron Award (2021); MLB home run leader (2021) (Note: Tied with Salvador Perez)
Medals
Men's baseball
Representing Dominican Republic
World Baseball Classic
Bronze medal – third place	2026 Miami	Team

Vladimir Guerrero Ramos (Note: While he is generally referred to as Vladimir Guerrero Jr., Guerrero and his father have different maternal family names: Ramos and Alvino, respectively.) (born March 16, 1999), also known as Vladdy, is a Dominican-Canadian professional baseball first baseman for the Toronto Blue Jays of Major League Baseball (MLB). He made his MLB debut in 2019 and bats and throws right-handed. Guerrero is the son of Baseball Hall of Famer Vladimir Guerrero Sr. He represents the Dominican Republic internationally.

Born in Montreal, Quebec, Guerrero was signed by the Toronto Blue Jays as an international free agent in 2015. In 2018, he was named Minor League Player of the Year by both Baseball America and USA Today after batting.381 with 20 home runs, 78 runs batted in (RBI), and 38 strikeouts in 95 games. In 2021, he led MLB in home runs (48, tied), runs scored (123), and total bases (363), while earning his first All-Star Game selection and winning the All-Star Game Most Valuable Player (MVP) award, becoming the youngest player to do so. He also finished second in American League (AL) MVP voting that season. Since 2021, Guerrero has appeared in six All-Star Games, been selected three times to the All-MLB First Team, and won two Silver Slugger Awards and one Gold Glove Award as a first baseman.

== Early life ==
Guerrero is the son of Vladimir Guerrero Sr. and the nephew of former MLB player Wilton Guerrero. He was born in Montreal, during his father's tenure with the Montreal Expos, which granted him Canadian citizenship. After his parents separated when he was very young, he moved with his mother, Riquelma Ramos, to Santiago in the Dominican Republic. Throughout his childhood, Guerrero split his time living with his mother in Santiago, with his uncle Wilton in Don Gregorio, and spent summers with his father in the United States.

In 2003, during his final game for the Expos at Olympic Stadium, Guerrero's father received a standing ovation. Four-year-old Guerrero, dressed in an Expos uniform, joined his father on the field. His father instructed him to remove his helmet and wave to the crowd, creating a moment that has been widely recognized as an iconic photograph.

Guerrero was introduced to baseball by his uncle Wilton, who played a crucial role in his development in the sport. Guerrero has credited Wilton for teaching him the fundamentals of baseball and guiding his practice from a young age, stating, "I think everything I've learned in baseball has been from him. I've been practicing with him since I was five. He's the one who taught me to practice well and guided me to where I am."

== Professional career ==
=== Minor leagues ===
In 2015, Baseball America ranked Guerrero as the top international free agent, and MLB.com ranked him the fourth-best. He signed with the Toronto Blue Jays on July 2, 2015, for $3.9 million at age 16. He was assigned to extended spring training camp to open the 2016 minor league season. He made his professional baseball debut with the Rookie Advanced Bluefield Blue Jays on June 23. Guerrero hit his first professional home run on June 24, a two-run shot in a 4–2 loss to the Bristol Pirates. On August 12, he recorded his first multi-home run game, hitting two solo shots in an 18–5 win against the Pulaski Yankees. Later in August, he was named the Appalachian League's postseason All-Star at third base. Guerrero played in 62 games in 2016, and hit.271 with eight home runs, 46 runs batted in (RBI), and 15 stolen bases. On January 24, 2017, MLB named Guerrero the third best prospect at third base.

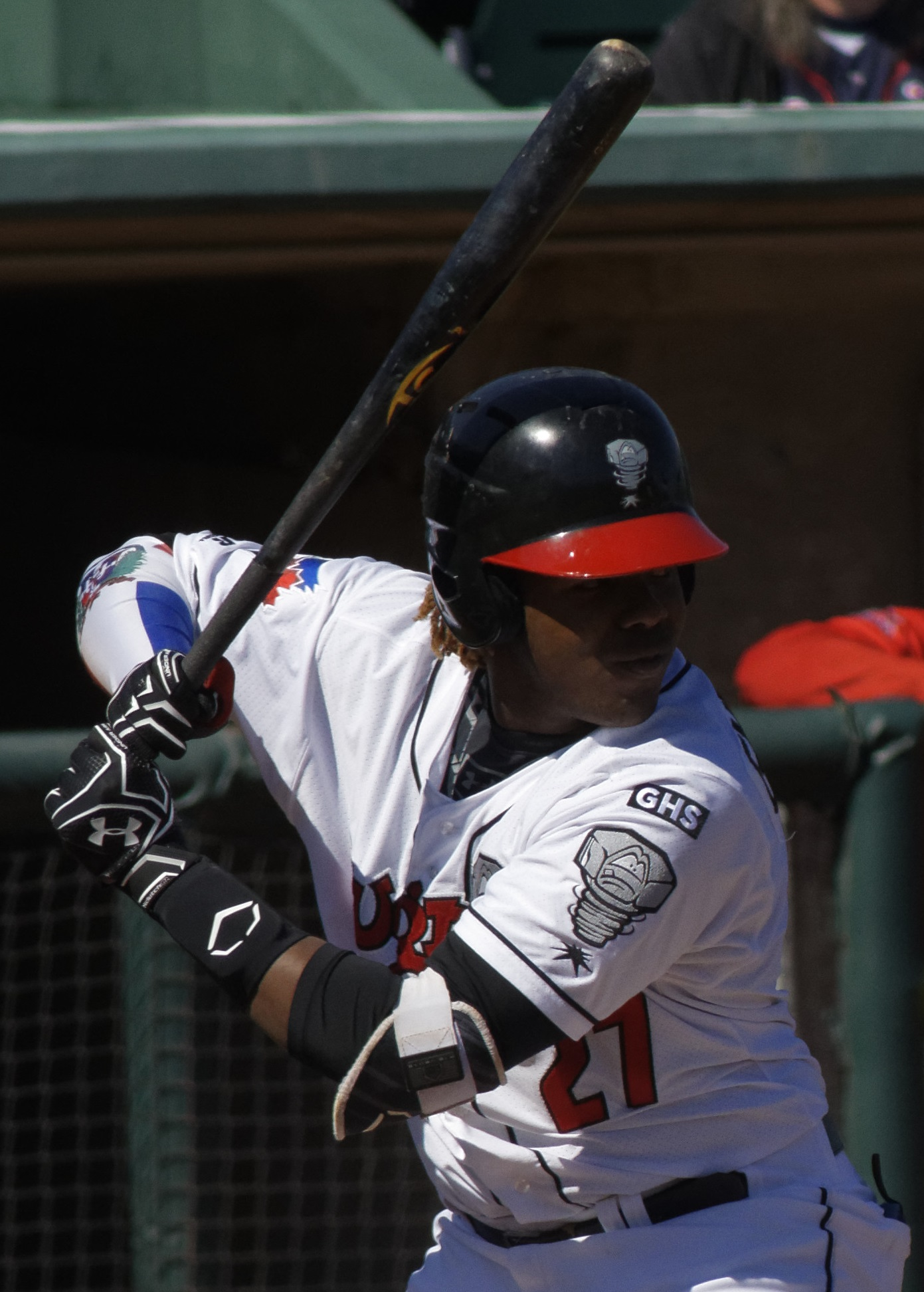
Guerrero with the Lansing Lugnuts in 2017

Guerrero opened the 2017 minor league season with the Class-A Lansing Lugnuts. On April 7, against the Great Lakes Loons, he hit his first home run of the season. He was named a Midwest League All-Star on June 7, and on June 29, he was named to the World team roster for the 2017 All-Star Futures Game. On July 6, the Blue Jays announced Guerrero would be promoted to the Advanced-A Dunedin Blue Jays following the Futures Game. Against the Clearwater Threshers on August 31, Guerrero hit a home run to give the Blue Jays a 5–3 win, clinching Dunedin's Florida State League playoff spot. Guerrero finished the 2017 season with a.323 batting average, 13 home runs, and 76 RBIs in 119 games. He also walked more than he struck out, with 76 and 62, respectively, and posted a.910 on-base plus slugging percentage (OPS). On September 6, Guerrero was named ESPN's Prospect of the Year. During the offseason, he played in 26 games for the Leones del Escogido of the Dominican Winter League.

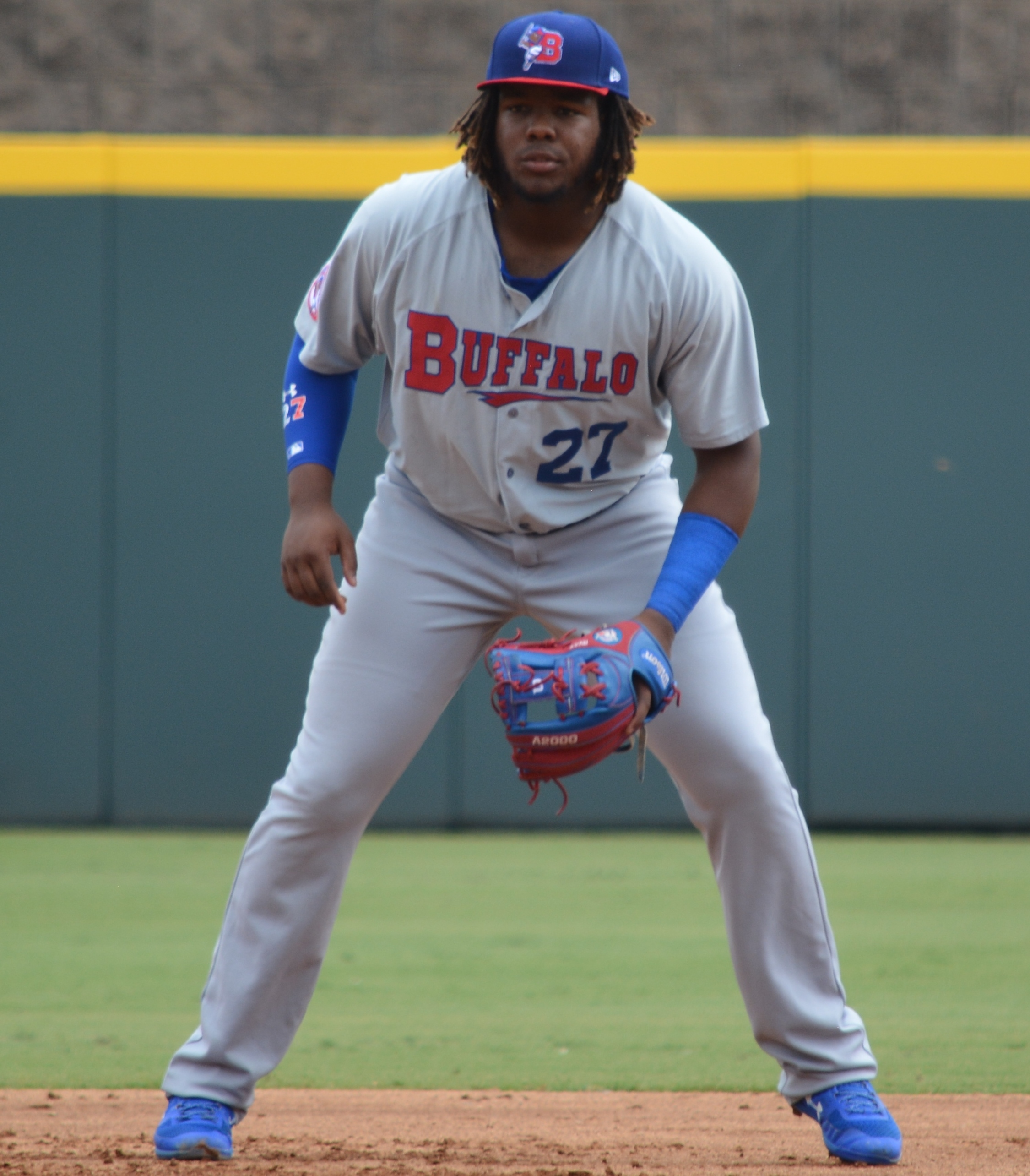
Guerrero with the Buffalo Bisons in 2018

Entering 2018, Guerrero was considered the top prospect in the Blue Jays organization by MLB.com and Baseball America. On March 23, Blue Jays president Mark Shapiro announced that Guerrero would begin the season with the Double-A New Hampshire Fisher Cats. Through the first month of the season, he led the Eastern League with a.398 batting average and 30 RBIs. On June 4, he was named the Eastern League's Player of the Month after hitting.438 with nine home runs and 28 RBIs in May. On June 6, Guerrero was removed from a game against the Akron RubberDucks with a leg injury. Three days later, it was determined that he had sustained a patellar tendon strain in his left knee and would be placed on the disabled list for at least four weeks. On July 28, it was announced that Guerrero would be promoted to the Triple-A Buffalo Bisons following his father's induction into the National Baseball Hall of Fame. Guerrero hit.402 with 14 home runs and 60 RBIs in 61 games with New Hampshire. On August 30, the Blue Jays added Guerrero to the roster of the Surprise Saguaros of the Arizona Fall League (AFL).

Entering 2019 spring training, questions arose as to whether the Blue Jays organization would have Guerrero on the Opening Day roster or seek to manipulate his MLB service time by assigning him to the minors to begin the season. Keeping Guerrero in the minor leagues for the first two weeks of the season would prevent him from reaching free agency until after the 2025 season. On March 10, the Blue Jays announced that Guerrero had suffered an oblique strain two days earlier and was ruled out for the rest of spring training.

=== Toronto Blue Jays ===
==== 2019: MLB Debut ====
On April 24, 2019, the Toronto Blue Jays announced that Guerrero would be called up from Triple-A Buffalo Bisons on April 26. Guerrero was considered the top prospect in all of professional baseball prior to being called up and was hitting .367/.424/.700 with three home runs and eight RBIs during an eight-game stint with the Bisons. He went hitless in his first three at-bats against the Oakland Athletics before hitting a double in the bottom of the ninth inning and exiting for a pinch runner. Guerrero recorded his first multi-hit game and reached base safely four times on May 11.

On May 14, against the San Francisco Giants in Oracle Park, Guerrero hit his first MLB home run in the first inning off Nick Vincent. At 20 years and 59 days of age, Guerrero became the youngest Blue Jay to hit a home run, breaking Danny Ainge's record by 18 days. In the sixth inning, with two men on, he hit another home run off Reyes Moronta. He hit two more home runs in the following series against the Chicago White Sox, including one that bounced off the glove of center fielder Leury Garcia and over the wall. Guerrero's four home runs over a six-game road trip earned him the American League Player of the Week Award, making him the youngest Blue Jay to win the award. On May 22, he hit his first home run at the Rogers Centre off Rick Porcello of the Boston Red Sox. On May 31, Guerrero hit his sixth home run against the Colorado Rockies, marking the 1,135th home run hit in May across MLB and setting a new MLB record for the most home runs hit in a single calendar month, surpassing the previous record of 1,119 set in August 2017. On July 8, he broke the single round home run record in the Home Run Derby with a total of 40 home runs after three overtimes in the semifinals against Joc Pederson. He also broke the record for most home runs in a derby with 91, although he lost in the final round to Pete Alonso. In 2019, Guerrero batted .272/.339/.433 with 15 home runs and 69 RBIs in 514 plate appearances. He hit a ball with the fastest exit velocity of any ball hit by MLB batters in 2019, recorded at 118.9 mph.

==== 2020 ====
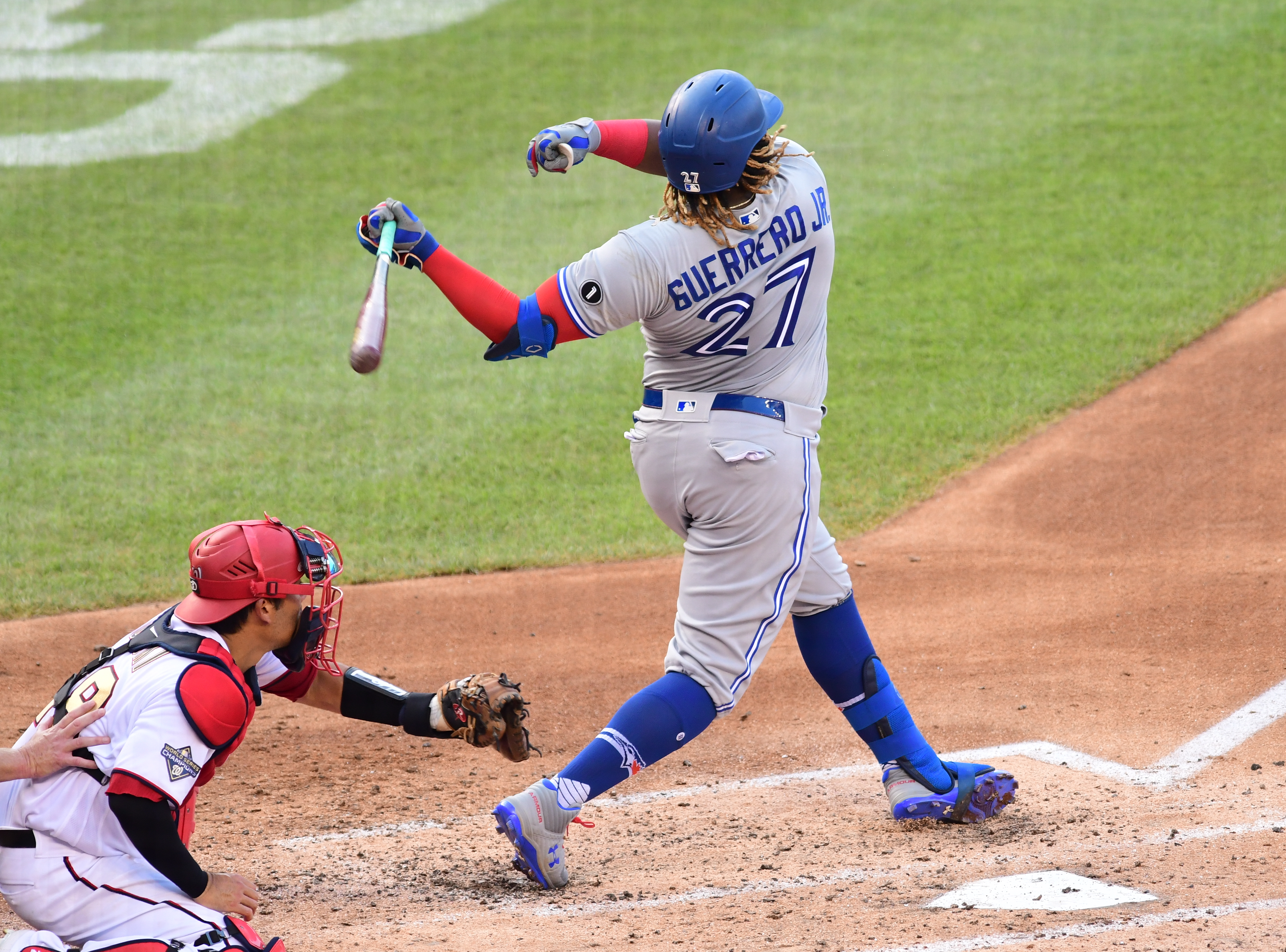
Guerrero batting in 2020

The start of the 2020 MLB season was delayed until late July by the COVID-19 pandemic. On July 10, Blue Jays manager Charlie Montoyo announced that Guerrero would shift primarily to playing first base, but would still play at third base and designated hitter when necessary. Guerrero played in all 60 games of the shortened 2020 season and batted .262 with nine home runs and 33 RBIs.

In his postseason debut, Guerrero batted 1-for-7 with one hit-by-pitch (HBP) as the Blue Jays lost both games of the AL Wild Card Series to the Tampa Bay Rays.

==== 2021: First All-Star Appearance and Hank Aaron Award ====
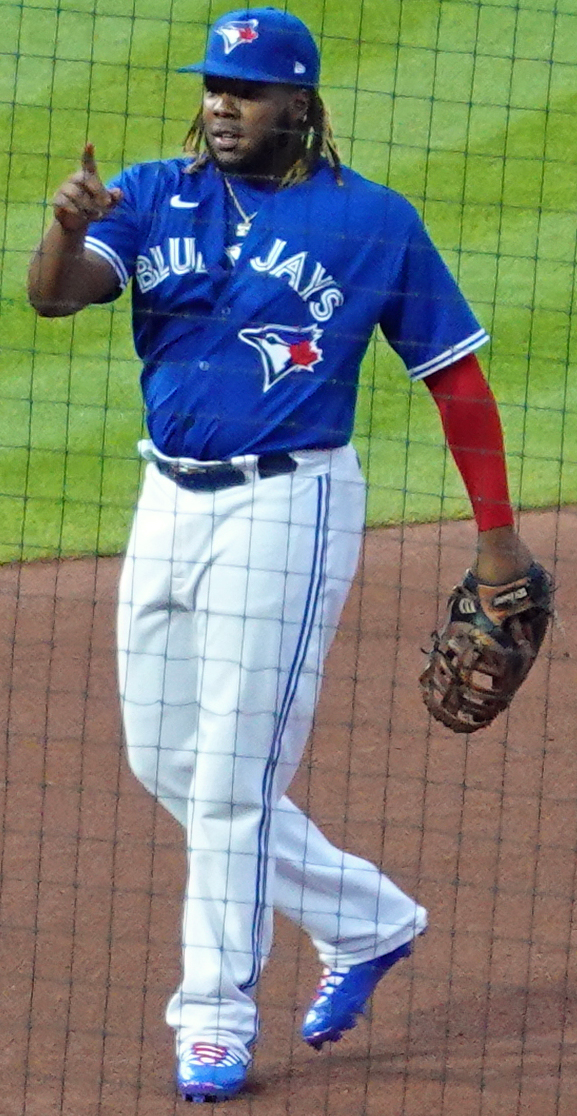
Guerrero fielding in 2021

Guerrero began the 2021 season at a substantially lower weight than he did in each of the previous two seasons. After beginning a weight loss regimen in July 2020, Guerrero went on to lose 42 pounds. The reduced weight made him feel "quicker, stronger and more resilient." He opened the 2021 season as the Blue Jays' primary first baseman while also getting routine starts at the designated hitter position.

On April 27, 2021, Guerrero had his first career three-homer game, including a grand slam against Washington Nationals starter Max Scherzer, to go along with 7 RBIs on the day. On June 21, Guerrero rejected an invitation to participate in the Home Run Derby, despite his record-setting performance in the 2019 derby. He stated that he was looking forward to playing in the All-Star Game but would like to use the time to otherwise regroup and "refresh mentally" for the second half of the season. On June 26, Guerrero hit his 50th career home run in his 258th career game, reaching the milestone in the same number of games as his father.

MLB announced on June 27 that Guerrero was a voting finalist for the starting first base position at the 2021 All-Star Game in Denver, having led all MLB players in Phase 1 of voting with 2,704,788 votes. On June 28, Guerrero was named the American League Player of the Week, after hitting home runs in three consecutive games, driving in seven runs, and batting .391/.481/.826. It was Guerrero's first Player of the Week honor since August 2019. On July 1, Guerrero was named the starting first baseman for the American League in the All-Star Game. In the game, he hit the 200th home run in All-Star Game history, became part of the third father-son duo to hit home runs in All-Star Games, and was named as the game's Most Valuable Player (MVP). He was the first Blue Jays player to win, the first Canadian citizen to win, and the youngest All-Star Game MVP at age 22 and 119 days, beating Ken Griffey Jr., who was 22 years and 236 days old in 1992. On September 6, in a game against the New York Yankees, Guerrero hit his 40th home run of the season, joining his father as the second father-son duo in MLB history to each have a 40-home run season in their careers. Previously, the only father and son to have done so were Cecil Fielder and his son Prince Fielder, both of whom played during the career of the elder Guerrero.

Guerrero finished the 2021 season batting .311/.401/.601 and tied the MLB lead in home runs with Salvador Perez (48), led in runs scored (123), and led the majors in total bases (363). He won the American League Hank Aaron Award and the Tip O'Neill Award for 2021, but finished second in American League MVP voting behind Shohei Ohtani.

==== 2022: First Gold Glove Award ====
On March 22, 2022, Guerrero signed a $7.9 million contract with the Blue Jays, avoiding salary arbitration. During an April 13 game against the New York Yankees, Guerrero hit a home run off Gerrit Cole and subsequently had his hand stepped on by Aaron Hicks during a play at first base. Despite the injury, he remained in the game and hit two more home runs, finishing the day at 4-for-4 with 3 home runs and 4 RBIs. Guerrero then became the first player in MLB history to hit three home runs in a game, then strike out at least four times the following game on April 14.

Later that season, Guerrero was named to start the All-Star Game at first base for the American League.

In a game against the Tampa Bay Rays on September 14, he hit a home run, which was the 100th home run of his career. With this home run, he became the youngest Blue Jay to 100 home runs and the 7th youngest player in MLB history to 100 home runs and 100 doubles.

In 2022, Guerrero led MLB in grounded into double plays (GIDP) with 26, and batted .274/.339/.480 with 32 home runs, 97 RBIs, and 116 strikeouts.

In his return to the postseason, he batted 1-for-9 with one RBI as the Blue Jays lost the AL Wild Card Series to the Seattle Mariners, despite having home-field advantage at the Rogers Centre.

On November 1, 2022, Guerrero won the American League Gold Glove Award at first base in recognition of his exceptional defensive performance.

==== 2023: Home Run Derby Champion ====
On July 10, 2023, Guerrero won the MLB Home Run Derby in Seattle. He hit a final round record 25 home runs to defeat Randy Arozarena. Guerrero became part of the first father-son duo to win the Derby, with his father Vladimir Guerrero Sr. having won the contest in 2007.

Guerrero finished the season batting .264/.345/.444 with 26 home runs and 94 RBIs. Guerrero and the Jays again played poorly in the playoffs, being swept for the third consecutive postseason appearance, losing to the Minnesota Twins in the AL Wild Card Series. He batted 1-for-7 with a double and a walk.

==== 2024 ====
Guerrero's salary for the 2024 season was set at $19.9 million, a record amount determined by the salary arbitration process.

Guerrero finished the season batting .323/.396/.544 with 30 home runs and 103 RBIs.

==== 2025: ALCS MVP ====
On January 9, 2025, Guerrero and the Blue Jays avoided arbitration by agreeing to a $28.5 million salary, the third-highest salary paid to an arbitration-eligible player in league history, behind only Juan Soto in 2024 ($31 million) and Shohei Ohtani in 2023 ($30 million). On April 9, Guerrero signed a 14-year, $500 million extension with the Blue Jays. $325 million of the contract will be paid as signing bonuses each season, and the contract has no deferred money and does not include any opt-outs.

On July 2, Guerrero was named an All-Star for the fifth year in a row. In a game against the Athletics on July 11, Guerrero hit a single, which was the 1,000th hit of his career, becoming the 10th player to reach this feat as a Blue Jay and the youngest to do so.

Guerrero finished the season batting .292/.381/.467 with 23 home runs and 84 RBI.

At the start of the 2025 postseason, Guerrero hit a first-inning home run in Game 1 and later hit his first playoff grand slam in Game 2 of the AL Division Series (ALDS) against the New York Yankees, marking the first playoff grand slam in Blue Jays history. This achievement made Guerrero and his father, Vladimir Guerrero Sr., the only father-son duo in MLB history to both hit grand slams in postseason play. During the AL Championship Series (ALCS) against the Seattle Mariners, Guerrero hit three home runs with a batting average of .385 and an OPS of 1.330 across seven games, earning the ALCS Most Valuable Player Award as the Blue Jays clinched their first American League (AL) championship since 1993. In the World Series, Guerrero batted .333 with two home runs and three RBI, though the Blue Jays ultimately lost to the Los Angeles Dodgers in seven games. His performance throughout the postseason was widely cited as one of the greatest in history.

==== 2026: Offensive struggles ====
On July 4, Guerrero was named an All-Star for the sixth year in a row, but elected not to participate due to lower back discomfort.

Guerrero finished the season batting .260/.332/.356 with 9 home runs (with only 1 at home) and 57 RBI, a notable drop in performance from previous years.

== Player profile ==
Guerrero was seen as a top prospect due to his exceptional hitting ability, which scouts often graded an 80, the highest possible mark on baseball's 20-to-80 scouting scale. His power is often rated at a 70 grade, which indicates a "plus-plus" tool in the scouting industry. Defensively, scouts were unsure if he could remain at third base at the major league level, but he has shown the potential to develop into a passable defender.

== Endorsements ==
On January 30, 2024, Guerrero was announced as the cover athlete for MLB The Show 24. His father, Vladimir Guerrero Sr., also appeared on the cover of MLB 2006, making them the first father-son duo to be featured on the cover of an MLB The Show video game.

== Personal life ==
Guerrero comes from a family with strong connections to baseball. He is the son of Baseball Hall of Famer Vladimir Guerrero Sr., who, as revealed in a 2012 paternity suit, fathered eight children with five different women. As a result, Guerrero has at least seven siblings, two of whom have signed professional contracts with Major League Baseball (MLB) teams. His younger brother Pablo Guerrero signed with the Texas Rangers as an international free agent on January 15, 2023, while his younger half-brother Vladi Miguel Guerrero signed with the New York Mets as an international free agent on January 15, 2024. Guerrero's older cousin, Gabriel Guerrero, has also played in MLB for the Cincinnati Reds. Additionally, Guerrero's godfather is Baseball Hall of Famer Pedro Martinez, a former teammate of his father with the Montreal Expos.

Guerrero communicates in English with his Blue Jays teammates and team staff but continued to give media interviews in Spanish using the team's interpreter until 2025. In 2019, he said, "I'm trying to learn as quickly as possible so I can talk to fans."

Guerrero is a devout Christian. He has said, “Jesus Christ is everything. I read the Bible before every game, when I wake up. I pray and read the Bible before bed.”

== See also ==
- List of largest sports contracts
- List of Major League Baseball annual home run leaders
- List of Major League Baseball annual runs scored leaders
- List of Major League Baseball players from Canada
- List of Major League Baseball players from the Dominican Republic
- List of second-generation Major League Baseball players
- Toronto Blue Jays award winners and league leaders
