= Fielding independent pitching =

Type of baseball statistic

In baseball, fielding independent pitching (FIP) (also referred to as defense independent pitching (DIP)) is intended to measure a pitcher's effectiveness based only on statistics that do not involve fielders (except the catcher). These include home runs allowed, strikeouts, hit batters, walks, and, more recently, variations of FIP include fly ball percentage, ground ball percentage, and (to a much lesser extent) line drive percentage. By focusing on these statistics and ignoring what happens once a ball is put in play, which – on most plays – the pitcher has little control over, FIP claims to offer a clearer picture of the pitcher's true ability.

The most controversial part of FIP is the idea that pitchers have little influence over what happens to balls that are put into play. Some people believe this has been well-established (see below), primarily by showing the large variability of most pitchers' BABIP from year to year. However, there is a wide variation in career BABIP among pitchers, and this seems to correlate with career success. For instance, no pitcher in the Hall of Fame has a below-average career BABIP.

== Formulae ==
Each of the following formulae uses innings pitched (IP), a measure of the number of outs a team made while a pitcher was in the game. Since most outs rely on fielding, the results from calculations using IP are not truly independent of team defense. While the creators of DICE, FIP and similar statistics all suggest they are "defense independent", others have pointed out that their formulas involve (IP). IP is a statistical measure of how many outs were made while a pitcher was pitching. This includes those made by fielders who are typically involved in more than two thirds of the outs. These critics claim this makes pitchers' DICE or FIP highly dependent on the defensive play of their fielders.

=== DICE ===
A simple formula, known as Defense-Independent Component ERA (DICE), was created by Clay Dreslough in 1998:

$$DICE=3.00 + \frac{13HR + 3(BB + HBP) - 2K}{IP}$$

In that equation, "HR" is home runs, "BB" is walks, "HBP" is hit batters, "K" is strikeouts, and "IP" is innings pitched. That equation gives a number that is better at predicting a pitcher's ERA in the following year than the pitcher's actual ERA in the current year.

=== FIP ===
Tom Tango independently derived a similar formula, known as Fielding Independent Pitching, which is very close to the results of dERA and DICE.

$$FIP=\frac{13HR + 3BB - 2K}{IP}$$

In that equation, "HR" is home runs, "BB" is walks, "K" is strikeouts, and "IP" is innings pitched. That equation usually gives a number that is nothing close to a normal ERA (this is the FIP core), so the equation used is more often (but not always) this one:

$$FIP=\frac{13HR + 3BB - 2K}{IP}+C$$

where C is a constant that renders league FIP for the time period in question equal to league ERA for the same period. It is calculated as:

$$C = lgERA - {{13(lgHR) + 3(lgBB) - 2(lgK) \over lgIP }}$$

where lgERA is the league average ERA, lgHR is the number of home runs in the league, lgBB is the number of walks in the league, lgK is the number of strikeouts in the league, and lgIP is the number of innings pitched in the league.

The Hardball Times, a popular baseball statistics website, uses a slightly different FIP equation, instead using 3*(BB+HBP-IBB) rather than simply 3*(BB) where "HBP" stands for batters hit by pitch and "IBB" stands for intentional base on balls.

=== xFIP ===
Dave Studeman of The Hardball Times derived Expected Fielding Independent Pitching (xFIP), a regressed version of FIP. Calculated like FIP, it differs in that it normalizes the number of home runs the pitcher allows, replacing a pitcher's actual home run total with an expected home run total (xHR).

$$xFIP=\frac{13(xHR) + 3BB - 2K}{IP}+ C$$

where xHR is calculated using the league average home run per fly ball rate (lgHR/FB) multiplied by the number of fly balls the pitcher has allowed.

$$xHR = Fly Balls * lgHR/FB$$

Typically, the lgHR/FB is around 10.5%, meaning 10.5% of fly balls go for home runs. In 2015, it was 11.4%.

=== SIERA ===
Baseball Prospectus invented this statistic, which stands for Skill-interactive Earned Run Average. It takes into account and adjusts for balls in play. For example, if a pitcher has a high xFIP, but also induces a lot of ground balls and popups, his SIERA will be lower than his xFIP. The calculations for it are as follows:

$$\begin{aligned}
&\mathrm{SIERA}=6.145
-16.986\left(\frac{SO}{PA}\right)\\
&+11.434\left(\frac{BB}{PA}\right)
-1.858\left(\frac{GB-FB-PU}{PA}\right)\\
&+7.653\left(\frac{SO}{PA}\right)^2
\pm 6.664\left(\frac{GB-FB-PU}{PA}\right)^2\\
&+10.130\left(\frac{SO}{PA}\right)\left(\frac{GB-FB-PU}{PA}\right)
-5.195\left(\frac{BB}{PA}\right)\left(\frac{GB-FB-PU}{PA}\right)
\end{aligned}$$

where SO is strikeouts, PA is plate appearances, BB is bases on balls, GB is ground balls, FB is fly balls, and PU is pop-ups.

== Origins ==
In 1999, Voros McCracken became the first to detail and publicize these effects to the baseball research community when he wrote on rec.sport.baseball, "I've been working on a pitching evaluation tool and thought I'd post it here to get some feedback. I call it 'Defensive Independent Pitching' and what it does is evaluate a pitcher base[d] strictly on the statistics his defense has no ability to affect..." Until the publication of a more widely read article in 2001, however, on Baseball Prospectus, most of the baseball research community believed that individual pitchers had an inherent ability to prevent hits on balls in play. McCracken reasoned that if this ability existed, it would be noticeable in a pitcher's 'Batting Average on Balls In Play' (BABIP). His research found the opposite to be true: that while a pitcher's ability to cause strikeouts or prevent home runs remained somewhat constant from season to season, his ability to prevent hits on balls in play did not.

To better evaluate pitchers in light of his theory, McCracken developed "Defense-Independent ERA" (dERA), the most well-known defense-independent pitching statistic. McCracken's formula for dERA is very complicated, with a number of steps. DIP ERA is not as useful for knuckleballers and other "trick" pitchers, a factor that McCracken mentioned a few days after his original announcement of his research findings in 1999, in a posting on the rec.sport.baseball.analysis Usenet site on November 23, 1999, when he wrote: "Also to [note] is that, anecdotally, I believe pitchers with trick deliveries (e.g. Knuckleballers) might post consistently lower $H numbers than other pitchers. I looked at Tim Wakefield's career and that seems to bear out slightly".

In later postings on the rec.sport.baseball site during 1999 and 2000 (prior to the publication of his widely read article on BaseballProspectus.com in 2001), McCracken also discussed other pitcher characteristics that might influence BABIP. In 2002 McCracken created and published version 2.0 of dERA, which incorporates the ability of knuckleballers and other types of pitchers to affect the number of hits allowed on balls hit in the field of play (BHFP).

== Controversy ==
Controversy over DIP was heightened when Tom Tippett at Diamond Mind published his own findings in 2003. Tippett concluded that the differences between pitchers in preventing hits on balls in play were at least partially the result of the pitcher's skill. Tippett analyzed certain groups of pitchers that appear to be able to reduce the number of hits allowed on balls hit into the field of play (BHFP). Like McCracken, Tippett found that pitchers' BABIP was more volatile on an annual basis than the rates at which they gave up home runs or walks. It was this greater volatility that had led McCracken to conclude pitchers had "little or no control" over hits on balls in play. But Tippett also found large and significant differences between pitchers' career BABIP. In many cases, it was these differences that accounted for the pitchers' relative success.

However, improvements to DIP that look at more nuanced defense-independent stats than strikeouts, home runs, and walks (such as groundball rate), have been able to account for many of the BABIP differences that Tippet identified without reintroducing the noise from defense variability.

Despite other criticisms, the work by McCracken on DIP is regarded by many in the sabermetric community as the most important piece of baseball research in many years. As Jonah Keri wrote in 2012, "When Voros McCracken wrote his seminal piece on pitching and defense 11 years ago, he helped change the way people—fans, writers, even general managers—think about run prevention in baseball. Where once we used to throw most of the blame for a hit on the pitcher who gave it up, McCracken helped us realize that a slew of other factors go into whether a ball hit into play falls for a hit. For many people in the game and others who simply watch it, our ability to recognize the influence of defense, park effects, and dumb luck can be traced back to that one little article".

DIP ERA was added to ESPN.com's Sortable Stats in 2004.

== See also ==
- Baseball statistics
- Defense-Independent ERA
- Defense-Independent Component ERA
- Pitch quantification
- Sabermetrics
- Voros McCracken
