= Baseball Mogul =

Video game series

Baseball Mogul 2024
- Developer: Sports Mogul
- Publisher: Sports Mogul
- Designer: Clay Dreslough
- Platform: Windows
- Release: March 26, 2024
- Genre: Sports management
- Modes: Single player, multiplayer

Baseball Mogul is a series of career baseball management computer games created by game designer Clay Dreslough. The product was first published in 1997. The 27th and latest installment is Baseball Mogul 2024. A proprietary database, included with the game, permits play in any season of historical baseball from 1901 to the present. The early Baseball Mogul games are considered to be influential works within the baseball management simulation genre.

== Versions ==
The Baseball Mogul series has incorporated many features over the years. Examples include sortable statistics in more than 150 categories, more realistic aging curves, and detailed scouting reports.

=== Baseball Mogul 2017 ===
- New code to help develop player ratings from historical data
- More accurate defensive ratings
- Improved model for player health and injury rates

=== Baseball Mogul 2016 ===
- 70% faster simulations
- Player rating editor
- Improved player aging
- 2016 Rosters
- Added PITCHf/x data

=== Baseball Mogul Diamond ===
- 2015 Rosters updated by an independent source for improved accuracy
- Free agent compensation
- Improved aging model, including moving players down the defensive spectrum as they age
- New AI for improved managing of computer-controlled teams' rosters

=== Baseball Mogul 2015 ===
- 2014 Rosters
- Updated historical database through 2013
- Build your own expansion team

=== Baseball Mogul 2014 ===
- 2013 Rosters
- Updated historical database through 2012
- Individual player strategy settings

=== Baseball Mogul 2013 ===
- 2012 Rosters updated by an independent source for improved accuracy.
- Updated historical database through 2011
- Correct 2012 MLB Schedule
- New play-by-play engine based on physics rather than a random number generator.
- New charts on players' scouting cards give heat maps and break down performance in specific situations.
- Career head-to-head stats added.

=== Baseball Mogul 2012 ===
- 2011 Rosters with ratings for over 2,000 active players.
- Updated historical database
- Correct 2011 MLB schedule, with support for starting seasons as early as March 1.
- New Play-by play improvements (stadium backgrounds, ability to use pitchers as hitters and vice versa, multiple runners may now tag up, truck the catcher, and wall climb among other things.)
- New stats such as WAR (Wins Above Replacement)

=== Baseball Mogul 2011 ===
- Free Agent Bidding Wars - The CPU will engage in a bidding war over high-priced free agents with the user.
- New "Skip Inning" Button - During a game a user can now skip through innings he or she does not wish to play, and then return to the game.
- All-Star Game playable in Play-By-Play Mode - A user can now play the All-Star game.
- 2010 Rosters and Ratings
- 2010 MLB Schedule
- Thousands of small improvements in gameplay, league setup and simulation, and roster control.

=== Baseball Mogul 2010 ===
- Expansion teams - You can now start as an expansion team and run the expansion draft for yourself.
- Custom Leagues - Play different teams and players from different eras in one league.
- 2009 Rosters and Ratings
- 2009 MLB Schedule
- More realistic historical season simulator.
- New Roster options - You can now adjust the number of pitchers that a team carries on their major league roster, ranging from 8 of 25 to 14 of 25. Minor league pitchers can also be assigned a role in the minor leagues of Starter, Spot Starter, Long Reliever, Middle Reliever, Short Reliever, or Closer.

=== Baseball Mogul 2009 ===
Developed and published by Sports Mogul.

- Added new pre-game screens - Instead of adjusting all the settings themselves, players now have five options on this new screen: Modern, Classic, Fictional, Expansion, or Custom (used with player-made rosters.)
- Base-running screen - Players can now see where the ball is on the field in situations where they have an opportunity to tag up or take an extra base.
- Play-by-play improvements - The sound effects and crowd sounds have been replaced, and the ball physics have been improved.
- Depth Chart Screen - A depth chart screen has been added to help players view all of their talent and shop for free agents.
- Status Bar - Allows you to see breaking news stories without interrupting your game.

Features:

- Baseball Mogul Encyclopedia - Outputs interlinked HTML pages. Historical leaders tracked for over 70 stats, by team and season; hitting, pitching and fielding stats at every level; annual financial records.
- Database Engine - Records every stat for every player, even after they're dead. Also automatically loads every historical player to easily compare promising rookies to the best players of all time.
- Financial Model - Automatically adjusts revenue levels and salaries to the correct level for each era.
- Player Development Engine - More realistic aging and scouting algorithms. Draft day is now more unpredictable, with the ability to adjust these settings.
- Physics-Based Simulation - Follow the path of the ball on-screen, with correct underlying physics.
- Expanded Scouting Report - More room for more stats like OPS, GDP, Intentional Walks, Ground Ball Percent, and DICE.
- 2007 Rosters - Off-season moves, free agent signings, and trades. Detailed career stats, ratings, contracts and projections as of Opening Day. Plus new hand-edited data for over 2,500 minor leaguers.
- Updated Player Database - Includes more than 18,000 players from 1901 through 2007 using the Lahman database.
- Updated Pitcher Database - Season-by-season pitch data for over 1,200 pitchers. Includes individually researched listings for every pitch in each pitcher's arsenal, going back to 1901.

Baseball Mogul 2009 has an average score of 65 on Metacritic. Reviewers complained there were not enough new features.

=== Baseball Mogul 2008 ===
Baseball Mogul 2008 was the best-selling PC baseball game of 2007, selling over 115,000 units.

=== Baseball Mogul 2007 ===
Developed by Sports Mogul. Published by Enlight Software. Released 4 April 2007.

Features:

- Animated play-by-play for all games.
- In-game Manager Mode to call plays and make substitutions.
- Pitch-by-pitch mode for complete control of the game, with graphical batting and pitching interface to pinpoint each pitch.
- Individually researched ratings for each pitcher's arsenal, going back to 1901. Platoon statistics (lefties batting against righties, and vice versa) are accounted for.
- A Minor League simulation engine simulates every pitch from AAA to high school for the entire league.
- 11-point personality profiles for every player and every team, affecting contract negotiations, on-field performance, and team chemistry.

The game now has MLBPA licensing, while early versions required players to input their own team names and used fake player names. (i.e.: Bill Mueller is Bert Mack and Barry Bonds is Bert Brundage. Players had the same initials as their major league counterparts but different first and last names)

Baseball Mogul 2007 was the best-selling PC baseball game of 2006, selling over 100,000 units according to NPD data.

=== Baseball Mogul 2006 ===
Baseball Mogul 2006 was developed by Sports Mogul and released on Mar 15, 2005. It received average to high review scores. Computer Gaming World and Computer Games Mag awarded 3.5 and 3 out of 5 respectively, while PC Gamer awarded 90% and GameSpot 8.0 out of 10. GameSpot highlighted the addition of Lahman Database support, player personalities and realistic features such as expansion drafts and arbitration. The simplistic financial model was criticized, as was the lack of long-requested features such as lefty/righty splits and more managerial options.

=== Baseball Mogul 2005 ===
Developed by Sports Mogul.

=== Baseball Mogul 2004 ===
Developed by Sports Mogul. Published by Hip Interactive.

The amateur draft was not included in early versions of the game, as instead the computer randomly generated new players and put them in the minor leagues at the start of each new season. It was not until Baseball Mogul 2004 that the amateur draft was created.

=== Baseball Mogul 2003 ===
Developed by Sports Mogul. Published by Monkeystone Games.

=== Baseball Mogul 2002 ===
Developed and published by Sports Mogul in March 2002

=== Baseball Mogul 2000 ===
Developed and published by Infinite Monkey Systems.

=== Baseball Mogul 99 ===
Developed by Infinite Monkey Systems. Published by WizardWorks.

=== Baseball Mogul ===
Developed and published by Infinite Monkey Systems.

Baseball Mogul tied with CART Precision Racing to win Computer Gaming World's 1997 "Sports Game of the Year" award. The editors called it "about as humble as games get, but it was more original than any sports title this year".

== Other games using the Baseball Mogul engine ==
Microsoft Baseball 2001 was an action-oriented baseball game that used the Baseball Mogul engine and allowed players to control the franchise. MLB Slugfest and MLB Slugfest: Loaded are a series of action-oriented baseball games for PS2, Xbox and GameCube that used the Baseball Mogul engine for in-game and franchise simulation.

== Gameplay ==
Prior to Baseball Mogul 2007, all games were simulated, with the player assuming the combined role of general manager/manager/owner. Players oversee an entire baseball franchise, and possess the ability to set batting lineups, make trades, and set ticket and concession prices. Baseball Mogul 2007 added a play-by-play option to control every pitch of a game.

Baseball Mogul relies primarily on text-based menus.

=== Configuration ===
When starting a new game, the player must choose from one of five options:

- Modern - Take control of a team with its Opening Day 2019 roster.
- Classic - Play in any year from 1901 through the present.
- Fictional - Play in a league with fictional players and fictional team names. This takes a bit longer to start because it simulates some fictional years to develop stats for the players that will appear on each team.
- Expansion - Play any of the 14 expansion teams that developed between 1961 and 1998. As of Baseball Mogul 2015, players can also create their own team in a city of their choice, with the AI making a second team to have 32 teams overall. Players can manually add up to eight teams (a total of 40) through the League Editor, but there is no Expansion Draft in these situations, so the expansion teams created by this method will struggle more than historical ones did.
- Custom - This allows you to use any saved game as your Universe. This is how player-made rosters are used in-game.

After selecting one of those five options the players must choose the level of difficulty (Fan, Coach, Manager, or Mogul). The opposing AI strengthens, and the player's initial operating budget shrinks with each increment in difficulty. The following options further determine the nature of the game's simulation and are listed under "Advanced Options":

- Equalize Cities generates cities and regions with identical population bases. This offers an advantage to real-world teams from smaller markets, such as the Tampa Bay Rays or the Cincinnati Reds.
- Shuffle All Teams reassigns every roster, so each team has a random set of players.
- Fictional Players generates a new set of players with statistics based on players from the era chosen by the player.
- Fictional Teams renames all teams, complete with nicknames (i.e. the San Francisco Giants become the California Cowboys). It does not create any teams in cities that do not already have a Major League Franchise, and the Team History option still shows the actual team's history up until the year the league started.
- Fictional Rookies supplies randomly generated rookies to the Amateur Draft. This option may be combined with Historical Rookies, but it will automatically be on if Historical Rookies is turned off.
- Historical Rookies supplies historical players (and associated data) as rookies to the Amateur Draft. Only players with Major League experience qualify, and the depth of the player pool depends on the game year. Lack of data may produce player shortages if Fictional Rookies is disabled. Games set in the present cannot enable Historical Rookies.
- Don't Randomize Players smooths fluctuations in player performance, allowing more accurate prediction of game outcomes. This was formerly named Simulation Mode.

=== Player ratings ===
A variety of player attributes are rated numerically on a 100-point scale, though none are likely to score lower than 40 or 50 except for relief pitchers' Endurance. Ratings vary over time with player development, aging, and injuries suffered. All players possess an Overall rating, a combination of all other measures weighted by position, a Peak projection of overall performance at the height of his career, and an indication of Health, the likelihood of succumbing to personal injury, which declines with age and major injuries.

Position players are rated for a variety of measures of batting, baserunning, and fielding prowess. Contact and Power ratings correlate to a batter's ability to connect with pitches and do so solidly, influencing batting average and extra base hits. Swinging-at-a-pitch determination, or not, relates to the Eye rating, with highly rated players properly identifying good pitches from bad. Laying down bunts and running the bases are also measured, by Bunt and Speed ratings. Defensive talent is broken into Range, Arm, and Fielding ratings, measuring aptitudes to reach and quickly dispose of batted balls with skill and consistency.

Pitchers are rated for a variety of measures of pitching skills. Power measures pitch velocity and strikeout rate. Accuracy in pitch placement and walk rate relates to a pitcher's Control rating. Movement indicates the action, or movement, on pitches thrown, with highly rated pitchers inducing more ground balls or popups from opposing batters. Endurance roughly indicates the pitch count that can be thrown before fatigue sets in, adversely affecting velocity, control, or movement.

Batting and fielding skills for pitchers are conflated into "Hitting" and "Defense" ratings, respectively, with values comparable only to other pitchers. For example, a Hitting score of 90 would not qualify a pitcher to start as a position player.

=== Online play ===
Many players choose to run leagues with their friends using Baseball Mogul. This gameplay is similar to fantasy baseball, except that the games are simulated by the engine and thus leagues can continue beyond the Major League Baseball season.

The league commissioner posts game results as a saved game file, and each player downloads this file, makes adjustments to his team, and sends his updated file to the league commissioner.

=== Deprecated features (in previous versions) ===
- For several early versions, Baseball Mogul used a "point" system instead of dollars for assessing values for contracts.
- Players used to be graded by letter grades and are now graded numerically. This allows for a greater degree of granularity in assessing players. For example, both an 80 and an 82 would be displayed as a 'B−', but one is slightly better than the other, and the numerical scale covers that difference.

== Updates and patches ==
About once a month, Sports Mogul will add a patch based on bugs reported by players in the forums. When a version is X.5 or higher, it is considered a beta of the next Baseball Mogul iteration. For example, 15.50 would have been considered an open beta for Baseball Mogul 2014. On the Sports Mogul forums, players report bugs with the current patch and also can request ideas for future version of the game.
