= 2019 Major League Baseball Home Run Derby =

Baseball competition

- Date: July 8, 2019
- Venue: Progressive Field
- City: Cleveland, Ohio
- Winner: Pete Alonso
- Score: 23–22

The 2019 Major League Baseball Home Run Derby was a home run hitting contest between eight batters from Major League Baseball (MLB). The derby was held on July 8, 2019, at Progressive Field in Cleveland, Ohio, the site of the 2019 MLB All-Star Game. In an effort to lure more big name players to the Derby compared to previous seasons, MLB increased the winner's prize to $1 million with the total pool money being increased to $2.5 million, up from $525,000 in 2018.

The longest home run, amongst the total 312 hit by the 8 players involved, covered a distance of 488 ft (148.74 m), and was hit by the runner-up of the contest, Vladimir Guerrero Jr.

This was the first derby since the format change in 2015 to feature tie-breaking rounds, as Vladimir Guerrero Jr. and Joc Pederson went to a record three swing-offs in the second round. Additionally, Guerrero Jr. surpassed the previous first and second round records for home runs hit by Josh Hamilton in 2008 and Kyle Schwarber in 2018 respectively. Winner Pete Alonso of the New York Mets hit 23 home runs in the final round, also breaking the final round total set by Giancarlo Stanton in 2016. The total tally of 312 home runs is the most in the history of the event.

== Rules ==
Eight players participate in the derby in a bracket-style, single-elimination timed event. Each player has four minutes to hit as many home runs as possible. Hitters are awarded an additional 30 seconds if they hit two home runs over 440 ft (134.11 m). Hitters are also allowed one 45 second timeout to stop the clock (two in the finals).

The eight competing players are seeded 1-8 based on their home run totals. While the lower seed hits first, the higher seed hits second in all rounds. The round ends if the higher seed exceeds the total of the first hitter. In the event of a tie, two sets of tiebreakers are employed: first, a 1-minute swing-off (with no timeouts nor bonus time awarded); thereafter, multiple three-swing sets will occur until the tie is broken.

== Bracket ==
By June 30, 2019, Toronto Blue Jays third baseman Vladimir Guerrero Jr., Cleveland Indians first baseman Carlos Santana, New York Mets first baseman Pete Alonso, Pittsburgh Pirates first baseman Josh Bell, Milwaukee Brewers outfielder Christian Yelich, and Atlanta Braves outfielder Ronald Acuña Jr. had agreed to participate in the derby. However, on July 7, 2019, Yelich was forced to withdraw from the derby due to a back injury. As a result, Oakland Athletics third baseman Matt Chapman was selected by the league to replace Yelich. Guerrero set a new single-round record with 29 home runs in the first round, and he and Joc Pederson matched the feat in round two. Both Guerrero and Pederson tied with eight home runs in a tiebreaker, matched with one home run in a three-swing swing-off, before Guerrero prevailed in a second swing-off by a score of 2–1.

Quarterfinals
1	Matt Chapman (OAK)	13
8	Vladimir Guerrero Jr. (TOR)	29
4	Alex Bregman (HOU)	16
5	Joc Pederson (LAD)	21
3	Josh Bell (PIT)	18
6	Ronald Acuña Jr. (ATL)	25
2	Pete Alonso (NYM)	14
7	Carlos Santana (CLE)	13

Semifinals
8	Vladimir Guerrero Jr.	40*
5	Joc Pederson	39
6	Ronald Acuña Jr.	19
2	Pete Alonso	20

Finals
8	Vladimir Guerrero Jr.	22
2	Pete Alonso	23

* Round went into two swing-offs after Guerrero Jr. and Pederson were tied 29–29 after regulation and 37–37 after first tiebreaker. After the first swing-off, Guerrero Jr. and Pederson both had 38. The second swing-off resulted in Guerrero Jr. narrowly edging out Pederson by a score of 40-39.
