= Defense-Independent Component ERA =

Defense-Independent Component ERA (DICE) is a 21st-century variation on Component ERA, one of an increasing number of baseball sabermetrics that fall under the umbrella of defense independent pitching statistics. DICE was created by Clay Dreslough in 2001.

The formula for Defense-Independent Component ERA (DICE) is:

$$\text{DICE} =3.00 + \frac {13HR + 3(BB + HBP) - 2K}{IP}$$

In that equation, "HR" is home runs, "BB" is walks, "HBP" is hit batters, "K" is strikeouts, and "IP" is innings pitched. That equation gives a number that is better at predicting a pitcher's ERA in the following year than the pitcher's actual ERA in the current year.

Component ERA was created by Bill James to create a more accurate way of evaluating pitchers than earned run average (ERA). Whereas ERA is significantly affected by luck (such as whether the component hits are allowed consecutively), Component ERA eliminates this factor and assigns a weight to each of the recorded 'components' of a pitchers performance. For CERA, these are singles, doubles, triples, home runs, walks and hit batters.

DICE is an improvement on CERA that removes the contribution of the pitcher's defense, instead estimating a pitcher's ERA from the components of his pitching record that don't involve defense. These are home runs, walks, hit batters and strikeouts.
