= Batting average on balls in play =

Term in baseball sabermetrics

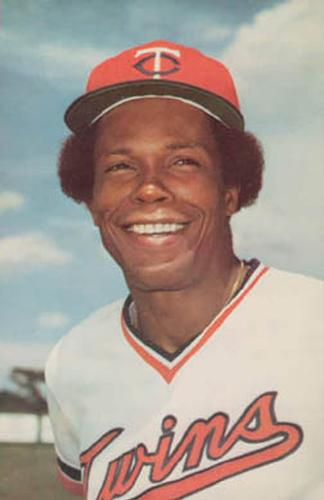
Rod Carew had a .408 BABIP in 1977, the best single-season BABIP since 1924.

In baseball statistics, batting average on balls in play (abbreviated BABIP) is a measurement of how often batted balls result in hits, excluding home runs. It can be expressed as, "when you hit the ball and it’s not a home run, what’s your batting average?" The statistic is typically used to evaluate individual batters and individual pitchers.

== Calculation ==
BABIP is computed per the following equation, where H is hits, HR is home runs, AB is at bats, K is strikeouts, and SF is sacrifice flies.

$BABIP = \frac{H-HR}{AB-K-HR+SF}$

=== Effect ===
As compared to batting average, which is simply hits divided by at bats, BABIP excludes home runs and strikeouts from consideration while treating sacrifice flies as hitless at bats.

In Major League Baseball (MLB), .300 is considered an average BABIP. Various factors can impact BABIP, such as a player's home ballpark; for batters, being speedy enough to reach base on infield hits; or, for pitchers, the quality of their team's defense.

== Leaders in Major League Baseball ==
For major-league players, the .383 BABIP of Ty Cobb is the highest for a career (players must have at least 3,000 career plate appearances to qualify). Cobb also holds the single-season major-league record, having posted a .444 BABIP during the 1911 season (players must have at least 3.1 plate appearances per team game played to qualify).

== Usage ==
BABIP is commonly used as a red flag in sabermetric analysis, as a consistently high or low BABIP is hard to maintain—much more so for pitchers than hitters. Therefore, BABIP can be used to spot outlying seasons by pitchers. As with other statistical measures, those pitchers whose BABIPs are extremely high (bad) can often be expected to improve in the following season, and those pitchers whose BABIPs are extremely low (good) can often be expected to regress in the following season.

While a pitcher's BABIP may vary from season to season, there are distinct differences between pitchers when looking at career BABIP figures.

== See also ==
- Defense independent pitching statistics
