= Component ERA =

Component ERA or ERC is a baseball statistic invented by Bill James. It attempts to forecast a pitcher's earned run average (ERA) from the number of hits and walks allowed rather than the standard formula of average number of earned runs per nine innings. ERC allows one to take a fresh look at a pitcher's performance and gauge if his results are more or less than the sum of its parts.

The formula for ERC as it appears in the 2004 edition of the Bill James Handbook:

$ERC = 9 * {{(H + BB + HBP)*PTB \over BFP * IP}} - 0.56$

where H is hits, BB is bases on balls (walks), HBP is hit by pitch, BFP is batters faced by pitcher, IP is innings pitched, and PTB is pitcher's total bases and is defined as:

$PTB = 0.89 * (1.255*(H-HR) + 4*HR) + 0.56 * (BB + HBP -IBB)$

where HR is home runs, IBB is intentional walks, and others are as above.

The point of the first component is to represent the number of baserunners allowed. The PTB component combines an estimate of extra bases allowed (first half) with the fact that walks and hit by pitches do not advance unforced baserunners (second half). The division places the computation into an ERA context, and the final subtraction moves that scale down into its normal range.

Where intentional walk data are not available use:

$PTB = 0.89 * (1.255*(H-HR) + 4*HR) + 0.475 * (BB + HBP)$

If ERC is less than 2.24, the formula is adjusted as follows:

$ERC = 9 * {{(H + BB + HBP)*PTB \over BFP * IP}} * 0.75$

Other people and organizations have their own proprietary formulae for ERC which may correlate more highly with actual earned runs scored than the formula above.

Component ERA was added to the ESPN.com "Sortable Stats" in 2004.

== See also ==
- Earned Run Average
- DIPS
- WHIP
