= Glossary of baseball terms =

This is an alphabetical list of selected unofficial and specialized terms, phrases, and other jargon used in baseball, along with their definitions, including illustrative examples for many entries.

== 0–9 ==
=== 0 ===
"Oh and ..." See count.

=== 1 ===
The number 1 in baseball refers to the pitcher's position, a shorthand call for throwing to first, a single hit, and a fastball sign.

=== 1-2-3 inning ===
An inning in which a pitcher faces only three batters and none safely reaches a base. "Three up, three down."

=== 1-2-3 double play ===
A double play in which the pitcher (1) fields a batted ball and throws home to the catcher (2), who retires a runner advancing from third. The catcher then throws to the first baseman (3) to force out the batter. These almost always happen with the bases loaded.

=== 1-6-3 double play ===
The pitcher (1) fields a batted ball and throws to the shortstop (6) to force out a runner advancing to second. The shortstop then throws to the first baseman (3) to force out the batter.

=== 2 ===
Catcher (2) gets a "Two!" call for throws to second, a "two-bagger" is a double, and the number 2 signs for a curveball.

=== 2–2–2 (2 balls, 2 strikes, 2 outs) ===
See deuces wild.

=== 20–80 scale ===
MLB scouts use a 20-80 scale to grade players: 50 is average (MLB level), with 20 being very low and 80 elite. Applies to overall ability & specific skills like hitting or pitching speed.

=== 3 ===
The first baseman (3) receives throws with shouts of "Three!", nabs runners attempting triples ("three-baggers"), and the number 3 might signal a slider from the pitcher.

=== 3-2-3 double play ===
The first baseman (3) fields a batted ball and throws to the catcher (2), who retires a runner advancing from third and then throws back to the first baseman to force out the batter. These almost always happen with the bases loaded.

=== 3-6 double play ===
The first baseman (3) fields a batted ball, steps on first (to force the batter out), and then throws to the shortstop (6), who tags out a runner. Another possibility is a line drive caught by the first baseman, who throws to the shortstop, who then steps on second base for a second out.

=== 3-6-1 double play ===
The first baseman (3) fields a batted ball and throws to the shortstop (6) to force out a runner at second. The shortstop then throws to the pitcher (1) (who is now covering first because the first baseman was busy fielding the ball) to force out the batter.

=== 3-4-3 double play ===
The first baseman (3) fields a batted ball and throws to the second baseman (4) to force out a runner at second. The second baseman then throws back to the first baseman to force out the batter.

=== 3-6-3 double play ===
The first baseman (3) fields a batted ball and throws to the shortstop (6) to force out a runner at second. The shortstop then throws back to the first baseman to force out the batter.

=== 4 ===
- The second baseman, in scorekeeping shorthand.
- A shout of "Four!" indicates the ball should be thrown to home plate.
- A "four-bagger" is a home run.
- In the context of pitching, the number 4 is a common sign (and nickname) for a change-up.

=== 4-6-3 double play ===
The second baseman (4) fields a batted ball and throws to the shortstop (6), who forces out a runner at second and then throws to the first baseman (3) to force out the batter.

=== 45-foot line ===
The 45-foot line in baseball marks the area a batter-runner must stay in to avoid being called out for interfering when running to first base.

=== 45-degree line ===
An informal term referring to a hypothetical line drawn at a 45 degree angle from the front plane of the #rubber to the first base line. It can be used as a reference point to determine whether a left handed pitcher legally stepped at first base while attempting a pickoff. A pitcher is required to step to the base to which he is throwing, and failing to do so is a balk.

=== 4 wide ones ===
Four consecutive pitches deliberately wide of the strike zone. Preacher Roe summarized this strategy to Stan Musial as "I throw him four wide ones and try to pick him off at first."

=== 5 ===
The third baseman, in scorekeeping shorthand.

=== 5 hole ===
- Between a player's legs (the catcher's in particular). From the hockey term for how a puck is advanced past the goalie ("through the five hole").

=== 5.5 hole ===
The space between the third baseman (5) and shortstop (6).

Made famous by perennial batting champion Tony Gwynn of the San Diego Padres as his description of where he liked to hit the baseball.

=== 5-4-3 double play ===
The third baseman (5) fields a batted ball and throws to the second baseman (4) to force out a runner advancing from first. The second baseman then throws to the first baseman (3) to force out the batter.

=== 5-4-3 triple play ===
3rd baseman (5) fields a hard-hit ball and steps on third for a force out on R2 (6), then throws a laser to 2nd Baseman (4) to force out R1 (7) at second. Finally, 2nd Baseman (4) fires the ball to 1st Baseman (3) to complete the triple play by retiring the batter (2).

=== 5-tool player ===
A position player (non-pitcher) like Willie Mays, Mickey Mantle, Andre Dawson, Duke Snider, Vladimir Guerrero, and Ken Griffey Jr., who excels at:
1. hitting for average
2. hitting for power
3. base running
4. throwing
5. fielding

=== 6 ===
The shortstop, in scorekeeping shorthand.

=== 6-4-3 double play ===
The shortstop (6) fields a batted ball and throws to the second baseman (4), who forces out a runner advancing from first and then throws to the first baseman (3) to force out the batter.

=== 7 ===
The leftfielder, in scorekeeping shorthand.

=== 7-2, 8-2, or 9-2 double play ===
A fly ball is caught by an outfielder, and a runner tries to tag up and score from third but is tagged out by the catcher.

=== 8 ===
The centerfielder, in scorekeeping shorthand.

=== 9 ===
The rightfielder, in scorekeeping shorthand.

=== 9 to 0 ===
The official score of a forfeited game in Major League Baseball.

=== 12–6 curveball ===
A type of curveball, the motion of which evokes the hands of a clock.

=== 30-30 club ===
Players who hit 30 home runs and steal 30 bases in a single season.

=== 40-40 club ===
Players who hit 40 home runs and steal 40 bases in a single season.

=== 50-50 club ===
Players who hit 50 home runs and steal 50 bases in a single season.

=== 55-footer ===
A pejorative term for a pitch that bounces short of the 60 1/2 feet between the pitching rubber and the plate.

=== 90 feet ===
When a runner advances one base, he "moves up 90 feet"—the distance between successive bases. A runner on third base is "90 feet away" from scoring.

== A ==
=== A-Ball or Class A ===
As of the 2022 season, "Class A" is the lowest grouping of modern affiliated minor league baseball, with sub-categories of "High-A" and "Single-A". "Short-Season A" leagues also existed before 2021. High-A is divided into three leagues: Midwest League, Northwest League, and South Atlantic League. Single-A is also divided into three leagues: California League, Carolina League, and Florida State League.

=== AA ===
- "Double-A" (AA) is the second-highest level of minor league baseball (below AAA), and as of 2022 includes the Eastern League, the Southern League, and the Texas League.
- "AA" is also the abbreviation for the American Association, which has been the name of numerous professional baseball leagues: a short-lived major league of the 19th century, a minor league for much of the 20th century, and an independent minor league that became a "Partner League" of Major League Baseball in 2021.

=== AAA ===
"Triple-A" is the highest level of minor league baseball. As of 2022, this level includes the International League and the Pacific Coast League.

=== AAAA player ===
"AAAA player" ("Four-A player," or alternatively, "Quadruple-A player") is a term for a minor-league player who is consistently successful in the high minor leagues (AAA), but cannot translate that into success at the major-league level. Poor management can be responsible. "AAAA" may also informally refer to high-quality but unaffiliated foreign baseball leagues outside North America where play is considered less competitive than in MLB but more competitive than in AAA; this is usually restricted to describing Japan's NPB.

=== aboard ===
When a runner is on base. When there are runners safely on base, there are "runners aboard".

=== ace ===
The best starting pitcher on the team, who is usually first on a pitching rotation.

=== advance a runner ===
To move a runner ahead safely to another base, often the conscious strategy of a team that plays small ball. If a batter does make an out, his plate appearance will have been less negative if he still got a runner into scoring position; in certain situations, batters even deliberately sacrifice themselves.

=== ahead in the count ===
- A term that signifies whether the batter or pitcher possesses the advantage in an at-bat. If a pitcher has thrown more strikes than balls to a batter in an at-bat, the pitcher is ahead in the count; conversely, if the pitcher has thrown more balls than strikes, the batter is ahead.
- If the pitcher is ahead in the count, the batter is in increasing danger of striking out. If the batter is ahead, the pitcher is in increasing danger of walking him.

=== aim the ball ===
Sometimes when a pitcher tries a bit too carefully to control the location of a pitch, he is said to "aim the ball" instead of throwing it. This is a different meaning of "aim" from the situation in which a pitcher aims a pitch at a batter in an effort to hit him.

=== airmail ===
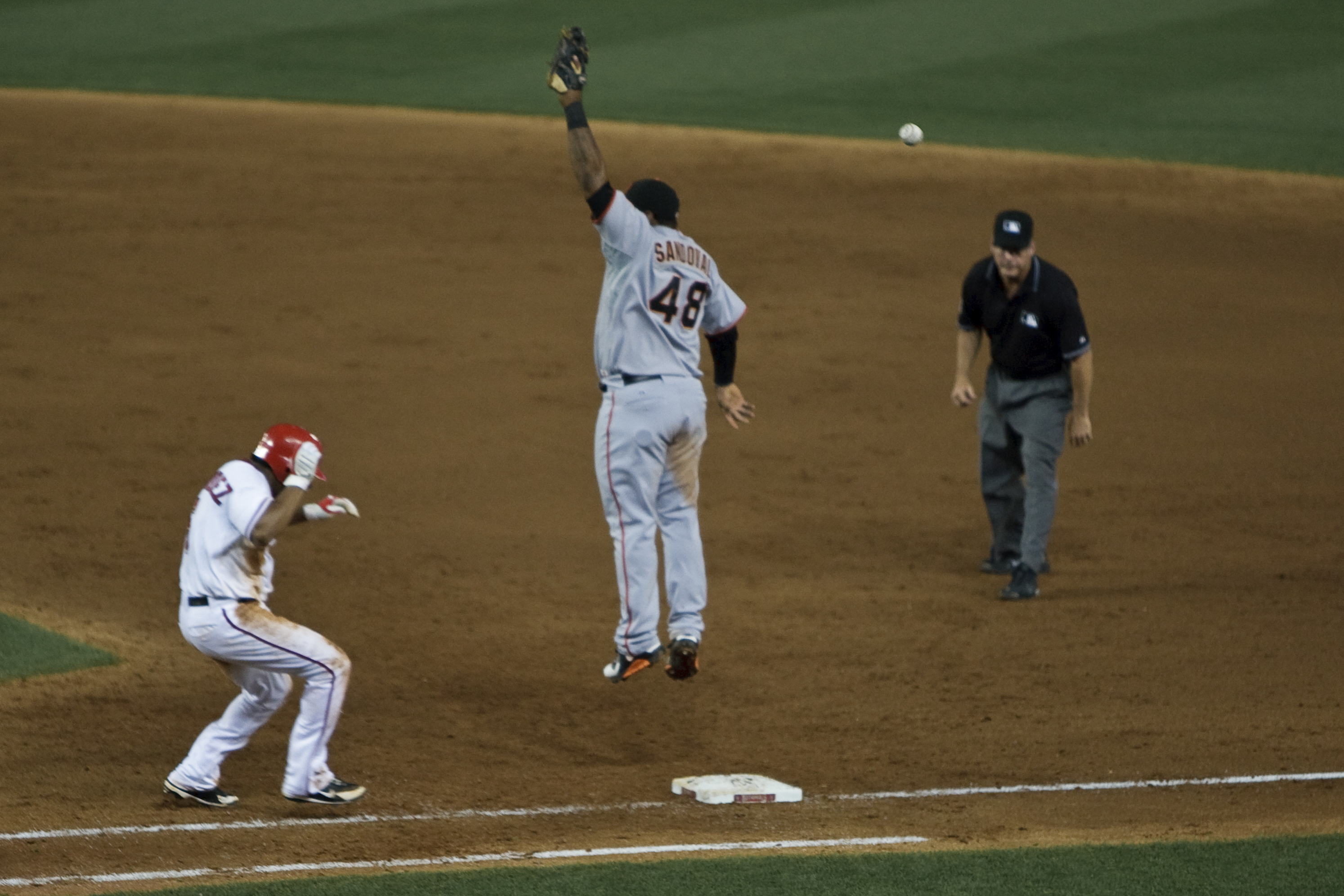
A throw is airmailed over the head of San Francisco Giants first baseman Pablo Sandoval.

Slang for a fielder's errant throw that sails high over the player to whom he intended to throw the ball. For example, if the third baseman were to throw the ball over the first baseman's head and into the stands, he is said to have "airmailed" the throw. "But Chandler airmailed her throw to third into the dugout ..."

=== alabaster blast ===
Coined by Pittsburgh Pirates announcer Bob Prince, this was a hit made sharply downward in the infield, like a Baltimore chop, that would bounce higher than normal due to the extraordinarily hard dirt at Forbes Field, allowing the batter time to safely reach first base.

=== alley ===
Also "gap" or "power alley", the space between the leftfielder and the centerfielder, or the rightfielder and centerfielder. If a batter hits the ball "up the alley" with enough force, he has a stronger chance of advancing beyond first base and being credited with an extra-base hit. Typically, this is an appropriate term for describing a line drive or ground ball; fly balls that hit the wall are not normally described this way.

=== ambush ===
Swinging at (and especially hitting) the first pitch.

=== American League (AL) ===
The junior of the two existing Major Leagues.

=== American League Championship Series (ALCS) ===
The season's final best-of-seven playoff series which determines the American League team that will advance to the World Series. The ALCS–like its analog, the NLCS–came into being in 1969. The ALCS winner takes the American League pennant and the title of American League Champion for that season. The winners of the American League Division Series have met in the ALCS since 1995.

=== American League Division Series (ALDS) ===
The second round of the league playoffs. The top two division winners and the winners of the two Wild Card series are paired off in two best-of-five series, the winners of which advance to the ALCS.

=== Annie Oakley ===
A free ticket to attendance at a ballgame or to first base (a "free pass" or "base on balls").

=== appeal play ===
A play in which the defense has an opportunity to gain a favorable ruling from an umpire by addressing a mistake by the offense or seeking the input of another umpire. Appeals require the defense to make a verbal appeal to an appropriate umpire, or if the situation being appealed is obvious a player may indicate an appeal with a gesture. The onus is on the defense to make an appeal; umpires will not announce potential appeal situations such as runners failing to touch a base, batting out of order, or unchecked swings until an appeal is made.

=== Arizona Fall League (AFL) ===
A short-season minor league in which high-level prospects from all thirty Major League Baseball clubs are organized into six teams on which players have the opportunity to refine and showcase their skills for evaluation by coaches, scouts, and executives. Such teams are referred to as "scout teams" and "taxi squads".

=== arm ===
A metonym for a pitcher ("A's trade two young arms to Kansas City ...", "... Anthopoulos is just stockpiling arms in an attempt to lure a trade ...").

=== around the horn ===
- The infielders' practice of throwing the ball to each other after recording an out, provided there are no runners on base. The purpose is as much traditional as anything, but it serves as a way to celebrate the out. Typically, if an out is made at first base, the first baseman will throw to the shortstop, who throws to the second baseman, who throws to the third baseman, who returns the ball to the pitcher. Patterns vary from team to team, but the third baseman is usually the last infielder to receive a throw, regardless of the pattern.
- Throwing the ball around the horn is also done after a strikeout with no baserunners. The catcher will throw the ball to the third baseman, who then throws it to the second baseman, who throws it to the shortstop, who then throws it to the first baseman. Some catchers, such as Iván Rodríguez, prefer to throw the ball to the first baseman, who then begins the process in reverse. Some catchers determine to whom they will throw based on the handedness of the batter (to first for a right-handed batter because the line to the first baseman is not blocked and vice versa) or whether the team is in an overshift, when the third baseman would be playing close to where the shortstop normally plays and would require a harder throw to be reached.
- An additional application of this term is when a 5-4-3 double play has occurred, which mimics the pattern of throwing the ball around the horn.

=== arsonist ===
An ineffective relief pitcher. Usually a pitcher who comes into the game with no one on base but proceeds to give up several runs. Opposite of fireman.

=== ash ===
An old-fashioned word referring to a baseball bat, which is typically made of wood from an ash tree. "The shrewd manager substitutes a fast runner for a slow one, and sends in a pinch hitter when the man he takes out is just as good with the ash as the man he sends in."

=== aspirin ===
Slang for a fastball that is especially hard to hit due to its velocity and/or movement, in reference to the difficulty of making contact with something as small as an aspirin tablet. May additionally refer to batters seeing a pitched ball as relatively smaller than normal, a potential psychological effect on batters who are in a slump.

=== assist ===
The official scorer awards an assist to every defensive player who fields or touches the ball (after it has been hit by the batter) prior to a putout, even if the contact was unintentional. For example, if a ball strikes a player's leg and bounces off him to another fielder, who tags the baserunner, the first player is credited with an assist.

A fielder can receive only one assist per out recorded. A fielder also receives an assist if a putout would have occurred, had not another fielder committed an error.

=== associate team ===
In Negro league baseball, a team who was not granted league membership or agree to play a league schedule, but games played by league teams against this team will still count in league standings.

=== asterisk ===
A slang term for a baseball record that is disputed in popular opinion (i.e., unofficially) because of a perception that the record holder had an unfair advantage in attaining the record. It implies that the record requires a footnote explaining the purportedly unfair advantage, with the asterisk being a symbol commonly used in typography to call out footnotes. In recent times it has been prominently used in the following circumstances:
- The record holder is widely believed to have used performance-enhancing drugs, whether or not such use is proven or admitted. Barry Bonds was regularly greeted with banners and signs bearing an asterisk during the 2007 season when he broke Hank Aaron's career home run record. The ball Bonds hit for the record-breaking home run was subsequently branded with an asterisk before it was sent to the Baseball Hall of Fame.
- A holder of a single-season record accomplished the feat in a longer season, and thus had additional opportunities to break the record. A well-known example of this was when Roger Maris broke Babe Ruth's single-season home run record on the last day of a 162-game regular season in 1961, while Ruth set the previous record in a 154-game season in 1927; the asterisk usage is exemplified in the title of the film 61*, which was about Maris' quest to break Ruth's record. Baseball Commissioner Ford Frick declared that Maris's record should be listed separately from Ruth's (contrary to popular belief no asterisk was mentioned or used in this case), a decision not formally reversed until 1991.
- The Houston Astros' 2017 World Series championship, which was later marred by allegations of the Astros using technology to steal signs throughout the 2017 season. Fans of opposing teams, especially the Yankees and Dodgers, frequently employ the use of asterisks when referencing the team's season in 2017, often derisively calling the team the "Houston Asterisks".

=== at 'em ball ===
or "atom ball"; slang for a ball batted directly at a defender.

=== at bat ===
- A completed plate appearance by a batter which results in a base hit or a non-sacrifice out. At-bats (or "times at bat") are used for the calculation of a player's batting average and slugging percentage. Note that a plate appearance is not recorded as an "at-bat" if the batter reaches first base as a result of a base on balls, or hit by pitch, nor if he executes a sacrifice bunt or sacrifice fly.
- Occasionally a batter may be at the plate when the third out of the inning is made against a base-runner; in this case the batter will lead off the next inning with a clean strike count and his interrupted plate appearance is not counted as an at-bat.

=== at the letters ===
A pitch that crosses the plate at the height of the letters of the team's name on the shirt of the batter's uniform is said to be "at the letters", "letter-high" or "chest-high".

=== ate him up ===
Slang expression of the action of a batted ball that is difficult for a fielder to handle.

=== ate the ball ===
See: eat the ball

=== attack the strike zone ===
Slang for pitching aggressively by throwing strikes, rather than trying to trick hitters into swinging at pitches out of the strike zone or trying to "nibble at the corners" of the plate. Equivalent phrases are "pound the strike zone" and "challenge the hitters".

=== automatic double ===
A batted ball in fair territory which bounces out of play (e.g. into the seats) entitles the batter and all runners on base to advance two bases but no further. This term is used by some commentators in lieu of ground rule double, which refers to ground rules in effect at each ballpark.

=== automatic ball ===
- Since 2023 in MLB, a pitcher is charged with an automatic ball if he does not pitch the baseball before the pitch clock expires.

=== automatic strike ===
- A strike is deemed "automatic" when the pitcher grooves a strike–typically on a 3-0 count–with such confidence that the batter takes the pitch without swinging at it.
- Since 2023 in MLB, a batter is charged with an automatic strike if he is not in the batter's box and alert to the pitcher when there are at least 8 seconds remaining on the pitch clock.

=== away ===
- A pitch outside the strike zone, on the opposite side of the plate as the batter, is referred to as being "away", in contrast to a pitch thrown between the plate and the batter that is known as "inside".
- Slang for outs. For example, a two-out inning may be said to be "two away"; a strikeout may be referred to as "putting away" the batter.
- Games played at an opponent's home field are "away games". The visiting team is sometimes called the "away" team.

== B ==
=== backdoor breaking ball ===
A breaking pitch, usually a slider, curveball, or cut fastball that, due to its lateral motion, passes through a small part of the strike zone on the outside edge of the plate after seeming as if it would miss the plate entirely. It may not cross the front of the plate but only the back and thus have come in through the "back door". A slider is the most common version, because a slider has more lateral motion than other breaking pitches (it curves down and 'slides' across the zone).

=== backstop ===
- The fence behind home plate, designed to protect spectators from wild pitches or foul balls.
- Catcher, sometimes "backstopper".

=== back-to-back ===
Consecutive. When two consecutive batters hit home runs, they are said to hit back-to-back homers. Or a pitcher may issue back-to-back walks, and so forth.

=== backup ===
Opposite of "backdoor". Usually a mistake, a pitch that begins inside off home plate and breaks back over the plate. A pitch that does this is said to have "backed up".

=== bad-ball hitter ===
A batter who excels at hitting pitches that are outside the strike zone. Notable bad ball hitters include Yogi Berra and Vladimir Guerrero.

=== bad hop ===
A ball that bounces in front of an infielder in an unexpected way, often as a result of imperfections in the playing surface or the spin on the ball.

=== bag ===
A base. Also, a two-bagger is a double or two-base hit; a three-bagger is a triple or three-base hit; a four-bagger is a home run.

=== bail ===
- A batter who sees a pitch coming toward his head may "bail out" (hit the deck).
- When two fielders are converging on a fly ball, one of them may "bail out" to avoid running into the other.
- A relief pitcher may come into the game with men on base and bail the previous pitcher out of a jam.

While the first two examples are analogues to bailing out of a plane via parachute, the last one is akin to bailing out a boat on the verge of being swamped, or perhaps bailing somebody out of jail.

=== balk ===
A balk is considered to be one of baseball's more complicated rules. Balks are covered in rule 6.02(a) in the Official Baseball Rules as published by Major League Baseball. Generally speaking, a balk is any illegal action by the pitcher when there is a runner (or runners) on base.
- A pitcher who assumes a legal pitching position - the windup or set - may elect to deliver a pitch to the batter, legally disengage the rubber (by stepping back with the pivot foot and dropping his hands to his sides if he is in the windup position), or make a legal throw to a base in an attempt to put out a runner.
- Any motion which is naturally associated with delivering a pitch commits the pitcher to that delivery. Failing to complete the delivery is an illegal action. With no runners on base, a ball is awarded to the batter. With runners on base it is a balk.
  - A pitcher pitching from the set who swings his free foot beyond the back plane of the rubber is committed to delivering the pitch to the batter, unless he is making a legal throw or feint to second base. Otherwise it is a balk.
- The penalty for a balk is that each runner is awarded one base and the batter remains at bat with the same count. In the MLB (or in other leagues which use Official Baseball Rules) and the NCAA, certain balks are live ball balks, meaning that the penalty (if necessary) is applied at the end of the playing action. This is typically when a pitcher delivers a pitch without first coming legally set. The balk is vocalized by the umpire(s), but the batter may still elect to strike at the pitch. If at the end of the playing action each runner (including the batter-runner) has advanced at least one base, the balk is ignored. Otherwise the penalty is enforced and the batter returns with the same count. In NFHS (high school) rules, a balk is always a dead ball.
- The most common balk scenarios are when a pitcher fails to come fully set (if using the set position) before his delivery; or having coming set, starts his motion and stops again (sometimes called a "double set"); or failing to step directly at a base when attempting a pickoff throw. The general criteria used for determining if a pitcher has stepped at a base is a) did he gain ground toward the base as a result of his step; and b) did he step ahead of his throw; and c) (a bit more subjectively) did he step more toward the base than toward the batter in the case of a left handed pitcher throwing to first base.
- While primarily intended to protect the runner from any intentionally deceitful action by the pitcher, there are other scenarios where a balk may be called:
  - If the ball is inadvertently dropped while the pitcher is in contact with the rubber;
  - If the pitcher throws to an unoccupied base, unless it is an attempt to put out or drive back an advancing runner;
  - If after taking a legal pitching position (that is, if he has brought his hands together as required for the set or windup position) the pitcher removes his hand from the ball, unless it is in actually delivering a pitch or throwing to a base;
  - Failing to legally disengage the pitcher's plate by stepping back with the pivot foot when switching pitching positions (windup to set or vice versa);
  - If the pitcher stands on or astride the pitcher's plate without possession of the ball, or feints a pitching motion while not in contact with the pitcher's plate;
  - Making an illegal pitch, such as a quick pitch.
  - A catcher's balk is a type of illegal pitch called when a catcher is not inside of the catcher's box if the pitcher is attempting an intentional walk, and carries the same penalty as a balk if runners are on base. However, as pitchers are no longer required to deliver any pitches for an intentional walk, this is exceedingly rare, although it is still listed as an illegal action by the pitcher in rule 6.02(a)(12).
This list is not comprehensive, and the sometimes subjective nature of what constitutes a balk has often been a topic of hot debate. Balks are not reviewable.

=== ball ===
A pitch that misses the strike zone and is not swung at by the batter. (For the physical object used in the game, see baseball (ball).)

=== ball in play ===
In sabermetrics, "ball in play" and "batting average on balls in play" (BABIP) have specific technical definitions that are used to determine pitchers' ability independently of the fielding defense of a team. In this definition, a home run is not a ball in play. See Defense Independent Pitching Statistics. Also see in play.

=== Baltimore chop ===
A ball hit forcefully into the ground near home plate, producing a bounce high above the head of a fielder. This gives the batter time to reach first base safely before the ball can be fielded. An important element of Baltimore Orioles coach John McGraw's "inside baseball" strategy, the technique was popularized during Major League Baseball's dead-ball era, during which baseball teams could not rely on the home run.

To give the maximum bounce to a Baltimore chop, Orioles groundskeeper Tom Murphy packed the dirt tightly around home plate, mixed it with hard clay and left the infield unwatered. Speedy Orioles players like McGraw, Joe Kelley, Steve Brodie, and Willie Keeler most often practiced and perfected it.

In modern baseball, the Baltimore chop is much less common, usually resulting when a batter accidentally swings over the ball. The result is sometimes more pronounced on those diamonds with artificial turf. The technique still sees use in softball.

=== banana stalk ===
A bat made with an inferior, low-quality grade of wood. See also #morning journal

=== bandbox ===
A ballpark with small dimensions that encourages offense, especially home runs. A crackerbox. (see: Baker Bowl and Citizens Bank Ballpark)

=== bang ===
- Cancelling a game because of bad weather: "I thought we were gonna get banged but we got in five innings."
- To hit the ball hard, especially to hit a homer. "Utley banged the game-tying home run."
- Players who are banged up are injured, though may continue to play. Example: "Banged up Braves ready for playoff rematch with Astros."
- A bang-up game is an exciting or close game. Example from a sports headline: "A Real Bang-Up Finish."
- A bang bang play is one in which the runner is barely thrown out, a very close call, typically at first base. Perhaps reflecting the "bang" of the ball in the first-baseman's glove followed immediately by the "bang" of the baserunner's foot hitting the bag.
- bang it inside is when a pitcher throws on the inside of the plate, and the batter cannot get his arms extended enough to hit the ball, which goes "bang" into the catcher's mitt. "It was an unbelievable feeling and a feeling I'll never forget," Giavotella said. "Scherzer was trying to come in on me all day. He was banging me inside and I couldn't get my hands extended. I guess he missed over the plate that time and I got my hands inside and barreled it up and it flew out of the park."

=== banjo hitter ===
A batter who lacks power. A banjo hitter usually hits bloop singles, often just past the infield dirt, and would have a low slugging percentage. The name is said to come from the twanging sound of the bat at contact, like that of a banjo. See also Punch and Judy hitter.

=== barehand it ===
Refers to when a fielder catches a ball with the hand not covered by his glove.

=== barrel ===
An advanced metric that measures the times a batter hits the ball at certain launch angles with certain exit velocities. Barrels are more likely to produce hits, particularly extra-base hits, than non-barrels.

=== barrel up ===
In modern baseball, refers to hitting a pitch hard with the sweet spot of the baseball bat.
See sweet spot.

=== base hit ===
See hit.

=== base knock ===
A single. Also see knocks.

=== Baseball Annie ===
- Female "groupie" known to "be easy" for baseball players. Susan Sarandon played such a role as the character Annie Savoy in the 1988 American film "Bull Durham".
- Infamous Ruth Ann Steinhagen was the first "Baseball Annie". She became obsessed with Cubs and then Phillies first baseman Eddie Waitkus. She shot him through the chest, nearly killing him in 1949. This story inspired the 1952 novel The Natural.

=== bases loaded ===
Runners on first, second, and third bases. Also known as "bases full", "bases packed", "bases jammed", "bases juiced", "bases chucked", or "bases drunk". This presents a great scoring opportunity for the batting team, but it also presents an easy double play opportunity for the defense. Causing the bases to become loaded is called loading the bases. A batter is often intentionally walked when there are runners on 2nd and 3rd base to make it easier for the defense to record more than one out.
A bases-loaded situation is the only time there is a force at home plate.
Since there is no additional room to place the batter, should he be awarded first base from a base on balls or hit by pitch, one run will score due to the third-base player's being forced home. Chronologically, only big leaguers Abner Dalrymple, Nap Lajoie, Mel Ott, Bill Nicholson, Barry Bonds, Josh Hamilton, and Corey Seager hold the distinction of being intentionally walked with the bases loaded.
When a home run is hit with the bases loaded, it is called a grand slam. It scores four runs, which is the most runs that can be scored on a single play.

=== basement ===
Last place, bottom of the standings. Also cellar.

=== baserunner ===
A baserunner (shortened as "runner") is a player on the offensive team (i.e., the team at bat) who has safely reached base.

=== basket catch ===
Catching a fly ball with the glove situated about the waistline, as opposed to the hands being situated above the shoulders.

=== bat ===
- A baseball bat is a smooth contoured round wooden or metal rod used to hit the ball thrown by the pitcher. A bat's diameter is larger at one end (the barrel-end) than at the other (the handle). The bottom end of the handle is the knob. A batter generally tries to strike the ball in the sweet spot near the middle of the barrel-end of the bat, sometimes referred to as the fat part of the bat or the meat end of the bat.
- The player who uses it to strike the ball—a batter, hitter, or batsman—can be said to bat the ball.
- A player known as a good hitter might be said to have a good bat. Headline: "Shortstop mixes golden glove with solid bat." A player who is adept at both hitting and fielding might be said to have a good bat and good glove. The headline "Wesleyan shortstop Winn has bat and glove" does not mean Winn owns a bat and a glove, it means he is very skilled at both hitting and fielding.
- A team with many good hitters might be said to have a lot of "bats" (referring to the players not the instrument). "It's an awesome thing when we all get going like that," Murphy said. "We've got so many bats in our lineup that we're hard to beat if we keep hitting."

=== bat around ===
According to The Dickson Baseball Dictionary, a team has "batted around" when each of the nine batters in the team's lineup has made a plate appearance, and the first batter is coming up again during a single inning. Dictionary.com, however, defines "bat around" as "to have every player in the lineup take a turn at bat during a single inning". It is not an official statistic. Opinions differ as to whether nine batters must get an at-bat, or if the opening batter must bat again for "batting around" to have occurred.

=== bat drop ===
A physical property of a bat, expressed as a (usually) negative number equal to the bat's weight in ounces minus its length in inches. For example, a bat that is 34 inches (86 cm) long and weighs 31 ounces (880 g) has a bat drop of –3. In general, bats with a larger bat drop (i.e., lighter) are easier to swing, and bats with a smaller bat drop (i.e., heavier) can produce faster ball velocity, though these results depend on the batter's ability.

=== bat flip ===
A celebration in which a batter who just hit a home run flips/tosses the bat in a dramatic way, rather than simply dropping it as they start running. The practice is controversial - some players such as Tim Anderson and Jose Bautista have been subject to retaliation by the opposing team when they bat flipped after a home run against them.

=== bat the ball ===
To hit the ball with the bat – whether into fair territory or foul.

=== batter ===
The player who is at bat and tries to hit the ball with the bat. Also referred to as the "hitter" or "batsman".

=== batter-runner ===
When a batter hits a fair ball not caught by a fielder, he becomes the batter-runner. The batter-runner is forced to advance to first base, and may be put out by being tagged by the ball securely held by a fielder (or by the fielder's glove, provided he has secure possession of the ball in the glove), or by a fielder with secure possession of the ball touching first base before the batter-runner touches it. If there are other runners on base, they may also be forced to advance because the batter has become a runner. This is called a force play.

=== batter's eye ===
A solid-colored, usually dark area beyond the center field wall that is the visual backdrop for the batter looking out at the pitcher. It allows the batter to see the pitched ball against a dark and uncluttered background, partly for his safety. It is comparable to the sight screen in cricket. The use of a batter's eye has been standard in baseball since at least the late 1800s.

One example of a batter's eye is the black area in center field of the first Yankee Stadium. At one time there were seats in that section, but because of distractions the seats were removed and the area was painted black.

=== batter's box ===
A rectangle on either side of home plate in which the batter must be standing for fair play to resume. A foot and a hand out of the box are not sufficient to stop play (although pitchers will usually respect a batter's wish to step out of the box). The umpire must grant the batter a timeout before play is stopped.

=== battery ===
The pitcher and catcher considered as a single unit, who may also be called batterymen or batterymates of one another. The use of this word was first coined by Henry Chadwick in the 1860s in reference to the firepower of a team's pitching staff and inspired by the artillery batteries then in use in the American Civil War. Later, the term evolved to indicate the combined effectiveness of pitcher and catcher.

=== battery mates ===
A pitcher and catcher from the same team. See "battery".

=== batting average ===
Batting average (BA) is the average number of hits per at-bat (BA=H/AB). A perfect batting average would be 1.000 (read: "one thousand"). A batting average of .300 ("three hundred") is considered to be excellent, which means the best hitters fail to get a hit in 70% of their at-bats. Even the level of .400, which is outstanding and rare (last achieved at the major league level in 1941), suggests "failure" 60% of the time. Bases on balls are not counted in calculating batting average. This is part of the reason OBP is now regarded by "figger filberts" as a truer measure of a hitter's worth at the plate. In 1887, there was an experiment with including bases-on-balls as hits (and as at-bats) in computing the batting average. It was effectively an early attempt at an OBP, but it was regarded as a "marketing gimmick" and was dropped after the one year. It eventually put Cap Anson in limbo regarding his career hits status; dropping the bases on balls from his 1887 stats, as some encyclopedias do, put his career number of hits below the benchmark 3,000 total.

=== batting practice ===
The period, often before a game, when players warm up or practice their hitting technique. Sometimes refers to a period within a game when one team's hitters have so totally dominated a given pitcher that the game resembles a batting practice session. Referred to colloquially as well as abbreviated as BP.

=== battle ===
When a hitter works the count, by being patient, perhaps by deliberately fouling off pitches that he can't get good wood on, he's said to be "battling".

=== bazooka ===
A strong throwing arm. A gun, a cannon, a rifle.

=== BB ===
- A line drive hit so hard that a fielder has trouble catching up to it. The reference is to being shot from a BB gun.
- "BB" is scorer's shorthand for a walk, otherwise known as a "base on balls". Walks are recorded under the "BB" column of a box score.

=== BBCOR ===
An initialism for Batted-Ball Coefficient of Restitution, a standard that all non-wooden bats (both metal and composite) must meet in order to be approved for use in most amateur baseball leagues, such as U.S. college baseball.

=== bean ===
A pitch intentionally thrown to hit the batter if he does not move out of the way, especially when directed at the head (or the "bean" in old-fashioned slang). The word bean can also be used as a verb, as in the following headline: "Piazza says Clemens Purposely Beaned Him."

=== beat out ===
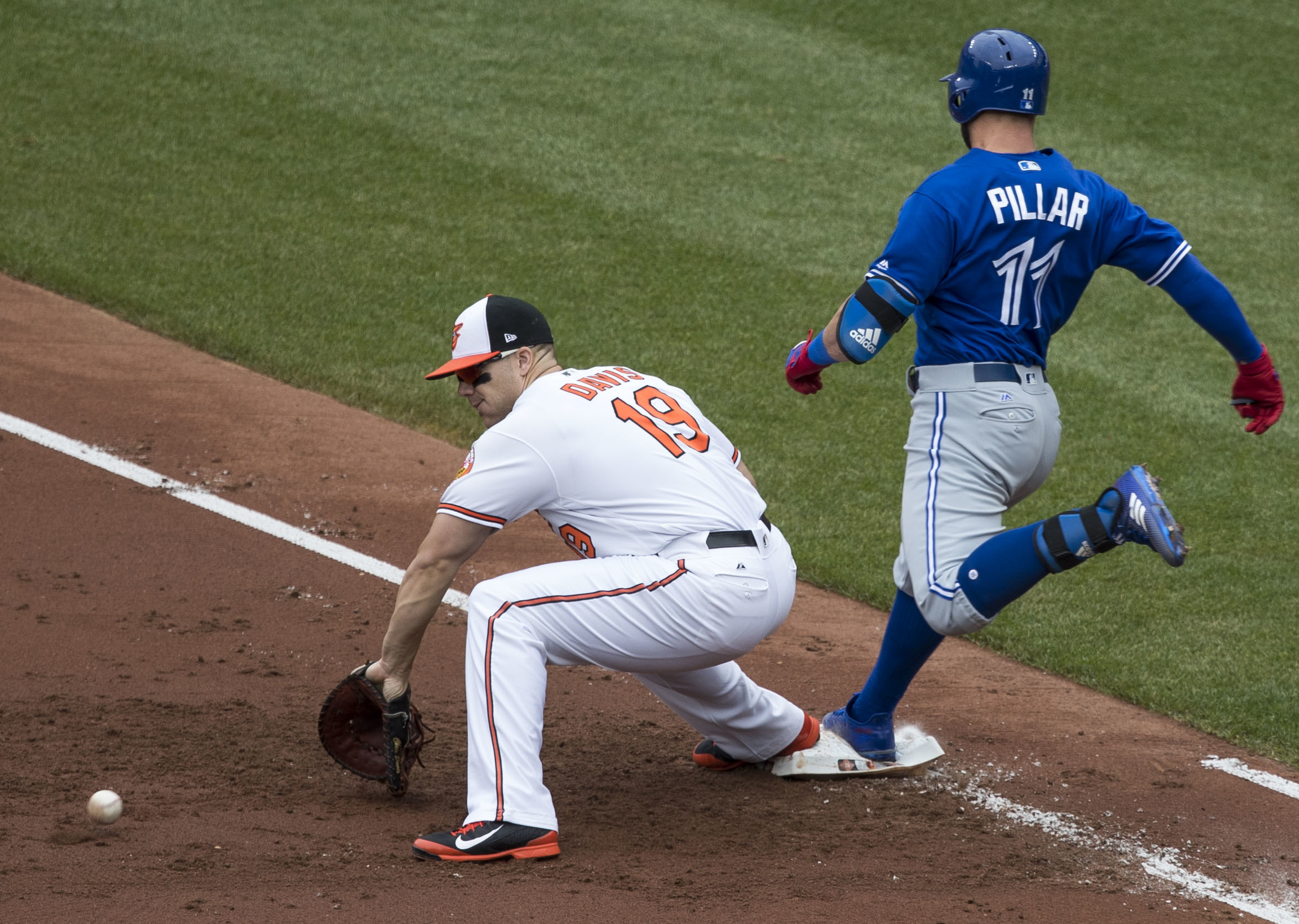
Kevin Pillar (right) beats out a throw to first base.

When a runner gets to first base before the throw, he beats the throw or beats it out. Akin to leg out. "Trea Turner puts on the burners to beat out the throw to first to add another run."

=== beat the rap ===
Occurs when a batter hits the ball on the ground with a runner on first and fewer than two outs. If the play has the potential of being a double play, the batter can beat the rap if he reaches first base before the throw from the fielder who recorded the putout at second base. The result of the play becomes a fielder's choice.

=== behind in the count ===
Opposite of ahead in the count. For the batter: when the count contains more strikes than balls. For the pitcher: vice versa.

If the pitcher is behind in the count, he is in increasing danger of walking the batter. If the batter is behind, he is in increasing danger of striking out. "While he allowed only three hits, he walked five and pitched from behind in the count."

=== belt ===
- To hit a ball hard to the outfield or out of the park, fair or foul. "Jones belts that one deep to left ... but just foul."
- The actual belt worn by a player as part of the uniform, usually mentioned in reference to the location of a pitch or a ball in play. "Benard takes a fastball, outside corner at the belt, called a strike", or "Grounded sharply into the hole at short--ranging to his right, Aurilia fields the belt-high hop and fires on to first; two away."

=== bench ===
- "The bench" is where the players sit in the dugout when they are not at bat, in the on-deck circle, or in the field.
- "The bench" may also refer to the players who are not in the line-up but are still eligible to enter the game. "LaRussa's bench is depleted because of all the pinch hitting and pinch running duties it's been called on to perform tonight."

=== bench jockey ===
A player, coach or manager with the talent of annoying and distracting opposition players and umpires from his team's dugout with verbal repartee. Especially useful against those with rabbit ears. The verbal jousting is frequently called "riding"; hence the "rider" from the dugout becomes a "bench jockey". Riding opposition players enough to unnerve them but not enough to enrage them and provoke a fight is believed to be fast-fading in the 21st-century game. Major League Baseball players on the injured list are permitted to be on the bench but they are not permitted to engage in bench jockeying.

=== bender ===
A curveball.

=== big as a grapefruit ===
When a hitter sees the pitch so well that it appears to be larger than its actual size, he may describe the ball as being "as big as a grapefruit". "After hitting a 565-foot home run, Mickey Mantle once said, 'I just saw the ball as big as a grapefruit'. During a slump, Joe 'Ducky' Medwick of the St. Louis Cardinals said he was 'swinging at aspirins'."

=== big fly ===
A home run.

=== big inning ===
The opposite mentality of small ball, if a team is thinking "big inning" they are focusing on scoring runs strictly through base hits and home runs, as opposed to bunts or other sacrifices. More generically, a "big inning" is an inning in which the offense scores a large number of runs, usually four or more.

=== big league ===
See major league

=== big swing ===
A swing of the bat that produces a home run. "Pinch runner Hernán Pérez came in for Martinez and Perez walked Dirks, setting the stage for Avila's big swing."

=== bigs ===
See major leagues

=== bingle ===
A single. A base hit that ends up with the hitter on first base. "Brown tried to stretch the bingle into a double, and was out, Monte Irvin to Frank Austin." (A rare usage nowadays.)

=== blast ===
A home run, normally one that is well hit.

=== bleachers ===
Bleacher seats (in short, bleachers) are uncovered seats that are typically tiered benches or other inexpensive seats located in the outfield or in any area past the main grandstand. The term comes from the assumption that the benches are sun-bleached. "Bleachers" is short for the term originally used, "bleaching boards". Fans in the bleacher seats are sometimes called bleacher bums or bleacher creatures.

=== bleeder ===
A weakly hit ground ball that goes for a base hit. A scratch hit. "Dunn walked to bring up Morra, who jumped on the first pitch he saw and hit a bleeder that didn't leave the infield, driving in Gradwohl."

=== blistered ===
A ball that is hit so hard that it seems to generate its own heat may be said to have been blistered. "Chapman then blistered a ball toward left-center, and Knoblauch raced back, moving smoothly, and made the catch with his arm outstretched."

=== block the plate ===
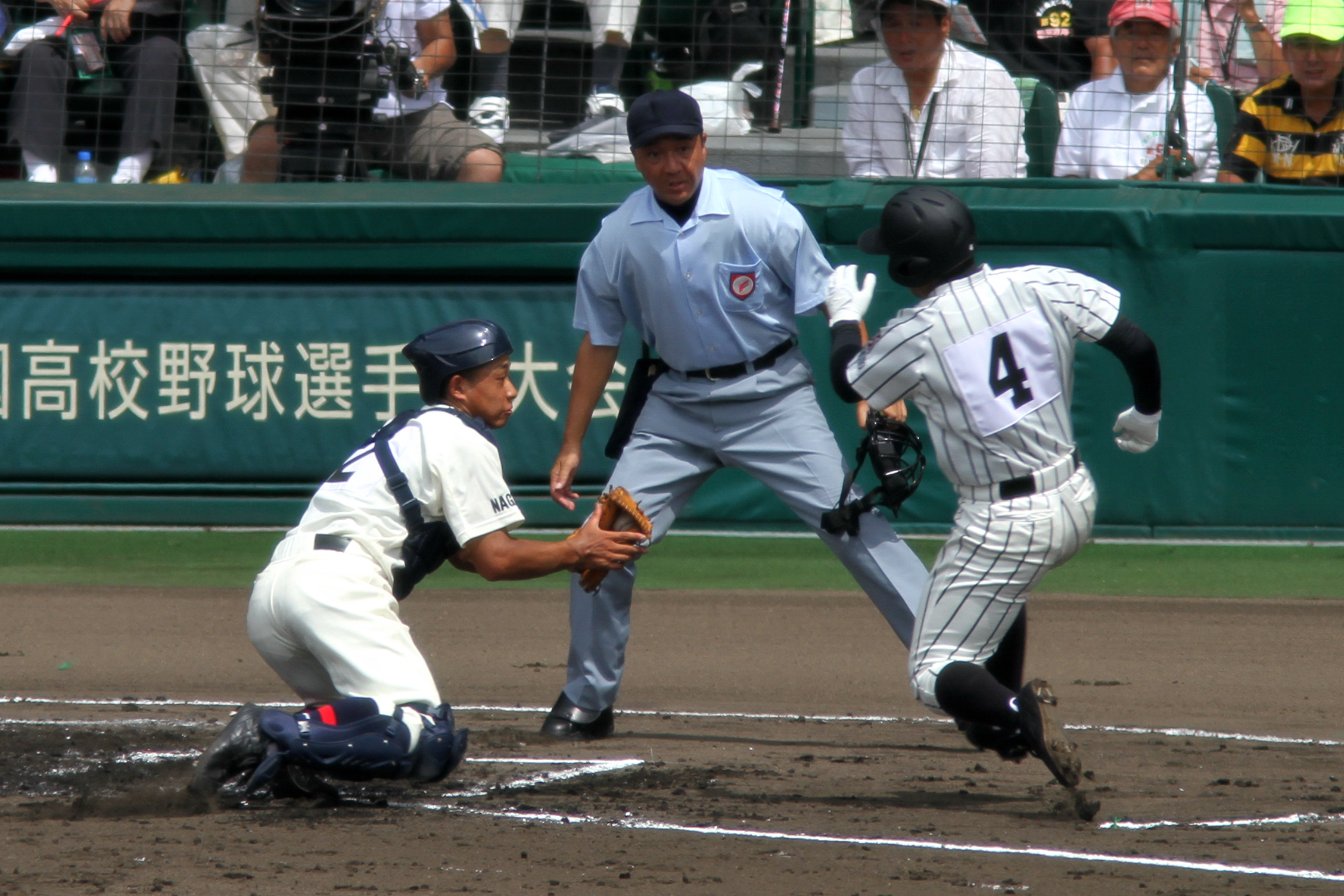
A catcher (left) drops to both knees to block the plate from an opposing baserunner during a Japanese high school baseball game

A catcher who puts a foot, leg, or whole body between home plate and a runner attempting to score, is said to "block the plate". Blocking the plate is a dangerous tactic, and may be considered obstruction (Official Rules of Baseball, Rule 2.00 (Obstruction)).

=== bloop curve ===
An Eephus pitch (q.v.); a trick pitch thrown like a slow-pitch softball pitch, with a high arcing trajectory and very little velocity (ca. 40-55 mph or less). Specifically, such a pitch thrown ostensibly as a curveball.

=== blooper ===
- A blooper or bloop is a weakly hit fly ball that drops in for a single between an infielder and an outfielder. Also known as a "bloop single", a dying quail, or a duck snort.
- A fielding error. Headline: "Red Sox roll White Sox after Contreras blooper".
- An odd or funny play, such as when a pitcher throws the ball to the catcher after the batter has stepped out of the batter's box and timeout has been called -- perhaps hitting the catcher in the head with the pitch.

=== blow ===
- To blow a game is to lose it after having the lead. "We had the game in hand and we blew it."
- To blow a pitch ("by" a batter) is to throw one so fast the batter is unable to keep up (with it).
- To blow a save is to lose a lead or the game after coming into the game in a "save situation". This has a technical meaning in baseball statistics.
- A hit, typically a home run: "Ortiz's Blow Seals Win."

=== blow open ===
To gain a commanding lead in a game, perhaps after the game has been very competitive or the score has remained tied or close. "Pirates Score Late To Blow Open Close Game Against Stony Brook."

=== blown save ===
A blown save (BS) is charged to a relief pitcher who enters a game in a save situation but allows the tying run to score. If the pitcher further allows the winning run to score, he is charged with both a loss and a blown save. If, after blowing the save, the pitcher's team regains the lead, the pitcher may also be credited with the win. The blown save is not an officially recognized statistic by Major League Baseball, but is recognized by the Rolaids Relief Man Award, which charges two points against a reliever's record for a blown save opportunity. It is often used on broadcasts to characterize the "record" of closers analogous to win–loss records of starters. "Jones has made 31 out of 34 saves" or "Jones has 31 saves and three blown saves."

=== blowser ===
Rhymes with "closer". A closer who seems to get more blown saves than saves.

=== blue ===
- An umpire, referring to the traditional blue color of the umpire's shirt.
- Sometimes used derisively, such as when complaining about a ruling, e.g.: "Oh, come on, Blue!" However, it is also used as a neutral and informal term (particularly at lower levels) if the umpire is not acquainted with the teams, or they either do not know or do not remember the umpire's name, e.g.: "Hey Blue, can I have time?"

=== bomb ===
A home run.

=== boner ===
A boner is a mental mistake that changes the course of a game dramatically.

=== bonus baby ===
A young player who received a signing bonus.

=== bonus baseball ===
Extra innings. Most famously used by San Diego Padres (and former Boston Red Sox) announcer Don Orsillo. Also called "bonus cantos" by Yankees announcer Michael Kay.

=== booted ===
Made an error, kicked it – typically referring to a misplay on a ground ball: "With the Cubs still up 3-1, shortstop Alex Gonzalez booted a sure out, an error that made five of the eight runs that Florida scored in the inning unearned."

=== bottom of the inning ===
The second half or "last half" of an inning, during which the home team bats, derived from its position in the line score. Can also be informally shortened to "bot" (e.g.: "It's bot nine, a close game..").

=== bottom dropped out of it ===
Sometimes said of a sinker or drop ball, implying that a pitch suddenly moved downward as if through a trap door. Ideally, the pitcher throws with the same familiar arm speed and release point only to have the "bottom drop out" at the last instant, leaving the batter wondering what happened.

=== box ===
- The vicinity of the pitcher's mound. Baseball announcers will sometimes refer to a batted ball going back through the pitcher's mound area as having gone through the box, or a pitcher being removed from the game will be said to have been knocked out of the box. In the early days of the game, there was no mound; the pitcher was required to release the ball while inside a box drawn on the ground. Even though the mound has replaced the box, this terminology still exists.
- Also, the batter's box, the area within which the batter stands when hitting. The batter must be in the box for the pitcher to pitch.

=== box score ===
Statistical summary of a game. The line score is an abbreviated version of the box score, duplicated from the field scoreboard. Invention of the box score is credited to Henry Chadwick.

=== BP ===
- batting practice.
- Devotees of baseball research also sometimes refer to Baseball Prospectus as BP.

=== BR ===
Bats right; used in describing a player's statistics, for example: John Doe (TR, BR, 6', 172 lbs.)

=== brand new ball game ===
When a team scores run(s) that bring the score up to a tie, it is said to be "a brand new ball game". The phrase was popularized by Hall of Fame Dodgers broadcaster Vin Scully.

=== breaking ball ===
Any pitch that markedly deviates from a "straight" or expected path due to a spin used by the pitcher to achieve the desired effect. Some examples are the curveball, the slider and the screwball.

=== break one off ===
To throw a curveball.

=== break open the game ===
When a team gains a multiple-run lead, perhaps in a single rally that expands their lead, the game may be said to be "broken open". "The Padres broke the game open with five runs in the fifth, thanks to three errors by the Cubs, who have dropped 12 of 14."

=== bring ===
To pitch; often used for a fastball: bring the gas, bring the heat, bring it.

=== broken-bat ===
An adjective referring to a play that originates with a batter's breaking his bat upon making contact with the ball.

=== Bronx Bombers ===
A nickname given to the New York Yankees due to their stadium's location in the Bronx and their legacy of home-run hitters in a hitter-friendly ballpark.

=== bronx cheer ===
A sarcastic cheer from the crowd; blowing a raspberry.

=== browsing ===
A batter who strikes out looking, especially if the batter did not move his bat at all. This term is mainly used by sports commentators. Synonymous with window shopping.

=== brushback ===
A pitch intentionally thrown close to a batter to intimidate him, i.e., to "brush him back" from the plate. Also a purpose pitch or chin music. Archaic usage: "a blowdown".

=== buck and change ===
A player batting between .100 and .199 is said to be batting "a buck and change" or, more specifically, the equivalent average in dollars (bucks) and cents (change). Example: A batter batting .190 is said to be batting "a buck ninety". Major league position players with a batting average this low will very likely be demoted down to AAA for seasoning or even released outright. See also Mendoza line.

=== bug on the rug ===
Phrase coined by Pittsburgh Pirates announcer Bob Prince in the 1970s. A basehit that skittered through the gap, particularly on artificial turf.

=== Bugs Bunny change-up ===
A change-up pitch that appears to arrive at home plate so slowly that a batter can make three swings and misses on a single pitch. Whiff-whiff-whiff, three strikes and the batter is out. The reference is to Bugs Bunny, the animated cartoon character, who is depicted employing such a pitch in the cartoon Baseball Bugs. As Trevor Hoffman's changeup evolved into an all-world weapon, his pitching teammates were in awe of it, much like many hitters were. They liked it so much, they gave it a nickname. They called it the Bugs Bunny Pitch. 'You could swing at it three times and it still wouldn't be in the mitt', Andy Ashby said, bringing up the image of the famous cartoon. 'I swear, he could tell them it's coming and they still couldn't hit it.'

=== bullpen ===
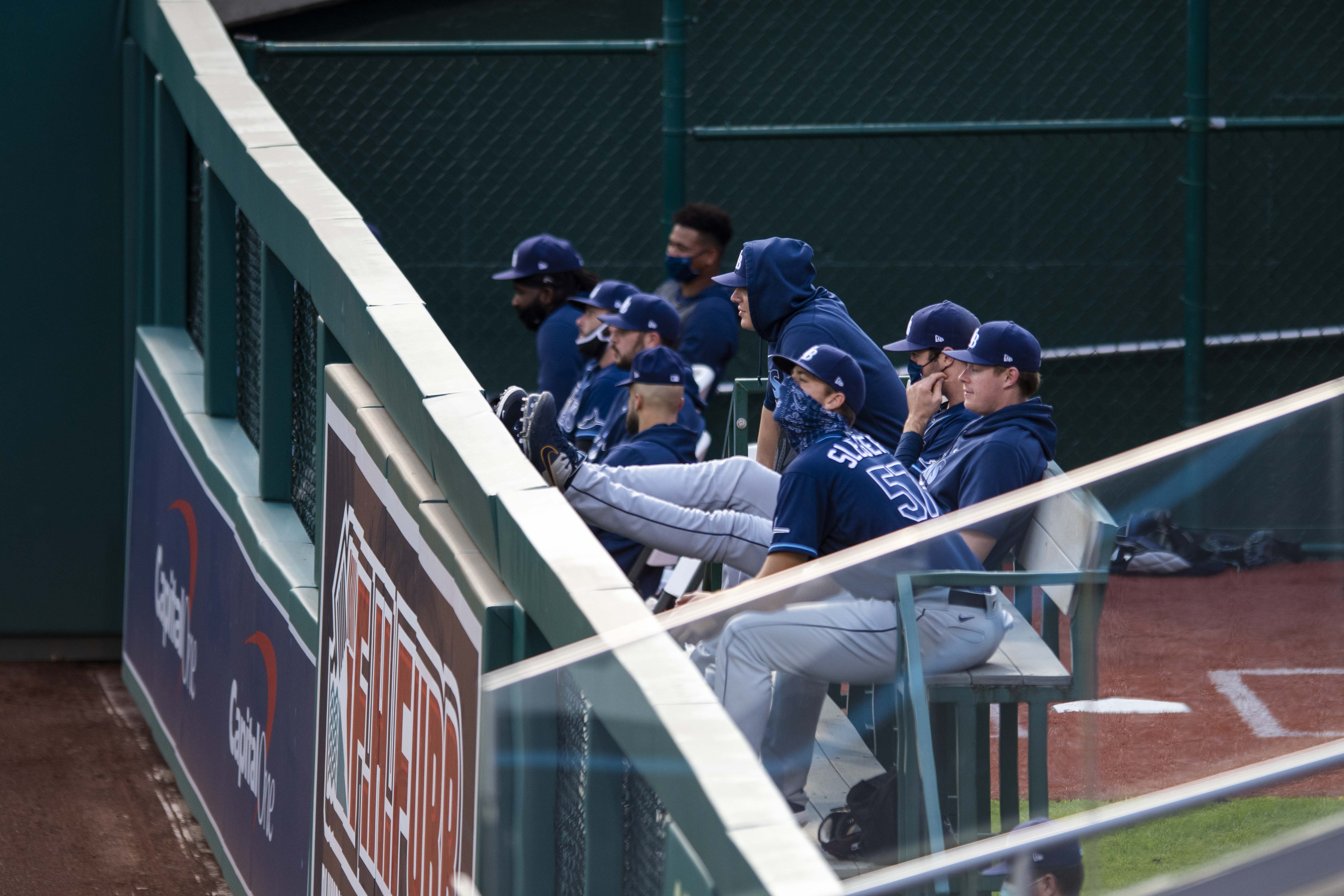
"Bullpen" can be used to describe the area in which these Tampa Bay Rays relief pitchers are sitting or as a metonym for the pitchers themselves.

- The area used by pitchers and catchers to warm up before taking the mound when play has already begun. This area is usually off to the side along either the left or right base line, or behind an outfield fence. It is almost never in fair territory, presumably due to the risk of interference with live action. A rare exception was at New York's Polo Grounds where the bullpens were in the deep left and right center field quarter-circles of the outfield wall.
- A team's relief pitching corps (so named because the relievers are in the bullpen during games).

There are varying theories of the origin of the term, discussed in more detail in the main article.

=== bullpen by committee ===
A strategy by which a club does not assign relief pitchers to specific roles such as "closer", "set-up", or "long relief", and instead may use any reliever at any given time. At the major league level, this strategy is commonly used when the club's closer is unavailable.

=== bullpen game ===
A game in which a club employs relief pitchers throughout rather than using one of their starters.

=== bullpen session ===
A regular activity for starting pitchers during a season.

=== bullpenning ===
An infrequently used strategy that involves using a string of relief pitchers (some of whom, in this strategy, may be pitchers more often used as starters) in stints of no more than two innings instead of relying on one pitcher to work most of the innings.

=== bump ===
The pitchers mound. "Who's on the bump today?"

=== bunt ===
- To deliberately bat the ball weakly to a particular spot on the infield by holding the bat nearly still, with one hand behind the sweet spot (q.v. under bat) and letting the ball hit it. Typically, a bunt is used to advance other runners and is then referred to as a sacrifice or a sacrifice hit or a sacrifice bunt. When done correctly, fielders have no play except, at best, to throw the batter-runner out at first base.
- Speedy runners also bunt for base hits when infielders are playing back. In such a situation, left-handed hitters may use a drag bunt, in which they start stepping towards first base while completing the bunt swing. Even the great slugger Mickey Mantle would drag bunt once in a while, taking advantage of his 3.1 second speed from home to first base. Currently, Ryan Zimmerman of the Nationals is notable in that he is a right-handed hitter who uses drag bunts successfully.

=== bush league ===
A slang term for play that is of minor league or unprofessional quality. The "bushes" or the "sticks" are small towns where minor league teams may operate. A "busher" refers to someone from the "bush leagues": see subtitle of Ring Lardner's first book, You Know Me Al: A Busher's Letters.

=== businessman's special ===
A day game on a weekday.

=== bust him in ===
To throw a fastball in on the hitter's hands. Also: tie him up, in the kitchen.

=== butcher ===
A very poor fielder.

=== butcher boy ===
A strategy where the hitter first shows he intends to bunt, pulls back the bat when the pitcher begins the delivery, and takes a quick swing at the pitch. Generally used by weaker hitters such as pitchers. Greg Maddux was known for employing this tactic effectively in the early part of his career with the Chicago Cubs and Atlanta Braves.

=== buzz the tower ===
To throw a high fastball up-and-in to a hitter, typically with intent to back the hitter off the plate or make a statement. Also see brushback and purpose pitch.

== C ==
=== Cactus League ===
The group of teams that conduct their pre-season spring training exhibition games in Arizona where the cactus grows in abundance. See also Grapefruit League.

=== caddy ===
A caddy's sole function is to come in as a substitute in the late innings of a lopsided game to act as a defensive replacement for an aging power hitter or to pinch run.

=== call-up ===
A Major League team may call up or promote a player from the minor leagues during the season to take a spot on its roster, often to replace a player who has been sent down to the minor leagues or else placed on the disabled list. Players who have been in the major leagues previously (and were sent down) may be said to be recalled rather than called up. After August 31, several minor leaguers may be called up to take a spot on the expanded roster.

=== cannon ===
- A strong arm. Also, a gun.
- To throw strongly. Announcer following a play in which the shortstop fields a ground ball and throws hard to first: "Guillen cannons and gets him."

=== can of corn ===
A high, easy-to-catch, fly ball hit to the outfield. The phrase is said to have originated in the nineteenth century and relates to an old-time grocer's method of getting canned goods down from a high shelf. Using a stick with a hook on the end, a grocer could tip a can so it would fall for an easy catch into his apron. One theory for use of corn as the canned good in the phrase is that a can of corn was considered the easiest "catch" as corn was the best-selling vegetable in the store and so was heavily stocked on the lowest shelves. Another theory is that the corn refers to the practice in the very early days of baseball of calling the outfield the "corn field", especially in early amateur baseball where the outfield may have been a farm field. Frequently used by Red Barber, a variation, 'A #8 CAN OF GOLDEN BANTAM' was favored by Bob Prince, Pittsburgh Pirates' announcer. The phrase was also used by Yankee announcer Phil Rizzuto, Red Sox and then White Sox broadcaster Ken "The Hawk" Harrelson, and Blue Jays broadcaster and former manager Buck Martinez as voiced in the popular video game Triple Play 2000. Also, a phrase used to refer to something that is not challenging. Informally, can of corn may be used as a phrase to describe mild excitement, personal acknowledgement or recognition of significance.

=== Captain Hook ===
A manager who often takes a pitcher out of the game at the first sign of trouble. Sparky Anderson was perhaps the best example of a "Captain Hook" at the major league level. See hook.

=== carve up ===
When a pitcher quickly dispatches a batter with three or four pitches that the batter only whiffs at, the pitcher may be said to have "carved up the batter" – like a chef carving up a turkey. Headline: "How Buehrle carved up Tampa Bay with just one 90-m.p.h. pitch."

=== cash in ===
To knock in a runner who is already on base. "Lauren Rorebeck then cashed both runners in with a home run over the left field fence to tie the game at 7–7 with two innings to play."

=== catbird seat ===
A desirable or auspicious situation. Popularized by Red Barber, longtime broadcaster for the Brooklyn Dodgers. James Thurber wrote in his short story of the same title: "[S]itting in the catbird seat" means sitting pretty, like a batter with three balls and no strikes on him. The catbird is said to seek out the highest point in a tree to sing his song, so someone in the catbird seat is high up.

=== catch up to a fastball ===
As if a batter were running a footrace with a fastball, he's said to "catch up" to a fastball if his reaction time and bat speed are quick enough to hit a fastball by a power pitcher. "Our scouting reports indicate he can still hit and still catch up to a fastball. As long as he can catch up to a fastball, he's going to get the money."

=== catcher's interference ===
It is catcher's interference when the catcher physically hinders the batter's opportunity to swing at a pitch. In professional baseball, play continues and after continuous playing action ceases, the umpire calls time. The penalty is that the batter is awarded first base; any runner attempting to steal is awarded that base and all other runners advance only if forced. The manager of the offensive team has the option of keeping the result of the play. He will not be given the option by the umpires and must explicitly declare it before the play continues after awarding bases. The catcher is charged with an error. This is one of many types of interference call.

=== caught looking ===
A term used when the third strike is called on a batter without the batter attempting to swing at the pitch.

=== caught napping ===
A baserunner who is tagged out because he wasn't paying attention to what the defensive players were doing is "caught napping". Often this involves a pickoff play in which the infielder sneaks up behind the runner and takes a throw from the pitcher or, less often, the catcher.

=== cellar ===
Last place, bottom of the standings. A team that spends too much time in last place, especially over a stretch of years, tends to acquire the unflattering title of cellar dweller. SYNONYM: basement.

=== cement mixer ===
A baseball pitched with the intent to break out of the strike zone that fails to break and ends up hanging in the strike zone; an unintentional slow fastball with side spin resembling a fixed-axis spinning cement mixer. Cement mixer spin doesn't translate into lateral or vertical motion, resulting in a straight and easily-hit pitch.

=== center cut ===
From bronxpinstripes.com: A butcher's term for the best cut of beef. In baseball lingo, it is a fastball down the middle.

=== the chair ===
Specifically regarding a batter: A seat on the bench, as opposed to reaching base or remaining in the batter's box. As in, "throw him the chair". The expression is an encouragement to the pitcher to strike out the batter, sending him back to the dugout, thus "throwing him the chair"—forcing him to sit down.

=== challenge the hitter ===
When a pitcher is aggressive and throws strikes, perhaps his best fastball, he may be said to "challenge the hitter". Akin to pounding the strike zone or attacking the strike zone. "Jared has outstanding stuff", Mee said. "The one thing I would like to see him do is throw more strikes and challenge the hitters. He has a lot of ability and when he is ahead in the count he's a very difficult guy to hit off of."

=== change the eye level ===
A pitcher "changes the eye level" of a hitter by throwing pitches at different heights in the strike zone. This is intended to keep the hitter off-balance or uncomfortable. "Changing the eye-level of a hitter is important because as you advance, it'll become more difficult for you to get a hitter to move his feet in the batters box – even by pitching inside – so the next option is to move the hitter's eyes."

=== changeup ===
A changeup or a change is a pitch meant to look like a fastball - but with less velocity - short for change of pace. A variety of this pitch is the circle change, where a circle is formed using the thumb and index finger on the last third of a ball. This causes the ball to break inside and down to right-handed batter from a right-handed pitcher, frequently resulting in ground balls. Also, a straight change - made famous by Pedro Martínez - can be utilized. The grip requires all fingers to be used in holding the ball, resulting in more friction, thus slowing the ball down tremendously.

=== charge ===
- When an infielder runs towards a ground ball rather than wait for it to come to him.
- Runs are said to be "charged" to the pitcher who initially allowed the scoring runner to get on base.

=== charging the mound ===
Charging the mound refers to a batter assaulting the pitcher after being hit by a pitch or in some cases after narrowly avoiding being hit. The first incident of a professional charging the mound has not been identified but the practice certainly dates back to the game's early days. Charging the mound is often the precipitating cause of a bench-clearing brawl and will most likely result in the batter's ejection.

=== chase ===
- To chase (or chase after) is to swing at a pitch well outside of the strike zone.
- A pitcher who is removed from the game by the manager because he gave up too many runs is said to have been "chased from the game" or "chased from the mound" by the opposing batters. "Pettitte was chased from the game in the seventh inning following an RBI single by Willy Taveras and a two-RBI triple by Kazuo Matsui."
- A player or coach who is ejected from the game by an umpire can be said to be chased. "Martin was tossed by umpire Lee Weyer in the fourth game of the 1976 Series, seven years after Weaver was chased by Shag Crawford in the fourth game in 1969."

=== chatter ===
To verbally challenge or taunt to distract the opposing batter. Fans and players alike participate in chatter. "Heybattabattabatta" is an example of common baseball chatter.

=== Chavez Ravine ===
Nickname for Dodger Stadium. The ballpark was built in the late 1950s in a former residential neighborhood named Chavez Ravine.

=== cheap run ===
A run that comes about from luck or with little effort by the offensive team. Headline: "A Cheap Run for the Rays." Story: "Carl Crawford got lucky with that blooper down the line; wasn't a bad pitch from Jamie Moyer."

=== check the runner ===
When the pitcher or an infielder who fields a ball, looks in the direction of a runner on base and thereby causes him to not take as large of a lead as he would otherwise have taken.

=== checked swing ===
A batter checks a swing by stopping it before the bat crosses the front of home plate. If he fails to stop it in time, the umpire will call a strike because he swung at the pitch. Often the umpire's view of the swing is obstructed. If the umpire calls the pitch a ball, a defensive player such as the catcher or pitcher can ask the home plate umpire to ask another umpire whether the batter swung at the pitch. In such a case, the home plate umpire always accepts the judgment of the other umpire. "Basically, the Tigers tied the Sox in knots the entire game—or else they wouldn't have had as many checked swings as they did. Or as many strikes that they tried to sell to the umpires as balls."

=== cheddar ===
See cheese.

=== cheese ===
A fastball, particularly one that is difficult to hit. A fastball high in the strike zone is also called high cheese, and one low in the zone can be called cheese at the knees. 'Easy Cheese' refers to the seemingly effortless motion of a pitcher as he throws a fastball at very high velocity.

=== chin music ===
A high and tight, up and in pitch meant to knock a batter back from home plate to avoid being hit on the chin. Also known as a brush-back or purpose pitch.

=== Chinese home run ===
- An older term for a home run, often a high fly ball, that barely clears the fence at that part of the outfield closest to the plate. It was frequently used in reference to such hits at the Polo Grounds, former home of the New York Giants, which had notoriously short foul lines. Its use has declined since that stadium was demolished, and even further as it has been perceived as ethnically offensive.
- A secondary sense is that of a long fly ball, usually one that travels backward from home plate. This usage appears to be restricted to sandlot ball games in New England, where it may have evolved from a supposed "Chaney's home run", a backward foul by a player of that name who eventually won a game for the hitting team when the ball, the last one available, could not be found. The umpire then ruled that the other team failed to provide an adequate number of balls and had thus forfeited the game.

=== chinker ===
A blooper; a dying quail; a bleeder.

=== chopper ===
A chopper refers to a batted ball that immediately strikes the hardened area of dirt directly in front of home plate, causing it to bounce high into the infield. Batters who are fast runners can convert such choppers into base hits. Also a batted ball that bounces several times before either being fielded by an infielder or reaching the outfield. Former Braves broadcaster Skip Caray often whimsically called bouncers to third base when Atlanta was on defense as "a chopper to Chipper" in reference to long-time Braves third baseman Chipper Jones.

=== choke up ===
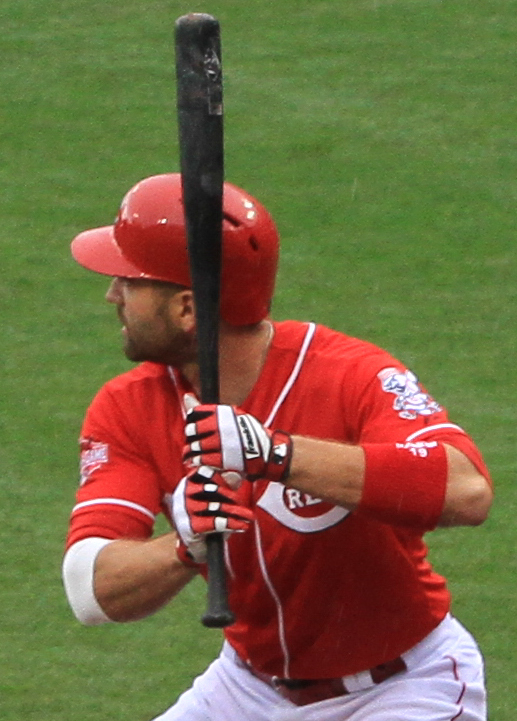
Joey Votto chokes up on the bat during a 2015 game

A batter "chokes up" by sliding his hands up from the knob end of the bat to give him more control over his bat. It reduces the power and increases the control. Prior to driving in the Series-winning hit with a bloop single in the 2001 World Series, Luis Gonzalez choked up on the bat. Thus he came through, and did not "choke" in the clutch.

=== chuck ===
Throw. A pitcher is sometimes referred to as a chucker or someone who can really chuck the ball. In San Francisco, sometimes the fans are referred to as battery chuckers, referring to several incidents where many fans threw batteries onto the field. These incidents date back at least to the early aughts in San Francisco, although there was at least one earlier incident involving Phillies fans.

=== circle ===
The on-deck circle, officially known as the next batter's box.

=== circus catch ===
An outstanding catch, usually when a fielder has to leave his feet or go through contortions to make, resembling a circus acrobat in the process.

=== clean hit ===
When a batter hits a ball through the infield without its being touched by a fielder, he may be said to have a "clean hit". Similarly, if a batter hits a ball over an outfielder's head, he may have a "clean hit". "Tris truly loved to hit and would always get a thrill when getting a 'clean' hit that travelled over an outfielder's head."

=== clean inning ===
When a pitcher allows zero hits, walks or runs and the defense does not commit an error. "I want to see clean innings", Cooper said. "This is a time when we should be seeing them – crisp, clean innings. Yet we're hitting guys [who] are trying to bunt, walking guys on four pitches ... This is not young kids doing this stuff. This is ridiculous. I don't care who it is. It shouldn't be happening. We've got to clean it up. I'd like to see some clean innings sooner or later. We should be throwing strike one, strike two, make some pitches. We're all over the place. We're not even close to the strike zone."

=== cleanup hitter ===
The fourth batter in the lineup, usually a power hitter. The strategy is to get some runners on base for the cleanup hitter to drive home. In theory, if the first three batters of the game were to load the bases, the No. 4 hitter would ideally "clean up" the bases with a grand slam.

=== clear the bases ===
A batter who drives home all the runners on base without scoring himself is said to "clear the bases". "Dikito's base-clearing triple sent the pro-Falcon crowd into a frenzy."

=== climbing the ladder ===
- A tactic where a pitcher delivers a succession of pitches out of the strike zone, each higher than the last, in an attempt to get the batter to swing at a pitch "in his eyes".
- When a fielder makes an unusually high jump to catch a high line drive, as though he climbed an invisible ladder to make the catch

=== clinic ===
A dominant performance by one person or team. "David Price really put on a clinic out there, striking out the side."

=== closer ===
A relief pitcher who is consistently used to "close" or finish a game by getting the final outs. Closers are often among the most overpowering pitchers, and sometimes even the most erratic. Alternatively, they might specialize in a pitch that is difficult to hit, such as the splitter or the cut fastball.

=== close the book ===
One can "close the book" on a pitcher who has been replaced when his statistics for the game become final. If a relief pitcher enters the game with one or more inherited runners, and those runners eventually score, they still affect the statistics of the pitcher who allowed them on base (e.g., earned run average). Once all runners charged to a particular pitcher score or get put out, or the third out is made in the inning, then his statistics can no longer change (except his status as pitcher of record) and his "book" is "closed".

=== clothesline ===
See "throw a clothesline".

=== clubhouse ===
A team's locker room, which may also include eating, entertainment, and workout facilities, especially at the highest professional level. The term "clubhouse" is also frequently used in the sports of golf and thoroughbred horse racing.

=== clutch ===
Good performance under pressure when good performance really matters. May refer to such a situation (being in the clutch) or to a player (a good clutch hitter, or one who "can hit in the clutch"); or to specific hits ("that was a clutch hit"). Most baseball fans believe that clutch hitting exists, but there is significant disagreement among statheads whether clutch hitting is a specific skill or instead just something good hitters in general do. An old synonym for clutch is pinch, as in Christy Mathewson's book, Pitching in a Pinch.

=== cock-shot ===
A belt-high, very hittable fastball, usually down the middle of the plate. As used by Bob McClure, former Red Sox Pitching Coach: "When you throw a cock-shot fastball just above the belt, right down the middle, you're hoping they don't swing. A lot of times, that gets hit out of the ballpark."

=== collar ===
Symbol of going hitless in a game, suggested by its resemblance to a zero, along with the implication of "choking"; to wear the collar: "If Wright doesn't get a hit here, he'll be wearing an 0 for 5 collar on the day." Also, to take the collar: "Cameron Maybin took the collar in his major league debut, striking out twice." Also, Bob Starr (sportscaster) who was a Major League baseball announcer for 25 years (1972-97), restricted his use of the term "wears the collar" only to players who struck out 4 times in a game.

=== comebacker ===
A line drive or ground ball batted directly back to the pitcher.

=== command ===
The advanced skill of a pitcher's ability to throw a pitch where he intends to. Contrast with control, which is just the ability to throw strikes; command is the ability to hit particular spots in or out of the strike zone. Also see location.

=== complete game ===
A complete game (denoted by CG) is the act of a pitcher pitching an entire game himself, without the benefit of a relief pitcher. A complete game can be either a win or a loss. A complete game can be awarded to a pitcher even if he pitches less than (or more than) nine innings, as long as he pitches the entire game.

=== complete game shut out ===
A complete game shut out (CGSO) occurs when a pitcher throws a complete game and does not allow the other team to score.

=== contact hitter ===
A hitter who does not strike out often. Thus, he's usually able to make contact with the ball and put it in play. This doesn't mean he's necessarily a pitty-patty slap hitter. He may hit for power, but typically with more doubles/triples instead of home runs. Pete Rose, Tony Gwynn, and Wade Boggs are all excellent examples of contact hitters.

=== contact pitcher ===
See pitch to contact.

=== contact play ===
When a runner at third base is instructed by a coach to attempt to score as soon as he hears the bat make contact with a pitch, not waiting to learn what kind of contact has been made (fair ball or foul ball, fly ball or ground ball). In such a case, the runner is told to "run on contact". This play would typically occur when the game is close or the bases are loaded. More generally, "Baserunners 'run on contact' when there are two outs, since there is nothing to lose if the ball is caught or the batter is thrown out."

=== control artist ===
A pitcher who gives up very few bases on balls or has excellent command of his pitches. Also known as a control pitcher.

=== cookie ===
A pitch that is easy to hit. Conversely, in the case where the first pitch is a strike and the second pitch is a ball, the second may be the result of a pitcher's missing his spot; the pitcher responds by throwing a cookie to regain control.

=== Cooperstown ===
A metonym for the Hall of Fame, located in Cooperstown, New York. A player or manager "on his way to Cooperstown" is one thought destined for induction into the Hall of Fame.

=== corked bat ===
A bat in which cork (or possibly rubber or some other elastic material) has been inserted into the core of the wooden barrel. Although modifying a bat in this way may help to increase bat speed or control by making the bat lighter, contrary to popular belief it does not impart more energy to the batted ball. A batter could achieve a similar effect by choking up on the bat or using a shorter bat. A player who is caught altering his bat illegally is subject to suspension or other penalties. The last such case in Major League Baseball involved the slugger Sammy Sosa.

=== corners ===
- When runners are "at the corners", they are at first base and third base on the baseball diamond, with no runner on second base.
- The "corners of the plate" are the inside and outside edges of home plate. Some pitchers live on the corners or just nibble on them. Others are skilled at "painting the corners".

=== corner outfielder ===
The left fielder and right fielder are corner outfielders.

=== cornerman ===
A corner infielder, or an infielder who plays third or first base.

=== count ===
The number of balls and strikes a batsman has in his current at-bat. Usually announced as a pair of numbers, for instance "3–0" (pronounced "three and oh"), with the first number being the number of balls and the second being the number of strikes. A 3–2 count – one with the maximum number of balls and strikes in a given at bat – is referred to as a full count. A count of 1–1 or 2–2 is called even, although the pitcher is considered to have the advantage on a 2–2 pitch because he can still throw another ball without consequence, whereas another strike means the batter is out. A batter is said to be ahead in the count (and a pitcher behind in the count) if the count is 1–0, 2–0, 2–1, 3–0, or 3–1. A batter is said to be behind in the count (and a pitcher ahead in the count) if the count is 0–1, 0–2, or 1–2.

=== cousin ===
A pitcher who is easy for a particular batter to hit.

=== covering a base ===
- Part of the infielders' job is to cover bases. That is, stand next to a base in anticipation of receiving the ball from another fielder, then make a play on a baserunner who is approaching that base. On a force play or an appeal play, the fielder covering a base stands with one foot on that base when he catches the ball.
- When a fielder goes to make a play at a base that is not his position (usually because the fielder for that base is unavailable to catch the ball at that base because he is busy fielding the batted ball). A common example is when the first baseman fields a batted ground ball, but is too far from the base to put the runner out. The pitcher runs over to "cover" first base to take the throw from the first baseman (play would be scored as "3-1", meaning first baseman to pitcher).

=== crack of the bat ===
- The sound of the bat hitting the ball. The term is used in baseball to mean "immediately, without hesitation". For example, a baserunner may start running "on the crack of the bat", as opposed to waiting to see where the ball goes.
- Outfielders often use the sound of bat-meeting-ball as a clue to how far a ball has been hit. As physicist Robert Adair has written, "When a baseball is hit straight at an outfielder he cannot quickly judge the angle of ascent and the distance the ball will travel. If he waits until the trajectory is well defined, he has waited too long and will not be able to reach otherwise catchable balls. If he starts quickly, but misjudges the ball such that his first step is wrong (in for a long fly or back for a short fly), the turn-around time sharply reduces his range and he will again miss catchable balls. To help his judgment, the experienced outfielder listens to the sound of the wooden bat hitting the ball. If he hears a 'crack' he runs out, if he hears a 'clunk' he runs in."
- Similarly, with metal bats, the outfielders have to learn to distinguish a "ping" from a "plunk".

=== crackerbox ===
A small baseball field considered to be friendly to power hitters and unfriendly to pitchers. A bandbox. (see: Baker Bowl)

=== crackerjack ===
A player or team with power and exceptional skill.

=== crafty ===
Another term for a control pitcher. Very often used as part of "crafty left-hander", a generic term for control pitchers of that handedness. A right-handed example of a crafty pitcher is Hall of Famer Greg Maddux.

=== crank ===
To hit a ball for extra bases, typically a home run. "Jeter cranked a homer to left to make it 6–5." Also, a turn of the century (19th century) euphemism for baseball spectators, referring to the cranking of the turnstiles as they pass into the ballpark.

=== crash ===
A method of defending against a bunt in which the first and third basemen charge towards the batter to field the ball, the second baseman covers first base, and the shortstop covers second or third, depending on where the lead runner is going. May also refer more generally to the action of any infielder charging towards the batter on a bunt.

=== crooked number ===
A number other than a zero or a one, referring to the appearance of the actual number. A team which is able to score two or more runs in an inning is said to "hang a crooked number" on the scoreboard or on the pitcher(s).

=== creature ===
A home run that is clearly going out as soon as it is hit. It is referred to in this manner because it is disturbing to the pitcher like some type of creature.

=== crossed up ===
- When a catcher calls for the pitcher to throw one type of pitch (e.g., a fastball) but the pitcher throws another (e.g., a curveball), the catcher has been crossed up. This may lead to a passed ball, allowing a runner on base to advance. "Nido and pitcher Keider Montero somehow got crossed up. Montero threw a sinker on the first pitch and Nido was expecting something softer."
- When a batter has been set up to expect a certain type of pitch but instead receives a different one, he may be crossed up, perhaps leading to a weakly hit ball or a swing and a miss.

=== crowd the hitter ===
When a pitcher throws the ball toward the inside part of the plate, he may be trying to "crowd the hitter" by making it difficult for him to extend his arms and get a full swing at the pitch.

=== crowd the plate ===
When a batter sets his stance extremely close to the plate, sometimes covering up part of the strike zone. This angers pitchers and, if done repeatedly, can lead to a brush-back pitch or even a beanball being thrown at the batter to clear the plate. "I am fully aware that when you crowd the plate, you're going to get a high heater."

=== crush the ball ===
- A batter who hits a ball extremely hard and far might be said to crush the ball, as if he had destroyed the baseball or at least changed its shape. Related expressions are crunched the ball or mashed the ball. Indeed, a slugger is sometimes described as a masher. Illustration: "Though the 25-year-old has impressed with two homers in five games, he's more of a pure hitter than a masher."
- Other types of baseball destruction include knocking the stuffing out of the ball and knocking the horsehide [cover] off the ball.

=== cue the ball ===
When a ball is hit off the end of the bat, the batter may be said to have "cued the ball" (as if he hit it with a pool cue). "Kendrick took third on a broken-bat ground-out and scored on a cued grounder to first base by Ryan Shealy ..."

=== cup of coffee ===
A short time spent by a minor league player at the major league level. The idea is that the player was there only long enough to have a cup of coffee. It can also be used to describe a very brief stay (less than a season) with a major league club.

=== curveball ===
A pitch that curves or breaks from a straight or expected flight path toward home plate. Also called simply "a curve".

=== cut ===
- A swing of the bat.
- To be removed from the roster or from the team.

=== cut fastball ===
A cut fastball or cutter is a fastball that has lateral movement. A "cut fastball" is similar to a slider that is more notable for its speed than its lateral movement.

=== cut down on his swing ===
When a batter reduces the amplitude of his swing, either by choking up on the bat or just by starting his swing less far behind his head, he "cuts down on his swing", thereby helping him to get his bat around faster. Also "shorten his swing". "Guerrero swung so hard during an 0-for-5 night Tuesday he looked as if he might come right out of his spikes. So, Hatcher suggested Wednesday that Guerrero widen his stance slightly, a move that forces hitters to cut down on their swing a bit."

=== cut the ball off ===
When a ball is hit in the gap between outfielders, a fielder often has to make a choice whether to run toward the fence to catch or retrieve the ball or to run toward the ball and try to field it before it gets by him and reaches the fence. In the latter case, he's said to "cut the ball off" because he's trying to shorten the path of the ball. "When Granderson drifted towards left-center field on Carlos Peña's fifth-inning line drive, he wasn't heading that direction to make a catch. He was preparing to field it on the bounce. 'I was actually getting into position to cut the ball off', Granderson said after the Tigers' 11–7 loss to the Rays Monday afternoon. 'I didn't think I was going to have a chance to catch it.' "

=== cut-off ===
A defensive tactic where a fielder moves into a position between the outfielder who has fielded the batted ball and the base where a play can be made. This fielder is said to "cut off" the throw or to be the "cut-off man". This tactic increases accuracy over long distances and shortens the time required to get a ball to a specific place. It also gives the cut-off man the choice of putting out a trailing runner trying to advance on the throw if he thinks it impossible to make the play at home. Missing the cut-off (man) is considered a mistake by an outfielder (though not scored as an error) because it may allow a runner to advance or to score.

=== cut-off man ===
A fielder who "cuts off" a long throw to an important target. Often the shortstop, second baseman, or first baseman will be the "cut-off man" for a long throw from the outfield to third base or home plate. "Hit the cut-off man" is a common admonition from a coach.

=== cycle ===
See hit for the cycle.

== D ==
=== daisy cutter ===
Old-fashioned term for a hard-hit ground ball, close enough to the grass to theoretically lop the tops off any daisies that might be growing on the field.

=== dance ===
The erratic movement of a well-thrown knuckleball. "Hopefully his knuckler doesn't dance, and hangs a little, or we're in trouble."

=== dark one ===
A pitch that is difficult to see, much less hit. "Throw him the dark one" is an encouragement to the pitcher, typically given with two strikes, to throw a strike past the batter.

=== dead arm ===
When a normally effective or dominant pitcher seems unable to throw as hard as he usually does, he may be said to have a "dead arm". "If you have watched the radar gun when Carlos Zambrano has pitched this month, you know something's not right. The problem, the Cubs right-hander said Saturday, is that he's going through a 'dead arm' phase."

=== dead ball ===
The ball becomes "dead" (i.e., the game's action is stopped) after a foul ball and in cases of fan or player interference, umpire interference with a catcher, and several other specific situations. When the ball is dead, no runners may advance beyond bases they are entitled to, and no runners may be put out. The ball becomes "live" again when the umpire signals that play is to resume.

=== dead-ball era ===
The period between 1903 and 1918, just prior to the Live Ball Era, when the composition of the baseball along with other rules tended to limit the offense, and the primary batting strategy was the inside game. Hitting a home run over the fence was a notable achievement.

=== dead pull hitter ===
A pull hitter is a batter who generally hits the ball to the same side as which he bats. That is, for a right-handed batter, who bats from the left side of the plate, will hit the ball to left field. Hitters are often referred to as dead pull if they rarely do anything other than pull the ball. A contemporary example of a dead pull hitter is Jason Giambi.

=== dead red ===
If a batter is "sitting/looking dead red" on a pitch, this means he was looking for a pitch (typically a fastball), and received it, usually hitting a home run or base hit.

=== deal ===
- Delivery of a pitch, commonly used by play-by-play announcers as the pitcher releases the ball, e.g., "Smith deals to Jones."
- Pitching effectively, e.g., "Smith is really dealing tonight."

=== decided in the last at bat ===
A team's games "decided in the last at bat" are those with a winning team scoring the go-ahead or winning run in its last offensive inning. In this case, "at bat" is the team's time at the plate, constituting three outs (not to be confused with an individual at bat). See also walk-off.

=== deep in the count ===
Whenever a third ball has been called, (3-0, 3-1, or 3-2 count), the situation favors the batter. "In his fourth start after missing two months following elbow surgery, Robertson … went deep in the count against many hitters but allowed just five hits and two earned runs in five innings."

=== defender ===
See fielder.

=== defensive efficiency rating ===
A sabermetric concept: the rate at which balls put into play are converted into outs by a team's defense. An analogous concept is used in the analysis of other team sports, including basketball and football. It is figured this way in baseball: 1-(((H+ROE)-HR)/(PA-(SO+HBP+HR))) where H=Hits allowed, ROE=opposing team's reached base on error, HR=home runs allowed, PA=opposing team's number of plate appearances, SO=team's pitching strikeouts, and HBP=pitcher's hit-by-pitch.

=== defensive indifference ===
When the defense allows a baserunner to advance one or more bases. The runner then does not get credit for a stolen base because the base was "given" not "stolen". The defense may allow this in the ninth inning with a large lead, where the focus is on inducing the final batters to make outs.

=== deliver ===
- To deliver is to pitch. Announcer: "Koufax delivers ... Strike three!!!"
- Delivery is the basic arm angles of pitchers, e.g., overhand delivery, sidearm delivery. This is in contrast to cricket, in which the term "delivery" is akin to type of pitch in baseball.

=== designated for assignment ===
A process that allows a player to be removed from his team's 40-man roster.

=== designated hitter ===
The designated hitter (DH) is a player who permanently hits in the place of a defensive player (typically the pitcher) and whose only role in the game is to hit. The American League has used the DH since 1973, while the National League did not permanently adopt the role until 2022.

=== deuce ===
- A curveball, because the catcher's sign is usually made by extending the first two fingers.
- A double play.
From playing cards, where the "2" card is conventionally called the "deuce".

=== deuces wild ===
When a large quantity of the number "2" appears on the scoreboard at the same time: 2 baserunners, 2 outs, 2 balls and 2 strikes on the batter. Derived from the poker phrase "deuces are wild". Often used by Hall of Fame broadcaster Vin Scully.

=== DFA ===
An abbreviation of designated for assignment.

=== DH ===
Designated hitter

=== dial long distance ===
To hit a home run. Headline: "Sox Sluggers Dial Long Distance—Ramirez, Ortiz Each Crank Two-Run Homers." The phrase is sometimes stated as "Dial 9 for long distance."

=== dialed up ===
Referring to a fastball. "He dialed up that pitch."

=== diamond ===
The layout of the four bases in the infield. It's actually a square 90 feet (27 m) on each side, but from the stands it resembles a parallelogram or "diamond".

=== die ===
A fly ball is said to die if it travels a shorter distance from home plate than initially expected due to wind or other aerodynamic factors. Not to be confused with dead ball.

=== dig it out ===
- To field a ball on or near the ground. Usually a first baseman taking a low throw from another infielder. To "dig it out of the dirt".
- To run hard through first base on a close ground ball play in an attempt to beat the throw.

=== dinged (up) ===
Injured; often used in reference to persistent minor injuries.

=== dinger ===
A home run.

=== dirt-nap ===
To trip or fall in the outfield or on the base paths. A blown save may also be referred to as a dirt-nap.

=== disabled list ===
A means by which Major League teams may temporarily remove injured players from their active roster. Another player can then be called up as a replacement during this time. The term "disabled list" was replaced by "injured list" prior to the 2019 MLB season.

=== dish ===
- The Hitter (Batter) stands off the dish [Home Plate].
- Home plate. "The catcher settles in behind the dish."
- A pitch, particularly a good one. "Here comes the dish (the pitch)", or "He's really dishing it (pitching well) tonight."

=== diving over the plate ===
When a batter tends to lean in toward the plate so he can more easily hit a ball that is on the outside of the strike zone, he is said to be "diving over the plate" or "diving for the pitch". To protect the strike zone, a pitcher may respond to this by pitching the ball inside, perhaps with a "purpose pitch". "Now Glavine has an equalizer with his cutter. He can bore it into the hands of righthanders to keep them from diving over the plate with impunity at his sinker and changeup."

=== DL ===
The disabled list. Sometimes used as a verb, as in "Wood was DL'ed yesterday."

=== doctoring the ball ===
Applying a foreign substance to the ball or otherwise altering it in order to put an unnatural spin on a pitch. Examples: By applying Vaseline or saliva (a spitball), or scuffing with sandpaper, emery board (an emery ball), or by rubbing vigorously to create a shiny area of the ball (a shineball). All of these became illegal beginning in the 1920 season, helping to end the dead-ball era. (Official Rules of Baseball, Rule 8.02(a).) In practice, there are ambiguities about what kinds of things a pitcher can legally do.

A number of famous cases of doctoring the bat have also occurred in the Major Leagues. See corked bat.

=== dong ===
A home run.

=== dot ===
A slang term for the pitcher hitting the batter with a pitched ball (knockdown pitch), either intentionally or accidentally. If a player "shows up" a pitcher (taking a long time to circle the bases or having an excessive celebration after a home run), if an important player on a team is struck by a pitch, or a player violates of one of baseball's unwritten rules, the offending player can expect to get "dotted" the next time he is at bat as a form of intimidation or correction of the perceived offense. One of the "unwritten rules" is that the "dotting" done by the pitcher should be below chest level on the batter to minimize risk of injury as a higher pitch risks injuries to the hands or even the head. Pitching higher is known as "head hunting" or "buzzing the tower", and puts the pitcher at risk of actual violence by the other team.

- When a pitcher is throwing strikes on the corners of the strike zone, it is said he is dotting the corners.

=== double ===
A hit where the batter makes it safely to second base before the ball can be returned to the infield. Also a two-base hit.

=== double clutch ===
When a fielder – usually an infielder or a catcher – draws his arm back twice before throwing he's said to "double clutch". This hesitation often leads to a delayed or late throw, allowing runners to advance a base. The term is borrowed from a method of shifting gears on an automotive vehicle.

=== double parked ===
A pitcher who is getting a lot of quick outs. Implies that he has parked his car illegally and is trying to get back to it and avoid a ticket, and this is why he is keen to get outs quickly.

=== double play ===
- A play by the defense where two offensive players are put out as a result of continuous action resulting in two outs. A typical example is the 6-4-3 double play.
- The double play combination (or DP combo) on a team consists of the shortstop and the second baseman, because these players are the key players in a 6-4-3 or 4-6-3 double play. They are also sometimes called sackmates because they play either side of second base (also known as second sack).

'Roll a bump' is a colloquial east coast slang for turning a 1-6-3 double play or a 1-4-3 double play.

=== double play depth ===
A defensive tactic that positions the middle infielders to be better prepared for a double play at the expense of positioning for a hit to the third-base side.

=== double steal ===
Two runners attempt to simultaneously steal a base. Typically this is seen when runners who are on first and second make an attempt to steal second and third. Another common example is when a runner on first steals second, enticing the catcher to throw down to second so the runner on third can then steal home.

=== double switch ===
The double switch is a type of player substitution that allows a manager to make a pitching substitution and defensive (fielding) substitution while at the same time improving the team's offensive (batting) lineup. This is most effectively used when a pitcher needs to be replaced while his team is on defense, and his turn to bat is coming up in his team's next offensive try. Rather than replace the pitcher with another pitcher, a position player (one who recently batted in his team's last offensive try) is replaced with a new pitcher, and the outgoing pitcher is replaced by a player able to play the position of the outgoing position player. The two subs then trade to their natural defensive roles but keep the batting order positions of those they replaced so that when the team next comes up to bat, it is the newly subbed position player who hits during the turn of the vacated pitcher, and the new pitcher does not have to hit until the outgoing position player's turn comes again. The double switch is primarily used by leagues that do not use designated hitters, such as Japan's Central League, or the National League prior to 2022.

=== double up ===
- When a runner becomes the second out in a double play, he may be said to have been doubled up (or doubled off). This could be a batter who has hit into a double play or a runner who is caught off base when a fielder catches a ball and throws behind the runner to a fielder who touches the base to complete a double play (hence "doubling up" the runner).
- A team that wins a doubleheader may be described as having doubled up their opponent: "Royals double up Blue Jays". Also refers to winning by exactly double the amount of runs of the opponent, such as an 8–4 or 6–3 score.

=== doubleheader ===
When two games are played by the same two teams on the same day. When the games are played late in the day, they are referred to as a "twilight-night" or "twinight" doubleheader. When one game is played in the afternoon and one in the evening (typically with separate admission fees), it is referred to as a "day-night" doubleheader. A doubleheader can also be referred to as a Twinbill. In minor league and college baseball, doubleheader games are often scheduled for seven innings rather than the standard nine for a regulation game.
According to the Dickson dictionary, the term is thought to derive from a railroading term for using two joined engines (a "double header") to pull an exceptionally long train.

=== doubles hitter ===
A gap hitter.

=== "down" ===
Put out. "One down" means one out has been made in the inning (two more to go in the inning). "One up (and) one down" means the first batter in the inning was out. "Two down" means two outs have been made in the inning (one more to go). "Two up (and) two down": the first two batters of the inning were retired (made outs). "Three up, three down": side retired in order.

=== down the line ===
On the field near the foul lines, often refers to the location of batted balls.

=== down the middle ===
Over the middle portion of home plate, often refers to the location of pitches. Also referred to as down the pipe, down the pike, down Main Street, down Broadway, and, in Atlanta, down Peachtree. Very different from up the middle.

=== down the stretch ===
When a team is approaching the end of the season in pursuit of the pennant or championship, it is heading down the stretch. Perhaps this derives from horse racing or automobile racing in which competitors come out of the final turn of the track and are heading down the home stretch toward the finish line. "Detroit provided more than enough offense for Fister, who was terrific down the stretch after the Tigers acquired him in a trade with Seattle shortly before the July 31 deadline."

=== DP combo ===
A slang term for a shortstop and second baseman combination, as primary executors of double plays. They are also occasionally referred to as sackmates. Generally speaking, only the best sets of middle infielders get called DP combos.

=== drag bunt ===
A bunt in which a left-handed hitter lays down a bunt out of the reach of the pitcher and toward the right side of the infield, in hopes that he will safely reach first base. Often such a bunt has an element of surprise to take advantage of the batter's speed and the fact that the first baseman and second baseman are playing their positions back. The batter may even take a stride toward first base as he bunts the ball, thereby appearing to drag the ball with him as he runs toward first base.

=== draw ===
A batter who gets called balls is sometimes said to have "drawn a ball" or "drawn a walk". "Bonds drew ball one and ball two – with boos raining down on VandenHurk - before a called first strike. Then, the 96 mph fastball was gone – a drive estimated at 420 feet."

=== drawn in ===
- When the outfield plays closer to the infield to prevent fly balls from dropping between them and the infielders, they are said to be "drawn in". This typically happens when the game is close in the final inning, and with less than two outs, and the defensive team wants to prevent the offense from getting base hits that might score the winning run (while conceding that a long fly ball might score a run even if the ball is caught in the outfield).
- The infield may also be drawn in if there is a runner on third base with less than two outs, so that the infielders may field a ground ball and attempt to throw out the runner at the plate.
- A single infielder, typically the third baseman or the first baseman may also play "in" when it's anticipated that a batter may attempt to make a sacrifice bunt.

=== dribbler ===
A poorly hit grounder that gains little distance and consists of several hops; sometimes used synonymously with tapper

=== drilled ===
Hit by a pitch, plunked.

=== drive ===
- A line drive (noun).
- To hit a line drive (verb). "Magglio drove the ball to center."
- To make hits that produce RBIs. "Tejada drove him home from second." "Ramirez drove in three."

=== drop ===
- To lose a game. "Clumsy Rays Drop to Tigers, 6-4"
- To beat another team is also to drop them. Headline: "Dodgers one win from clinching playoff berth after dropping Nationals."
- Bat drop.

=== drop ball ===
- A sinkerball. Also known as a dropper or el droppo.
- Some extreme 12-to-6 curveballs are also referred to as "drop balls", since they start high and dive as they reach the plate.

=== drop off the table ===
A pitched ball, usually a curveball, that breaks extremely sharply.

=== dropped third strike ===
A dropped third strike occurs when the catcher fails to cleanly catch a pitch which is a third strike (either because the batter swings and misses it or because the umpire calls it). The pitch is considered not cleanly caught if the ball touches the dirt before being caught, or if the ball is dropped after being caught. On a dropped third strike, the strike is called (and a pitcher gets credited with a strike-out), but the umpire indicates verbally that the ball was not caught, and does not call the batter out. If first base is not occupied at the time (or, with two outs, even with first base occupied), the batter can then attempt to reach first base prior to being tagged or thrown out. Given this rule, it is possible for a pitcher to record more than three strike-outs in an inning.

=== duck snort ===
A softly hit ball that goes over the infielders and lands in the outfield for a hit. Originally called a "duck fart", the term was popularized by White Sox announcer Hawk Harrelson to make it more family friendly.

=== ducks on the pond ===
Runners on second or third base, but especially when the bases are loaded. "His batting average is .350 when there are ducks on the pond."

=== due ===
A batter is said to be "due" when he's been in a hitting slump, but he usually hits for a fair or better average. Example: "The batter is 0-for-3 today, he's due for a hit." This is a baseball version of the gambler's fallacy.

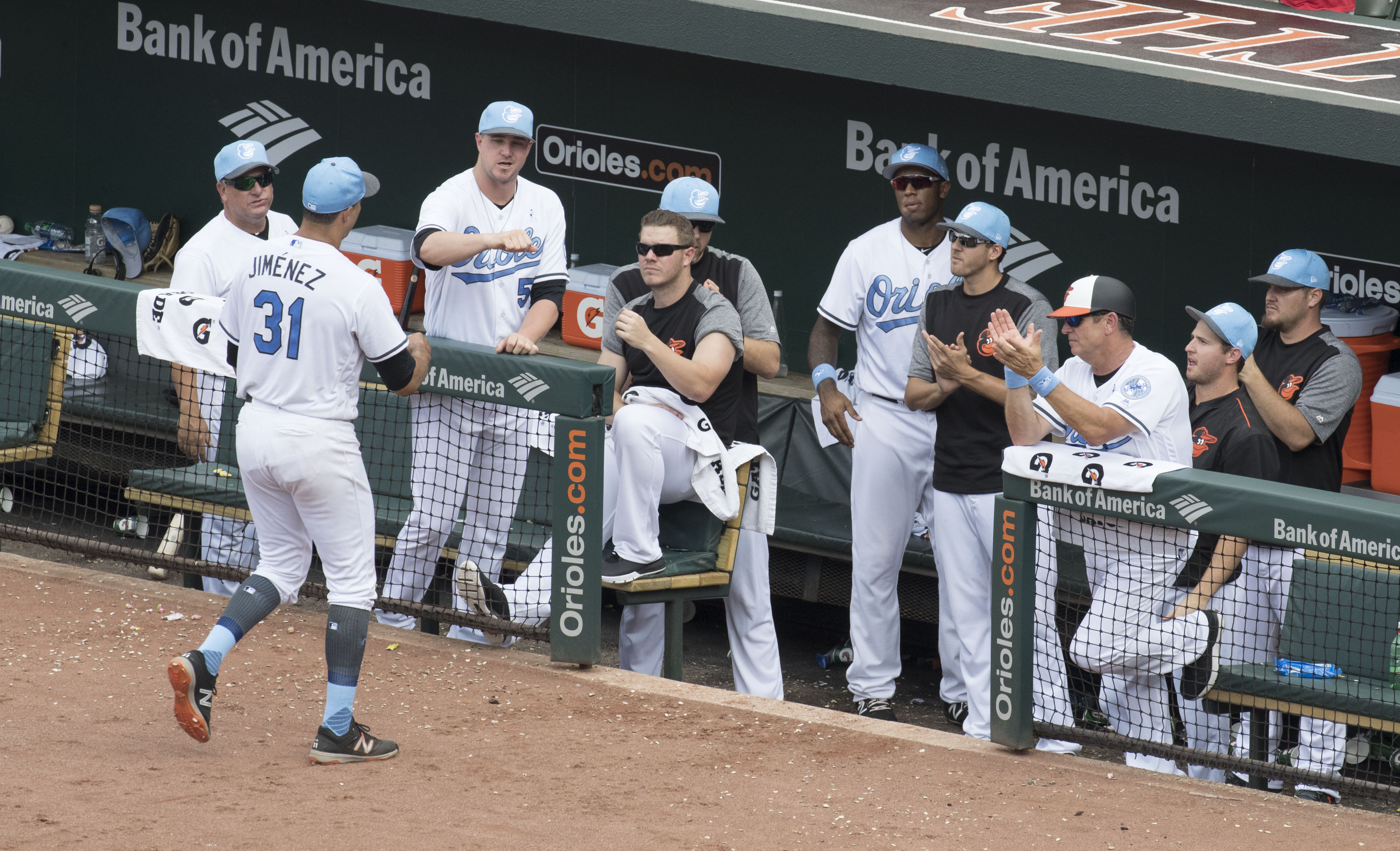
The home team's dugout at Oriole Park at Camden Yards in 2017

=== dugout ===
The dugout is where a team's bench is located. With the exception of relief pitchers in the bullpen, active players who are not on the field watch the play from the dugout. A dugout is the area being slightly depressed below field level, as is common in professional baseball. There is typically a boundary, often painted yellow, defining the edges of the dugout, to help the umpire make certain calls, such as whether an overthrown ball is considered to be "in the bench" or not. The rule book still uses the term bench, as there is no requirement that it be "dug out" or necessarily below field level. The original benches typically were at field level, with or without a little roof for shade. As ballpark design progressed, box seats were built closer to the field, lowering the height of the grandstand railing, and compelling the dugout approach to bench construction.

=== dump ===
A player who bunts the ball may be said to dump a bunt. "Polanco dumped a bunt down the third base line." See also lay down. A right handed hitter dumps a bunt to third and pushes the bunt to first. A left handed hitter drags the ball to first and pushes the bunt to third

=== duster, dust-off pitch ===
A pitch, often a brush-back, thrown so far inside that the batter drops to the ground ("hits the dust") to avoid it. Somewhat contradictorily, on the same play the pitcher may be said to have "dusted off" the batter.

=== dying quail ===
A batted ball that drops in front of the outfielders for a hit, often unexpectedly (like a shot bird). Also known as a blooper, a li'l looper, a chinker, a bleeder, or a gork.

== E ==
=== ERA ===
See earned run average.

=== early innings ===
The first three innings of a regulation nine-inning game.

=== earned run ===
Any run for which the pitcher is held accountable (i.e., the run did not score as a result of a fielding error or a passed ball). Primarily used to calculate the earned run average. In determining earned runs, an error charged to a pitcher is treated exactly like an error charged to any other fielder. Some pitchers, notably Ed Lynch, referred to earned runs as "earnies".

=== earned run average ===
In baseball statistics, earned run average is the mean of earned runs given up by a pitcher per nine innings pitched. It is determined by dividing the number of earned runs allowed by the number of innings pitched and multiplying by nine. Runs resulting from defensive errors are recorded as unearned runs and omitted from ERA calculations.

=== earnie ===
An earned run. "The unlucky loser was Carson Wheeler, who gave up six earnies in one plus innings of work."

=== easy out ===
A reminder to the defensive team that when there are two outs only one more is needed to end the inning, and therefore they should get the easiest out possible. "Let's go D, two away, get the easy out." An easy out is also a weak-hitting batter, usually at the bottom of the order.

=== eat the ball ===
The action of fielding a batted ball (usually cleanly or almost so) but holding on to it rather than attempting to make a throw to a base to retire a runner. This is usually done because the fielder believes there is little chance of retiring the runner and that it would be preferable to allow the runner to reach one base unchallenged rather than risk committing an error that might allow the runner to advance additional bases. The phrase is usually used only to describe the action of an infielder, catcher, or pitcher. "Gordon's game-tying chopper over the mound left a charging Castro with little choice but to eat the ball." Also used in the past tense. "Third baseman Isaac Paredes ate the ball, knowing he had no chance to throw out the speedy center fielder."

=== Eephus ===
A very slow pitch with a high arcing trajectory. Invented by 1930s Pittsburgh Pirates hurler Rip Sewell, it is a part of Phillies pitcher Jose Contreras' repertoire; thrown very rarely to fool a hitter's timing. It is best used sparingly, because it can be very easy to hit without the element of surprise. Ted Williams hit the only home run off Sewell's eephus, coming in the 1946 All-Star Game.

=== eject ===
A player or coach who is disqualified from the game by an umpire for unsportsmanlike conduct. Synonyms include: tossed, thrown out, banished, chased, given the thumb, given the (ol') heave-ho, kicked out, booted, run, sent to the clubhouse.

=== elephant ear(s) ===
When the lining of a player's pockets are sticking out of the pockets.

=== emergency hack ===
A late and often awkward defensive swing at a pitch that usually appears to be a ball but breaks late into the strike zone.

=== emergency starter ===
When a pitcher who is normally a reliever or in the minor leagues is called on to start the game on short notice because the originally scheduled starter is injured or ill. Illustration: "With Chan Ho Park sidelined indefinitely by what was diagnosed as anemia, Mike Thompson is expected to get the call yet again as the emergency starter, arriving via Portland, where he has spent the past 10 days with the Triple-A Beavers."

=== emery ball ===
A baseball that has been scuffed by an emery board. A method for a pitcher to doctor the ball; illegal since 1920. Also known as a scuff ball.

=== erase ===
A runner who is already safely on a base is "erased" by being thrown out.

=== error ===
- An error is a fielder's misplay which allows a batter or baserunner to reach one or more additional bases when, in the judgment of the official scorer, that advance could have been prevented by ordinary effort. An error is also charged when a fielder fails to catch a foul fly ball that could have been caught with ordinary effort. The term error can also refer to the play in which an error was committed. Because the pitcher and catcher handle the ball so much, some misplays by them are called a "wild pitch" or a "passed ball", and are not counted as errors.
- SYNONYMS: bobble, blooper, muff, miscue, flub, kick or boot ("Lopez kicked the grounder"; "Johnson booted it".)

=== even count ===
1-1 or 2-2. See count.

=== everyday player ===
- A position player, as opposed to a pitcher who may play only every few days. Sometimes a talented prospect who is a good pitcher but an outstanding hitter will be encouraged to focus on playing another position and thereby become an everyday player to take advantage of his hitting.
- A position player who's a regular in the starting line-up in virtually every game, as opposed to either:
  - a platoon player who plays only against pitchers of the opposite hand.
  - a substitute who begins most games on the bench or only occasionally starts games to spell the regular starting player at his position. Sometimes these players are referred to as bench players or role players. They may also take on pinch hitting or pinch running assignments.

=== Evil Empire ===
A common nickname for the New York Yankees due to its wealth and winning by far the most championships. This nickname is used especially by fans of the Boston Red Sox and by fans of other teams to a lesser extent. Even some Yankees fans have been known to call themselves and their team the "Evil Empire" as a badge of honor.

=== excuse me swing ===
When a batter inadvertently hits the ball during a check swing. Contrast with swinging bunt.

=== exit velocity ===
The speed at which the ball leaves the bat after being hit by a batter.

=== expand the strike zone ===
When a pitcher gets ahead in the count, he "expands the strike zone" because the hitter is more likely to swing at a pitch that is at the edge or out of the strike zone or in some other location where he can't hit it. "Ideally, a pitcher is going to try and get ahead in the count and when this happens the pitcher has effectively 'expanded the strike zone' since the batter is now on the defensive and will be more prone to chase pitches outside the strike zone."

=== expanded roster ===
A Major League term for the larger roster of players that can be used under specific circumstances, such as when gaining an extra player on days of a double header or the previous (before 2019) controversial practice when major league rosters could expand from 25 to up to 40 players on September 1.

=== extend the arms ===
When a batter is able to hit a pitch that is at a comfortable distance from his body, he is said to have "extended his arms", which allows a full swing and hitting the ball harder. "J. D. Martinez has hit two homers in three career at-bats off Allen, who was trying to protect a 2–1 lead against the middle of Detroit's vaunted lineup. 'I was just overthrowing it', Allen said. 'I just didn't make pitches when I had to. One pitch – J. D. Martinez got extended on a fastball and hit it very hard.'"

=== extra bases ===
Any bases gained by a batter beyond first base on a hit. So doubles count for one "extra base", triples for two, and home runs for three. These kinds of hits are referred to as "extra base hits" and improve a batter's slugging percentage.

=== extra innings ===
Additional innings needed to determine a winner if a game is tied after the regulation number of innings (nine at the college/professional level, seven at high school level, six in Little League). Also known as bonus baseball or free baseball because paying spectators are witnessing more action than normal. It is sometimes, but not commonly, referred to as "overtime" as a play on other team sports.

=== extra frames ===
See extra innings. Also see frame.

=== extra out ===
When a team makes a mistake on a defensive play that should have been an easy out, the team is said to have given its opponent an "extra out". "'There were a couple of innings where we gave them extra outs,' Wedge said. 'They may not be errors, but we're not making plays.'"

=== eyewash ===
Baseball slang for the concept of "fake hustle" or "working hard for the appearance of working hard".

== F ==
=== fall classic ===
The World Series—the championship series of Major League Baseball, in which the champion of the American League faces off against the champion of the National League. Typically, this series takes place in October, so playing in October is the goal of any major league team. Reggie Jackson's moniker "Mr. October" indicates that he played with great distinction in the World Series for the Yankees. Another Yankee, Derek Jeter, picked up the nickname "Mr. November" after he hit a walk-off home run in Game 4 of the 2001 World Series just after midnight local time on November 1. By comparison, Yankees owner George Steinbrenner's dubbing another of his players (Dave Winfield) "Mr. May" expressed his disappointment with that player's performance in the Fall Classic.

The one time the Fall Classic was actually played in the summer was 1918, when the season was curtailed due to World War I and the Series was played in early September.

The first time the Fall Classic extended in to November was in 2001. Jeter's walk-off homer was the first plate appearance in the month of November in MLB history; the 2001 season had been delayed for several days following 9/11, eventually pushing the start of the World Series into the last week of October – and the end of the Series in to November. The 2009, 2010, 2015–17 and 2025 World Series would subsequently have games in November.

=== fall off the table ===
A pitch is said to "fall off the table" when it starts in the strike zone or appears hittable to the batter and ends low or in the dirt. This term is mainly used for change ups and split-fingered fastballs, and occasionally for an overhand curveball.

=== fan ===
To "fan" a batter is to strike him out, especially a swinging strike three.

=== fan interference ===
When a fan or any person not associated with one of the teams alters play in progress (in the judgment of an umpire), it is fan interference. The ball becomes dead, and the umpire will award any bases or charge any outs that, in his judgment, would have occurred without the interference. This is one of several types of interference calls in baseball.

If a fan touches a ball that is out of the field of play, such as a pop fly into the stands, it is not considered to be fan interference even if a defensive player might have fielded the ball successfully. So the infamous case in Game 6 of the NLCS in which a Chicago Cubs fan, Steve Bartman, attempted to catch a ball in foul territory thereby possibly preventing Cubs left fielder Moisés Alou from making a circus catch, was not a case of fan interference.

=== fancy Dan ===
A fielder who puts an extra flourish on his movements while making a play in hopes of gaining the approval of the spectators. Wilbert Robinson was manager when Al López started out as a catcher in the majors. Robinson watched Lopez' style and finally hollered, "Tell that punk he got two hands to catch with! Never mind the Fancy Dan stuff." Lopez went on to eventually surpass Robinson's record of games behind the plate.

=== farm team ===
A farm team is a team or club whose role it is to provide experience and training for young players, with an expectation that successful players will move to the big leagues at some point. Each Major League Baseball team's organization has a farm system of affiliated farm teams at different minor league baseball levels.

=== FARTSLAM ===
A humorous term for when a fielder commits an error allowing a runner to score. It stands for "Fielder Allows Runner To Score Like A Moron".

=== fastball ===
A pitch that is thrown more for high velocity than for movement; it is the most common type of pitch. Also known as smoke, a bullet, a heater (the heat generated by the ball can be felt), the express (as opposed to the local, an offspeed pitch), or a hummer (the ball cannot be seen, only heard).

=== fastball count ===
A count in which the pitcher would be ordinarily expected to throw a fastball, such as 3–1, 3–2, or 2–1, as fast ball are usually easiest to locate in the strike zone. Occasionally a pitcher will pull the string by throwing an off-speed pitch.

=== fastball happy ===
When a pitcher relies too much on his fastball, perhaps because his other pitches are not working well for him during that game, he is said to be "fastball happy". This can get a pitcher into trouble if the batters can anticipate that the next pitch will be a fastball. "Andy is at his best when he trusts his breaking stuff and doesn't try to overpower guys. When he gets fastball happy he gets knocked around."

=== fat pitch ===
A pitch that is located exactly where the hitter is expecting it. The ball may look bigger than it actually is, and the batter may hit it a long way.

=== feed ===
To throw the ball carefully to another fielder in a way that allows him to make an out. A first-baseman who has just fielded a ground ball will "feed the ball" to the pitcher who is running over from the mound to make the force out at first base. An infielder who has fielded a ground-ball will feed the ball to the player covering second base so the latter can step on the base and quickly throw to first base to complete a double play.

=== fencebuster ===
A slugger.

=== field ===
- A baseball field or baseball diamond upon which the game of baseball is played.
- A ballfield, ballpark, or stadium (e.g., Dodger Stadium, Wrigley Field, Hubert H. Humphrey Metrodome).
- To field the ball is to capture or make a play on a ground ball or to catch a fly ball.
- To take the field means the defensive players are going to their positions, while the other team is on the offense or at bat. "The Reds have taken the field, and Jose Reyes is leading off for the Mets."

=== fielder ===
Any defensive player (the offense being batters and runners). Often, defensive players are distinguished as either pitchers or position players. Position players are further divided into infielders and outfielders.

=== field manager ===
The head coach of a team is called the manager (more formally, the field manager). He controls team strategy on the field. He sets the line-up and starting pitcher before each game as well as making substitutions throughout the game. In modern baseball the field manager is normally subordinate to the team's general manager (or GM), who among other things is responsible for personnel decisions, including hiring and firing the field manager. However, the term manager used without qualification almost always refers to the field manager.

=== fielder's choice ===
A fielder's choice (FC) is the act of a fielder, upon fielding a batted ball, choosing to try to putout a baserunner and allow the batter-runner to advance to first base. Despite reaching first base safely after hitting the ball, the batter is not credited with a hit but would be charged with an at-bat.

=== figger filbert ===
An old-fashioned and more colorful way of saying "numbers nut" or stathead, for a fan with a near-obsessive interest in the statistics or "figures" of the game. The first "figger filbert" was probably Ernest Lanigan, who was the first historian of the Baseball Hall of Fame and prior to that was one of the first, if not the first, to publish an encyclopedia of baseball stats, in the 1920s. Later statistical analysts were often called sabermetricians.

=== fight off a pitch ===
When a batter has two strikes on him and gets a pitch he cannot hit cleanly, he may be said to "fight off the pitch" by fouling it off. "Langerhans fought off one 3-2 pitch, then drove the next one to the gap in left-center to bring home the tying and winning runs."

=== filthy ===
A compliment for a pitcher, especially one who specializes in breaking balls with a lot of movement. Also for a particularly impressive breaking ball, especially one thrown for a third strike. Synonymous with "nasty". Bert Blyleven was an example of one of these pitchers.

=== find a hole ===
To get a base hit by hitting the ball between infielders. "The 13th groundball that Zachry allowed found a hole."

=== find his bat ===
When a batter has been in a slump perhaps for no evident reason, but then starts getting hits, he may be said to have "found his bat". "With the Tigers having found their bats for a night, they reset the series and put themselves in position to all but lock up the AL Central."

=== find his swing ===
When a batter has experienced a slump, he may take extra practice or instruction to "find his swing". Perhaps he has a hitch in his swing, or his batting stance has changed. Having "lost his swing", now he must "find it". This phrase is also used in golf.

=== find the seats ===
As if a ball leaving the bat is in search of a place to land, a ball that "finds the seats" is one that leaves the field of play and reaches the stands. It may either be a home run or a foul ball (out of the reach of the fielders).

=== fireballer ===
A pitcher who throws extremely high-velocity fastballs, in excess of 95 miles per hour. A flamethrower.

=== fireman ===
A team's top relief pitcher who is often brought in to end an offensive rally and "put out the fire". The term has been attributed to New York Daily News cartoonist Bruce Stark, who in the 1970s first depicted relievers for the New York Mets and Yankees as firemen coming in to save their teams from danger.

=== fireplug ===
A player, often of smaller physical stature, who is characterized by high-energy, an extroverted personality, and strong team spirit – sometimes contrasting with their assumed playing ability. While this archetype implies a limited physical capability, Hall of Famer Joe Morgan often defied the stereotype by combining intense work ethic with elite athletic production. Despite his smaller stature, Morgan became one of the premier all-around players in his era, demonstrating high offensive utility by hitting for power and average, maximizing base-running opportunities, and generating runs. He was a relentless fireplug, gaining a reputation as a highly intelligent and resilient defensive second basemen who was respected by his peers and opposing players.

=== first-ball hitter ===
A hitter who likes to hit the first pitch in an at bat, especially if the hitter often gets a hit on the first pitch.

=== fisted ===
When a batter swings at a pitch that is inside and the ball hits the bat close to his fists (hands). "Following the top half of the first, the Bulls offense struck early when junior leftfielder Junior Carlin fisted a pitch back up the middle on a 1–0 count."

=== five and dive ===
A derogatory term referring to a starting pitcher who is unable to go beyond five innings before wearing out. In the current era in which managers are increasingly aware of the risk of injury to pitchers who have high pitch counts, and in which relief pitching has become a critical part of the game, starters achieve fewer and fewer complete games. Headline: "Vasquez Disputes Five-and-Dive Label".

=== five o'clock hitter ===
A hitter who hits really well during batting practice, but not so well during games. These were formerly known as "ten o'clock hitters" or "two-o'clock hitters" back when there were no night games.

=== five-tool player ===
See 5-tool player.

=== FL or F.L. ===
Abbreviation for Federal League, a major league that existed from 1914 to 1915. This would be the last "third Major League" to come into existence.

=== flag down ===
To catch or knock down a line drive, as if flagging down a moving vehicle. "Cowens twice went to the warning track in the outfield to flag down drives by Milwaukee hitters."

=== flamethrower ===
A fireballer.

=== flare ===
A fly ball hit a short distance into the outfield. "Pudge hit a flare just out of the shortstop's reach."

=== flashing the leather ===
Making an outstanding or difficult defensive play. A player who regularly makes difficult defensive plays may be described as a "leather flasher". See leather.

=== flip ===
- The act of a fielder's softly tossing the ball to a teammate covering a base when the two are so close that making a regular overhand throw would waste time and/or unnecessarily risk an inaccurate throw.
- A game played in the bullpen by relief pitchers. There are multiple rules and strategies that can be used.

=== floater ===
A knuckleball. A pitch that may appear to the batter to float or bob up and down on its way to the plate.

=== fluke hit ===
A base hit that results from a weakly batted ball or one that takes an odd bounce.

=== flutterball ===
A knuckleball, a floater.

=== fly ball ===
A ball hit high in the air. See also pop fly, infield fly, and ground ball.

=== fly ball pitcher ===
A pitcher who tends to induce more fly balls than ground balls. Those pitchers are disadvantageous in that they allow more home runs than any other pitcher.

=== fly out ===
- An out that results from an outfielder catching a fly ball.
- A batter whose fly ball is caught in the outfield is said to "fly out". "Rodriguez flew out to center fielder Suzuki." (Past tense "flied" is acceptable.)

=== folded ===
Synonymous with "buckled" where a pitcher throws a breaking ball (typically a curveball) that starts inside, appearing to the batter that it may hit him, causing him to duck, but which breaks into the zone. It refers to the folding of the knees as the batter attempts to move out of the way.

=== force play ===
- Any play where a runner is forced to advance because the batter has become a runner after hitting a fair ball not caught. Any runner put out is considered to have been forced out for the purpose of determining whether a run has scored, if that runner is put out before reaching the base to which he is forced to advance. No run may score on a play where the third out is the result of a force play, whether that runner is tagged or a fielder with secure possession of the ball touches the base to which the runner is forced to advance.
- The term "force out" is generally used to refer to any time a runner is put out because a fielder with secure possession of the ball touches the base to which the runner is forced to advance on a force play before the runner reaches the base.
- The term "force out" is also used to refer to a runner who is put out when a fielder with secure possession of the ball touches the base which a runner is forced to retouch after a batted ball is caught in flight by a fielder.

=== forkball ===
A type of split-finger fastball or splitter in which the fingers are spread out as far as possible. The ball drops sharply and typically out of the strike zone, maybe even into the dirt.

=== foul ball ===
A batted ball that settles into foul territory.

=== foul lines ===
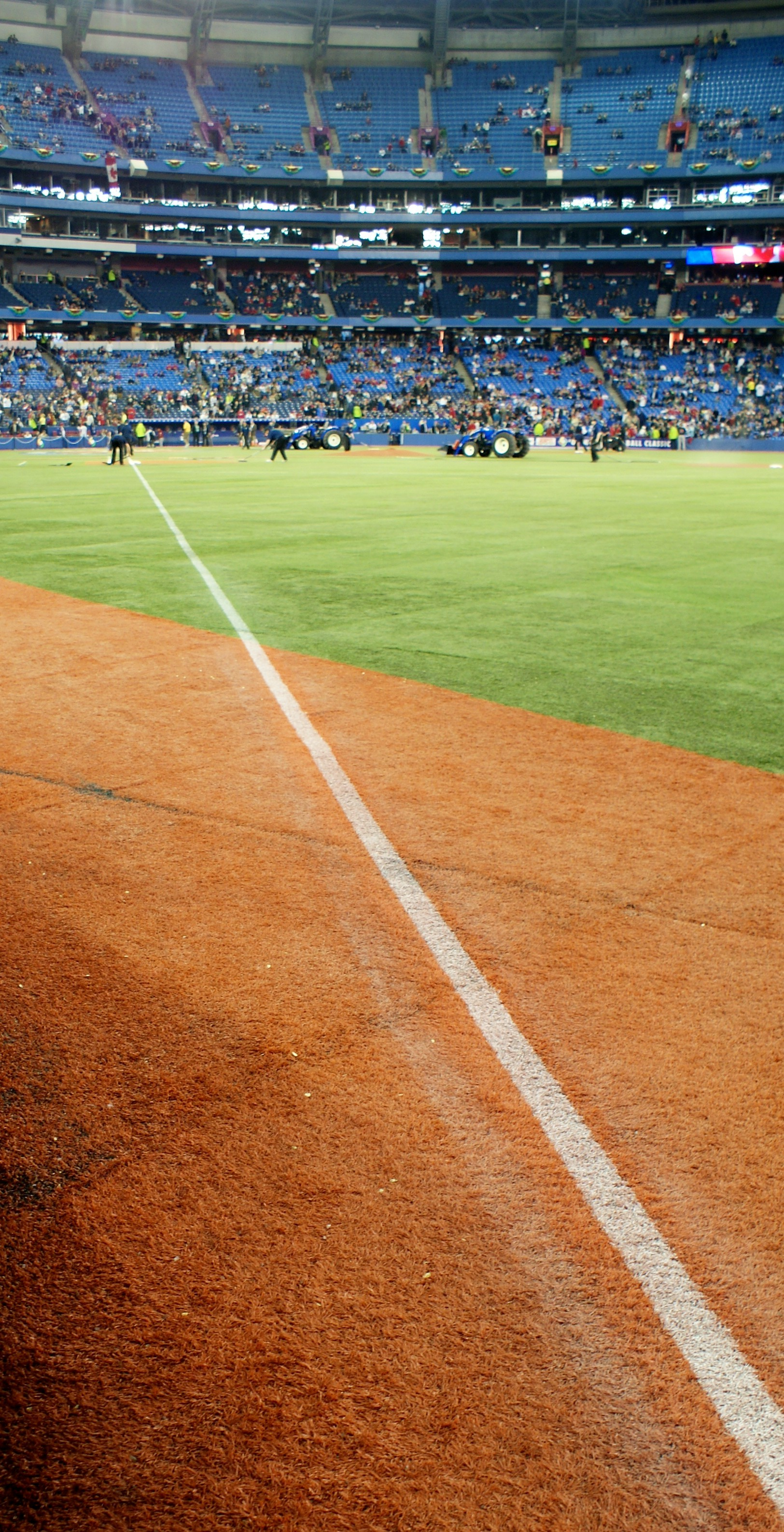
The right field foul line at Rogers Centre

Two straight lines drawn on the ground from home plate to the outfield fence to indicate the boundary between fair territory and foul territory. These are called either the left-field foul line and the right-field foul line, or the third-base foul line and first-base foul line, respectively. The foul poles on the outfield walls are vertical extensions of the foul lines.

Despite their names, both the foul lines and the foul poles are in fair territory. Any fly ball that strikes the foul line (including the foul pole) beyond first or third base is a fair ball (and in the case of the foul pole, a home run).

Note that while the foul lines in baseball are in fair territory, just like the side- and end-lines of a tennis court, in basketball or American football the sidelines are considered out of bounds. In other words, hitting the ball "on the line" is good for the offensive player in baseball and tennis, but stepping on the line is bad for the offensive player in basketball and American football. The situation is slightly different in association football (soccer): the sideline and the goal line are inbounds, and the ball is out of play when it has wholly crossed the side line (touch line) or the goal line, whether on the ground or in the air.

=== foul off ===
- Purposely batting a pitch foul with two strikes in order to keep the plate appearance going, in part to tire the pitcher and in part to get another, different pitch that might be easier to hit. Luke Appling was said to be the king of "fouling them off". Such a hitter might also be said to be battling or working the pitcher.
- The act of hitting a foul ball.

=== foul pole ===
A pole located on each foul line on the outfield fence or wall. The left-field foul pole and right-field foul pole are used by umpires to determine whether a batted ball is a home run or a foul ball. The foul pole is a vertical extension of the foul line. The term "foul pole" is actually a misnomer, because the "foul pole" (like the foul line) is in fair territory and a fly ball that hits the foul pole is considered to be a fair ball (and a home run).

=== foul tip ===
A batted ball that is hit sharply and directly from the bat to the catcher's mitt and legally caught by the catcher. It is not a foul tip, as most announcers and journalists mistakenly use the term, if the ball is not caught by the catcher. In this case, it is simply a foul ball. It is also not considered a foul tip if it rebounds off something, like the ground, catcher's mask, the batter, etc. after being struck by the bat but before touching the catcher's mitt. A foul tip is considered in play, not a foul ball, and also counts as a strike, including the third strike (and is also considered a strikeout for the pitcher). It is signalled by the umpire putting his right hand flat in the air and brushing his left hand against it (imitating the ball glancing off the bat) and then using his standard strike call. If the out is not the third out then the ball is alive and in play (unlike on a foul) and runners are in jeopardy if they are trying to advance.

=== four-bagger ===
A home run. Note that the 4th "bag" is actually a plate.

=== four-fingered salute ===
An intentional base on balls, from the manager's signal to direct the pitcher to issue one, or to direct the umpire to award the batter first base.

=== four-seam fastball ===
A standard fastball, which does not necessarily break though a good one will have movement as well as velocity and location that makes it difficult to hit. The batter sees the four parallel seams spin toward him. A four-seamer. See two-seamer.

=== frame ===
- As a noun, a frame is half an inning (either the top or the bottom). Announcer: "Two hits, and two runs scored so far in this frame." Also a bowling term, as suggested by the resemblance of an inning-by-inning scoreboard to a bowling scoresheet.
- As a verb, framing [a pitch] refers to the positioning and/or movement of the catcher's mitt and body when he catches a pitch and the effect this has on the umpire calling a pitch a strike. The boundaries of the strike zone are clearly defined in the rules; however, with many major-league pitches traveling well in excess of 90 mph (140 km/h), or with "moving" pitches such as the curveball and the knuckleball, it is often difficult for an umpire to judge whether a ball went through the strike zone based solely on watching the ball, particularly at the boundaries of the strike zone. Consequently, umpires sometimes unofficially use the catcher's position and/or movement to help judge whether a pitch is a strike. Framing is a catcher's attempt to use this to his team's advantage. For example, on a pitch near the boundary of the strike zone, a catcher might move his mitt a short, subtle distance toward the strike zone within a split second after catching the ball, with the hope that the umpire will call a strike even if it did not go through the strike zone. Conversely, a pitch near the top of the strike zone might be called a ball if the catcher has to rise from his crouched position to catch it, even if it did go through the defined strike zone. Sabermetricians have developed metrics for how well catchers perform in framing pitches.

=== free baseball ===
Slang for extra innings. The fans get to see extra innings "for free".

=== free foot ===
The pitcher's foot which is not required to be in contact with the pitcher's plate. This foot will correspond with the pitcher's glove hand.

=== free pass ===
A base on balls. "Free" because the batter does not have to hit the ball to get on base. Also referred to as a "free ticket" and an Annie Oakley.

=== freeze the hitter ===
To throw a strike that is so unexpected or in such a location that the batter doesn't swing at it. "As Cashman spoke, Pettitte fired a strike on the corner, which froze the hitter." "But the right-hander reached in her bag of tricks and threw a tantalizing changeup that froze the hitter for the final out."

=== friendly confines ===
A nickname for Wrigley Field, home of the Chicago Cubs.

=== frozen rope ===
A hard-hit line drive. Also a strong throw from the outfield.

=== full count ===
A count of 3 balls and 2 strikes; another strike will result in a strikeout, while another ball will result in a walk. At that point, only a foul ball will extend the plate appearance.

=== full house ===
- Three of a kind (three balls), and two of a kind (two strikes): a full count. From the term used in poker. Sometimes called full boat. Instead of holding up fingers indicating the count, the umpire may hold up closed fists, implying "full".
- Capacity crowd; all seats filled in the stadium. From the theatrical term.

=== fungo ===
A fly ball hit for fielders to practice catching. It is not part of the game, but is accomplished by a batter tossing the ball a short distance up in the air and then batting it himself.

=== fungo bat ===
A lightweight bat with a long, skinny barrel used to hit fungoes. It is not a legal or safe bat to use in a game or even in practice with a live pitcher, because it is too light.

== G ==
=== gamer ===
A player who plays particularly hard (especially with a willingness to sacrifice his body for the play) and is prone to making the right play at the right time, often in big games. Also used to refer to an excellent piece of equipment, such as a glove or mitt.

=== gap ===
The space between outfielders. Also alley. A ball hit in the gap is sometimes called a flapper or a gapper. "When they need a gapper, he hits a gapper. When they need a homer, he hits a homer."

=== gap hitter ===
Hits with power up the alleys and tends to get a lot of doubles. A doubles hitter.

=== gas ===
A fastball. "Give him [the batter] the gas"; as in stepping on a car's gas pedal to accelerate.

=== gascan ===
A pitcher who gives up runs in bunches or in untimely situations. Named as such because he'd be pouring gas over a fire.

=== gate receipts ===
The gross ticket prices paid by all the customers who passed through the entrance gates for a game or a series. Also referred to simply as "the gate". "There's a big gate awaiting the champions ..."

=== GEDP ===
Abbreviation for game ending double play.

=== general manager ===
The general manager (GM) runs the organization of a baseball team (personnel, finance, and operations). Normally distinct from the field manager and the club owner.

=== gem ===
A very well pitched game, almost always a win, in which the pitcher allows few if any hits and at most a run or two. Headline: "Mulder Shakes Off Injury to Pitch Gem".

=== get a good piece of it ===
When swinging a round bat at a round ball, the batter hopes to hit the ball solidly in the center. When he does, he's said to "get a good piece of the ball". "'When you hit in the middle of the order, those are the situations you want', said Cabrera, who leads the major leagues with 116 RBIs. 'He threw me a fastball, and I got a good piece of it.'"

=== getaway day ===
getaway day (or getaway game) refers to the last game of a regular season series (usually on a Wednesday, Thursday, or Sunday afternoon) that sees the visiting team leave town ("get away") in the evening after its conclusion, either for the next stop on their road trip or for home. May also refer to the last day of a team's home stand. "MLB's new labor deal requires earlier start times on getaway days."

=== getaway day lineup ===
A starting lineup for a getaway day that features backup players. Usually assembled by a manager to prioritize starters' rest over chances of winning the game; considerations such as the team's standing in the pennant race may prevent such a decision. "The San Francisco Giants completed a four-game sweep of the Colorado Rockies, even with a getaway day lineup taking the field."

=== get on one's horse ===
When a fielder (usually an outfielder) runs extremely fast towards a hard hit ball in an effort to catch it.

=== get good wood ===
To hit a ball hard. A batter who "gets good wood on the ball" or who "gets some lumber on the ball" hits it hard.

=== get off the schneid ===
To break a scoreless, hitless, or winless streak (i.e., a schneid). According to the Dickson Baseball Dictionary, the term "schneid" comes to baseball via gin rummy, and in turn comes from German / Yiddish "schneider", one who cuts cloth, i.e., a tailor.

=== GIDP ===
Statistical abbreviation for grounded into double play.

=== glove ===
- A baseball glove or mitt is a large padded leather glove that players on the defensive team wear to assist them in catching and fielding. Different positions require different shapes and sizes of gloves. The term "mitt" is officially reserved to describe the catcher's mitt and the first-baseman's mitt. By rule, fielders other than the first-baseman and the catcher can wear only conventional gloves (with individual finger slots), not mitts. There is no rule requiring fielders to wear a glove or mitt, but the nature of the game makes it necessary. A fielder may have to catch a ball bare-handed, if he loses his glove in pursuit of a ball or finds himself at the wrong angle to use it.
- Most batters nowadays wear leather batting gloves to improve their grip and provide a small amount of padding. Base-stealing artists, especially those who practice the head-first hands-first slide, wear specialized sliding gloves.
- Players generally keep batting and sliding gloves in their pants pockets when not in use, and their fielding gloves in the dugout. At one time, players would leave their fielding gloves on the field; later they carried them in their pants pockets. This illustrates (1) how much larger and baggier uniforms were and (2) how much smaller the gloves were. The adage "two hands while you're learning" was a necessity in the early years, when gloves simply absorbed shock. The glove has since evolved into a much more effective "trap", and one-hand catches are now the norm.
- Jokes used in movies and cartoons notwithstanding, the rules forbid throwing the glove to "catch", slow down, or even touch a batted ball. When the umpire calls it, the batter is awarded an automatic triple (meaning all runners ahead of him are allowed to score freely); it is also a live ball, and the batter-runner can try for home. Similarly, it is against the rules to use one's cap as a glove, as "All the Way Mae" (Madonna) did in A League of Their Own. Note that it is only against the rules to actually touch the ball with a thrown glove or other equipment; there is no penalty if the ball is not touched.
- A player who is very skilled at defense is said to have a good glove.

=== GM ===
An abbreviation for general manager.

=== go-ahead run ===
The run which puts a team which was behind or tied into the lead. Used particularly with runners on base (e.g., "The Phillies have Jimmy Rollins and Shane Victorino on base down 4–2; Victorino represents the tying run and Chase Utley is the go-ahead run at the plate.").

=== go deep ===
- To hit a home run. "Richie Sexson and Kenji Johjima also went deep for the Mariners."
- A starting pitcher who pitches past the 6th inning is said to "go deep into the game". "Against the White Sox on Thursday, Morrow's command wasn't there. He walked six batters in 5 2/3 innings, and despite coming one out shy of recording a quality start, he didn't prove yet he's able to pitch deep into games."

=== go down in order ===
- When the defending team allows no opponent on base in a half-inning, thereby retiring the side facing the minimum three batters, the batting team is said to have gone down in order, the defending team is said to have retired it in order.

=== go quietly ===
- When a team fails to mount a strong offense, such as going 1–2–3 in an inning, it may be said to have "gone quietly". "Outside of a walk to Mantle after Tresh's clout and a ninth-inning single by Pepitone, the Yankees went quietly the rest of the way."
- A player who retires without a lot of fanfare or complaining may be said to "go quietly".

=== go the distance ===
See go the route.

=== go the route ===
A pitcher who throws a complete game "goes the route".

=== go yard ===
To "go yard" is to hit a home run, i.e., to hit the ball the length of the baseball field or "ball yard".

=== going bridge ===
One more way to say "hit a home run".

=== gold glove ===
The major league player chosen as the best in his league at fielding his position is given a Gold Glove Award.

=== golden sombrero ===
One who strikes out four times in one game is said to have gotten a "golden sombrero". Three strike outs is called the "hat trick", while the rare five strike outs is called the "platinum sombrero." Only eight times has a player struck out six times in a game; this is called the "horn" (named by Mike Flanagan after Sam Horn who did this in 1991), "double-platinum sombrero," or "titanium sombrero." If it ever happens, Flanagan said a seven-strikeout game shall be called "Horn-A-Plenty."

=== golfing ===
Swinging at an obviously low pitch, particularly one in the dirt. Also used to describe actual contact with a pitch low in the zone.

=== gone ===
- A home run. Announcer: "That ball is gone."
- Conversely, a batter who has just been struck out, especially by a power pitcher, as in "He gone!"
- An announcer may simply announce "one gone" or "two gone" to indicate how many outs have been made in the inning; likewise "one away" and "two away".

=== Good afternoon/morning, good evening, and good night ===
Striking out on three consecutive pitches. A common call from the pitcher's team announcers when it happens.

=== good eye ===
A hitter who has excellent awareness of the strike zone, and is able to lay off pitches that are barely out of the strike zone, is said to have a "good eye", "Ortiz and Ramirez are a constant threat, whether it's swinging the bats or taking pitches", Cleveland third baseman Casey Blake said. "They have a couple of the best swings in the game and a couple of the best eyes in the game ..."

=== good hit, no field ===
Said to have been the world's shortest scouting report, and often quoted in reference to sluggers such as Dick Stuart and Dave Kingman, who were notoriously poor fielders.

=== good piece of hitting ===
A situation where a batter puts the ball in play in a way that maximizes the result for his team. "Good pieces of hitting" tend to result in runs scoring and draining several pitches out of an opposing pitcher, especially in situations where the pitcher's team was looking for a decent amount of length.

=== good take ===
An accolade given to a batter who does not swing at a pitch that is close to, but not in, the strike zone; most often said to a batter with two strikes (who is naturally tempted).

=== Goodbye Mr. Spalding! ===
Exclamation by a broadcaster when a batter hits a home run. First uttered by an unknown broadcaster in the film The Natural. Spalding is a major manufacturer of baseballs.

=== goose egg ===
When a team has zero on the scoreboard.

=== gopher ball ===
A gopher ball (or gopher pitch) is a pitch that leads to a home run, one the batter will "go for". Illustration from an on-line chat: "He was always that guy who'd go in and throw the gopher pitch in the first inning and he'd be two down." A game in which several home runs are hit by both teams may also be described as "gopher ball".

=== got a piece of it ===
When a batter hits a foul ball or foul tip, perhaps surviving a two strike count and remaining at bat, a broadcaster may say "He got a piece of it."

=== got him ===
Short for "got him out".

=== got to him early ===
When a team's batters gets several hits and runs off of the opposing starting pitcher in early innings the batters are said to "get to him early".

=== got under the ball ===
When a hitter swings slightly under the center of the pitched ball, thereby leading to a high fly ball out instead of a home run, he's said to "get under the ball".

=== grab some pine ===
Go sit on the bench, used as a taunt after a strikeout. Popularized by Giants sportscaster Mike Krukow.

=== grand slam ===
Home run hit with the bases loaded. A "grand salami" or a "grand ol' ding dong".

=== grandstand play ===
Showing off for the fans in the grandstands. Also called grandstanding. Not only players, but managers, owners, and politicians often play to the crowd to raise their public image. An example: "Tellem weighed in with a thoughtful back-page article in this Sunday's New York Times regarding the recent Congressional and mainstream media grandstanding over steroids."

=== granny ===
A grand slam. "Torii Hunter's game-winning grand slam was his 10th career granny and third career walk-off homer."

=== Grapefruit League ===
The group of Major League teams that conduct Spring Training in Florida, where grapefruit trees grow in abundance.

=== great seats ===
A sarcastic term for seats high in the bleachers, a long way from the playing field. The phrase was popularized by Bob Uecker in a series of TV commercials.

=== green light ===
Permission from the manager for a batter or runner to be aggressive. Examples include permission for the batter to swing away on a 3–0 count or for a runner to steal a base. An example: "Instead of the bunt sign, Tigers manager Jim Leyland gave Rodríguez the green light and he hit a three-run homer off Riske to give the Tigers a 3–2 win over Kansas City on Sunday."

=== green monster ===
- The Green Monster is a popular nickname for the 37.2 feet (11.3 m) high left field wall at Fenway Park, home to the Boston Red Sox baseball team. The wall is 310 feet (94.5 m) from home plate and is a popular target for right-handed hitters. The seats on top of the Monster, installed for the 2003 season, are among the most coveted seats at Fenway.
- The Red Sox have spring training at JetBlue Park at Fenway South (informally, JetBlue Park) in Fort Myers, Florida. JetBlue is an exact copy of Fenway, including a full-sized Green Monster.
- The Red Sox' mascot is "Wally, the Green Monster".

=== groove a pitch ===
When a pitcher throws a pitch down the middle of the plate ("the groove"). The result may be predictable. An example: "But in the third, with two out and a man at second and the Cards ahead 2–1, Verlander grooved a pitch that Pujols clobbered for a home run."

=== ground ball ===
A hit that bounces in the infield. Also grounder. A bunt is not considered a ground ball.

=== ground ball with eyes ===
A ground ball that barely gets between two infielders for a base hit, seeming to "see" the only spot where it would be unfieldable. Also seeing-eye grounder, or seeing-eye single.

=== ground ball pitcher ===
A pitcher who tends to induce more ground balls than fly balls. Often a manager will bring a ground ball pitcher in as a relief pitcher when there are men on base and less than two outs, hoping the next batter hits a grounder into a double play.

=== ground-rule double ===
Under standard ground rules, there are conditions under which a batter is awarded second base automatically. If a ball hit in fair territory bounces over a wall or fence (or gets caught in the ivy at Wrigley Field) without being touched by a fielder, it will likely be declared a double. If a ball hit into fair territory is touched by a fan, the batter is awarded an extra base.

=== ground rules ===
Rules specific to a particular ballpark (or grounds) due to unique features of the park and where the standard baseball rules may be inadequate.

=== guess hitter ===
A hitter who primarily guesses what type of pitch is coming and where it will be located as their approach to hitting rather than just looking for a fastball and then reacting to off speed pitches.

=== gun ===
- A strong arm. Also, a cannon.
- To throw hard. Announcer (following a grounder and throw to first): "Guillen guns and gets him."

=== gun down ===
To throw out a runner. "Valentin was erased when he tried to steal second, though, and Posada gunned him down."

=== gyroball ===
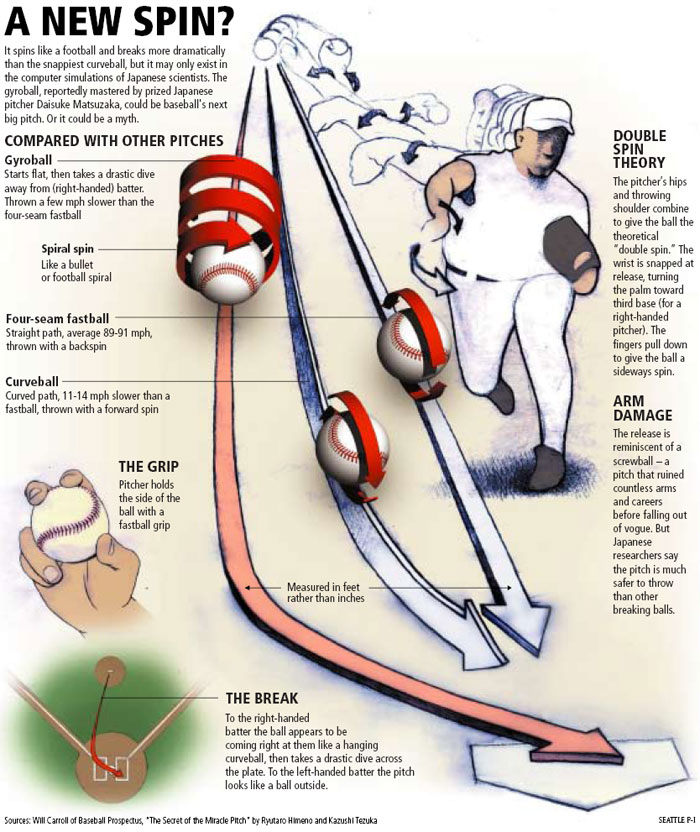
Illustration of a gyroball illustrating the sharp breaking motion

A type of curveball with a severe break. Boston Red Sox pitcher Daisuke Matsuzaka is said to throw a gyroball. It was designed by a couple of Japanese scientists to reduce arm fatigue in pitchers. The result was a way to throw the ball with an extreme break. Whether such a special pitch really exists remains the subject of great controversy among experts of various pedigrees.

== H ==
=== hack ===
To swing awkwardly at the ball. "As his son stood in the batter's box and hacked away, Wolpert came up with the idea of opening his own batting cage in Manhattan." Sometimes said of an aggressive hitter who would swing at any pitch within reach, whether high, low, inside, or outside. "An unrepentant free swinger who hacked at anything in the same area code as the strike zone, Puckett drew just 23 walks that year."

=== Hall of Fame ===
The Baseball Hall of Fame in Cooperstown, New York. Abbreviated HOF. In popular usage, the terms "Hall of Fame broadcaster" and "Hall of Fame writer" are often used to describe recipients of two annual awards, respectively the Ford C. Frick Award and J. G. Taylor Spink Award. Recipients of these awards are recognized in dedicated Hall exhibits, but are not considered actual Hall of Fame members.

=== Hall of Very Good ===
A tongue-in-cheek expression used to refer to players who had successful careers, but whose stats and/or overall performance are not good enough to put them into consideration for the Hall of Fame. Example of players said to be in the "Hall of Very Good" are Chris Carpenter, Lee Smith (who eventually earned Hall of Fame induction), and Mark McGwire.

=== hammer ===
- To hit the ball hard, typically for extra bases. "Aaron hammered that pitch."
- The nickname of Henry Aaron—Hank "The Hammer" Aaron—second all-time in Major League career home runs.
- A curve ball, usually of the 12 to 6 variety.

=== handcuff ===
- A hard-hit ground ball that bounces directly at an infielder is difficult for him to get his hands on – he appears to have been handcuffed.
- A pitch thrown high and inside "handcuffs" a batter because he can't get his hands far enough away from his body to swing the bat.

=== handle ===
Often it's said of a player who has not fielded a batted ball cleanly that he "couldn't find the handle on it". This suggests the fanciful notion that a baseball would be easier to hold onto if it had a handle.

=== hang ===
- A breaking ball that does not "break", or change direction, and so is easy to hit. A hanging curveball.
- A pitcher may be hung with a loss if he is responsible for his team falling behind in runs and the team never recovers the lead.
- A runner may be hung up if he is caught in a rundown.
- A runner may be hung out to dry if he gets picked off at first base, or if a hitter misses a hit-and-run sign and the runner is easily tagged out at second base. A player may be hung out to dry if his team treats him in an unexpected or disappointing way. (Story: "The Mets got what they needed from pitcher Al Leiter yesterday. Unfortunately, Leiter was hung out to dry again, done in by his team's anemic offense.")
- A team may hang a (number) on the opposing pitcher or his team by scoring that many runs. May use a literal number or an informal term such as a crooked number or a snowman.

=== happy ===
When a pitcher uses a particular type of pitch so much that he becomes less effective, he's sometimes said to be "happy" with the pitch – fastball happy or curveball happy, for example. "This article is a response, in part, to a Boston Globe sports rumor asserting that Josh Beckett has become 'Curveball Happy' and has changed his release point."

=== hard hands ===
A tendency to mishandle fielded balls. Also stone fingers. Contrast soft hands.

=== hardball ===
Baseball, as opposed to softball.

=== hat trick ===
To strike out three times. Used jokingly, as the same term means to score three times in hockey and other sports. This term is also used to indicate someone who has hit three home runs in a game.

=== HBP ===
Hit By Pitch.

=== head of lettuce ===
When a player breaks their bat after hitting the pitch, and the main portion of the bat (the barrel) lands within the infield, the broken portion can splinter into many pieces. (If the barrel lands either in foul territory or outside the established infield, the event is not a head of lettuce.) The term pays homage to other food-related baseball terms such as "can of corn", "high cheese", "in a pickle", etc. The original use of the term dates to 2006 when Joshua Githens first noted the likeness to striking a head of lettuce with the bat. "That bat exploded like a head of lettuce!"

=== headhunter ===
A pitcher who has a reputation for throwing beanballs.

=== heart of the plate ===
Middle of home plate. "Looking to go up the ladder, Hughes instead missed right over the heart of the plate just below belt high with a 95-mph fastball. As good hitters do, Vladimir Guerrero made him pay with a single up the middle."

=== heat ===
Also heater. A fastball.

=== heavy hitter ===
A power hitter. A player who hits a lot of home runs or other extra-base hits. A batter with a high slugging percentage. A slugger. A term shared with the sport of boxing, referring to a fighter who scores a large number of knockouts.

=== help his own cause ===
Said of a pitcher who knocks in runs as a hitter, thereby helping himself to earn credit for a win.

=== herky-jerky ===
A pitcher with an unusual or awkward wind-up or motion, as if he's not in full control of his legs and arms, may be said to have a herky-jerky motion.

=== hesitation pitch ===
A pitcher who pauses in his wind-up, perhaps at the top of the wind-up, may be said to have a hesitation pitch. If this is part of his regular motion, it may be effective in throwing off the timing of the batter. If it's an occasional motion and used when there are runners on base, the pitcher is at risk of being called for a balk.

=== hidden ball trick ===
A very rare feat in which a fielder has the ball and hides it from a runner, tricking him into believing some other fielder has it or that it has gotten away from them. (There is no rule against such deception except that once the pitcher toes or stands astride the rubber, he must have the ball in his possession or else a balk will be called.) Any baserunner so victimized will be ribbed endlessly by his teammates for having been caught napping.

=== high and tight ===
A location pitch thrown above the strike zone and close to the batter.

=== high cheese ===
A fastball thrown high in the strike zone.

=== high hard one ===
A fastball thrown high in, or above the strike zone.

=== high heat ===
A strike thrown high in the strike zone.

=== high let it fly; low let it go ===
An adage about batting against a knuckleball pitcher. Fluttering knuckleballs are notoriously hard to hit, especially low in the strike zone.

=== hill ===
The pitcher's mound.

=== hit ===
- The act of safely reaching first base after batting the ball into fair territory. Abbreviated as H, this meaning is synonymous with base hit. See also single, double, triple, home run, extra-base hit, error, fielder's choice.
- The act of contacting the ball with the bat. "The batter hit the ball right at the second baseman."
- When a batter is touched by a pitch. See hit by pitch
- The term sacrifice hit is used by scorekeepers to indicate a sacrifice bunt. It is typically an out, not a base hit (unless the batter beats the throw to first without benefit of an error).

=== hit a bullet ===
To hit the ball very hard, typically a line drive.

=== hit and run ===
An offensive tactic whereby a baserunner (usually on first base) starts running as if to steal and the batter is obligated to swing at the pitch to try to drive the ball behind the runner to right field. Contrast this to a run and hit, where the runner steals, and the batter (who would normally take on a straight steal) may swing at the pitch.

=== hit away ===
After a batter has attempted but failed to lay down a bunt, or in a situation in which he might ordinarily be expected to bunt, he may instead make a normal swing at the ball on the next pitch. In such a case he is said to "hit away" or "swing away". "Smoltz swung away, fouling it off for strike one. Knowing that the bunt had been given away on the first pitch, Braves manager Bobby Cox took off the bunt sign this time."

=== hit behind the runner ===
An offensive tactic where the batter intentionally puts the ball in play to the right side (the first base side) with a runner on second. The intent is to advance the baserunner to third, where a sacrifice fly by the next hitter can score a run.

=== hit by pitch ===
- When a pitch touches a batter in the batter's box, the batter advances to first base. If the pitch hits him while he is swinging (striking) he is not awarded a base, and if the umpire feels he made no effort to avoid getting hit he simply calls a ball.
- Colloquially, a batter who is hit by a pitch has been plunked, drilled, nailed, plugged, or beaned.

=== hit 'em where they ain't ===
Said to be the (grammatically casual) response of turn-of-the-20th-century player Willie Keeler to the question, "What's the secret to hitting?" in which "'em" or "them" are the batted balls, and "they" are the fielders.

=== hit for average ===
Contrary to what might be literally implied, a player who "hits for average" is one who achieves a high batting average.

=== hit for the cycle ===
When a given player hits a single, double, triple and home run in the same game. To accomplish this feat in order is termed a "natural cycle". Hitting for the cycle is a rare enough occurrence that Major League Baseball keeps special statistics on it.

=== hit it where the grass don't grow ===
Hit the ball into the stands for a home run.

=== hit on Christmas Day ===
When a player seems to have a natural aptitude to get hits in all situations. "Magglio can hit Christmas Day", Tigers manager Jim Leyland said. "It's an old saying, and he's one of those guys who can. There's nothing fancy. He sees it, hits it and does it pretty damned good."

=== hit parade ===
A rapid succession of hits within the same inning or a high total of hits throughout a game.

=== hit the ball on the screws ===
To hit the ball even center with measured force, often resulting in a loud crack of the bat. A slumping batter might be comforted by "hitting the ball on the screws" when not getting a hit. The phrase derives from golf, referring to a well executed shot. Back when "woods" were actually made of wood, manufacturers screwed a plastic insert into the club face as a safeguard against premature wear. When a golfer hit a good shot he would say, "I hit it on the screws." Another source is the fact that early baseball bats usually cracked lengthwise into two pieces; many were repaired using glue and two screws. (Such repairs are now illegal.)

=== hit the deck ===
When a batter drops or dives to the ground to avoid being hit by a pitch. "The third kind of pitch is the one that is coming right at your head. This one you don't even have time to think about. Some part of you sees the ball as it leaves the pitcher's hand, and something about the fact that the ball is coming straight toward your eye makes it almost disappear into a blind spot. You hit the deck before you even know you've done it."

=== hit the dirt ===
To slide. Sometimes used also as equivalent to hit the deck.

=== hitch in his swing ===
When a batter does not swing the bat in a single motion – perhaps he lifts the bat or moves his hands or hesitates before swinging – he may be said to have a "hitch in his swing". Having a hitch may slow down how quickly or powerfully he swings at the pitch. "All winter, Green worked on eliminating a hitch from his swing. He did it by setting up a video camera at a batting cage near his home in Irvine, California, taping swing after swing, and comparing it with video from his days with the Los Angeles Dodgers."

=== hitter ===
Batter.

a person who hits a ball with a bat in baseball.

=== hitter's count ===
When a batter is way ahead in the count (3–0, 3–1) he's likely to anticipate that the next pitch will be thrown for a strike. See count.

=== hitter's park ===
- A baseball park in which hitters tend to perform better than average. This may be a result of several factors, including the dimensions of the park (distance to the outfield fences, size of foul territory behind the plate and down the lines), prevailing winds, temperature and relative humidity, and altitude. Whether a park is a hitter's park or a pitcher's park (in which hitters perform worse than average) is determined statistically by measuring Park Factors, which involves comparing how well hitters perform in a given park compared with how they perform in all other parks. This measure is regularly reported and updated for Major League Baseball parks by ESPN.com. Baseball Reference and other baseball research organizations also report park factors for major league parks. Baseball Prospectus and other baseball researchers calculate park factors for minor league parks to help in adjusting the statistics of baseball prospects.
- Whether a park is a hitter's park or pitcher's park may change from day to day. For example, when the wind is blowing "out" at Wrigley Field, it is typically rendered a "hitter's park", and a double-digit score for one or both teams is not unusual.
- On the other hand, some are hitter's parks, any and all other factors notwithstanding. Atlanta–Fulton County Stadium, Braves home field from 1966 to 1996, was known as The Launching Pad.

=== hitterish ===
A physical and/or mental state where a player is seeing pitches well and his timing is on, so that observers or the player himself feel he has a good chance at getting a hit. Often used by players and sportscasters. "It's like Charley Lau used to tell us, used to tell me: 'You look very hitterish up there. You look hitterish, you look like you're going to hit the ball hard'", Brett said in camp.

=== hold ===
- A hold (abbreviated as H) is awarded to a relief pitcher if he enters in a save situation, records at least one out, and leaves the game without having relinquished that lead. To receive a hold, the pitcher must not finish the game (thus becoming the closing pitcher) or be the winning pitcher.
- Unlike saves, more than one pitcher can earn a hold in a game. It is also not necessary for the pitcher's team to win the game in order to achieve a hold; they merely have to be in the lead at the time the pitcher exits.
- The hold was invented in 1986 to give credit to non-closer relief pitchers. Holds are most often accredited to setup pitchers, as they usually pitch between the starter and the closer. Holds are not an official Major League Baseball statistic, but are recognized by MLB in its rules.

=== hold the runner on ===
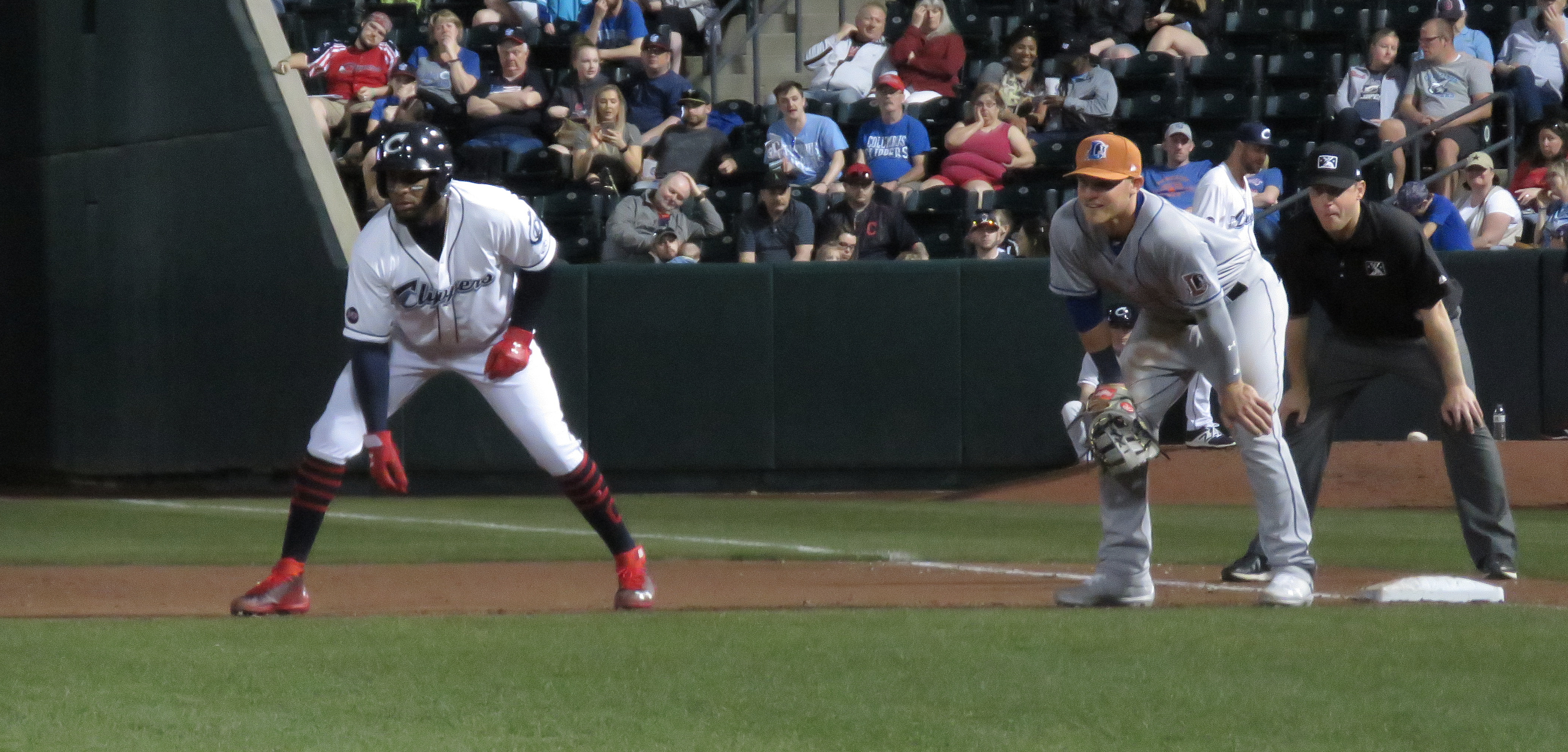
Jake Bauers (right) holding Yandy Díaz on at first base

When a runner is on first base, the first baseman might choose to stand very close to first base rather than assume a position behind first base and more part-way toward second base (a position better suited to field ground balls hit to the right side of the diamond). When he does this he's said to "hold the runner on (first)" because he's in a position to take a throw from the pitcher and thereby discourage the runner from taking a big lead-off.

=== hold up on a swing ===
When a batter begins to swing the bat at a pitch but stops swinging before the bat makes contact with the ball or the bat passes the front of the plate, he may be said to "hold up on his swing".

=== hole ===
- One of the nine places in the batting lineup. The leadoff hitter in the first inning is the player in the "one hole". In the four hole, the cleanup hitter is hoping to get to the plate in that inning.
- Also see #in the hole.

=== hole in his glove ===
A tendency to drop fly balls, usually after they hit (and seem to go through) the fielder's glove.

=== hole in his swing ===
A scouting report phrase describing a batter who can't hit strikes in a particular location. "Howard became a star after fixing a hole in his swing."

=== hole in the lineup ===
A team that has one or more weak hitters in its 9-person batting order has a "hole in the lineup" that opposition teams can take advantage of. "There are no holes in that lineup, so to say you're going to pitch around one batter might not be the best thing." "If the team that Shapiro has constructed is going to overtake the Boston Red Sox, the New York Yankees or any of the other contenders in the American League, it can't afford another season with a hole in the middle of the lineup that Hafner was from May through the playoffs last season."

=== home ===
Home plate. For a runner to reach home safely is to score a run. Getting a runner who is on base home is the goal of any batter.

=== home cooking ===
- When a player for the home team gets a favorable or generous call from the official scorer, the players may refer to the scorer's call as "home cooking". For example, the scorer may credit a batter for a base hit on a batted ball that a fielder bobbled briefly and then failed to make a putout.
- "Home cooking" is sometimes used synonymously with home field advantage. The reference may be to the home team having the advantage of living at home, not just to being able to play in its own stadium.

=== home advantage/home field advantage ===
Teams playing home games have a small advantage over visiting teams. In recent decades, home teams have tended to win about 53.5% of their games. Because teams play the same number of games at home as they do away during the regular season, this advantage tends to even out. In play-off series, however, teams hope to gain from home-field advantage by having the first game of the series played in their home stadium.

=== home game/home team ===
A game played at the home stadium or ballpark of a baseball club. When the Yankees play in Yankee Stadium, they're playing a home game. The team hosting the game is referred to as the home team. In rare instances, the home team plays in a stadium not their own. In 2005, the Houston Astros played a "home" series against the Chicago Cubs at Miller Park in Milwaukee, home of the Brewers, because their home stadium, Minute Maid Park, was rendered temporarily unusable because of Hurricane Rita. In 2010, the Toronto Blue Jays played a "home" series against the Philadelphia Phillies at the Phillies' home park, Citizens Bank Park, because of security concerns due to the G-20 summit being held in Toronto. Despite being in Philadelphia, the Blue Jays wore their home white uniforms and batted last. Also, despite Citizens Bank Park being a National League field, the designated hitter was used in the series.

=== home half ===
The second (bottom) half of an inning, in which the home team is at bat.

=== home plate ===
See also plate.

=== home run ===
A home run (or homer) is a base hit in which the batter is able to circle all the bases, ending at home plate and scoring a run himself.

=== home run derby ===
A batting competition in which the object is to hit the most home runs. The 1960 television series Home Run Derby featured such a competition. The term can also be used to refer to a game during which many home runs are hit. The term was first used in the 1920s to refer to the race ("derby") between batters to lead their league in home runs for the season.

Since 1985, Major League Baseball has hosted an annual Home Run Derby, and the Chinese Professional Baseball League (CPBL) has done so since 1992. At least one minor league, the Southern League, has also held a home run derby. In 2007, the Israel Baseball League played seven-inning games, and if the teams were tied at the end of the seventh inning the tie was broken by use of a home run derby. A number of amusement parks, entertainment centers and batting cages offer a home run derby type competition. Since 2022, a three-player home run derby shootout is used to determine the winner of the All-Star Game in case of a tie.

=== home run trot ===
- When a batter, realizing the ball he just hit is about become a home run, slows from a run to a celebratory trot. "Well, I've been saying it all year, and it finally happened tonight: David Ortiz became the first player in the 2010 season to take more than 30-seconds to trot around the bases after a home run. With four of the top five slowest home run trots of the year already - all four of which were clocked in at 28.95 seconds or slower - it seemed inevitable that he would be the first to break the half-minute barrier."
- Sometimes a player mistakenly slows down, however, when the wind or a superb play by an outfielder, turns a home run into a double or single off the outfield wall, or to a long out, or to another odd outcome, as the following case illustrates:

Unfortunately for his personal power totals, Milledge was bamboozled into believing his liner in the fourth inning against the Chicago Cubs on Thursday night had cleared the left-field fence at PNC Park for his first career grand slam. Dead certain he had gone deep, Milledge raised his fist rounding first base, put his head down and went into a trot. Cool. Double-dog certain because the fireworks guy at PNC set off the pyrotechnics that explode every time a Bucs player goes deep. Music also began to blare. What a glorious moment for the Bucs! ... only, the ball had not cleared the fence. It hit the top and stayed in the field of play. As Bucs announcer Bob Walk said, "Uh oh, uh oh, uh oh, uh oh—we got a problem here." Milledge was not quite midway between second and third base when he realized the Cubs had him in a rundown. And, yeah, um, he was tagged out. Score that a two-run double and a big ol' base-running blunder.

=== home stand ===
A series of home games. See also road trip.

=== home team ===
The "home team" is the one in whose stadium the game is played against the "visiting team". The home team has the advantage of batting in the second or bottom half of the inning. In case a game is played at a neutral site, the "home" team is usually determined by coin toss.

=== homer ===
- A home run.
- A derisive term for a dedicated, almost delusional, fan. Especially used for a broadcaster, in any sport, whose team "can do no wrong"; for example, they might argue a bad strike call, but say nothing about one against the opponent. Johnny Most of the Boston Celtics and Hawk Harrelson of the Chicago White Sox were notorious "homers." In a somewhat more humorous example, Bert Wilson used to say, "I don't care who wins, as long as it's the Cubs!" A common "homer" saying is, "My two favorite teams are (my team) and whoever's playing (my team's rival)."

=== hook ===
- When a manager leaves the dugout with the obvious intention of replacing the pitcher with a reliever, he may be said to be carrying a hook. "Here comes Sparky, and he's got the hook." Such a usage may have come from the large hooks that were sometimes used in Vaudeville to yank unsuccessful acts off the stage if they were reluctant to leave on their own. When he was manager of the Cincinnati Reds, Sparky Anderson's heavy reliance on relief pitching earned him the nickname "Captain Hook", a reference both to the standard usage and to the Peter Pan villain.
- A pitcher is said to be "on the hook" when he leaves the game with his team behind because of runs that he gave up—a hook on which he may be hung with the loss.
- A curveball.

=== hook foul ===
When the batter pulls the ball down the line, starting fair but ending foul, resulting in a foul ball. See also slice foul.

=== hopper ===
A batted ball that takes several bounces in the infield, or a single "high hop" after it hits the ground just in front of home plate. Also see "short hop".

=== horsehide ===
- The ball (a baseball) used in the game of baseball.
- The leather cover on the baseball (which is now usually made of cowhide, not horsehide). A slugger may be said to "knock the horsehide off the ball". Horsehide was the cover of choice for decades, as it was less prone to stretching than cowhide. This was necessary in part because in the early days, they tried to play the entire game with a single ball, or as few as possible. That became moot in the 1920s, but horsehide continued to be used until the 1980s or so, when horsehide became prohibitively expensive and cowhide was finally adopted as the standard cover for a baseball.

=== hose ===
A strong arm, said typically of an outfielder. To "be hosed" is to be thrown out on the bases, typically from the outfield.

=== hot ===
A batter who is having a hitting streak or a team having a winning streak is said to be "hot". "'Today was pretty impressive', Scioscia said. 'Hitters, they have their times. When they're hot, they're hot. You can't do anything about it.'"

=== hot box ===
The area between two fielders during a rundown.

=== hot corner ===
The area around third base and the third baseman, so called because right-handed batters tend to hit line drives down the third base line. The third baseman is sometimes called a "cornerman".

=== hot stove league ===
An old fashioned term for a "Winter league" with no games, just speculation, gossip, and story-telling during the months between the end of the World Series and the beginning of Spring training, presumably conducted while sitting around a hot stove. One of Norman Rockwell's well-known baseball paintings is a literal illustration of this term.

=== house by the side of the road ===
A batter who strikes out looking. The term was made popular by legendary Detroit Tigers radio broadcaster Ernie Harwell, who would often say, "He stood there like the house by the side of the road, and watched the ball go by." The phrase originates from the title of a poem by Sam Walter Foss.

=== howitzer ===
A very strong arm. A cannon. A gun. Usually applied to an outfielder. Named after the Howitzer artillery piece. Headline: "Roberto Clemente: A Howitzer for an Arm, An Ocean for a Heart".

=== human rain delay ===
A human rain delay is a derisive term for a player who is very deliberate in his play, such as a pitcher who takes a long time between pitches or a batter who constantly steps out of the batter's box. "The Seattle Mariners will announce a new manager today—Mike Hargrove. Hargrove bears a great nickname—'The Human Rain Delay'. The name stems from the fact that, as a player, Hargrove would take about 15 minutes for every plate appearance. He would step out of the batter's box, fidget with his gloves, his helmet, his pants. He drove the pitcher nuts, but that was his plan."

=== humpback liner ===
A ball hit deep in the infield on a trajectory between those of fly balls and line drives.

=== hurler ===
A pitcher.

=== hustle double ===
When a hitter stretches a likely single into a double.

== I ==
=== ice cream cone ===
See: snow cone.

=== I have it. You get it. ===
A fielding play, usually where a lofty fly ball is to land equidistant between two fielders. Both are unsure who should catch it, usually resulting in last-second leaps or dives. Often neither does, in which case the one who had the better chance is charged with an error.

=== immaculate inning ===
A half-inning in which the pitcher strikes out all three batters he faces with exactly nine pitches.

=== in the batter's eyes ===
A high fastball, usually at or near the batter's eye level. Above the strike zone, so a ball, and hard to hit, but also hard to lay off.

=== infield fly rule ===
- The umpire calls the batter out when the batter hits a fly ball that can be caught with ordinary effort by an infielder in fair territory, and (c) there are runners on first and second, or on first, second, and third. The infield fly rule is not in effect for a bunt or a line drive.
- The definition specifies that a ball need not be caught by an infielder, only that an infielder could have caught the ball using "ordinary effort." The ball does not need to remain in the infield for the infield fly rule to be invoked. The definition specifically states that no arbitrary marking, such as the infield cutout, may be used to determine whether a batted ball is an infield fly.
- The catcher and the pitcher are considered infielders for the purpose of the infield fly rule.
- The batter is automatically called out in this situation whether or not an infielder attempts to catch the fly ball, assuming it stays fair. The rule states that the umpire is supposed to announce, "Infield fly, if fair." If the ball will be almost certainly fair, the umpire will likely yell, "Infield fly, batter's out!" or just "Batter's out!"
- This rule is intended to prevent the fielder from intentionally allowing the ball to drop and getting force outs on the runners on base. :*The rule is a little mystifying to casual fans of the game, but it has been a fundamental rule since 1895, allegedly to prevent the notoriously tricky Baltimore Orioles from intentionally dropping the ball.
- The simplest way to think about it is this: If there is a potential force out at third with fewer than two outs, the infield fly rule is in effect.

=== infielder ===
First baseman, second baseman and third baseman, plus the shortstop, so called because they are positioned on the infield dirt. The pitcher and catcher are typically not considered infielders, but instead as the battery. However, for purposes of implementing the Infield Fly Rule, the catcher, pitcher, and any player stationed in the infield when the pitch is delivered are included as infielders.

=== inherited runner ===
The runner or runners on base when a relief pitcher enters the game. Since a previous pitcher has allowed these runners to reach base (or was simply pitching when the runners reached base, such as in the case of a fielding error), any inherited runners who score when the relief pitcher is pitching are charged to the previous pitcher's runs allowed and/or earned runs allowed total, depending on how each runner reached base. Modern box scores list how many runners each relief pitcher inherits (if any), and how many of those inherited runners the relief pitcher allows to score, called inherited runs allowed (IRA).

=== in jeopardy ===
In general, a baserunner is in jeopardy at any time the ball is live and the baserunner is not touching a base, except in the cases of overrunning first base on a fair ball or advancing to an awarded base, e.g., on a base on balls or hit by pitch. A baserunner who is in jeopardy may be putout by a fielder at any time.

=== injured list ===
Major league teams may remove injured players from their active roster temporarily by placing them on the injured list. Another player can then be called up as a replacement during this time.

=== inning ===
An inning consists of two halves. In each half, one team bats until three outs are made. A full inning consists of six outs, three for each team; and a regulation game consists of nine innings. The first half-inning is called the top half of the inning; the second half-inning, the bottom half. The break between the top and bottom halves is called the middle of the inning. The visiting team is on offense during the top half of the inning, the home team is on offense during the bottom half. Sometimes the bottom half is also referred to as the home half.

=== innings eater ===
A pitcher who may or may not be a starter or a closer but who can be relied on to pitch several innings either to keep his team in contention or sometimes when the game is no longer close, is an "innings eater". Headline: "Appetites never diminish for 'innings-eating' pitchers".

The success of most pitchers is based on statistics such as won-loss record, ERA or saves, but the unsung "innings eater" is judged by how many innings he pitches and the impact his work has on the rest of the staff. "I don't have a whole lot of goals going into the season. I don't shoot for a certain ERA or a certain strikeout number or certain number of wins," says Blanton, entering his second full season. "I try to go out and get a quality start every time, six innings or more, and not miss any starts. I feel if I can do that, I'll get my 200 innings in a year and everything else falls into place with that."

=== inside baseball ===
An offensive strategy that focuses on teamwork and good execution. It usually centers on tactics that keep the ball in the infield: walks, base hits, bunts, and stolen bases. This was the primary offensive strategy during the dead-ball era. Inside baseball is also a common metaphor in American politics to describe background machinations. The equivalent modern term is small ball.

=== inside pitching ===
A tactic used by pitchers which involves throwing a pitch close to the batter to make it more difficult to swing their bat, and result in making less solid contact.

=== inside the ball ===
Proper mechanics of a baseball swing, in which the hitter rotates his body while keeping his hands and the bat close to his body, with the bat coming across the plate after the body has almost fully rotated 90 degrees from his initial stance. Sometimes the phrase used is that the hitter "keeps his hands inside the baseball", and sometimes that the hitter himself "keeps inside the ball" – never mind the connotation of a player's literally being inside a baseball. "He's staying inside the ball so good, man", Dunn said. "For big guys like us, that's a hard thing to do. You always want to get the head [of the bat] out. His right hand is staying inside, so good. That's why he's able to hit the ball to left, to center, to right. He's in a good place right now."

=== inside-out swing ===
When the batter swings at a pitch with his hands ahead of the end of the bat. For a right-handed hitter, this often leads to balls being hit toward the right side of the diamond. One of the most famous "inside-out" hitters is Derek Jeter: "While Jeter became known over his two decades for rising to the occasion and delighting fans with his heroics, he was above all a technician, slashing at pitches with his trademark inside-out swing."

=== inside-the-park home run ===
A play where a hitter scores a home run without hitting the ball out of play.

=== insurance run ===
A run scored by a team already in the lead. These surplus runs do not affect the game outcome but serve as "insurance" against the team giving up runs later.

=== intentional pass/intentional walk ===
Additional terms for the intentional base on balls.

=== interference ===
Interference is an infraction where a person illegally changes the course of play from what is expected. Interference might be committed by players on the offense, players not currently in the game, catchers, umpires, or fans; each type of interference is covered differently by the rules.

=== interleague play ===
Regular-season games between teams in different major leagues, which allow natural rivals and crosstown rivals to play each other more often, not just in play-offs.

=== Internet baseball awards ===
While Major League Baseball calls on the Baseball Writers' Association of America (BBWA) to name the most valuable player, rookie of the year, and Cy Young Award winner each year, since 1997 Baseball Prospectus has conducted an on-line poll to make Internet Baseball Awards in those categories as well as manager of the year.

=== interstate ===
A batting average below .200. A player with a batting average of .195 is said to be on I-95, a reference to the numbering on the Interstate Highway System. See also the Mendoza Line.

=== in the books ===
The game is over. Long-time New York Mets radio broadcaster Howie Rose (first on WFAN, now on WOR) ends every Mets win with the catchphrase, "Put it in the books!" (Rose's memoir is entitled Put It In The Book!)

=== in the hole ===
- The spaces between the first baseman and second baseman and between the shortstop and the third baseman, one of the usual places where a ground ball must go for a hit. "Ozzie went deep in the hole" but, despite Ozzie's best effort, the ball "found a hole" through the infield and into the outfield. See also up the middle and down the line.
- Due up to bat after the on-deck batter. Probably derived from boating, where it was originally "in the hold", the place prior to being "on deck". "In the hole" is a corruption of the original nautical term made popular by people who did not understand the original origin. Today, the corruption has become universal.
- An unfavorable count. A pitcher would be "in the hole" 3-0 and a batter would be "in the hole" 0-2.

=== in the (his) kitchen ===
Pitching in on the hitter's hands.

=== in play ===
- A game is in play when the umpire declares "play ball" at the beginning of the game or after a time-out.
- Any batted ball is "in play" until either the play ends, the umpire calls the ball foul, or there is fan interference or some other event that leads to a dead ball. A ball hit into foul territory but in the air is in play (a fielder may attempt to catch it for an out and runners may attempt to advance after such a catch), but only before it hits the ground or the fence.
- In sabermetrics, a special definition of "ball in play" is the calculation of "batting average on balls in play" (BABIP), which excludes home runs even though they are fair balls.
- Also see play.

=== IO (in and out) ===
Infield and outfield practice. "Everyone take your positions for a quick IO"

== J ==
=== J-run ===
The run the pitcher takes from the mound to first base in order to cover for the first baseman who has just fielded the ball.

=== jack ===
A home run or to hit a home run. "Hitting a jack" or "Jacking one out of here".

=== jake ===
Half-hearted or lazy effort by a player, i.e. "He jaked that play."

=== jam ===
- To pitch far enough inside that the batter is unable to extend while swinging. "The pitcher jammed the batter." The batter was "handcuffed" or "shackled" by the pitch.
- When runners are in scoring position with less than two outs and good hitters coming up. "The pitcher is in a jam."
- The "bases are jammed" (or loaded or full) when there are runners on all three.

=== janitor throw ===
When an outfielder, 'cleaning' a pitcher's mess by throwing a runner out, spins or falls down after a strong throw.

=== jelly legs ===
A batter's legs are "made out of jelly" when he departs from a good stance. "His curve ball ... it jelly-legs you." - Phillies First Baseman Jim Thome, referring to Barry Zito's curve.

=== jerk ===
To "pull" the ball towards left field if you bat right handed or "pull" the ball towards right field if you're batting left handed. Opposite of jerk would be push or hitting an "oppo", meaning going towards the opposite field.

To hit the ball hard, typically used to refer to pulling the ball over the fence for a home run. "Derrek Lee jerked one of his patented doubles into the left-field corner to lead off the fourth against Minnesota lefty Johan Santana, the reigning Cy Young winner."

=== Judy ===
A Punch and Judy hitter who hits with little power.

=== juiced ===
- "Bases juiced" means #bases loaded.
- A player who is said to be juiced is thought to be taking performance-enhancing drugs. "It is now assumed, of course, that Bonds may well have been juiced on steroids at the time; the previous year he had set the all-time single-season record of 73 home runs, and his musculature was almost freakishly swollen."
- A baseball that is juiced has been modified in some way that makes it travel farther when hit. "Spectacular increases in home runs have often raised the question: Has the ball been juiced up to travel farther, in order to increase the number of home runs?"

=== jump ===
- A fielder is said to get a good jump on the ball when he anticipates or reacts quickly to a batted ball and is thereby able to make a good play by fielding or catching it. Also see crack of the bat.
- A baserunner gets a good jump when he is able to leave the base well before the pitch reaches the plate. "Upsetting the timing of the baserunner can effectively prevent him from getting a good jump ... Base runners often read a pitcher's look and get their jump, or start, based on the pattern the pitcher establishes."
- To move to another team or league despite existing contractual obligations.

=== Junior Circuit ===
The American League, so-called because it is the younger of the two major leagues. The American League was founded in 1901, while the National League – the Senior Circuit – was founded in 1876.

=== junk ===
breaking balls and knuckleballs, pitches that are hard to hit due to movement rather than velocity. "I couldn't believe he threw me a fastball because he had me down 1-2", Thames said. "He's usually a junk pitcher and he tried to sneak a fastball past me, and he left it up." See also: Eephus pitch

=== junkball pitcher ===
A pitcher who throws predominantly junk, usually due to a weak (or slow) fastball. A junkballer, junkman or a junk artist: "Like all junk artists, Trujillo will have to prove himself at the higher levels before getting a shot at a major league job." Pitcher Randy Jones earned the nickname "Junkman" for his mastery of this style of pitching. See also: Eephus pitch

== K ==
=== K ===
The traditional abbreviation for a strikeout. A backwards K is often used to denote a called strikeout. Invented by Henry Chadwick by taking the "most prominent" letter and reinforcing it with an inferred knockout, the connotation still exists when an announcer says the pitcher "punched out" the batter, a play on words that also refers to punching a time clock and to the motion a home plate umpire usually makes on a called third strike.

=== keep off the boards ===
Also singular, "keep off the board". Keep a team from scoring, and hence off the scoreboard. "Wainwright has kept runs off the board at a better rate than Lester." "After loading the bases with one down in the fourth, the Gators were kept off the board by Barham."

=== keep the hitter honest ===
A pitcher needs to mix up his pitches and thereby "keep the hitter honest" by making it difficult for the hitter to anticipate the type, speed, and location of the next pitch. Sometimes this means throwing a brushback pitch to keep the batter from leaning over the plate to reach a pitch on the outer part of the plate. "Partially with Boston in mind, Wang focused this spring on expanding his repertoire to keep hitters honest and move them off the plate."

=== keep the line moving ===
A reference to a series of batters getting on base safely and advancing runners on base, alluding to an assembly line. "Beltran's popout tore apart a rally that had shaken the Hall of Fame-bound Rivera, molding a game out of what moments before had been a five-run rout. Instead, Beltran couldn't keep the line moving, leaving an eager David Wright awaiting on deck." The 2015 Kansas City Royals were one of the most notable examples of "keeping the line moving" during their postseason run, which led to a World Series title.

=== keystone ===
- Second base.
- Together the shortstop and second baseman – the fielders nearest second base, often combining on double plays – are sometimes referred to as the keystone combination.

=== kicked ===
A player who makes an error fielding a ground ball may be said to have "kicked the ball" or "kicked it".

=== kill ===
- A batter who hits the ball very far may be said to have "killed the ball".
- A pitcher who stifles a rally by the opposing team may be said to have "killed the rally".

=== knee-buckler ===
A breaking ball (usually a curveball) that breaks very sharply, so much so that it freezes the hitter. It starts out directly at the batter (knees buckling out of fear) and then drops into the strike zone.

=== knock ===
- Knock in: To score an RBI. "Kenny Lofton knocked in the go-ahead run with a 10th-inning single Thursday afternoon as the Cleveland Indians beat Detroit."
- A hit: as in "a two-base knock".
- Knocks: Hard hits or extra-base hits, not necessarily producing RBIs or referring to a specific type of hit. "Curtis had some solid knocks today."
- Knocked around: A pitcher who gives up a lot of hits and gets removed from the game is said to have been knocked around or knocked out of the box or knocked out of the game. Example headline: "Toronto 7, Detroit 4: Phil Coke knocked around; Tigers' bats don't respond".
- Knock down: an infielder who stops a line drive from getting through the infield "knocks it down", perhaps then picking up the ball and throwing the runner out.
- Knock off: to knock off an opponent is to win the game. "Hawaiʻi knocks off Santa Clara."
- Knock the cover off the ball: to hit a baseball extremely hard. See also tore the cover off the ball.

=== knuckleball ===
A pitch thrown with no spin, traditionally thrown with the knuckles, but also with the fingertips. It tends to flutter and move suddenly and erratically on its way to the plate. Also refers to a batted ball that flutters "like a knuckleball". SYNONYMS: knuckler, flutterball, butterfly ball, floater, bug.

== L ==
=== lace ===
To reach base by hitting a ball between infielders. "McCann laced it through the shift on the right side of the infield."

=== Lady Godiva ===
A pitch delivered with nothing on it. A nod to the legend of Lady Godiva riding naked on horseback.

=== LAIM ===
An acronym for League Average Inning Muncher. A LAIM is generally a starting pitcher who can provide around 200 innings over the course of a season with an ERA (Earned Run Average) near the league average. A LAIM is counted on to consume innings, keeping his team in the game but not necessarily shutting down the opposition. The term was coined by baseball blogger Travis Nelson, but is used by other writers as well.

=== large sausage ===
A slang term for a grand slam home run. It is a takeoff from the term "grand salami" which some people use to refer to a grand slam.

=== laser show ===
A batting performance with a high number of base hits, particularly line drives. Also, the nickname of Boston Red Sox second baseman Dustin Pedroia.

=== late innings ===
The seventh, eighth and ninth innings of a regulation nine-inning game.

=== laugher ===
A game in which one team gets a large lead, perhaps early in the game, and it appears the other team has no chance at all of catching up. With nothing to worry about, the manager and team can relax. An easy win; a romp; a blowout.

=== launch ===
- To hit a long fly ball, as if launching a rocket. "Orso, who recently signed with Alabama Southern to play college baseball next season, launched several rocket shots and by far hit the furthest home runs of anyone in the competition ..."
- It is also said that a pitcher "launches" the ball when he throws a wild pitch that gets away from the catcher, and that a fielder "launches" the ball when he throws it wildly out-of-reach of the intended receiver.

=== launch angle ===
The angle, with respect to the ground at home plate, at which a batted ball leaves the bat.

=== launch pad ===
A term for a ballpark in which many home runs are hit. The Atlanta Braves' former home of Atlanta–Fulton County Stadium became known as "The Launching Pad" for this reason.

=== Lawrence Welk ===
A (rare) 1-2-3 double play ("... an a one, an a two, an a ...").

=== lay down ===
A player who bunts the ball is said to lay down a bunt. Also see dump.

=== lay off ===
If a batter decides not to swing at a pitch, especially if he deliberately avoids swinging at certain types of pitches, he may be said to "lay off" a pitch. Pitchers tempt hitters to swing at pitches they cannot hit; batters try to lay off such pitches. "Batters can't seem to lay off his slider, just as his parents can't seem to lay off his carrot cake—they're nearly addicted to it."

=== lead ===
- When a baserunner steps off a base before a pitch is thrown in order to reduce the distance to the next base he takes a lead.
- The player who is first in the batting order for a given team in any given inning is said to lead off the inning.

=== leadoff hitter ===
- The first batter listed on a team's lineup card (in the 1-hole or the "leadoff spot" on the line-up card). When the announcers read the starting line-up they might say, "Leading off, and playing short-stop, is Sammy Speedyrunner. Batting second, playing second base, Carlos Contacthitter. Batting third, in the pitcher's spot, is designated hitter Burt "Biggie" Brokenleg. Batting clean-up, playing left field, Thor Thunderbat ..."
- The first batter in an inning (who could be in any hole on a team's line-up card). If that batter gets a single, or a home run, or a walk, the announcer would say he has a "leadoff single", a "leadoff home run", or a "leadoff walk" respectively.

=== leaning ===
A baserunner is said to be "caught leaning" or "leaning the wrong way" when he is picked off a base while shifting his weight toward the next base.

=== leather ===
- Referring to a fielder's glove, a player with good leather is a good defensive player (typically an infielder).
- Flashing the leather means making an outstanding defensive play.
- A leather player refers to a player who is outstanding on defense but only average or even less on offense. Ron Karkovice is one example of a "leather player".

=== left-handed bat ===
Although baseball bats are symmetrical in shape, and thus there is no such thing as a left-handed baseball bat (or a right-handed baseball bat), in colloquial language a hitter who bats left-handed may be referred to as a "left-handed bat" or "left-hand bat". Headline: "Giants look to acquire left-handed bat".

=== left-handed hitter ===
Also "left-hand hitter". A batter who, paradoxically, bats from the right-side of the plate. Typically, an individual who is left-handed in most activities, including throwing a baseball, stands in the right-hand batter's box, the one closest to first base.

=== left-handed specialist ===
A left-handed relief pitcher specializing in getting one out, often in critical situations. See also LOOGY.

=== left on base ===
A baserunner is said to have been left on base (abbreviated LOB) or stranded when the half-inning ends and he has not scored or been put out. This includes a batter-runner who has hit into a fielder's choice, causing another runner to be put out as the third out. It also includes runners on base at the end of a game, as when the home team scores a winning run in the ninth or a subsequent inning. Thus, a batter who hits a single in the bottom of the tenth inning in a tied game with the bases loaded drives in one run and leaves three on base (himself and the runners who were at first and second).
- Team LOB totals are commonly reported in a baseball box score. It counts only those left standing on the bases when the third out of each inning occurs. Team LOB is used in "proving" a box score. The number of a team's plate appearances is to equal the sum of that team's runs, that team's LOB, and the opposing team's putouts. In other words, every batter who completes a plate appearance is accounted for as a run scored, putout, or LOB.
- Individual LOB totals are sometimes reported in baseball box scores. This is a more recent statistic that is computed for each player who is at bat at least once in a game and is calculated on how many baserunners were "left on base" when the player was at-bat and caused an out, no matter how many outs there were at the time. Note that "at bat" does not include other plate appearances such as sacrifice bunts or flies made by the batter, third outs caused by pickoffs or caught stealing, or games ended with the winning run scoring on a successful steal, etc. Two common misconceptions of the individual LOB are that the individual LOB is the number of times the player was left on base as a baserunner (this is a "runner's LOB" and is not usually recorded), or that the individual LOB applies only when the at-bat player caused the third out. Note that the total of the individual LOBs for all players on a team will usually exceed the team LOB.
- A related statistic is "left on base in scoring position", which includes only those LOB where the runner was occupying second or third base. Yet another related statistic is "left on base in scoring position with less than two out". The intent of these statistics is to measure the tendency of a team or player to waste opportunities to score.

=== leg out ===
To run hard to get safely on base or to advance a base: "Podsednik legged out an infield hit, stole second and scored when Everett legged out a double."

=== letter high ===
A letter-high pitch is one that crosses the plate at the height of the letters on the batter's chest. Also see at the letters. Equivalent term: "chest high". "Dietrich fouled off a couple of pitches before Porcello put him away with a letter-high fastball at 94."

=== leverage situation ===
A moment in a game with a potentially high impact on win probability. Such events are given a leverage index.

=== lift ===
To remove a player from the lineup in the middle of a game. "Casey was lifted for a pinch runner."

=== lights-out ===
A pitcher who so dominates the hitters that the game is effectively over once he takes the mound—so they can turn out the lights and go home. The pitcher retires the batters in order without allowing a single run. "Putz pitched lights-out baseball once he took over the job for good from Guardado."

=== Linda Ronstadt ===
A fastball the pitcher delivers with such velocity that the hitter has no time to respond—it "blew by you." A pun on the song title "Blue Bayou," originally recorded in 1961 by Roy Orbison but popularized through Linda Ronstadt's 1977 cover version.

=== line drive ===
- Also known as a liner, a line drive is a batted ball that is hit hard in the air and has a low arc. See also rope.
- A line drive may also be said to be "hit on a line".
- A batter may be said to have "lined out" if the liner was caught by a fielder.
- Line drives can be dangerous to baseball players and spectators. For example, on July 22, 2007, Tulsa Drillers first base coach Mike Coolbaugh was killed in a line drive accident at an away game with the Arkansas Travelers. Though the ball hit his neck, his death was the impetus for base coaches to start wearing helmets. In a 2021 minor league game, pitcher Tyler Zombro was hit in the head by a 104-mile-per-hour (167 km/h) line drive, fracturing his skull and causing him to have a seizure.

=== lineup ===
The batting order, which also lists each player's defensive position. An announcer reading the starting lineup for a game will typically begin something like this: "Batting first, playing second base ..."

=== lineup card ===
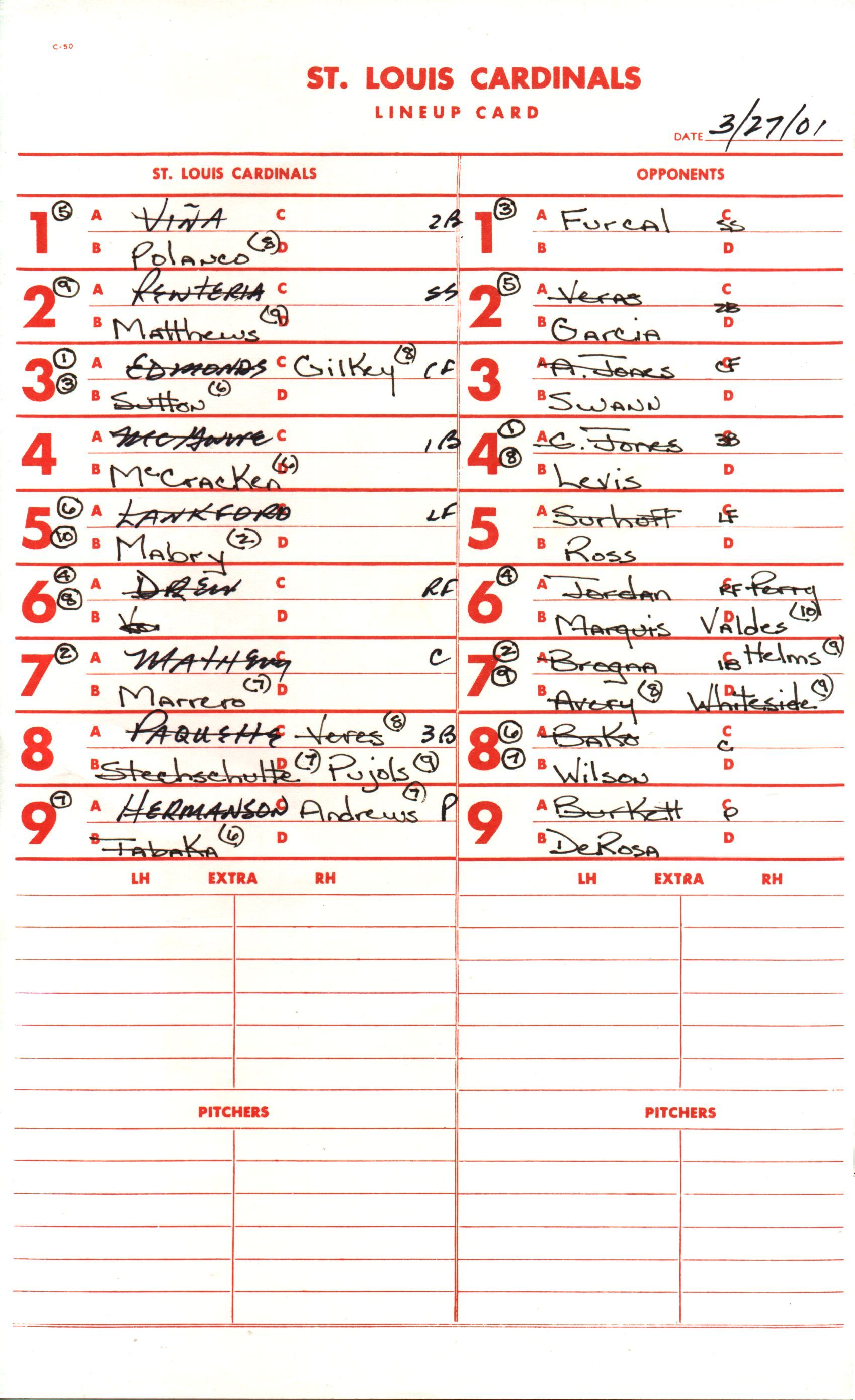
A lineup card from a 2001 spring training game between the St. Louis Cardinals and Atlanta Braves

A form kept by each manager listing the starting players and all other players who are on the active roster and available to play in the game. Typically this form will be taped to the wall inside the dugout for the manager and coaches to consult when they need to make substitutions during a game. Before the game starts the manager hands a lineup card to the home plate umpire. This lineup will change throughout the game as starting players are removed and substitutes inserted.

=== Little League home run ===
A fair ball in which the batter is able to circle the bases and score due to the defense committing one or more errors on the play. Such a play is not officially scored as a home run due to the errors, but the effect on the score is the same.

=== live arm ===
A strong arm, usually describing a pitcher who has a great deal of velocity on his pitches. "That pitcher has a live arm."

=== Live-ball era ===
The time since 1919 or 1920 when several rule changes moved teams to adopt offensive strategies that favored power hitting over the inside game that was common in the dead-ball era.

=== live on the corners ===
A pitcher who "lives on the corners" throws most of his pitches on the inside or outside edges of home plate. He's not inclined to try to overwhelm the hitter with hard pitches down the center of the plate. Many of his pitches will appear to barely nibble the plate.

=== lively fastball/life on the ball ===
A fastball that seems to be not just fast but also hard to hit because it may have some movement on it or it may appear to speed up as it gets closer to the plate. "'His fastball has got more life to it', Jays catcher Rod Barajas said. 'It's finishing. What I mean by that is the last 10 feet [to home plate], it seems that it picks up speed.' According to Barajas, that has particularly helped Ryan against right-handed hitters. "They end up being late, because that last 10 feet, it seems like it picks up a couple miles per hour," Barajas said.

=== load the bases ===
A succession of plays that results in having runners on all three bases. See also bases loaded or bases full.

=== LOB ===
Abbreviation for left on base.

=== locate ===
A pitcher's command is reflected in his ability to locate the ball—to throw it to an intended spot. A pitcher with "good location" not only has command but makes the right choices about where to throw the ball against particular batters.

=== lock him up ===
- To sign a player to a long-term contract, thereby keeping him off the free-agent market. "Come on Uncle Drayton, you have to lock this guy up for a few years. He is one of the best in the league and along with Berkman, is the new face of the Astros."
- To throw a pitch that keeps the hitter from making any effective swing. For example, when a left-handed pitcher throws a roundhouse curve or an inside fastball to a left-handed hitter, the hitter may appear to freeze in place. "We had him 0-2. We were trying to go in with a fastball, hopefully lock him up." Also see "freeze the hitter".

=== lollipop ===
A soft, straight pitch with a lot of arc.

=== long ball ===
A home run. A team is said to "win by the long ball" after a walk-off home run or the team hits several home runs to win. Headline: "Phillies Use the Longball To Take Game 1 from the Dodgers".

=== long ones ===
Home runs. "He ravaged Pacific Coast League pitching for seven more long ones before being recalled by the Reds later the same month."

=== long out ===
A ball that is hit deep into the outfield (and caught) is a "long out".

=== long reliever ===
A type of relief pitcher. Long relievers enter early in a game (generally before the 5th inning) when the starting pitcher cannot continue, whether due to ineffective pitching, lack of endurance, rain delay, or injury.

=== long strike ===
A foul ball which finishes particularly close to being fair, often where a fair ball would have been a home run. So named as despite the good effort of the hitter, the result is a strike against him if the count before the pitch was less than two strikes.

=== LOOGY ===
A mildly derogatory nickname for a left-handed specialist. An acronym for "Lefty One Out GuY", a left-handed pitcher who may be brought into the game to pitch against just one or two left-handed batters to take extreme advantage of platoon effects. An example is Javier López, who was a key component of the Giants' World Series winning bullpen in the 2010s. In 2020, MLB instituted a new rule that any pitcher who enters the game in the middle of an inning must face at least three batters or finish the inning before he can be replaced, unless he is injured. This rule intends to reduce the length of a game by limiting pitching changes, but also reduces the benefit of a LOOGY on the roster, since most of the time he would also have to face a right-handed hitter, who is much more likely to get a hit off him.

=== look the runner back ===
- When there is a runner on first base, a pitcher who has already gone into the stretch may step off the rubber and either threaten a throw toward first base or just stare at the runner to encourage him to step back toward first. In either case he's said to "look the runner back" to first (rather than throwing over to first in an effort to pick the runner off).
- When there is a runner on second or third base (but not first) with fewer than two outs, an infielder fielding a sharp ground ball briefly stares at the runner to discourage him from trying to advance. The fielder then throws to first to force out the batter.

=== looper ===
A softly hit Texas leaguer that drops in between the infielders and outfielders. Also blooper. A fielder may make a superior defensive play, however, and turn a looper into an out. "Sacramento's Lloyd Turner ended the fourth with a sprinting, sliding snag of Alvin Colina's looping liner to left that sent the stands into a frenzy."

=== Lord Charles ===
A slang term for a "12-to-6" curveball. Similar to Uncle Charlie.

=== lose a hitter ===
When a pitcher gives up a walk, especially when he gets ahead in the count or has a full count but gives up a walk, he is said to have "lost the hitter".

=== losing record ===
During the regular season, the team lost more games than it won. For a modern Major League team, this means a team lost at least 82 games out of 162 games played in what is called the losing season.

=== losing streak ===
A series of consecutive losses.

=== loss ===
See Win–loss record (pitching).

=== lost his swing ===
See find his swing.

=== lost the ball in the sun ===
When a player attempting to catch a fly ball is temporarily blinded by the glare of the sun in his eyes, he may "lose the flyball in the sun".

=== loud out ===
When a batter hits a long fly ball that is caught in the outfield, perhaps when a crowd reacts loudly thinking it will be a homer, the announcer may say the batter made a "loud out". "Home runs are already overrated. A home run in one park is a loud out in another." "Long, loud out as Garciaparra takes Green to the warning track. But the former Dodger makes the catch easily and we're in the bottom of the third."

=== lumber ===
A baseball bat. Sometimes used in reference to a powerful offensive showing, "The Yankees busted out the lumber tonight with a 10–0 victory." Also timber.

== M ==
=== Maddux ===
Colloquial term for a game in which the pitcher throws a complete game shutout, on 99 or fewer pitches. Named after Hall of Fame pitcher Greg Maddux, who threw 13 such shutouts in his career.

=== Magic number ===
A number that indicates how close a front-running team is to clinching a division or season title. It represents the total of additional wins by the front-running team or additional losses by the rival team after which it is mathematically impossible for the rival team to capture the title.

=== magic words ===
Specific words directed towards an umpire that are almost certain to cause immediate ejection from the game.

=== major league ===
A top-level league in organized or professional baseball.

=== make a statement ===
When a player does something to catch the attention or make an impression on the other team, he may be said to "make a statement". Perhaps he makes a spectacular fielding play, hits a home run, slides hard into second base, or throws a brushback pitch. This phrase is also used in other sports when a team seeks to show up or to demonstrate its power against an opponent. "There were a lot of times where we could have given up, but no one gave up. We made a statement here tonight".

=== make the pitcher work ===
When an offensive team tries to make the opposing pitcher throw a lot of pitches and tire them out by working the count, or taking pitches or fouling off pitches, it is said to be making the pitcher work. "We've got a lot of good hitters up and down this lineup, but the key is to make the pitchers work", Laird said. "Tonight we made Saunders work. Then we got to their bullpen and were able to string some key hits together."

=== make-up call ===
When an umpire makes a bad call on a pitch, he may implicitly acknowledge it on a later pitch by making another bad call to "make up" for the first. For example, say an umpire mistakenly calls a strike on a pitch that is out of the strike zone; he may later call a ball on a pitch that is in the strike zone so the hitter gets back what was initially taken away. Umpires typically, and understandably, deny there is any such thing as a "make-up call".

=== make-up game ===
When a game is canceled because of a rainout or some other reason, a make-up game is usually scheduled later in the season. Late in the regular season if the outcome of that game would not affect which teams would reach the play-offs, then the game might not be made up.

=== manager ===
See field manager. Different from the general manager.

=== Manfred man ===
The runner placed on second base to start all extra innings beginning in the 2020 season. The rule change was put in place during the COVID-19 pandemic in order to prevent marathon games. The name is a reference to Rob Manfred, the Commissioner of Baseball at the time the rule was implemented, and is a pun on the name of Manfred Mann (musician).

=== manufacturing runs ===
Producing runs one at a time, piece by piece, component by component by means of patience at the plate, contact hitting, advancing runners, taking advantage of errors, alert baserunning including stealing a base or advancing on an out or a mistake by a fielder. In other words: small ball.

=== masher ===
A home run hitter. See crush the ball.

=== matchsticks ===
A string of ones on the scoreboard, indicating successive innings in which exactly one run was scored. Also referred to as a picket fence.

=== "May I help you?" ===
- Typically a good-natured jab at the batter by his own teammates when he watches several good pitches without swinging. It is a reference to when a retail clerk asks a customer if they may help them find something, and the customer replies that they are "just looking."
- It is similar to the term "window shopping," but can be used at any point during the at-bat.

=== meat ===
- On the barrel (fat end) of the bat, but not the very end, is the "meat" of the bat where a hitter tries to make contact with the ball.
- The "meat (of the order)" is the middle of the lineup, usually the strongest hitters.
- A rookie, popularized by the baseball movie, Bull Durham; implies more brawn than brain.
- An easy out, typically evident during a strikeout.
- A baserunner easily thrown out at a base.
- Throwing hand, typically meaning a pitcher's. "Glavine started to reach for the ball with his meat hand but then thought better of it."

=== meatball ===
An easy pitch to hit—down the middle of the plate.

=== Mendoza Line ===
A batting average of .200. Named for Mario Mendoza, a notoriously poor hitter but decent shortstop who managed to have a 9-year major league career from 1974 to 1982 with a lifetime batting average of .215.

=== men in blue ===
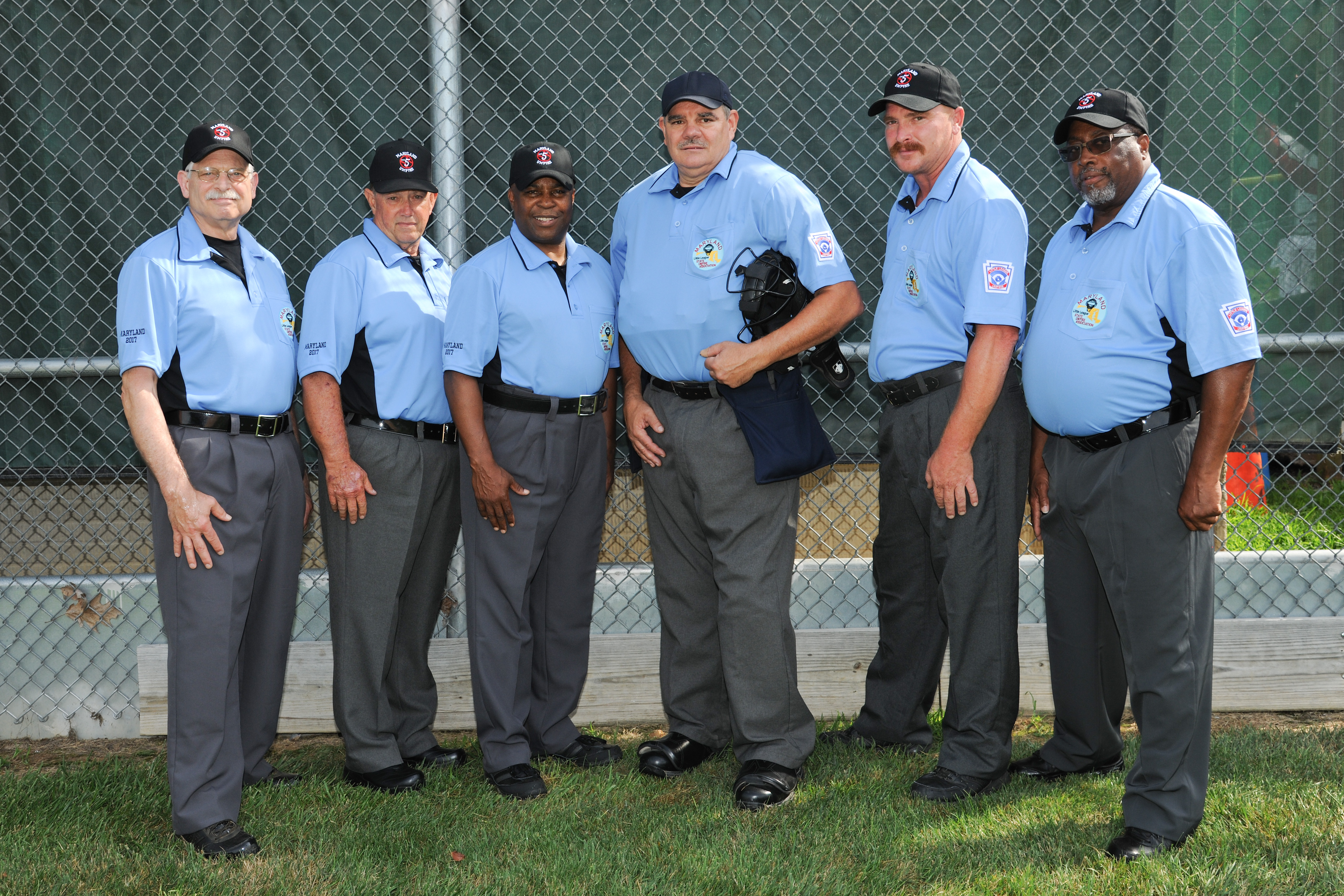
Little League umpires wearing blue

The umpires.

=== mercy rule ===
See run rule.

=== metal bat swing ===
A long swing that does not protect the inside part of the plate. Generally used to describe college players adjusting to professional ball and wooden bats.

=== middle infielders ===
The second baseman and shortstop.

=== middle innings ===
The fourth, fifth and sixth innings of a regulation nine-inning game.

=== middle of the inning ===
The time between the top half and bottom half of an inning when the visiting team takes the field and the home team prepares to bat. No gameplay occurs during this period and television and radio broadcasts typically run advertisements. See also seventh-inning stretch.

=== middle of the order hitter ===
A batter who hits with power and who thus may be suited to be in the third, fourth, or fifth slot in the batting order. "With the oblique strain injury to catcher and middle-of-the-order hitter Tyler Stephenson, Trevino slots into the bottom of the order."

=== middle reliever ===
A relief pitcher who is brought in typically during the middle-innings (4, 5, and 6). Since they are typically in the game because the starting pitcher allowed the opponents a lot of runs, the middle reliever is expected to hold down the opponents' scoring for an inning or two in hopes that their own team can close the gap.

=== midnight ===
Used during the early days of racial integration to refer to any African-American player.

=== miscue ===
An error. A word from billiards, when the cue stick slips or just brushes the cue ball thereby leading to a missed shot.

=== miss some bats ===
A pitcher who excels at getting batters to swing but miss is said to "miss some bats". A relief pitcher who is good at missing bats may be brought into a game when the other team already has runners in scoring position.

=== miss some spots ===
A pitcher who does not have good command of their pitches and is not able to throw the ball where they intend to is said to "miss some spots". "Angels Manager Mike Scioscia agreed. 'He missed some spots on a couple of hitters', Scioscia said, 'and they didn't miss their pitches'."

=== mistake ===
- A "mistake" is poor execution, as distinguished from an error. It could be throwing to the wrong base, missing the cut-off, running into an obvious out, or throwing a pitch into the batter's "hot zone" instead of where the catcher set up for it.
- There may be such a thing as a mistake hitter (a mediocre hitter who occasionally gets a pitch he can drive), but a "mistake pitcher" does not last long in the big leagues.
- When asked how the mighty Yankees lost the 1960 World Series, Yogi Berra remarked, "We made too many wrong mistakes."

=== mitt ===
"Mitt" (derived from "mitten") can refer to any type of baseball glove, though the term is officially reserved to describe the catcher's mitt and the first-baseman's mitt. Those mitts (like a mitten) have a slot for the thumb and a single sheath covering all the fingers, rather than the individual finger slots that gloves have. By rule, mitts are allowed to be worn only by the catcher and the first baseman. See the entry on glove.

=== mix up pitches ===
To be successful, most pitchers have to use a variety of pitches, and to mix them up tactically (not randomly) to keep hitters off balance. "Jackson was overwhelming. 'I was just trying to come out and be aggressive and mix my pitches up', he said. 'I've seen them in the past and I know what they can do. You have to mix it up to keep them honest'."

=== MLB ===
Commonly-used abbreviation for Major League Baseball, the organization that operates the two North American major professional baseball leagues, the American League and the National League.

=== money pitch ===
A pitcher's best pitch, or the one he throws at the most critical time. They are said to earn their pay – their money – with that pitch. Headline: "The Outlawed Spitball Was My Money Pitch".

=== money player ===
A man who is good in the clutch. Someone you can count on (or bet on) when it really matters. Sometimes the term used is simply "money", as in "Alex has really been money these last few games".

=== moneyball ===
An often misused term. It refers to Michael Lewis's 2002 book. "Moneyball player" most often refers to one who has a high on-base percentage, and does not steal a lot of bases. However, the essence of the book is about running an organization effectively by identifying inefficiencies and finding undervalued assets in a given market. As an example, the so-called Moneyball teams have shifted their focus to defense and speed instead of OBP which is no longer undervalued. "Moneyball" is often seen as the antithesis of "smallball", where teams take chances on the basepaths in an attempt to "manufacture" runs. In more traditional baseball circles, evoking Moneyball to describe a player or team can be a term of derision.

=== moonshot ===
A home run that is hit very high. When the Brooklyn Dodgers relocated to Los Angeles and played in the L.A. Coliseum, Wally Moon took advantage of the short distance to the left-field fence—251 feet (77 m) from home plate down the left-field line, compared to 440 feet (130 m) to the right-field fence—to hit high home runs. The ball had to be hit high in order to clear the 42-foot-high (13 m) fence. For comparison, Fenway Park's famous Green Monster is 37 feet (11 m) tall. Dodgers broadcaster Jerry Doggett seems to have coined the phrase in 1959, and the rest of the media picked it up.

=== mop up ===
A mop-up pitcher or "mop-up man" is usually the bullpen's least effective reliever who comes in after the outcome of the game is almost certain. Sometimes other position players also come in to mop up in the last inning in order to gain playing experience as well as give the regulars a rest. "La Russa said Hancock's final outing was typical of a reliever whose role frequently called for mop-up duty." See also: long reliever.

=== morning journal ===
A bat made from low-quality wood, its effectiveness similar to hitting the ball with a rolled-up morning newspaper.

=== motor ===
- A player who gets an extra-base hit, or who is on base when a teammate gets one, is sometimes said to "motor" for an additional base – to continue running without hesitation. "This allowed Loehrke to score, and then a miscue by Ranger right fielder Drew Orbergfell allowed Lounsbury to motor to third base".
- "Pinch runner Brandon Varnell used his blazing speed to motor down the third base line on the fielding error by Memorial reliever Garrett Hill and slide head first into home plate to tie the game at 5-5".

=== mound ===
The pitcher's mound is a raised section in the middle of the diamond where the pitcher stands when throwing the pitch. In Major League Baseball, a regulation mound is 18 feet (5.5 m) in diameter, with the center 59 feet (18 m) from the rear point of home plate, on the line between home plate and second base. The front edge of the pitcher's plate or rubber is 18 inches (46 cm) behind the center of the mound, making it 60 feet 6 inches (18.44 m) from the rear point of home plate. Six inches (15.2 cm) in front of the pitcher's rubber the mound begins to slope downward. The top of the rubber is to be no higher than 10 inches (25 cm) above home plate. From 1903 through 1968 this height limit was set at 15 inches, but was often slightly higher, especially for teams that emphasized pitching, such as the Los Angeles Dodgers, who were reputed to have the highest mound in the majors.

=== mound visit ===
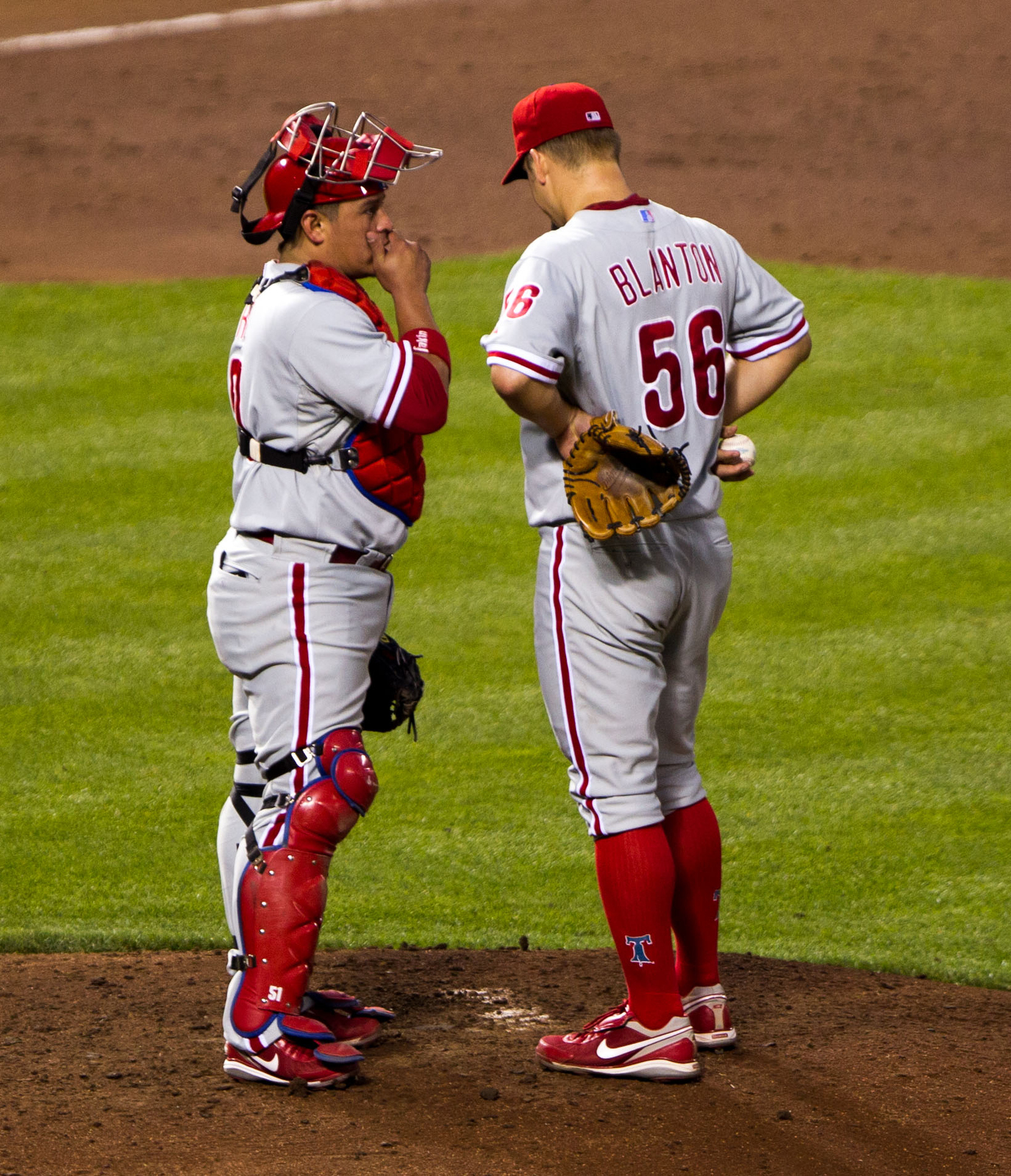
Carlos Ruiz and Joe Blanton of the Philadelphia Phillies conducting a mound visit

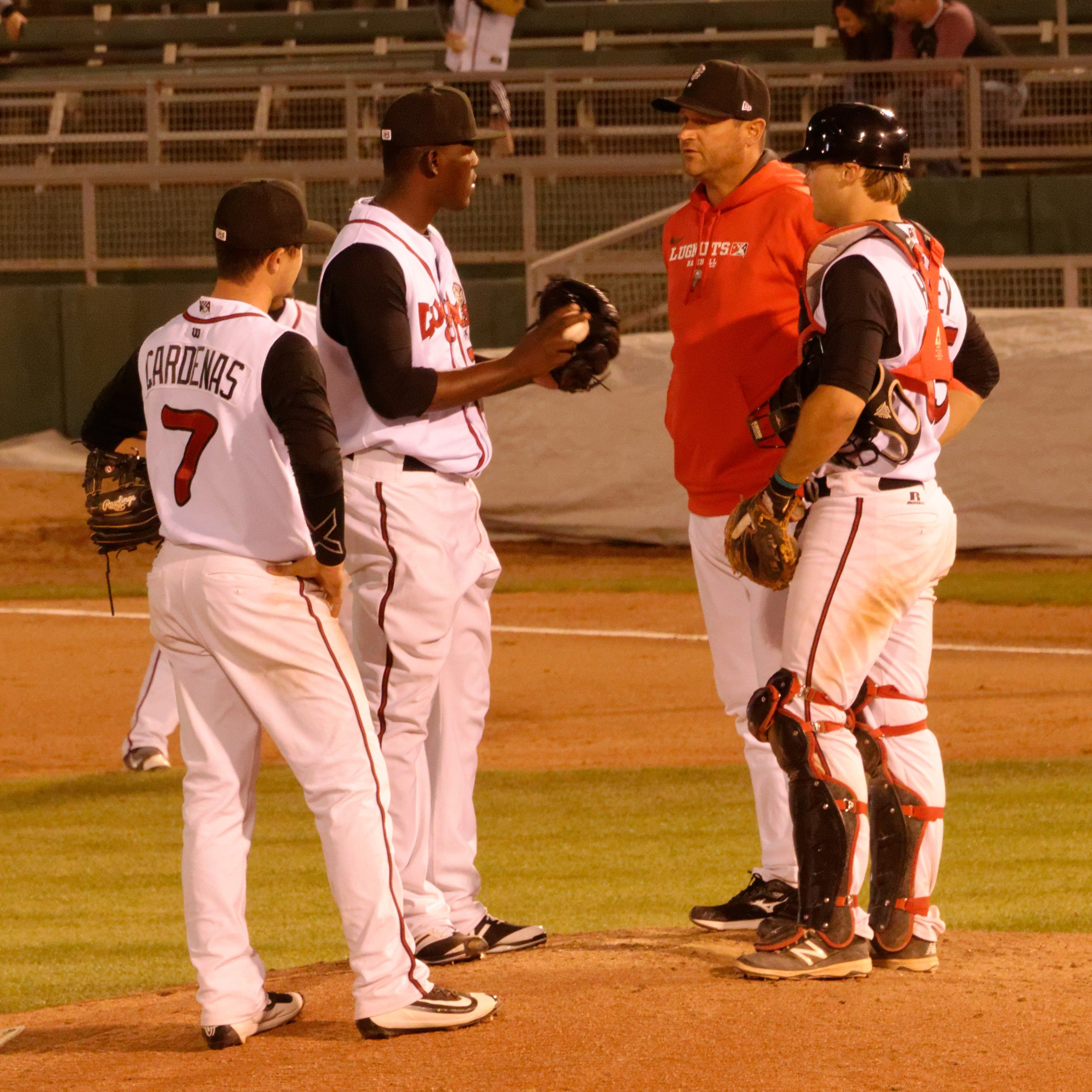
A Lansing Lugnuts mound visit including a pitcher, catcher, pitching coach and infielder

Mound visits or mound meetings occur when the pitching team's coaches, manager or players (most often the catcher) go out to the mound between pitches to consult with the pitcher, generally to discuss strategy. Each team is limited to one mound visit per inning (excluding visits to attend to an injury); a pitching change must be made on any subsequent visit. In 2016, Major League Baseball limited the amount of time allowed for individual mound visits to 30 seconds. In 2018, MLB limited the number of mound visits per team to six per nine-inning game, with one additional mound visit for each extra inning. This was reduced to five per nine-inning game in 2020.

=== moundsman ===
A pitcher.

=== movement ===
Deviations from the expected flight of a pitch that make the ball harder to hit. Can be used to refer to both fastballs and breaking balls.

=== mow 'em down ===
A pitcher who dominates the opposing hitters, allowing few if any to get on base, is said to have "mowed them down" as if they were just so much hay being cut down by a mower.

=== muff ===
To fail to field a ball cleanly, often resulting in an error or only one out on a double play, typically on an easy play. "He muffed it. The ball went right through his legs." Also, to bobble.

=== murderer's row ===
Murderers' Row was the nickname given to the New York Yankees of the late 1920s, in particular the 1927 team. The term was actually coined in 1918 by a sportswriter to describe the pre-Babe Ruth lineup, with quality hitters such as Frank "Home Run" Baker and Wally Pipp who led the A.L. in home runs. In subsequent years, any lineup with a series of power hitters who represent a daunting challenge to pitchers might be dubbed by the press as a "murderer's row".

=== mustard ===
Refers to a high amount of velocity on a throw or pitch. A player may be exhorted to "put some (extra) mustard on it", with "it" usually referring to a pitcher's fastball or fielder's throw.

=== MVP ===
Abbreviation for Most Valuable Player. At the end of every season, the Baseball Writers' Association of America chooses an MVP from each Major League. Typically an MVP is also chosen for each major play-off series, the World Series, and the All-Star Game.

== N ==
=== NA ===
- (NABBP) - the 1857-1870 first governing body of baseball, the National Association of Base Ball Players
- (NA) - the 1871-1875 first professional league (in any sport), the National Association of Professional Base Ball Players
- (NAPBL) - the 1901–2021 trade association of minor leagues, the National Association of Professional Baseball Leagues—officially renamed Minor League Baseball in 1999. Replaced in 2021.

=== nail-biter ===
A close game. Nervous fans may be biting their nails.

=== nailed ===
- Hit by a pitch, drilled, plunked.
- The last pitches or last play of a winning game nail down the win or put the nails in the coffin of the opposing team.
- To throw a runner out: "Watch Pirates CF Oneil Cruz nail runner at home plate".

=== nails ===
A relief pitcher who is as "tough as nails" or very effective at nailing down a win is sometimes said to be "nails". "He has been nails so far, notching four saves already". "This guy has been nails for us," Cardinals manager Tony La Russa said.
Phillies and Mets center fielder Lenny Dykstra was known as "Nails" for his all-out style of play.

=== neighborhood play ===
An informal rule that used to apply to double plays. As long as the defensive player covering second base was in the "neighborhood" of second base when he caught the ball and threw it on to first base, the runner would be called out. The rule was designed to compensate for runners who slid into second too hard, making it dangerous for the defensive player. In recent years, umpires have required the defensive player to have a foot actually on second base, not just in the neighborhood, and have penalized runners who slide toward the defensive players too aggressively, so neighborhood plays are rarely seen today.

=== next batter's box ===
The official name of either of the two on-deck circles. Each team has its own circular area, five feet (1.5 m) in diameter, which is designated for unencumbered use by the on-deck batter (the next batter due to bat after the current batter); the on-deck batter may wish to stretch, run in place, or take practice swings immediately prior to taking his turn in the batter's box (which actually is rectangular in shape). Especially during finals and semifinals, each circle is typically painted with the corresponding team logo. The location of the next batter's box is specifically defined in MLB rules, and the most common method to locate it was granted a patent.

=== nibble ===
When a pitcher focuses on pitching just at the left or right edges of home plate rather than throwing a pitch over the heart of the plate where a batter can get the meat of the bat on the ball, he's said to nibble at the edges. Tigers manager Jim Leyland praised Scherzer for his aggressiveness against such a powerful lineup: "The one thing you can't do against the Yankees is get behind in the count. If you do, they'll just sit on pitches and hit a lot of them hard. Max went after them. He understood he couldn't nibble around the edges of the plate, and he did a heckuva job."

=== nickel curve ===
A slider. Also used to mean an average or possibly "hanging" slider. Hitters look at the spin on a ball when it is released by the pitcher, so the "dot" (circle which is created from the pitcher's rotation on the ball that the batter sees to identify a pitch as a slider out of the pitcher's hand) is said to be "nickel sized". Also, it could be used to mean a pitch with more lateral movement (closer to a slurve than to a slider) rather than velocity.

=== nightcap ===
The second game of a doubleheader.

=== NL or N.L. ===
Abbreviation for National League, the older of the two major leagues.

=== NLCS or N.L.C.S. ===
Abbreviation for National League Championship Series: the final, best 4 out of 7, playoff series to determine the National League champion. The winners of the National League Division Series play in this series. The winner of the NLCS is the winner of the National League pennant and advances to the World Series against the pennant winner from the American League.

=== NLDS or N.L.D.S. ===
Abbreviation for National League Division Series: the first round of the league playoffs, to determine which two teams advance to the National League Championship Series (NLCS). This round pits the winners of each of the three league divisions plus the winner of the wild-card slot (the team that wins the most games in the regular season without winning a division) in two pairings, each of which plays a best three out of five series to determine who advances to the NLCS.

=== NOBLETIGER ===
Acronym for "No Outs Bases Loaded Ending with Team Incapable of Getting an Easy Run" . A situation in which a team, despite occupying all three bases before a single out was recorded, is unable to score any runs from before the inning ends.

=== no decision ===
Any starting pitcher who earns neither a win (W) nor a loss (L) is said to have a "no decision", which has no special meaning in official baseball statistics; however, it has become conventional to note whether he made a quality start.

=== no-doubter ===
A home run whose landing destination in the stands is in no doubt from the moment it leaves the barrel of the bat. A no-doubter will be seen/heard to "leap" off the bat, usually having a launch angle between 20 and 40 degrees and high exit velocity.

=== no-hitter ===
- A game in which one team does not get any hits, a rare feat for a pitcher, especially at the major league level. Also colloquially called a "no-no". If no batter reaches base safely by any means (walk, error, etc.) the pitcher is said to have pitched a perfect game, which is much rarer than a "normal" no-hitter.
- It is a superstition that when a pitcher is working on a no-hitter (or perfect game), his teammates stay far away from him (sometimes even a whole bench length) and will not say anything to anyone about the no-hitter. Some play-by-play on-air announcers will also avoid mentioning the no-hitter until either an opposing batter gets a hit or the no-hitter is completed; others however will mention one in progress and are sometimes blamed for "jinxing" no-hitters.

=== no man's land ===
- The area of the outfield between the middle infielders and outfielders, where a fly ball can fall for a hit (a Texas leaguer).
- A baserunner caught in a pickle is said to be in "no man's land".
- The portion of a ballpark's spectator area, usually the front row of seats, where a fielder may legally reach into to catch a fly ball, while a spectator or other personnel may legally touch same fly ball even if it interferes with the fielder's attempt to catch it. A ball touched by a spectator in this manner is not spectator interference.

=== no room at the inn ===
Sometimes said by a play-by-play announcer when the bases are loaded, i.e., there is no open base. Usually means that intentionally walking and pitching around the batter are poor strategies for the fielding team, as a walk will score a run for the batting team. Also "no place/nowhere to put [the batter]".

=== no-no ===
A no-hitter and a shut-out. Thus no hits, no runs. Headline: "Start of something good: Verlander's no-no may foreshadow future greatness".

=== northpaw ===
A right-handed pitcher. See southpaw.

=== NRI ===
A Non-Roster Invitee (NRI) is a player invited to Spring training who is not yet on a Major League team's 40-man roster. He may be a young prospect, a veteran who has been released from or retired from a previous contract with a team, perhaps someone who left baseball after an injury. If he performs well, he has a chance to be placed on the roster and assigned to a minor league team or even join the major league team.

=== nubber ===
A batted ball that travels slowly and not very far, typically because the ball is hit with the very end of the bat.

== O ==
=== obstruction ===
When a fielder illegally hinders a baserunner. He does not need to "get out of the way" while he is fielding the ball or actually has it (and can tag).

=== OBP ===
See on-base percentage.

=== O-fer ===
A batter who goes hitless in a game, as in 0 for 4 (spoken as oh fur). Also wears the collar or "takes the collar."

=== official game ===
A game that can be considered complete. If more than half the game has been played before being ended, or "called", by an umpire, it is considered official and all records from the game are computed in the players' and teams' statistics. For a nine-inning game, five innings need to be played, or 4 1/2 if the home team is winning. An incomplete game can be either suspended or replayed from the first inning.

=== official scorer ===
The official scorer is a person appointed by the league to record the events on the field and to send this official record to the league offices. The official scorer never goes on the field during a game (but typically watches from the press box). The official scorer's judgments do not affect the progress or outcome of the game but they do affect game and player statistics. For example, only umpires call balls and strikes, whether a batted ball is fair or foul, whether a hit is a home run, and whether runners are safe or out. But it is the official scorer who determines whether a pitch that got by the catcher is a wild pitch or a passed ball, and whether a batted ball is a hit or an error (or a combination of the two); likewise whose errors, put-outs and assists are whose.

=== off day ===
- A day when a player performs below his normal level, whether due to illness, bad luck, or other factors. "Bonderman had an off-day and didn't have good command of his breaking pitches."
- A day when a team does not have a game scheduled. During the regular season, Major League Baseball teams almost always have games scheduled on Fridays, Saturdays, and Sundays, and they may need to travel between series. Off-days tend to occur on Mondays and Thursdays.

=== off-speed pitch ===
A pitch that is significantly slower than a given pitcher's fastball. Typically, a curveball or a change-up.

=== off the hook ===
When a team that is behind ties the game or takes the lead, the pitcher who would otherwise have been credited with the loss is said to be "off the hook".

=== off the trademark ===
When a player hits the ball off the middle of the bat, where the manufacturer's trademark is usually placed, resulting in a weakly hit ball. Usually the result of a pitcher jamming the hitter.

=== OFP ===
Overall Future Potential (OFP) is a scouting assessment of a young player's potential as a future major leaguer, scored from 20 to 80. The criteria are different for pitchers and position players. See also 5-tool player.

=== ol' number one ===
A fastball. From the sign the catcher gives for that pitch.

=== Olympic rings ===
When a batter strikes out five times in a game. This same dubious achievement is also called a platinum sombrero.

=== on a line ===
When an outfielder throws the ball directly to an infielder or the catcher without relaying it or bouncing it, he's said to "throw the ball on a line". Usually used when a strong throw beats the runner and gets him out. "Jack Barry, however, made a running stab to grab the ball and threw on a line to McInnis for an out."

=== on-base percentage (OBP) ===
Percentage of plate appearances where a batter reaches base for any reason other than an error or a fielder's choice.

=== on deck ===
The next batter due to bat after the current batter. The area designated for the on-deck batter is a circle five feet (1.5 m) in diameter, officially called the "next batter's box" and commonly called the "on-deck circle". Ironically, the on-deck batter rarely stands in the on-deck circle.

=== one-game wonder ===
A player who appears in just one major league game, plays respectably, and then is demoted either to the bench or back to the minors.

=== one-hitter ===
A game in which one team was limited to one hit, a great feat for a pitcher. Batters may have reached base via walks, errors, or being hit by a pitch. See also no-hitter and perfect game.

=== one-hop the wall ===
When a batted ball bounces once on the playing surface before hitting or going over the outfield wall.

=== one-two-three inning ===
Side retired in order. Three up, three down.

=== on his horse ===
Running at full speed, especially in reference to an outfielder tracking down a fly ball.

=== on the black ===
- The edge of home plate, derived from its black border, which is buried if the plate is properly installed.
- A pitch that just nicks the edge of the zone for a called strike.

=== on the board ===
A team is "on the board" (the scoreboard) when it has scored one or more runs. "After being shut out for six innings, the Sox are finally on the board." White Sox announcer Hawk Harrelson also uses the phrase as part of his home run call: "You can put it on the booooard ... YES!"

=== on the farm ===
When a player is playing in the minor leagues, he is said to be spending time "on the farm". It refers to a team's farm system.

=== on the interstate ===
A player batting between .100 and .199 is said to be "on the interstate". The term refers to the fact that a batting average in the .100s can resemble an interstate name (e.g., .195 looks like I-95, especially on older scoreboards). A hit to put an average above .199 gets a batter "off the interstate." A batter whose average is below .100 is sometimes said to be "off the map". See also Mendoza line. Players in the majors who spend too much time "on the interstate" will most likely be demoted to Triple-A.

=== on the ropes ===
When a pitcher appears to be tired or lost command of his pitches, he may be said to be "on the ropes" and about to be replaced by another pitcher. The term likely derives from the sport of boxing, in which a fighter who is being beaten up or dominated by his opponent may lean against the ropes to keep from falling to the mat.

=== on the rug ===
A player is said to be "on the rug" while playing a ball in the outfield on artificial turf.

=== on the throw ===
- A defensive attempt to put out a baserunner attempting to reach more bases than the type of hit would typically allow, such as a runner on first attempting to advance to third on a single.
- Also refers to the successful advance of a baserunner while such a play is being attempted on his teammate. See also: fielder's choice.
- A batter who safely reaches first base but is tagged out attempting to reach a subsequent base on the same play is credited with a hit for the number of bases he safely reached, but is said to be out on the throw.
- Example: With Abel on first base, Baker hits a base hit to center field. Abel easily reaches second and tries to advance to third, but the throw from the outfield is in time and he is tagged out by the third baseman. Meanwhile, Baker has safely reached second base. Abel is out at third base on the throw. Baker has a single and advanced to second on the throw. The next batter, Charlie, hits a double to the center field wall, allowing Baker to score from second. Charlie safely rounds first and second base and attempts for third, but the throw from center field is in time and Charlie is tagged out at third base. Charlie is credited with an RBI double, but is out at third base on the throw.

=== opener ===
A traditional relief pitcher who starts a game for strategic reasons and is replaced early in the game, usually after the first inning, by a pitcher who is expected to last as many innings as a true starter.

=== opening day ===
The first day of regular-season play in Major League Baseball and other professional leagues.

=== opposite field hit ===
A hit to the "opposite" side of the field from the direction of a player's natural swing, i.e., a left-handed batter who hits to left field or a right-handed batter who hits to right field. Also known as going the other way. See pull hitter.

=== OPS (On-base Plus Slugging) ===
A term recently invented by statheads to measure of a batter's ability to produce runs. Obtained by adding slugging percentage and on-base percentage.

=== ordinary effort ===
Defined in MLB Rule 2 as "the effort that a fielder of average skill at a position in that league or classification of leagues should exhibit on a play, with due consideration given to the condition of the field and weather conditions." A defensive player's ordinary effort is considered by the official scorer in making certain judgment calls, such as hit vs. error or wild pitch vs. passed ball.

=== out ===
One of the fundamental ways the defensive team stops the offensive team from scoring. It occurs when a batter or baserunner is retired from play, meaning they are no longer eligible to continue their turn at bat or advance on the bases. Each team is allowed three outs per half-inning, after which the teams switch roles.
Some common ways an out can happen:
- Strikeout: The batter accumulates three strikes without putting the ball in play.
- Flyout: A fielder catches a batted ball before it hits the ground.
- Groundout: A fielder throws the ball to first base before the batter gets there.
- Tag out: A runner is tagged with the ball while not on a base.
- Force out: A runner is forced to advance, and a fielder touches the base before the runner arrives.
- Interference or rule violations: Such as batting out of turn or using an illegal bat.

=== out pitch ===
The type of pitch that a pitcher relies on to get an out, often his best pitch. Headline: "Rodriguez embraces change as out pitch".

=== outfielder ===
An outfielder is a player whose position is either left field, center field, or right field. See position.

=== outside corner ===
The location of a strike that travels over the far edge of home plate from the batter.

=== overpower the hitter ===
To throw a pitch that is so fast the batter cannot catch up to it with his swing. "And eight runs were more than enough offense to back Wolfe, as he continually overpowered hitters with his blazing fastball. Santa Clara hitters just couldn't catch up to it."

=== overshift ===
A baseball vernacular term synonymous with "shift", either an infield or outfield shift. The fielders shift to occupy the areas a particular batter is thought to typically hit.

=== overthrow ===
- When a fielder throws the ball so high that it sails over the head and out of reach of his target. "Sean Halton struck out, but the catcher couldn't hold onto the pitch, and then overthrew first base, which allowed both Martin and Greene to score."
- If a thrown ball goes over the head or wide of the infielder and sails off the field of play into the dugout or the stands, the umpire will rule an overthrow and allow the runner to advance one base.
- A pitcher who throws the ball too hard to control it well is said to be "overthrowing the ball". "Gardenhire said Crain, demoted to Class AAA Rochester earlier this season, is pitching with more confidence and, most importantly, he's not trying to overthrow the ball."

== P ==
=== paint ===
To throw pitches at the edges of the strike zone. A pitcher who can "paint" consistently may be said to paint the black or paint the corner.

=== pair of shoes ===
A batter who strikes out looking. "He was left standing there like nothing but a pair of shoes."

=== paper doll cutter ===
A hard hit line drive that is hit so "square" and powerfully, that it has little or no spin. (Like a knuckleball) This results in the ball suddenly and sharply cutting left or right as it speeds past defenders. It is said that if such a hit were to strike a defensive player or runner, they would be left "cutting paper dolls" for the rest of their lives.

=== parachute ===
A fly ball, perhaps driven into a strong wind, that appears to drop straight down into the fielder's glove.

=== park ===
To hit (a home run) "out of the park"; reference to the parking lot may be inferred.

=== park effects ===
See hitter's park.

=== passed ball ===
A catcher is charged with a passed ball (abbreviated PB) when he fails to hold or control a legally pitched ball which, in the opinion of the official scorer, should have been held or controlled with ordinary effort, and which permits a runner or runners to advance at least one base; and/or permits the batter to advance to first base, if it's a third strike (with first base unoccupied and/or two outs). A run that scores because of a passed ball is not scored as an earned run. Neither a passed ball nor a wild pitch is charged as an error. It is a separately kept statistic.

=== paste ===
To hit the ball hard. Often used in the past tense: "He pasted the ball."

=== patient hitter ===
Doesn't do a lot of first-pitch swinging, swinging at pitches out of the strike zone, or even swinging at strikes he can't hit because of their location and/or type. Generally gets a lot of walks.

=== patrol ===
- An outfielder may be said to be "patrolling the outfield" (like a good soldier or police officer patrolling his assigned territory),
- A catcher who keeps runners from stealing bases is said to be good at "patrolling the basepaths".

=== payback ===
If after the pitcher from one team tries to bean or otherwise hit a batter, the opposing pitcher retaliates by trying to hit a batter from the first pitcher's team, it's a "payback". Such retaliation often happens when it is one of a team's stars who is the initial target; in such a case the opposing pitcher is likely to target the star player on the other team when he gets his first opportunity. Umpires may issue a warning if they think a pitch is intentionally thrown at a batter, and if such an attempt happens again by either team's pitcher, the pitcher is likely to be ejected from the game.

=== payoff game ===
The decisive one in a series, e.g. the third of five (if one team has already won two) or the fifth (if both have won two).

=== payoff pitch ===
A pitch thrown with a full count. The implication is that much effort has gone into reaching this point (this is at least the sixth pitch of the at-bat), and the pitch will either pay off for the pitcher (a strikeout) or the batter (a hit or a walk). However, a foul ball can extend the at-bat. The term is most often used when a hit will score a run and a strikeout will end the inning.

=== PCL ===
A AAA minor league that formerly had "open" classification (between AAA and major league) from 1952 to 1957, now operating as under Triple-A classification in the Western United States

=== pea ===
A pitch thrown at high speed. "It was one of those lucky days when a player can hit a pea."

=== pearl ===
A brand new baseball that has been rubbed down with ball mud, causing the ball to no longer be bright white and instead is a pearl white color.

=== pearod ===
A hard line drive batted back at the pitcher. "Then first pitch to Troy Tulowitzki ...a pearod to left center, walk-off base hit, thanks for coming."

=== PECOTA ===
A system for forecasting pitcher and hitter performance developed by Nate Silver of Baseball Prospectus. A player's "PECOTA" may be the forecasted range of his performance on a variety of indicators for the current or future seasons.

=== peeking ===
When the batter tries to see the catcher's signals to the pitcher.

=== peg ===
To throw the ball to one of the bases. "The fielder pegged the ball to first."

=== pen ===
The bullpen.

=== pennant race ===
The competition to win the regular season championship in a baseball league. To win the pennant or flag, a major league baseball team must first win enough of the 162 games in the regular season to reach the playoffs. Then it must win the league division series (LDS) and the league championship series (LCS). See American League Division Series (ALDS), American League Championship Series (ALCS), National League Division Series (NLDS), and National League Championship Series (NLCS).

=== pepper ===
A common pre-game exercise, where one player bunts to a nearby group of fielders; they throw it back as quickly as possible.

=== percentage points ===
If Team A is in first place by less than half a game over Team B, Team B is said to be "within percentage points" of Team A.

=== perfect game ===
A special type of no-hitter where each batter is retired consecutively, allowing no baserunners via walks, errors, or any other means. In short, "27 up, 27 down". A perfect game could involve multiple pitchers with one pitcher relieving another, but in the major league they are defined as being thrown by a single pitcher.

=== perfect inning ===
An inning in which a pitcher allows no runners to reach base.

=== permanently ineligible ===
Major League Baseball's designation for someone who is banned from MLB or affiliated minor league clubs, for misconduct. Permanently ineligible players are also ineligible for induction into the Hall of Fame. Banned individuals may be reinstated at the discretion of the Commissioner of Baseball.

=== PFP ===
A commonly used acronym for Pitchers' Fielding Practice. A session in which pitchers practice fielding bunts and other ground balls, throwing to a base, and covering first base and home plate.

=== phantom ballplayer ===
Someone who is incorrectly listed in source materials as playing in a Major League Baseball game, although they did not actually play.

=== phantom tag ===
an erroneous call by an umpire in which a baserunner is ruled as having been tagged out when in fact the fielder never legally tagged the runner.

=== pick it clean ===
To field a sharply hit ground ball without bobbling it.

=== pick me up ===
Having made a mistake or failed an attempt, a player may ask a teammate, "Pick me up." Said in praise by a pitcher, "The guys picked me up with a lot of runs today."

=== pick up the pitch ===
A batter's ability to detect what kind of pitch is being thrown.

=== picket fence ===
A series of 1's on the scoreboard, resembling a picket fence.

=== pickle ===
A rundown.

=== pickoff ===
A quick throw from the pitcher (or sometimes the catcher) to a fielder covering a base when the ball has not been hit into play.

=== pill ===
The baseball.

=== pimping ===
Acting ostentatiously or showboating to gain the attention or approval of the fans. See grandstand play.

=== pinch hitter ===
A substitute batter, brought in during a critical situation ("a pinch").

=== pinch runner ===
A substitute baserunner, brought in during a critical situation ("a pinch").

=== pine tar ===
Pine tar, which is notoriously sticky, improves a batter's grip on the bat. See Pine Tar Incident.

=== pink hat ===
A fan of a team who is perceived to be merely "jumping on the bandwagon" as opposed to a more loyal, knowledgeable fan (of either gender).

=== pinpoint control ===
A pitcher who is able to throw the ball to a precise spot in the strike zone has "pinpoint control". See control pitcher.

=== pitch ===
A baseball delivered by the pitcher from the pitcher's mound to the batter as defined by the Official Rules of Baseball, Rule 2.00 (Pitch) and Rule 8.01.

=== pitch around ===
To repeatedly miss the strike zone hoping the batter will "chase one". Also, deliberately walking him.

=== pitch count ===
How many times a pitcher has thrown thus far (this game).

=== pitch to ===
The opposite of pitching around, i.e. throwing every pitch into the strike zone.

=== pitch to contact ===
A pitcher who doesn't try to strike out batters but instead tries to get them to hit the ball weakly, especially on the ground, is said to pitch to contact.

=== pitch tracking ===
The use of technology and analytics to evaluate pitching, including information such as pitch velocity, spin rate, and break (curve).

=== pitcher ===
The fielder responsible for pitching the ball. Prior to 1884, the rules specified that the ball was to be "pitched, not thrown to the bat", i.e. underhand.

=== pitcher of record ===
See Win–loss record (pitching)

=== pitcher's best friend ===
Nickname for a double play.

=== pitchers' duel ===
A very low-scoring game in which both starting pitchers allow few batters to reach base.

=== pitcher's mound ===
The mound, or colloquially the hill or the bump.

=== pitcher's park ===
A park in which pitchers tend to perform better than they perform on average in all other parks; inverse of hitter's park. See park factor.

- When the wind is blowing "in" at Wrigley Field, it is typically rendered a "pitcher's park", and a low score for one or both teams is not unusual. Under those circumstances, no-hitters also become possible at a park many fans normally think of as a "hitter's park".
- Because of its large foul area (recently shrunk to add more seating), symmetrical outfield walls, and small "corners" near the foul poles, Dodger Stadium is traditionally known as a pitcher's park, especially at night, when fly balls tend to die more quickly than they do during the day.

=== pitcher's plate ===
Official term for the rubber.

=== pitcher's pitch ===
The pitch the pitcher wants hit because he knows it will still most likely result in an out.

=== pitcher's spot ===
In games where the designated hitter rule is not in effect, or in DH rule games where a team has forfeited its DH, this term refers to the pitcher's turn in the batting order; its usage usually implies there is some possibility that the pitcher will not actually take his turn batting and instead will be replaced by a pinch hitter and by rule a relief pitcher.

=== pitching from behind ===
When a pitcher frequently falls behind in the count, he finds himself pitching from behind.

=== pitchout ===
A defensive tactic used to pick off a baserunner, typically employed when the defense thinks a stolen base play is planned. The pitch is thrown outside and the catcher catches it while standing, and can quickly throw to a base.

=== pivot foot ===
The pivot foot is the foot which remains in contact with the pitcher's plate from the moment he intentionally engages the plate and during the pitcher's delivery motion. It will be the same foot as the throwing arm, e.g., a right-handed pitcher's pivot foot will be his right foot. To legally disengage from the pitcher's plate after intentionally coming in contact to take a legal pitching position, the pitcher is required to step backwards with his pivot foot. Failure to do so with runners on base is a balk.

=== pivot man ===
Generally refers to the second baseman. A second baseman often has to turn or pivot on one foot in order to complete a double play. A short-stop also sometimes pivots to complete such a play.

=== PL or P.L. ===
Abbreviation for Players' League, a one-year (1890) major league.

=== place hitter ===
A batter who has skill in controlling where he hits the ball.

=== plate ===
- As a noun, plate usually connotes home plate. There is also a pitcher's plate, but it is more commonly referred to as the rubber.
- As a verb, plate means to score a run. "In the fourth our defense continued to hold and we managed to plate a couple runs in the bottom half of the inning to tie the game at 3."

=== plate appearance ===
Any turn at bat is considered a plate appearance for computing stats such as on-base percentage, and for determining whether a batter has enough of them (minimum 3.1 X number of scheduled games) to qualify for the batting average championship. Plate appearances consist of standard at-bats plus situations where there is no at-bat charged, such as a base on balls or a sacrifice. However, if the batter is standing in the batter's box and the third out is made elsewhere (for example, by a caught-stealing or by an appeal play), then it does not count as an appearance, because that same batter will lead off the next inning.

=== plate discipline ===
A batter shows "plate discipline" by not swinging at pitches that are out of the strike zone, nor at pitches that are in the strike zone but not where he knows he can hit it. Such a batter might be described as a patient hitter.

=== platinum sombrero ===
When a batter strikes out five times in one game. Also called Olympic Rings.

=== platoon ===
- The practice of assigning two players to the same defensive position during a season, normally to complement a batter who hits well against left-handed pitchers with one who hits well against righties. Individual players may also find themselves marked as a platoon player, based on their hitting against righties vs. against lefties. Casey Stengel brought some attention to the system by using it frequently during his New York Yankees' run of five consecutive World Series champions during 1949–1953.
- "Platooning" sometimes refers to the in-game strategic replacement of batters in the line-up based on the handedness of a newly inserted relief pitcher, or conversely the strategic insertion of a relief pitcher to face a batter of the same hand. This is the logic behind having a LOOGY on the roster, for example. The LOOGY is to pitching what a pinch-hitter is to batting: put into the line-up for short-term strategic advantage.

=== platter ===
Home plate.

=== play ===
- Any small sequence of events during a game, never lasting long enough to contain more than one pitch, during which at least one offensive player could advance, or score a run, or tag up, etc., or could be put out. This includes, for example, a pop foul, during which it is possible for the batter to be put out, but advancing is not possible and neither is scoring. This term, "play", is mentioned (appears) in the article about the definition of an error.
- Where the action is focused at a given time, in particular where a runner is about to reach a base or reach home, and the defense is attempting to get him out. An announcer might declare "There's a play at home", for example, if a runner is attempting to score and the catcher is about to receive a throw and attempt to tag the runner out.
- Also see in play.

=== play by the book ===
To follow the conventional wisdom in game strategy and player use. For example, when to bunt or when to bring in the closer.

=== player to be named later ===
A "player to be named later" (PTBNL) is a mystery player in a baseball trade. The teams agree on a future date to decide who the PTBNL will be. This can be a minor leaguer, a cash payment, or even someone already on the trading team's roster.

=== players' manager ===
A manager who is close to his players and whom the players consider a peer and a friend. The knock on players' managers is that they tend to not be disciplinarians and find it hard to make a tough decision in the team's best interest. Thus the term is not always complimentary, and many managers find they must maintain some aloofness in order to be effective. Joe Torre is often referred to as a player's manager; his approach can be effective with mature players who take their responsibilities seriously. Casey Stengel used to say the secret to managing was "to keep the guys who are neutral about you away from the guys that hate your guts."

=== playing back ===
The usual position depth taken by infielders when they're not anticipating a bunt or setting up for a double play.

=== playing in ===
When the infield is shallower than normal in order to attempt to throw out a runner on third-base on a ground ball. This does not allow the infielders to cover as much ground however, and can turn a routine ground ball into a base hit.

=== playoffs ===
- All the series played after the end of the 162-game regular season. This includes the American League Division Series, National League Division Series, American League Championship Series, National League Championship Series, and the World Series.
- Any short set or series of games played after the regular season to determine a division or league champion. Also called the "post-season". Technically speaking, if a one-game playoff is required to determine who wins the regular season or the wild card (and thereby qualifies for the post-season) is counted as part of the regular season.

=== plunked ===
Hit by a pitch.

=== plus ===
The plus sign (+) is an indicator that a starting pitcher began an inning and faced at least one hitter without recording an out. In the box score, the pitcher is said to have pitched x+ innings, where x is the number of innings completed in the game. For example, if the starter gives up two walks to lead off the sixth inning and is pulled for a reliever, "5+" innings is recorded in the box score.

=== plus pitch ===
A pitch that is better than above average when compared to the rest of the league. Often the strikeout pitch.

=== plus plus pitch ===
A pitch that is among the best of its type in the league and is essentially unhittable when thrown well. Often a breaking pitch.

=== plus player ===
A player with above-average major league skills. A term from baseball scouting and player evaluation. See also 5-tool player.

=== poke ===
A hit. Referring to an extra-base hit or home run, a fan or announcer might exclaim, "That was quite a poke." A reporter might record a line drive as "Cameron pokes a shot into left field."

=== pop ===
- A batter with "pop" has exceptional bat speed and power. "Reggie popped one" implies that Reggie hit a home run. Example in baseball writing: "Ian Kinsler Proves He Has Pop to Center".
- A pop-up is a batted ball that is hit very high and stays in the infield. Called a pop-foul when it falls or is caught in foul territory. Example: "Rondini popped it foul out of play" implies that Rondini hit a pop-up or pop-foul that went into the stands where a defender couldn't reach it.
- Brendan C. Boyd and Fred C. Harris, in their impish commentary in The Great American Baseball Card Flipping, Trading and Bubble Gum Book, discussed a player who was known for hitting sky-high popups and said that "he could have played his career in a stovepipe".

=== portsider ===
A left-handed pitcher, so named because "port" refers to the left side of a ship. Synonym: southpaw

=== position ===
- One of the nine defensive positions on a baseball team, consisting of (in scorekeepers' numerical order): (1) pitcher, (2) catcher, (3) first baseman, (4) second baseman, (5) third baseman, (6) shortstop, (7) left fielder, (8) center fielder, (9) right fielder. Positions 3 through 6 are called infield positions. Positions 7, 8, and 9 are outfield positions. The pitcher and catcher are the battery. For purposes of the infield fly rule the pitcher and catcher are counted as infielders, and such a broader definition of infielders is commonly used, if only to differentiate them from outfielders. Players in positions 2 through 9—all positions except the pitcher—are position players.
- A defensive player also positions himself differently—sets up in a different location on the field while playing his position—depending on who is pitching, who is at bat, whether runners are on base, the number of outs, and the score of the game.

=== position player ===
Any defensive player other than the pitcher.

=== post-season ===
The playoffs.

=== pound the batter inside ===
To pitch the ball over the inside of the plate, in on his hands, typically with a fastball.

=== pound the strike zone ===
See attack the strike zone.

=== powder river ===
A fastball with extreme velocity.

=== power alleys ===
Either of the two areas in the outfield between the outfielders, i.e. left-center field and right-center field. The furthest dimensions may not be marked on the wall.

=== power hitter ===
A powerful batter who hits many home runs and extra base hits, but who may not have a high batting average, due to an "all or nothing" hitting approach. Dave Kingman is perhaps the best example of an "all power, low batting average" slugger. See slugger and slugging percentage.

=== power outage ===
When a batter with a high slugging average suddenly appears to have lost that ability, he is "having a power outage".

=== power pitcher ===
A pitcher who relies heavily on his fastball. Control pitchers and contact pitchers rely more on variety and location than velocity.

=== power stroke ===
A hitter with a good power stroke is one who typically gets extra bases.

=== power surge ===
When a batter with a low slugging percentage suddenly appears to have gained that ability, he is "having a power surge".

=== pow wow ===
A meeting on the mound between a coach and players to discuss strategy. See tea party.

=== prep ===
A prep player is a draft prospect who is still in high school, e.g. "Nationals select prep right-hander Lucas Giolito 16th overall."

=== pro ball ===
Used to refer to both major and minor leagues, especially on trading cards. For example, "Complete Professional Record" would include major and minor league seasons while "Complete Major League Record" would not. (Minor league players consider it an insult if asked when they'll "get to the pros".)

=== probable pitcher ===
A pitcher who is scheduled to start the next game or one of the next few games is often described as a "probable pitcher".

=== productive out ===
When a batter makes an out but advances one or more runners in the process, he has made a productive out. In contrast, a strikeout or other out in which no runners advance is unproductive. Popularized by sportswriter Buster Olney and Elias Sports Bureau beginning in 2004.

=== projectable ===
A scouting term for a young player with excellent tools who appears likely to develop into a productive or more powerful player in the future.

=== protested game ===
A manager may protest a game if he believes an umpire's decision is in violation of the official rules. An umpire's judgment call (i.e., balls and strikes, safe or out, fair or foul) may not be protested.

=== pull ===
- To pull the ball is to hit it toward the side of the field usually associated with a full swing: a right-handed hitter pulls it left and a left-handed hitter pulls it right.
- To pull a hitter is to substitute a pinch hitter.
- To pull a pitcher is to relieve him. See hook.
- To pull the string is to throw a changeup, inducing the hitter to swing early in anticipation of a fastball, thereby creating the impression of having pulled the ball back, like a yo-yo.

=== Punch and Judy ===
A "Punch and Judy hitter" has very little power.

=== punch out ===
A strikeout. Named such because the umpire will typically make a punching-like signal on the third strike, especially if the batter does not swing at the pitch.

=== purpose pitch ===
A brushback, intended to make the batter move away from home plate. A batter targeted by such a pitch is sometimes said to get a close shave. 1950s pitcher Sal Maglie was called "the Barber" due to his frequent use of such pitches. A sportswriting wag once stated that its "purpose" was "to separate the head from the shoulders".

=== push ===
- A right-handed batter who hits the ball toward right field, ditto left, has "pushed" it.
- The best situation for a "push bunt" is runners at first and third with one out (or no outs); if successful, the result will be a run scored, a runner on second, and two outs (or one).

=== put a charge on the ball ===
To hit the ball very hard, typically for a home run.

=== put a hurt ===
- To hit the ball extremely hard.
- To beat another team, especially by a decisive score.

=== put away ===
- A fielder who catches a fly ball, or who tags a runner may be said to "put away" his opponent. Similarly, a pitcher may "put away" a batter by striking him out.
- A team may "put away" its opponent by making a decisive play or out, or by breaking open the game and gaining a substantial lead.

== Q ==
=== qualifier ===
A qualifier is a batter or pitcher that has played enough to be eligible for a percentage-based league leaderboard. In Major League Baseball (MLB), batters become eligible for the league leaderboards in batting average, on-base percentage, slugging percentage, and on-base plus slugging percentage once they've taken at least 3.1 plate appearances per game played by their team, extrapolated to a total of 502 plate appearances for a standard 162-game season. MLB pitchers become eligible for league leaderboards in earned run average (ERA), walks plus hits per inning pitched (WHIP), and batting average against once their innings pitched is greater than or equal to the number of games their team has played, setting a minimum of 162 innings pitched for a 162-game season. Players must be qualifiers in order to win a batting title or an ERA title.

=== quality at bat ===
An at bat in which the batter is productive, whether that involves advancing a runner with a sacrifice bunt (or even a ground ball out), getting on base, or just making the pitcher throw a lot. Thus a quality at bat is not measured simply by the standard batting statistics such as batting average, on-base percentage, or slugging average. Minnesota Twins catcher Joe Mauer: "Seeing a lot of pitches, fighting bad pitches off – basically, just waiting for a pitch you can handle. Whether you're a power guy, or more of a slap hitter guy, if you find a pitch you're comfortable in handling, that's a quality at-bat. If you get on base or drive a ball up the gap, you pretty much know you had a good plate appearance. But it's mostly about making sure you get your pitch."

=== quality start ===
When a starter pitches at least six complete innings and allows three or fewer earned runs – even in a loss. A pitcher can perform well yet not be involved in the win–loss "decision". This statistic was developed by sportswriter John Lowe to capture an aspect of pitcher performance that is not part of the standard statistics collected by Major League Baseball. It is catching on among baseball players and management, but also has some skeptics. Former Houston Astros manager Jimy Williams was said to hate this statistic. "Quality start?" he would harumph. "Quality means you win."

=== quick pitch ===
An illegal pitch where the ball is thrown before the batter is reasonably set in the batter's box. (Official Rules of Baseball, Rule 6.02(a)(5)) If there is no one on base, the pitch is called a ball, but if there are any number of runners on base, it is ruled a balk. The ruling of a quick pitch is a judgement call by the umpire(s).

=== quiet bats ===
When a pitcher prevents the opposing hitters from getting a lot of hits, or big hits, he's said to have "quieted some bats". "Iowa's starting pitcher, Jarred Hippen, was able to quiet the Spartans' bats the rest of the way to seal the victory." Headline: "Miscues, Quiet Bats, Cost D-Backs".

=== quiet swing ===
A batter who holds his head, hands, and bat very still while awaiting the pitch may be said to have a quiet swing. "Hideki Matsui's quiet swing and stance are a big part of the reason why he is able to hit for both power and average."

== R ==
=== rabbit ears ===
Indicates a participant in the game who hears things perhaps too well for their own good. A player who becomes nervous or chokes when opposing players or fans yell at or razz them is said to have rabbit ears. Also, an umpire who picks up on every complaint hurled at them from the dugouts is described this way.

=== rag arm ===
A player, typically a pitcher, with a weak arm. "I hope the Cubs did not give up an actual Major League player for this rag-arm home-run machine."

=== railroad ===
To run into and knock over the catcher when running home from third base, or to run into a first-baseman when running from home to first. In either case, neither the catcher nor the first baseman may be able to duck out of the way because he must play the ball and stay in position in order to make an out.

=== rain delay ===
Rain delay refers to situations when a game starts late due to rain or is temporarily suspended due to rain. A game that is suspended after it has begun may be resumed either the same day or at a later date. A game that never begins, or that is canceled after it begins, due to rain is a rainout and in most cases will be rescheduled for a later date – a make-up date. In the event of a non-tie game past the 5th inning with heavy inclement weather, the game may be called with the winner being the team that was ahead at the end of the last completed inning (except during the MLB postseason).

=== rainbow ===
A curveball with a high arc in its path to the plate.

=== rainout ===
A rainout refers to a game that is canceled or stopped in progress due to rain. Generally, Major League Baseball teams will continue play in light to moderate rain but will suspend play if it is raining heavily or if there is standing water on the field. Games can also be delayed or canceled for other forms of inclement weather, or if the field is found to be unfit for play. If a game is rained out before play begins, a make-up game is rescheduled for a later date. If a game is called after play begins but before 4½ innings have been completed (if the home team is ahead) or five innings have been completed (if the visitors are ahead or the game is tied), the game is not an official game. The umpire declares "No Game", the game is played in its entirety at a later date, and statistics compiled during the game are not counted. Games that are stopped after they become official games count in the standings (unless the game is tied, in which case it is replayed from the beginning), and statistics compiled during the game are counted. In the MLB postseason, however, games that are called before 4 1/2 innings have been completed are treated as suspended games, and fans are usually given a rain check to attend another game.

=== rake ===
To hit the ball really hard, and all over the park. When you're raking, you're hitting very well. "Mike Gosling allowed one run on five hits over 6 1/3 innings and Alex Terry raked Pawtucket pitching for 14 hits as the Bats defeated the Red Sox, 7–1, in an International League game Wednesday."

=== rally ===
To come back from a deficit. This typically occurs in the final innings of a game.

=== rally cap ===
A cap worn backwards, sideways, or inside-out by fans or players to bring a rally. Said to have originated by fans of the New York Mets during the 1985 baseball season, when the Mets captured several dramatic come-from-behind victories, and spread to the players themselves some time during the 1986 season. It rose to national awareness during the 1986 World Series. The Mets were down three games to two and losing the deciding game to the Red Sox, when in the seventh inning, television cameras showed some of the New York Mets players in the dugout wearing their caps inside-out. The team rallied to win the game and the series.

=== range ===
A fielder's ability to move from his position to field a ball in play.

=== reach or reached ===
A batter becoming a baserunner by attaining first base without becoming out.

=== reach on error ===
A batter receives a reached on error (ROE) when he reaches base because of a defensive fielding error, meaning he wouldn't have otherwise reached. Reaching base on an error does not count as a hit, nor does it count as a time on base for purposes of on-base percentage. However, there is still significant debate as to whether ROEs are undervalued in the statistical world, as certain players have a tendency to reach base via error more than others.

=== RBI ===
- An RBI or "run batted in" is a run scored as a result of a hit; a bases-filled walk or hit-by-pitch or awarding of first base due to interference; a sacrifice; or a single-out fielder's choice (not a double play).
- Official credit to a batter for driving in a run.

=== RBI situation ===
Runners in scoring position.

=== receiver ===
Another term for catcher. Also backstop, signal caller.

=== regular season ===
- The 162-game schedule that all Major League Baseball teams usually complete. However, if a special one-game playoff is required to determine which team goes to the league division championship series (the ALDS or the NLDS), this 163rd game is also counted as part of the regular season. All team and player statistics from this game are also counted as regular season statistics. For example, if a pitcher wins his 20th game in the 163rd game played in the one-game playoff, he would be a "20 game winner" for the season. Similarly, a batter's performance in that extra game might determine whether he wins the title for best batting average or most home runs in the season.
- On occasion, teams do not complete every game of the regular season, as when playing a make-up game and the outcome of that game could not possibly help either team reach the playoffs.

=== regulation game ===
A standard baseball game lasts nine innings, although some leagues (such as high school baseball) use seven-inning games. The team with the most runs at the end of the game wins. If the home team is ahead after eight-and-a-half innings have been played, it is declared the winner, and the last half-inning is not played. If the home team is trailing or tied in the last inning and they score to take the lead, the game ends as soon as the winning run touches home plate; however, if the last batter hits a home run to win the game, he and any runners on base are all permitted to score.

If both teams have scored the same number of runs at the end of a regular-length game, a tie is avoided by the addition of extra innings. As many innings as necessary are played until one team has the lead at the end of an inning. Thus, the home team always has a chance to respond if the visiting team scores in the top half of the inning; this gives the home team a small tactical advantage. In theory, a baseball game could go on forever; in practice, however, they eventually end (although see Longest professional baseball game).

=== rehab assignment ===
When a Major League player recovering from injury or illness plays a short stint with one of the team's minor-league affiliates before coming off the disabled list. The particular affiliate may be chosen based on its proximity to the club's home town rather than the level of play. A rehab assignment does not carry the same stigma as being sent down to the minors for poor performance.

=== relay ===
A defensive technique where the ball is thrown by an outfielder to an infielder who then throws to the final target. This is done because accurate throws are more difficult over long distances and the ball loses a considerable amount of speed the farther it must be thrown. Also cut-off. Also the second throw during a double play. As in "They were only able to get the lead runner because the relay was not in time."

=== relief pitcher ===
A relief pitcher or reliever is a pitcher brought in the game as a substitute for (i.e., "to relieve") another pitcher.

=== reliever ===
A relief pitcher or reliever is a baseball or softball pitcher who enters the game after the starting pitcher is removed due to injury, ineffectiveness, ejection from the game or fatigue.

=== replacement-level player ===
A player of common skills available for minimum cost to a Major League Baseball team. A team of replacement-level players would be expected to win a baseline minimum number of games, typically 40–50, per 162-game season.

=== replacement player ===
A player who is not a member of the Major League Baseball Players Association but plays during strikes or lockouts.

=== restricted list ===
A roster designation for players who are not available, either because of a player's own action (such as declining to play or getting arrested) or when "unusual circumstances exist." Placing a player on the restricted list allows a team to remove the player from both its roster and its payroll indefinitely, while retaining its rights to the player.

=== retire the batter ===
To get the batter out.

=== retire the runner ===
To throw the runner out at a base..

=== retire the side ===
See side retired.

=== rhubarb ===
An argument or fight in a baseball game. Hence, Rhubarb, a novel by H. Allen Smith. The term was popularized by famed baseball broadcaster Red Barber.

=== ribbie, ribeye ===
Slang for a run batted in (RBI).

=== rifle ===
- A very strong arm. A cannon, a bazooka, a gun. Also used as a verb, "He rifled the ball home to catch the runner."
- A batter can also be said to rifle a ball when he hits a hard line drive. "Griffey rifles the ball ... foul, just outside first base."

=== right-handed bat ===
A baseball bat is symmetrical, thus there is no such thing as a right-handed or left-handed one. A player who bats right-handed may be referred to as a "right-handed bat" or "right-hand bat". Headline: "Can That Right Handed Bat Play Third Base?"

=== right-handed hitter ===
Also "right-hand hitter". A batter who, paradoxically, bats from the left-side of home plate.

=== ring him up ===
A strikeout. The phrase is drawn by analogy from cashiers, and from the "cha-ching" motion of a plate umpire. "Outside corner, ring him up, strike three called!"

=== rip ===
- To hit a hard line drive, as in "He ripped a single through the right side."
- A hard swing that misses the ball: "Reyes took a good rip at that pitch."

=== RISP ===
Acronym for Runners In Scoring Position. See Runner In Scoring Position.

=== RLSP ===
Acronym for Runners Left in Scoring Position, typically seen in the box score of a game. This is the sum of the number of runners left occupying second and third bases (scoring position) when the batting side has been retired.

=== road game ===
A game played away from a baseball club's home stadium. When a team plays away from home, it's on a "road trip" and is the "visiting team" at the home stadium of another team.

=== road trip ===
A series of road games or away games occurs on a road trip, a term derived from the days when teams indeed traveled from one town to another by roadway or railroad.

=== robbed ===
- When a fielder makes a spectacular play that denies a hit or a home run, the batter may be said to have "been robbed" by him. Headline: "A-Rod robbed of HR, Joba will join rotation".
- If an umpire has made a questionable call, the losing team or fans may complain they "were robbed". "Braves Robbed of a Win ... was Beltran Out at 3rd in the 9th?"

=== rocking chair ===
The position occupied by the third base umpire, likely because the third base umpire does not generally have to make as many calls as the other umpires.

=== ROOGY ===
A slightly derogatory acronym for a right-handed relief specialist. "Righty One Out GuY".

=== rookie ===
Conventionally, rookie is a term for athletes in their first year of play in their sport. In Major League Baseball, special rules apply for eligibility for the Rookie of the Year award in each league. To be eligible, a player must have accumulated:

- Fewer than 130 at bats (for hitters) and 50 innings (for pitchers) during the MLB regular season, or
- Fewer than 45 days on the active rosters of MLB clubs (excluding time on the disabled list or any time after rosters are expanded on September 1).

=== roll a pair ===
Reference to someone's saying the next play will be a double play. Also, "roll it".

=== room service ===
A ball hit directly to a fielder such that he hardly has to move to get it, or a pitch that is easy to hit.

=== rooster tail ===
A ball rolling on wet grass, kicking up water behind it.

=== rope ===
A hard line drive. Also see frozen rope. Sometimes used as a verb, "He roped one up the middle."

=== roster ===
The official list of players who are eligible to play in a given game and to be included on the lineup card for that game. Major League Baseball limits the regular-season active roster to 25 players during most of the season, but additional players may be on the disabled list, and the roster can be expanded to as many as 40 active players after August 31st by bringing up players on the 40-man roster.

=== rotation ===
A starting pitcher in professional baseball usually rests three or four days after pitching a game before pitching another. Therefore, most professional baseball teams have four or five starting pitchers on their roster. These pitchers, and the sequence in which they pitch, are known as "the rotation" or "starting rotation". In modern baseball, a five-man rotation is most common.

Often a manager identifies pitchers by their order in the rotation, "number 1", "number 2", etc. "Discussions over whether Jason Schmidt or Brad Penny is more deserving to occupy the No. 2 spot in the starting rotation behind Derek Lowe can cease, as least temporarily."

=== roughed up ===
An offense has "roughed up" the opposing pitcher when it hits his pitches hard and scores several runs. Headline: "Bauer roughed up in loss to Reds."

=== roundhouse curveball ===
A curveball that instead of breaking sharply makes a more gradual loop. "One Boston writer in the late-'40s summed up Joe Dobson's roundhouse curveball this way: 'It started out somewhere around the dugout and would end up clipping the outside corner of the plate. There are curveballs, and there are curveballs.'"

=== round-tripper ===
A home run. The analogy is to a commuter who buys a round-trip ticket from home plate to second base and back.

=== rubber ===
The rubber, formally the pitching plate, is a white rubber strip the front of which is exactly sixty feet six inches (18.4 m) from the rear point of home plate. A pitcher will push off the rubber with his foot in order to gain velocity toward home plate when pitching.

=== rubber arm ===
A pitcher is said to have a "rubber arm" if he can throw many pitches without tiring. Relief pitchers who have the ability to pitch consecutive days with the same effectiveness tend to be known as "rubber arms". Examples of these include Justin Verlander and Aroldis Chapman.

=== rubber game ===
Also referred to as a "rubber match", a term used for the last game of a series or match when the two teams have evenly split the previous games. See also rubber bridge / best-of-three playoff.

=== run ===
- A player who advances around all the bases to score is credited with a run; the team with the most runs wins the game.
- A manager "runs his players" when he calls on them to steal bases and to be generally aggressive in trying to advance extra bases when the ball is in play.
- A player or coach may be "run" by an umpire by being ejected from a game.

=== run on contact ===
See contact play.

=== run rule ===
Also known as a mercy rule or run-ahead rule, a run rule is a rule used in some leagues that automatically concludes a game in which one team is ahead by a certain number of runs after a certain number of innings.

=== rundown ===
A play in which a runner is stranded between two bases, and runs back and forth to try to avoid fielders with the ball. The fielders (usually basemen) toss the ball back and forth, to prevent the runner from getting to a base, and typically close in on him and tag him. Also called a hotbox or a pickle. Sometimes used as a baserunning strategy by a trailing runner, to distract the fielders and allow a leading runner to advance.

=== rung up ===
Being ejected from the game. Also, slang for having struck out looking.

=== runners at the corners ===
runners on 1st and 3rd, with 2nd base open.

=== runners in scoring position ===
Runners on 2nd or 3rd base are said to be in scoring position, i.e., a typical base hit should allow them to reach home. Batting average with runners in scoring position (RISP) is used as an approximation of clutch hitting. Game announcers are apt to put up and comment on the latter statistic during a broadcast to set the stage for an at bat.

=== Ruthian ===
Having the qualities of Babe Ruth, typically describing the flight of a long home run.

== S ==
=== sabermetrics ===
Sabermetrics is the analysis of baseball through objective evidence, especially baseball statistics. The term is derived from the SABR – the Society for American Baseball Research. The term was coined by Bill James, an enthusiastic proponent and its most notable figure.

=== sack ===
- Synonymous with bag—1st, 2nd, or 3rd base.
- A player who plays a particular base might be called a sacker. Most often this is the second sacker (second baseman). Together the second sacker and the short-stop may be referred to as sackmates because they often coordinate or share the coverage or play at second base. See double play.

=== sacrifice bunt ===
A sacrifice bunt (also called a sacrifice hit or simply a "sacrifice") is the act of deliberately bunting the ball in a manner that allows a runner on base to advance to another base, while the batter is himself put out. If the sacrifice is successful, the batter is not charged with an at bat (AB). But he is credited with an SAC or S or SH.

=== sacrifice fly ===
When a batter hits a fly ball to the outfield which is caught for an out, but a runner scores from 3rd base after tagging up or touching the bag following the catch. The batter is credited with an RBI and is not charged with an at bat. Also referred to as "sac fly", abbreviated as SF.

=== safety ===
A base hit or "base knock". Getting "safely on (first) base" after hitting the ball without the interposition of a fielding error.

=== safety squeeze ===
A squeeze play in which the runner on third waits for the batter to lay down a successful bunt before breaking for home. Contrast this with the suicide squeeze.

=== salad ===
An easily handled pitch.

=== salami ===
A grand slam.

=== Sally League ===
The South Atlantic League ("SAL"), a Class A minor baseball league with teams located mainly in the southeastern United States.

=== sandwich round ===
A round of drafts that occurs between the first and second rounds, and again between the second and the third, comprising solely compensatory drafts granted to teams that failed to sign their first or second round draft picks of the year before.

=== save ===
In baseball statistics, save (abbreviated SV, or sometimes, S) is the successful maintenance of a lead by a relief pitcher, usually the closer, until the end of the game. A save is credited to a pitcher who fulfills the following three conditions:
1. The pitcher is the last pitcher in a game won by his team;
2. The pitcher is not the winning pitcher (For instance, if a starting pitcher throws a complete game win or, alternatively, if the pitcher gets a blown save and then his team scores a winning run while he is the pitcher of record, sometimes known as a "vulture win".);
3. The pitcher fulfills at least one of the following three conditions:
  1. He comes into the game with a lead of no more than three runs.
  2. He comes into the game with the potential tying run being either on base, at bat, or on deck.
  3. He pitches effectively for at least three innings after entering the game with a lead and finishes the game.
- If the pitcher surrenders the lead at any point, he cannot get a save, even if his team comes back to win. No more than one save may be credited in each game.
- If a relief pitcher satisfies all the criteria for a save, except he does not finish the game, he will often be credited with a hold.
- The final criterion in the third rule can be contentious, as "effectively" is subject to the judgment of the official scorer.
  - That criterion can also lead to a save being awarded even when a lead is not in jeopardy. For example, on August 22, 2007, the Texas Rangers beat the Baltimore Orioles by a 30–3 score. The winning pitcher, Kason Gabbard, pitched six innings, and left the game with a 14–3 lead. The Rangers' relief pitcher, Wes Littleton, pitched three scoreless innings, while his team went on to score another 16 runs, including six runs in the 9th inning. Although his team held a lead of more than 10 runs during the entire time he pitched, Littleton pitched effectively, thus was awarded a save.
- Generally, a save situation is when a pitcher enters the game in the seventh inning or later with a lead of three runs or fewer, or with the potential tying run in the on-deck circle. Most of the time, the saving pitcher pitches one or more innings. Also called a save opportunity.

=== saw off ===
When a pitcher gets a batter to hit the ball on the handle, and the batter hits the ball weakly or even breaks his bat, the pitcher may be said to have sawed off the bat. "If the bat handles are getting "sawed off" in players' hands or shattering into splinters, it's because players are ordering bats too thin to withstand the impact of a 90 mile-per-hour fast ball."

=== scoring position ===
A runner on 2nd or 3rd base is in scoring position, as he is presumed to have a good chance to score on a base hit to the outfield.

=== scratch hit ===
A weakly hit ground ball that eludes the infielders and leads to a base hit. A bleeder.

=== screaming line drive ===
Also a screamer. A line drive that is hit extremely hard, perhaps hard enough to knock the glove out of the hand of a fielder or to be so hard that the pitcher cannot get out of the way before he is hit by the ball. "I distinctly remember watching the game where Jon Matlack was hit in the head by a screaming line drive off the bat of Marty Perez and it bounced off his head. I also remember watching the night Cal Ripken hit a screamer right into Andy Pettitte's mouth. Both were a nauseating sight but this one must have been much worse. Baseball can be a dangerous game for the players and also the spectators."

=== screwball ===
A pitch that curves to the same side as the side from which it was thrown. For a right-hand pitcher, the ball would break to the pitcher's right—it would break "in" to a right-hand hitter. SYNONYMS: reverse curve, fadeaway, fader, screwgie, scroogie, reverse curveball.

=== seal the win ===
To finish off the opposing team and end the game. "Red Sox closer Jonathan Papelbon nearly blew the game with a walk and an error, so he had plenty to celebrate when he then whiffed the dangerous Tampa Bay trio of Carlos Peña, B. J. Upton and Carl Crawford to seal the win". See also nailed and shuts the door.

=== seamer ===
- two-seamer – a "two seam fastball" where the ball is held by the pitcher such that, when thrown, its rotation shows only two seams per revolution
- four-seamer – like a two-seamer, but the rotation shows four seams per revolution.

=== season ===
The period from the first to the last scheduled game of a year. Typically, the major league baseball season runs from about April 1 until the end of October, including the "regular season" 162 games that each team plays and the play-offs, including the World Series. Baseball team and player records are also kept on a "seasonal" basis. "Sandy Koufax ended his career with four of the best seasons in history".

The post-season, including divisional and league series plus the World Series, is sometimes called the "Second Season."

=== seasoning ===
The time-period when a struggling major-league player is temporarily sent down to the minors (most likely AAA) in the hope that the player can improve his skills enough to return to the major-league club. This can also refer more broadly to the time that a team keeps a young up-and-coming player in the minor-leagues, so as to give the player time to continue to develop their skills, before they are brought up to the major leagues.

=== secondary pitch ===
Any non-fastball pitch type.

=== secondary lead ===
The distance a baserunner strays from the base after the pitch is thrown when he is not attempting to steal. The aim of the secondary lead is for the runner to get as far as possible off the base in the event the ball is hit while still being able to return safely to the base if the ball is not hit.

=== seed ===
Any hit that is hit so hard it barely has an arc on it. See rip. Also refers to any thrown ball with the same characteristic, typically in the infield.

=== seeing-eye ball ===
A batted ground ball that just eludes capture by an infielder, just out of infielder's range, as if it could "see" where it needed to go. Less commonly used for a ball that takes an unusual lateral bounce to elude an infielder. Sometimes called a seeing-eye single. See ground ball with eyes.

=== send a runner ===
If a coach signals for a runner to attempt to steal a base, he is "sending" a runner. Similarly, a third-base coach who signals to a runner who is approaching third base that he should turn toward home plate and attempt to score, the coach is "sending" the runner home.

=== senior circuit ===
The National League, so-called because it is the older of the two major leagues, founded in 1876. As opposed to the Junior Circuit, the American League, which was founded in 1901.

=== sent down ===
A major league player may be sent down or demoted to a minor league team either before or during the season. When this occurs during the season, another player is usually called up or promoted from the minor leagues or placed on the active roster after being removed from the disabled list.

=== sent to the showers ===
When a pitcher is removed from the lineup, he is sometimes said to be "sent to the showers" because his work for the day is done. Theoretically it is possible for him to be removed as pitcher and kept in the lineup as a designated hitter or even as a position player. But this is a very rare occurrence in the professional game, and is more frequent in the amateur game, especially in NCAA competition.

=== series ===
- A set of games between two teams. During the regular season, teams typically play 3- or 4-game series against one another, with all the games in each series played in the same park. The set of all games played between two teams during the regular season is referred to as the season series. For games played between teams in a single league, the regular season series includes an equal number of games in the home parks of each team. Its purpose is to minimize travel costs and disruptions in the very long major league baseball season.
- In the playoffs, series involve games played in the home stadiums of both teams. Teams hope to gain from having a home field advantage by playing the first game(s) in their own ballpark.

=== serve ===
To throw a pitch that gets hit hard, typically for a home run (as if the pitcher had intentionally "served up" an easy one).

=== set position ===
The posture a pitcher takes immediately before pitching. His hands are together in front of him and he is holding the ball in his pitching hand. His rear foot is on the rubber.

=== set the table ===
To get runners on base ahead of the power hitters in the lineup.

=== setup man ===
A relief pitcher who is consistently used immediately before the closer.

=== seventh-inning stretch ===
The period between the top and bottom of the seventh inning, when the fans present traditionally stand up to stretch their legs. A sing-along of the song "Take Me Out to the Ball Game" has become part of this tradition, a practice most associated with Chicago broadcaster Harry Caray. Since the September 11, 2001 attacks in the United States, "God Bless America" is sometimes played in addition to, or in lieu of, "Take Me Out to the Ball Game" in remembrance of those who lost their lives in the attacks, especially at home games of the New York Yankees and New York Mets. This occurs on Opening Day, Memorial Day, July 4, Labor Day, September 11th, Sundays and during the All-Star Game, and post-season including the World Series. In Milwaukee, fans often sing "Roll Out the Barrel" after the traditional song, while Boston fans sing "Sweet Caroline" and Baltimore fans sing along to "Thank God I'm a Country Boy". At Kaufmann Stadium, Royals fans sing "Friends in Low Places". "OK Blue Jays" is sung at Toronto Blue Jays home games.

=== shade ===
A player (usually an outfielder) who positions himself slightly away from his normal spot in the field based on a prediction of where the batter might hit the ball he is said to "shade" toward right or left.

=== shag ===
Catching fly balls in the outfield when not involved in actual baseball games. "While the other pitchers looked bored just shagging flies, he was busting a few dance moves to the music coming over the loudspeakers."

=== shake off ===
- A player, typically a pitcher, who has a bad game or series, may be said to be trying to shake off the experience and regain his usual performance level. Detroit News headline: "Miner Tries to Shake Off Poor Start".
- A pitcher who disagrees with the catcher's call for the next pitch may shake off the sign by shaking his head "no", thereby telling the catcher to call for a different pitch. If the pitcher shakes off several signs in a row, the catcher may call time out and walk to the mound to talk to the pitcher.

=== shell ===
A pitcher who is giving up numerous hits, especially extra-base hits, is said to be getting shelled – as if under siege by enemy artillery.

=== shift ===
Where all infielders and/or outfielders position themselves clockwise or counter-clockwise from their usual position. This is to anticipate a batted ball from a batter who tends to hit to one side of the field. Also shade. In the case of some batters, especially with left-handed batters and the bases empty, managers have been known to shift fielders from the left side to the right side of the diamond. The most extreme case was the famous "Ted Williams shift" (also once called the "Lou Boudreau shift"). Cleveland Indians manager Boudreau moved six of seven fielders (including himself, the shortstop) to the right of second base, leaving just the leftfielder playing shallow, and daring Teddy Ballgame to single to left rather than trying to "hit it where they ain't" somewhere on the right side. Williams saw it as a challenge, a game within The Game, and seldom hit the ball to left on purpose in that circumstance.

=== shine ball ===
One way for a pitcher to doctor the ball is to rub one area of the ball hard to affect the ball's flight toward the plate.

=== shoestring catch ===
When a fielder, usually an outfielder, catches a ball just before it hits the ground ("off his shoetops"), and remains running while doing so.

=== short hop ===
A ball that bounces immediately in front of an infielder. If the batter is a fast runner, an infielder may intentionally "short hop the ball" (take the ball on the short hop) to hasten his throw to first base. Balls may be short-hopped to turn a double play, but it may backfire sometimes. For example, Carlos Guillén had a ground ball that bounced to him, and he short hopped it; however, it went off his glove and went high in the air.

=== short porch ===
When one of the outfield walls is closer to home plate than normal, the stadium may be said to have a short porch. For example, Yankee Stadium has long had a short porch in right field.

=== short reliever ===
A relief pitcher who pitches two innings or less, late in the game, often to a few batters in one inning.

=== short rest ===
When a pitcher starts games with just a three- or four-day break, instead of the typical five between starts, he is said to have had a short rest. "The big story Tuesday night, by a long shot, was Dallas Keuchel pitching six shutout innings. In the Bronx. On short rest".

=== shorten his swing ===
See "cut down on his swing".

=== shorten the game ===
A team that has a strong staff of relief pitchers is sometimes said to have the ability to shorten games: "The Tigers will be fearsome postseason opponents because of their bullpen's ability to shorten games." If the team gets ahead in the first six innings, its bullpen can be counted on to hold the lead; thus the opponent needs to grab an early lead to still have a chance in the last few innings to win the game.

=== shot ===
- A home run, as in "Ryan Howard's 2-run shot gives him 39 home runs for the year."

=== the show ===
The major leagues. Particularly "in the Show". Or in "the Bigs" (big leagues, major leagues).

=== show bunt ===
When a batter changes his stance so that he appears ready to bunt the ball, he's said to "show bunt". Sometimes this move is intended to make the infielders creep in toward home plate, but the hitter swings away instead. And sometimes it's intended to cause the pitcher to change his pitch. See also butcher boy.

=== show me ===
- An easy-to-hit ball thrown by a pitcher to a batter who has fouled off many balls in that particular at-bat, so risking an excessive pitch count. While the likelihood of an extra-base hit is high, there is also a chance that the batter will strike out or put the ball in play where it can be fielded. Either way, a show-me pitch usually finishes the at-bat quickly.
- Also used to describe a specific pitch in a pitcher's repertoire that is weaker than their other offerings, particularly one that is rarely thrown. "Mahle's slider has always been more show-me pitch than put-away weapon."

=== shutdown inning ===
When a pitcher allows zero runs immediately after his team has scored.

=== shutout ===
According to the Dickson dictionary, the term derives from horseracing, in which a bettor arrives at the window too late to place a bet, due to the race already having started, so the bettor is said to be "shut out" (this specific usage was referenced in the film The Sting).

- A team shuts out its opponent when it prevents them from scoring any runs in a given game.
- "Santana shut out the Royals with a 3-hitter" means that the Royals went scoreless as Santana pitched a complete-game shutout. The pitcher or pitchers on the winning team thus get statistical credit for an individual shutout or a combined-to-pitch-shutout, respectively.

=== shuts the door ===
When a pitcher, generally the closer, finishes the ballgame with a save or makes the last out (or fails to do so): "No one from the Brandeis bullpen was able to shut the door in the top of the ninth in Tuesday's game." Also used more generally to refer to a victory: "Edwin Díaz shuts the door and closes the game for the Mets."

=== side retired ===
When the third out of an inning is called, the "side is retired" and the other team takes its turn at bat. A pitcher or a defensive team can be said to have "retired the side". The goal of any pitcher is to face just three batters and make three outs: to "retire the side in order", have a "one-two-three inning", or have "three up, three down".

=== sidearmer ===
A pitcher who throws with a sidearm motion, i.e., not a standard overhanded delivery.

=== sign ===
Non-verbal gestures used by catchers and coaches to communicate team strategy:

- A catcher is said to call the game by sending signs to the pitcher calling for a particular pitch. After he moves into his crouch, the catcher gives the sign by placing his non-glove hand between his legs and using his fist, fingers, wags, or taps against his inner thigh to tell the pitcher what type of pitch to throw (fastball, curve, etc.) as well as the location. A pitcher may shake off (shake his head "no" to) the initial sign or nod in agreement when he receives the sign that he wants before going into his windup. If there is a runner on second base, a catcher may change the location of his glove (from his knee to the ground, for example) to signal the pitcher that he is using an alternate set of signs so that the runner won't be able to steal the sign.
- A coach sends signs to players on the field, typically using a sequence of hand movements. He may send signs to offensive players, including batters and runners, about what to do on the next pitch—for example, to sacrifice bunt, to take or to swing away at the next pitch; to steal a base; or to execute a hit-and-run. He may send signs to the catcher to call for a pitchout or to intentionally walk the batter.

=== single ===
A one-base hit.

=== sinker ===
A pitch, typically a fastball, that breaks sharply downward as it crosses the plate. Also see drop ball.

=== sitting on a pitch ===
A batter who is waiting for a particular type of pitch before swinging at it. He may be sitting in wait for, say, a curveball or a change-up, or a pitch thrown in a certain location, and he won't swing at anything else even if it's down the middle of the plate. Sometimes hitters who know a pitcher's pattern of pitches, or what type of pitch he likes to throw in a given count, sit on that particular pitch. This approach stems from the advice Rogers Hornsby gave to Ted Williams, telling him that the secret to hitting was simply to "wait for a good pitch to hit".

=== situational hitting ===
When a batter changes his strategy depending on the game situation: the inning, number of outs, number of men on base, or the score. He may not swing for the fences or even try to get a base hit, but instead make a sacrifice bunt or try to get a sacrifice fly or make contact with the ball in some other way.

=== skids ===
A team that is on the skids is having a losing streak, perhaps a severe one that threatens to ruin their chances at the playoffs or to drop them into the cellar. Headline: "Yankees Remain on the Skids". Also used in the singular, skid, for a losing streak or hitless streak: "Peralta's single in the fourth ended an 0-for-26 skid."

=== skip ===
A manager. Taken from the boating term skipper, the captain or commanding officer of a ship.

=== sky ===
Used as a verb: to hit a fly ball. "Sizemore skies one. . . . Caught by the right fielder."

=== skyscraper ===
A very high fly ball. Sometimes referred to as a "rainmaker" because it is so high it may touch the clouds.

=== slap hitter ===
A hitter who sacrifices power for batting average, trying to make contact with the ball and "hit it where they ain't". Prime examples: Willie Keeler, Ty Cobb, Tony Gwynn, Pete Rose, Rod Carew, and Ichiro Suzuki.

=== slash line ===
A representation of multiple baseball statistics separated by the slash, for example .330/.420/.505. Sometimes referred to as a "triple slash", to differentiate it from a quad slash, below. The typical data represented are batting average (AVG) / on-base percentage (OBP) / slugging percentage (SLG). "Slash" is also used as a verb, meaning to effect a given slash line, such as "he slashed .308/.438/.496". Less commonly, a slash line may contain four statistics ("quad slash line"); the first three being as noted and the fourth being on-base plus slugging (OPS).

=== slice foul ===
When a fly ball or line drive starts out over fair territory, then curves into foul territory due to aerodynamic force caused by spinning of the ball, imparted by the bat. A slice curves away from the batter (i.e.: it curves to the right for a right-handed batter and to the left for a left-handed batter).

=== slide ===
- When a runner drops to the ground when running toward a base to avoid a tag. Players also sometimes slide head-first into first base. If former St. Louis Cardinals pitcher and Hall of Famer Dizzy Dean had seen something like that, he'd probably have said the player never should have "slud into first".
- A team having a losing streak is in a slide or on the skids.

=== slider ===
A relatively fast pitch with a slight curve in the opposite direction of the throwing arm.

=== slug ===
- Shorthand for slugging percentage.
- A slugfest is an exceptionally high scoring game, perhaps with double digits for both teams; the opposite of a slugfest is a pitchers' duel.

=== slump ===
An extended period when player or team is not performing well or up to expectations; a dry spell or drought.

=== slurve ===
A cross between a slider and a curveball.

=== small ball ===
A strategy by which teams attempt to score runs using station-to-station, bunting and sacrifice plays; usually used in a situation where one run will either tie or win the game; manufacturing runs; close kin to inside baseball. "It's important for us to think small ball and hit behind runners, and also score with base hits, doubles, sacrifices—there are many ways to score", Alex Rodriguez said. "Later on, when it counts the most, it's hard only to score by home runs".

=== smoke ===
- To smoke a batter is to throw a smoker (an inside fastball) for a called strike.
- A pitcher who throws smoke throws the ball so hard the batter sees only its (imaginary) vapor trail.

=== snap throw ===
A throw made by the catcher to either first or third base after a pitch in an attempt to pick off the runner.

=== snicker ===
A type of foul ball in which the batter grazes ("snicks") the ball with the bat. The ball continues toward the catcher, with a slightly modified trajectory, making it a difficult catch.

=== snow cone ===
A catch made with the ball barely caught in the tip of a glove's webbing. Sometimes referred to as an "ice cream cone".

=== snowman ===
An 8-run inning as it appears on the scoreboard, like two large balls of snow stacked on top of one another.

May also be used as a nickname for a teammate wearing the number 8.

=== soft hands ===
A fielder's ability to cradle the ball well in his glove. Contrast hard hands. "I was teaching the players to field the ball out front and 'give in' with the ball and bring it up to a throwing position. The analogy I used was to pretend the ball is an egg and give in with it. I consider this to be 'soft' hands."

=== soft toss ===
When a coach or teammate from a position adjacent the hitter throws a ball under-hand to allow the hitter to practice hitting into a net or fence.

=== soft tosser ===
A pitcher who doesn't have a really fast fastball. "Jones, a soft tosser when compared to the Tigers' other hard throwers, struck out Posada, retired Cano on a soft fly, and got Damon to fly out."

=== solo home run ===
A home run hit when there are no runners on base, so the batter circles the bases solo.

=== sophomore jinx ===
The tendency for players to follow a good rookie season with a less-spectacular one. (This term is used outside the realm of baseball as well.) Two of the most notorious examples are Joe Charboneau and Mark Fidrych. The statistical term for the sophomore jinx is "regression to the mean".

=== southpaw ===
Left-hander, especially a pitcher. Most baseball stadiums are built so that home plate is in the west and the outfield is in the east, so that when the sun sets it is not in the batter's eye. Because of this, a left-handed pitcher's arm is always facing south when he faces the plate. Thus he has a "southpaw".

=== spank ===
- To hit the ball, typically a line drive to the opposite field.
- To win a game handily or decisively. Headline: "Tigers Spank KC 13-1. Did the Royals Wave the White Flag?"

=== sparkplug ===
A fireplug. A player known for his aggressive, never-say-die attitude (though perhaps modest ability) who may help to spark his team into a rally or a win. "Versalles was the sparkplug that led the 1965 Twins to their first World Series."

=== Spider Tack ===
A sticky paste product designed for strongman competitions that has been illegally used by some pitchers to enhance their grip on the ball. Illegal grip enhancers have been used by spitball pitchers before, but Spider Tack specifically made headlines during the 2021 sticky stuff controversy.

=== speed merchant ===
A fast player, often collecting stolen bases, bunt singles and/or infield hits.

=== spike ===
A runner can "spike" an infielder by sliding into him and causing an injury with the spikes of his shoes.

=== spitter ===
A spitball pitch in which the ball has been altered by the application of spit, petroleum jelly, or some other foreign substance.

=== split-finger ===
A fastball that breaks sharply toward the ground just before reaching the plate due to the pitcher's grip; his first two fingers are spread apart to put a downward spin on the ball. Also called a forkball, splitter or Mr. Splitee.

=== splits ===
A player's splits are his performance statistics broken down or split into categories such as batting average against right-handed vs. left-handed pitchers, in home games vs. away games, or in day games vs. night games. When statistics are split in such a way they may reveal patterns that allow a manager to use (perhaps to platoon) a player strategically where he can be most effective. Sabermetricians may use such splits to investigate patterns that explain overall performance, including topics such as whether a pitcher may have doctored the ball during home games.

=== spoil a pitch ===
When a pitcher throws a strike over the plate that at first seems good enough to strike the batter out but the batter fouls it off, the batter may be said to "spoil the pitch". The usage is similar to that of "fighting off a pitch".

=== spot starter ===
- A pitcher who starts an occasional game (perhaps only one game) who is not a regular starter in the rotation. This is a pitcher who is already on a team's roster and usually works as a relief pitcher. In contrast to a spot starter, who is already on the roster, an emergency starter is typically a player who is brought up from the minor leagues on very short notice because a regular starter is injured. Sometimes, however, even a player who is already on the roster may be referred to as an emergency starter if his starting role arises because the regularly scheduled starter has been injured.
- In recent years, the term "spot starter" has more commonly been used to describe a pitcher called up from the minors specifically to make one start before being optioned back down to the minors immediately following the game, particularly when the pitcher in question is the extra player added to the active roster for a scheduled doubleheader.

=== spray hitter ===
A batter who hits line drives to all fields. Not a pull hitter.

=== spring training ===
In Major League Baseball, spring training consists of work-outs and exhibition games that precede the regular season. It serves the purpose of both auditioning players for final roster spots and giving players practice prior to competitive play. The managers and coaches use spring training to set their opening-day 25-man roster.

=== square around ===
When a batter turns his stance from being sideways to the pitcher's mound to facing the pitcher's mound. This is typically done when a batter prepares to bunt a ball, in particular when he intends to do a sacrifice bunt. "Whether you square around or pivot, you want to make sure you are in a comfortable and athletic position to bunt the ball. Your knees should be bent and your bat should be held out in front of your body. The barrel of the bat should be at the same height as your eyes and at the top of the strike zone".

=== square up ===
To get a good swing at the ball and hit it hard near the center of the ball. "It makes a big difference because you work hard to square a ball up, but they catch it or make a good play", Pierre said. "It takes the wind out of you a little bit and it makes him (Verlander) probably feel better, too".

=== squeeze play ===
A tactic used to attempt to score a runner from third on a bunt. There are two types of squeeze plays: suicide squeeze and safety squeeze. In a suicide squeeze, the runner takes off towards home plate as soon as the pitcher begins his throw toward home plate. In a safety squeeze, the runner waits until the batter makes contact with the ball before committing himself to try to reach home.

=== squeeze the zone ===
When an umpire calls balls and strikes as if the strike zone is smaller than usual, he's said to "squeeze the zone".

=== squibber ===
A nubber. A batted ball that is either off the end of the bat or from a very late swing, which puts side spin on it as it rolls (typically toward the first or third baseman).

=== staff ===
The pitching staff of a given team.

=== stand-up double or triple (or standing/standing up) ===
An extra-base hit in which the runner reaches base easily without needing to slide, i.e. remains standing up as he touches the bag. Also referred to simply as "standing" if a runner crosses home plate in this manner; e.g. "the runner from third base scores standing (up)."

=== stance ===
- When a hitter steps into the batter's box, he typically stands a few inches from home plate with one shoulder facing the pitcher's mound. His particular manner of bending his knees or holding his bat is referred to as the batter's stance or hitting stance.
- A catcher typically crouches or squats behind home plate, holding his glove up as a target for the pitcher. This is referred to as a catcher's stance.
- A pitcher's stance or pitching position involves how and where he stands on the mound, how his back foot toes the rubber, his windup, and his delivery.

=== stanza ===
An inning. "In that stanza, however, the Tigers . . . clawed their way back into the ballgame."

=== starting pitcher ===
The "starter" is the first pitcher in the game for each team. (For a less frequently used strategy to start the game, see opener.)

=== starting rotation ===
Another term for rotation (the planned order of a team's starting pitchers).

=== station ===
A player's assigned defensive position.

=== station-to-station ===
Oddly enough, this term can mean completely different things. It can be referred to as a close relative of inside baseball, where hit-and-runs and base-stealing are frequent. It can also mean its exact opposite, where a team takes fewer chances of getting thrown out on the bases by cutting down on steal attempts and taking the extra base on a hit; therefore, the team will maximize the number of runs scored on a homer.

=== stathead ===
Statheads use statistical methods to analyze baseball game strategy as well as player and team performance. They use the tools of sabermetrics to analyze baseball.

=== stats ===
Short for "statistics", the numbers generated by the game: runs, hits, errors, strikeouts, batting average, earned run average, fielding average, etc. Most of the numbers used by players and fans are not true mathematical statistics, but the term is in common usage.

=== stayed alive ===
When a batter who already has two strikes swings at but fouls off a pitch, he may be said to have "stayed alive". He (or his at bat) will live to see another pitch. Similarly, when a team that is facing elimination from the playoffs wins a game, it may be said to have "stayed alive" to play another game.

=== steady diet ===
When a batter shows that it is easier to get him out with a certain type of pitch, he may receive a "steady diet" of that type of pitch thrown. Headline: "Phillies' Howard Gets a Steady Diet of Curveballs".

=== steaks ===
§ ribbie

RBIs. Derived from the common pronunciation of RBI as "ribbie", which was apparently once pronounced as rib-eye.

=== steal ===
See stolen base.

=== stealing signs ===
- When a team that is at bat tries to see the sign the catcher is giving to the pitcher (indicating what type of pitch to throw), the team is said to be stealing signs. This may be done by a runner who is on base (typically second base) watching the catcher's signs to the pitcher and giving a signal of some kind to the batter. (To prevent this, the pitcher and catcher may change their signs when there is a runner on second base.) Sometimes a first-base or third-base coach might see a catcher's signs if the catcher isn't careful. In unusual cases, the signs may be read through binoculars by somebody sitting in the stands, perhaps in center field, and sending a signal to the hitter in some way.
- When a hitter is suspected of peeking to see how a catcher is setting up behind the plate as a clue to what pitch might be coming or what the intended location is, then the pitcher will usually send the hitter a message: stick it in his ear.

=== stepping in the bucket ===
A phrase for an "open" batting stance, in which the hitter's leading foot is aligned away from the plate (toward left field for a right-handed batter). The stance reduces power in the swing and slows the hitter's exit toward first base; however, many players believe it allows them to see the pitch better, and more naturally drive the ball to the opposite field.

=== stick it in his ear ===
"Stick it in his ear!" is a cry that may come from fans in the stands, appealing to the home team pitcher to be aggressive (throw the ball at the opposing batter). The line is attributed originally, however, to Leo Durocher.

=== stick it in his pocket ===
Said of an infielder who secures a batted or thrown ball, but chooses to hold the ball rather than throwing to try for an out. For example, a shortstop might range in the hole to field a ground ball, but then elect to "stick it in his pocket" rather than attempting to throw to first base to put out the batter-runner, whether to avoid the possibility of a throwing error, to prevent another runner on base from advancing on the throw or, most often, because the ball was hit slowly enough that, by the time it's fielded, the runner(s) have already advanced so far that a throw and catch for a force-out is unlikely.

=== sticky stuff ===
Layman's term for illegal grip-enhancing substances used by pitchers such as pine tar, petroleum jelly, human saliva, and some resin-based products.

=== sticks ===
- Slang term for encouraging a team to have a productive offensive half of the inning. Ex. "Let's get on the sticks."
- A term used when encouraging a player wearing uniform number 11. Ex. "You got this, sticks."

=== stolen base ===
In baseball, a stolen base (or "steal") occurs when a baserunner successfully advances to the next base while the pitcher is delivering the ball to home plate. In baseball statistics, stolen bases are denoted by SB. If the catcher thwarts the stolen base by throwing the runner out, the event is recorded as caught stealing (CS). Also see uncontested steal.

=== stole first ===
A batter who reaches first base following an uncaught third strike has (unofficially) "stolen" it.

=== stone fingers ===
A fielder who misplays easy ground balls. Also see hard hands and tin glove.

=== stopper ===
- A team's best starting pitcher, called upon to stop a losing streak
- A team's closer (pre-2000)
- An unusually effective relief pitcher

=== stranded ===
Another term for left on base.

=== streak ===
- A series of consecutive wins (a winning streak) or losses (a losing streak). Also, a string, especially if referring to a series of wins.
- A series of games in which a batter gets a hit (hitting streak) or fails to get a hit (hitless streak), or accomplishes some other feat of interest (e.g., gets a stolen base or hits a home run).

=== stretch ===
- A stretch in baseball pitching means starting sideways, raising your arms high, then throwing the ball. Pitchers often do this with runners on base to keep an eye on them.
- For other uses of the word "stretch", see stretch a hit, stretch run, down the stretch, and seventh inning stretch.

=== stretch a hit ===
To stretch a hit is to take an additional base on a hit, typically by aggressive running.

=== stretch the lineup ===
- To stretch the lineup is to have strong hitters after the 3rd, 4th, and 5th places in the batting order, which are normally where the power hitters are found. "Victor goes out there every day and shows you why he is a professional hitter – he's never afraid to just take a base hit when that's what there for him", Leyland said. "Carlos lets us stretch our lineup with another professional hitter, and also a switch-hitter".

=== stretch run ===
The last part of the regular baseball season when teams are competing to reach the playoffs or championship. Perhaps derived from the term "home stretch" in horse racing or car racing when the horse (or car) comes out of the final turn and is racing toward the finish line. Headline: "Stretch runs in big leagues may be most interesting."

=== strike ===
The term strike is used in several ways, both to describe the act of swinging at a pitch, the ruling of a legal pitch, and in the current count on the batter.

A strike as part of the playing action is defined as:
- A pitch which the batter strikes at a pitch and misses.
- A pitch which the batter does not strike at, and any part of the ball passes through any part of the strike zone.
- Is a foul ball by the batter with fewer than two strikes.
- Is bunted foul with any number of strikes.
- Touches the batter as he strikes at it.
- Touches the batter in flight in the strike zone.
- Is a foul tip.

When used to describe the current count, it will be the second number listed. E.g, 1-2 means the count is one ball and two strikes; 2-0 means the count is two balls and no strikes.

- Pitches which tend to cross the strike zone may be collectively referred to as "strikes", regardless of any actual calls by the umpire; a pitcher who is consistently throwing balls that cross the strike zone is said to be "throwing strikes". This usage generally does not apply to individual pitches, which are referred to as strikes only if called as such by the umpire.
- By analogy, a particularly hard, accurate throw by a fielder to put out a baserunner is sometimes referred to as throwing a strike. Ex., "Rick Ankiel just threw a strike to third base from 250 feet away."

=== strike out ===
- Of a pitcher, the throwing of three strikes in one plate appearance. This normally retires the batter, and counts as one out. However, it is possible for the hitter to strike out and still reach base, if the catcher drops the strikeout pitch.
- Of a hitter, with a count of two strikes, to make a third strike by swinging at and missing a pitch, swinging at a pitch and tipping a foul ball directly into the catcher's mitt which is subsequently caught, taking a called strike, or bunting a ball foul.

=== strikeout looking ===
"strikeout looking" or "struck out looking" means the batter did not swing at a pitch the umpire judged a strike, resulting in an out. Some scorecards show it with a backwards "K". Sports commentators have also been known to use the slang term "just browsing" when showing a batter that's "struck out looking" on SportsCenter or other related shows.

=== strikeout pitch ===
- The last pitch of a strikeout; the third strike.
- The type of pitch (specific to each pitcher) that he or she prefers to use as the last pitch of a strikeout. This is almost always a breaking pitch – a pitch that moves out of the strike zone, increasing the chance that the batter will swing and miss.

=== strikeout pitcher ===
A pitcher who strikes out hitters a lot.

=== strike 'em out/throw 'em out ===
A double play in which a batter strikes out and the catcher then immediately throws out a baserunner trying to steal. Sometimes this is called strikeout/double-play. Usually scored 2-6 or 2-4 for an out at second.

=== strike out the side ===
- A pitcher is said to have "struck out the side" when he retires all three batters in one inning by striking them out.
- "All three" may mean that only three batters came to the plate (and struck out), but the phrase also refers to the act of recording all three outs of an inning via the strikeout while other batters reached base.

=== strike zone ===
An area above home plate with these constraints:
- The upper limit: A line drawn halfway between the top of the batter's shoulders to the top of the batter's uniform pants.
- The lower limit: A line drawn at the hollow beneath the kneecap.
In Official Baseball Rules, NCAA, and other derivatives, the strike zone is established when the batter is prepared to strike at the ball. In NFHS rules, the strike zone is established when the batter takes a "normal batting stance."

=== string ===
- A series of consecutive wins. A winning streak.
- Any other series of consecutive events, such as strike-outs or scoreless innings.

=== struck out swinging ===
A batter called out on strikes when swinging at the third strike is said to have "struck out swinging". Usually labeled with the traditional forward "K" on scorecards.

=== struck out bunting ===
A batter called out on strikes when the third strike resulted from a bunted ball that came to rest in foul territory.

=== stuff ===
A pitcher's "stuff" is how hard their pitches are to hit, combining movement (breaking balls) or speed (fastballs). This is separate from location, another key aspect of pitching.

=== submarine ===
A pitcher who throws with such a severe sidearm motion that the pitch comes from below his waist, sometimes near the ground. (A submariner does not throw underhanded, as in fastpitch softball.) See submarine.

=== subway series ===
When two teams from the same city or metropolitan area play a series of games, they are presumed to be so near to one another that they could take the subway to play at their opponent's stadium. Mets vs. Yankees would be (and is) called a subway series; a Cubs vs. White Sox series would be an "L" series; and a series between the Oakland A's and the San Francisco Giants would be (and was) the "BART" series. However, a series between the Los Angeles Dodgers and the Los Angeles Angels would not be a subway series, because there is no subway or other rail service between Dodger Stadium and Angel Stadium of Anaheim (not even the fabled but fanciful line between "Anaheim, Azusa and Cuc ... amonga"). Instead such a series is referred to as a freeway series.

=== Sunday Funday ===
After winning a weekend series in college baseball, the team will party Sunday night. This is because college teams play five nights a week and have no free time to party except on Sundays, because they can rest on their required Monday off day.

=== suicide squeeze ===
A squeeze play in which the runner on third breaks for home on the pitch, so that, if the batter does not lay down a bunt, then the runner is an easy out (unless he steals home). Contrast this with the safety squeeze.

=== summer classic ===
The Major League Baseball All-Star Game, also known as the Midsummer Classic. These annual games, typically played in July, pit the all-stars of the National League against the all-stars of the American League, a concept designed to acknowledge and showcase the achievements of the best players in each league.

=== sweep ===
To win all the games in a series between two teams, whether during the regular 162-game season or during the league championships or World Series. During the regular season, pairs of teams typically square off in several 3- or 4-game series at the home parks of each team. It is also thus possible for one team to sweep a 3- or 4-game series, the "home series" (all the games a team plays at its home field against another given team), the "road series", or the "season series" between two teams. ("Sweep" was also used to mean winning both games of a doubleheader. Sweeps are also used for a college baseball team who wins all three games of a weekend series.)

=== sweeper ===
A pitch very similar to a slider, but with more horizontal movement.

=== sweet spot ===
The meat of the bat. "Batters know from experience that there is a sweet spot on the bat, about 17 centimetres (6.7 in) from the end of the barrel, where the shock of the impact, felt by the hands, is reduced to such an extent that the batter is almost unaware of the collision. At other impact points, the impact is usually felt as a sting or jarring of the hands and forearm, particularly if the impact occurs at a point well removed from the sweet spot". " 'I was ready for a fastball early in the count, because I knew he would go to his other stuff later", Santiago said. "I got one, and I just wanted to hit it on the sweet spot' ".

=== swing ===
- When a batter is following his coach's advice to not bunt (never mind those runners), he is said to "swing away".
- "Swing for the downs" means swing mightily – all or nothing.
- Attempting a home run is to "swing for the fences".
- "Swing from the heels" means swinging very hard, hoping for an extra base hit.
- A "swingman" is a pitcher with relatively good stamina who can function as either a long reliever or a starter, e.g. Justin Masterson during his time with the Red Sox.

=== switch hitter ===
A switch hitter can hit from either side of the plate, i.e. bats both left-handed and right-handed.

=== sword ===
A half-hearted partial swing at a pitch that catches the batter by surprise, which he is unable to successfully check. Typically this will be a breaking ball with a lot of horizontal movement out of the strike zone when the batter is looking for a fastball.

== T ==
=== tablesetter ===
- a player placed high in the batting order for his tendency to hit for average and steal bases is said to "set the table" for the power hitters behind him in the lineup.
- an unexpected event early in a ball game, such as a defensive error or a hit batsmen, can be called a "tablesetter" for the outcome of the game.

=== tag ===
- A tag out. A runner is out if, while in jeopardy, a fielder touches him with a live ball or the hand or glove holding a live ball.
- To hit the ball hard, typically for an extra-base hit.

=== tag up ===
When a batter hits a ball that is caught before touching the ground (he is out) every runner must retreat back to the base he just left. Once he has touched that base (tagged up), he may legally advance again. If he fails to tag up he can be called out on appeal.

=== tailgate ===
A catcher's butt. In the phrase "he didn't keep his tailgate down" an announcer means a pitched ball was very low or even hit the dirt and went between the catcher's legs.

=== take a pitch ===
When a batter decides not to swing at a pitch, he "takes the pitch." He may do this following the instruction of a coach who has given him a take sign.

=== take sign ===
The signal from a coach for the batter to not swing at the next pitch—to "take" it. Sometimes when a new pitcher or a reliever comes in, batters are given a general instruction to take the first pitch. Most often, they are told to take a pitch when the count is 3–0.

=== take something off the pitch ===
To throw an off-speed pitch or to throw a given pitch slower than the pitcher usually throws it.

=== take the bat out of his hands ===
To issue an intentional walk. By doing so, a pitcher reduces the potential damage from allowing the batter to swing at and hit a pitch. "Buck Showalter took the bat out of Barry Bonds' hands with an unheard-of strategy – a bases-loaded intentional walk. Amazingly, the Arizona Diamondbacks manager got away with it."

=== take the crown ===
To win the championship, i.e. remove the current champions from the throne.

=== take the field ===
When the defensive players arrive at their positions at the beginning of a half-inning, they have "taken the field". (The pitcher "takes the hill".)

=== take-out slide ===
A slide performed for the purpose of hampering the play of the defense. A runner from first to second base will often try to "take out" the fielder at the base to disrupt his throw to first base and "break up the double play". Although the runner is supposed to stay within the base-paths, as long as he touches second base he has a lot of leeway to use his body. Runners in this situation usually need to slide in order to avoid being hit by the throw from second to first; but whether they do a "take-out slide" or come into the base with their spikes high in the air depends as much on their personal disposition as it does the situation. The title of a biography of Ty Cobb—"The Tiger Wore Spikes"—says something about how he ran the basepaths.

Before the 2015 season, "runners were given a good deal of leeway when sliding into a base in an attempt to break up a double play." After some infielders were injured on rough plays during that season, notably when Chase Utley slid into Ruben Tejada during the National League Divisional playoffs and broke his leg, Major League Baseball instituted the "bona-fide slide" rule. The runner must make contact with the ground before reaching the base, he must be able to reach the base with a hand or foot, he must be able to remain on the base at the completion of the slide (except at home plate) and he must not change his path for the purpose of initiating contact with a fielder.

=== tap ===
To hit a slow or easy ground ball, typically to the pitcher: "Martinez tapped it back to the mound." A ball hit in this way is a tapper.

=== tape measure home run ===
An especially long home run. The term originated from a 1953 game in which Mickey Mantle hit a ball out of Griffith Stadium in Washington, D.C. The distance the ball flew was measured and the next day a picture of Mantle with a tape measure was published in the newspaper. A play-by-play announcer may also call a long home run a tape measure job. Although fans have always been interested in how far home runs may travel and in comparing the great home runs of the great and not-so-great home run hitters, the science of measuring home runs remains inexact.

=== tater ===
A home run. The term started to appear in the 1970s, specifically as "long tater". (The ball itself has been known as a "potato" or "tater" for generations.)

=== tattoo ===
To hit the ball very hard, figuratively to put a tattoo from the bat's trademark on the ball.

=== tax evader ===
A deep fly ball which has a chance to become a base hit or home run. Said of Brett Lawrie's inside-the-park home run on 25 June 2016 when the ball was still in the air with its fate not yet certain.

=== TB ===
Total bases.

=== tea party ===
Conference on the mound, involving more players than just the pitcher and catcher, and sometimes coaches and managers. Also a pow wow.

=== tee off ===
Easily hittable pitches are likened to stationary baseballs sitting on batting tees (or possibly golf tees, since this term is also part of the lexicon of golf), and therefore batters hitting such pitches are said to be 'teeing off'.

=== telegraph ===
To tip one's pitches.

=== terminator ===
A pitcher's "out pitch" (usually his best pitch); the one upon which he relies. Made famous by the movie Major League II.

=== Texas Leaguer ===
- A Texas Leaguer (or Texas League single) is a weakly hit fly ball that drops in for a single between an infielder and an outfielder. This is now more commonly referred to as a flare, blooper, or "bloop single". It is most colorfully called a 'gork shot' or a 'duck snort.' See blooper.
- Outfielder Ollie Pickering is credited with giving baseball the term "Texas Leaguer," a pejorative slang for a weak pop fly that lands unimpressively between an infielder and an outfielder for a base hit. According to the April 21, 1906, edition of The Sporting Life, John McCloskey, founder of the Texas League and then-manager of the Houston Mudcats – who would later go onto manage the St. Louis Cardinals – signed 22-year-old Pickering to play center field on the morning of May 21, 1892. That afternoon, Pickering turned in one of the most remarkable performances in the history of the Texas League, stringing together seven consecutive singles in one game, each a soft, looping fly ball that fell in no-man's land between either the first baseman and right fielder or the third baseman and left fielder. News of Pickering's feat spread quickly throughout the nation and the term "Texas Leaguer" became ingrained in the baseball lexicon. Pickering's seven consecutive singles in a game still stands as a Texas League record. Pickering would go on to play and manage for 30 years, with major league stops as an outfielder for the Louisville Colonels, Philadelphia A's, Cleveland Blues (now Guardians), St. Louis Browns and Washington Senators.

=== third of an inning ===
A concept in statistics to account for when a pitcher retires only one or two of the [at least] three batters in a full inning, e.g. 3.1 and 5.2 (for convenience in print; those represent 3 1/3 and 5 2/3 respectively).

=== three-bagger or three-base hit ===
A triple.

=== three true outcomes ===
The three ways a plate appearance can end without fielders coming into play: walks, home runs, and strikeouts. Baseball Prospectus coined the term in homage to Rob Deer, who excelled at producing all three outcomes. A player whose at bats frequently end in one of the three true outcomes is known as a three outcome hitter. The statistical result of the three true outcomes on a player's slash line is a low batting average, as well as an unusually high on-base percentage relative to the batting average. Prior to the advent of sabermetrics, players with a high percentage of their plate appearances ending in one of the three true outcomes were underrated, as general managers often overestimate the harm in striking out relative to other ways of getting out, and underestimate the value of a walk.

=== three up, three down ===
To face just three batters in an inning. Having a "three up, three down inning" is the goal of any pitcher. Unlike in a 1-2-3 inning, batters are permitted to reach base so long as only three batters are faced by the pitcher. For instance, a single, then a strikeout, then a double play is a three up three down inning, but not a 1-2-3 inning. See also: side retired, 1-2-3 inning.

=== through the wickets ===
When a batted ball passes through the legs of a player on the field (most commonly an infielder) it's often said, "That one went right through the wickets." The term refers to the metal arches (called wickets) used in the game of croquet through which balls are hit. Letting the ball through his legs makes a baseball player look (and feel) inept, and the official scorekeeper typically records the play as an error.

=== throw a clothesline ===
When a fielder throws the ball so hard it appears to hardly arc at all, he has "thrown a clothesline". Akin to a line drive being described as a rope or frozen rope.

=== throw him the chair ===
Striking out a batter, causing him to sit down in the dugout.

=== thrower ===
A pitcher who throws the ball hard in the direction of home plate but without much accuracy or command. Distinguished from a "pitcher", who may or may not throw the ball as hard but who has command and is likely to be more successful in getting batters out.

=== throwing seeds/throwing the pill/throwing BBs ===
When a pitcher's fastball is so good it seems as though the baseball is the size of a seed (or pill or BB), and just about as hittable.

=== tie him up ===
Getting a pitch in on the hitter's hands, making it impossible for him to swing.

=== tilt ===
- A game. A face-off between competitors, as in a joust. Headline: "Myers, Phillies beat Mets in key NL East tilt".
- The amount of movement on a breaking pitch. "He's showing a lot of tilt on his slider today."

=== time play ===
A run can be scored on the same play as the third out, but only if the third out is not a force out, and is not made by the batter before reaching first base. In order for the run to count, the runner must reach home plate before the third out is made elsewhere on the field, so the play is known as a "time play".

=== tin glove ===
A poor fielding (defensive) player is often said to have a "tin glove", as if his baseball mitt was made of inflexible metal. This is a sarcastic reference to the gold glove awarded for defensive excellence.

=== tipping ===
- When a pitcher inadvertently signals what type pitch is next, he is said to be "tipping" or "telegraphing" them. It may be something in his position on the rubber, his body lean, how he holds or moves his glove when going into the stretch, whether he moves his index finger outside his glove, or some aspect of his pitching motion. Akin to what is called a tell in poker: a habit, behavior, or physical reaction that gives other players more information about your hand.
- Coaches as well as players on the bench make a habit of watching everything an opposing pitcher is doing, looking for information that will allow them to forecast what kind of pitch is coming. When pitchers go through a bad spell, they may become paranoid that they're tipping their pitches to the opposing batters. A pitcher and coaches are likely to spend a lot of time studying film of the games to learn what the pitcher might be doing that tips his pitches.
- Pitchers will try to hide their grip even while delivering the ball. Rick Sutcliffe used to wind up in such a way that his body concealed the ball from the batter almost until the moment of release. In contrast, relief ace Dennis Eckersley, playing a psychological game, would hold the ball up in such a way that he purposely showed off the type of grip he had on it, essentially "daring" the batter to hit it.

=== toe the slab ===
To take the mound; to pitch. Sometimes expressed as "toe the rubber". Literally, to put the toe of his shoe on the rubber.

=== took the ball out of the catcher's glove ===
When a batter swings a bit late, perhaps hitting the ball to the opposite field, a broadcaster may say he "took the ball out of the catcher's glove" (just before the catcher was able to catch it).

=== took the collar ===
Went hitless. See collar.

=== tomahawk ===
To hit a high pitch, perhaps one that's out of the strike zone, so that the batter may appear to be swinging downwards as if his bat is a tomahawk. "Things started well for the Blue Jays in their first at-bat when Stairs tomahawked a Matsuzaka pitch on one bounce into the stands behind Fenway Park's famed Pesky's Pole for a ground-rule double."
Kirby Puckett when asked by broadcaster Jim Kaat about his walk-off home run which won Game Six of the 1991 World Series, "I just tomahawked that ball, Kitty!"

=== Tommy John surgery ===
A type of reconstructive elbow surgery with estimated recovery time 14-18 months. Pitcher Tommy John was the first professional athlete to successfully undergo it.

=== tools ===
See 5-tool player.

=== tools of ignorance ===
A catcher's gear.

Different sources have credited Muddy Ruel and Bill Dickey with coining the phrase.

=== toolsy ===
A player with many tools who hasn't matured yet.

=== TOOTBLAN ===
A tongue-in-cheek term for when a baserunner commits a blunder that leads to him being tagged or forced out. It stands for "Thrown Out On The Basepaths Like A Nincompoop". It was created as part of an effort to determine what impact on-base outs had on a batter's on-base percentage.

=== top of the inning ===
The first half of an inning during which the visiting team bats; derived from its position in the line score.

=== top of the order batter ===
A batter who has speed and a propensity to get on base, and who thus may be suited to be the lead-off or second hitter in the line-up. "I think Brett Jackson looks a lot more like a top of the order guy right now than a middle of the order guy, and he seems like a viable leadoff hitter based on his performance as a professional."

=== top-step pitcher ===
When a pitcher has reached a point where he's at risk of being pulled and replaced by another pitcher, the manager may be standing at the "top step" of the dugout, ready to go immediately to the mound after the next pitch.

=== tore the cover off the ball ===
Hit the ball so hard that the batter figuratively tore the cover off the ball. Also used in Ernest Thayer's famous "Casey at the Bat":

"But Flynn let drive a single, to the wonderment of all,

And Blake, the much despised, tore the cover off the ball ..."

=== tossed ===
When a player or manager is ordered by an umpire to leave a game, that player or manager is said to have been "tossed". Usually, this is the result of arguing with an umpire. Similar to being "red carded" or "sent off" in soccer. See ejected.

=== total bases ===
The sum of the number of bases advanced by a batter/runner on his own safe hits over a specified period of time, where a single = 1, a double = 2, a triple = 3, and a home run = 4. The quotient of total bases divided by at-bats is slugging average, a measure of hitting power.

=== touch all the bases ===
To "touch all the bases" or "touch 'em all" is to hit a home run. (If a player fails to literally "touch 'em all" – if he misses a base during his home run trot – he can be called out on appeal).

=== touched up ===
A pitcher who gives up several hits may be said to have been "touched up".

=== touchdown ===
A seven-run difference, derived from six points for a touchdown plus the extra point in American football. For example, a team ahead 10–3 is said to be "up by a touchdown".

=== TR ===
Throws right; used in describing a player's statistics, e.g. John Doe (TR, BR, 6', 172 lbs.)

=== track down ===
To field a ball, typically a ground ball that a fielder has to travel some distance to stop or a fly ball that an outfielder has to run far to catch. "Mike Cameron, Milwaukee Brewers, can track down flies with the best centerfielders in baseball today."

=== trap ===
When a fielder attempts to catch a batted baseball in the air but the ball hits the ground just before it enters the fielder's glove, the fielder is said to have "trapped the ball". Sometimes it is difficult for the umpire to tell whether the ball was caught for an out or instead trapped. "Any outfielder worth his salt always makes the catch of the sinking line drive by rolling over and raising his glove triumphantly. It does not matter if he trapped the ball. It does not matter that the replay shows he trapped the ball. What is important is the success of the deception at that moment so that the umpire calls the batter out."

=== triple ===
A three-base hit.

=== triple crown ===
- A batter who (at season's end) leads the league in three major categories: home runs, runs batted in, and batting average.
- A pitcher who (at season's end) leads the league in three major categories: earned run average, wins, and strikeouts.

=== triple play ===
When three outs are made on one play. This is rare. While a typical game may have several double plays, a typical season has only a few triple plays. This is primarily because the circumstances are rather specific—that there be at least two runners, and no outs, and that typically one of these circumstances occurs: (1) the batter hits a sharp grounder to the third baseman, who touches the base, throws to second base to get the second out, and the second baseman or shortstop relays the ball to first quickly enough to get the batter-runner for the third out (also called a 5-4-3 or 5-6-3 triple play, respectively); OR (2) the runners are off on the pitch, in a hit-and-run play, but an infielder catches the ball on a line-drive out, and relays to the appropriate bases in time to get two other runners before they can retreat to their bases. The latter situation can also yield an extremely rare unassisted triple play, of which 14 have occurred in the entire history of major league baseball. A second baseman or shortstop will catch the ball, his momentum will carry him to second base to make the second out, and he will run and touch the runner from first before the runner can fully regain his momentum and turn around back to first.

=== turn two ===
To execute a double play.

=== twin bill ===
- A doubleheader.

=== twin killing ===
- A double play.
- Winning both ends of a doubleheader.

=== twirler ===
An old fashioned term for a pitcher. In the early years, pitchers would often twirl their arms in a circle one or more times before delivering the ball, literally using a "windup", in the belief it would reduce stress on their arms. The terms "twirler" and "twirling" faded along with that motion. The modern term "hurler" is effectively the substitute term.

=== two away or two down ===
When there are two outs in the inning.

=== two-bagger or two-base hit ===
A double.

=== two-seam fastball ===
A fastball held in such a way that it breaks slightly downward, and most often away from the pitcher's arm, as it crosses the plate. A sinker. A two-seamer. Due to the grip, generally with or along the two straight seams, as opposed to a four seamer, which is gripped across the horseshoe, the batter sees only one pair of seams spinning instead of two.

=== two-sport player ===
Many college athletes play two sports, but it is rare for someone to play two major league professional sports well or simultaneously. Sometimes players have brief major league trial periods in two professional sports but quickly drop one of them. Some "two-sport" players who played multiple major league baseball seasons have been Jim Thorpe, Brian Jordan, Gene Conley, Bo Jackson, Danny Ainge, Ron Reed, Deion Sanders and Mark Hendrickson. Although Michael Jordan tried to become a major league baseball player after his first retirement from the National Basketball Association, he didn't make the big leagues and did not try to play both baseball and basketball at the same time.

=== two-way player ===
- A term borrowed from American football to describe either a player who can pitch and hit well, or a player who can pitch and play another defensive position well. The most famous Major League ballplayer who was truly a two-way player was Babe Ruth. He started his career as an outstanding pitcher and later played in the outfield—and was one of the greatest home run hitters of all time. A modern example of a true two-way player is Shohei Ohtani, the first MLB player since Ruth to perform at a superstar level as both a hitter and pitcher.
- The term is sometimes used to describe a player who is good at both offense and defense: "Manager Jim Leyland said during the season that he believes Inge has the potential to become one of the league's best two-way players."

== U ==
=== UA or U.A. ===
Abbreviation for Union Association, a one-year (1884) major league.

=== Uecker seats ===
Spectator seating offering a very poor view of the playing field, usually located in a stadium's upper decks. Named for longtime Milwaukee Brewers announcer Bob Uecker, in reference to one of his Miller Lite TV ads from the 1980s in which he is removed from the box seats and, after musing that he "must be in the front row," learns that his tickets actually put him in the back row of the right field upper deck.

=== ugly finder ===
A foul ball hit into a dugout, presumably to "find" someone who is ugly or to render him that way if he fails to dodge the ball.

=== ukulele hitter ===
A weak hitter – banjo hitter, Punch and Judy hitter. "Wolff: Ukulele Hitter Makes Hall of Fame as Broadcaster".

=== ultimate grand slam ===
A grand slam by a member of the home team when they are exactly three runs behind in the bottom of the final inning, thus overcoming a 3-run deficit and winning the game with one swing. See also walk-off home run.

=== umpire ===
"The ump" is in charge of a game, as are members of his crew ("refs" in most other sports).

=== unassisted play ===
When a fielder single-handedly executes a play which is more often completed by multiple fielders. For example, with a runner on first base, a ground ball is hit to the shortstop who then steps on second base, completing a force out. Unassisted double plays are rare, and unassisted triple plays are extremely rare.

=== Uncle Charlie ===
A curveball.

=== uncontested steal, undefended steal ===
If a base runner successfully advances to the next base while the pitcher is delivering the ball to home plate but the catcher does not attempt to throw him out, then the steal may be scored as an uncontested or undefended steal. In the game's statistics, the runner would not be credited with a stolen base. Also called defensive indifference. See also stolen base, fielder's choice.

=== up ===
- The player at bat or on his way there.
- "Batter up!": Start the inning (says an umpire).
- Three up, three down: Three batters came to the plate and all three are out.
- A team in the lead is "up" by some number of runs.
- Called up, a player has been promoted from the minors to the majors.

=== up and in ===
Same as high and tight.

=== up in the zone ===
A pitch to the upper part of the strike zone. "When Miller throws his fastball up in the zone, opponents are hitting .079 (6-for-76) and have missed on 36 percent of swings (league average is .232). When his fastball is down or in the middle of the strike zone, opponents hit .270 with a miss rate of 15 percent."

=== up the middle ===
(adverb) Said of a ball batted through the middle of the infield, i.e. over or near second base and toward or into the outfield.

=== upper decker ===
- A home run that lands in the stadium's upper deck.
- A dip of tobacco placed in the upper lip.

=== uppercut ===
When a batter's swing moves upward as the bat moves forward. "The looping or uppercut swing is most common when the hitter 'loads up his swing' in order to hit with more power."

=== upstairs ===
A high pitch, usually above the strike zone.

=== up the elevator shaft ===
A high pop-up directly over the batter.

=== up the middle ===
The area near an imaginary line from home plate through the pitcher's mound and second base into center field. General managers typically build teams "up the middle", i.e. strength at catcher, second base, shortstop, and center field.

=== utility ===
A player (usually a bench player) who can play several different positions.

== V ==
=== visit ===
- A team (and their fans) in another team's home stadium are "visiting" as "the visitors".
- A conference with a pitcher is referred to as a "visit to the mound".

=== VORP ===
Value Over Replacement Player, Keith Woolner's method of evaluating baseball players. VORP ranks players by comparing their run production (for batters) to that of an imaginary "replacement-level" player that teams can acquire for the league-minimum salary.

=== vulture ===
A reliever who records wins in late innings by being the pitcher of record in the midst of a comeback.
A relief pitcher who blows a save, depriving the team's starting pitcher of a win, but then becomes the winning pitcher after his own team retakes the lead, especially if the game is won by the home team in the final inning (i.e. after the pitcher's last appearance on the mound in the game).

== W ==
=== waiting for the express and caught the local ===
A batter caught looking at an off-speed pitch for strike three, when the game situation called for (or the batter was expecting) a fastball.

=== wallop ===
A home run. Also used as a verb: "Albert Pujols walloped that pitch."

=== walk ===
A base on balls.

=== walk-off ===
A home team immediately wins the game when they score a run to take the lead in the bottom of the last inning.

=== warning track ===
The dirt and finely-ground gravel area along the fence, intended to help prevent fielders from running into it.

=== warning track power ===
The lack of "home run power" when a batter can only hit a fly ball that is caught at the warning track, just missing a home run.

=== waste a pitch ===
- When a pitcher gets ahead in the count he may deliberately throw the ball outside the strike zone, hoping the batter will chase it. "Waste a pitch", the opposite of attack the strike zone, is the counterpart to a batter's "taking" a 3-0 pitch.
- The phrase is sometimes applied also to hitters who deliberately foul off a strike to get good wood.

=== watering the grass ===
Hitting several soft singles over the infield to all parts of the shallow outfield in a game, e.g., "Smitty is watering the grass today."

=== wave ===
- To swing and miss a pitch, usually with a tentative swing.
- When an umpire signals to a runner to take a base on an overthrow into the dug-out or in case of a ground rule double or a balk, he waves the runner to the next base.
- When a third-base coach signals to a runner advancing toward the base to continue toward home plate he is said to wave the runner home.
- "Doing the wave" in the stands.

=== wearing a pitch ===
- When a batter allows a pitch to hit them, or knowingly drops their elbow or shoulder into the pitch to be awarded first base.
- Sometimes if a player jumps out of the way of a pitch you may hear his teammates telling him to, "wear it!" from the dugout.

=== web gem ===
An outstanding defensive play. Refers to the webbing of a glove. Popularized by Baseball Tonight on ESPN.

=== went deep ===
Hit a home run. See go deep.

=== went fishing ===
When a batter reaches across the plate trying to hit an outside pitch (and misses) he "went fishing" for it.

=== wheelhouse ===
A hitter's power zone. Usually a pitch waist-high and over the heart of the plate. "Clem threw that one right into Ruben's wheelhouse. End of story."

=== wheel play ===
Upon a bunt to the left side of the infield, the third-baseman runs toward home to field the bunt, and the shortstop runs to third base to cover. The infielders thus rotate like a wheel. "Lohse's bunt was a bad one, in the air over the head of Beltré, but it required Andrus to make an outstanding pick, stopping in his tracks as he was headed to cover third on the wheel play and then throwing to first."

=== wheels ===
Legs. A player who runs the bases fast "has wheels".

=== whiff ===
A swinging strike (referring to the bat whiffing through the air without contacting the ball).

=== whiffout ===
A swinging third strike.

=== whip ===
- A curveball.
- See Walks plus hits per inning pitched.

=== whitewash ===
A shutout.

=== wild in the strike zone ===
A pitcher who throws strikes but without sufficient control over their location is "wild in the strike zone". Headline: "Zambrano Is Too Wild in Strike Zone".

=== wild pitch ===
A wild pitch (abbreviated WP) is charged to a pitcher when, in the opinion of the official scorer, a pitch is too high, too low, or too wide of home plate for the catcher to catch the ball with ordinary effort, and which allows one or more runners to advance; or allows the batter to advance to first base, if it is a third strike with first base unoccupied. Neither a passed ball nor a wild pitch is charged as an error. It is a separate statistic.

=== win ===
See Win–loss record (pitching)

=== window shopping ===
Caught looking for strike three.
It is typically used as a friendly taunt for a batter who shows no interested in swinging at any pitch. See also "May I help you?"

=== windup ===
In baseball, there are two legal pitching positions: the windup, and the set. The choice of pitching position may be tactical, as the windup has a generally slower execution than the set and is thus at greater risk of allowing a stolen base. However, some pitchers, particularly relief pitchers, are more comfortable pitching from the set position, and thus use it regardless of the situation.

=== winning record ===
A team that has won 82 games this year is having a winning season, because now they can lose the rest and still not have a total of that many losses.

=== winning streak ===
A series of consecutive wins.

=== winter leagues ===
Leagues with their seasons held during the off-season of Major League Baseball include: Arizona Fall League, Australian Baseball League, Dominican Winter Baseball League, Mexican Pacific League, Panamanian Professional Baseball League, Puerto Rico Baseball League, Venezuelan Professional Baseball League, Nicaraguan Professional Baseball League, and Colombian Professional Baseball League. Defunct winter leagues include the Cuban League and California Winter League.

=== wire-to-wire ===
A phrase borrowed from horse racing. It refers to a team's leading a game from the first inning to the end of the game, or leading their division (or league) from the first two or three weeks of the season to the end of the season. Also sometimes used to refer to a pitcher's throwing a complete game, especially a shut-out.

=== wood ===
The bat. See get good wood.

=== woody ===
A pitch that the batter is able to get good wood on.

=== work the count ===
When a batter is patient and tries to get ahead in the count, or to get a pitch that he can hit hard, he's said to "work the count" or to "work the pitcher". Tigers Manager Jim Leyland: "We tell our hitters to be aggressive all the time, and at the same time we tell them, 'Work the pitcher.'"

=== worm burner ===
A hard hit ground ball that "burns" the ground. A daisy cutter.

=== worm killer ===
A pitch, usually an off speed or breaking ball, that hits the ground before it reaches home plate.

=== wrapped around the foul pole ===
When a batted ball that goes for a home run passes just inside the foul pole while curving toward foul territory, it is sometimes described as having "wrapped around" the pole. (The ball may actually land in foul territory, but if it passed inside the pole it is still fair. This however was not the case before 1931.)

=== WW ===
Scoresheet notation for "wasn't watching", used by non-official scorekeepers when their attention has been distracted from the play on field. Supposedly used frequently by former New York Yankees broadcaster Phil Rizzuto.

== Y ==
=== yabo ===
A big home run, usually hit by a hoss player. The term was made colloquially popular in the mid-2010s by commentator Dan Katz aka "Barstool Bigcat", host of the "Pardon My Take" podcast.

=== yacker/yakker ===
A curveball with a big break.

=== yank ===
To pull a fair ball down the foul line. "Damian Miller then yanked a double just inside the third-base bag and down the line, scoring both runners."

=== yard ===
The baseball field. A home run has "left the yard", and whoever hit it went yard. "Doing yardwork" is hitting many home runs or otherwise exhibiting power.

=== yellow hammer ===
A sharp-breaking curveball. Named after the yellowhammer, a bird that dives steeply to catch prey.

=== yips ===
A condition in which a player, usually a pitcher, loses control over the direction of his throws. "Rick Ankiel was transitioned to a position player due to developing a case of the yips on the mound."

== Z ==
=== zeroes ===
- A no-hitter or perfect game, so called because the line score shown on the scoreboard is 0–0–0, though it is subjective when referring to a no-hitter and perfect games, because the opposing team can make errors. However, it will normally show as 0–0–0 (no runs, no hits, no errors) on the scoreboard.

- A pitcher on a scoreless streak is said to be "throwing zeroes."

=== zinger ===
A hard-hit line drive base hit

=== zip ===
Speed. A pitcher with a good fastball is said to have zip on the ball.

=== zone ===
- The strike zone.
- A pitcher is said to be "in the zone" not only by throwing strikes but by maintaining his focus and throwing pitches that get batters out. "You hear about pitchers being in the zone and stuff like that, and that's what I was doing. I was zoned in. I was throwing the right pitch every time, and until the kid got the hit, I honestly didn't even realize."

== See also ==
- Baseball statistics
