= Smith Island =

Smith Island or Smith's Island may refer to the following places:

== Antarctica ==
- Smith Islands, Wilkes Land
- Smith Island (South Shetland Islands)

== Australia ==
- Smith Islands National Park, Queensland
- Smith Island (South Australia)

== Bermuda ==
- Smith's Island, Bermuda

== Canada ==
- Smith Island (British Columbia), off the mouth of the Skeena River
- Smith Island (Frobisher Bay, Nunavut)
- Smith Island (Hudson Bay, Nunavut)
- Smith Island (Ontario), an island in Ontario

== India ==
- Smith Island (Andaman and Nicobar Islands)

== Japan ==
- Smith Island (Japan)

== United States ==
- Smith Island (Alaska)
- Smith Island (California)
- Smith Island (Connecticut), in the Thimble Islands
- Smith Island (Illinois), in Kankakee River State Park, Illinois
- Smith Island, Maryland
- Smith Island (North Carolina), now known as Bald Head Island
- Smith Island, Virginia
- Smith Island (Washington)
  - Smith Island Light
- Smith's Island Recreation Area, Pleasant Valley Township, Scott County, Iowa

== See also ==
- Smith's Island (disambiguation)
- Smith Island cake, a region-specific traditional cuisine of Smith Island, Maryland, U.S.
- Smith Island cottontail, a probably extinct rabbit subspecies
