= Minnie A. Caine =

American four-masted wooden schooner

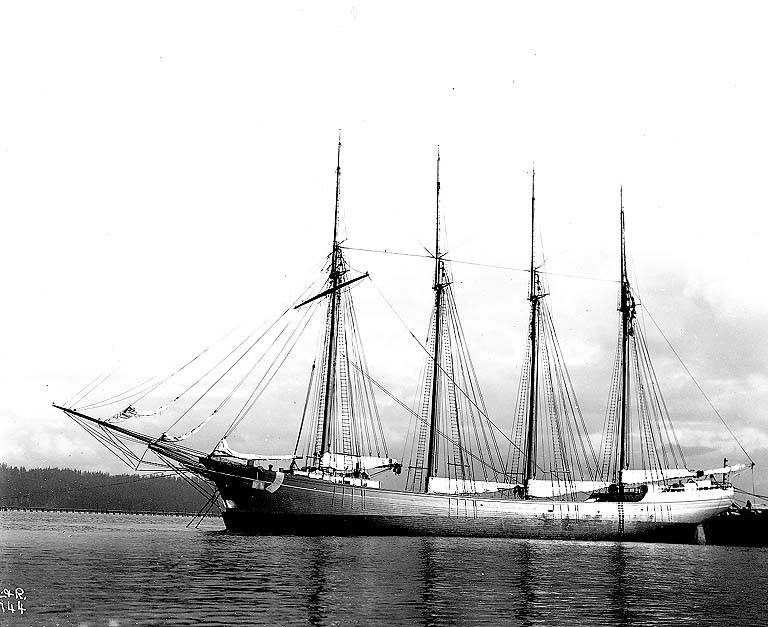
- Schooner Minnie A. Caine anchored in harbor

History

United States
- Owner: 1900–1902: E.E. Caine/Ch. Nelson; 1903–1931: Charles Nelson Co.; 1931–1939: Olaf C. Olsen
- Port of registry: 1900–1902: Seattle; 1903–1931: San Francisco; 1931–1939: Los Angeles
- Builder: Moran Brothers
- Cost: $55,000 ($1,500,000 in 2020 dollars (Note: The approximate value converted to 2020 dollars, based on a standard adjustment of the 1913 dollar value using the Consumer Price Index as calculated by United States Department of Labor.))
- Laid down: December, 1899
- Launched: October 6, 1900
- Out of service: Dec 1901 – Sep 1902 (grounding); Sep 1917 – Jun 1918 (fire on board); Aug 1926 – Mar 1931 (boneyard)
- Reclassified: Fishing barge, Apr 1931
- Refit: Rigging removed, Apr 1931
- Identification: US Official Number 93086; Code letters KQJM
- Fate: Grounded, September 24, 1939; Wreckage burnt, December 24, 1939

General characteristics
- Tonnage: 880 GT; 779 NT
- Length: 195.5 feet (59.6 m)
- Beam: 41.0 feet (12.5 m)
- Depth: 15.2 feet (4.6 m)
- Decks: one
- Propulsion: wind
- Boats & landing craft carried: one
- Crew: 10 (1900–1931); 2 (1931–1939)

Minnie A. Caine was a four-masted wooden schooner built by Seattle shipbuilding the Moran Brothers in 1900. One of the schooner's initial short-term co-owners, Elmer Caine, named her after his wife, Minnie. From 1900 to 1926, the schooner was operated out of San Francisco by Charles Nelson Co., one of the largest transporters of lumber in the United States at the time. The schooner transported lumber across the Pacific Ocean from the Pacific Northwest to ports in Australia and Americas, but after 1920, her scope of operations became limited to the West Coast lumber trade. By 1926, the company could no longer run a sailing ship profitably, and the Minnie A. Caine was moored in a marine boneyard in California.

In 1931, the schooner was purchased by Olaf C. Olsen and turned into an unrigged fishing barge operating off the Santa Monica Pier. After a severe storm in September 1939, the Minnie A. Caine was grounded in Santa Monica Bay. Three months later, her wreckage became a threat to a California highway and had to be incinerated. A cabin clock from the Minnie A. Caine is preserved on the C.A. Thayer in the San Francisco Maritime National Historical Park.

The schooner became widely known for a series of incidents immortalized by her portrayal in literature. Twice, the Minnie A. Caine suffered damage that amounted to 50% of her cost, but was successfully salvaged. The salvage operation after her grounding in 1901 lasted three months and was featured in Scientific American. The fire that almost destroyed the schooner in 1917 in Adelaide inspired fiction from Peter Kyne, Joan Lowell, and Corey Ford.

The Cradle of the Deep, an autobiography written by silent movie actress Joan Lowell in March 1929, topped the non-fiction category of The New York Times Best Seller list. The autobiography purported that Lowell had spent her childhood on the Minnie A. Caine, and provided details about many unusual and frightening experiences. It was soon discovered that the autobiography was a hoax, resulting in a nationwide literary scandal. Later that year, Corey Ford published Salt Water Taffy, a parody of The Cradle of the Deep that in turn, also became a bestseller.

== Construction ==
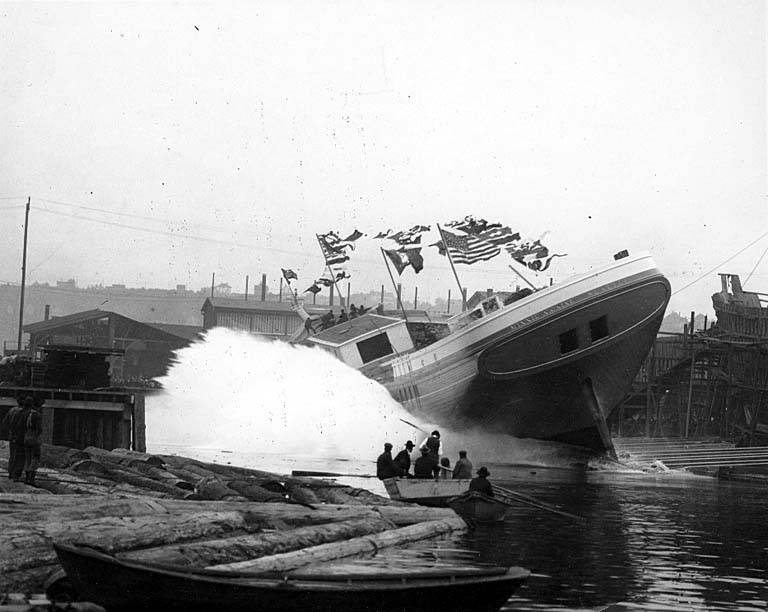
The Minnie A. Caine's launch from Moran Brothers' dock

Construction of the Minnie A. Caine began in Seattle in December 1899. At the time, Seattle was benefiting from the early years of the Nome Gold Rush, which propelled the small town to its later prosperity. One of the beneficiaries of the rush was Seattle citizen and a future millionaire Elmer Caine, who made his starting capital by transporting eager new colonists from Seattle to Nome and other Alaskan ports, rising from the captain and ticket agent of a small steamer to a prominent shipowner.

In 1899, aiming to diversify shipping interests and maximize profits, Caine ordered several vessels built simultaneously, with the intent to finance them in partnership with other shipowners. Unlike the other ships, which were built to service coastal Alaskan routes, the Minnie A. Caine was designed for the long-distance lumber trade. Caine named the vessel after his wife, Minnie, although he owned only approximately ⅓ of the ship. Half belonged to the Charles Nelson Co., a San Francisco shipping company that specialized in lumber trade, and the remaining one-sixth was owned by local associates of Caine from Seattle.

The Minnie A. Caine was the first sailing ship constructed by the Seattle shipbuilding company Moran Brothers, which generally specialized in steam-powered vessels. The vessel's price was $55,000 ($1,500,000 in 2020 dollars). One worker died during the ship's construction when the scaffolding collapsed in May 1900. The construction was supervised by George Monk, Ed Monk's father. On October 6, 1900, at 2:30 pm, in front of 3,000 spectators, the Minnie A. Caine was launched broadside, creating a spectacular splash. The same day, the vessel was christened by Nellie Moran, Robert Moran's daughter.

== Specifications ==
The Minnie A. Caine was a wooden, single-deck, four-masted schooner with two tiers of beams. She was 195.5 feet (59.6 m) long, 41.0 feet (12.5 m) wide and 15.2 feet (4.6 m) deep, and designed to be operated by a crew of ten. All four masts were equipped with topmasts; the foremast was outfitted with a single yard and a square sail.

The schooner could hold up to 1,000,000 lineal feet (300,000 m) of lumber (1,000 M). Up to 30% of the load could be placed on a deck that was constructed with a minimum of fixtures and equipment. She was equipped with bow and stern ports to facilitate lumber loading and unloading operations.

== History of voyages ==
=== Lumber trade, 1900–1919 ===
Pacific theater of Minnie A. Caine voyages.

After her launch, the Minnie A. Caine was utilized in the trans-Pacific lumber trade. She typically carried a full load of lumber from Washington state or British Columbia to ports in Australia, Hawaii, Mexico, Chile, or Peru. Until the late 1910s, the economics of the trans-Pacific lumber trade depended on payment opportunities for return cargoes. Return cargo loads typically included a load of coal from Newcastle, Australia to Honolulu where coal was in demand for the local sugar industry, followed by a load of sugar for San Francisco. Alternatively, a load of coal could be taken from Australia all the way to the Pacific Northwest; for example, in 1907 the Minnie A. Caine brought coal to Nanaimo, British Columbia and loaded her next cargo of lumber at the same port.

The Minnie A. Caine's most typical cyclic voyage was the Seattle–Sydney–Newcastle–Honolulu–San Francisco–Seattle route. On average, this route took her nine months. A one-way trip to Australia lasted approximately three months, and the loading and unloading processes were complicated, so docking could take weeks, after which the schooner often waited for return-trip cargo. This route was also the Minnie A. Caine's maiden voyage. She was scheduled to leave Puget Sound for Sydney on October 25, 1900. From the day of launch, the Minnie A. Caine's captain was J. K. Olsen. (Note: Seattle Post-Intelligencer reported Captain Olsen as the schooner's captain during her launch on October 6, 1900, and according to the port records published in the Seattle Times at the time, captain Olsen took the schooner on her first voyage. However, Lloyd's Register of British and Foreign Shipping lists "H. Oleson" as the Minnie A. Caine's captain for the first two years, before switching to "J.K. Olsen" in 1903.)

Although initially the Minnie A. Caine operated under multiple owners, by 1903, Charles Nelson Co. has consolidated the ownership of the schooner and re-registered her to the port of San Francisco. The company operated multiple vessels and was growing to become one of the largest lumber transporters in the United States.

==== The grounding of 1901 ====
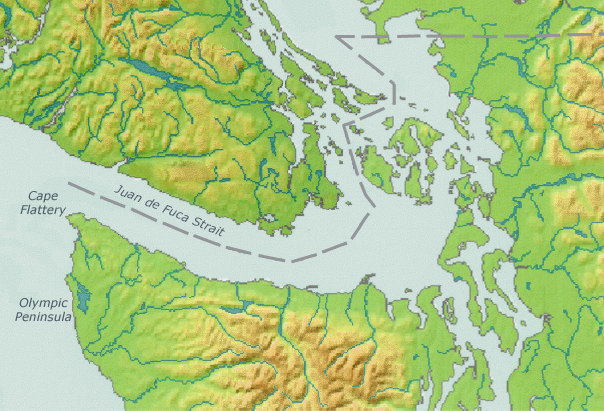
Locality of the accident in the strait of Juan de Fuca.

The Minnie A. Caine's maiden voyage did not return to Seattle until December 23, 1901, having been delayed in San Francisco port by the "strike trouble" there. Her next assignment was to pick up a load of lumber from Chemainus, a logging town in British Columbia, and deliver it to Callao, the main port of Peru.

The schooner left Port Townsend, Washington on December 24, 1901. As she should pass through Haro Strait and the narrow passages around Salt Spring Island, she was pulled by a small 67 GT-ton tug, Magic. On Christmas Eve, as the coupled ships were passing Victoria, British Columbia in the northeastern part of Strait of Juan de Fuca, it encountered a severe storm that covered the entire area and was described as "the worst storm seen in many years."

The roll of the larger vessel—the Minnie A. Caine—soon reached critical amplitude, and at 2:00 a.m., the hawser had to be severed to save the Magic from overturning. (Note: Although in less detailed accounts of the accident, some sources seem to suggest that the hawser was torn by the storm. In particular, The Seattle Times wrote:"...she broke from the tug..." and "Almost immediately the tow lines parted and ... the craft drifted apart." A local marine historian, Horace McCurdy, also recorded: "The tow line parted almost immediately...") The steam-powered Magic managed to reach Port Townsend safely, pouring machine oil around herself to "keep the seas down." The crew of the Minnie A. Caine "heroically" attempted to sail through the storm, but the gale gradually ripped all her sails, and the schooner ended up thrown ashore on a rocky beach on northwestern Smith Island. (Note: Some later sources reported that this grounding occurred during the Minnie A. Caine's maiden voyage, which is obviously incorrect.)

The crew was safe and found refuge inside the Smith Island lighthouse. Subsequent inspection of the schooner revealed damage to her bottom, and she was generally believed to be a complete loss. At the time, the estimated cost of salvage and repair—from $60,000 to $65,000 (from $1,600,000 to $1,700,000 in 2020 dollars)—was higher than her original price.

==== Salvage operation of 1902 ====
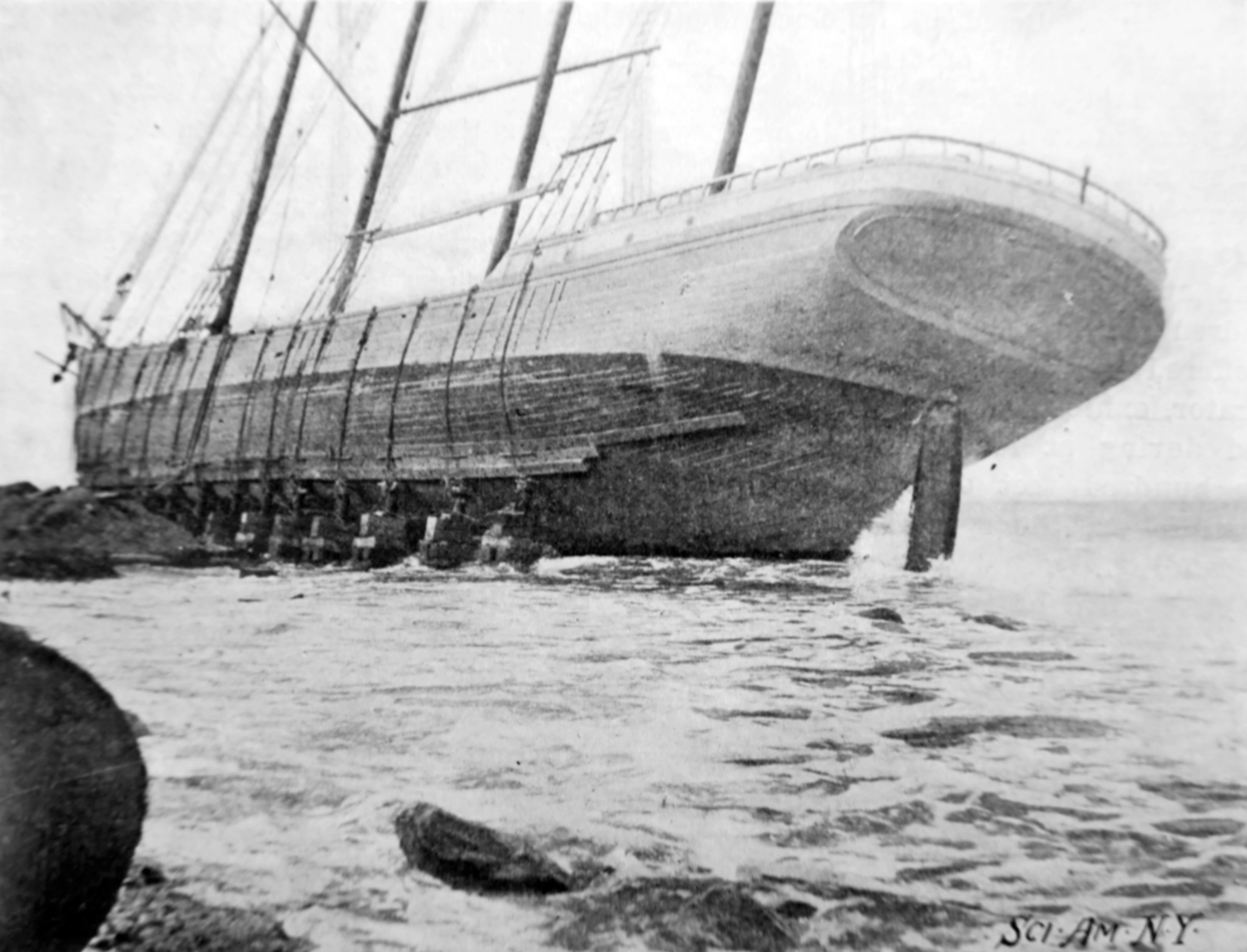
The Minnie A. Caine stranded on Smith Island.

It turned out that only Elmer Caine's share of the schooner was covered by insurance (in the amount of $17,500 ($465,000 in 2020 dollars)). The largest share, owned by Charles Nelson, was uninsured, and he sent his nephew, James Tyson, to investigate the possibility of salvage to the avoid $35,000 ($930,000) loss. The damage to the ship was not as severe as originally feared, but re-launching the vessel was problematic. Charles Nelson Company and Caine's insurance underwriters joined forces to organize the salvage, but all offered bids were too high.

Finally, the parties agreed that Robert Moran of Moran Brothers would attempt the salvage. The operation was led by Moran employee Captain Klitgaard. The salvage became "widely followed" and its details were featured in the Scientific American. The operation was complicated by the remote location of the wreck site, as all supplies, including fresh water, had to be delivered from Port Townsend. Caine allocated another of his ships, the tug Wallowa, to assist with transportation. The tug transported supplies to host and feed the 40 people involved in the operation, and brought back surviving fittings, including the removed topmasts,) from Smith Island.

The actual salvage started in February 1902. The 40 workers used heavy timber to construct skids to direct the schooner into the water. They employed hydraulic jackscrews to dislodge her from the sand onto the skids while the Wallowa pulled the Minnie A. Caine towards the water. The schooner was moved 45 feet, but a March storm destroyed weeks of work, pushing the schooner back to its original location. The procedure had to be restarted in April. The Wallowa attempted to pull the vessel 85 feet towards the water, but her power was insufficient. On May 4, a more powerful tug, the Tyee, from the Puget Sound Tug Boat Co., was chartered, but it took the simultaneous application of two tugs—the Tyee and the Tacoma—on May 9 to return Minnie A. Caine to the water.

The schooner was tugged to the Moran Brothers' dock in Seattle, where she underwent repairs until starting a voyage to San Francisco in September 1902. The salvage operation ended up costing almost $20,000 ($530,000), with subsequent repairs at Moran's costing an additional $10,000 ($270,000), which amounted to almost half the vessel's value. Because Elmer Caine used his own tug and men during the salvage operation, he ended up owning a 50% share of the vessel. However, by 1903, he sold his share to Charles Nelson Co. which became the Minnie A. Caine's sole owner.

==== 1906–1909 incidents ====
During one of the voyages from Washington state to San Francisco in November 1906, the Minnie A. Caine saved the crew of another San Franciscan schooner, the Emma Caudina, which was wrecked off Grays Harbor. Three years later, on December 27, 1909, the Minnie A. Caine itself reached Grays Harbor in miserable condition after encountering a typhoon. The schooner was sailing from Haiphong, French Indochina, to Bellingham, Washington, and the typhoon carried away all her sails and destroyed most of her provisions. The crew was suffering from severe hunger. Captain J.K. Olsen became stricken with heart disease, and on arrival was taken to the Hoquiam hospital in critical condition. G. Nelson became the Minnie A. Caine's new captain.

==== Australian incidents of 1917–1918 ====
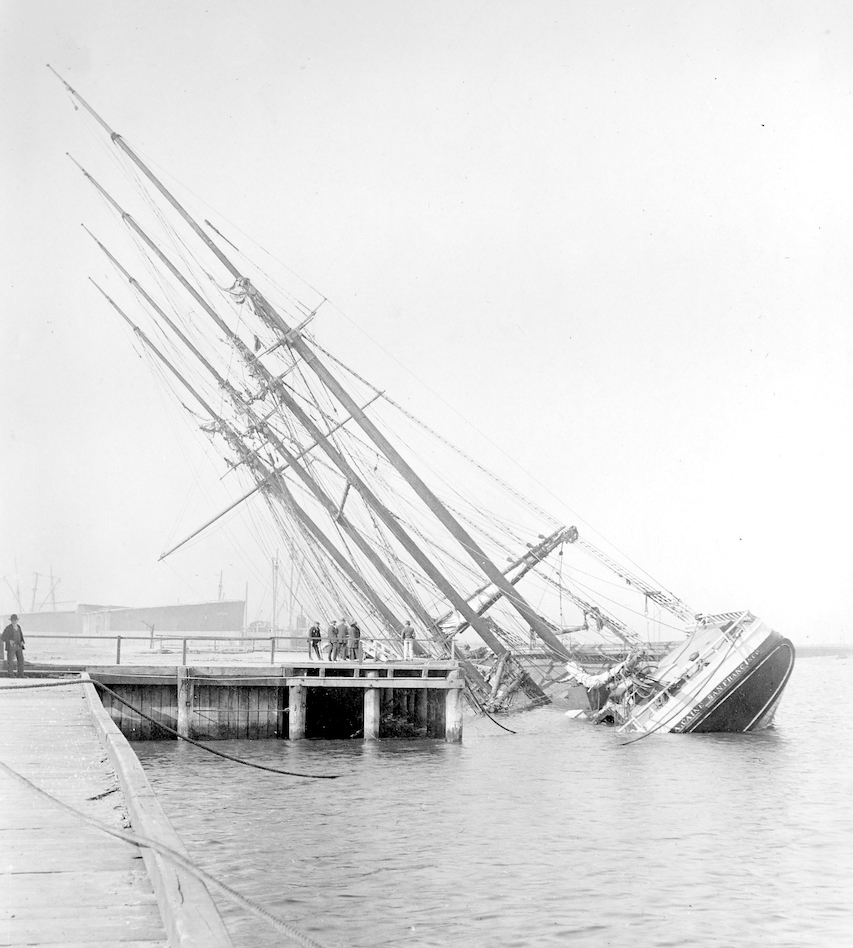
The Minnie A. Caine half-sunk in Port Adelaide after the fire.

For the 1917 voyage to Australia, Captain G. Nelson was replaced by Captain Nicholas Wagner. On August 19, the Minnie A. Caine arrived at Port Adelaide with 960,000 lineal feet (290,000 m) of lumber and 450 imperial gallons (2,000 L; 540 US gal) of gasoline. Unloading was scheduled to finish at the Corporation Wharf by September 4; however, at 6:30 p.m. on September 3, a fire erupted in the schooner's lower hold. The captain's wife and their three children made a hasty escape to a nearby hotel while the port's fire brigade, reinforcements from the city, the captain, and a few crew members fought the fire. The gasoline was safely jettisoned, but the fire was not contained until 10 p.m., when the firefighters were assisted by a heavy rain. The schooner was eventually half-sunk from the amount of water poured in to fight the fire, her masts resting on the surface of the wharf.

The fire "almost completely destroyed the ship." The rapid progress of the fire from a section used to store sails raised suspicions of an arson. A special inquiry into the cause of the fire was held on September 20, but "it was not considered desirable to disclose" its findings to the public.

The schooner was moved to a dry dock of A. McFarlane & Sons in Birkenhead to assess the damage. The burned area was 50 ft × 70 ft (15 m × 21 m) and went 15 feet (4.6 m) deep. The sternpost, poop deck, and a number of knees in the aft section needed to be replaced completely. The knee replacement was of particular concern, as at the time, there was no sufficiently large timber available in Australia, raising doubts if that schooner could be repaired in Adelaide.

Despite all the difficulties, A. McFarlane & Sons repaired the schooner "satisfactorily" by January 1918, although test runs and repairs of residual leakage continued until March. The overall cost of the repairs was 5,500 Australian pounds ($25,795 in 1917 US dollars (Note: In 1917 US dollars. The exchange rate used (1£=$4.69) is based on the historical 1917 exchange rate of US dollar vs. pound sterling and the 1917 exchange rate of pound sterling vs. Australian pound) or $574,267 in 2020 dollars (Note: The approximate value converted to 2020 dollars, based on a standard adjustment of the 1917 dollar value using the Consumer Price Index as calculated by United States Department of Labor.)). The Minnie A. Caine was unable to leave Adelaide in March, however, because she became the first ship arrested in the port in years on the charge of not settling ship survey account amounting to 42 Australian pounds. The case went to Australian Admiralty Court, which eventually cleared the schooner and captain of the charge. Minnie A. Caine's ordeal in Adelaide finally ended on June 19, 1918, when the schooner sailed to San Francisco. By that time, one of the captain's sons was old enough to marry a local girl from Semaphore neighborhood of Adelaide.

=== 1920–1926 lumber trade ===
After World War I, the economics of the trans-Pacific lumber trade changed. Advances in shipbuilding gave the advantage to steam-powered vessels, gradually rendering the concept of a sailing lumber schooner archaic. The building of sailing ships effectively ceased after 1905, and moreover, the end of World War I flooded the market with a fleet of steamers no longer needed for hostilities. On the other hand, the Hawaiian sugar industry had switched from coal to oil, and it was less and less profitable to carry coal as a return cargo from Australia.

By 1921, Charles Nelson Co. was one of the largest lumber trading companies in United States. Unlike most of its competitors, it hadn't gotten rid of its sailing vessels prior to World War I. In the changed economy, the company transferred its lumber schooners from the trans-Pacific lumber trade to the West Coast lumber trade, delivering lumber from the Pacific Northwest to San Francisco. Moreover, the schooners no longer sailed this route; instead, they were tugged along the coast by a steam schooner also loaded with lumber, or by a tug. This approach permitted the operation of schooners with a minimal crew of less-experienced sailors, saving money on wages and keeping the transport rates down.

By 1919, Captain J. K. Olsen returned to command of the Minnie A. Caine, and the schooner began a cycle of tug-assisted voyages, mainly from Port Angeles or Mukilteo in Washington State to San Francisco, and occasionally as far as Mexico. By 1923, the Minnie A. Caine was the last sailing vessel operated by that Charles Nelson Co. By 1926, even this method of lumber transport became unprofitable. Her last voyage was from Port Angeles; the schooner arrived in San Francisco on August 8, 1926, and was later towed to the marine boneyard in Alameda, California.

=== Fishing barge ===
By 1931, strained by the Great Depression, the Charles Nelson Co. was actively selling unneeded vessels. Simultaneously, Captain Olaf C. Olsen, (Note: In some sources, erroneously "Olson." Apparently no relation to J.K. Olsen, the captain of the Minnie A. Caine for many years.) a "square-jawed Norwegian" and one of many Pacific Coast sailors formerly involved in the West Coast lumber trade, discovered a business opportunity in operating a fishing barge. Since 1925, he had successfully operated the barque Narwhal in this capacity, and formed the Malibu Maritime Corporation. After selling the Narwhal to a film studio, in April 1931 Olsen purchased the Minnie A. Caine to turn it into a fishing barge operating off the Santa Monica Pier.

The schooner was tugged along the California coast from the boneyard in Alameda to San Pedro, where her masts were cut off. She was subsequently reclassified as a barge with a crew of two, and registered to the Malibu Maritime Corporation with her home port listed as Los Angeles. In May 1931, the Minnie A. Caine was anchored for the summer in Santa Monica Bay, not far from the Santa Monica Pier.

For the next eight years, the Minnie A. Caine spent summers anchored in the bay, and Captain Olaf C. Olsen operated a small boat to bring fishermen to his barge. The ticket was 50 cents; during the Depression years, a kid could fish on the Minnie A. Caine for a full day and bring home enough fish to sell it for spending money for a couple of weeks and the next ticket. At night, it was rumored that "merry" parties were held on the vessel, where alcohol was served. A piano was delivered to Minnie A. Caine for entertainment. During the winter months, the former schooner was moored off the docks in San Pedro.

==== The grounding of 1939 ====
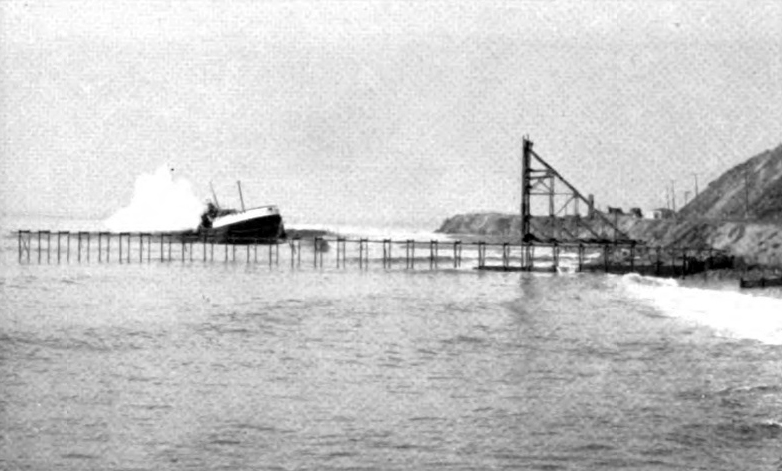
The Minnie A. Caine on the shore of Santa Monica Bay, December 1939.

During the night of September 24, 1939, after an unprecedentedly hot summer, Santa Monica Bay was hit by a severe storm, with gales reaching 65 miles per hour (105 km/h). At the time, Captain Olsen, five crew members, and an unidentified number of guests were on board. Anchored in the bay, the Minnie A. Caine rode out the storm six miles off the Santa Monica Pier. When the old anchor chain failed, the crew was too slow to cast the spare anchor, and the former schooner was thrown onto the shore at 34.038°N 118.554°W, by the intersection of Sunset Boulevard and then Roosevelt Highway (now Pacific Coast Highway, part of California State Route 1).

All guests and the six crew members were safe. The guests were transported ashore by small boats before the worst of the storm hit, but the crew members had to be rescued later that night by the Coast Guard. The next day, after a futile attempt to free the vessel with tugs, the crew discovered serious damage to her keel. The Minnie A. Caine was written off as total loss and eventually abandoned. During the next several weeks, the grounded vessel was served as amusement for the local residents, who drove north of downtown of Santa Monica to observe the wreckage.

==== The fallout of the grounding ====
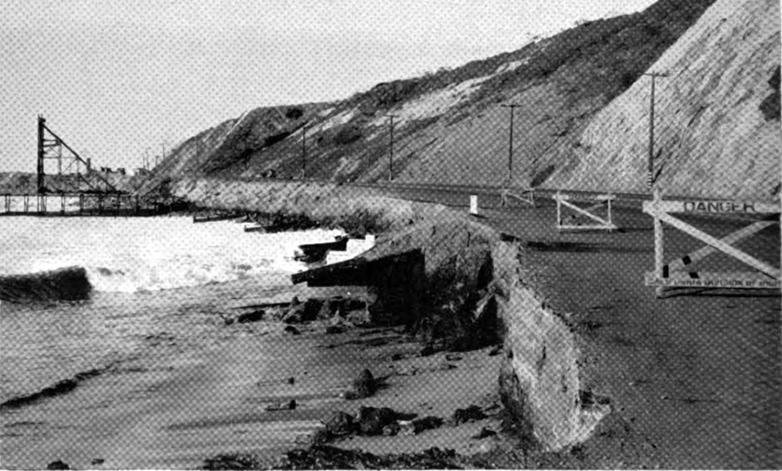
Roosevelt Highway damage caused by the wreckage in Santa Monica Bay.

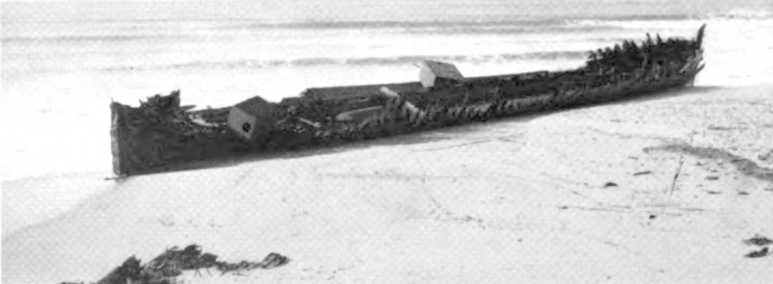
Charred remains of the Minnie A. Caine, December 24, 1939

Three months after her wreck, the Minnie A. Caine created new problems for the city of Santa Monica and the California Highway Commission. A sandbank had quickly formed, connecting the grounded vessel to the shore and disturbing the intricate flow of currents inside the Santa Monica Bay. As a result, ocean waves started battering and cutting into a 700-foot (210 m) section of California State Route 1. By December 1939, 4,000 cubic yards (3,100 m^{3}) of berm had washed off, causing erosion of the roadway.

As an emergency measure, 500 tons of riprap were dumped along the highway and one last attempt was made to free the vessel. After the attempt proved unsuccessful, a call was put out through the newspapers to salvage the wreckage for timber. When this produced few results, the decision was made to burn the wreckage, and Captain Olsen signed abandonment papers. While the engineers prepared the burn, an additional 500 tons of riprap were dumped along the damaged portion of the highway.

After pouring 600 US gallons (2,300 L) of fuel oil and gasoline over the Minnie A. Caine, highway engineers set her on fire at 1 a.m. on December 22, 1939. Many Santa Monica residents gathered to observe the fire. The fire continued through the next day, and it soon became apparent that additional fuel was needed to ensure that the ship's 27-inch (690 mm) water-soaked hull would burn. On December 23, 5,400 US gallons (20,000 L) of crude oil were added to the fire, followed by another 2,800 US gallons (11,000 L) of oil later in the day. By December 24, the fire was out, but a portion of the vessel remained stuck the sand.

The engineers feared that the remaining portion of the ship would continue disrupting the currents, and suggested using explosives to finish the destruction. This measure, however, was protested by concerned local residents, who feared that an explosion might trigger landslides and damage their properties. Over the next month, the tide dispersed the remaining wreckage and the threat to the highway was eliminated.

== In popular culture ==
=== The Cradle of the Deep ===
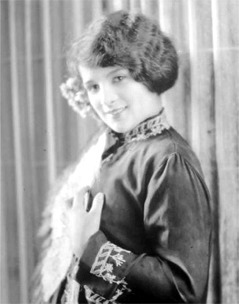
Joan Lowell

In March 1929, when the Minnie A. Caine was moored in the California boneyard, Simon & Schuster published an autobiography of Joan Lowell, a silent movie actress whose largest accomplishment was a small role in Charlie Chaplin's The Gold Rush. Titled The Cradle of the Deep, the autobiography portrayed the first 17 years of Lowell's life as being spent on the Minnie A. Caine. According to the book, Lowell was the captain's daughter, who was taken onto the schooner when she was just eleven months old and spent her next 17 years barefoot on the ship in the company of her father and the all-male crew.

Peppered with "salty cuss words" and "mildly sexy" scenes, the book was considered controversial, at the time which added to its popularity. The biography purports that the Minnie A. Caine belonged to Lowell's father, and made most of her voyages in the South Pacific. The story is a mix of strange episodes and frightening experiences, including a dance of virgins on Atafu, Lowell playing strip poker with the crew, Lowell's father dissipating a waterspout with rifle shots, a near-death experience when Lowell and all the crew were stricken with scurvy, and finally, the ship's conflagration and sinking in Australia, followed by Lowell's 3-mile (4.8 km) swim to the safety of a lighthouse.

The book received multiple positive reviews from different sources, including The Washington Post, Time, Life, Los Angeles Times, etc. Moreover, in an era when book clubs functioned as the most important distribution channel for books, in March 1929, The Cradle of the Deep was voted the Book of the Month by the jury of the highly influential Book of the Month Club. The book became a bestseller, topping the non-fiction category of The New York Times Best Seller list.

The Cradle of the Deep was subsequently exposed as a hoax when Lowell's school records from Berkeley, California were produced, proving that she hadn't spent her life at sea, and the Minnie A. Caine itself was found unscathed in the Alameda boneyard. Joan Lowell's real name was Helen Joan Wagner, and at the age of 15, together with her mother and two brothers, she did indeed accompany her father, Nicholas Wagner, on his one-year assignment as the captain of the Minnie A. Caine on the schooner's unlucky voyage to Australia in 1917–1918.

The exposure led to a literary scandal of "an astonishing magnitude" that echoed across all United States. It was further exacerbated by the fact that the hoax was motivated by profit-seeking, and that neither Lowell nor the publishers ever admitted the forgery. The Book of the Month Club offered refunds to its subscribers, and The Cradle of the Deep soon ended up on bookstore shelves of discounted books.

==== Salt Water Taffy ====
Three months after the exposure of The Cradle of the Deep as a hoax, American humorist Corey Ford published a parody of Lowell's fake autobiography. Titled Salt Water Taffy; or, Twenty thousand leagues away from the sea; the almost incredible autobiography of Capt. Ezra Triplett's seafaring daughter, by June Triplett, the parody was published under the pseudonym "June Triplett" and dedicated to Corey Ford. The book is a "witty, well-written inversion of The Cradle of the Deep", as Ford effectively used the tools of parody — inversion and amplification — to expose the absurdity of Lowell's book.

In Salt Water Taffy, Lowell is cast as a "vain and naïve heroine." The ship's name is also purposely distorted throughout the book; different characters refer to it as the Carrie L. Maine, the Minnie J. Cohan, the Minnie I. Cohen, etc. The parody was a great success, as Salt Water Taffy itself became a bestseller, eventually surpassing the sales of The Cradle of the Deep.

=== Cappy Ricks and Popeye ===
The eventful life of the Minnie A. Caine, including the fire in Adelaide on September 3, 1917, was an inspiration for some of Peter Kyne's Cappy Ricks stories and the subsequent silent movie of the same name shot in 1921 by Paramount Pictures.

A number of authors have claimed that Captain Olaf C. Olsen, while he was operating the Narwhal and the Minnie A. Caine as fishing barges near the Santa Monica Pier, was the inspiration and prototype for the cartoon character Popeye created by American cartoonist E. C. Segar. However, an alternative theory states that Popeye was inspired by Rocky Fiegel from Chester, Illinois.

== Aftermath ==
Elmer Caine, who ordered and built the Minnie A. Caine, died early and unexpectedly in 1908, leaving his wife, Minnie, with an estate of over $1 million ($27,000,000 in 2020 dollars). She survived her husband by 14 years, dying in San Francisco in 1922 while the Minnie A. Caine was still carrying lumber throughout the Pacific. She didn't live to see her name twisted in the Corey Ford's parody.

Moran Brothers built only one more sailing ship: the barkentine James Johnson. The company failed during World War I, and in 1916 was purchased by Todd Shipyards Corporation. The Charles Nelson Co. over-expanded and failed during the Depression. On the other hand, A. McFarlane & Sons, which repaired the Minnie A. Caine after the fire in Adelaide, still existed as of 2013, the fourth generation of McFarlanes still building and repairing sailing yachts. Captain Olaf C. Olsen died in Santa Monica in 1950 at the age of 70.

While the Minnie A. Caine was moored in the boneyard, it was occasionally scrapped for parts. Her only life boat ended up on the four-masted steel barque Moshulu, which was also briefly owned by the Charles Nelson Co. As late as 1947, the lifeboat, displaying the name of its original ship, was still seen on the barque. The cabin clock from the Minnie A. Caine ended up installed on the three-masted schooner C.A. Thayer, and was still intact in 1958 when the schooner made its last voyage and was preserved at the San Francisco Maritime National Historical Park.

Joan Lowell suffered social and financial disappointment when the authenticity of her autobiography was debunked. She attempted other literary endeavors unsuccessfully, and ended up leaving for Brazil, where she died in 1967. As of 2012, The Cradle of the Deep is still remembered as one of "the greatest hoaxes of all times" and Joan Lowell as a "grandmother of literary hoaxes." Nevertheless, her fraudulent autobiography is said to have immortalized the Minnie A. Caine.

== See also ==
- Moran Brothers
- Joan Lowell

== Literature cited ==
- "CPI Inflation Calculator", Bureau of Labor Statistics, Washington: United States Department of Labor
- Blethen, Alden J., ed. (December 23, 1899), "A New Nome Ship", Seattle Daily Times, Seattle: The Seattle Times Company, p. 8, ISSN 2639-4898, LCCN sn86072007, OCLC 1765328
- Blethen, Alden J., ed. (May 30, 1900), "Was Fatally Hurt", Seattle Daily Times, Seattle: The Seattle Times Company, p. 5, ISSN 2639-4898, LCCN sn86072007, OCLC 1765328
- "Schooner Minnie A. Caine To Be Launched This Afternoon", Seattle Post-Intelligencer, Seattle: Leigh S. J. Hunt, p. 6, October 6, 1900, ISSN 2379-7304, LCCN sn83045604, OCLC 9563195
- "Four-Masted Schooner Minnie A. Caine Launched At Moran Bros.' Shypyards", Seattle Post-Intelligencer, Seattle: Leigh S. J. Hunt, p. 12, October 7, 1900, ISSN 2379-7304, LCCN sn83045604, OCLC 9563195
- Blethen, Alden J., ed. (December 22, 1900), "Expansion of Seattle's shipping", Seattle Daily Times, Seattle: The Seattle Times Company, p. 16, ISSN 2639-4898, LCCN sn86072007, OCLC 1765328
- Annual list of merchant vessels of the United States, vol. 33, Washington: Government Printing Office, 1901, ISSN 0076-650X, LCCN 76606560, OCLC 9336739
- Lloyd's register of shipping, vol. 1, London: Lloyd's Register of British and Foreign Shipping, 1901, LCCN ca08001387, OCLC 16874263
- "Great Gale Hits Coast", Seattle Post-Intelligencer, Seattle: Leigh S. J. Hunt, p. 1, December 27, 1901, ISSN 2379-7304, LCCN sn83045604, OCLC 9563195
- "Schooner Caine Driven Ashore", Seattle Post-Intelligencer, Seattle: Leigh S. J. Hunt, p. 7, December 28, 1901, ISSN 2379-7304, LCCN sn83045604, OCLC 9563195
- "Christmas Storm Severe: Vessels on the Pacific Missing and Others Had Narrow Escapes", New York Times, New York: H.J. Raymond & Co, p. 2, December 29, 1901, ISSN 0362-4331, LCCN sn78004456, OCLC 1645522
- "Northwestern Gale Hard on Vessels", Los Angeles Times, Los Angeles, p. 3, December 30, 1901, ISSN 0458-3035, LCCN sn81004356, OCLC 3638237
- Lloyd's register of shipping, vol. 1, London: Lloyd's Register of British and Foreign Shipping, 1902, LCCN ca08001387, OCLC 16874263
- Blethen, Alden J., ed. (January 2, 1902), "Completes trip today", Seattle Daily Times, Seattle: The Seattle Times Company, p. 8, ISSN 2639-4898, LCCN sn86072007, OCLC 1765328
- Blethen, Alden J., ed. (January 4, 1902), "With the Insurance Folk: Local and Personal", Seattle Daily Times, Seattle: The Seattle Times Company, p. 18, ISSN 2639-4898, LCCN sn86072007, OCLC 1765328
- Blethen, Alden J., ed. (January 4, 1902), "Handy Reference Table for Puget Sound, Corrected Semi-Weekly", Seattle Daily Times, Seattle: The Seattle Times Company, p. 24, ISSN 2639-4898, LCCN sn86072007, OCLC 1765328
- Blethen, Alden J., ed. (January 21, 1902), "Will Save Her", Seattle Daily Times, Seattle: The Seattle Times Company, p. 5, ISSN 2639-4898, LCCN sn86072007, OCLC 1765328
- Blethen, Alden J., ed. (February 10, 1902), "Has a very rough time", Seattle Daily Times, Seattle: The Seattle Times Company, p. 3, ISSN 2639-4898, LCCN sn86072007, OCLC 1765328
- Blethen, Alden J., ed. (May 4, 1902), "May Be Floated Tonight", Seattle Daily Times, Seattle: The Seattle Times Company, p. 6, ISSN 2639-4898, LCCN sn86072007, OCLC 1765328
- Blethen, Alden J., ed. (May 6, 1902), "Caine Still Beached", Seattle Daily Times, Seattle: The Seattle Times Company, p. 4, ISSN 2639-4898, LCCN sn86072007, OCLC 1765328
- Blethen, Alden J., ed. (May 10, 1902), "Minnie E. Caine is afloat", Seattle Daily Times, Seattle: The Seattle Times Company, p. 7, ISSN 2639-4898, LCCN sn86072007, OCLC 1765328
- Blethen, Alden J., ed. (May 11, 1902), "Schooner Caine Arrives", Seattle Daily Times, Seattle: The Seattle Times Company, p. 8, ISSN 2639-4898, LCCN sn86072007, OCLC 1765328
- Blethen, Alden J., ed. (May 13, 1902), "Situation of the rate war", Seattle Daily Times, Seattle: The Seattle Times Company, p. 4, ISSN 2639-4898, LCCN sn86072007, OCLC 1765328
- Blethen, Alden J., ed. (September 30, 1902), "Deep-Sea Vessels", Seattle Daily Times, Seattle: The Seattle Times Company, p. 4, ISSN 2639-4898, LCCN sn86072007, OCLC 1765328
- Lloyd's register of shipping, vol. 1, London: Lloyd's Register of British and Foreign Shipping, 1903, LCCN ca08001387, OCLC 16874263
- Annual list of merchant vessels of the United States, vol. 36, Washington: Government Printing Office, 1904, ISSN 0076-650X, LCCN 76606560, OCLC 9336739
- Lloyd's register of shipping, vol. 1, London: Lloyd's Register of British and Foreign Shipping, 1907, LCCN ca08001387, OCLC 16874263
- Defebaugh, James Elliott, ed. (August 31, 1907), "Among the Northern Redwoods", American Lumberman, vol. 4, no. 1684, Chicago: The American Lumberman, pp. 85–86, ISSN 0096-4425, LCCN sn80000563, OCLC 1916285
- Annual list of merchant vessels of the United States, vol. 40, Washington: Government Printing Office, 1908, ISSN 0076-650X, LCCN 76606560, OCLC 9336739
- Blethen, Alden J., ed. (August 25, 1908), "Captain Caine Found Dead in Bed", Seattle Daily Times, Seattle: The Seattle Times Company, pp. 1, 2, ISSN 2639-4898, LCCN sn86072007, OCLC 1765328
- "Capt. E. E. Caine is found dead", Seattle Post-Intelligencer, Seattle: Leigh S. J. Hunt, p. 1, August 26, 1908, ISSN 2379-7304, LCCN sn83045604, OCLC 9563195
- "The Minnie E. Caine", Newcastle Morning Herald and Miners' Advocate, Newcastle: W. T. Johnson, p. 4, March 11, 1910, LCCN sn89049087, OCLC 19248921
- Lloyd's register of shipping, vol. 1, London: Lloyd's Register of British and Foreign Shipping, 1912, LCCN ca08001387, OCLC 16874263
- Hole, Elmer C., ed. (November 14, 1914), "Overseas Outlook Encouraging", American Lumberman, vol. 4, no. 2061, Chicago: The American Lumberman, p. 51, ISSN 0096-4425, LCCN sn80000563, OCLC 1916285
- "Controlling Interest in Big Shipyard Here Sold to New Yorkers", Seattle Daily Times, Seattle: The Seattle Times Company, p. 1, July 26, 1916, ISSN 2639-4898, LCCN sn86072007, OCLC 1765328
- Wedd, William, ed. (September 4, 1917), "Ship On Fire", Daily Herald, vol. 8, no. 2327, Adelaide: Reginald Pole Blundell, p. 6, OCLC 220843861
- "A Schooner On Fire", The Chronicle, vol. LX, no. 3081, Adelaide: F. Bruden & L. Bonython, p. 31, September 8, 1917, LCCN sn88088316, OCLC 223399004
- "The Sensational Fire On A Schooner At Port Adelaide", The Chronicle, vol. LX, no. 3082, Adelaide: F. Bruden & L. Bonython, p. 26, September 15, 1917, LCCN sn88088316, OCLC 223399004
- Wedd, William, ed. (September 20, 1917), "Shipping Notes", Daily Herald, vol. 8, no. 2341, Adelaide: Reginald Pole Blundell, p. 4, OCLC 220843861
- Wedd, William, ed. (September 22, 1917), "The Burned Schooner", Daily Herald, vol. 8, no. 2343, Adelaide: Reginald Pole Blundell, p. 4, OCLC 220843861
- "Blaze On A Schooner", The Register, vol. LXXXIII, no. 22123, Adelaide: Register Newspapers Ltd., p. 5, October 4, 1917, OCLC 220134555
- Wedd, William, ed. (October 4, 1917), "The Fire on the Minnie E. Caine", Daily Herald, vol. 8, no. 2353, Adelaide: Reginald Pole Blundell, p. 4, OCLC 220843861
- "Australian Shipbuilding", The Register, vol. LXXXIII, no. 22202, Adelaide: Register Newspapers Ltd., p. 3, January 5, 1918, OCLC 220134555
- Wedd, William, ed. (January 17, 1918), "Building Ships", Daily Herald, vol. 8, no. 2442, Adelaide: Reginald Pole Blundell, p. 3, OCLC 220843861
- Wedd, William, ed. (March 1, 1918), "Ship Arrested", Daily Herald, vol. 8, no. 2479, Adelaide: Reginald Pole Blundell, p. 3, OCLC 220843861
- "An Unlucky Ship", Port Adelaide News, vol. 5, no. 27, Port Adelaide: John Ernest Trotman, p. 1, March 8, 1918, OCLC 221518225
- "A Claim Disputed", The Register, vol. LXXXIII, no. 22264, Adelaide: Register Newspapers Ltd., p. 7, March 19, 1918, OCLC 220134555
- "Minnie A. Caine", Port Adelaide News, vol. 5, no. 42, Port Adelaide: John Ernest Trotman, p. 4, June 21, 1918, OCLC 221518225
- "Marine Notes", Seattle Daily Times, Seattle: The Seattle Times Company, p. 13, August 6, 1919, ISSN 2639-4898, LCCN sn86072007, OCLC 1765328
- Lloyd's register of shipping, vol. 1, London: Lloyd's Register of British and Foreign Shipping, 1921, LCCN ca08001387, OCLC 16874263
- "Intercoastal Rate Situation", The Lumber manufacturer and dealer, vol. LXVII, no. 877 (Manufacturer's ed.), St. Louis: Kriechbaum Publishing Company, etc., p. 27, April 8, 1921, LCCN 27009839, OCLC 243888753
- "Mrs. Caine is Dead", Seattle Daily Times, Seattle: The Seattle Times Company, p. 8, March 6, 1922, ISSN 2639-4898, LCCN sn86072007, OCLC 1765328
- "Sailor Girl Writes Memoirs, Following 17 Years at Sea", Washington Post, Washington: Washington Post Co., pp. М6, March 17, 1929, ISSN 2641-0702, LCCN sn82014727, OCLC 8787120
- Luce, Henry R.; Martin, John S., eds. (March 18, 1929), "Skipper's Daughter", Time, vol. XIII, no. 11, New York: Time Inc., p. 52, ISSN 0040-781X, LCCN 25011669, OCLC 1767509
- "New York's Best Sellers", Los Angeles Times, Los Angeles, p. 20, April 14, 1929, ISSN 0458-3035, LCCN sn81004356, OCLC 3638237
- Luce, Henry R.; Martin, John S., eds. (April 15, 1929), "Cradle Rocked", Time, vol. XIII, no. 15, New York: Time Inc., p. 38, ISSN 0040-781X, LCCN 25011669, OCLC 1767509
- Luce, Henry R.; Martin, John S., eds. (June 24, 1929), "Mention", Time, vol. XIII, no. 25, New York: Time Inc., p. 44, ISSN 0040-781X, LCCN 25011669, OCLC 1767509
- Weaver, Joseph B.; Roper, Daniel C., eds. (1931), Merchant vessels of the United States, Washington: United States Government Publishing Office, p. 957, ISSN 0076-650X, LCCN 76606560, OCLC 4057799
- "Yes, It's true", Evening Outlook, vol. LVII, no. 97, Santa Monica: Copley Press, p. 1, April 24, 1931, ISSN 0889-826X, LCCN sn86002230, OCLC 11576124
- "Twenty-nine Believed to Be Dead as 65-Mile Gale Sweeps Coast", Los Angeles Times, Los Angeles, pp. 1–2, September 25, 1939, ISSN 0458-3035, LCCN sn81004356, OCLC 3638237
- "Fight Made to Halt Erosion Started by Stranded Barge", Los Angeles Times, Los Angeles, p. 8, December 18, 1939, ISSN 0458-3035, LCCN sn81004356, OCLC 3638237
- "Officials Puzzled by Hulk in Surf", Los Angeles Times, Los Angeles, pp. 1–2, December 29, 1939, ISSN 0458-3035, LCCN sn81004356, OCLC 3638237
- "Highway No Longer Periled by Erosion", Los Angeles Times, Los Angeles, p. 10, January 14, 1940, ISSN 0458-3035, LCCN sn81004356, OCLC 3638237
- Howe, J. W., ed. (April 1, 1940), "Burning of the Minnie A. Caine" (PDF), California Highways and Public Works, vol. 18, no. 4, Sacramento: Department of Public Works, State of California, pp. 17, 26, ISSN 0008-1159, LCCN 42016684, OCLC 7511628
- Weaver, Joseph B.; Roper, Daniel C., eds. (1942), Merchant vessels of the United States, Washington: United States Government Publishing Office, p. 957, ISSN 0076-650X, LCCN 76606560, OCLC 4057799
- "Captain of Oldtime Sailing Ships Dies", Seattle Daily Times, Seattle: The Seattle Times Company, p. 37, June 9, 1950, ISSN 2639-4898, LCCN sn86072007, OCLC 1765328
- "A McFarlane & Sons", anmm.gov.au, Sydney: Australian National Maritime Museum, 2013
- Berner, Richard C. (1991), Seattle in the 20th century, vol. 1, Seattle: Charles Press, ISBN 0962988901, LCCN 91074159, OCLC 26133085
- Brereton, Bernard John Stephen (1908), The practical lumberman: short methods of figuring lumber, octagon spars, logs, specifications and lumber carrying capacity of vessels (1 ed.), Tacoma: Bernard Brereton, OCLC 71059871
- Colby, Anne (March 14, 2008), "Meet the grandmother of memoir fabricators: Discredited author Margaret Seltzer could learn from her spunky literary predecessor", Los Angeles Times, Los Angeles, pp. E20, ISSN 0458-3035, LCCN sn81004356, OCLC 3638237
- Coleman, William (August 1, 2001), "Is It Possible That an Independent Central Bank Is Impossible? The Case of the Australian Notes Issue Board, 1920–1924", Journal of Money, Credit and Banking, 33 (3), Columbus: Ohio State University Press: 729–748, doi:10.2307/2673891, hdl:1885/24411, JSTOR 2673891, LCCN 70012309, OCLC 1783384
- Colton, J. Ferrell (1954), Windjammers significant: an account of the finest deep-water square-rigged sailing vessels ever constructed, Flagstaff: J. Ferrell Colton & Co., LCCN 55018409, OCLC 1601618
- Dickie, Alexander J. (January 10, 1921), Dickie, Alexander J. (ed.), "Pacific American Merchant Marine" (PDF), Pacific Marine Review, vol. 17, no. 10, San Francisco: James S. Hines, pp. V–XXV, LCCN ca08001872, OCLC 2449383
- Edison, Hali J. (August 1, 1987), "Purchasing Power Parity in the Long Run: A Test of the Dollar-Pound Exchange Rate (1890–1978)", Journal of Money, Credit and Banking, 19 (3), Columbus: Ohio State University Press: 376–387, doi:10.2307/1992083, JSTOR 1992083, LCCN 70012309, OCLC 1783384
- Ford, Thomas F. (March 24, 1929), "Sailor Girl's Tale Spun: Joan Lowell, Lass Who Sailed Before Mast, Relates Life Story in Lively Book", Los Angeles Times, Los Angeles, pp. С11, ISSN 0458-3035, LCCN sn81004356, OCLC 3638237
- Fowler, Chuck (2007), Tall ships on Puget Sound, Images of America, Charleston: Arcadia Publishing, ISBN 978-0738548142, LCCN 2007930682, OCLC 187071060
- Gibbs, Jim (November 12, 1966), "Maritime Memories", Marine Digest, vol. 45, no. 11, Seattle, p. 20, ISSN 0025-3197, LCCN 48004196, OCLC 5879947
- Gibbs, Jim (1968), West Coast Windjammers In Story and Pictures, Stephen A. Richardson Donation (1 ed.), Seattle: Superior Publishing Company, ISBN 0517170604, LCCN 68022361, OCLC 1242
- Githens, Perry (March 22, 1929), Thompson, Edward Kramer (ed.), "The New Books", Life, vol. 93, no. 2420, Chicago: Time Inc., p. 28, ISSN 0024-3019, LCCN sf89099014, OCLC 5391019
- Goble, Alan (1999), The complete index to literary sources in film, London: Bowker-Saur, ISBN 1857392299, OCLC 42888143
- Hanford, Cornelius (1924), Seattle and Environs 1852-1924, vol. 1, Chicago: Pioneer Historical Publishing Company, OCLC 3494902
- Harris, James (2009), Redford, Robert (ed.), Santa Monica Pier : a century on the last great pleasure pier, Santa Monica: Angel City Press, ISBN 978-1883318826, LCCN 2008049686, OCLC 233687106
- Hibbs, Frank W. (August 1, 1905), Dickie, Alexander J. (ed.), "Shipping and Shipbuilding of Puget Sound", Pacific Marine Review, vol. 2, no. 5, San Francisco: James S. Hines, pp. 3–6, LCCN ca08001872, OCLC 2449383
- Hurst, Alexander Anthony (1981), "Disorder and Desinence", The Medley of mast and sail, vol. II, Annapolis: Naval Institute Press, pp. 292–324, ISBN 0870219405, LCCN 80085162, OCLC 7973318
- Huycke, Harold (February 13, 1954a), "Schooner Minnie A. Caine Led Colorful Life After Rescue From California Scrap Heap", Marine Digest, vol. XXXIII, no. 23, Seattle, pp. 6–7, 30, ISSN 0025-3197, LCCN 48004196, OCLC 5879947
- Huycke, Harold (February 20, 1954b), "Schooner Minnie A. Caine Led Colorful Life After Rescue From California Scrap Heap (conclusion)", Marine Digest, vol. XXXIII, no. 24, Seattle, pp. 8–9, 27, ISSN 0025-3197, LCCN 48004196, OCLC 5879947
- Jayne, H. B. (September 1, 1904), Dickie, Alexander J. (ed.), "Around the Yards", Pacific Marine Review, vol. 1, no. 6, San Francisco: James S. Hines, p. 14, LCCN ca08001872, OCLC 2449383
- Jones, John P. (January 3, 2007), "Pier brings back fond memories of the 'fun capital of the world'", Evening Outlook, Santa Monica: Copley Press, pp. A2, ISSN 0889-826X, LCCN sn86002230, OCLC 11576124
- Marshall, Don B. (1984), Oregon shipwrecks (1 ed.), Portland: Binford & Mort Publishing, ISBN 0832304301, LCCN 84071477, OCLC 11509677
- McCurdy, Horace Winslow (1966), Newell, Gordon R.; Fisken, Keith G. (eds.), The H. W. McCurdy Marine History of the Pacific Northwest, vol. 1, Seattle: Superior Publishing Company, LCCN 66025424, OCLC 16690016
- M'Curdy, James G. (July 26, 1902), Munn, Orson Desaix (ed.), "Salvage of the Schooner "Minnie A. Caine"", Scientific American, LXXXVII (4), New York: Munn & Co.: 52, doi:10.1038/scientificamerican07261902-52a, LCCN 04017574, OCLC 1775222
- Oliver, Bet (1998), Ed Monk and the tradition of classic boats, Victoria: Horsdal & Schubart, ISBN 0920663605, LCCN 98216466, OCLC 42772819
- Powers, Dennis M. (2009), Taking the sea: perilous waters, sunken ships, and the true story of the legendary wrecker captains, New York: AMACOM, ISBN 978-0814413531, LCCN 2008021002, OCLC 227033801
- Rakich, Whitney Purvis (2012), Trujillo, Michael (ed.), Savage fakes: Misdirection, fraudulence, and autobiography in the 1920s, Albuquerque: The University of New Mexico, OCLC 869557272
- Simpson, David Mark (February 5, 2015), Hall, Matthew (ed.), "Was 'Popeye' born in Santa Monica?", Santa Monica Daily Press, Santa Monica: Daily Press, OCLC 49666060
- Snowden, Clinton A. (1909), Hanford, Cornelius; Moore, Miles Conway; Tyler, William D.; Chadwick, Stephen J. (eds.), History of Washington: The Rise and Progress of an American State, New York: The Century History Company, LCCN 09028416, OCLC 2827985
- Stokes, Frederick Abbott (July 1, 1929), Harvey, George (ed.), "The Case against the Book Clubs", North American Review, 228 (1), Cedar Falls: University of Northern Iowa: 47–56, ISSN 0029-2397, JSTOR 25110789, LCCN 04012673, OCLC 4604572
- Trott, Harlan (1958), The schooner that came home: the final voyage of the C.A. Thayer, Cambridge: Cornell Maritime Press, LCCN 58059501, OCLC 1673415
