= Please Teacher (film) =

- Opening title card
- Directed by: Stafford Dickens
- Screenplay by: Stafford Dickens
- Based on: an original musical play by K.R.G. Browne, R.P. Weston & Bert Lee
- Produced by: Walter C. Mycroft
- Starring: Bobby Howes; Vera Pearce; René Ray
- Cinematography: Otto Kanturek
- Edited by: Lionel Tomlinson
- Music by: Jack Waller; Joseph Tunbridge; Harry Acres (musical director)
- Production company: Associated British Picture Corporation
- Distributed by: Wardour Films (UK)
- Release dates: 16 February 1937 (London, UK)
- Running time: 75 minutes
- Country: United Kingdom
- Language: English

Please Teacher is a 1937 British comedy film directed by Stafford Dickens and starring Bobby Howes, Vera Pearce and René Ray. It was written by Dickens based on a musical play by K.R.G. Browne, Bert Lee and RP Weston.

== Plot ==
On his 30th birthday, unemployed rogue Tommy Deacon inherits his aunt's fortune, but is informed it has been hidden in a bust of Napoleon in a country house he has also inherited. On discovering the house is now an Academy for Young Ladies, Tommy pretends to be the brother of Anne, one of the girls, in order to gain admittance.

== Cast ==
- Bobby Howes as Tommy Deacon
- Vera Pearce as Petunia Trundle
- René Ray as Ann Trent
- Arthur Chesney as Round
- Wylie Watson as Oswald Clutterbuck
- Bertha Belmore as Agatha Pink
- Lyn Harding as Wing Foo
- Aubrey Dexter as Reeves

== Critical reception ==
The Monthly Film Bulletin wrote: "The story as such is quite unimportant. It is merely a peg on which to hang a series of fantastic episodes and misadventures. The opening is rather slow and labored, but once Tommy reaches the school the fun becomes fast and furious. ... It is all ridiculous, but very good fun."

Kine Weekly wrote: "The success of this musical is its refreshing absence of pretence. From beginning to end it is sheer nonsense, but nonsense so gaily varied and breezily balanced thanks to great teamwork and resourceful direction, as to promote unabated laughter."

The Sydney Morning Herald wrote, "Although a little slow in getting in to their stride, because of the sluggish opening of the story, the actors manage to vitalise a feeble plot with enough comical characterisation to make it acceptable as average entertainment."
