= So You Won't Talk =

So You Won't Talk may refer to:

- So You Won't Talk (1935 film), a British comedy film
- So You Won't Talk (1940 film), an American comedy crime film
