= Loving Lies =

1924 film

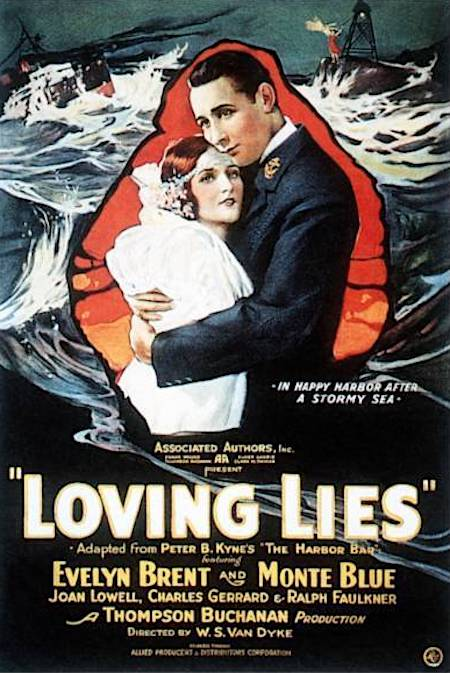
- Film poster
- Directed by: W. S. Van Dyke
- Written by: Thompson Buchanan
- Based on: "The Harbor Bar" by Peter B. Kyne
- Starring: Evelyn Brent
- Production company: Associated Authors
- Distributed by: Allied Producers & Distributors Corporation
- Release date: January 22, 1924
- Running time: 7 reels
- Country: United States
- Language: Silent (English intertitles)

Loving Lies is a 1924 silent American silent drama film directed by W. S. Van Dyke and starring Evelyn Brent and Monte Blue.

== Plot ==
As described in a film magazine review, just after Ellen Craig has married Dan Stover, captain of a tug boat, she discovers that his new boss, Tom Hayden, is a former sweetheart of hers that she had discarded. Tom cleverly uses his position to arouse jealousy and marital misunderstandings between Dan and Ellen, and succeeds in this by exposing the white lies which Dan has told his wife to keep her from worrying about him while he is at sea. The climax of these complications is reached when Dan is called upon to brave a severe storm, taking his tug to rescue a steamship on which his wife is fleeing with Tom, who has finally falsely persuaded her that her husband is infatuated with another woman. By a superhuman effort, Dan reaches the steamer just in time to save his wife using a breeches buoy from the swaying rigging of the wreck while Tom perishes in the raging waters.

== Cast ==
- Evelyn Brent as Ellen Craig
- Monte Blue as Captain Dan Stover
- Joan Lowell as Madge Barlow
- Charles K. Gerrard as Tom Hayden (credited as Charles Gerrard)
- Ralph Faulkner as Jack Ellis
- Ethel Wales as Penny Wise
- Andrew Waldron as Bill Keenan
- Tom Kennedy as Captain Lindstrom
- Hazel Williams in a bit part

== Preservation ==
With no prints of Loving Lies located in any film archives, it is a lost film.
