= Joan Lowell =

American movie actress (1902–1967)

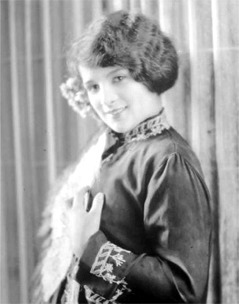
- Lowell in 1920
- Born: Helen Wagner; November 23, 1902; Berkeley, California, United States
- Died: November 7, 1967 (aged 64); Brasília, Distrito Federal, Brazil
- Occupations: Film actress, author, film director
- Years active: 1920–1934
- Spouse(s): Thompson Buchanan (1927–1930, divorced) Leek Bowen (m. 1936)

Joan Lowell (born Helen Wagner; November 23, 1902 – November 7, 1967) was an American actress of the silent film era. Lowell published a sensational autobiography, Cradle of the Deep, in 1929, which turned out to be fictionalized.

== Early life ==
According to Cradle of the Deep, Lowell's mother was from Boston's Lowell family, and her father was the son of a landowner from Montenegro and a Turkish woman. Lowell feared that her father, Captain Nicholas Wagner (Preacher Nick), had died on December 24, 1924. Newspapers reported that his ship, the Oceanic Vance, sank off the coast of Mexico. Two weeks overdue in Los Angeles, California, the schooner was sighted in January 1925, fifteen miles (24 km) northwest of San Diego. The Oceanic Vance had lost her convoy, the schooner Westerner, on Christmas Eve, 1924.

Actually, Joan Lowell was born in Berkeley, California. She studied in the Garfield Junior High School in Berkeley. She attended the Munson School for Private Secretaries in San Francisco, where she obtained stenographer's skills.

Her father was a ship captain who sailed on the Minnie A. Caine and reportedly took his wife and daughter, then thirteen, for a trip with him.

She changed her name from Helen Wagner after taking acting lessons to help her get into the movie industry.

== Movie actress ==
Joan Lowell in Adventure Girl (1934)

Lowell received her dramatic training from Gwendolen Logan Seiler and became an extra at Goldwyn Pictures at the age of 17. She played bit parts in motion pictures also as an extra. One of her first efforts was the role of Madge Barlow in the movie Loving Lies (1924). She was featured with Monte Blue in Cap'n Dan and in the Thompson Buchanan theater production of The Cub (1915).

After completing a leading part in Branded a Thief (1924), about Mexican frontier life, Lowell was chosen as the "Queen of the Fourth of July" for 1924 in Tijuana, Mexico. She was selected by Senor De Los Rios, a noted bullfighter from Spain.

Her last screen role was in Adventure Girl (1934), a film directed by Herman C. Raymaker and loosely based on her fictionalized autobiography. In 1935, Lowell sued Van Beuren Studios and Amedee J. Van Beuren for an accounting of the profits. Van Beuren promptly made a counterclaim for $300,000, damages allegedly sustained because of Lowell's "inexpert" performance in the picture.

== Autobiographer ==
In 1929, Joan Lowell wrote an autobiography, Cradle of the Deep, published by Simon & Schuster, in which she claimed that her seafaring father took her aboard his ship, the Minnie A. Caine, at the age of three months when she was suffering from malnutrition and nursed her back to health. She also claimed that she lived on the ship, with its all-male crew, until she was 17, during which time she became skilled in the art of seamanship and once harpooned a whale by herself. She claimed that the ship ultimately burned and sank off Australia, and that she swam three miles to safety with a family of kittens clinging by their claws to her back. In fact, the autobiography was a fabrication; Lowell had been on the ship, which remained safely in California, for only 15 months. The book was a sensational best seller until it was exposed as pure invention.

Cradle of the Deep was later parodied by Corey Ford in his book Salt Water Taffy, in which Lowell abandons the sinking ship (which had previously sunk several times before, "very badly") and swims to safety with her manuscript.

Later in 1929, Lowell's book about growing up at sea was exposed as a fabrication when her former neighbors in Berkeley were interviewed by the San Francisco Chronicle. Simon & Schuster had to reclassify her book as fiction and offer a refund for returns. Despite all newspaper revelations and ensuing controversy, the book continued to sell well.

In an interview, Lowell commented on the fabrication charges as follows: "Eighty per cent of it was true and the rest I colored up. I made some changes to protect people and the rest to make it better reading. That's an author's privilege."

== Author and reporter ==
She married playwright Thompson Buchanan on October 16, 1927. The couple resided on a 170-acre (0.69 km^{2}) farm three miles (4.8 km) from New Hope, Pennsylvania. They separated in October 1929. Lowell continued to live in the smaller of two old stone houses on the property. She named the home Joan's Ark. Lowell liked the country, her horses, and books, while Buchanan preferred city life.

Lowell worked as a newspaper reporter in Boston in the early 1930s. She was assaulted by booking agent Morris Levine, who was sentenced in January 1932 to fourteen months in prison.

Lowell worked for WOR (AM) radio station in New York City in 1934.

== Move to Brazil ==
Joan Lowell married a sea captain, Leek Bowen, in 1936. They moved to the countryside of Brazil to establish a coffee plantation. Together they owned a farm called "The Anchorage" in the city of Anápolis, a Brazilian municipality of the state of Goiás. Working as a real estate agent, she also sold land to Hollywood actors and actresses such as Janet Gaynor and Mary Martin in Anápolis. She was called "Dona Joana" by the locals and after a long time in Anápolis she made a remarkable trip, crossing the national road "Belém–Brasília" from south to north, driving a Volkswagen. That great adventure was reported in a national magazine during the 1960s. She chronicled their adventures in a book, Promised Land (1952).

Joan Lowell died in Brasília, Brazil, in 1967.

The local Jan Magalinski Institute preserves her archives and researches her history at Anápolis.
