= Adventure Girl =

1934 American adventure documentary directed by Herman C. Raymaker

- Title card from the film
- Directed by: Herman C. Raymaker
- Written by: Ferrin Frazier
- Based on: The Cradle of the Deep by Joan Lowell
- Produced by: Amadee J. Van Beuren
- Starring: Joan Lowell
- Narrated by: Joan Lowell
- Cinematography: Harry Squire
- Edited by: Sam B. Jacobson
- Music by: Winston Sharples
- Production company: Van Beuren Studios
- Distributed by: RKO Radio Pictures
- Release date: August 17, 1934
- Running time: 76 minutes
- Country: United States
- Language: English

Adventure Girl is a 1934 American adventure film starring and narrated by Joan Lowell. Directed by Herman C. Raymaker in pseudo-documentary fashion, it is based on a screenplay by Ferrin Frazier, who adapted Lowell's supposed autobiography, The Cradle of the Deep, later revealed to be a work of complete fiction.

== Plot ==
Young, single Joan Lowell leaves for a sea adventure, destination unknown, with her father, Nicholas Wagner, as the captain, and two additional crew, William Sawyer and Otto Siegler. During their voyage their ship is damaged in a hurricane. Coming upon the wrecks of other ships they find a mast that they can use to replace their broken one. As the two crewmembers begin salvaging the mast, Lowell and Wagner explore other wrecks, where Lowell comes upon an old map which supposedly reveals a precious emerald hidden in Guatemalan jungle ruins.

Repairs complete, they continue their journey, but desperately need to find a water supply to replenish their drinking water, which was lost during the hurricane. Lowell and Sawyer row a dinghy to a tiny nearby island, where they meet a solitary native, who gives them both coconuts and fresh water.

They continue on, fortuitously managing to find a village on the mainland, which Lowell realizes is the one on her map.

She begins trading with the locals, and convinces the local headman, Manola, to take her to meet the female leader of his tribe, Maya, who is the only one that can grant her permission to continue on to the interior.

Maya does so, and agrees to accompany the party as their guide to the lost city. They have the natives construct a special canoe for them, and mount an outboard motor they had brought along on it. Secretly Manola trails them up river, not trusting Lowell at all, who has lied to everyone and seeks to break tribal taboos the natives believe will bring them misfortune in her hidden pursuit of booty.

Lowell begins to search for the emerald. When Manola realizes Lowell's intention, he and his men take her prisoner, intending to burn her alive. Sawyer rescues her, and the two escape back to their dingy. As they are pursued by the native villagers in their canoes, Sawyer dumps gasoline into the waters behind them and sets it afire. The two would-be treasure thieves return successfully to their boat.

== Cast ==
- Joan Lowell as herself
- Captain Nicholas Wagner as himself
- William Sawyer as himself
- Otto Siegler as himself

== Production ==
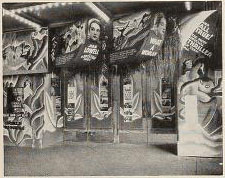
Jungle motif decorations at the Rialto Theater in New York City

The screenplay was loosely framed around a swashbuckling life described by Lowell in her 1929 book, Cradle of the Deep, which at the time of its publication was advertised as an autobiography. It was chosen by the Book of the Month Club, and became a best-seller in 1929. However, within a month of publication the book was exposed as a work of complete fiction.

The film was released and promoted as a documentary, however, shortly afterwards it was revealed to be a work of complete fiction.

The film was shot on location in Guatemala. In July 1934, it was reported that production had completed, with filming done in Central America. The film began previews in early August, with one of these previews occurring aboard the S.S. Columbia on August 1, 1934.

Shot in black and white, the climax of the film, the fire scene, was hand colored by Gustav Brock.

The film opened on August 17, 1934, at the Rialto Theater in New York City. Several marketing schemes were put in place to coincide with the film's opening, including a newspaper essay contest with the winner receiving a free trip to Haiti, fashion tie-ins featuring Joan Lowell, and theater lobbies decorated in jungle motifs.

In 1935, Lowell sued Van Beuren Studios and Amedee J. Van Beuren for an accounting of the profits. Van Beuren promptly made a counter claim for $300,000 damages allegedly sustained because of Lowell's "inexpert" performance in the picture.

== Reception ==
Contemporary reviews were mixed: Motion Picture Daily gave the film a good review as outdoor adventure, singling out the sea photography, and the colorization sequence by Brock. The Brooklyn Daily Eagle gave the film a mostly negative review, mostly due to the amateur nature of the actors, but they did compliment the photography, calling it "excellent", but a wasted effort. The Hollywood Reporter felt that it was a good family adventure film. The New York Daily News complimented Brock's coloring of the fire scene, and praised the cinematography in general. the New York Daily Mirror also praised the photography, while the New York World-Telegram called the film "as amusing and exciting an hour as you can imagine in the cinema." The Film Daily called it an "Unusual adventure film with good exploitation values." They also praised Lowell's acting as well as the photography.

== See also ==
- List of RKO Pictures films
