= Ed Monk =

Shipwright and naval architect (1894–1973)

George Edwin William Monk (a.k.a. Ed Monk, Sr.) (Jan 1, 1894 - Port Blakely, Washington, to Jan 21, 1973) was a shipwright and naval architect in the Pacific Northwest of the United States. He was active from 1914 to 1973. He designed pleasure and commercial vessels, both power and sail.

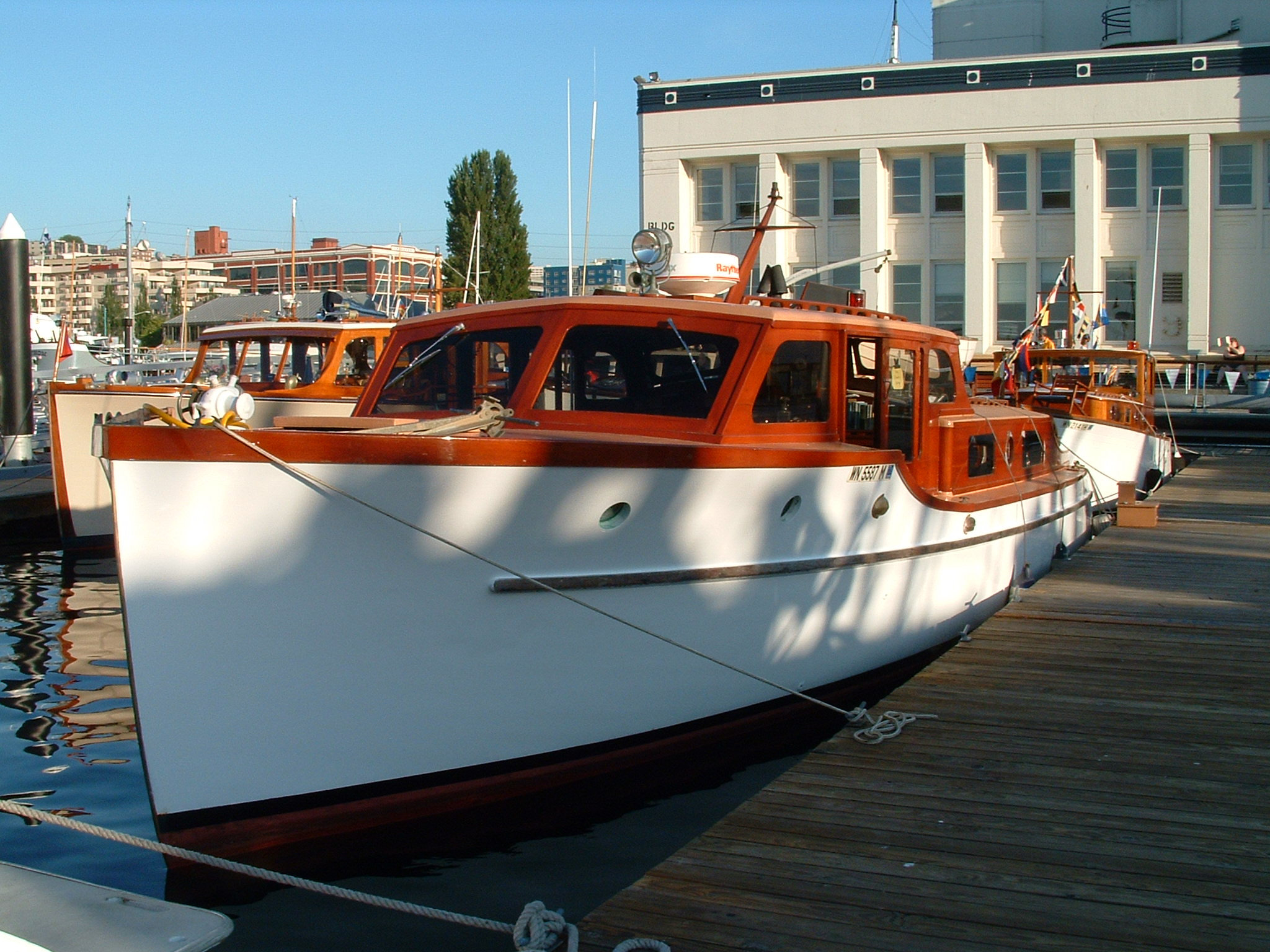
MV Savona, a 40' bridge-deck cruiser, moored at South Lake Union, Seattle, WA, an example of an Ed Monk, Sr., boat design, from 1942.

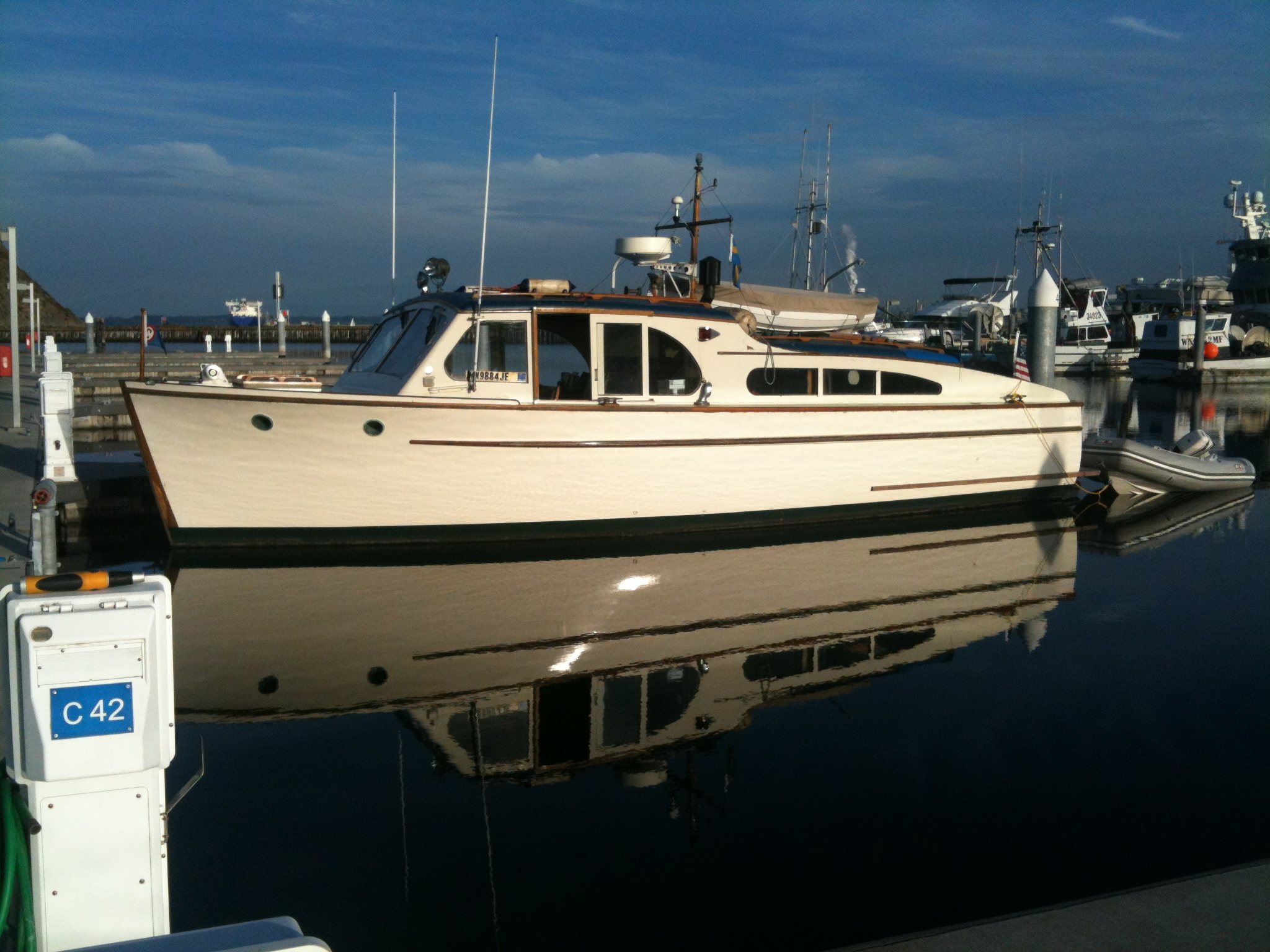
MV King Gustaf, a 36' bridge-deck cruiser, moored at Cap Sante Marina, Anacortes, WA, an example of an Ed Monk, Sr., boat design, from 1952.

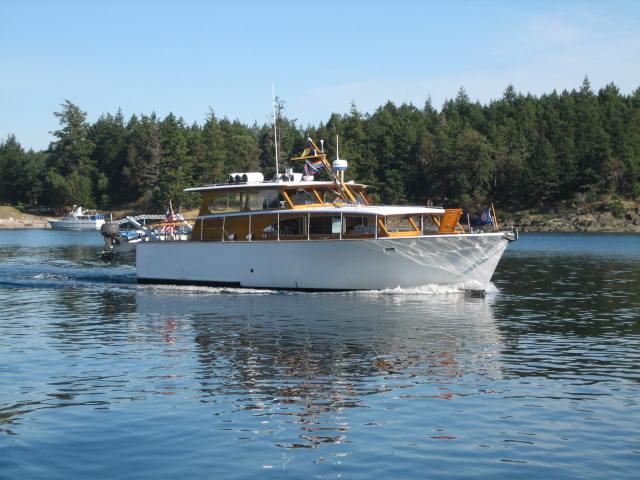
MV Thunderbird, 40', an example of an Ed Monk, Sr., boat design, from 1959.

== Shipwright, 1914 to 1925 ==
Ed Monk, Sr., began his boat building career in 1914 as an apprentice working on Robert Moran's schooner San Juan, under construction on Orcas Island. In 1915, Monk worked with his father again in St. Helens, OR, building The City of Portland, "one of the largest wooden freighters ever built." He continued to work for his father at Meacham and Babcock, a boatyard started in Seattle, WA, during World War I to build twelve wooden freighters for the US Government. During this time, he became more interested in designing boats and began studying toward that end. Meacham and Babcock closed in 1919. Monk continued to work at various boatyards in Seattle and eventually found his way to the Blanchard Boat Co. in 1925. He was hired as a shipwright, but soon began to design small boats. His first large cruiser design, the 62 foot motor yacht Silver King, was built there in 1925

== Naval architect, 1925 to 1973 ==
At Blanchard Boat Co., Monk got to know the naval architect L. E. "Ted" Geary and in 1926, Geary hired Monk as a draftsman. In 1930, Monk followed Geary to Long Beach, CA. In 1933, Monk quit working directly for Geary and moved back to Washington state. Monk maintained his association with Geary as his local representative.

Monk began his independent career as a naval architect by designing and building his "Plan No. 1," the 50 ft. bridge-deck cruiser Nan, which became his home for seven years, moored at the Seattle Yacht Club, and was briefly his office. His designs were built by many of the Pacific Northwest builders like Blanchard Boat Co., Grandy Boat Co., Jensen Motor Boat, Chambers and Franck, Forder Boatworks, McQueen Boat Works, and Tollycraft among others.

Ed Monk, Sr., wrote two books on boat building:

1. Monk, Edwin, Small Boat Building, 1934, revised 1947, published by Charles Scribner's Sons, New York
2. Monk, Edwin, Modern Boat Building, 1939, revised 1949 and 1973, published by Charles Scribner's Sons, New York

Monk designed commercial vessels which included tugs and cargo carriers. He also designed the "Super Shrimp Trapper (SST)" Mimi for Ivar Haglund, launched in 1967.

Monk continued to design boats up until his death in 1973 at the age of 79. He had "produced more than 3,000 boat designs ranging from 6 foot dinghies to yachts and workboats in the 150 foot range."

Ed Monk, Sr., designed and built both sailboats & powerboats:

Sailing Yachts

1. Aries, 50 feet, launched 1941
2. Mariner III, 42 feet, launched 1941
3. Symra, 43 feet, launched 1941
4. Cumulus, 26 feet, launched 1947
5. Bendora, launched 1948
6. Halcyon II, launched 1948
7. Netha, 45 feet, launched 1936
8. Madwenowe, launched 1967
9. Mikay IV, 46 feet, launched 1959
10. Moonraker, 50 feet, launched 1962
11. Sea Witch, 29 feet, launched 1939
12. Moonsail, 32 feet, launched 1946

Motor Yachts

1. Ann Saunders, 32 feet, launched 1926
2. Nan, 50 feet, launched 1934
3. Port Madison Gal, 24 feet, launched c. 1940
4. Western Maid I, 40 feet, launched 1946
5. Western Maid II, 42 feet, launched 1947
6. Duffy, 35 feet, launched 1950
7. Alerion, 42 feet, launched c. 1952
8. Whim, 37 feet, launched c. 1957
9. Ailsa Craig, 40 feet, launched c. 1949
10. Tatoosh, 40 feet, launched 1959
11. Nika Sia, 46 feet, launched 1965
12. Tryphena, 50 feet, launched 1970
