= Amedee J. Van Beuren =

American film producer (1879–1938)

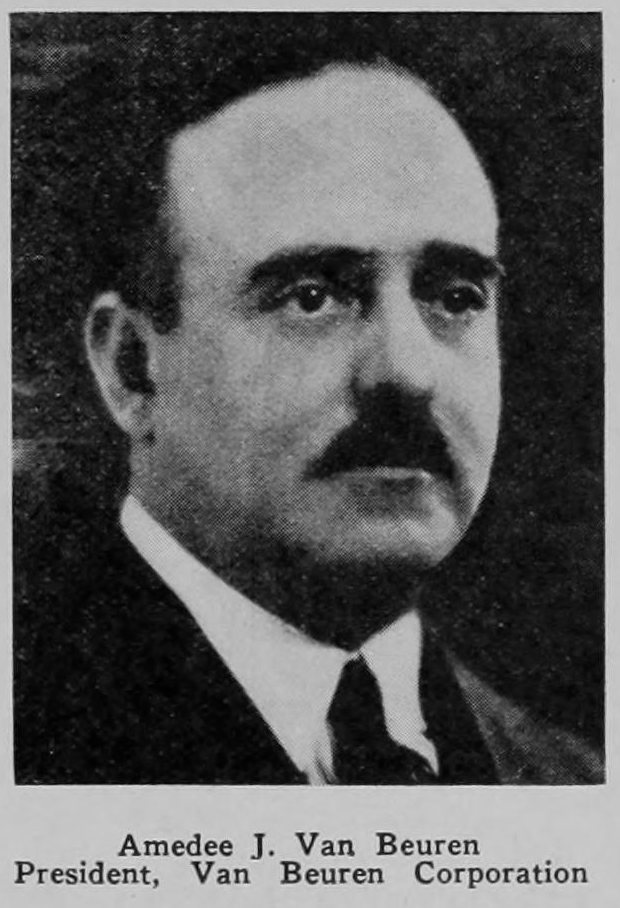
- Amedee J. Van Beuren
- Born: Amedee Vignot; July 10, 1879; New York, US
- Died: November 12, 1938 (aged 59); Carmel, New York, US
- Occupation: Film producer
- Known for: Cartoons and Frank Buck's first three films
- Spouse(s): Blanche van Beuren (divorced 1925); Ethel V. Anderson (1927-1936, divorced)

Amedee J. Van Beuren (July 10, 1879 – November 12, 1938) was an American film producer. He is best known for producing Frank Buck's first three films, as well as many cartoons and short films. He also prepared Charlie Chaplin's celebrated comedies of 1916-17 for sound-film audiences; the "Chaplin Van Beurens" are still in circulation today.

== Early years ==
Amedee ("Andy") Van Beuren was born Amedee Vignot in New York, the son of Alfred Vignot, who died in 1894, and Marietta Ferguson. Subsequently, Marietta married Alfred Van Beuren on January 13, 1898, when Amadee was 9 years old, and he took on his stepfather's surname. Alfred Van Beuren was head of the Van Beuren advertising company, which became a part of the General Outdoor Advertising Company. Amedee was educated at public and private schools and a business college. He worked in the livery business, groceries, and then as a salesman.

Andy Van Beuren established the Van Beuren Billposting Company as a means of outdoor promotions. He expanded his interest in outdoor advertising by operating a number of outdoor amusements, including skating rinks, tennis courts, open-air theaters, and outdoor restaurants.

== Van Beuren Productions ==
He began motion picture production in 1918, when he returned the popular comedians Mr. and Mrs. Sidney Drew to the screen. By 1920 his Timely Films, Inc. company was producing a series of live-action magazine films called Topics of the Day, released through Pathé. At the same time he was producing two-reel comedies starring stage actor Ernest Truex, released by Paramount Pictures.

One of Andy Van Beuren's most successful projects was a series of cartoons. The earliest ones were produced by pioneer animator Paul Terry; Van Beuren bought into Terry's studio in 1928. Van Beuren wanted to make cartoons in the then-new sound format but Terry, already accustomed to silent-film economics, disagreed. Van Beuren broke away from Terry and formed his own company, Van Beuren Studios, releasing through Pathé.

Pathé became part of RKO Radio Pictures, and Van Beuren continued this association. In 1931 and 1932 big-game hunter Frank Buck made a series of 10-minute shorts for Van Beuren, but when RKO executives saw them in a projection room, they saw great potential in assembling them as a feature film, which became the phenomenally successful Bring 'Em Back Alive (1932). Two sequels followed: Wild Cargo (1934), and Fang and Claw (1935).

== Lowell's lawsuit against Van Beuren ==
Joan Lowell in Adventure Girl (1934)

As an adjunct to the Frank Buck successes, Van Beuren agreed to produce a film version of Joan Lowell's book "Cradle of the Deep", featuring Lowell as a daring adventurer. Lowell adapted her book for the screen, and the film was titled Adventure Girl (1934). It failed to achieve the same artistic and boxoffice success. In 1935 Lowell filed a lawsuit against Amedee Van Beuren and Van Beuren Studios, alleging that she had not received 15 per cent of the earnings guaranteed her, and demanding an accounting of the profits from Adventure Girl. Van Beuren replied that they lost $300,000 on the picture, and promptly made a counterclaim for $300,000 damages alleged to have been sustained because of Lowell's inexpert performance in the picture. Van Beuren asserted that Lowell "carelessly, negligently, inefficiently, inexpertly, and improperly acted and performed in the motion picture produced as to seriously impair and damage the reputation, fame, and business capacity of the defendant."

== The "Chaplin Van Beurens" ==
Van Beuren is known today for returning Charlie Chaplin's short comedies to the screen in the early 1930s. Author Michael J. Hayde has discovered how this came about: Van Beuren had already planned his Frank Buck films as a series of short subjects, but RKO did away with that plan, leaving a void in Van Beuren's release schedule. Looking urgently for a ready-made series he could offer theaters, he hit upon acquiring the famous Chaplin shorts produced by Mutual Film in 1916-17. These perennial favorites had been issued again and again throughout the silent-film era, but had been retired when sound came in. Van Beuren bought the 12 Chaplin shorts for $10,000 each, and had his cartoon staff equip them with new music and sound effects. Radio and recording conductor Gene Rodemich and young jazz-band pianist Winston Sharples supervised the music for the Chaplin comedies. These first played in theaters from 1932 to 1934, and were revived in 1941 after Van Beuren's death.

== Last cartoons ==
When full-color Technicolor became available to cartoon producers, Van Beuren hired former Walt Disney supervisor Burt Gillett to oversee the new Rainbow Parade series for RKO release. The cartoons were handsomely produced and the color was superior to most cartoons on the market, but when RKO announced that it had signed Walt Disney himself, RKO no longer needed Van Beuren. Van Beuren saw no future in competing and abandoned the series.

== Personal life ==
Van Beuren was president of the Colorado Springs Theatre Corporation and the Kernab Corporation. He was a life member of the Society of The Friendly Sons of St. Patrick.

== Final years ==
In July 1938, Van Beuren had a stroke but gradually recovered, although he was confined to his home. He died of a heart attack, age 59 on November 12, 1938, at his 63-acre (250,000 m^{2}) country estate, Dreamwold, in Carmel, New York.
