= Vera Pearce =

Australian actress (1895–1966)

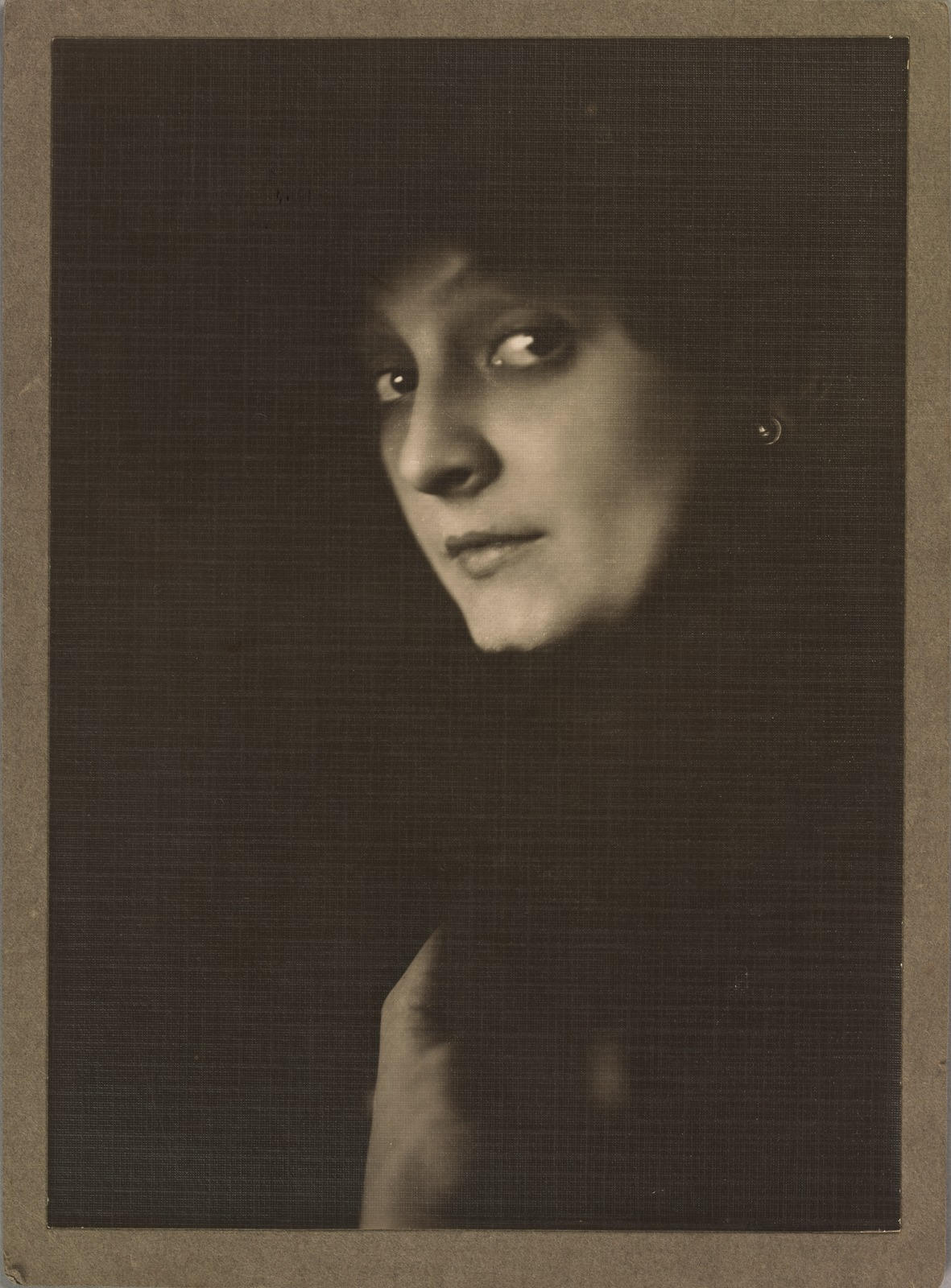
- Portrait by May and Mina Moore
- Born: Annie Vera Pearce; 27 May 1895; Broken Hill, New South Wales, Australia
- Died: 18 January 1966 (aged 70); Lambeth, London, England
- Occupation: Actress
- Years active: c. 1900–1961
- Relatives: Harold Holt (nephew)

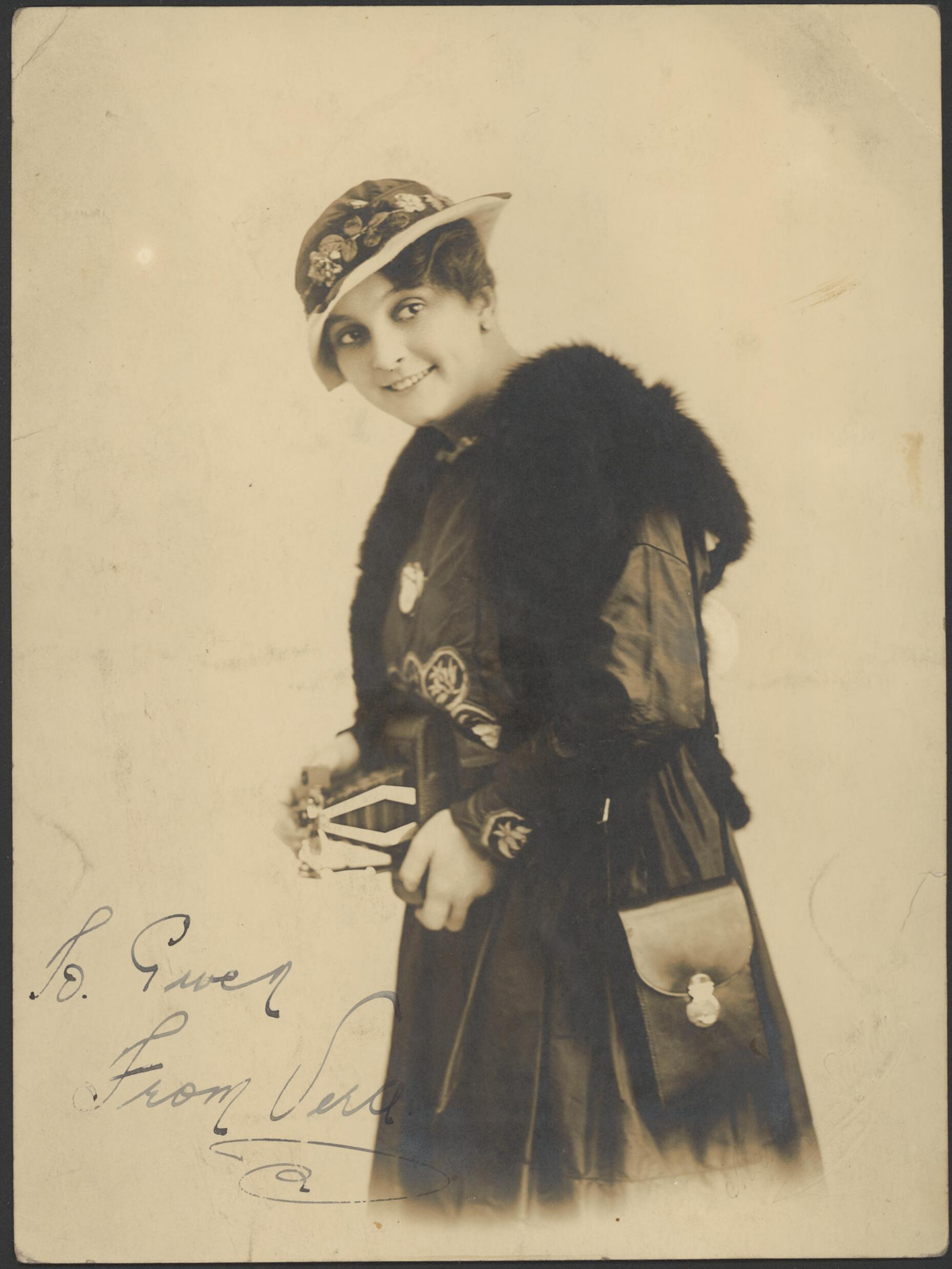
Pearce in 1919

Annie Vera Pearce (27 May 1895 – 18 January 1966) was an Australian stage and film actress. Her lengthy career was carried out in both her home country and in England.

== Biography ==
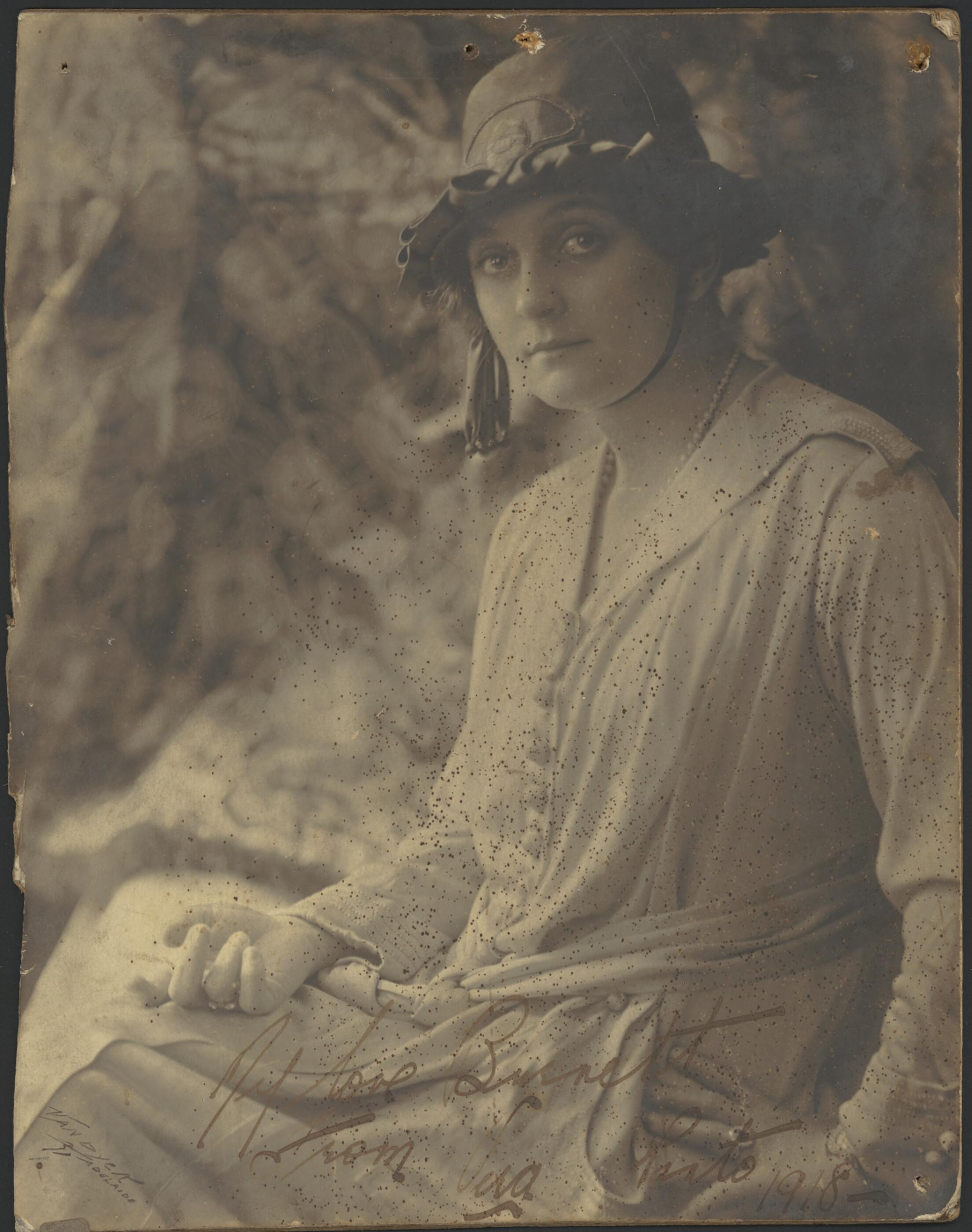
Pearce in 1918

Born in Broken Hill (New South Wales), Pearce spent much of her youth in Adelaide, and made her stage debut there at age five with the World's Entertainers She went on to train as a juvenile performer in pantomimes and musical comedies produced by J. C. Williamson Ltd, and in 1910 scored much acclaim for her role in the Firm's hit production Our Miss Gibbs (1910).

After making her film debut in The Shepherd of the Southern Cross (1914), Pearce went to England with the aim of carving out a career there but was induced to return to Australia shortly afterwards by Hugh D. McIntosh, General Manager of Harry Rickards Tivoli Theatres Ltd.

Pearce made her return to the Australian stage in November 1914 as one of the stars of the Tivoli Follies revue, and remained with the show throughout its two and a half year tour around the country. Among the other productions she appeared in over the next seven years were The Beauty Shop (1917), My Lady Frayle (1919), The Officers' Mess (1919), His Little Widows (1920) and Chu Chin Chow (1920), in which she played Zahrat-al-Kulub opposite Charles H. Workman (as Ali Baba).

Pearce moved to the UK in 1922, with one of her earliest shows being Love's Awakening. She went on to work consistently on the London stage in musicals and pantomimes up until her death. In 1954 she appeared with Ralph Lynn and Robertson Hare in the West End farce The Party Spirit. Her last notable appearance, though, was in a 1957 New York City production of Georges Feydeau's farce Hotel Paradise (aka L'Hôtel du libre échange). She also appeared in at least 16 films between 1931 and 1966.

== Personal life ==
Pearce was in a long-term relationship with a married man, Hugh D. McIntosh. Her nephew Harold Holt became Prime Minister of Australia eight days after Pearce's death.

== Historical note ==
Pearce won two beauty contests in Australia. The first was promoted by West's Pictures in Sydney in 1911. The second event, the 1916 White City Beauty Competition, created controversy when it became known that the judges were linked to the vaudeville industry. The revelation also led to a number of 100-1 bets being placed by well-known "sporting gentlemen" for Pearce to win. When she was announced the winner the huge audience reportedly went "frigidly silent [being] too astounded to take the result seriously"

== Filmography ==
Pearce towards the end of her career

Year	Title	Role	Notes
1914	The Shepherd of the Southern Cross	Lady Helen Reynolds	
1916	The Martyrdom of Nurse Cavell		Short
1933	Yes, Mr. Brown	Franzi	
1933	That's a Good Girl	Suny Berata	
1933	Just My Luck	Lady Croft	
1935	So You Won't Talk	Edith	
1935	Heat Wave	Gloria Spania	
1935	Royal Cavalcade		
1936	Southern Roses	Carrie, the Cannon-Ball Queen	
1937	Please Teacher	Petunia Trundle	
1938	What a Man!	Emily Pennyfeather	
1939	Yes, Madam?	Pansy Beresford	
1947	Nicholas Nickleby	Mrs. Crummles	
1951	One Wild Oat	Mrs. Gilbey	
1954	The Men of Sherwood Forest	Elvira	
1959	The Night We Dropped a Clanger	Madame Grilby	
1961	The Night We Got the Bird	Aunt	
1961	Nothing Barred	Lady Millicent	(final film role)
