= Bertha Belmore =

British actress (1882–1953)

- Bertha Belmore
- Born: Bertha Cousins; 22 December 1882; Manchester, Lancashire, UK
- Died: 14 December 1953 (aged 70); Barcelona, Catalonia, Spain
- Occupations: Stage and screen actress
- Years active: 1890–1951
- Spouse: Herbert Belmore

Bertha Belmore (22 December 1882 – 14 December 1953) was an English stage and film actress.

Part of the Belmore family of British actors through her marriage to actor Herbert Belmore, she began her career as a child actress in British pantomimes and music hall variety acts.

As a young adult she was one of the Belmore Sisters in variety entertainment before beginning a more serious acting career performing in classic plays by William Shakespeare with Ben Greet's Pastoral Players in a 1911 tour of the United States.

She made her Broadway debut as Portia in Shakespeare's Julius Caesar in 1912. She returned to Broadway numerous times in mainly comedic character roles over the next 40 years, notably creating parts in the original Broadway productions of Lorenz Hart and Richard Rodgers's By Jupiter (1942) and Anita Loos's Gigi (1951).

She worked in several productions mounted by Florenz Ziegfeld Jr., including appearing in the Ziegfeld Follies of 1925 with W.C. Fields and Will Rogers, and starring as Parthy Ann Hawks in the 1929 Australian tour and 1932 Broadway revival of Jerome Kern and Oscar Hammerstein II's Show Boat.

In more serious work, Belmore portrayed the nurse in the United States premiere of Jean Anouilh's Antigone (1946), and starred as Ftatateeta in the 1949 revival of George Bernard Shaw's Caesar and Cleopatra. In the latter part of her career she made numerous appearances on American television from 1948 to 1953. Also active as an actress in Great Britain, she worked frequently as a character actress in British cinema from 1933 to 1940 in addition to appearing on the British stage.

== Early life and career: 1890-1919 ==
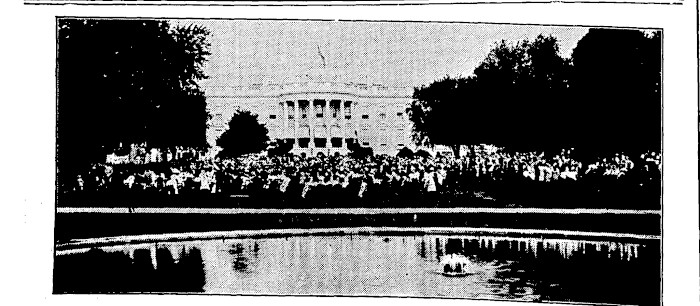
Ben Greet's Pastoral Players at the White House in 1911

Born Bertha Cousins in Manchester, Belmore began her career as a child actress in 1890; making her professional debut at eight years old in a pantomime production of Robinson Crusoe at the Prince's Theatre, Manchester. As a child actress she performed regularly in British music halls and vaudeville entertainment in Continental Europe as a member of several variety acts; including the Tiller Girls, Harwood's "The Six Sunbeams" and Harwood's "Juveniles". She was also frequently seen as Principal Boy in pantomimes in British provincial theatres. As a young adult she spent seven years performing as one of the Belmore Sisters, a variety act organized by the Belmore family of actors in which her comedic and singing talent were featured. She married Herbert "Bertie" Belmore, one of the Belmore acting clan, and thereafter performed under the name Bertha Belmore.

In 1911 Belmore went to the United States as a member of Ben Greet's Pastoral Players, touring the east coast of America in performances of plays by William Shakespeare. One of the stops for the company was the White House. In 1912 she made her Broadway debut at the Lyric Theatre as Portia in Shakespeare's Julius Caesar with William Faversham as Marc Antony and Fuller Mellish in the title role. In 1919 she created the role Mrs. Tom Collins in the world premiere of Harry L. Cort & George E. Stoddard's musical Just A Minute at the Academy of Music in Baltimore which was produced by impresario John Cort.

== Later life and career: 1920-1953 ==
In 1920 Belmore made her debut in London's West End at the Empire Theatre as Helen Cheston in Harry Tierney's Irene; a hit production which ran for 399 performances. She then returned to the United States, appearing in the 1921 musical Angel Face which was staged by George Lederer for performances in Los Angeles and San Francisco with a cast that included Marguerite Zender, Nat Carr, and Norah Kelly. She returned to Broadway in 1923 in Thompson Buchanan's The Sporting Thing To Do at the Ritz Theatre. She remained active on Broadway for the next couple of years, appearing as Henriette Deschamps in Guy Bolton's Grounds For Divorce (1924-1925) and the Ziegfeld Follies of 1925 with W. C. Fields and Will Rogers. By 1924 she and Herbert had relocated to the United States, maintaining a home in Beechhurst, Long Island. In 1927 the couple toured Australia in leading roles in plays produced by J. C. Williamson.

One of the parts she portrayed there was Ethel in Norma Mitchell and Russell Medcraft's Cradle Snatchers; a role which she repeated at the Baltimore Auditorium in 1928 and the Coliseum Theatre in 1931. In 1929 she returned to Australia to star as Parthy Ann Hawks in the Australian premiere of Jerome Kern and Oscar Hammerstein II's Show Boat.

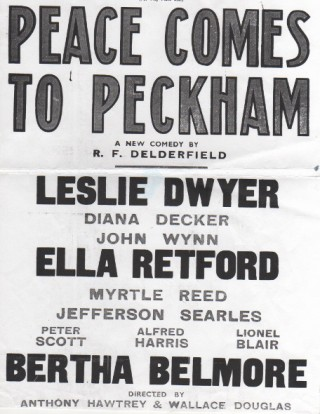
Peace Comes to Peckham in 1947

From this point on Belmore maintained an active theatre career on both sides of the Atlantic. In the United States her notable stage achievements included the role of Pomposia in the original Broadway production of Lorenz Hart and Richard Rodgers's By Jupiter at the Shubert Theatre in 1942–1943, and the role of the nurse in the American premiere of Antigone at the National Theatre in Washington, D.C., in 1946. Her other Broadway appearances included Terence De Marney's and Percy Robinson's The Whispering Gallery (1929, Lady Elliot), Julian F. Thompson's The Warrior's Husband (1932, Forrest Theatre, as Caustica), Jerome Kern and Oscar Hammerstein II's Show Boat (1932, Casino Theatre, Parthy Ann Hawks), Arthur Schwartz's Virginia (1937, Center Theatre, as Minnie Fortesque), Elmer Harris's Johnny Belinda (1940-1941, Mrs. McKee), Lesley Storm's Heart of a City (1942, Mrs. Good), Gypsy Rose Lee's The Naked Genius (1943, Lollie Adams), Fritz Kreisler Rhapsody (1944, Frau Tina Hugenhaugen), Terence Rattigan's Harlequinade (1949, Dame Maud Gosport), and George Bernard Shaw's Caesar and Cleopatra (1949-1950, Ftatateeta). Her final Broadway appearance was as Sidonie in the original production of Anita Loos's Gigi in 1951–1952 with Audrey Hepburn.

In the United Kingdom, Belmore's notable stage appearances included Mrs Trellis in Guy Bolton's Give Me A Ring (1935, Hippodrome, London); Frau Lucher in Robert E. Sherwood's Reunion in Vienna (1934, Lyric Theatre, London); Emily Peabody in Yes, Madam? (1934, Manchester Opera House); Miss Pink in R. P. Weston's Please Teacher! (1935, Hippodrome, London); Emmeline Ray in K. R. G. Browne, Bert Lee and Desmond Carter's Big Business (1937, Hippodrome, London); Mrs. Simmons in Geoffrey Kerr's Oh! You Letty (1937 – 1938, Palace Theatre, London); Guy Bolton's Bobby Get Your Gun (1938 – 1939, Adelphi Theatre); Margot Neville and Gerald Kirby's Giving the Bride Away (1939, Manchester Opera House); Nurse McClintock in Guy Bolton's Nap Hand (1940, Aldwych Theatre); Nurse Ironside in R. F. Delderfield's Peace Comes To Peckham (1947, Princes Theatre, London); and Emily Bompard in Austin Melford's Blue For A Boy (1950, Her Majesty's Theatre). She was active as a character actress in British cinema from 1933 to 1940; appearing mainly in comedies. From 1948 to 1953 she made several appearances on American television, including The Philco Television Playhouse (1948-1950), The Chevrolet Tele-Theatre (1949), The Trap (1950), The Web (1951), Martin Kane (1951), The Ford Theatre Hour (1951), Studio One in Hollywood (1951), and The Goldbergs (1953).

Having never retired, Belmore died at the age of 70 from injuries sustained from a fall at a hospital in Barcelona, Catalonia, Spain in 1953. Her husband, Herbert Belmore, had died a year earlier.

== Selected filmography ==
- Happy (1933)
- Going Gay (1933)
- Keep It Quiet (1934)
- Over the Garden Wall (1934)
- Give Her a Ring (1934)
- Blossom Time (1934)
- Are You a Mason? (1934)
- Royal Cavalcade (1935)
- Be Careful, Mr. Smith (1935)
- So You Won't Talk (1935)
- In the Soup (1936)
- Broken Blossoms (1936)
- Over She Goes (1938)
- Convict 99 (1938)
- Let's Make a Night of It (1938)
- Queer Cargo (1938)
- Hold My Hand (1938)
- Weddings Are Wonderful (1938)
- She Couldn't Say No (1939)
- Yes, Madam? (1939)
- Discoveries (1939)
- The Midas Touch (1940)
