= The Sporting Thing To Do =

The Sporting Thing To Do is a play by Thompson Buchanan. The play premiered at the Philharmonic Auditorium in Los Angeles, California on September 4, 1922. Produced by Oliver Morosco and directed by Fred J. Butler, the original cast included Enid Bennett, Edith Lyle, Warner Baxter, Adele Belgarde, Boyd Irwin, Roscoe Karns, Henry Hail, Innis Shearer, Harry Manners, Thomas Galloway, and Chas A. Stevenson. After Morosco and Buchanan reworked the play, the work premiered on Broadway at the Ritz Theatre on February 19, 1923. Co-directed by Morosco and Clifford Brooke, the cast included James K. Applebee as Rev. Dr. Clegg, Bertha Belmore as Mrs. Suzanne Clegg, William Boyd as Jack Thornton, Walker Dennett as Colonel Thornton, Mary Fisher as Miss Simpson, Robert Hudson as Thomas Kennedy, Clara Joel as Eleanor Ainsworth, Della Johnson as Mandy, Jack Raffael as Judge McLean, H. Reeves Smith as Jim Loundsbury, Emily Stevens as Jean Thornton, and Ethel Winthrop as Mrs. Thornton. In closed in March 1943 after 40 performances.
