= So You Won't Talk (1935 film) =

1935 film by William Beaudine

So You Won't Talk!
- William Beaudine (right) directing Monty Banks and Ralph Ince, on the set of the film
- Directed by: William Beaudine
- Produced by: Irving Asher
- Starring: Monty Banks; Vera Pearce; Bertha Belmore
- Cinematography: Basil Emmott
- Edited by: A. Bates
- Production company: Warner Brothers First National Productions
- Release date: 1935
- Running time: 84 minutes
- Country: United Kingdom
- Language: English

So You Won't Talk is a 1935 British comedy film directed by William Beaudine and starring Monty Banks, Vera Pearce and Bertha Belmore. It was written by Frank Launder, Russell Medcraft and Tom Geraghty. The screenplay concerns the owner of a restaurant, who is left a large inheritance.

== Plot ==
The owner of a small Italian restaurant in central London is left a million pound inheritance, the only stipulation to the will being that he cannot speak or write anything for a period of one month.

== Cast ==
- Monty Banks as Tony
- Vera Pearce as Edith
- Bertha Belmore as Harriet
- Enid Stamp-Taylor as Pauline
- Muriel Angelus as Katrina
- Ralph Ince as Ralph Younger
- Claude Dampier as Wilbur Whistle
- Julian Royce as Peebles
- A. Bromley Davenport as Mr. Fielding

== Reception ==
Kine Weekly wrote: "Measured in laughs, this farcical comedy, written expressly for the screen by Tom Geraghty, gives tremendous value for money. The story is original, and it is interpreted by an all-star team which is fully alive to its immense possibilities. Quickly off the mark, it maintains is hurricane tempo until the smartly engineered climax is reached. Slapstick and straight comedy, both smartly timed, are adroitly blended and set in perfect atmosphere, hence its wide appeal. Miles ahead of the average British comedy, and the American for that matter, the film is great fun, an excellent general booking."

The Daily Film Renter wrote: "Notable come-back for Monty Banks, with Claude Dampier revealed as screen find and supporting cast playing up spiritedly. Swift moving, plentifully supplied with hilarious situations, and direction introducing vein of rich comedy and whole-hearted fooling."
