= Tollycraft =

American boat manufacturer

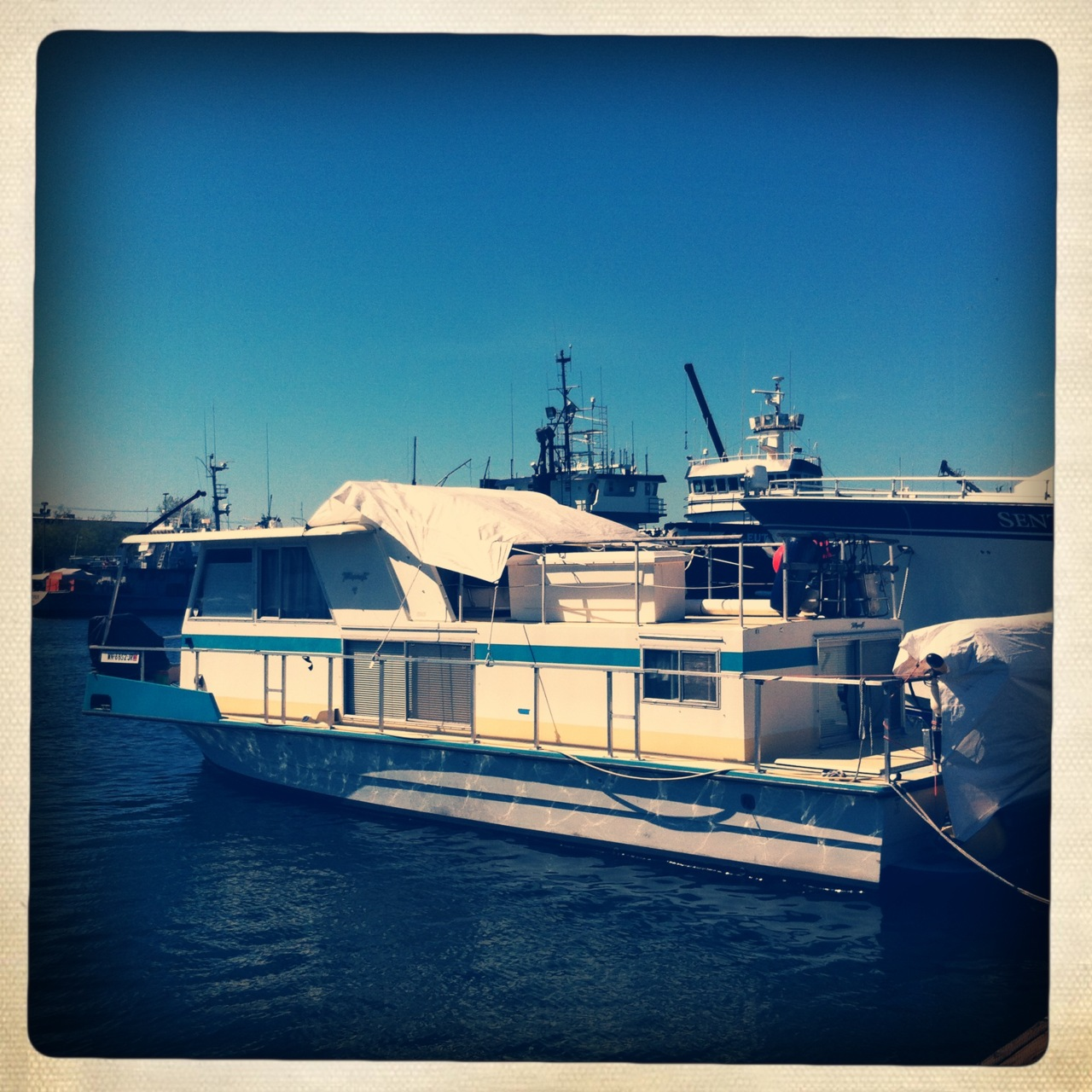
- A Tollycraft houseboat at Seattle's Fishermen's Terminal
- Founded: 1952; 73 years ago
- Founder: Robert Merland Tollefson
- Defunct: 1997

Tollycraft was an American powerboat manufacturer in business from 1952 to 1997.

== History ==
Tollycraft was founded in 1952 as a wooden boat builder by Robert Merland Tollefson (better known as Tolly). In 1962 the company switched to building its boats from fiberglass. Tollefson sold the company in 1987, and it was bankrupt by 1993. Although it attempted to resume operations, the company went out of business in 1997.

Tollycraft was known to make high-quality boats ideally suited to the waters of its home in the Pacific Northwest.
