= Smith Island cottontail =

Conservation status
- Extinct (1987)

Scientific classification
- Kingdom: Animalia
- Phylum: Chordata
- Class: Mammalia
- Order: Lagomorpha
- Family: Leporidae
- Genus: Sylvilagus
- Species: S. floridanus
- Subspecies: †S. f. hitchensi

Trinomial name
- †Sylvilagus floridanus hitchensi Mearns, 1911

Subspecies of rabbit

Smith Island cottontail, Smith's Island cottontail or Hitchen's cottontail (Sylvilagus floridanus hitchensi), was a subspecies of the Eastern cottontail rabbit that lived mainly on two islands on the tip of the Delmarva Peninsula in Virginia. It is generally considered to be extinct.

== General ==
Sylvilagus floridanus hitchensi was considered by some to be "a poorly differentiated subspecies at best," but regarded by others as a "well-marked subspecies."

The subspecies lived on Smith Island and Fisherman Island in Virginia. Its home range was 5.5 acres in size. The rabbit may also have occurred on the mainland and on other islands as well.

The subspecies was also called "Hitchen's cottontail" in honor of Captain George D. Hitchens, commander of the life saving station at Smith Island.

== Status ==
Surveys of the S. f. hitchensi population on Smith and Fisherman Islands were done in 1987 and around 1991, and no evidence of the subspecies was found. This indicates that the Smith's Island cottontail is likely extinct. Recent reported sightings of cottontails may be other exotic subspecies that were introduced to the islands. It has been recommended that specimens from present populations be collected to determine if they are S. f. hitchensi or another species.

Despite this, S. f. hitchensi was a candidate for federal endangered or threatened species status in 1994, and was listed as a "Species of Concern" by the United States Fish and Wildlife Service as late as 2007.

== Appearance ==
Sylvilagus floridanus hitchensi were a form similar to Sylvilagus floridanus mallurus; however, the Smith's Island cottontail was paler, had a less contrasting brown coloration, and lacked a black stripe on the ears. Its fur was also heavier and coarser, which gave it a "shaggy" appearance.

Sylvilagus floridanus hitchensi ranged from 400 to 477 mm in length, and 842 to 1533 grams in weight. The females were larger than the males.

== Habitat ==
Sylvilagus floridanus hitchensi was found in brush and grassy areas behind dunes, in marsh borders, in thickets of myrtle and poison ivy, and occasionally in shrubby pine or mixed deciduous and pine forests. Its home range was affected by the type of cover available, and the abundance of food.

== Foraging ==
The diet of the S. f. hitchensi consisted of green vegetation in the summer, and the twigs and bark of small shrubs in the winter. It would also consume herbaceous fruit.

== Behavior ==
The rabbits were generally nocturnal, showing the most activity at dawn and dusk.

The nests of the Smith's Island cottontail were slanting holes lined with leaves, grass and fur.

The start of the breeding season varied between populations and from year-to-year. On average, three to four litters, of three to six kits each, were born each year.
