= Smith Island (Alaska) =

Island in Alaska, United States

Coordinates: 60°31′33.74″N 147°21′34.63″W

Smith Island is an island in the Prince William Sound in Chugach, Alaska, United States. It is located to the east of Eleanor Island, north of Montague Island, and west of Hinchinbrook Island. The island has a maximum elevation of 440 feet (130 m) above the sea level. Its name was first recorded in a land survey in 1900.
