= Steam-powered vessel =

Boat using steam pressure for propulsion

Steam-powered vessels include steamboats and steamships. Smaller steamboats were developed first. They were replaced by larger steamships which were often ocean-going. Steamships required a change in propulsion technology from sail to paddlewheel to screw to steam turbines. The latter innovation changed the design of vessels to one that could move faster through the water. Engine propulsion changed to steam turbine in the early 20th century. In the latter part of the 20th century, these, in turn, were replaced by gas turbines.

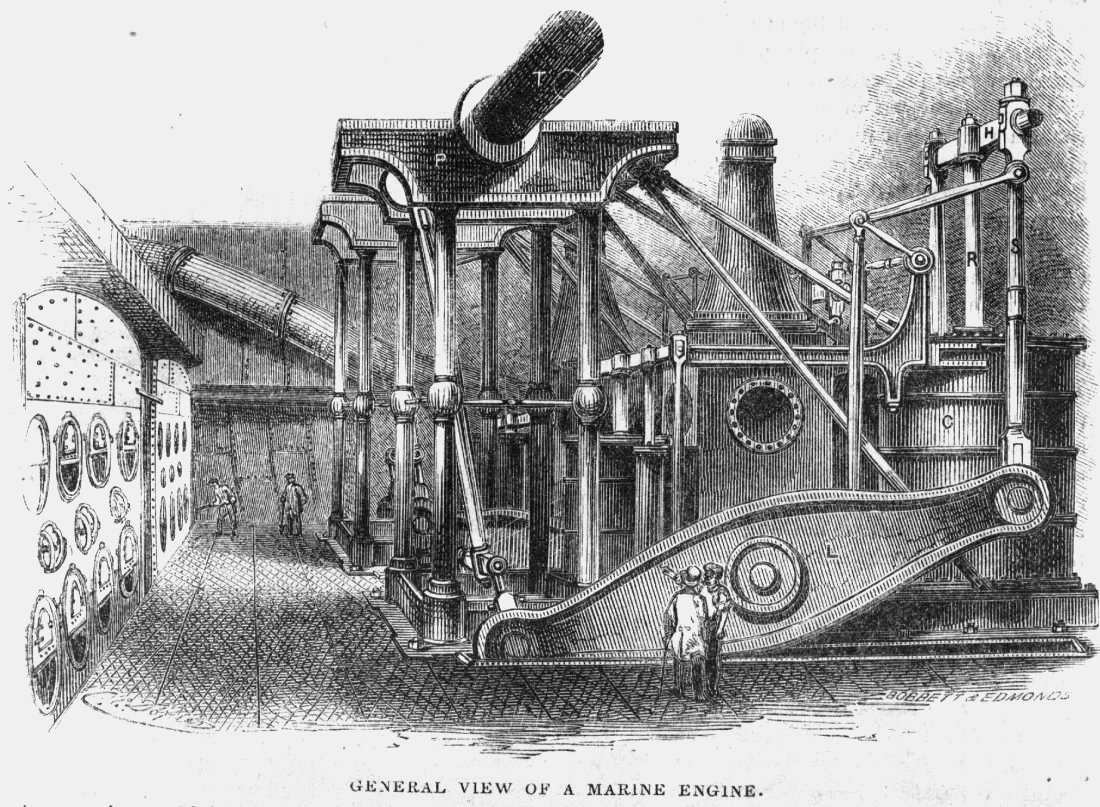
SS Humboldt Engine Room, illustrated in Harper's New Monthly Magazine, No. XII, May 1851, Vol. II

Steamship generally refers to a larger steam-powered ship, usually ocean-going, capable of carrying a (ship's) boat. The SS Humboldt engine room, to the right, is a concept drawing during the construction of the ship. The term steam wheeler is archaic and rarely used. In England, "steam packet", after its sailing predecessor, was the usual term; even "steam barge" could be used (Steam tonnage in Lloyd's Register exceeded sailing ships tonnage by 1865). The French transatlantic steamer SS La Touraine was probably the last of her type to be equipped with sails, although she never used them. Steamships in turn were overtaken by diesel-driven ships in the second half of the 20th century. Most warships used steam propulsion from the 1860s until the late 20th century

== Terminology ==
Screw-driven steamships generally carry the ship prefix "SS" before their names, meaning 'Steam Ship' (or 'Screw Steamer' i.e. 'screw-driven steamship', or 'Screw Schooner' during the 1870s and 1880s, when sail was also carried), paddle steamers usually carry the prefix "PS" and steamships powered by steam turbine may be prefixed "TS" (turbine ship). The term steamer is occasionally used, out of nostalgia, for diesel motor-driven vessels, prefixed "MV".

== Steam production ==
=== Nuclear ===
The production of steam by nuclear marine propulsion units is almost exclusively done in aircraft carriers and submarines, due to the regulations limiting distribution and ownership of the radioactive fuels used to power the plants. Nuclear systems present an additional danger due to the radioactivity of the fuel source and risk of reactor breach.

=== Boiler ===
Most steam propulsion systems use a boiler to produce steam. The boiler burns fuel and then transfers the heat produced into circulating boiler water. Once the water is heated sufficiently it vaporizes into steam and can be used to power a steam engine that produces the mechanical energy that propels the ship.

== Power production ==
=== Turbine ===
Steam can be used to drive a high speed turbine that is connected through some means of transmission to the driving component of the vessel. These are more common on modern ships and were first used in 1897 on the steam ship Turbinia. Nuclear ships almost always use a turbine to harness the energy of the steam that they produce. Steam Driven turbines can either be used to directly power the vessel by means of transmission and gearing to a propeller, or the turbine can be used to generate electricity that is then used to power electric propulsion motors.

=== Piston steam engine ===
A piston steam engine uses trapped steam to move a piston within a cylinder, whose linear motion is eventually converted into rotational motion with the use of a flywheel or some other means. There are many variations on this concept that have developed over the years, but the general concept can be explained as above.

=== Multiple expansion steam engine ===
This type of piston steam engine harnesses the steam that has been used to drive a piston within the engine and uses it to drive one or more additional pistons. This configuration offers increased engine efficiency by improving the force produced per unit of fuel consumed.

== Propulsion methods ==
=== Paddle-wheel ===
A paddle-wheel is a device used to transmit the power produced by the steam engine of the vessel to the surrounding water. The wheel functions by using buckets or paddles attached to the circumference of a rotating wheel that displace water with their movement, ultimately propelling the ship forward.

=== Screw ===
Also known as a propeller, a screw is a device that uses sloped surfaces to transition rotational motion created by the steam engine into an axial force that moves the vessel forward. Systems that use propellers are regarded as more efficient than comparative paddle-wheels due to the reduced weight of rotating components and smaller equipment footprint.

=== Sail and steam powered ===
Early steam powered ships used both steam engines and the power of wind, like more traditional sailing ships. Ships such as these used paddle-wheels or screws to propel themselves when additional speed was necessary or wind conditions were not favorable.

== Uses ==
=== Military ===
Many steam-powered vessels have been commissioned by the military and equipped with weapons and various other equipment for the purpose of providing peacekeeping tools and a platform from which to operate international relations. Some types of steam turbine driven military vessels are long range submarines and aircraft carriers, although these ships can also be classified as nuclear powered vessels.

=== Commercial ===
Steam ships were used to transport goods and personnel across oceans and within coastal areas. Steam powered tugboats were created for the purpose of manipulating larger vessels at within ports or areas with limited maneuverability. Steam vessels were a practical solution for the international transportation of people.

=== Personal use ===
Many steam vessels have been built or fallen under the category of privately owned. These vessels can be luxury cruisers or decommissioned commercial vessels, especially now as the nostalgia value surrounding steam technology increases. Now steam vessels are not nearly as common as yachts with a more conventional power-train, mostly due to the scarcity and special knowledge required to operate and maintain these vessels.

== Danger ==
High temperature steam can cause injury in humans on areas of exposed skin or by other means. Steam can cause burns through direct contact or by inhalation of vapors. Steam boilers also present an explosion hazard due to their high pressure contents. If over pressurization occurs and safety relief systems malfunction it is possible for a boiler to explode and cause damage to people and equipment surrounding it.

== Notable steam vessels ==
=== RMS Titanic ===
The RMS Titanic was the largest ocean-going passenger ship at the time of its creation in 1912. The ship sank only days into its maiden voyage from Southampton to New York after it struck an iceberg and took on water, killing over 1,500 people.

=== Seawise Giant ===
The Seawise Giant supertanker was the largest steam-powered ship ever created and the largest ship ever built, before it was scrapped in 2010. It was over 450 meters in length.

=== RMS Lusitania ===
The RMS Lusitania was a steam-propelled passenger vessel sunk off the Old Head of Kinsale, Ireland by a German U-boat in 1915. The sinking of the Lusitania played a role in involving the United States with the developing World War.

=== HMHS Britannic ===
The HMHS Britannic was a successor to the Titanic, built as a luxury cruise liner. With the onset of World War I, the ship was drafted for wartime efforts and converted to a hospital ship. It was sunk in 1916 by a German naval mine.

=== USS Monitor ===
The USS Monitor was a tactically valuable ironclad Union warship built in 1862, used to gain naval supremacy against Confederate ironclads until it sank later that year. The ship was heavily armed with a single rotating turret at the center of the ship and had very little surface area above water.

== See also ==
- Steamboat
- Steamship
