= Smith Island Light =

Lighthouse in Washington, United States

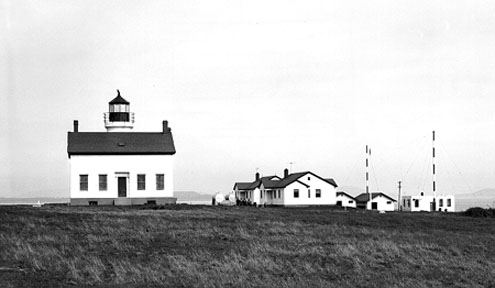
- Smith Island Lighthouse
- Location: Smith Island (Washington)
- Coordinates: 48°19′05″N 122°50′39″W

Tower
- Constructed: 1858
- Construction: brick
- Height: 15 m (49 ft)
- Heritage: National Register of Historic Places listed place

Light
- First lit: 1957
- Deactivated: Abandoned 1957, lost to erosion 1998
- Focal height: 30 m (98 ft)
- Characteristic: Fl W 10s
- Smith Island Light Station
- U.S. National Register of Historic Places
- Area: 0.1 acres (0.040 ha)
- Built: 1858
- Engineer: Hartman Bache
- NRHP reference No.: 78002746
- Added to NRHP: April 6, 1978

Skunk Bay Memorial Lighthouse
- Location: near Hansville, Washington
- Coordinates: 47°55′09″N 122°34′11″W

Tower
- Constructed: 1964, by Jim Gibbs
- Height: 30 feet (9.1 m)
- Shape: Octagonal cylindrical wooden tower

Light
- Characteristic: Continuous red light

The Smith Island Light was a lighthouse on Smith Island, Island County, Washington.

== History ==
The Smith Island Light was constructed in 1858 using the classic New England design of a 1 1/2-story keeper's house with a light tower centered on the roof. Electric power was provided by a bank of 18 lead-acid truck batteries connected in series and recharged by gasoline-powered generators. The structure stood about 200 feet (61 m) from the island's western edge. The bluff began to erode, and when the bluff reached the front door in the 1950s, the lighthouse was abandoned.

It was added to the National Register of Historic Places in 1978. The broken lighthouse could be seen clinging precariously to the bluff from the 1980s until the spring of 1998, when the last remains toppled into the sea.

The lighthouse was replaced with an automated navigational light emanating on a 97-foot (30 m) focal plane from a 50-foot (15 m) skeletal tower constructed in 1957. The tower also houses a weather station operated by the United States National Oceanic and Atmospheric Administration.

Before erosion toppled it into the sea, maritime author Jim Gibbs obtained permission from the Coast Guard to retrieve the lantern room. The lantern room is now part of the privately owned Skunk Bay Memorial Lighthouse located on northern tip of the Kitsap Peninsula near Hansville.
