= Smith Island (Washington) =

Island in Washington, United States

Coordinates: 48°19′06″N 122°50′36″W

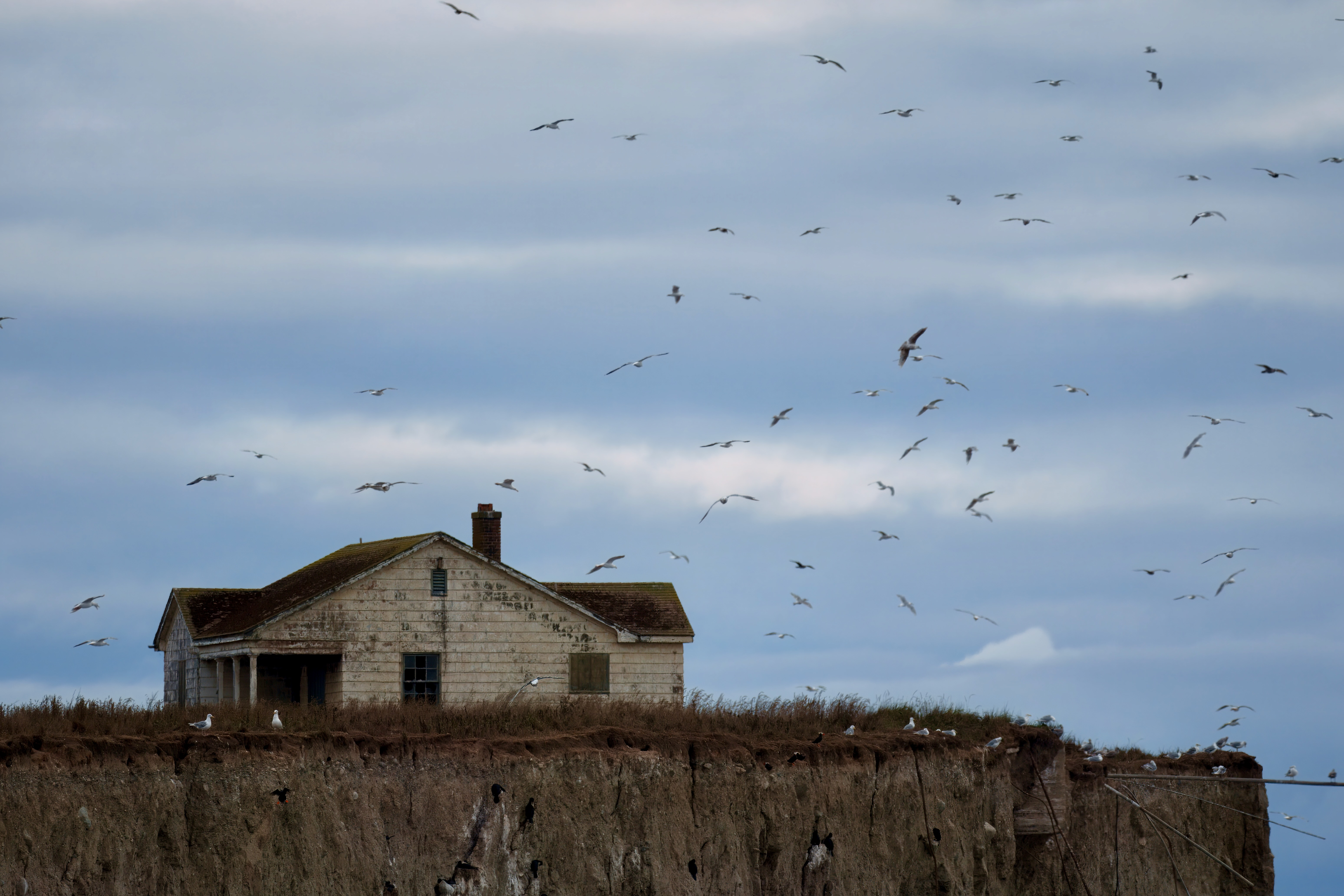
Gulls and murres circling the old Coast Guard station on Smith Island.

Smith Island is located in the eastern Strait of Juan de Fuca, Washington, about midway between Admiralty Inlet and Lopez Island. It is connected to the smaller Minor Island, to its east, by a low spit that is covered at high tide. The low, grassy islands have a few trees and are an important habitat for seabirds, and the beaches are a resting site for sea lions. The islands are part of the San Juan Islands National Wildlife Refuge, and are usually closed to the public.

The Smith Island Light was constructed on the island in 1858. Originally, this stood about 200 feet away from the island's western edge. The bluff began to erode, and when the bluff reached the front door in the 1950s, the lighthouse was abandoned. During the 1980s until the spring of 1998, the last part of the broken lighthouse clung precariously to the bluff.

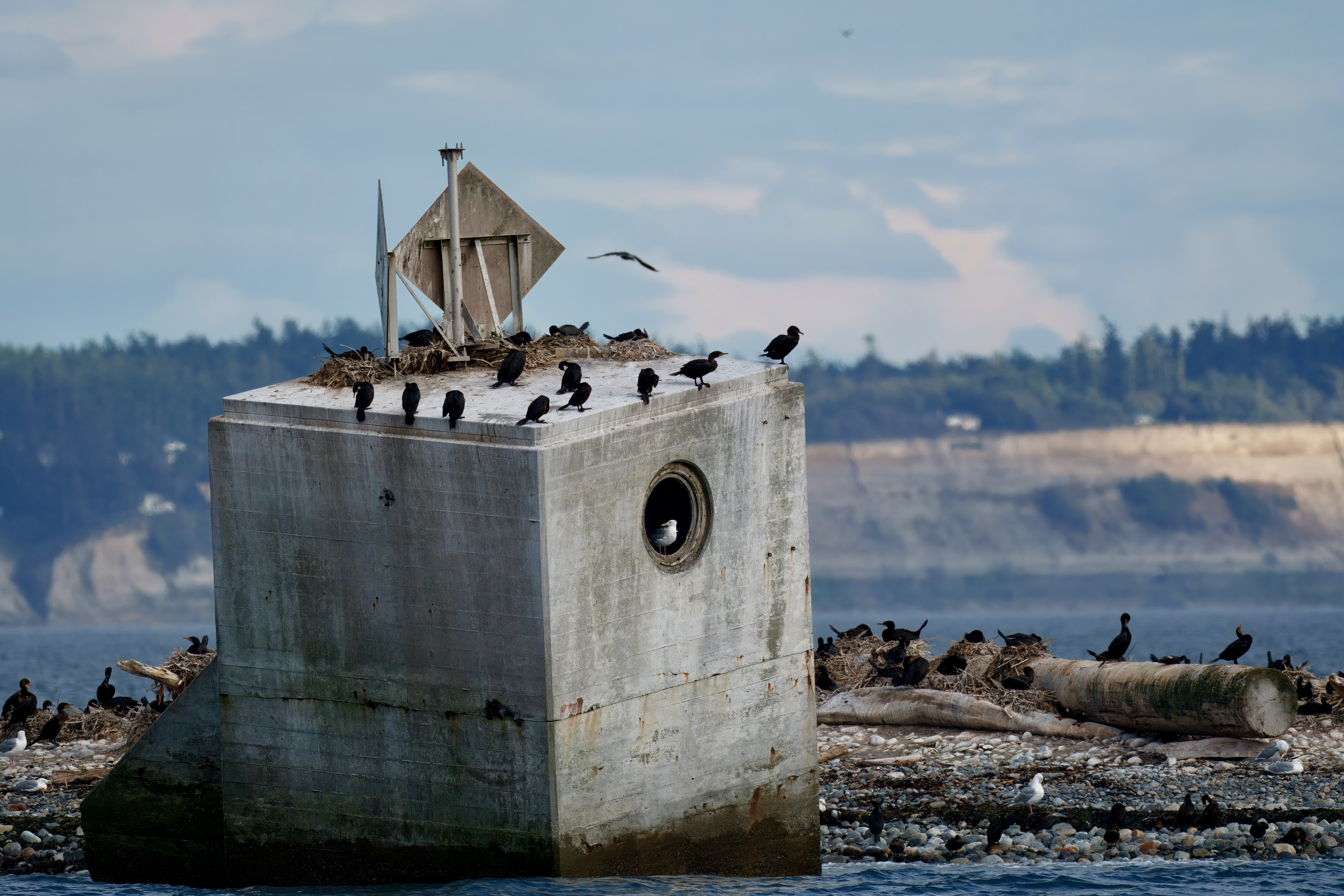
Cormorants nesting on a navigation marker on Minor Island.

The lighthouse was replaced with an automated navigational light 97 feet (30 meters) high. Minor Island also has a light. The island is also the site of a weather station operated by the United States National Oceanic and Atmospheric Administration.

Smith Island was discovered in 1791 by José María Narváez, who called it Isla de Bonilla. It received its present name from Hudson's Bay Company traders in the first half of the 19th century.

Travel to these islands requires the largest open-water transit in Washington State. Their nearest neighbor is Whidbey Island, approximately four nautical miles distant.
