= Thompson Buchanan =

American dramatist

Thompson Buchanan (June 21, 1877 - October 15, 1937) was an American writer. While a journalist he began writing novels, and then turned to plays, with 1909's A Woman's Way starring Grace George being his first hit. He began writing for movies in 1916, and also wrote radio sketches.

Buchanan was married twice. First to Katharine Winterbotham from 1915-1927, and then actress Joan Lowell from 1927-1929. When Winterbotham married a man from India, Kumar Jehan Seesodia-Warliker, Buchanan successfully sued for custody of their son on the grounds that Seesodia-Warliker was not white.

Buchanan died in Louisville, Kentucky on October 15, 1937, suffering a heart attack during a trip to visit family.

== Selected bibliography ==
- The Castle Comedy (1904 novel)
- Judith Triumphant (1905 novel)
- The Intruder (1908 play)
- A Woman's Way (1909 play)
- The Cub (1910 play)
- The Rack (1911 play)
- Life (1914 play)
- Civilian Clothes (1919 play)
- The Sporting Thing To Do (1922 play)
