= Bring 'Em Back Alive: The Best of Frank Buck =

Compilation of OOP writing

- Author: Frank Buck, Edward Anthony, Ferrin Fraser, Carol Weld, Steven Lehrer
- Language: English
- Subject: nature, jungle animals, biography
- Published: 2000
- Publisher: Texas Tech University Press
- Publication place: United States
- Pages: 256
- ISBN: 0-89672-430-1
- OCLC: 43207125
- Dewey Decimal: 591.5
- LC Class: QL61 .B78 2000
- Website: stevenlehrer.com/buckweb

Bring 'Em Back Alive: The Best of Frank Buck is a compilation of excerpts from five of the eight books coauthored by animal collector and multi-platform media personality Frank Buck during his lifetime, as edited by writer and physician Steven Lehrer.

Buck's books are long out of print and remain copyrighted, (Note: Animals Are Like That (1939) has entered the public domain in the United States and is available online via HathiTrust.) and are thus generally inaccessible outside of academic or major municipal libraries. However, Buck's statements are a primary source on the exotic animal trade and development of American zoos in the early 20th century; The Best of Frank Buck has been assigned reading in a university course on the role of zoos in science and culture. Buck is also an important figure in American cultural history, "as renowned in his day as Charles Lindbergh, Admiral Richard E. Byrd, or Babe Ruth."

The scholarly introduction by Steven Lehrer is valuable source of historiography and biographical information on Buck and his three major coauthors, Edward Anthony, Ferrin Fraser, and Carol Weld. Buck's daughter Barbara Buck granted Lehrer permission to use her father's work and shared some photographs for publication. The hardback edition endpapers are a "Bring 'Em Back Alive" map of Southeast Asia illustrated by Kurt Wiese.

== Contents ==
In addition to the chapters listed below, the book contains a 15-page introduction written by Lehrer, a references section, and an index.

Chapter No.	Chapter Title	Source Book	Page No.
I.	Tapir on a Rampage	Bring 'Em Back Alive (1930)	3
II.	Giant Jungle Man	Bring 'Em Back Alive (1930), with excerpt from Fang and Claw (1935)	12
III.	Jungle Laundress	Bring 'Em Back Alive (1930)	31
IV.	Chips Lends a Hand	Bring 'Em Back Alive (1930)	40
V.	Man-Eater	Bring 'Em Back Alive (1930)	50
VI.	Baby Boo	Bring 'Em Back Alive (1930)	69
VII.	Monkey Mothers	Bring 'Em Back Alive (1930)	80
VIII.	Elephant Temper	Bring 'Em Back Alive (1930)	94
IX.	Monkey Mischief	Bring 'Em Back Alive (1930)	94
X.	Loose on Board	Bring 'Em Back Alive (1930)	124
XI.	King Cobra	Bring 'Em Back Alive (1930)	137
XII.	The Patsy	Wild Cargo (1932)	150
XIII.	Killer of Killers	Wild Cargo (1932)	162
XIV.	A Bear in Time	Wild Cargo (1932)	177
XV.	Spitting Cobra	Wild Cargo (1932)	186
XVI.	Animal Magic	Wild Cargo (1932)	195
XVII.	Coiled Lightning	Wild Cargo (1932), with excerpts from Animals Are Like That! (1940) and All in a Lifetime (1941)	207
XVIII.	Terrible Tusks	Wild Cargo (1932)	219
XIX.	Striped Demon	Wild Cargo (1932), with excerpt from Animals Are Like That! (1940)	243
