= Bring 'Em Back Alive =

Bring 'Em Back Alive may refer to the book by the collector of animals, Frank Buck, published in 1930. Buck created the documentary film of the same name in association with RKO Pictures, released in 1932. A 1980s fictional television series of the same name revolves on Frank Buck in Singapore.

- Bring 'Em Back Alive (book), a 1930 non-fiction adventure book by Frank Buck
- Bring 'Em Back Alive (film), a 1932 jungle adventure documentary starring Frank Buck
- Bring 'Em Back Alive (TV series), a 1982–83 adventure television series starring Bruce Boxleitner as Frank Buck
- Bring 'Em Back Alive (music album), 1992 live album by the band Dixie Dregs
- Bring 'Em Back Alive: The Best of Frank Buck, a 2000 compilation of stories from Buck's books, with a scholarly essay by Steven Lehrer
