= Wild Cargo =

Wild Cargo may refer to:

- Wild Cargo (film), a 1934 jungle adventure documentary
- Wild Cargo (book), a 1932 book by Frank Buck
