= Frank Duck Brings 'Em Back Alive =

1946 Donald Duck cartoon

- Theatrical release poster
- Directed by: Jack Hannah
- Story by: Dick Kinney
- Produced by: Walt Disney
- Starring: Pinto Colvig; Clarence Nash
- Music by: Oliver Wallace
- Animation by: Al Coe; Andy Engman; Hugh Fraser; Jim Moore
- Layouts by: Yale Gracey
- Backgrounds by: Thelma Witmer
- Color process: Technicolor
- Production company: Walt Disney Productions
- Distributed by: RKO Radio Pictures
- Release date: November 1, 1946
- Running time: 7 minutes
- Country: United States
- Language: English

Frank Duck Brings 'Em Back Alive is a 1946 animated short film produced by Walt Disney Productions and released by RKO Radio Pictures. In this installment of the Donald & Goofy series, Donald Duck appears as "Frank Duck", a jungle explorer determined to capture a live "wild man", played by Goofy. The film was directed by Jack Hannah and features the voices of Clarence Nash as Donald and Pinto Colvig as Goofy.

The character Frank Duck and the title of the film are spoofs of Frank Buck and his 1930 book Bring 'Em Back Alive which was adapted into a 1932 documentary film.

== Plot ==
Goofy appears as a wild man living in an African jungle, gracefully swinging from vine to vine (a nod to Tarzan).

Employed by the Ajax Circus, Frank Duck (Donald) arrives in the jungle on a river boat in search of a wild man. After Goofy bungles an attempt to kill Frank, Frank presents the illiterate wild man with a contract which the wild man eventually eats. Frank tries to capture the wild man and put him into a cage, but the wild man escapes, seemingly unintentionally, and helps Frank load the empty cage onto his boat.

Upon realizing his mistake, Frank angrily returns with the cage and continues to chase the wild man until he chases him into a lion's den. Viewing them as food, the lion walks into the den and starts chasing them. In the ensuing chaos, Frank and the wild man find themselves wearing each other's clothes. The lion chases them back to Frank's boat, which the wild man hops into and drives away, leaving Frank to be chased by the lion.

== Voice cast ==
- Donald Duck: Clarence Nash
- Goofy: Pinto Colvig

== Releases ==
- 1946 - theatrical release
- 1992-2000 - Donald's Quack Attack, episode 5

== Home media ==
The short was released on December 6, 2005, on Walt Disney Treasures: The Chronological Donald, Volume Two: 1942-1946.
