= The Big Cage =

1933 film

- Directed by: Kurt Neumann
- Written by: Edward Anthony; Clyde Beatty (book); Edward Anthony (screenplay); Ferdinand Reyher (screenplay); Clarence Marks (additional dialogue)
- Produced by: Carl Laemmle Jr
- Starring: Clyde Beatty; Anita Page; Mickey Rooney; Raymond Hatton
- Cinematography: George Robinson
- Edited by: Phillip Cahn
- Music by: Sam Perry
- Distributed by: Universal
- Release date: May 1, 1933
- Running time: 82 minutes
- Country: United States
- Language: English

The Big Cage is a 1933 American pre-Code circus film starring Clyde Beatty and Anita Page, and featuring Raymond Hatton, Wallace Ford, Andy Devine and Mickey Rooney, with Walter Brennan and Louise Beavers in bit parts. It was originally released by Universal Pictures.

The film was the debut of Beatty, whose skills as an animal trainer in circuses had brought him fame since his late teens and made him a national celebrity. As in his three subsequent films, he plays a fictionalized version of himself, also named Clyde Beatty. The film proved to be one of the studio's most popular releases in 1933 and was reissued several times in second-run theaters into the early 1950s.
