= All in a Lifetime =

1941 autobiography by Frank Buck

All In a Lifetime
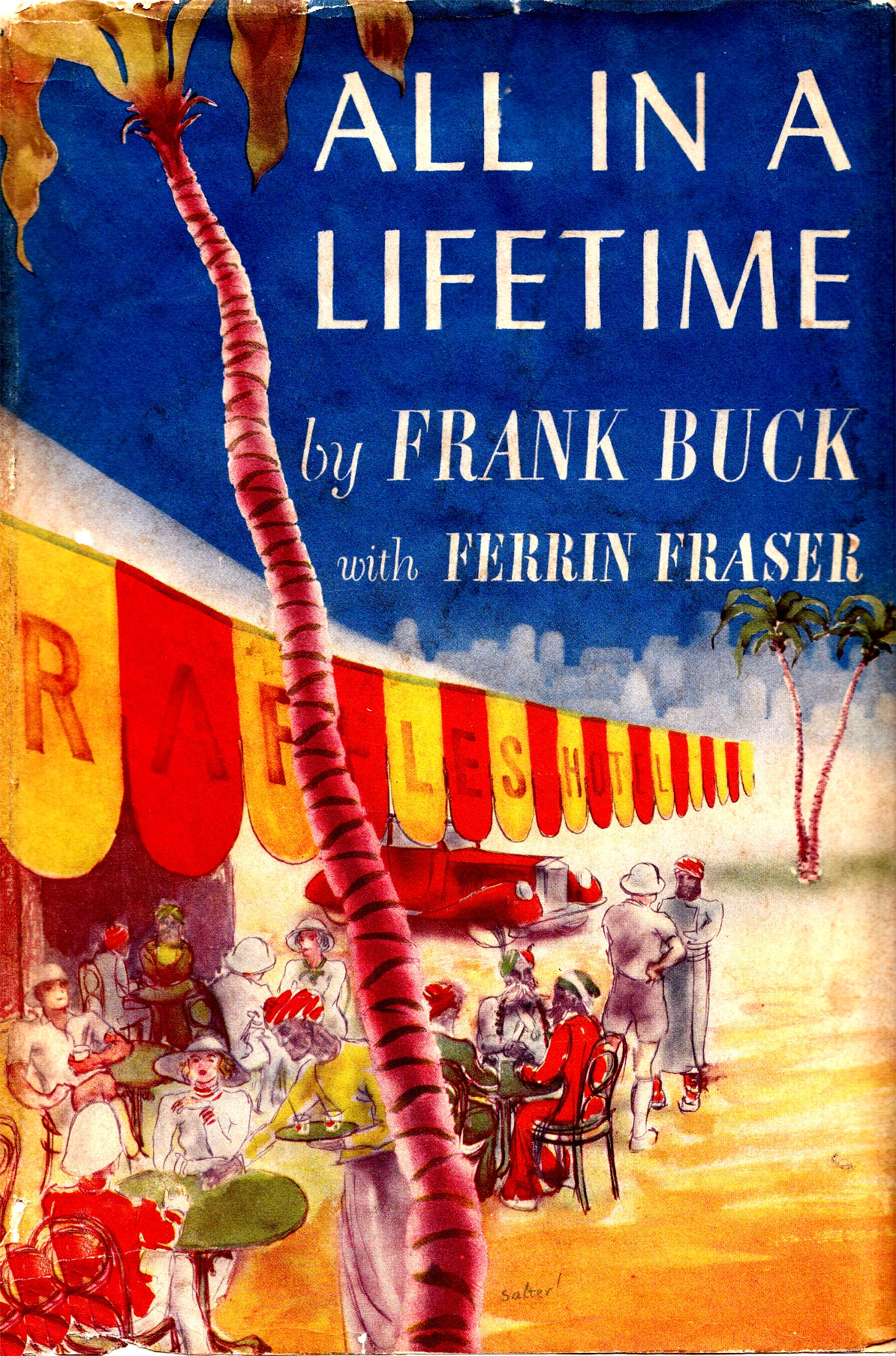
- First edition cover
- Author: Frank Buck; Ferrin Fraser
- Language: English
- Genre: autobiography
- Publisher: Robert M. McBride
- Publication date: 1941
- Publication place: United States
- Media type: Print (Hardback)
- Pages: 277
- Preceded by: Animals Are Like That (1939)
- Followed by: Jungle Animals (1945)

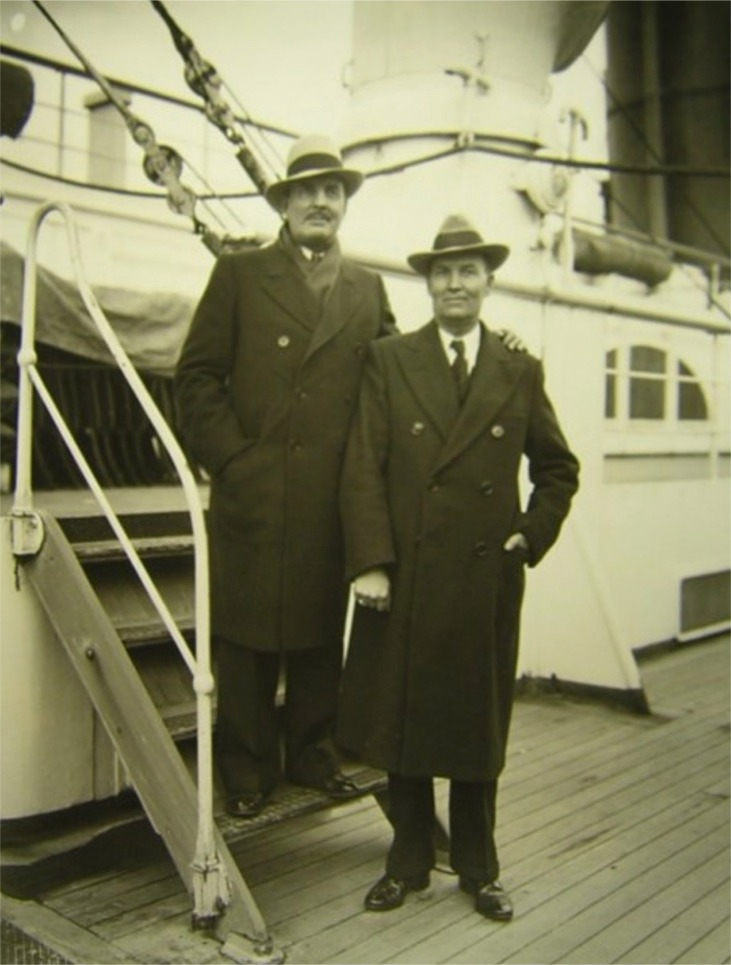
Co-authors Buck (left) and Fraser, ca. 1940

All in a Lifetime by Frank Buck, with Ferrin Fraser, is Buck’s autobiography.

Buck spent much of his life collecting wild animals and as a boy was a bit wild himself. He became a bellhop in a Chicago hotel, got into bad company, and just missed becoming a safe blower. He was "a fighting fool," who "loved the lusty thud of fists on flesh."

Buck's marriage to Amy Leslie, drama critic for the Chicago Daily News, brought him in contact with many people of the stage. But the open spaces called him, and with $3,500 he won in a poker game he embarked on a career trademarked by the slogan "Bring 'em back alive." His first expedition took him to Brazil, where he bought from native trappers an assortment of jungle birds. Other expeditions followed, and Buck brought back wild animals of all kinds. Buck himself became expert in the trapping of jungle beasts. He explains how to catch a live python and how to determine whether the serpent is sick or not; you simply examine his mouth, and if it has a clean pink tint, the python is healthy. A paler shade with red blotches on the jaws and inner lips mean that the snake will almost certainly die soon.

Buck makes the surprising confession that he has a deep-seated fear of riding in airplanes. This anxiety kept him from accepting Martin Johnson's invitation to accompany him on the 1937 trip that was Johnson's last tragic flight. Buck also escaped death when he was locked for several hours in a steamship refrigerator. He says the experience left him with a bad case of claustrophobia, and that he cannot bear the thought of a plane's small cabin with a locked door.

== Critical reception ==
"The book has a high content of reader interest throughout..."
"Easy, unpretentious...Chance, friendship, danger, and success furnish interest. Sidelights on the last fifty years and on notable people are entertaining to contemporaries." Catherine Van Dyne. Library J 66:263 Mar 15 1941
"Mr Buck's book is profusely illustrated and packed with plenty of adventure...It is fit company for Frank Buck's other volumes." Springfield Republican p6 Mar 31 1941
"Frank Buck's lusty life story is full of thrilling adventure." Chicago Tribune - Apr 30, 1941
