= Tim Thompson in the Jungle =

1935 novel by Frank Buck

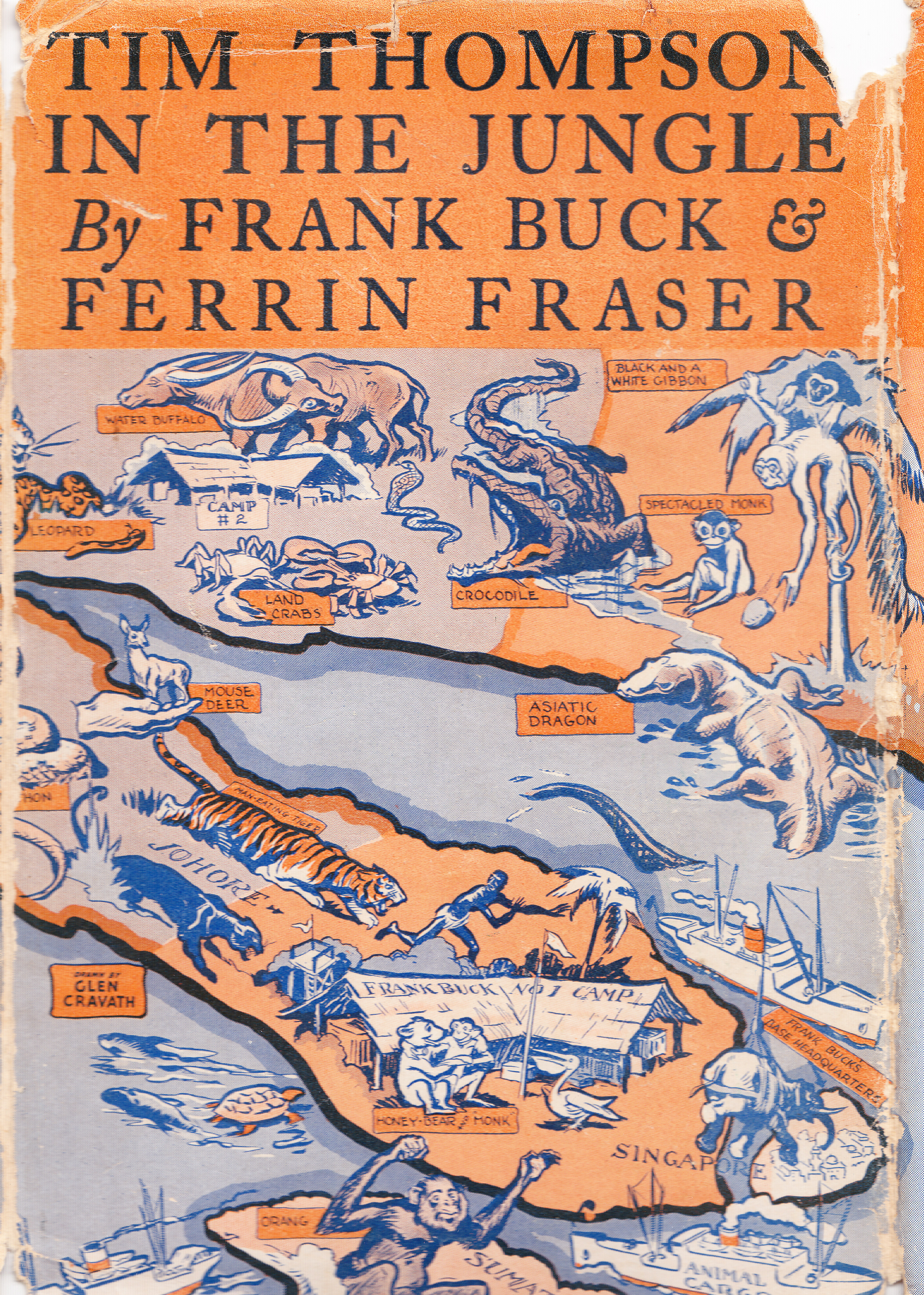
- first edition cover (1935)
- Author: Frank Buck; Ferrin Fraser
- Language: English
- Genre: fiction
- Publisher: D. Appleton & Company
- Publication date: 1935
- Publication place: United States
- Media type: Print (Hardback)
- Pages: 208
- Preceded by: Fang and Claw
- Followed by: On Jungle Trails

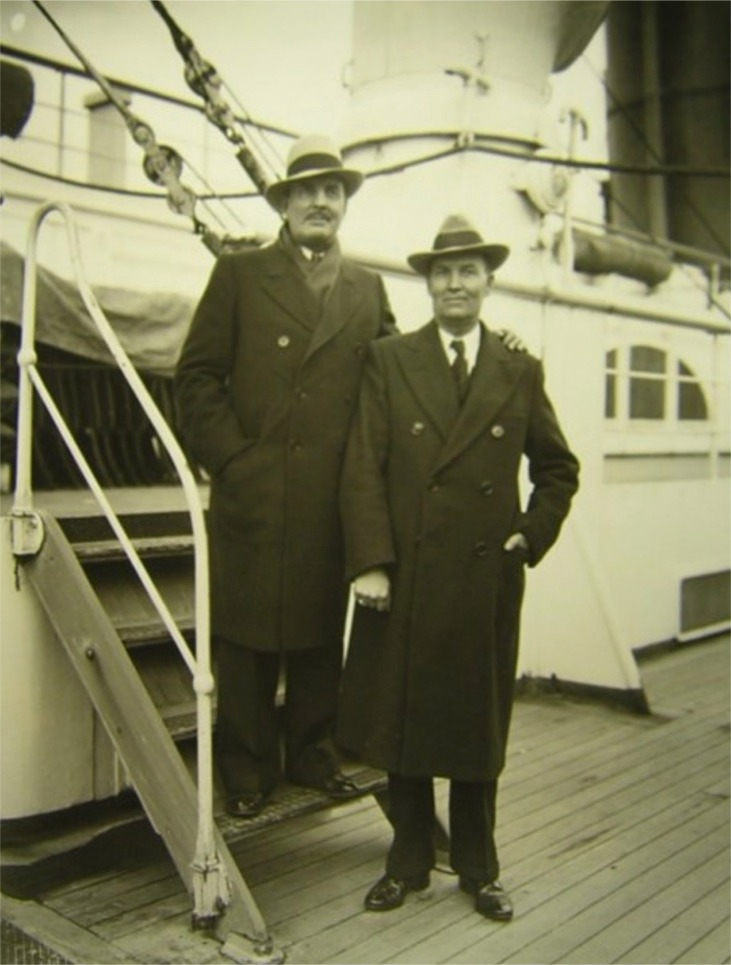
Co-authors Buck (left) and Fraser, ca. 1940

Tim Thompson in the Jungle was Frank Buck's fourth book, which, in a fictionalized version, continued his stories of capturing exotic animals.

== Story ==
Tim Thompson, a young boy, stows away aboard Frank Buck's ship at Singapore that he might accompany Buck, his hero, on a jungle expedition. The story of their adventures is told by Ferrin Fraser, based on Buck's own experiences, except for the introduction of certain characters, notably a villain, Rawson, who is lying in wait at Ceylon. At the climax, Tim Thompson, awestruck, watches as Buck descends into a pit and takes a man-eating tiger by the tail. The book has sixteen full-page illustrations grouped at the end.

== Critical reception ==
- "Readers of Bring 'Em Back Alive and Fang and Claw will recognize many of the episodes in this book, but rewritten as they are, with the addition of young Tim Thompson, Rawson, the villain, and other characters, they appear all the more exciting especially to the youthful minds for whom they are intended. The story is also informative, containing factual descriptions of the habits of birds and animals in the jungle, an advantage many books of adventure do not possess."
- "The best parts of the book are the descriptions of the jungle, and of the habits of its animals and birds, for these are the outcome of Mr. Buck's twenty years' experience in bringing animals back alive. Young readers may pick up some useful lessons in tracking and forest-craft…"
