= Frank Buck Zoo =

- Frank Buck Zoo logo

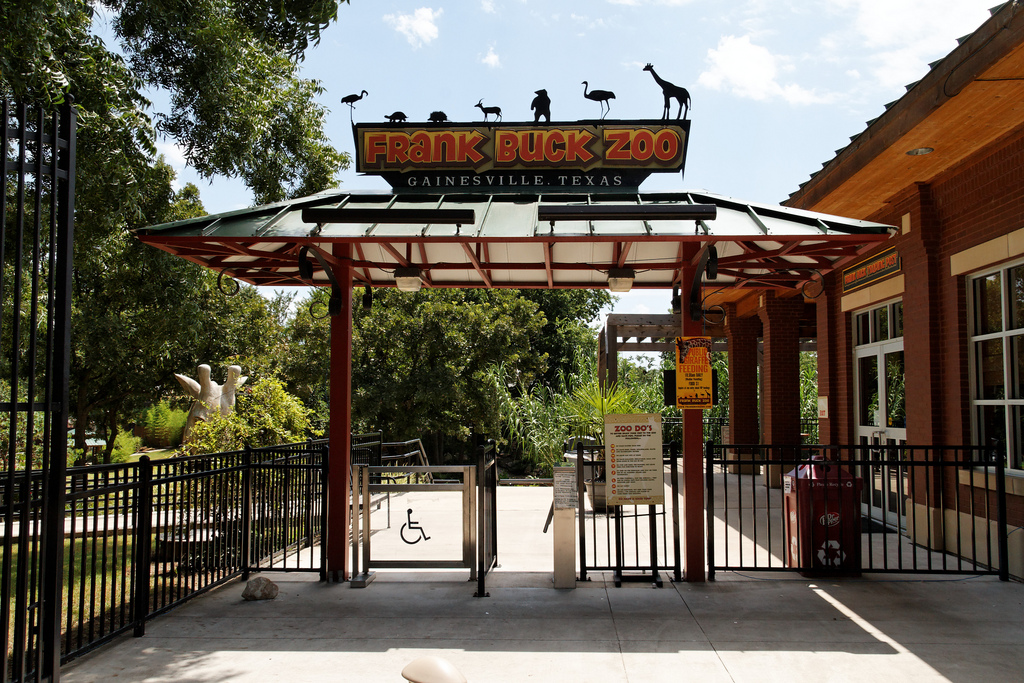
- Zoo entrance (photo July 2010)
- Interactive map of Frank Buck Zoo
- 33.621678°N 97.154203°W
- Date opened: Opened in 1930 at Fair Park, Gainesville and relocated to present site in 1962
- Location: Gainesville, Texas, United States
- No. of animals: 130+
- Annual visitors: 65,000 (2009)
- Memberships: ZAA
- Website: www.frankbuckzoo.com

Frank Buck Zoo is a small zoo founded in 1930 and located in the 30 acres (12.1 ha) Leonard Park in Gainesville, Texas, United States. The zoo started as the Gainesville Community Circus in 1930. It is home to more than 130 animals.

== History ==
The zoo was founded by A. Morton Smith as Gainesville Community Circus, and opened in 1930 at the Cooke County Fair, Fair Park, in Gainesville. A fire at the zoo in 1954 destroyed circus equipment and from 1954 the animals were kept permanently in enclosures. In 1954 the zoo was renamed after the film actor and director (and Gainesville native) Frank Buck, who collected wild animals from all over the world, and who also worked as a ring master at the zoo.

The zoo was moved to its current location in Leonard Park in 1962.

The Frank Buck Exhibit opened at the zoo in March 2008 showing items donated by Buck's daughter, Barbara Buck, that once belonged to her father including camp tools and media memorabilia.

In 2020, Frank Buck Zoo won an award from the ZAA for their renovated prairie dog enclosure.

== Facilities ==
The handicap and stroller accessible path around the zoo is about a mile long, with an elevated walkway over the Bennet's and swamp wallaby and the African savanna, with giraffe, common ostrich, helmeted guinea fowl and Nubian ibex. Visitors see the giraffes at eye level and can feed them during the public feeding every day. Frank Buck Zoo is also home to many other different species of animals from across the world, with Asian small clawed otters, Chilean flamingos, American black bears, and many other animals.
