= On Jungle Trails =

1936 book-length compilation of Frank Buck's stories

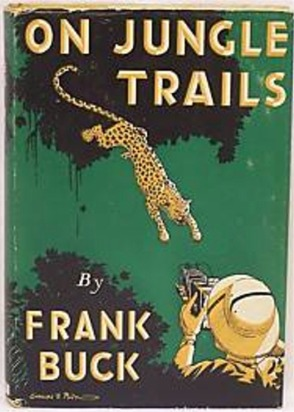
- On Jungle Trails (1936)
- Author: Frank Buck; Ferrin Fraser
- Language: English
- Publisher: Frederick A. Stokes Co.
- Publication date: 1936
- Publication place: United States
- Media type: Print (Hardback)
- Pages: 280
- Preceded by: Tim Thompson in the Jungle (1935)
- Followed by: Animals Are Like That (1939)

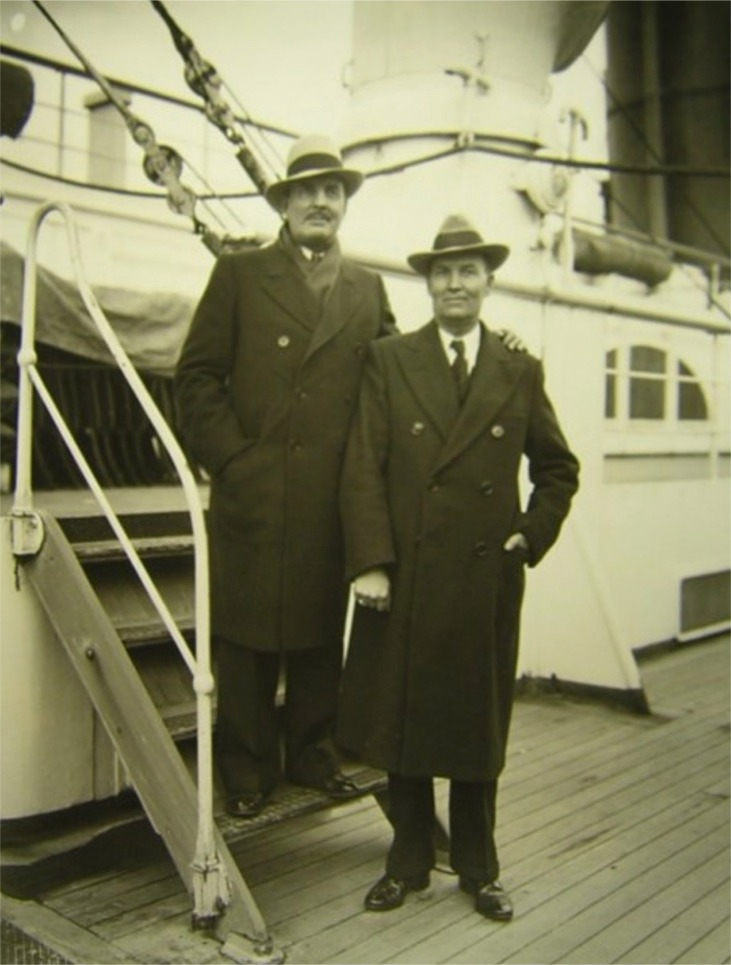
Co-authors Buck (left) and Fraser, c. 1940

On Jungle Trails is a book-length compilation of Frank Buck’s stories describing how he captures wild animals. For many years, this book was a fifth grade reader in the Texas public schools, approved for state-wide use.

Some of the facts Buck relates are observational, such as his description of the pangolin, a scaly anteater, getting his fill of red ants. Among the other accounts:

- Buck describes the capture of a man-eating tiger (the only one, he explains, which was ever brought to America, the Man-eater of Johore);
- Buck traps a rare clouded leopard when, contrary to the usual leopard habit, the cat takes refuge in a tree;
- Buck writes of trapping elephants and crocodiles;
- Buck tells of seizing of "the largest orangutan ever captured alive."

Buck brought these animals back to America; but when he obtained several tiny Malaysian mouse deer, the smallest deer in the world, weighing two pounds, and made pets of them, a quarantine against ruminating animals made it impossible to bring them into the United States.

Buck's writes of his jungle camp and his methods for feeding and caring for his animals. At the end of the book there is a partial list of animals which Buck brought back alive to America. In an appendix there are several pages of information about various Asian animals, reptiles and birds. Buck emphasizes his refusal to kill animals and his insistence on kindness to them. "Wherever I go, children mention this book to me and tell me how much they learned about animals and the jungle from it," said Buck.

== Critical reception ==
"The book is so written as to be easily understood by boys and girls, and is intended to interest them especially. It is certainly quite likely to do that."
