= Jungle Animals =

1945 book by Frank Buck

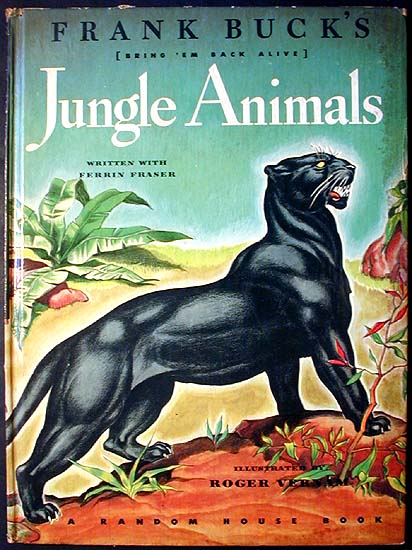
- First edition cover (1945)
- Author: Frank Buck; Ferrin Fraser
- Language: English
- Genre: non-fiction
- Publisher: Random House
- Publication date: 1945
- Publication place: United States
- Media type: Print (Hardback)
- Pages: 55
- Preceded by: All In A Lifetime

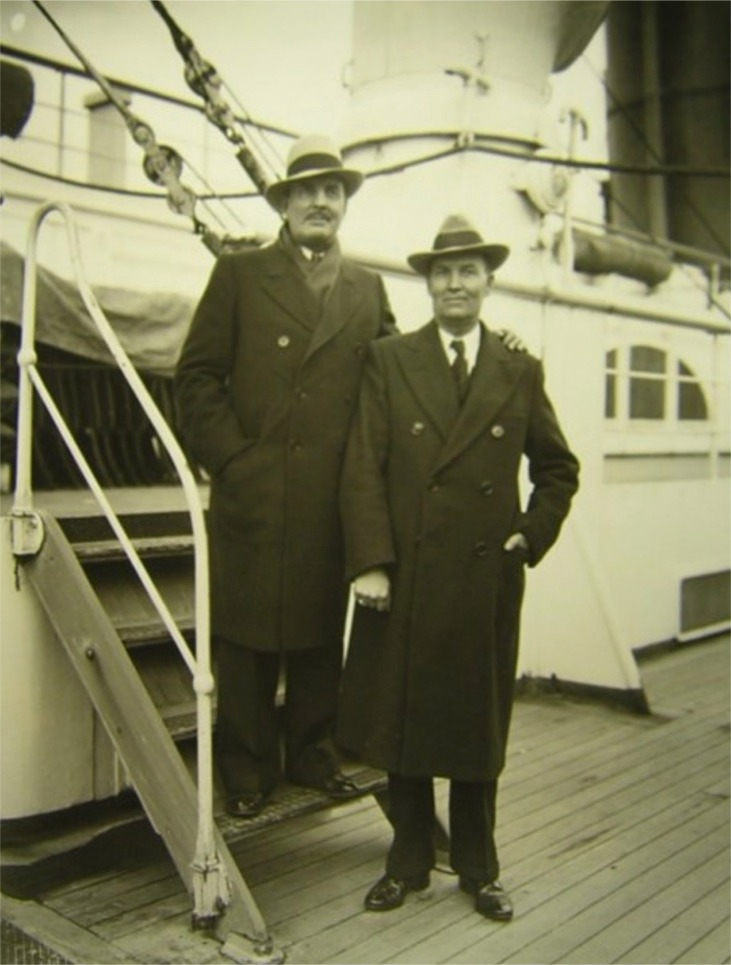
Co-authors Buck (left) and Fraser, ca. 1940

Jungle Animals was Frank Buck’s eighth book, written with Ferrin Fraser, describing some of the animals, birds, and reptiles of the jungle, which Buck had come in contact with in his years of travel around the world. The lavishly illustrated book was intended for schoolchildren grades five to eight. A children’s book illustrator, Roger Vernam (1912–1992), was the artist.

== Critical reception ==
"Large and beautifully illustrated by Roger Vernam, this book is authoritative and fascinating...Best for the pre-high school age, but would interest all."
