= Punggol Zoo =

Animal collection in Singapore (1928–1942

Singapore Zoological Gardens and Bird Park
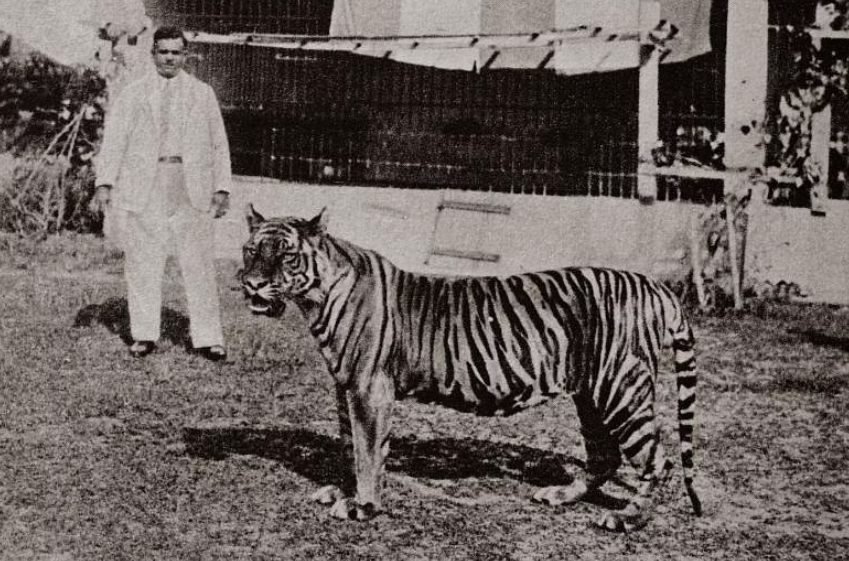
- William Lawrence Soma Basapa with his pet Bengal tiger, Apay, at Punggol Zoo.
- Interactive map of Singapore Zoological Gardens and Bird Park
- 1°24′42.9″N 103°54′42.0″E
- Date opened: 1928; 98 years ago
- Date closed: 1942; 84 years ago
- Location: Punggol, Singapore
- Land area: 10 hectares (100,000 m^{2})
- No. of animals: 200
- Owner: William Lawrence Soma Basapa

The Punggol Zoo, formally Singapore Zoological Gardens and Bird Park, was a former animal collection in Singapore from 1928 to 1942. Founded by Singaporean-Indian land owner William Lawrence Soma Basapa, the name comes from the location on a 10-hectare site on Punggol Road, possibly near Sungei Dekar (now called Coney Channel). The zoo persisted until just before the Japanese occupation of Singapore during World War II.

== History ==
Originally located on 549 Serangoon Road, the private zoo owned by William Lawrence Soma Basapa (1893–1943) had a collection included 200 animals, including a Bengal tiger named Apay, seals, polar bears, chimpanzees, spectacled monkeys, Shetland ponies, zebras, a black leopard, Malayan tapirs, and orangutans, as well as 2,000 birds. Theoretical physicist Albert Einstein had likely visited Basapa's zoo in 1922 while on a fundraising trip for the Hebrew University of Jerusalem. The zoo was also visited and described by international correspondent Sir Percival Phillips. To accommodate large number of both animals and visitors, the zoo was eventually moved to a larger 10-ha plot near the Punggol seafront in 1928.

A python-wrestling scene in the 1935 exploitation film Forbidden Adventure (Note: This film seemingly went by several alternate titles including Angkor, Forbidden Adventure in Angkor, Beyond Shanghai (UK), Inyaah, The Jungle Goddess, Jungle Virgin, Strange Adventures, The Virgin of Sarawak and Dyak.) starring English actor M. H. Kenyon-Slade and directed by George M. Merrick, was reportedly filmed at the Punggol Zoo. The zoo was officially granted a license by the Singapore Rural Board in 1937.

The zoo was forced to close in 1942 when the British Army moved their forces to the north of Singapore in anticipation of invading Imperial Japanese Army forces. The British Army forces, identifying the Punggol end as a potential landing site for the Imperial Japanese Army forces, wanted to make use of the Punggol Zoo as a defensive ground

Basapa was given 24 hours to relocate his animals and birds. The time-frame was too tight so the British took the land, released the birds and shot the rest." Another account says, "The dangerous varieties of animals were killed, while harmless ones were released into the forest."

Reginald Burton, in his memoir of "personal experiences as a captain in the 4th Battalion, Royal Norfolk Regiment, captured by the Japanese after the fall of Singapore in 1942," describes encountering a zebra released from the zoo. He wrote, "Punggol Point had been shelled and there was nobody to care for the animals, so when the 5th Suffolk Regiment took up their position they released what animals they found there, at least giving them a chance of survival."

During the Japanese Occupation of Singapore, the generators and steel cages were removed by Imperial Japanese Army and the land was converted into an ordnance storage to store their supplies and ammunition and the site of a mess. Basapa died in 1943.

By the end of the Japanese Occupation of Singapore, the cages and structures that had been left intact were flattened and the grounds levelled by bulldozers. The estate was enclosed by fences and became a depository for Japanese ammunition and explosives, which were subsequently picked up by lighters and disposed at sea.

In 1948, the land which was inherited by estate trustees after Basapa's death, was sold to a private investor.

The site currently a part of the Punggol Promenade.
