= Fang and Claw (book) =

1935 book by Frank Buck

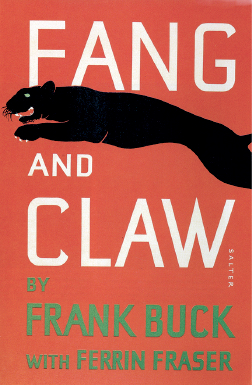
- first edition cover (1935) with a poster design by George Salter
- Author: Frank Buck; Ferrin Fraser
- Language: English
- Publisher: Simon & Schuster
- Publication date: 1935
- Publication place: United States
- Media type: Print (Hardback)
- Pages: 239
- Preceded by: Wild Cargo
- Followed by: Tim Thompson in the Jungle

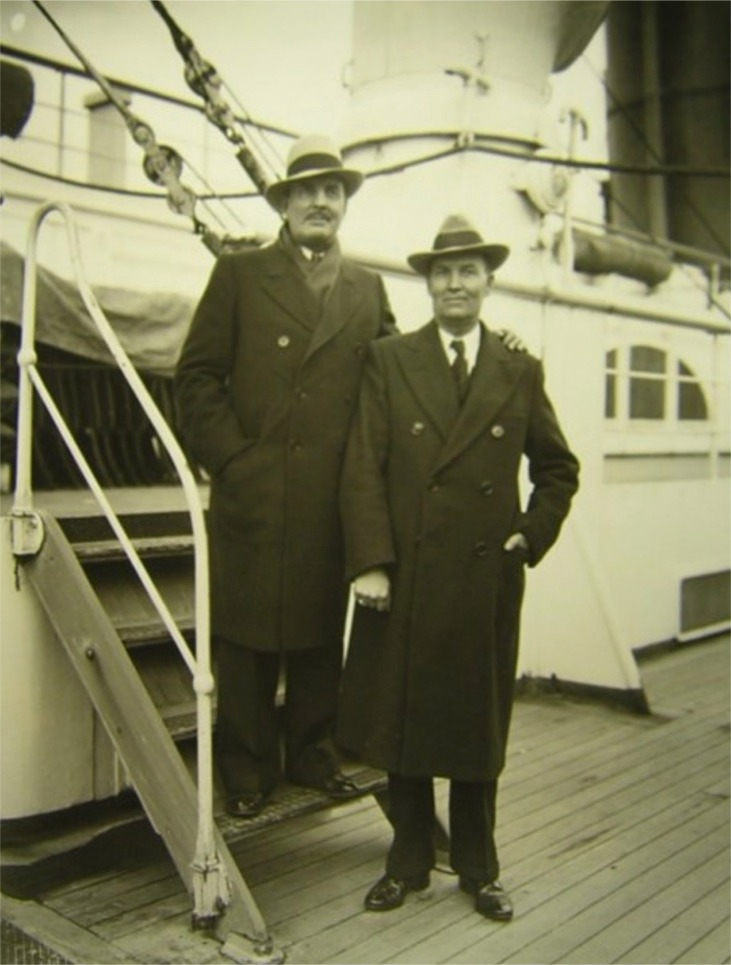
Co-authors Buck (left) and Fraser, ca. 1940

Fang and Claw was Frank Buck’s third book, which continued his stories of capturing exotic animals. Writing with Ferrin Fraser, Buck related many of his experiences working with and observing other people in the jungle.

== Contents ==
In one chapter, a dog that was carried dozens of miles into the jungle to serve as tiger bait succeeded in making so good an impression on the way to the trap that he came to be considered more valuable than a tiger. Buck tells how he himself caught a huge orangutan, whose favorite dish was a molasses sandwich. A jungle necessity, according to Buck, is liquid soap. After rain or even an excessive heavy dew bushes are full of leeches ready to fasten onto any passer-by. Once these creatures take hold they bury their heads and the only way to get rid of them is to burn them out with a lighted cigarette end. But leeches don't like the odor or taste of liquid soap and will seldom burrow through a layer of it to get at the skin. Buck derides little men with big rifles who kill jungle animals, especially elephants, and ranks these men as killers lower than cobras.

== Critical reception ==
"He is one of the rare articulate adventurers who has the good sense not to be forever asserting that he is the fellow who shot the bear...Those who find the title attractive may safely hope for entertainment in the book."
