= Amy Leslie =

American actress and drama critic (1855–1939)

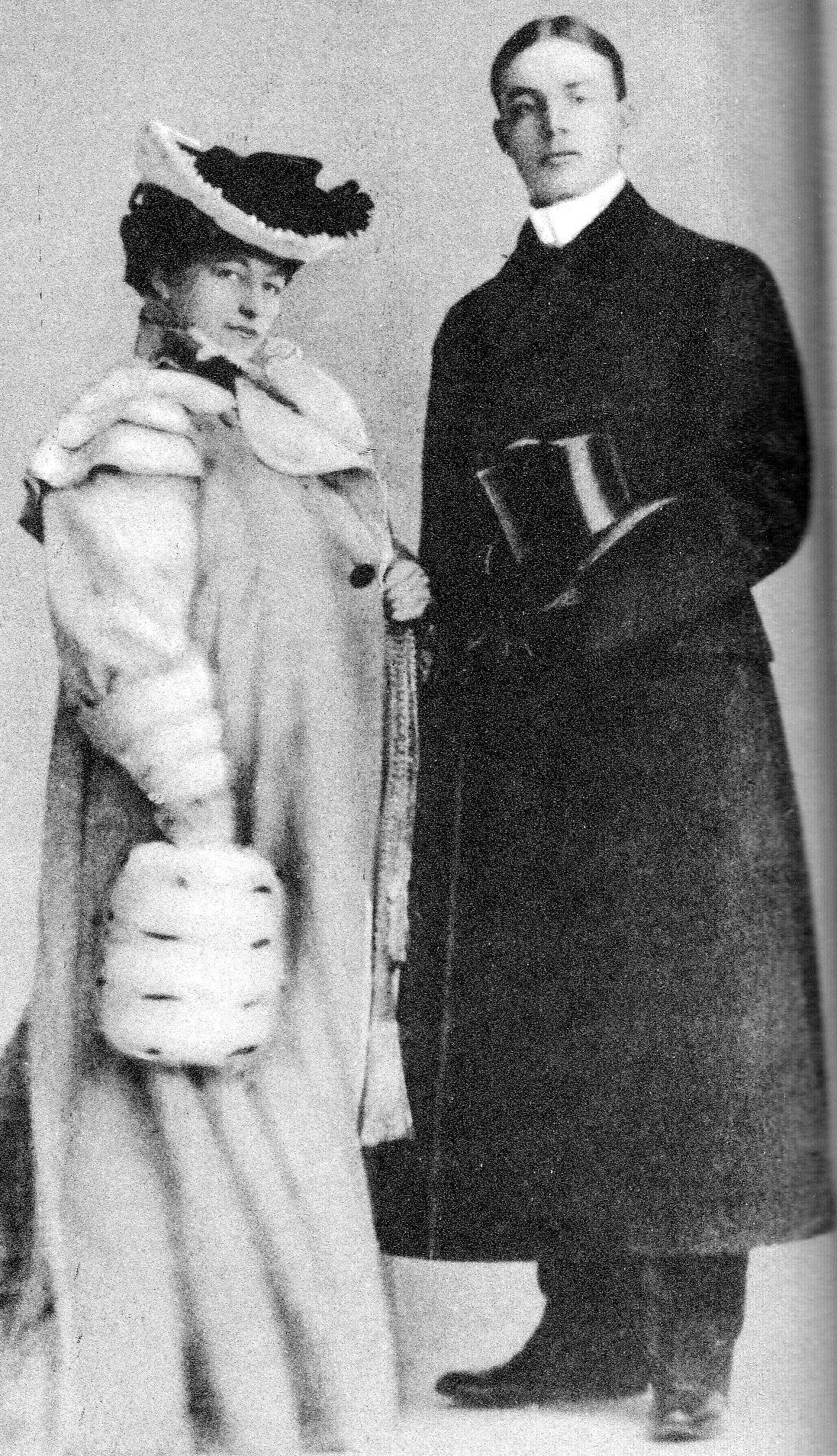
- Leslie and Frank Buck, c. 1901
- Born: Lillian West; October 11, 1855; West Burlington, Iowa, U.S.
- Died: July 3, 1939 (aged 83); Chicago, Illinois, U.S.
- Occupations: Singer; actress; drama critic
- Years active: 1879–1930
- Spouses: Harry Brown (m. 1881; div. 1889) Frank Buck (m. 1901; div. 1913)

Lillian West (October 11, 1855 – July 3, 1939), better known by the pen name Amy Leslie, was an American actress, opera singer, and drama critic.

== Early years ==
West was born in West Burlington, Iowa. She studied at the Conservatory of Vocal Music, St Mary's Academy, Notre Dame, Indiana, graduating in 1874. After more study in Europe and at the Chicago Conservatory of Music, billed as "Lillie West" she became a singer in operettas.

== Journalism ==
In 1890, she began contributing to the Chicago Daily News, signing her stories as Amy Leslie, and became the drama critic for the paper. She was one of the few women drama critics of her time, the only one in Chicago, and came to know and write of the stars of the day. She retired in 1930.

- Annie Oakley: One of Leslie's favorites, "a plain, kindly little woman" who talked "with broad, clear gentleness" of the farmlands where she had grown up. Annie lived as "one of the most retired, modest, commonplace sons of life—that is, when she wasn't hunting or setting target and trap records."
- Sarah Bernhardt: inclined "to filmy gowns, half lace, half vapory silk," which kept her "in a seductive shiver." The closest Bernhardt got to the wilds that Annie Oakley loved were the costly furs she wore, "sometimes with hideous little heads snarling from the edges."
- Lillian Russell: a professional beauty, a stunning woman compared to Annie Oakley. For more than thirty years Russell starred in one operetta or musical show after another, bedizened always "as one of the most beautiful women in the world." While Leslie found Lillian, like Annie, "simple as a schoolgirl," Annie Oakley never would be "watched and petted" in the same way as Lillian Russell.
- Lillie Langtry: "rich, well-born, and of exquisite refinement." Langtry loved roses and had hundreds of them sent over every day from her famous rose nursery at Kentford. Annie Oakley never would be so extravagant.

== Personal life ==
While playing Fiametta in La mascotte she was married to Harry Brown, an opera singer, who abandoned her. Their son, Francis Albert, died of diphtheria in 1889. After obtaining a divorce from Brown, Leslie was the mistress of Stephen Crane and lived with him in New York in a house at 121 West 27th Street. In 1901, the 46-year-old Leslie married 17-year-old Frank Buck, who was at the time a captain of bellboys at the Virginia Hotel in Chicago who was 29 years her junior, where she was living. Buck described her as "a small woman, plump, with keenly intelligent eyes, the most beautifully white teeth I have ever seen and a red, laughing mouth", adding that she was "always good-natured". In 1913 Leslie and Buck divorced.

== Final days ==
Suffering from diffuse arteriosclerosis and a brain tumor, Leslie died in her home in Chicago's Parkway Hotel. Her remains were cremated.

== Sources ==
- Kasper, Shirl (2000). Annie Oakley. University of Oklahoma Press. ISBN 978-0-8061-5607-1. OCLC 947222822.

== Bibliography ==
- Amy Leslie. Some players: personal sketches. Herbert S. Stone & Co. Chicago 1891.
- Amy Leslie. Amy Leslie at the Fair. W.B. Conkey, Chicago 1893.
