= Wild Cargo (book) =

Book by Frank Buck

- The original 1932 book cover.
- Author: Frank Buck; Edward Anthony
- Language: English
- Publisher: Simon & Schuster
- Publication date: 1932
- Publication place: United States
- Media type: Print (Hardcover)
- Pages: 244
- Preceded by: Bring 'Em Back Alive
- Followed by: Fang and Claw

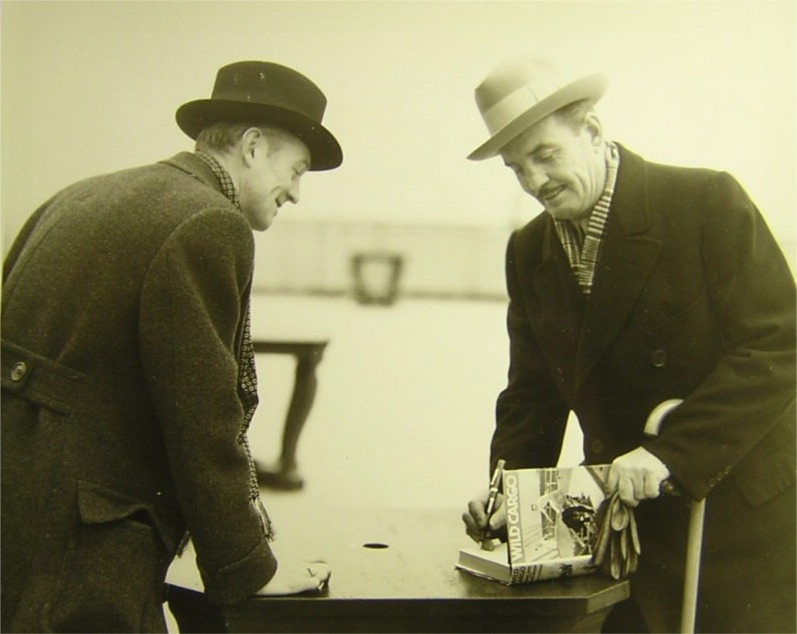
Co-authors Anthony (left) and Buck signing copies of Wild Cargo

Wild Cargo was Frank Buck's second book, a bestseller. Buck, was born on March 17, 1884, in a wagon yard owned by his father at Gainesville, When he was five, his family moved to Dallas. After attending public schools in Dallas, Buck left home at the age of eighteen to take a job handling a trainload of cattle being sent to Chicago. In 1911, he made his first expedition to South America. He eventually also traveled to Malaya, India, Borneo, New Guinea, and Africa. From these and other expeditions, he brought back many exotic species that he sold to zoos and circuses, and he ultimately acquired the nickname "Bring 'Em Back Alive". Buck continued his tales of his adventures capturing exotic animals. Writing with Edward Anthony, Buck related many of his experiences working with and transporting jungle creatures.

== Chapters ==
Buck was a keen observer and student of animal psychology and includes occasional bits of shocking realism, for example in "Killer of Killers" he relates the story of a man-eating tiger that could be trapped by only one kind of bait: human flesh. In "Coiled Lightning" he describes an encounter with a hungry python. In "Spitting Cobra" he tells of a painful meeting with one of the most unpleasant snakes in the world. In "The Patsy" Buck tells the story of a young female elephant who had nothing but bad luck; in "Black Fury" of a leopard who escaped from his cage on shipboard; and in "Terrible Tusks" of a tremendous conflict, witnessed by his native assistant, between two bull elephants contending for the mastery of a herd of females. "A Bear in Time" is the story of a destructive honey bear that Buck used to rid himself of a bore, who had threatened to move into his house. "Animal Magic" describes native medicines: tigers' gall bladders, hairs from elephants' tails and leopards' shoulder bones. "Striped Demon," the final chapter, is the thrilling story of an attack on Buck by a tiger he is trying to film.

== Critical reception ==
"Enough legitimate action and suspense to make a dozen average jungle motion picture films"

== Film ==
Following the example of Merian C. Cooper and Ernest B. Schoedsack's documentary Chang: A Drama of the Wilderness (1927), a film version of Bring 'Em Back Alive was made two years later, released by RKO Pictures. Pushing 50, Buck appeared as himself and became an overnight film celebrity. When he released his second travel journal, Wild Cargo, in 1932, a film version also entitled Wild Cargo followed quickly thereafter.
