= Bring 'Em Back Alive (book) =

Book by Frank Buck

Bring ‘Em Back Alive
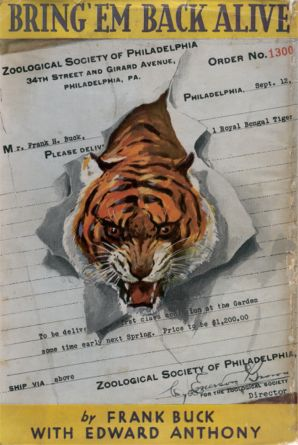
- first edition cover (1930), illustration by Kurt Wiese
- Author: Frank Buck; Edward Anthony
- Language: English
- Publisher: Simon & Schuster
- Publication date: 1930
- Publication place: United States
- Media type: Print (Hardback)
- Pages: 291
- Followed by: Wild Cargo

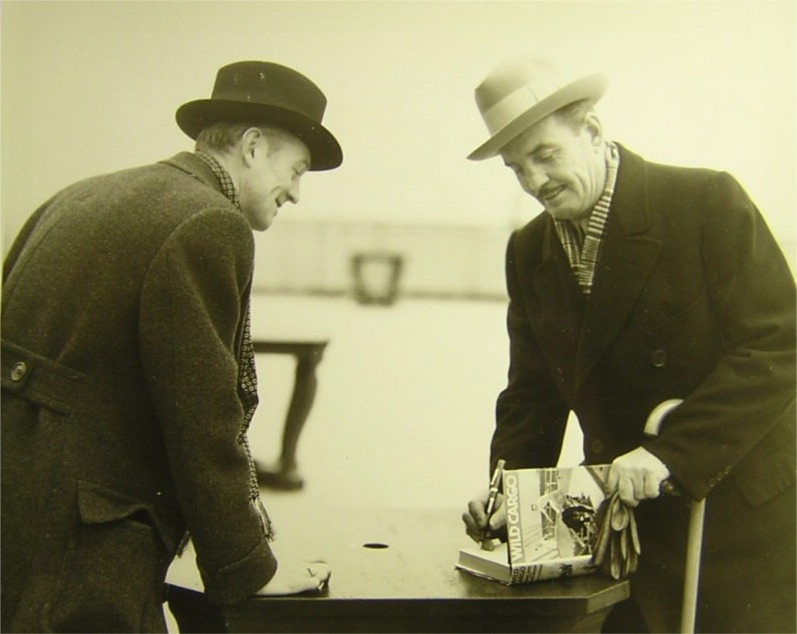
Co-authors Anthony (left) and Buck signing copies of the follow-up book, Wild Cargo (1932)

Bring ‘Em Back Alive is a 1930 book by Frank Buck. His first book, it was a best seller that catapulted him to world fame and was translated into many languages. Buck tells of his adventures capturing exotic animals.

Writing with Edward Anthony, Buck relates some of his most frightening experiences, among them, his battle with an escaped king cobra. This venomous snake is the only jungle animal, Buck says, that has no fear of either man or beast. "Nowhere in the world is there an animal or reptile that can quite match its unfailing determination to wipe out anything that crosses its path. This lust to kill invests the king cobra with a quality of fiendishness that puts it in a class by itself, almost making it a jungle synonym for death."

When the escaped king cobra confronted him, Buck wrote, for an instant, mind and body were numb. He stripped off the white duck jacket he wore over his bare skin and as the snake struck he lunged forward, threw himself with the coat in front of him upon it and hit the ground with a bang, with the cobra, trapped in the jacket under him.

Buck describes many other fearsome encounters. A tapir he was trying to medicate made a sudden terrific charge, hitting him in the stomach with its head and knocking him down. Then the enraged beast jumped on him, pounded him with its hind legs, and dragged him around its pen. The tapir was trying to rip off Buck’s face with its huge jaws and powerful teeth when Buck's native helpers came running to his rescue. One of them shoved a two-by-four plank down the animal's throat, allowing Buck to escape.

“The book can be recommended to anybody who likes being made to sit on the edge of his chair and gasp for breath as his eyes eat up the print to see what happens next,” wrote the New York Times Book Review.

War correspondent Floyd Gibbons suggested to Buck that he write a book about his experiences. Mutual friends introduced Buck to George T. Bye, a New York literary agent, who represented Buck in the publication of Bring 'Em Back Alive and Buck's subsequent books.

In 2000, Steven Lehrer published a new collection of these stories in Bring 'Em Back Alive: The Best of Frank Buck.

== See also ==
- Bring 'Em Back Alive - 1932 film adaptation
- Bring 'Em Back Alive - 1982-3 television series
- Bring 'Em Back Alive: The Best of Frank Buck - 2000 compilation
