= Ferrin Fraser =

American dramatist (1903–1969)

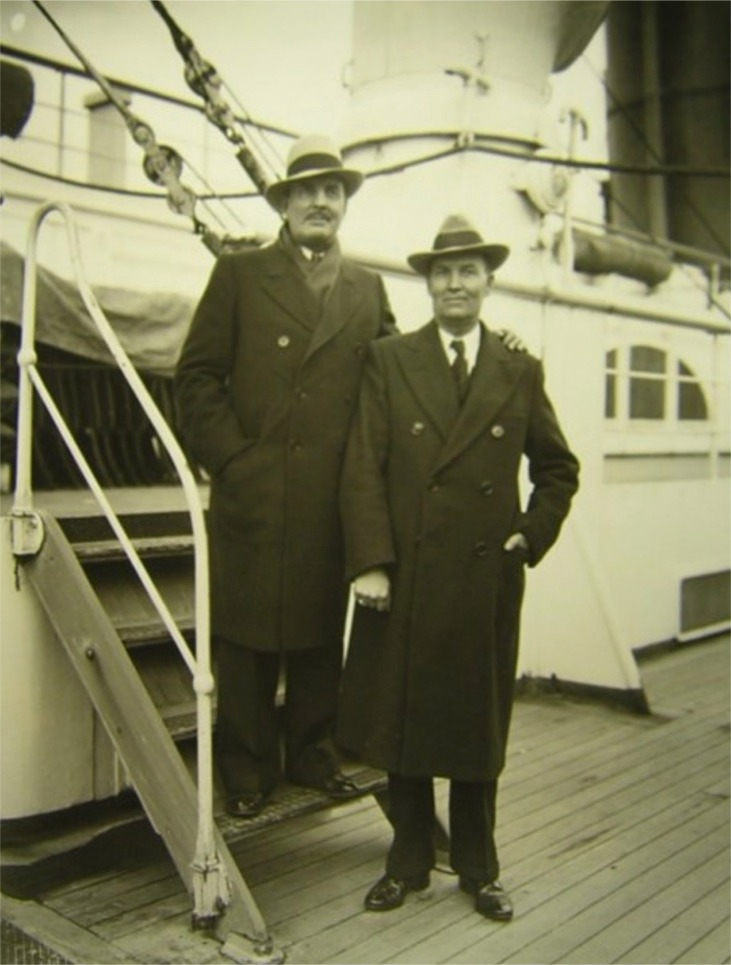
- Fraser (right) with Frank Buck, c. 1940
- Born: May 11, 1903
- Died: April 1, 1969 (aged 65); Lockport, New York, US
- Occupations: writer, radio dramatist
- Known for: collaboration with Frank Buck
- Spouse: Beatrice Ryan (m. 1930)

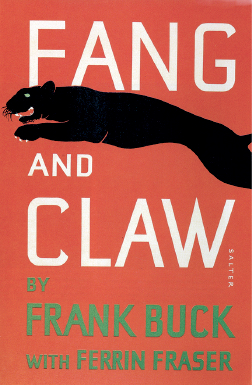
Original cover of Fang and Claw (1935) with a poster-like design by George Salter.

Ferrin Fraser (May 11, 1903 – April 1, 1969) was an American radio scriptwriter and short story author who collaborated with Frank Buck on radio scripts and five books.

== Education and early career ==
Ferrin Fraser was the son of Louis F. Fraser and Martha Fraser. Louis F. Fraser was secretary-treasurer of the Ferrin & Fraser Coal Company in Lockport, New York. Ferrin Fraser's older brother, Carl E. Fraser, born November 25, 1896, became a coal salesman. A member of the Lockport High School Glee Club and the Lockport High School basketball team (1922), Ferrin Fraser was in the Columbia University class of 1927 but did not graduate. His first successful work for radio was "A Piece of String," adapted from the Guy de Maupassant short story. The drama premiered on New York's WABC at 9pm on May 28, 1933. Fraser's books included Lovely ladies: Being the Love Affairs of Ten Women in the Life of a Young Man (1927); The Screaming Portrait (1928); If I Could Fly (1929); and The Passionate Angel (1930).

== Collaboration with Frank Buck ==
Fraser was co-author of five books with Frank Buck:

- Fang and Claw (1935).
- Novel, Tim Thompson in the Jungle (1935).
- On Jungle Trails (1936), for many years a sixth grade reader in the Texas public schools.
- Buck's autobiography, All In A Lifetime (1941).
- Illustrated children's book, Jungle Animals (1945).

== Radio, movies and television ==
Fraser wrote the scripts for Frank Buck's first radio programs, when Buck replaced Amos 'n Andy's Freeman Gosden and Charles Correll during their eight-week vacation during 1934.

During the 1930s and 1940s, Fraser was a radio scriptwriter, notably for Little Orphan Annie. Dramatic and thriller programs with scripts by Fraser include Suspense, Lights Out and Nick Carter, Master Detective. Fraser also wrote the script for the Joan Lowell movie Adventure Girl, and wrote for television during the 1950s.

== Magazines and children's books ==
Fraser was the author of more than 500 short stories for magazines, including Argosy, Collier's, Mystery, Real Detective Tales & Mystery Stories and Redbook. Ferrin and his wife Beatrice Fraser published Bennie, the Bear Who Grew Too Fast (1956), a musical nonsense tale that teaches the names of various stringed instruments and the differences in their sizes and sounds, Arturo and Mr. Bang (1963) and other children's music books.

== Family and later life ==
Wife Beatrice Ryan Fraser, an author, composer and church musician, was a graduate of the Eastman School of Music in Rochester and was a featured organist at the Eastman Theater and an organist with the Rochester Philharmonic. She studied in Paris with Nadia Boulanger and Marcel Dupré.
