= Wilding Picture Productions =

Film production company

Wilding Picture Productions, Inc. (also known as Wilding Studios or Wilding) was a major supplier of audio-visual communications services, involved primarily in the production and distribution of motion pictures, slidefilms, TV commercials, and business shows. It produced industrial films for many corporations on a wide range of subjects, from expounding proper use of the company's products to productivity. During World War II, it was the main supplier of war-related films for the United States Armed Forces.

== History ==
=== 1914–1936: Detroit period ===
The company was founded in Detroit by Norman Wilding (1892–1947), in 1914.

=== 1937–1966: Chicago Essanay Studio period ===
In 1937, Wilding moved into the Essanay Building in Chicago, once owned by Essanay Film Manufacturing Company. Over the next few decades, Wilding became one of the country's biggest producers of industrial films. At its peak, the company owned studios in Chicago, Detroit and New York. In 1958, Wilding produced around 100 to 125 major business films, at a total cost of about 130 million dollars. Its customers included Ford, Chrysler, Goodyear, General Electric, U.S. Steel, Alcoa, and Amoco.

During the Second World War, Wilding produced many films for the US Armed Services. These included training films such as Combat Fatigue: Insomnia (1945), an educational film used to teach soldiers how to overcome insomnia; and product promotion films such as Heritage for Victory (ca.1940s), and Army on Wheels (1940), which concentrated on vehicles and technologies used in World War II.

=== 1967–Now: Closure ===
In 1967, Wilding was acquired by local Chicago projector manufacturer Bell & Howell, which ultimately closed Wilding's Chicago unit in 1972. Bell & Howell donated the real estate to Ch. 11, which in turn sold the property. Wilding's exhibits division and creative operations for the John Deere account remained in business in downtown Chicago until 1985.

Wilding was sold to Maritz, LLC on January 4, 1981. Maritz merged Wilding with their existing film and events production subsidiary, Communico, and named the new company Maritz Communications. Wilding's heavily unionized labor force did not blend well with Maritz's non-union culture, and over the subsequent five years, Maritz sold or closed down several Wilding operating units. These included event staging equipment rental, film editing, sound studios and major exhibit production.

Maritz Communications closed in 1992, and film and events clients were serviced by Maritz, LLC. In 1997, Maritz, LLC spun-off video production operations to Visiontracks, and meetings and events to EventSource. Maritz, LLC kept a creative group employed until 2009, when all media and event operations were closed.

== Partial filmography ==
Film title	Year	Length	Color/B&W	Sponsor	Director	Notes								
Behind the Scenes	undated, probably early 1930s	10:19 min	B&W	Wilding Picture Productions	J. Cullen Landis	Gag reel of bloopers and flubs collected from various Wilding shoots. Contains both racist stereotypes and risqué moments.								
Wheels Across Africa	ca. 1937	50 min	B&W	Dodge Division, Chrysler Corporation		Account of Armand Denis and Leila Roosevelt's expedition across Africa in Dodge automobiles. Wheels Across Africa is both an African travelogue and demonstration of the Dodge vehicle's capacity to perform under "terrific punishment."								
Blame It on Love	1940	feature-length	B&W	Edison General Electric Appliance Company	Wallace Fox	The plot involves a wealthy manufacturing heir who elopes with a nightclub singer who can't cook. When the couple breaks up, the singer goes to cooking school, learns how to use Hotpoint appliances, and prepares the perfect meal for her estranged husband. They reunite and the accomplished cook earns the respect of her formerly unsupportive in-laws. The film includes scenes of a television program promoting the Hotpoint electric range.								
Land of the Free	1940	30 min	B&W	Dodge Division, Chrysler Corporation		Isolationist film arguing that America can take care of itself. Extolling the country's prosperity, power, and self-sufficiency, Land of the Free intersperses historical re-creations with images of American plenty—the prolific countryside, productive workers, World's Fairs, and consumer goods. The film was among current releases singled out by Business Screen as reinforcing the "wave of public sentiment for 'America First.'"								
This Amazing America	1941	20 min	Color	Greyhound Lines		In the narrative a history professor beats a Southern woman in a radio quiz show, but both win cross-country bus tickets. Aboard the Greyhound, the professor teaches the woman about America and they fall in love. The tour ends at Niagara Falls. Educational Film Catalog noted that "the advertising is so much a part of the story that it is almost unnoticeable."								
Unfinished Rainbows	1941	42 min	Color	Aluminum Company of America	Jean Yarborough	Big-budget film linking the history of aluminum products with Alcoa's quest to find new and better ways to use the element for the good of humankind								
Sightseeing at Home	1943	15 min	B&W	General Electric Company	J.M. Constable	Film promoting television at a time when the medium was still in limited use. It shows how television works and tours GE's flagship station, WRGB, in Schenectady, New York.								
The Ship Is Ours	1943	19 min	B&W	United States Navy	Bureau of Navy Personnel	The film narration and acting explain dos and don'ts of watchstanding.								
A Letter from America	1948	32 min	B&W	Goodyear Tire & Rubber Company	Lewis D. Collins	The story begins with a letter, written by an immigrant worker to his family behind the Iron Curtain, that describes the American way of life and the opportunities provided by his employer, Goodyear. Flashbacks show the worker's arrival in America, his experience with the American democratic system, and his success at Goodyear. He explains that because many workers are also corporate shareholders, there is no longer a gap between capital and labor.								
Daily Double	1948	22 min	B&W	Wine Advisory Board	Les Goodwins	Film promoting the marketing of American wines at restaurants	~	Last Date	1950	19 min	B&W	Lumbermens Mutual Casualty Company	Lewis D. Collins	The drama centers on a reckless driver, who together with his girlfriend, takes one risk too many. Like other safety films made for teenagers, Last Date implies that death is preferable to disfigurement. The dramatic accident sequence and surprise ending have often been emulated by other films targeting the same audience
Big Idea	1951	53 min	B&W	Swift & Company	Edward M. Grabill	A woman reporter from an Iron Curtain country and an American newspaperman, a "fellow traveler," tour a Swift plant and visit workers' homes. Together they come to realize that capitalism is the system that provides the greatest degree of worker freedom.								
Midwest Holiday	1952	27 min	Color	Standard Oil Company of Indiana		Midwest Holiday interweaves a trailer adventure through 10 states, a boy-meets-girl narrative, and the broader themes of America's freedom of the road and Manifest Destiny								
Memo to Mars	1954	24 min	Color	U.S. Rubber Company		A Martian automaker sends his district manager to the United States to scout out the market for the "convertible Jet-16." The visitor determines that Martian cars are too advanced for the congested, poorly maintained roads found on Earth. The only hope, the Martian concludes, is for Americans to insist on improving their highways.								
Production 5118	1955	30 min	Color	Champion Paper & Fibre Company	Kirby Grant	A corporate executive fails to communicate effectively at work and at home, and dramatized tableaux demonstrate the Power for Progress 76 unfortunate results.								
1104 Sutton Road	1958	28 min	Color	Champion Paper and Fibre Company		In the story a dissatisfied factory worker imagines what it would be like to become a company foreman or the company president. The worker comes to learn that every employee, regardless of position, must be productive to succeed. Through this parable, 1104 Sutton Road argues that improving personal relations and communications in the workplace increases productivity and makes each employee a better person.								
Why Braceros?	1962	19 min	B&W	Council of California Growers		Film explaining the benefits of the bracero program, originally initiated by the United States in 1942 to alleviate the World War II labor shortage. Attempting to answer public concerns over immigrant labor, the film shows the productive contribution of Mexican guest workers to California's farming, ranching, and food processing industries								
