= Jungle Cavalcade =

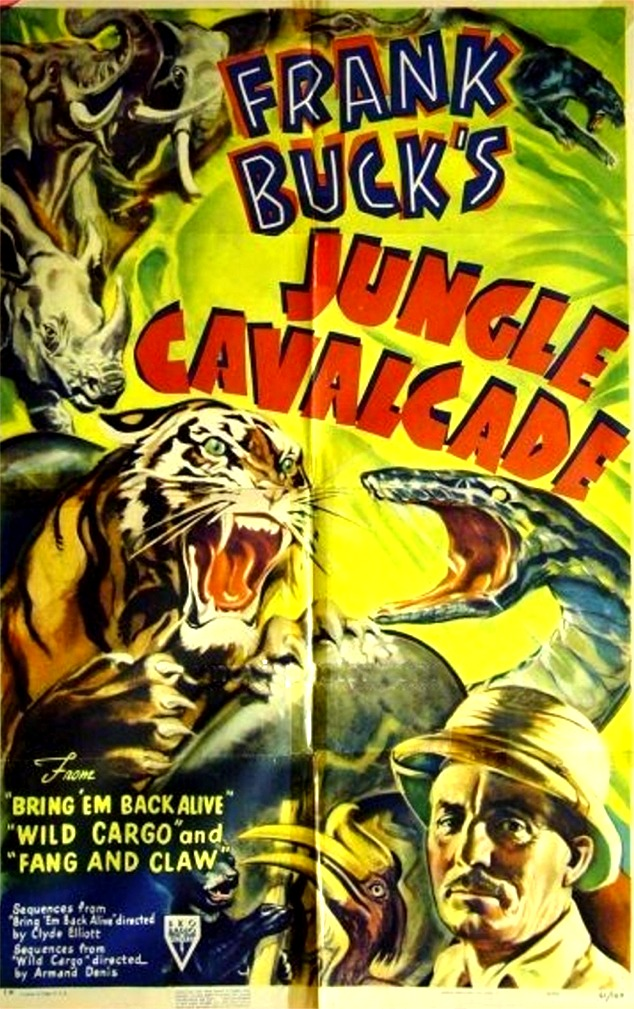
- Theatrical poster
- Directed by: Armand Denis, Clyde E. Elliott, Frank Buck
- Written by: Phil Reisman, Jr.
- Produced by: Walton C. Ament
- Starring: Frank Buck
- Cinematography: Leroy G. Phelps, Nicholas Cavaliere, Carl Berger, Harry E. Squire
- Edited by: Jay Bonafield
- Music by: Nathaniel Shilkret, Herman Fuchs
- Distributed by: RKO
- Release date: June 27, 1941
- Running time: 75-76 minutes
- Country: United States
- Language: English

Jungle Cavalcade is a compilation of footage from Frank Buck’s first three films depicting his adventures capturing animals for the world's zoos.

== Scenes ==
Among the scenes in the film:

- In the Sumatran jungle, Buck builds a trap baited with a durian fruit to capture a giant orangutan for a St. Louis zoo.
- When he sees a baby elephant pursued by a tiger, Buck shoots the tiger and captures the elephant.
- Buck captures a rare spotted leopard by shooting off the tree limb supporting the cat
- After building a four-acre corral, Buck stampedes a herd of elephants into it and then singles out individual elephants to send to zoos.

== Release ==
The RKO Palace Theater built a 10 ft (3.0 m) tall papier-mâché elephant for the premiere.
