= Nicholas Cavaliere =

American cinematographer

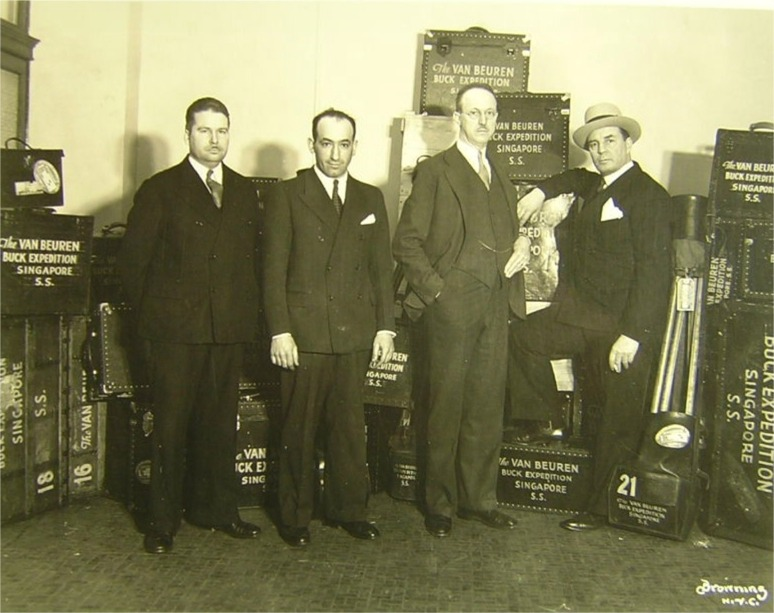
- Left to right: Cavaliere, Carl Berger, director Clyde E. Elliott, and star Frank Buck ready to leave for the far east to film Bring 'Em Back Alive c.1932
- Born: July 23, 1899; North Branford, New Haven, Connecticut
- Died: January 10, 1995 (aged 95); North Branford, New Haven, Connecticut
- Occupation: Cinematographer
- Known for: Work with Frank Buck

Nicholas Cavaliere (July 23, 1899, in North Branford, New Haven, Connecticut – January 10, 1995, in North Branford, New Haven, Connecticut) was a cinematographer who filmed Frank Buck’s films Bring 'Em Back Alive (1932), Wild Cargo (1934), and Fang and Claw (1935).

== Early years ==
In 1927, when Leroy G. Phelps opened his industrial motion picture laboratory in New Haven, he engaged Cavaliere to do the developing and printing. This lasted about a year. Then Cavaliere launched himself upon a career as a free-lance, out-of-doors cameraman. He was so good that he soon became a staff photographer for Pathé Revue.

== Work with Frank Buck ==
Van Beuren Studios hired Cavaliere in 1932 to photograph Bring 'Em Back Alive with Frank Buck. Early in 1933, Buck was making plans for another trip into southern Asia, where he hoped to fill a stack of orders from circuses and zoos and make a new movie, Wild Cargo (1934). He asked Cavaliere to suggest a second cameraman for the expedition. Cavaliere named Leroy G. Phelps and Phelps readily accepted.

A third film, Fang and Claw (1935), took nine months to make. Cavaliere came off without a scratch, but a 27-foot-long (8.2 m) python, which cameraman Harry E. Squire was helping Buck to force into a box, left a 4-inch (100 mm) wound on Squire’s right arm. Some of the scenes Cavaliere had filmed in the first three movies were used in Jungle Cavalcade (1941).
