= Untamed World =

- Genre: Nature; Documentary
- Narrated by: Phil Carey, Alan Small
- Country of origin: Canada
- Original language: English
- No. of series: 8

Original release
- Network: CTV Television Network
- Release: 15 September 1968 – 19 September 1976

Untamed World is a television wildlife documentary series narrated by Phil Carey and Alan Small, originally broadcast from 1968 to 1976. It is remembered by many for its distinctive and interesting theme music. Untamed World is sometimes confused with another wildlife show from the same era, Wild Kingdom.

== Background ==
The show was originally broadcast on CTV and was changed to Untamed Frontier for a short time due to legal issues. Phil Carey was the narrator for the show from 1968 to 1975. Alan Small had been involved with the show from the beginning. He was also a narrator for the show and was previously with CFRB. It was produced by Lawrence E. Neiman and Bud Weiser. Episodes covered different locations around the world, including focusing on flora and fauna.

Phil Carey died on 7 February 2009, aged 83.

== Music ==
The theme music for the show was provided by Mort Garson.

== Episodes ==
=== Series 1 (1968–69) ===
No.	Title	Original release date
1	"The New Generation"	15 September 1968
The debut episode features the beginning of life for an egret and a crocodile, the birth of a gazelle, a zebra's first hours and a lioness with three cubs. Narrated by Phil Carey.
2	"Animal Rodeo"	22 September 1968
Conservationists round up and transport animals to game preserves. Filmed by Armand Denis. Narrated by Phil Carey.
3	"People of the Water"	29 September 1968
People living and working on water from Japan, Lake Biwa, Columbia, Hong Kong and Thailand.
4	"World of Insects"	6 October 1968
Violence and splendor in the world of insects including butterflies and ants. Narrated by Phil Carey.
5	"Search for Gertie"	13 October 1968
Armand and Michaela Denis travel thousands of miles across Maasai Amboseli Game Reserve in search of Gertie, a rhinoceros with a 50-inch horn.
6	"The World of Birds"	20 October 1968
A study of birds, nature's most adaptable creatures.
7	"Morocco"	27 October 1968
The desert kingdom of contrasting faces. A look at the old and the new way of life, narrated by Armand Denis.
8	"Predators and Scavengers"	3 November 1968
A lion pride is followed by scavenging vultures, hyenas and jackals
9	"Animals that Work for Man"	10 November 1968
In Japan, the fishermen use cormorants to help them catch fish; in Thailand, the elephant helps man work in the teak forests.
10	"South American Tribes"	17 November 1968
Filmed by Armand Denis; this program visits some of the Indian tribes of South America, including the Cunas, once part of the Inca Empire around Machu Picchu, who live in the islands of vegetation in Lake Titicaca of Peru.
11	"Water Rescue"	24 November 1968
Rescuing African wildlife from flooding caused by construction of the Kariba River Dam.
12	"People of Africa"	8 December 1968
13	"American Wilderness"	15 December 1968
Wildlife in Yellowstone, Everglades and Grand Canyon National Parks.
14	"Dragons"	22 December 1968
An exploration of reptiles, including pythons. baby crocodiles and venomous snakes.
15	"Japan"	29 December 1968
Rituals of battle and traditional social graces of Japan.
16	"Pygmies"	5 January 1969
A look at Mbutu Pygmies, who live in the Ituri Rain Forest of Africa. Films include an elephant hunt and construction of a temporary village.
17	"Armand and Micheala and the Animals"	12 January 1969
A visit to the house of Armand and Michaela Denis in Nairobi, Kenya, where they have spent 20 years filming African wildlife.
18	"Rituals of Man"	19 January 1969
Religious ceremonies around the world. Sherpa spirit dancers, Hindu funeral rites, and tribal dances from Africa and South America.
19	"Thailand"	26 January 1969
Ancient traditions and methods of work in a country that is already hurrying to develop in modern times. An interesting study. Filmed outside of Bangkok.
20	"Water and Life"	2 February 1969
The impacts of drought on animals in the plains of East Africa, including Elephants migrating hundreds of miles to find water. Narrated by Phil Carey.
21	"A Day in the Parks"	16 February 1969
The national parks of Africa.
22	"Underwater, Part One"	2 March 1969
A look at the underwater world of Grand Bahama Island in the Caribbean, and films made from the University of Miami research ship, Pillsbury.
23	"Underwater, Part Two"	9 March 1969
The second part looks at the Horseshoe Crab, Decorator Crab, and Hermit Crab. There are also visits to a sea lion colony and the Miami Seaquarium.
24	"Man and Environment"	23 March 1969
A look at the Botswana people of the Kalahari desert; Eskimos; and a visit to an Israeli kibbutz; Andenese Arabs build skyscrapers out of mud.

=== Series 2 (1969–70) ===
No. in series	Title	Original release date
1	"Waterhole"	21 September 1969
Herbivores and carnivores in Africa. Also, the way of life and social patterns of baboons.
2	"Operation Gwamba"	28 September 1969
Thousands of animals are trapped when a dam is constructed flooding miles of land in South America.
3	"Animal Behaviour"	5 October 1969
Armand and Michaela Denis explore the myths and mysteries of African animals behavior and why they look and act the way they do.
4	"Bats, Birds and Bigger Beasts"	26 October 1969
African wildlife showing the life habits of Ghost Crabs, rhinoceros, flying foxes and scavengers. Also, the mating habits of Whydah Birds and Crowned Cranes are shown.
5	"The People of Hong Kong"	2 November 1969
6	"Birds. Beasts and Breathing Fish"	9 November 1969
Bizarre creatures called zebroids, lungfish, mole rats, and scorpions are studied.
7	"Elephants – The Noble Beast"	16 November 1969
The history of the elephant, dating back 23 million years.
8	"Insects ... A Success Story"	7 December 1969
Shows locusts, praying mantis and a termite colony.
9	"Balance of Nature"	11 January 1970
The role of animals in the checks and balances of ecosystems.
10	"Nomads of Africa"	25 January 1970
Masai, Bushmen and Pygmies.
11	"Creatures of the Water"	1 February 1970
Pelicans, hippotami, turtles, crocodiles and frogs.
12	"Gazelles"	8 February 1970
The life cycle of the gazelle.
13	"Arts and Crafts"	15 February 1970
14	"Day in Africa"	22 February 1970
15	"Birds of a Different Feather"	1 March 1970
TBirds and How They Get Around – The role of body and feathers in helping birds fly and survive on the ground.
16	"Giants"	8 March 1970
Giants of the animal world
17	"The Primates"	15 March 1970
The lifestyles and habits of primates.
18	"Other Cats"	22 March 1970
The similarities and differences of various members of the Cat family.

=== Untamed World Presents The Challenging Sea (Series 1) ===
No. in series	Title	Original release date
1	"The Octopus"	29 March 1970
2	"The Blue Line"	5 April 1970
3	"Cozumel"	12 April 1970
A young Mayan diving among wrecked Spanish galleons searching for treasure.
4	"The Collectors"	19 April 1970
Scientists from Marineland of the Pacific capture a giant sawfish and see elephants mate on Guadalupe Island.
5	"Bora-Bora Paradise"	26 April 1970
6	"The Fighting Billfish"	3 May 1970
A charity billfish tournament where competitors attempt to catch Marlin and Sailfish.
7	"Tropical Fish Hunt"	10 May 1970
Ken Taylor hunts for tropical saltwater fish.
8	"Thunder Boats"	17 May 1970
9	"Sharks of Nicaragua"	24 May 1970
10	"Killer Whale"	31 May 1970
The life cycle of Killer Whales.
11	"Makai Range"	7 June 1970
The Makai Undersea Test Range in Hawaii attempts to establish living quarters under the sea.
12	"Kelp"	28 June 1970
The value of kelp and the need to restore the aquatic plant.
13	"The Grey Whales"	5 July 1970
The migration of Grey Whales from the Bering Sea to Scammon's Lagoon in Baja California and their mating habits.
14	"The World of Oceanography"	12 July 1970
A visit to Scripps Institution of Oceanography at La Jolla, California, which has a fleet of research ships.
15	"Coast Guard Search and Rescue"	19 July 1970
16	"The Aqualung"	26 July 1970
17	"The Fishermen of Hastings"	2 August 1970
18	"The Multi-Hulls"	9 August 1970
Outriggers, catamarans and trimarans.
19	"Surfing"	23 August 1970
The history of surfing and some of the world's greatest surfers at Huntington Beach, California.
20	"A Man and The Sea"	6 September 1970
Explorer John Craig shows films and stills from his underwater adventures; from his first expedition to Baja California in 1934 to the present day.
21	"Smugglers"	13 September 1970
22	"Harvesting the Sea"	20 September 1970

=== Series 3 (1970–71) ===
No. in series	Title	Original release date
1	"Communication"	20 September 1970
A look at the methods animals use to communicate with each other. The program focuses on the frog, the crab, the rattlesnake, the porpoise and the chameleon.
2	"Snakes"	4 April 1971
The habits and habitats of snakes.
3	"Herbivores"	4 October 1970
The vegetarian animals, including giraffes, elephants, zebras and ostriches.
4	"Safari"	11 October 1970
Africa's new style of hunting by camera. Featured animals include a hippopotamus, a crocodile, a leopard and lions.
5	"Lions"	18 October 1970
The predatory habits and social grouping of lions.
6	"Forest Dwellers"	25 October 1970
A look at the self-sustaining community of animal and vegetable life that is a forest.
7	"The Midgets"	1 November 1970
A look at the world of arthropods, including hermit crabs, paper wasps, praying mantis, beetles, spiders and ants.
8	"Asia"	8 November 1970
Traditional life in rural Asia exists near rapid industrialization.
9	"Galapagos: The Sea"	15 November 1970
Sea life around the Galapagos Islands including sea lions, dolphins and boobies.
10	"Galapagos – The Land"	22 November 1970
The evolution of life on the Galapagos Islands and a look at animals, including the finch, the tortoise and the lava lizard.
11	"Antelopes"	6 December 1970
The various defense mechanisms of the African antelope and the threats posed by agriculture.
12	"Birds and How They Get Around"	13 December 1970
13	"Sherpas"	20 December 1970
The Sherpas, the mountain people of the Himalayas.
14	"The Arctic"	27 December 1970
The large variety of plants and animals that survive in the Canadian Arctic.
15	"The Great Barrier Reef"	3 January 1971
One of the world's great natural wonders, the Great Barrier Reef off the northeast coast of Australia is now facing biologists with a distressing phenomenon – the rapid destruction of the reef by a predator starfish that has destroyed one fifth of the reef in eight years.
16	"The Rockies"	10 January 1971
The Rocky Mountains are one of the world's most spectacular mountain ranges. This is a frontier where animals may roam unnoticed by man. Cameras follow animals through the seasonal change from winter to spring.
17	"Water Birds"	17 January 1971
Examined are the over 800 species of birds living around lakes, rivers and oceans, sometimes in colonies that number in the thousands.
18	"Australia Part I"	24 January 1971
The first of a series of four shows devoted to the wildlife and coastal waters of Australia. This week featuring animal forms unique to the continent.
19	"Prairies"	31 January 1971
A look at the North American prairies that once stretched from Alberta to Mexico and from Indiana to the Rockies, now being assimilated into agricultural land. Species featured include the Sharp-tailed Grouse, the Rough-legged Hawk, the Thirteen-lined Ground squirrel and the Canada Goose.
20	"Australia Part II"	7 February 1971
Dealing with the unique wildlife and topography of the continent. The programs shows Koalas and the birth of a Red Kangaroo.
21	"Canadian Parklands"	14 February 1971
The variety of animal life that inhabit Canadian forests and prairies.
22	"Australia Part III"	21 February 1971
With a year-round food supply and warm climate, Australia is home to bizarre and colorful birds.
23	"African Wildlife"	28 February 1971
24	"Cranes"	7 March 1971
Birth, feeding and breeding habits and social behavior of cranes. Six species, including the Japanese and African Crowned Crane, are featured.
25	"American Parks"	14 March 1971
26	"Penguins"	21 March 1971
Penguin species of the world from Antarctica, Australia and South America.

=== Series 4 (1971–72) ===
No. in series	Title	Original release date
1	"The Antarctic"	12 September 1971
Wildlife of Antarctica.
2	"Survival"	19 September 1971
The survival instinct found in animals, including man.
3	"The Everglades Part I"	26 September 1971
The plant and animal life of the Florida Everglades.
4	"Bighorn Sheep"	3 October 1971
Bighorn Sheep living in the Rocky Mountains from Canada to Mexico.
5	"Getting the Job Done"	17 October 1971
Animals who use tools.
6	"Sockeye Salmon"	24 October 1971
The autumn migration of Sockeye Salmon from the Pacific Ocean to the inland gravel beds where they were born.
7	"Everglades Part II"	31 October 1971
Birds of the Florida Everglades, including Anhinga, grebe, heron and an almost extinct kite.
8	"The Jungle"	14 November 1971
9	"Afghanistan"	21 November 1971
A look at the cultural aspect of Afghanistan and a market place that was covered.
10	"The Arctic and Man"	5 December 1971
11	"The Beach"	12 December 1971
12	"The Mangrove Swamp"	26 December 1971
13	"The Farne Island Bird Sanctuary"	19 December 1971
A visit to the Farne Islands off the Northumberland coast of England and one of the world's oldest bird sanctuaries.
14	"Scandinavia"	16 January 1972
15	"Ngorongoro Crater"	23 January 1972
Ngorongoro Crater in Africa is home to wild and domestic animals.
16	"Waterfowl"	30 January 1972
An investigation into the migration of waterfowl and other birds.
17	"A Visit to New Guinea"	6 February 1972
18	"British Columbia"	13 February 1972
19	"Nile"	20 February 1972
20	"Storks"	5 March 1972
21	"African Parks"	12 March 1972
22	"Asia Minor"	19 March 1972
23	"Grebes and Geese"	26 March 1972
Canada Geese and grebes return from migration, perform courtship rituals, build nests and raise their young.

=== Series 5 (1972–73) ===
No. in series	Title	Original release date
1	"Ceremonies of Man Part I"	17 September 1972
Ancient ceremonies and rituals of India.
2	"Ceremonies of Man Part II"	1 October 1972
3	"Kangaroos"	8 October 1972
4	"Pacific Coast"	22 October 1972
5	"New England"	29 October 1972
6	"Marsupials"	5 November 1972
7	"Sahara"	19 November 1972
The Sahara Desert covers a quarter of Africa and is one of the hottest regions on Earth.
8	"Conservation"	26 November 1972
An examination of the efforts being made to save the world's natural resources.
9	"Insects"	3 December 1972
10	"Water"	10 December 1972
The importance of water to life.
11	"Handicrafts"	17 December 1972
The creative skills of man including Persian Carpet weaving, African sculptures, Chinese camphorwood carving and Uru boat construction using reeds in Peru.
12	"Desert"	12 November 1972
Great deserts around the world.

=== Untamed World Presents The Challenging Sea (Series 2) ===
No. in series	Title	Original release date
22	"Silent Savages"	14 January 1973
23	"Tugboat"	21 January 1973
24	"Great Barrier Reef"	23 January 1973
26	"Life at Sea World"	22 July 1973

=== Series 6 (1973–74) ===
No. in series	Title	Original release date
1	"Geese"	16 September 1973
Konrad Lorenz and his work with Grey Geese.
2	"Nuba"	13 January 1974
The Masaquin Hill tribes, including the Nuba, of southern Sudan.
3	"Pets"	14 October 1974
4	"Elephants"	21 October 1973
Africa is experiencing ecological problems resulting from an overabundance of Elephants. This program looks at their family structure, eating and migratory habits.
5	"Underwater"	4 November 1973
The Coral Sea.
6	"Waika"	18 November 1973
The Waika who live in the Orinoco River in Venezuela.
7	"Color"	2 December 1973
The importance of color in the animal world.
8	"Dogon"	20 December 1973
9	"Birds"	30 December 1973
10	"Wheels in Africa"	13 January 1974
A truck safari from the Nile River to the heart of Africa.
11	"Nuguria"	10 February 1974
Life on Nuguria Lagoon in the South Pacific.
12	"Guillemots"	7 July 1974
13	"Carnivores"	4 August 1974
Nature's most efficient killers – the carnivores.

=== Series 7 (1974–75) ===
No. in series	Title	Original release date
1	"Makiritare"	15 September 1974
The Maquiritare people of the Orinoco River in South America.
2	"Kalahari"	22 September 1974
The culture and language of the people of the Kalahari in Africa.
TBA	N/A	29 September 1974
3	"Chimpanzees I"	6 October 1974
Our Ancestors: The Chimps.
4	TBA	13 October 1974
Animal courtship and mating.
5	"Yanomama"	20 October 1974
Yanomama – the jungles of Southern Venezuela.
3	"Methods"	27 October 1974
3	"Chimpanzees II"	10 November 1974
6	"Guinea"	8 December 1974
Remote northwest Guinea.
7	"Water Birds"	5 January 1975
Birds of European deltas.
8	TBA	19 January 1975
Rare predatory birds and animals of Europe.
9	"Polar Bears"	26 January 1975
Tagging and examining polar bears in Norway.
10	"South America"	2 February 1975
Diverse habitats of South America.
11	"Orissa Domb"	9 February 1975
The Dombs, an isolated group of Hindu outcasts in India.
12	"Dogon II"	16 February 1975
The Dogon of the Niger River Basin in West Africa.
N/A	"Serengeti"	23 February 1975
Serengeti National Park.
13	"Iceland"	2 March 1975
Iceland, land of contrasts.
14	"Madagascar Island"	9 March 1975
Animals of Madagascar.
15	"Yugoslavia"	23 March 1975
Plitzwitze National Park in the mountains of Yugoslavia.
16	"Africa's Great Rift Valley"	6 April 1975
Wildlife in the Great Rift Valley in Africa's core.
17	"South America II"	20 April 1975
Plants, birds & animals of South America, including the Galapagos Islands.
N/A	"India"	18 May 1975
Animals of India, including the rare Indian Rhinoceros.
TBA	N/A	25 May 1975
18	"Poland"	22 June 1975
A wildlife preserve in eastern Poland.
19	"The Alps"	10 August 1975
Wildlife preservation in the Alps.
N/A	"Sea Islands"	24 August 1975
Animals on rocky North Atlantic islands.

=== Series 8 (1975–76) ===
No. in series	Title	Original release date
1	"Mating Dances"	28 September 1975
Mating dances in birds.
2	"Antarctica I"	5 October 1975
Penguins in the Antarctic region.
3	"Rocky Mountains"	12 October 1975
Animals of the Rockies.
TBA	"Cordillera"	2 November 1975
4	"Malaysia"	9 November 1975
Plant and animals of the Malaysian rain forest.
TBA	"Tropical Marshes"	28 November 1975
TBA	"Island Survivors"	7 December 1975
As more than a thousand animal species face extinction, ecosystems became unstable and impact humans.
TBA	"Nakuru"	14 December 1975
Lake Nakuru in east Africa is one of the last great bird sanctuaries.
TBA	"Pachyderms"	21 December 1975
TBA	"Continental Survivors"	28 December 1975
TBA	"Birds of Prey"	18 January 1975
The effects of DDT and other chemicals on birds of prey in Europe and North America.
TBA	"African Plains"	25 January 1976
Animals of the savanna of southeast Africa.
TBA	TBA	1 February 1976
Unusual animals of Australia.
TBA	TBA	15 February 1976
Wildlife and people of Africa.
TBA	"Seychelles"	4 April 1976
Life in the Indian Ocean around the Seychelles Islands.
TBA	"Indian Ocean"	4 April 1976
Life in the Indian Ocean around the Seychelles Islands.
TBA	"African Eagles"	11 April 1976
Eagles in East African savannas.
TBA	"Kenya Safari"	18 April 1976
N/A	"Canadian Marsh"	11 July 1976
Conservation areas in the Great Lakes region of Canada.
TBA	"Snow Geese"	18 July 1976
N/A	"Elba"	1 August 1976
Invertebrates of the Mediterranean Sea.
TBA	N/A	15 August 1976
TBA	N/A	22 August 1976
TBA	"'Puffins"	29 August 1976
TBA	"Eleonora Falcon"	12 September 1976
Eleonora's falcon of the Green Islands in the Aegean Sea.
TBA	"Marmots"	19 September 1976
Life cycle of Marmots in the Bavarian Alps.
