= Alive in the Deep =

1941 film

- Directed by: Stacy Woodard; Horace Woodard
- Release date: May 7, 1941
- Running time: 25 minutes
- Country: United States
- Language: English

Alive in the Deep is a 1941 American short documentary film directed by Stacy Woodard and Horace Woodard. It was nominated for an Academy Award at the 14th Academy Awards for Best Short Subject (Two-Reel).
