= Below the Sahara =

1953 American documentary film about Africa

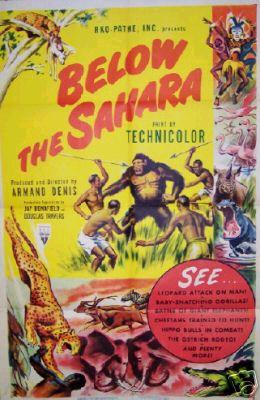
- Poster for the film
- Directed by: Armand Denis
- Written by: Jerome Brondfield; Burton Benjamin
- Produced by: Armand Denis
- Starring: Armand Denis; Michaela Denis; Carr Hartley
- Narrated by: Armand Denis
- Cinematography: Tom Stobart; Phil Schultz; Robert Carmet; Eric White
- Edited by: David Cooper
- Music by: Constantin Bakaleinikoff
- Production company: RKO-Pathé
- Distributed by: RKO Radio Pictures
- Release dates: July 29, 1953 (Premiere-Los Angeles); September 1, 1953 (US)
- Running time: 65 minutes
- Country: United States
- Language: English

Below the Sahara is a 1953 American documentary film which follows the filmmaking couple, Armand and Michaela Denis, as they travel throughout Africa. Produced by RKO-Pathé, it was distributed by its sister company, RKO Radio Pictures, who premiered the film in Los Angeles on July 29, 1953, with a national release one month later, on September 1. Armand Denis produced, directed and narrated the film, from dialogue written by Jerome Brondfield and Burton Benjamin.

== Synopsis ==
The documentary follows the travels of Armand Denis and his wife, Michaela Denis, as they travel around sub-Saharan Africa. Their safari begins in British East Africa, and continues on to Victoria Falls. From there they travel to South Africa, and trek up the coast of southwest Africa, before once more heading inland, where they meet with various African tribes. They fly to an animal farm run by Carr Hartley, where they learn how cheetahs are trained to hunt down other wild animals. The Denises next go to another animal farm, this one specializing in ostriches, where Michaela mounts and rides an ostrich. Their final stop is at a village where the local tribe is about to go on a gorilla hunt. The Denises go on the hunt with them, which results in the killing of two male gorillas who are taken back to the village to be eaten.

Other highlights of the safari include capturing a large sea lion in order to take a blood sample, and one of their carriers being attacked by a leopard they had been filming. The film offers wonderful vistas and some beautiful footage of wildlife including crocodiles, gazelles, elephants, gannets, antelopes, hippopotamus, water buffalos, penguins, and pelicans.

== Cast ==
- Armand Denis as himself /narrator
- Michaela Denis (Herself)
- Carr Hartley as himself
- Raymond Hook as himself

(Cast list as per AFI film database)

== Reception ==
Motion Picture Daily gave the documentary a positive review, calling it "an engrossing trip", and applauding the commentary and the camerawork, although they thought it was a bit meandering and ingratiating. However, Bosley Crowther of The New York Times was less kind to the documentary, claiming it contained nothing "fresh", and that all the scenes had already been seen before. Crowther was particularly critical of the work of Michaela Denis in the picture, stating, "The best to be said for Michaela, as a frequent participant in the show, is that she is photogenic. As a naturalist, she appears all thumbs."
