= Coast to Coast Tickets =

American ticket broker

CoastToCoastTickets
- Type: Subsidiary, Acquired October 2012
- Industry: Ticket broker
- Founded: 2000
- Headquarters: Chicago, Illinois, USA
- Area served: United States / United Kingdom / Canada
- Products: Tickets for Concert, Sports, theater, entertainment events
- Website: coasttocoasttickets.com

Coast to Coast Tickets is an American online marketer of event tickets, also known as a ticket broker, operating in the secondary ticket market. The company is based in Chicago, Illinois.

Coast to Coast Tickets entered the Ticket News Top 20 Secondary Ticket Sellers list at #13 in March 2007, and holding the #4 position as of April 4, 2009.

== History ==
Coast to Coast's founder first began selling tickets in the late nineties while studying at the University of Missouri, a community with a strong local market for tickets , but without the size and population to attract established brokers.

In 2000, Coast to Coast Tickets was officially founded, and the name was trademarked in 2001. The business expanded over the next few years. Occupying a small home-based office before moving to an old church building, then finally converting to a larger office building in Austin, TX. Sales grew as well, grossing $2.6 million in revenue in 2004, and $8.7 million in 2005, for a 3-year growth rate of 915.4%.

In 2004, the Coast to Coast website went through a significant redesign, its goal to add an elevated level of customer service to the secondary ticket market by including concert and sports schedules, artist and team biographies, and event guides for cities and venues throughout the world. Over the same period, the size of the team was tripled, bringing in full and part-time help to provide telephone support. In 2005, the company grew again when Jason Randall (formerly of the Boston Consulting Group, Goldman Sachs and Deloitte & Touche) left his position as Director of Brand Marketing at Maritz, LLC to join Coast to Coast as CEO.

The company website adopted its current look and slogan (great tickets from nice people) in early 2006.

In 2009, Coast to Coast Tickets shifted their marketing approach from an advertising-only model to a social media marketing model, becoming active on Facebook and Twitter, and incorporating an official company blog.

== Services ==
Coast to Coast to Coast Tickets has marketed tickets to sports, concert and theater events since its inception. In 2007, Coast to Coast added two additional services relatively new to the secondary ticket market: a ticket insurance option, allowing customers to obtain refunds should they be unable to attend an event, and a ticket-selling marketplace, where customers can add their own tickets to the ticket listings displayed on www.coasttocoasttickets.com.

== Awards ==
In November 2005, Street & Smith’s Journal ranked Coast to Coast as #7 out of the top 10 sports ticket brokers (based on Coast to Coast’s 748,000 unique visitors to the site the previous month – a figure that had risen 469.9% from the same publication’s list the previous year).

The Austin Business Journal also noted Coast to Coast’s rapid growth by including the company in their 2005 and 2006 "Fast 50" lists for the fastest-growing Austin companies grossing under $10 million in revenue.

Coast to Coast Tickets has also been recognized three years running in the Inc. 500, a list of the 500 fastest-growing privately held US companies published annually by Inc. Magazine. In 2005, Coast to Coast held the #359 spot. The company was recognized again the following year, in 2006, when they became the 6th fastest-growing retailer on the Inc. 500 list, jumping 273 spots to #86. In 2007, Coast to Coast secured the #323 spot with a 3-year growth rate of 831.7%.

In addition to being noted in top seller lists, publications across the country have looked to Coast to Coast Tickets as a reference in stories and articles about the secondary ticket market, including Bloomberg.com, Red Herring, GQ Magazine, American Way, the Miami Herald, the Austin Business Journal, the Chicago Tribune, the Boston Globe and the San Francisco Chronicle.
