= 1935 Academy Awards =

1935 Academy Awards may refer to:

- 7th Academy Awards, the Academy Awards ceremony that took place in 1935
- 8th Academy Awards, the 1936 ceremony honoring the best in film for 1935
