= Battle for Life =

1934 film

Battle for Life is a nature documentary series made from 1932 until 1934 by Horace Woodard and Stacy Woodard, The short films include the 1935 Oscar award-winning City of Wax, about honey bees. The one-reel short films were released by Educational Pictures. A homemade camera setup for closeups was used. The Woodards followed the series with another series titled Struggle to Live.

Battle for Life films were made with specially designed cameras.

== Filmography ==
- Beneath Our Feet (1933)
- City of Wax (1934)

City of Wax
- Produced by: Horace Woodard; Stacy Woodard
- Narrated by: Gayne Whitman
- Distributed by: Fox Film Corporation
- Release date: February 9, 1934
- Running time: 20 minutes
- Country: United States
- Language: English

== City of Wax ==
City of Wax is a 1934 American short documentary film produced by Horace and Stacy Woodard about the life of a bee. It won the Oscar at the 7th Academy Awards in 1935 for Best Short Subject (Novelty). The Academy Film Archive preserved City of Wax in 2007.
