= Edward Riddiford =

Edward Joshua "King" Riddiford (7 August 1842 – 2 May 1911) was a New Zealand runholder. He was born in Hutt Valley, Wellington, New Zealand in 1842. He married Eleanor Caroline (Nellie) Bunny (1860–1938) on 3 October 1878 at St James' Church in Lower Hutt. She was the daughter of the politician Henry Bunny. Riddiford died at Longburn of a heart attack in 1911. He was described as New Zealand's only millionaire. He had a wife, who died when hit by a van.

A grandson, Sir William O'Brien Lindsay, was Chief Justice of the Sudan.

A granddaughter, Jocelyn Vogel, had Vogel House built in Lower Hutt.
