= Bosom Friends =

1934 film

- Starring: James F. Clemenger
- Edited by: Sam Citron
- Production company: Skibo Productions for Educational Films Corporation of America
- Distributed by: Fox Film
- Release date: 1934
- Countries: Canada; United States
- Language: English

Bosom Friends is a 1934 American short film presented by E. W. Hammons. It was nominated for an Academy Award at the 7th Academy Awards in 1934 for Best Short Subject (Novelty). The film was preserved by the Academy Film Archive, in conjunction with the UCLA Film and Television Archive, in 2013.

== Cast ==
- James F. Clemenger as Narrator
