= 7th Academy Awards =

- Date: February 27, 1935
- Site: Biltmore Hotel in Los Angeles, California
- Hosted by: Irvin S. Cobb

Highlights
- Best Picture: It Happened One Night
- Most awards: It Happened One Night (5)
- Most nominations: One Night of Love (6)

The 7th Academy Awards, honoring the best films for 1934, was held on February 27, 1935, at the Biltmore Hotel in Los Angeles, California. They were hosted by Irvin S. Cobb. Since this ceremony, the Academy's award eligibility period coincided with the calendar year (with temporary exceptions for the 93rd and 94th Academy Awards due to the COVID-19 pandemic).

Frank Capra's influential romantic comedy It Happened One Night became the first of three films to date to "sweep" the top five awards: Best Picture, Best Director, Best Actor, Best Actress, and Best Screenplay. This feat would later be matched by One Flew Over the Cuckoo's Nest in 1975 and The Silence of the Lambs in 1991. It also was the first romantic comedy to win Best Picture, and the first film to win two acting Oscars as well as the first film to win more than 3 awards.

The categories of Best Film Editing, Best Original Score, and Best Original Song were introduced this year. This was the first of only two years in which write-in candidates were permitted, a response to a controversy surrounding Bette Davis not being nominated for her role in Of Human Bondage. The Academy, inundated by calls, letters and editorials decrying this slight, told members they could vote in names on a printed ballot or write in any other name that was desired. Claudette Colbert declared that this announcement would give Davis the win in a walk. However, in final voting, Davis came in fourth place. Colbert, who viewed herself as having no chance, was informed of her victory upon boarding a train for New York. She hastily rushed into the ceremony to collect her award, then went back to the waiting train.

This was the last time that all Best Actor nominees were first time acting nominees until the 95th Academy Awards, and the last time until the 43rd Academy Awards where either lead acting category was entirely first-time nominees.

Six-year-old Shirley Temple received the first Juvenile Award, making her the youngest Oscar recipient. Clark Gable was the first Best Actor winner born in the 20th century (1901).

== Winners and nominees ==
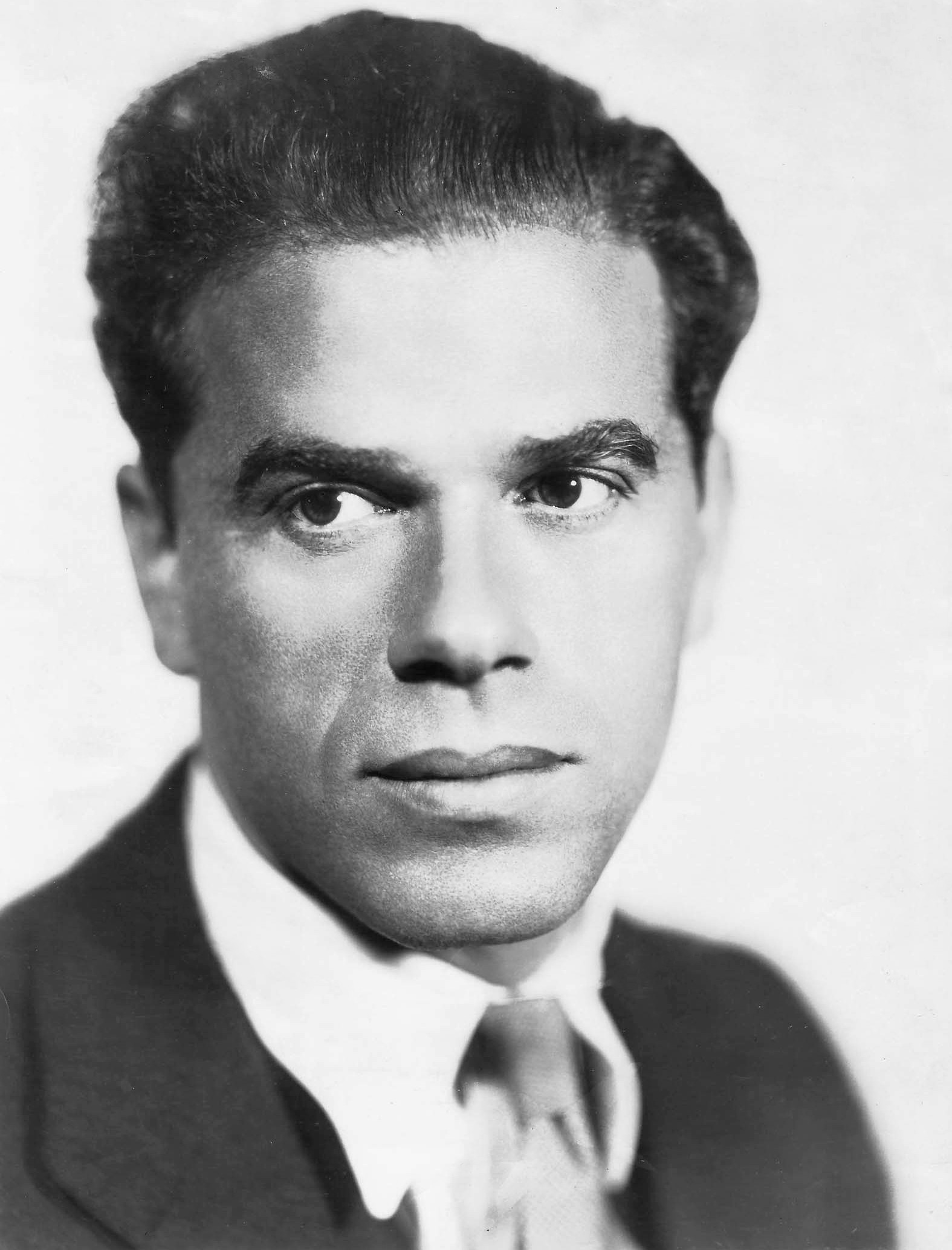
Frank Capra; Best Director winner and Best Picture co-winner

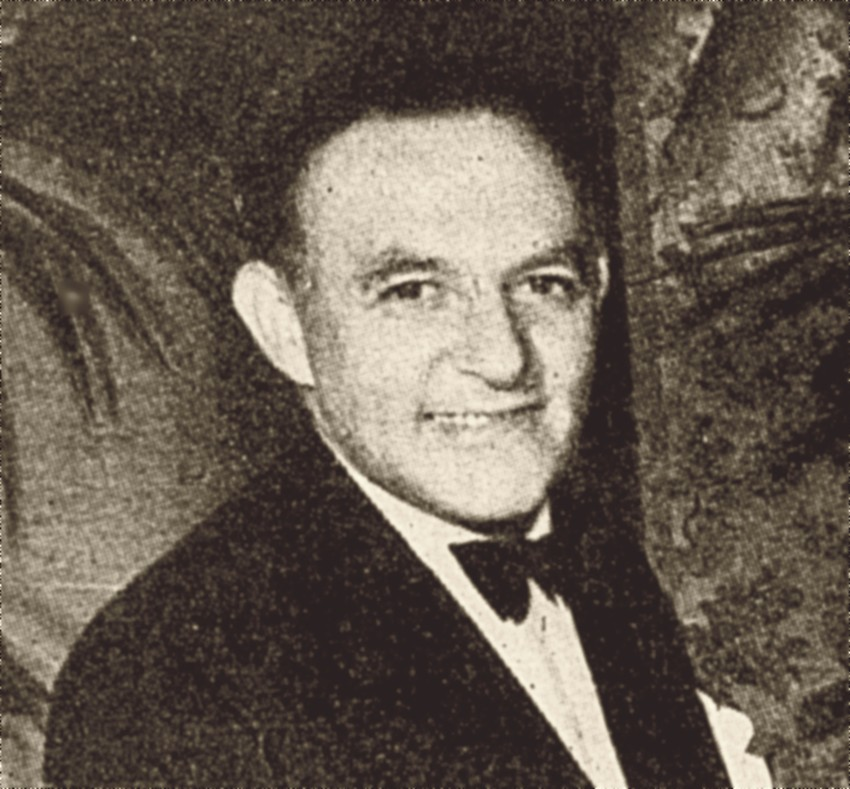
Harry Cohn; Best Picture co-winner

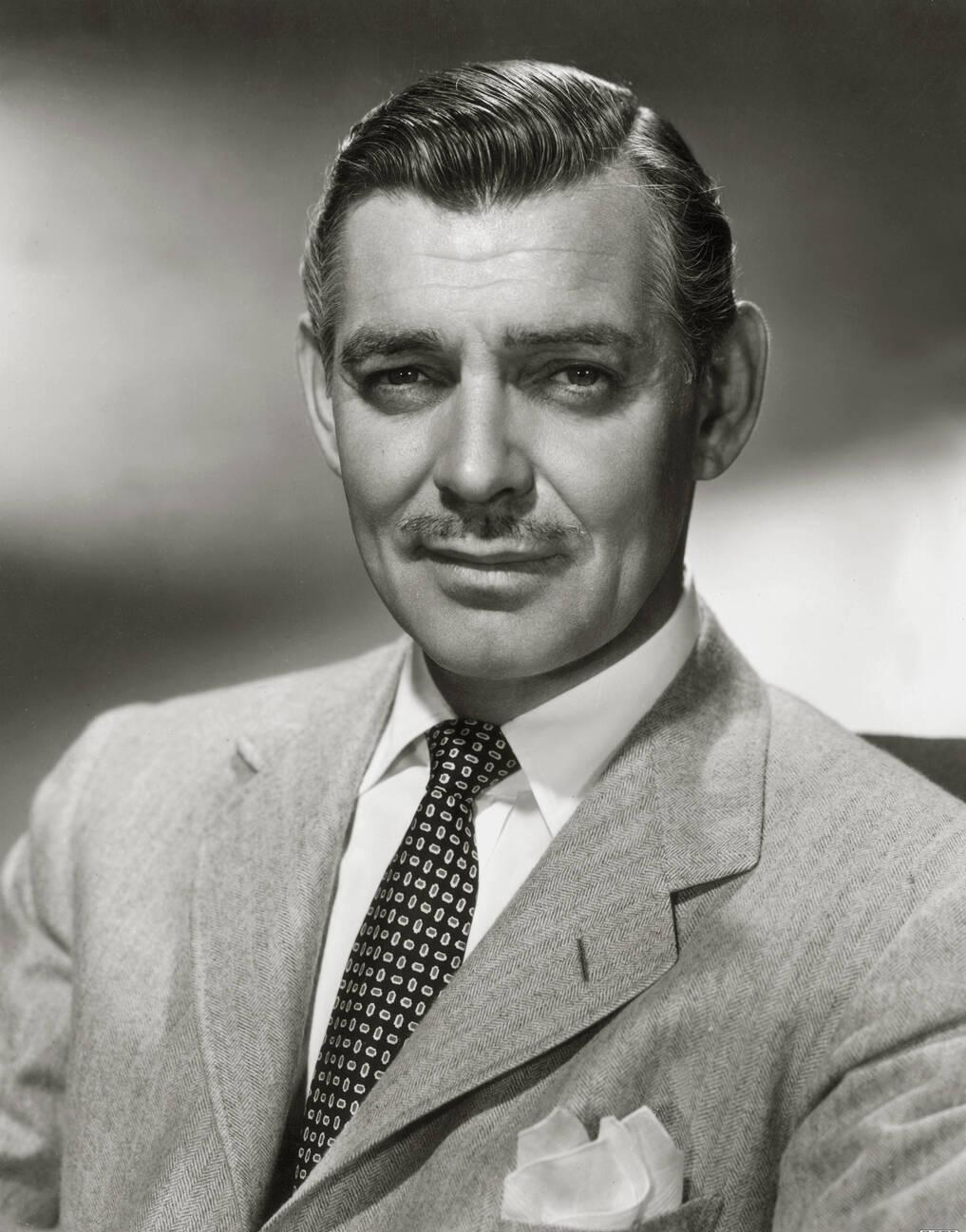
Clark Gable; Best Actor winner

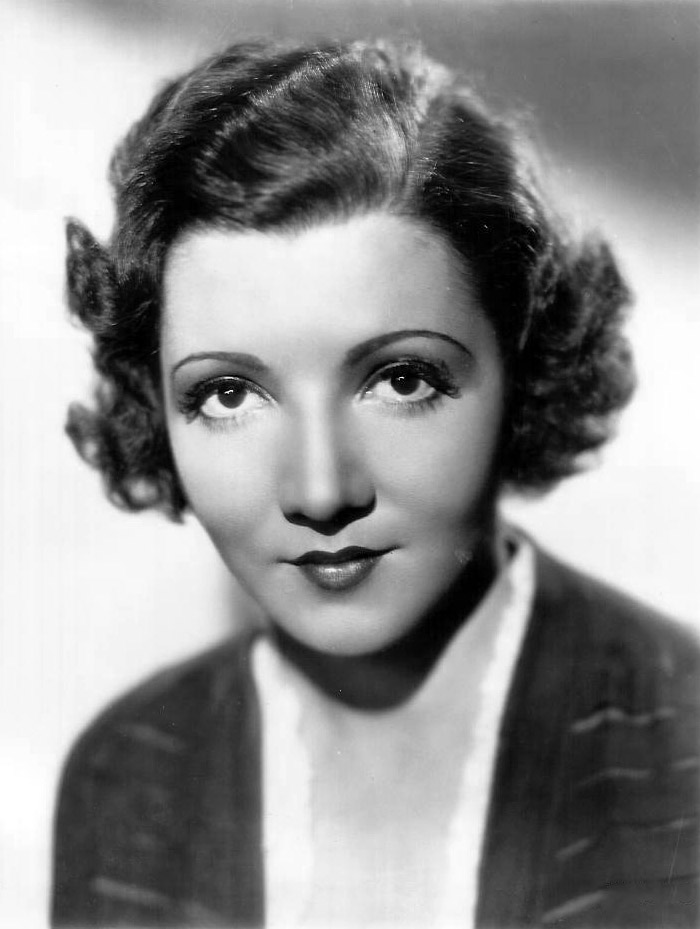
Claudette Colbert; Best Actress winner

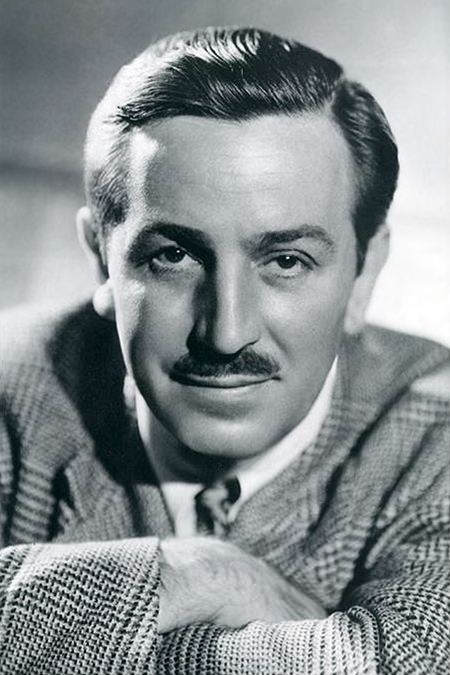
Walt Disney; Best Short Subject, Cartoon winner

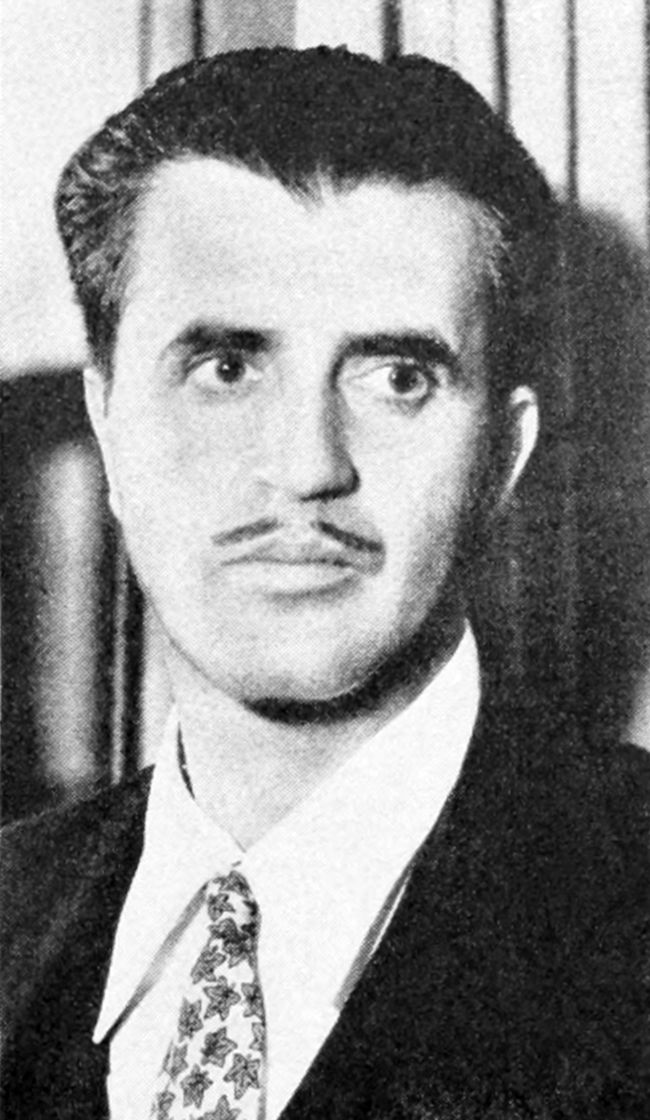
Cedric Gibbons; Best Art Direction co-winner

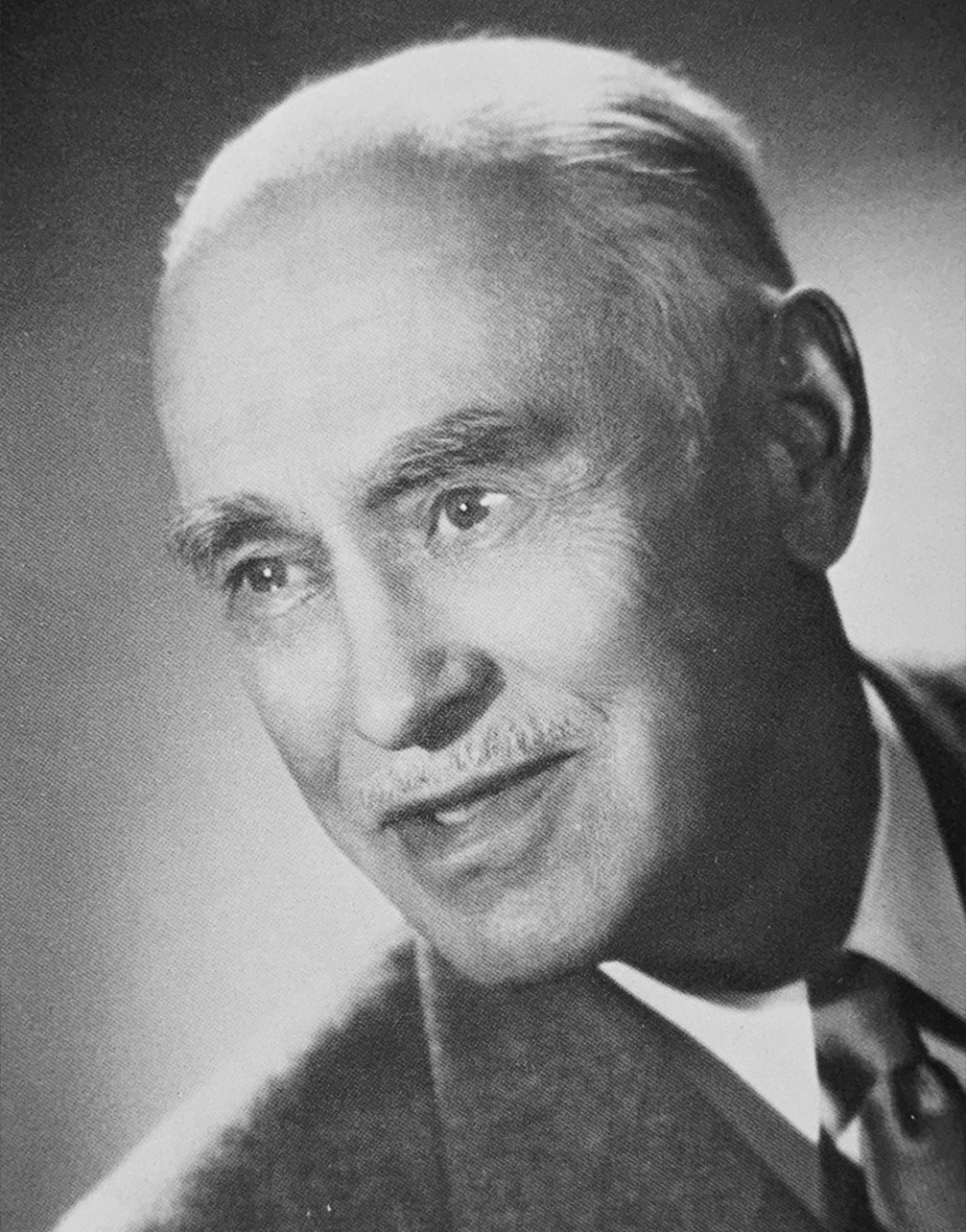
Conrad A. Nervig; Best Film Editing winner

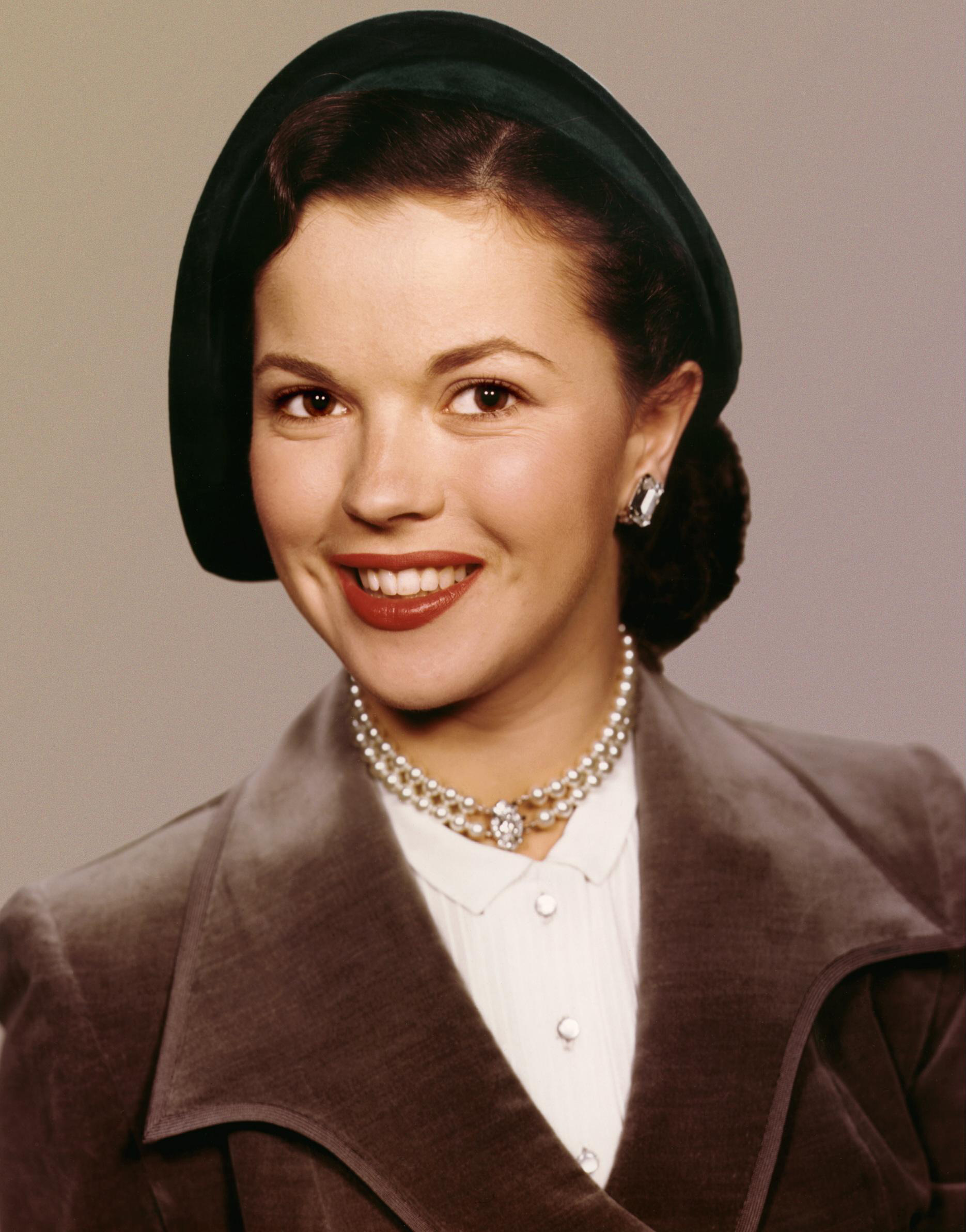
Shirley Temple; Juvenile Academy Award recipient

=== Awards ===
Nominees were announced on February 5, 1935. Winners are listed first and highlighted in boldface.

| **Outstanding Production**: **It Happened One Night** **– Frank Capra and Harry Cohn for Columbia**; The Barretts of Wimpole Street – Irving Thalberg for Metro-Goldwyn-Mayer; Cleopatra – Cecil B. DeMille for Paramount; Flirtation Walk – Jack L. Warner, Hal B. Wallis, and Robert Lord for First National; The Gay Divorcee – Pandro S. Berman for RKO Pictures; Here Comes the Navy – Louis Edelman for Warner Bros.; The House of Rothschild – Darryl F. Zanuck, William Goetz, and Raymond Griffith for 20th Century; Imitation of Life – John M. Stahl for Universal; One Night of Love – Harry Cohn and Everett Riskin for Columbia; The Thin Man – Hunt Stromberg for Metro-Goldwyn-Mayer; Viva Villa! – David O. Selznick for Metro-Goldwyn-Mayer; The White Parade – Jesse L. Lasky for Fox Film Co. | **Best Directing**: **Frank Capra – It Happened One Night**; Victor Schertzinger – One Night of Love; W. S. Van Dyke – The Thin Man |
| **Best Actor**: **Clark Gable – It Happened One Night as Peter Warne**; Frank Morgan – The Affairs of Cellini as Alessandro, Duke of Florence; William Powell – The Thin Man as Nick Charles | **Best Actress**: **Claudette Colbert – It Happened One Night as Ellen "Ellie" Andrews**; Bette Davis – Of Human Bondage as Mildred Rogers (write-in, not official nomination); Grace Moore – One Night of Love as Mary Barrett; Norma Shearer – The Barretts of Wimpole Street as Elizabeth Barrett |
| **Best Writing (Original Story)**: **Manhattan Melodrama – Arthur Caesar**; Hide-Out – Mauri Grashin; The Richest Girl in the World – Norman Krasna | **Best Writing (Adaptation)**: **It Happened One Night – Robert Riskin, based on the story "Night Bus" by Samuel Hopkins Adams**; The Thin Man – Frances Goodrich and Albert Hackett, based on the novel by Dashiell Hammett; Viva Villa! – Ben Hecht, based on the novel by Edgecumb Pinchon and O. B. Stade |
| **Best Short Subject (Comedy)**: **La Cucaracha – Kenneth Macgowan and Pioneer Pictures**; Men in Black – Jules White; What, No Men? – Warner Bros. | **Best Short Subject (Novelty)**: **City of Wax – Horace Woodard and Stacy Woodard**; Bosom Friends – Skibo Productions; Strikes and Spares – Pete Smith |
| **Best Short Subject (Cartoon)**: **The Tortoise and the Hare – Walt Disney**; Holiday Land – Screen Gems; Jolly Little Elves – Walter Lantz | **Best Music (Scoring)**: **One Night of Love – Columbia Studio Music Department**; The Gay Divorcee – RKO Radio Studio Music Department; The Lost Patrol – RKO Radio Studio Music Department |
| **Best Music (Song)**: **"The Continental" from The Gay Divorcee – Music by Con Conrad; Lyrics by Herb Magidson**; "Carioca" from Flying Down to Rio – Music by Vincent Youmans; Lyrics by Edward Eliscu and Gus Kahn; "Love in Bloom" from She Loves Me Not – Music by Ralph Rainger; Lyrics by Leo Robin | **Best Sound Recording**: **One Night of Love – John P. Livadary**; The Affairs of Cellini – Thomas T. Moulton; Cleopatra – Franklin Hansen; Flirtation Walk – Nathan Levinson; The Gay Divorcee – Carl Dreher; Imitation of Life – Theodore Soderberg; Viva Villa! – Douglas Shearer; The White Parade – Edmund H. Hansen |
| **Best Assistant Director**: **Viva Villa! – John S. Waters**; Cleopatra – Cullen Tate; Imitation of Life – Scott Beal | **Best Art Direction**: **The Merry Widow – Cedric Gibbons and Fredric Hope**; The Affairs of Cellini – Richard Day; The Gay Divorcee – Van Nest Polglase and Carroll Clark |
| **Best Cinematography**: **Cleopatra – Victor Milner**; The Affairs of Cellini – Charles Rosher; Operator 13 – George J. Folsey | **Best Film Editing**: **Eskimo – Conrad A. Nervig**; Cleopatra – Anne Bauchens; One Night of Love – Gene Milford |

=== Special Award ===
- To Shirley Temple, in grateful recognition of her outstanding contribution to screen entertainment during the year 1934.

== Multiple nominations and awards ==
Films with multiple nominations
| Nominations | Film |
|---|---|
| 6 | One Night of Love |
| 5 | Cleopatra |
| 5 | The Gay Divorcee |
| 5 | It Happened One Night |
| 4 | The Affairs of Cellini |
| 4 | The Thin Man |
| 4 | Viva Villa! |
| 3 | Imitation of Life |
| 2 | The Barretts of Wimpole Street |
| 2 | Flirtation Walk |
| 2 | The White Parade |

Films with multiple wins
| Wins | Film |
|---|---|
| 5 | It Happened One Night |
| 2 | One Night of Love |

== See also ==
- 1934 in film
- List of Big Five Academy Award winners and nominees
- List of oldest and youngest Academy Award winners and nominees
