= Sam B. Jacobson =

American film producer

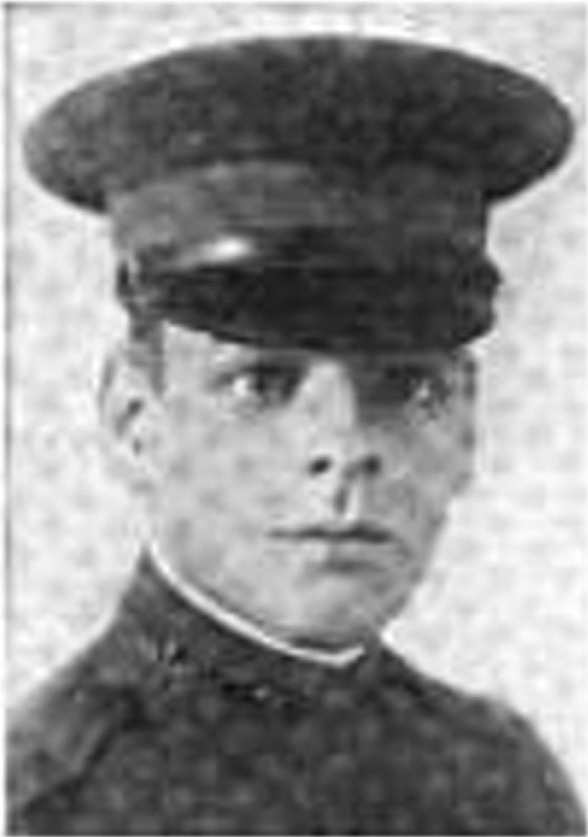
- Sam B. Jacobson as a lieutenant during World War I
- Born: July 4, 1893; Brooklyn, New York
- Died: December 31, 1946 (age 53); Catskill, New York
- Occupations: Film editor and producer
- Known for: Editing Frank Buck’s second movie, Wild Cargo
- Spouse: Never married

Sam B. Jacobson (4 July 1893 - 31 December 1946) , Catskill, New York, age 53) was a film producer and editor, who edited Frank Buck’s second film, Wild Cargo.

== Early years ==
Sam B. Jacobson was born in Brooklyn, New York, son of Max W Jacobson, a Russian immigrant insurance agent, and Stella Jacobson. Sam B. Jacobson served in World War I as a lieutenant responsible for providing troop entertainment.

== Motion Pictures ==
In 1928, Jacobson, as publicity director at Universal Pictures, created the Laemmle Novelties, a series of thirteen one-reel-silent films directed by Jacque Rollens. In Wooden Soldier and Rag Doll the characters are toys, Wax Figures covers the adventures of a group of store window dummies, the stars of Monkey Shines are a pair of monkeys at the zoo, the hero of Prodigal Pup is a dog and in Wash Line Romance a wash line is the title character; the people who wear what is hanging on the wash line do not appear except as hands and feet. Other titles in the series: Footprints, Faces, Bottles, Handicapped, Shadows, Daydreams, and Half Holiday. Subsequently, Jacobson originated and produced the Universal Newspaper Newsreel.

Jacobson was a vice president of First National Pictures in 1929. In the 1930s he served as General Production Manager for Van Beuren Studios, where he edited Frank Buck’s second film, Wild Cargo, and another movie, Adventure Girl with Joan Lowell. Jacobson was associate producer of Cross Country Cruise, Ladies Must Love, and Love, Honor, and Oh! Baby. He also wrote film criticism for a Los Angeles Jewish newspaper.

== Later life ==
For 13 and a half years, Jacobson was the owner of a weekly newspaper, the Hunter (NY) Review. He died of heart disease and pneumonia in 1946 and is buried in Maplewood Cemetery, Jewett, New York. Jacobsen's parents, a brother, and two sisters survived him.
