= Herman Fuchs =

American violinist

- Born: Herman Samuel Fuchs; 10 December 1900; New York City, U.S.
- Died: November 1967 (age 66); New York, U.S.
- Occupation: violinist
- Known for: work with Frank Buck

Herman Samuel Fuchs (10 December 1900 – November 1967) was an American violinist who provided music for the Frank Buck movie Jungle Cavalcade.

== Early years ==
Herman Fuchs was the son of Harry Fuchs, the proprietor of a laundry, and Gussie Fuchs. Harry and Gussie immigrated from Bessarabia, October 1887. Herman was born at 137 Essex Street, on the Lower East Side of Manhattan, and later lived in Brooklyn (234 Rodney Street), according to his 1922 passport application. Herman Fuchs studied with the conductor Josiah Zuro, worked with Hugo Riesenfeld, and attended Fordham University to understand copyright law.

== Career ==
Fuchs became music editor for Pathé News in 1927. He composed for many films, among them The Golden Age of Comedy (1957) and When Comedy was King (1960). He also composed for television, including five episodes of The Patty Duke Show.

== Work with Frank Buck ==
In 1941, Fuchs, together with Nathaniel Shilkret, composed music for the Frank Buck movie Jungle Cavalcade.

== Later life ==
Fuchs died aged 66 in New York.
