= 1978 National Archives vault fire =

Fire in Suitland, Maryland, US

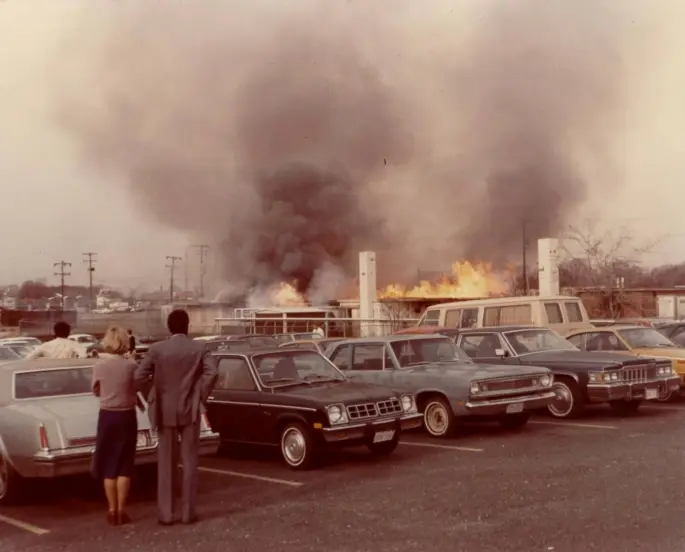
- Employees watch explosions as poisonous hydrogen cyanide and sulfur dioxide gases spread through the area.
- Date: December 7, 1978
- Location: Suitland, Maryland, United States
- Cause: Ignition of stored nitrate film
- Outcome: Loss of archived newsreels
- Deaths: 0
- Injuries: 18 (14 firefighters, three civilians and one police officer)

A major fire occurred at the US National Archives and Records Administration's film vault in Suitland, Maryland, on December 7, 1978. The fire destroyed 12.6 million feet of Universal Pictures Newsreel footage from 1929 to 1967 — most of it single-copy, irreplaceable, and never seen by the public. It included film of the bombing of Pearl Harbor, other World War II combat footage, and the Great Depression. The cause of the fire and who was responsible was controversial, with three parties involved in multiple private and government investigations.

== Film stock ==
Most of the film stock consisted of outtakes of newsreels produced during World War II that had never been seen by the public. It was donated by MCA-Universal Pictures to the National Archives in 1974 as a gift to the American people. It was in the public domain and irreplaceable because there were no copies. The Universal newsreels that survived the fire have since become some of the most frequently requested items in the National Archives film collection.

The outtakes were stored in 27 film vaults located at the Suitland, Maryland National Archives facility, in Building A. There were two other buildings, Buildings B and C of the same size. The newsreels themselves - not the outtakes - were not destroyed because the National Archives had already transferred them to safer film stock and they were kept at a different location. By the time of the fire, the National Archives was still in the process of transferring the outtakes to safety stock.

The fire destroyed almost everything in Building A including about 12.6 million feet of 35mm black-and-white negatives, or about 70% of the MCA-U donation. An additional 42,000 feet of safety stock was destroyed. A third group, totaling 600,000 feet, was also destroyed but had backups elsewhere.

== Fire ==
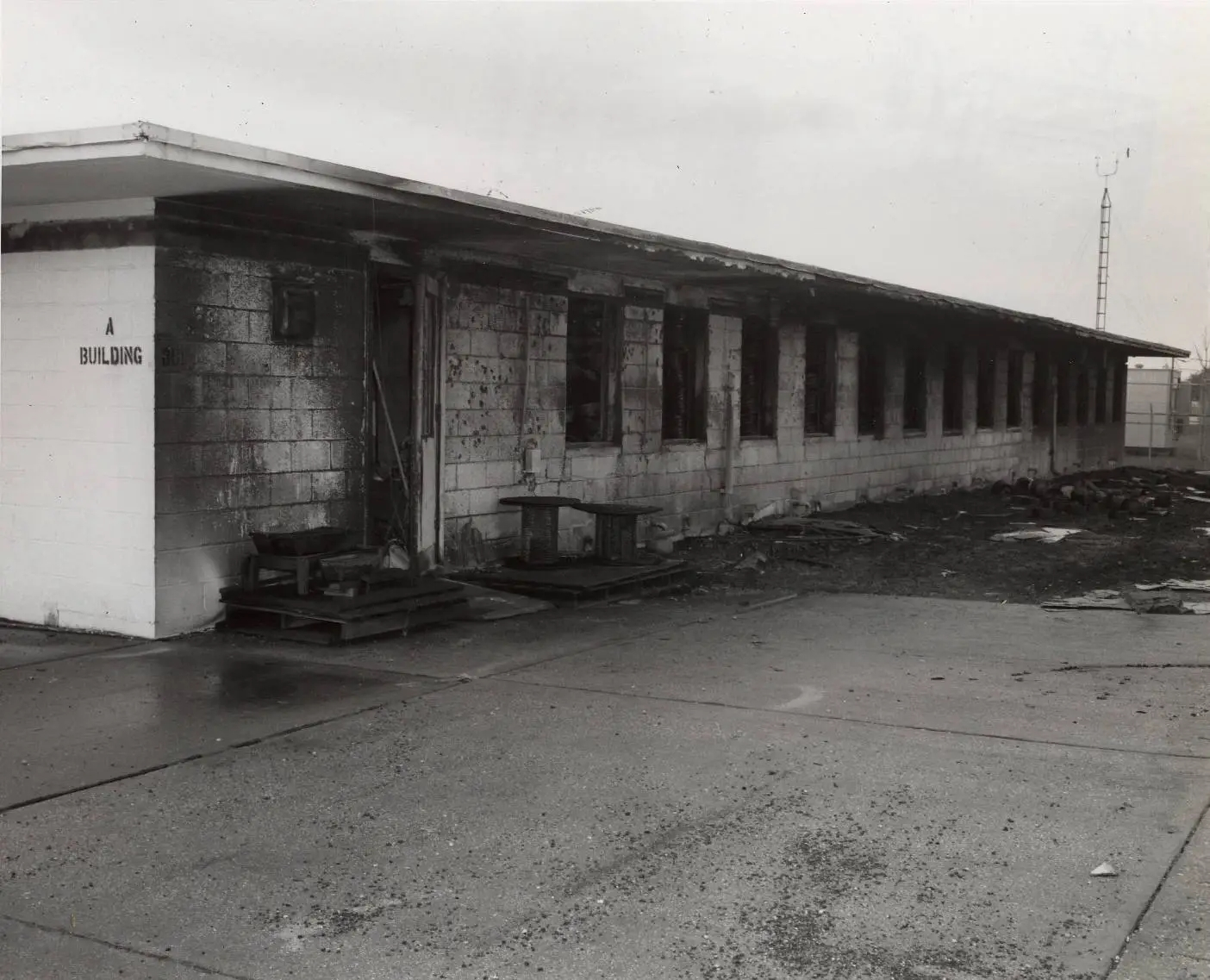
Building A was gutted by fire and explosions. 21 of 27 interior vaults were destroyed.

The vaults were constructed in 1948 with an intended design life of only three years. They were still in use in 1978, 27 years after they had become obsolete. When Universal donated the films they were reassured a fire suppression system would be installed, and it was, but the "wet pipe" sprinklers were inappropriate for nitrate film which can burn when wet. Furthermore, a waterflow alarm was installed inappropriately, and some sprinkler heads had been removed at the time of the fire. Sections of the sprinkler system had been removed months before the fire to accommodate crews installing a new air conditioning system. On the day of the fire, the crew were using unapproved electrical tools, and when they broke for lunch, they left the door open allowing the vaults to breathe. The fire started soon after.

Whatever the proximate cause - contractors, government and investigators all had conflicting theories - the fire ignited at around noon. A 9-1-1 emergency call was placed to the Prince George's County Fire Department in Suitland, which responded within minutes. In an attempt to look for people who might be trapped inside, the firefighters opened fireproof doors and broke windows, allowing oxygen to feed the inferno. According to witnesses (other than the firefighters), the fire was actually fairly contained and diminishing, until firefighters arrived. Three large explosions, including one backdraft event, threw firefighters back against a fence. Film stock in 21 different vaults was destroyed, and the fire was finally extinguished after one hour.

Poisonous hydrogen cyanide and sulfur dioxide gases created by the burning of the nitrocellulose film spread through the area, forcing the evacuation of homes and businesses. A total of 18 people were injured, including 14 firefighters, one police officer and three civilians.

== Investigations ==
The fire was investigated by the General Services Administration (GSA), which had constructed the buildings in 1948. The agency believed that the fire was started by a spark from tools used by the contractors, including electrical drills, arc welders and blowtorches.

Separate investigations by the Prince Georges Fire Department, and the insurance investigator for the contractor doing the work on the vaults, came to different conclusions from the GSA. They blamed the malfunctioning air-conditioning system for heating the rooms rather than cooling them. Although it was a cool December day, they believed that the fire likely started with a single reel of film combusting in Building A's vault number 8. They proportioned no blame on the fire department or contractors, but rather on poor building maintenance by the GSA.

The fire was investigated by the House of Representatives under chairman L. Richardson Preyer (D-NC), which issued the result of its hearing in June 1979, accusing the government (GSA) of "gross mismanagement". The Preyer report did not investigate the role of the fire department because it was outside the jurisdiction of the federal government.

In late summer 1979, independent expert and investigator W. H. Utterback of Amarillo, Texas released a lengthy report which, while largely agreeing with previous reports, assigned significant blame on the fire department. A key point of the report was that the fire was contained and diminishing until the fire department arrived and needlessly began breaching doors and breaking windows long after National Archives staff had fled the building.

== See also ==
Example outtake footage showing a Standard Oil tank fire c. 1930s. This outtake reel of a petroleum fire survived the 1978 nitrate fire.

- 1914 Lubin vault fire
- 1937 Fox vault fire
- 1965 MGM vault fire
- 2008 Universal Studios fire
