= William O'Brien Lindsay =

Chief Justice of Anglo-Egyptian Sudan

Sir William Lindsay KBE

Chief Justice of the Sudan
- In office 1954–1955
- Preceded by: R. C. Stanley-Baker
- Succeeded by: Mohamed Ahmed Abu Rannat

Personal details
- Born: 8 October 1909 Canterbury, Kent, England
- Died: 20 October 1975 (aged 66) Nairobi, Kenya

Sir William O'Brien Lindsay KBE (8 October 1909 – 20 October 1975) was the Chief Justice of Anglo-Egyptian Sudan from 1950 or 1954 to 1955, during the period when it was administered as an Anglo-Egyptian condominium. He served in the Sudan Political Service from 1932 to 1955, and later establishing a law firm in Nairobi, Kenya. Lindsay was a talented sportsman as a youth, playing first-class cricket for Oxford University, Scotland and Kent County Cricket Club.

== Early life and family ==
Lindsay was born in Canterbury, Kent, to Elsie Catherine Harriet (née Riddiford) and Michael Egan Lindsay. His parents were both New Zealanders by birth, with his mother being the daughter of Edward Joshua Riddiford and granddaughter of Henry Bunny, both prominent landowners there. However, the couple's four children were all born in the United Kingdom – their father had served with the 1st New Zealand Contingent during the Second Boer War, then transferring to the British Army as an officer with the 7th Dragoon Guards and the Fife and Forfar Yeomanry in World War I. He became a Deputy Lieutenant of Fife.

== Sporting career ==
William O'Brien Lindsay
Cricket information
- Batting: Right-handed
- Role: Wicket-keeper

Domestic team information
- Years: Team
- 1929–1932: Oxford University
- 1929: Scotland
- 1931: Kent

Career statistics
Competition	First-class
Matches	17
Runs scored	531
Batting average	19.66
100s/50s	0/1
Top score	63
Balls bowled	24
Wickets	0
Bowling average	–
5 wickets in innings	–
10 wickets in match	–
Best bowling	–
Catches/stumpings	10/2
- Source: ESPNCricinfo, 15 August 2019

Like his older brothers, Lindsay was educated at Harrow School. He played for the school cricket team for three years, captaining it in 1928, his final year, when he averaged 55 runs per innings. also representing a combined Public Schools team. He went on to Balliol College, Oxford, and began playing for the Oxford University Cricket Club, making his first-class debut in June 1929, against Gloucestershire. A wicket-keeper and right-handed top-order batsman, Lindsay went on to play three more first-class games during the 1929 season – two for Oxford (against the Free Foresters and Lancashire), and one for Scotland, his father's place of residence. His sole appearance for Scotland came against the touring South African team, which was completed within two days as Scotland lost by an innings.

Lindsay played only once at first-class level during the 1930 season, but the following year made five first-class appearances for Oxford, including in the annual University Match against Cambridge University (played at Lord's). He also made two County Championship appearances for Kent, against Warwickshire and Middlesex within the space of five days. He kept wicket and opened the batting (with Colin Fairservice) against Warwickshire, but Les Ames, the county's usual wicket-keeper, returned against Middlesex, with Lindsay playing solely as a batsman. In 1932, Lindsay played in another five first-class fixtures for the university, and against Lancashire scored 63 runs, his first and only half-century. His season included matches against two touring international teams, the Indians and the South Americans, with his game against the South American composite team being his final first-class match.

== Professional career and later life ==
In 1932, Lindsay joined the Sudan Political Service, which administered Anglo-Egyptian Sudan. During the Second World War, he was twice given an emergency commission as a second lieutenant in the Sudan Defence Force. Towards the war's end, in 1944, Lindsay transferred to the legal department of the civil service. He was appointed to the country's judiciary, as chief justice in 1950 according to one source and 1954 according to another source. He served until 1955, as one of the last British chief justices before the country was given independence in 1956 (Republic of the Sudan). Upon leaving office, he was made a Knight Commander of the Order of the British Empire (KBE) in the 1955 Birthday Honours. After retiring, Lindsay opened a law firm in Nairobi, Kenya, where he lived until his death in 1975 (aged 66). He had married three times – firstly in 1937, to Sevilla Glass Hooper; secondly in 1962, to Elizabeth Doreen Sturman; and thirdly in 1975 (three months before his death), to Michaela Denis (the widow and partner of filmmaker Armand Denis).
