= Savage Splendor =

- Directed by: Armand Denis; Lewis Cotlow
- Starring: Tim Holt
- Distributed by: RKO Radio Pictures
- Release date: August 28, 1949 (Philadelphia)
- Country: United States
- Language: English

Savage Splendor is a 1949 documentary directed by Armand Denis and Lewis Cotlow, and starring Tim Holt.

== Release ==
The film premeiered at the Stanton theater in Philadelphia on August 28, 1949, paired with Disney's True-Life Adventure film Seal Island. It grossed $20,000 in its first week.

It made a profit of $250,000 and was RKO's most popular film of the year.
