= Wild Cargo (film) =

1934 film by Armand Denis

- The film’s theatrical poster
- Directed by: Armand Denis
- Written by: Frank Buck; Edward Anthony; Courtney Ryley Cooper (dialogue and narration)
- Produced by: Amedee J. Van Beuren
- Starring: Frank Buck
- Cinematography: Leroy G. Phelps; Nicholas Cavaliere
- Edited by: Sam B. Jacobson
- Music by: Winston Sharples
- Production company: Van Beuren Studios
- Distributed by: RKO Pictures
- Release date: April 6, 1934
- Running time: 96 minutes
- Country: United States
- Language: English

Wild Cargo is a 1934 jungle adventure documentary starring Frank Buck, based on the 1932 book of the same name. Buck depicts the ingenious methods by which he traps wild birds, mammals and reptiles. Many scenes were photographed on the vast Malayan estates of Buck's friend, Sultan Ibrahim of Johor, who appears in person in the film.

== Scenes ==
Among the scenes in the film are:

- a python's escape from its box; Buck recaptures the giant snake.
- a fight to the death between a black panther and a python in which the python comes off victorious
- Buck traps a man-eating tiger
- a python crawls in between the bars of a pig pen and swallows the pig; the snake has imprisoned itself, for with the pig inside it, it could not extricate itself from the pen
- a python attacks Buck in the jungle, and Buck must shoot the huge snake to save his own life
- a king cobra escapes from its box and attacks Buck

== Behind the camera ==
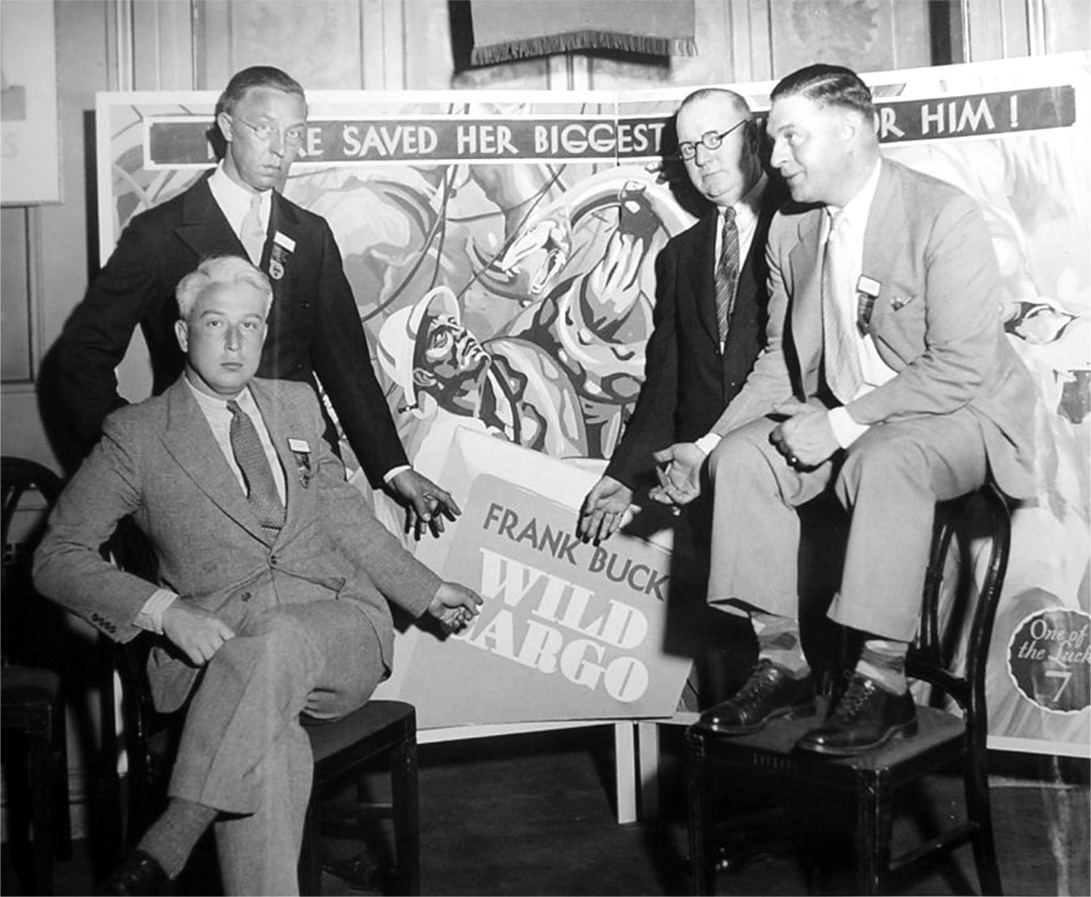
Director Armand Denis (seated right) with RKO exhibitors and poster for Wild Cargo (ca. 1934)

Cameraman Leroy G. Phelps was nearly crippled by an infection he acquired after scratching himself on a poisonous renghus (probably rengas) plant. Buck and Phelps were almost trampled by a herd of stampeding water buffalo; they were spared only when the animals changed direction at the last moment.

== Reception ==
According to The New York Times, "Although it may seem as though several incidents in the screen work were prearranged, they are nevertheless quite thrilling."

The film earned RKO a profit of $100,000. The film was a box office disappointment for RKO.
