= Jay Bonafield =

American film producer

- Born: March 29, 1910; Tunnelton, West Virginia
- Died: June 5, 1961 (aged 51); Larchmont, New York
- Occupation: film producer
- Known for: work with Frank Buck, Stanley Kubrick
- Spouse(s): Mae Bonafield, Doris Bonafield

William Jay Bonafield (March 29, 1910 – June 5, 1961) was a producer who edited Frank Buck's film Jungle Cavalcade.

Jay Bonafield was the son of Hugh William Bonafield (1876–1939) and Berta C. Montgomery Bonafield (1878–1965). Jay was educated in local schools, and left school after eighth grade, according to the 1940 US Census. Jay joined Pathé News in 1931. In 1941 he edited Frank Buck's Jungle Cavalcade. In 1946 Bonafield was named vice president of RKO-Pathé in charge of non-newsreel productions. In 1952 he was placed in charge of RKO short subjects. He was executive vice president of RKO until he resigned in 1957 to open an independent production company.

Bonafield was a producer of the first film Stanley Kubrick directed, Day of the Fight.
