= Out of Evil =

1950 Israeli film

- Directed by: Joseph Krumgold
- Written by: Yehuda Ya'ari
- Produced by: Leo Herrmann
- Starring: Mordechai Ben-Ze'ev, Nahum Buchman, Roberta Hodes
- Cinematography: Leroy Phelps, Alphonso Frenguelli
- Production company: Urim Palestine Film Company
- Release date: 1950
- Running time: 84 minutes
- Country: Israel
- Language: English

Out of Evil (Hebrew: Mi Klalah L'Brahah) is a 1950 film directed by Joseph Krumgold, starring Mordechai Ben-Ze'ev, Nahum Buchman, and Roberta Hodes. The film follows a family's movements between a kibbutz and Nazi Germany, as well as between peacetime and the 1948 Arab-Israeli War. It was screened at the 6th Locarno Film Festival and screened in competition at the 1950 Venice Film Festival, and released in Israel in 1951.

== Synopsis ==
The film is set in the 1920s on a kibbutz (communal farm), where a group of young pioneers are working to establish a new home for Jews. At the center of the story is a young couple, Ya’acov and Hava, who fall in love and want to marry, but their desire for a traditional family life creates tension within the community. When the couple becomes pregnant and has a baby, the financial strain on the kibbutz becomes increasingly difficult to manage. The couple decides to leave the kibbutz and return to Munich, only for the parents to be killed by the Nazis. Their son, Joseph Halochem, then returns to the kibbutz and fights in the 1948 Arab-Israeli War.

== Themes ==
The film has been revisited by humanistic scholars. According to Judd Ne’eman, the tension between the family and the group illustrates the Zionist realism movement's emphasis on the collective over the family, in a reversal of the family's traditionally cherished role within Jewish society. Liat Steir-Livny noted that the film depicts a narrative in which diaspora Jews, following punishment in the Holocaust, came to learn bravery and transformed into "new Jews."

Notably, the film's narrative stands out for its acknowledgment of both antisemitism and the goal of achieving a Jewish majority population as motivations for immigration. According to scholar Amanda Bernstein, this nuanced approach became rare in films following that era, with most focusing primarily on antisemitism as the driving force behind immigration.
