= Bring 'Em Back Alive (film) =

1932 film

- Theatrical poster
- Directed by: Clyde E. Elliott
- Written by: Frank Buck, Edward Anthony
- Produced by: Amedee J. Van Beuren
- Starring: Frank Buck
- Narrated by: Frank Buck
- Cinematography: Carl Berger, Nicholas Cavaliere
- Music by: Gene Rodemich
- Production company: Van Beuren Studios
- Distributed by: RKO Radio Pictures
- Release date: August 19, 1932
- Running time: 60 — 70 minutes
- Country: United States
- Language: English
- Budget: $100,000
- Box office: $1,044,000

Bring 'Em Back Alive is a 1932 American Pre-Code jungle adventure documentary filmed in Malaya starring Frank Buck. The film was based on the 1930 book of the same name and promoted with an NBC radio series of the same title. The film's copyright was renewed in 1959, meaning it will enter the public domain in 2028.

== Production ==
After unsuccessfully attempting to interest the main Hollywood motion picture companies to finance his trips to make a series of shorts, Buck approached Amedee Van Beuren whose studio only made cartoons and live action short subjects released through RKO Studios. Van Beuren agreed to Buck's conditions that he finance all expenses of Buck's expedition, pay Buck with a share of the profits and not view any of the footage sent back until Buck was present, as Buck was unsure of how the images would actually look on film. Van Beuren kept his word and when viewing the footage they both realised they had enough film of high quality to make a feature film.

== Photography ==
In Bring ‘Em Back Alive, unlike in most other jungle pictures of the time, director Clyde E. Elliott kept the camera in the background. Neither the camera nor the cameramen are visible in any of the scenes. The result is an infinitely clearer conception of the clashes between tigers, pythons and crocodiles than had been achieved in previous films. The movie was a huge hit, Elliott's (and Frank Buck's) most successful and popular film.

== Animals photographed ==
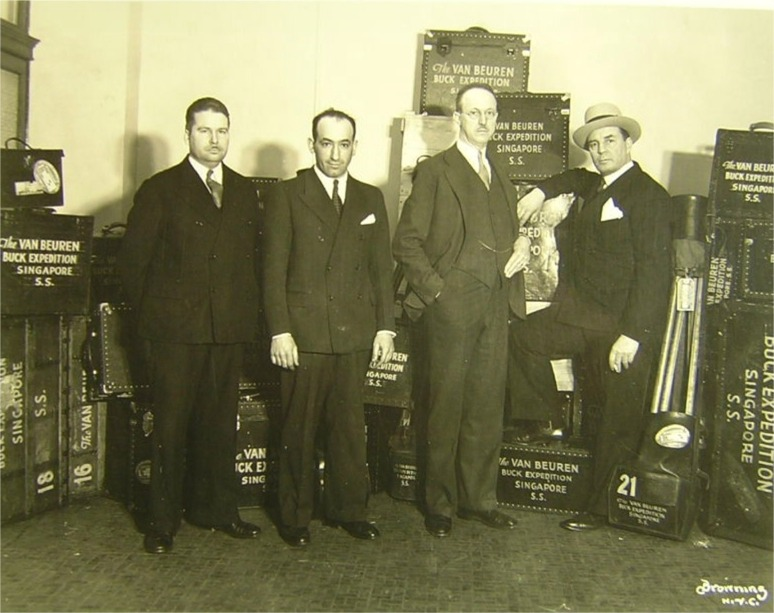
Left to right: Cameramen Nicholas Cavaliere, cinematographer Carl Berger, director Clyde E. Elliott, and star Frank Buck ready to leave for the far east to film Bring 'Em Back Alive

Among the scenes in the film:

- A fight between a tiger and a black Indochinese leopard, which, according to Buck, begins as a thrilling battle and winds up as a streetcorner brawl. However, the black leopard does get itself killed by a reticulated python.
- Buck adopts a honey bear and a baby elephant, which is fed coconut milk.
- An impressive struggle between a huge reticulated python and a juvenile saltwater crocodile, during which the juvenile crocodile's back is broken.
- The climactic fight, the longest and fiercest of all, is that between the reticulated python and a Malayan tiger. The tiger closes his great jaws on the python, but the snake succeeds in saving himself, and as the fight goes on the reptile coils itself around the tiger until the cat is panting for breath. Finally, with a supreme effort the tiger frees itself and slinks off. The python is afterward caught by Buck and so is the tiger. The packing of the python gives the moviegoer a good idea of Buck's nerve, for he grabs the python's head and shoves the reptile into a wooden box.

== Behind the camera ==
Scenes in the jungle were photographed from blinds erected whenever possible against the wind to prevent the human scent from blowing toward the animals. Elephants, Buck reported, are especially dangerous in that respect. Their sight is undeveloped, but their sense of smell is hypersensitive. Nick Cavaliere, one of the cameramen, had an encounter with the python who is one of the film's unwitting stars. The huge reptile was being photographed from a short distance when suddenly it shot forward, aiming at the film boxes, which lay under the camera tripod. The camera crew fled and the python began to encircle the boxes, probably suspecting them of producing the whirring noise which came from the electric motor of the camera. Cavaliere took a long stick and snapped off the motor, and the python lost interest, released its grip on the boxes and glided away.

The wild animals sometimes fought where there was enough light to photograph them, but some of the fiercest bouts continued in the jungle growth where it was not possible to take a picture. Oftentimes Buck, Director Elliott and the cameramen had to run for their lives, the animals being much too close for comfort.

== Reception ==
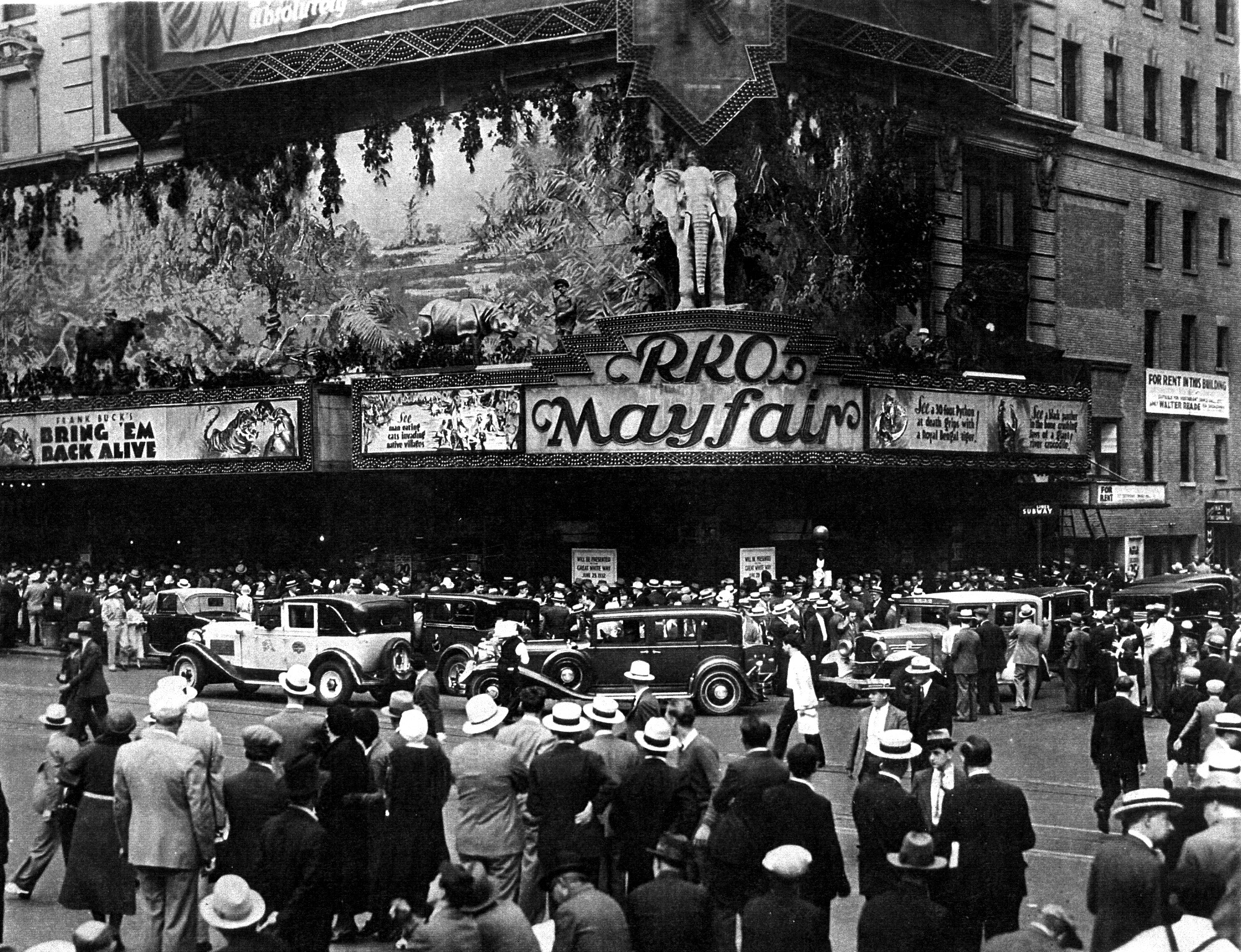
New York premiere of Bring 'Em Back Alive

The film brought in domestic rentals of $692,000 and foreign rentals of $352,000 and earned to its distributor, RKO, an estimated profit of $155,000.

"I shall never forget the premiere of the picture," Buck later recalled about the New York opening. "The R.K.O. officials had decided it was so good that they would give it a tremendous ballyhoo, take a private theatre (the Mayfair on Times Square) and do the job in Hollywood style. On the day of the opening there was a line of people four deep and a block long, fighting to get into the theatre. On the big marquee were full-sized papier-mâché elephants and tigers that actually moved and waved their trunks and snapped their jaws. I made personal appearances, and for the first time people saw the face of the man who had brought to zoos and menageries of America the animals they had marveled at for so many years."

== Radio series ==
Bring 'Em Back Alive was also the title of a radio series that aired on NBC October 30 – December 18, 1932, as promotion for the feature film. Buck described his adventures to sponsor Alfred Carlton Gilbert, manufacturer of the Erector Set, during the 15-minute program. Bring 'Em Back Alive was revived on the NBC Blue Network and NBC Red Network July 16 – November 16, 1934.

== In popular culture ==
In a 1973 episode of Adam-12, entitled “The Capture,” reference is made to this film, and specifically Frank Buck, as officers Malloy and Reed rescue a man in a diabetic coma who is guarded by a Dobermann.

The promotional poster for the movie was used by Tiger Army in 1999 as album art for their debut self-titled release.
