= Universal Newsreel =

20th century newsreels made by Universal Studios

- A 1962 Universal Newsreel on the 1st anniversary of the Berlin Wall's construction, narrated by Ed Herlihy
- Production company: Universal Studios
- Running time: 7–10 minutes

Universal Newsreel (sometimes known as Universal-International Newsreel or just U-I Newsreel) was a series of 7- to 10-minute newsreels that were released twice a week between 1929 and 1967 by Universal Studios. A Universal publicity official, Sam B. Jacobson, was involved in originating and producing the newsreels. Nearly all of them were filmed in black-and-white, and many were narrated by Ed Herlihy. From January 1919 to July 1929, Universal released International Newsreel, produced by Hearst's International News Service—this series later became Hearst Metrotone News released first by Fox Film Corporation 1929–1934 and then by Metro-Goldwyn-Mayer beginning in 1934.

In 1974, the films' owner, MCA, made the decision to donate all its edited newsreels and outtakes collection to the National Archives, without copyright restrictions. The decision effectively released the films into the public domain, although some stories may contain other underlying intellectual property or proprietary use rights. Because royalties no longer have to be paid in order to broadcast them, Universal Newsreels have become a popular source of file footage. The History Channel made them a key part of the TV series Year-By-Year. Also, C-SPAN and CNN regularly use the films for video of events that took place before those networks were founded. Nevertheless, much of the footage was lost in the 1978 National Archives vault fire which destroyed about 12.6 million feet of 35mm black and white negatives, or about 70% of the MCA-U donation. Most of the nitrate film was irreplaceable single-copy outtakes from WWII that had never been seen by the public.

Also in the United Kingdom as Universal News from 1930 to 1959, a successor to Empire News Bulletin, and in Ireland as Universal Irish News, both are currently held (including British Paramount News) under Reuters archive.

Other U.S. newsreel series included Pathé News (1910–1956), Fox Movietone News (1928–1963), Hearst Metrotone News/News of the Day (1914–1967), Paramount News (1927–1957), and The March of Time (1935–1951).
