= Walton C. Ament =

American film producer

- Born: January 7, 1907; Wilmerding, Pennsylvania
- Died: January 23, 1968 (aged 61); Washington, DC
- Occupations: attorney, film producer
- Known for: work with Frank Buck
- Spouse: Mary Alicia Nickerson (1937–1968, his death)
- Awards: plaque from War Activities Committee, 1946, for voluntary war services

Walton C. Ament (January 7, 1907 - January 23, 1968) was an attorney and film executive who produced Frank Buck's film Jungle Cavalcade. Ament was an outspoken champion of newsreels. "The newsreel has not lost its vitality. It is not obsolescent. Never has it been more important," he wrote in 1944. In 1946 Ament received a plaque from the War Activities Committee for voluntary war services.

== Early years ==
Walton C. Ament was the son of James McKeag Ament, listed on the 1920 US census as a chauffeur, and Ida May Campbell Ament. Walton graduated from Pennsylvania State College and Harvard Law School. He worked for the law firm Donovan, Leisure, Newton, and Lumbard in New York.

== Film career ==
In 1939 Ament was appointed an editor at Pathé News. He was subsequently vice president, then vice president and general manager. During his tenure, he was nominated for an Academy Award for Best Live Action Short Film for producing Spills and Chills, Sports News Review Series. He also produced Frank Buck's film Jungle Cavalcade.

== Personal life and death ==
Walton C. Ament was married to Mary Alicia Nickerson, the daughter of investment banker John Nickerson. The couple had three daughters. Walton Ament died in Washington, DC after a long illness.
