= 1965 MGM vault fire =

1965 fire in California, U.S.

- Date: August 10, 1965
- Location: Metro-Goldwyn-Mayer studio, Culver City, California
- Cause: Ignition of stored nitrate film by electrical short
- Outcome: Destruction of archived Metro-Goldwyn-Mayer silent and early sound films
- Deaths: 1 (reported)

On August 10, 1965, a fire erupted in Vault 7, a storage facility at the Metro-Goldwyn-Mayer studio (MGM) backlot (now Sony Pictures Studios) in Culver City, California. It was caused by an electrical short that ignited flammable stored nitrate film. The initial explosion reportedly killed at least one person, and the resulting fire destroyed the entire contents of the vault, which included archived prints of silent and early sound films produced by MGM and its predecessors. The only known copies of hundreds of films were destroyed.

== Background ==
The storage vaults, located on Lot 3, were spaced apart from one another to prevent fire from spreading between vaults. Studio manager Roger Mayer described the vaults as "concrete bunk houses" and stated that it was considered at the time as "good storage because [the films] couldn't be stolen". The vaults were not equipped with sprinkler systems and each had only a small fan in the roof for ventilation. However, Mayer believed that a sprinkler system would have made little difference because "the amount [the studio] lost by fire was minimal".

Unlike most major studios, MGM sought to preserve its early productions and those of its predecessors Metro Pictures, Goldwyn Pictures and Louis B. Mayer Productions, as well as prints of films purchased for remake value. The studio did not participate in the common practice of purposeful destruction of its catalog and even sought to preserve films of little apparent commercial value. Beginning in the 1930s, MGM donated prints and negatives of its silent films to film archives, predominantly George Eastman House, and in the early 1960s, it began a preservation program led by Mayer to transfer nitrate film prints onto safety film.

== Fire ==
Shortly before 10:00 p.m. on the evening of August 10, 1965, an electrical short ignited nitrate film stored in Vault 7 located on Lot 3, triggering a major explosion and fire that caused the ceiling of the vault to collapse onto the stored cans of film. The initial explosion could be heard from Lots 1 and 2, as recounted by film historian Rudy Behlmer, who was walking between them at the time. Executive Roger Mayer stated that at least one person died in the explosion, although a contemporary newspaper article states that there were no fatalities. The fire was extinguished, but none of the films stored inside the vault were salvaged.

Because of MGM's efforts to preserve its catalog of silent and early sound films, 68% of silent films produced by MGM have survived, the highest rate of any major studio. However, the fire destroyed the only known copies of numerous silent films, including Lon Chaney's A Blind Bargain (1922) and London After Midnight (1927) as well as Greta Garbo's The Divine Woman (1928).

== See also ==
- 1937 Fox vault fire
- 1978 National Archives vault fire
- 2008 Universal Studios fire
- List of lost films
- List of incomplete or partially lost films
- List of rediscovered films
