= Leroy G. Phelps =

American cinematographer

- Leroy G. Phelps
- Born: April 27, 1892; New York City, U.S.
- Died: February 16, 1964 (aged 71); Freeport, Long Island, U.S.
- Occupation: cinematographer
- Known for: work with Frank Buck
- Spouse(s): Minerva Phelps (divorced 1949); Elfrida Johnson Phelps

Leroy Garfield Phelps (April 27, 1892 – February 16, 1964) was an American cinematographer who filmed Frank Buck’s second movie, Wild Cargo.

== Early career ==
Phelps was official photographer of Yale University from 1920 to 1932. A year later, he accompanied Frank Buck to India, Ceylon, Sumatra and Malaya, where he filmed Wild Cargo.

== Work with Frank Buck ==
While making Wild Cargo, Phelps was nearly crippled by an infection he acquired after scratching himself on a poisonous renghus tree in the jungle. Buck and Phelps were almost trampled by a herd of stampeding water buffalo, and were spared only when the animals changed direction at the last moment. Phelps was cinematographer for some of the sequences in Buck's 1941 film Jungle Cavalcade.

== Later career ==
Phelps joined the Armand Denis- Leila Roosevelt Expedition to Africa and the Far East, and was associate producer of Wheels Across Africa, Wheels Across India and Dangerous Journey. He also provided cinematography to Out of Evil.

== South Seas Documentary ==
While acting as a civilian pool photographer for the atomic bomb tests at Bikini Atoll, Phelps made a documentary film of the inhabitants of Likiep Atoll, which was selected for preservation by the Library of Congress.

== Death ==
Phelps died at his home in Freeport, Long Island. He is buried in Greenfield Cemetery, Hempstead, Long Island.
