= Fang and Claw =

- The theatrical film poster.
- Directed by: Frank Buck
- Written by: Frank Buck, Ferrin Fraser (uncredited)
- Produced by: Amedee J. Van Beuren
- Starring: Frank Buck
- Narrated by: Frank Buck
- Cinematography: Harry E. Squire, Nicholas Cavaliere
- Edited by: Horace Woodard, Stacy Woodard
- Music by: Winston Sharples
- Distributed by: RKO Pictures
- Release date: December 20, 11935
- Running time: 68 or 73-74 minutes
- Country: United States
- Language: English

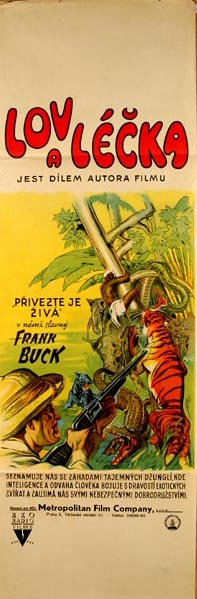
The Czech poster for the film.

Fang and Claw is a 1935 jungle adventure documentary starring Frank Buck, based on the 1935 book of the same name. Buck continues his demonstration of the ingenious methods by which he traps wild birds, mammals and reptiles in Johore.

== Scenes ==
Among the scenes in the film:

- Buck shoots a tiger attacking a young rhino and captures the rhino.
- Buck captures a bird of paradise
- Buck captures a 24-foot (7.3 m) python by shooting off the tree limb supporting the snake
- Buck captures a large group of monkeys by luring them with tapioca.”

== Behind the camera ==
The film took nine months to make. Python cinematographer Harry E. Squire was helping Buck go into a box that left a 4-inch (100 mm) wound on Squire’s right arm.

== Reception ==
“The intrepid Mr. Buck displays his ingenuity and courage…Fang and Claw will be welcomed by the youngsters."

The film made a profit of $46,000 for RKO.
