= Horace Woodard =

American film producer and cinematographer

- Born: Horace Land Woodard; August 18, 1904; Salt Lake City, Utah, U.S.
- Died: April 20, 1973 (aged 68); Los Angeles, California, U.S.
- Occupations: Producer and cinematographer
- Years active: 1934-1951

Horace Woodard (August 18, 1904 – April 20, 1973) was an American film producer and cinematographer of short films.

== Career ==
He won at the 7th Academy Awards along with his brother Stacy Woodard for the category of Best Live Action Short-Novelty, for the film City of Wax.

== Filmography ==
With the exception of Monsieur Fabre these are all short films.

- Monsieur Fabre (1951) (Cinematographer)
- The Negro Soldier (1945) (Cinematographer) (credited as Capt. Horace Woodard)
- Adventures of Chico (1938) (Cinematographer, producer, editor and director)
- Neptune Mysteries: The Struggle to Live Series (1935) (Cinematographer and writer)
- Fang and Claw (1935) (Editor)
- Born to Die (1934) (Producer)
- City of Wax (1934) (Producer)
