= Leila Roosevelt =

American film producer

- Born: 1906
- Died: 1976 (aged 69–70)
- Parent: André Roosevelt
- Family: See Roosevelt family

Leila Roosevelt (1906–1976) was an American-born producer, director and screenwriter.

== Early life ==
1906 Roosevelt was born. Roosevelt's father was André Roosevelt, a French-born American filmmaker. His father was Cornelius Roosevelt (1847–1902), a cousin of U.S. President Theodore Roosevelt.

== Filmography ==
- 1938 Magie africaine - Writer, Producer.
- 1944 Dangerous Journey - Producer, Director.

== Personal life ==
Roosevelt was married to Armand Denis, a Belgium-born filmmaker. They had 4 children, Rene, David, Armand, and Heidi Ann.
