= Michaela Denis =

British-born wildlife documentary film-maker and presenter

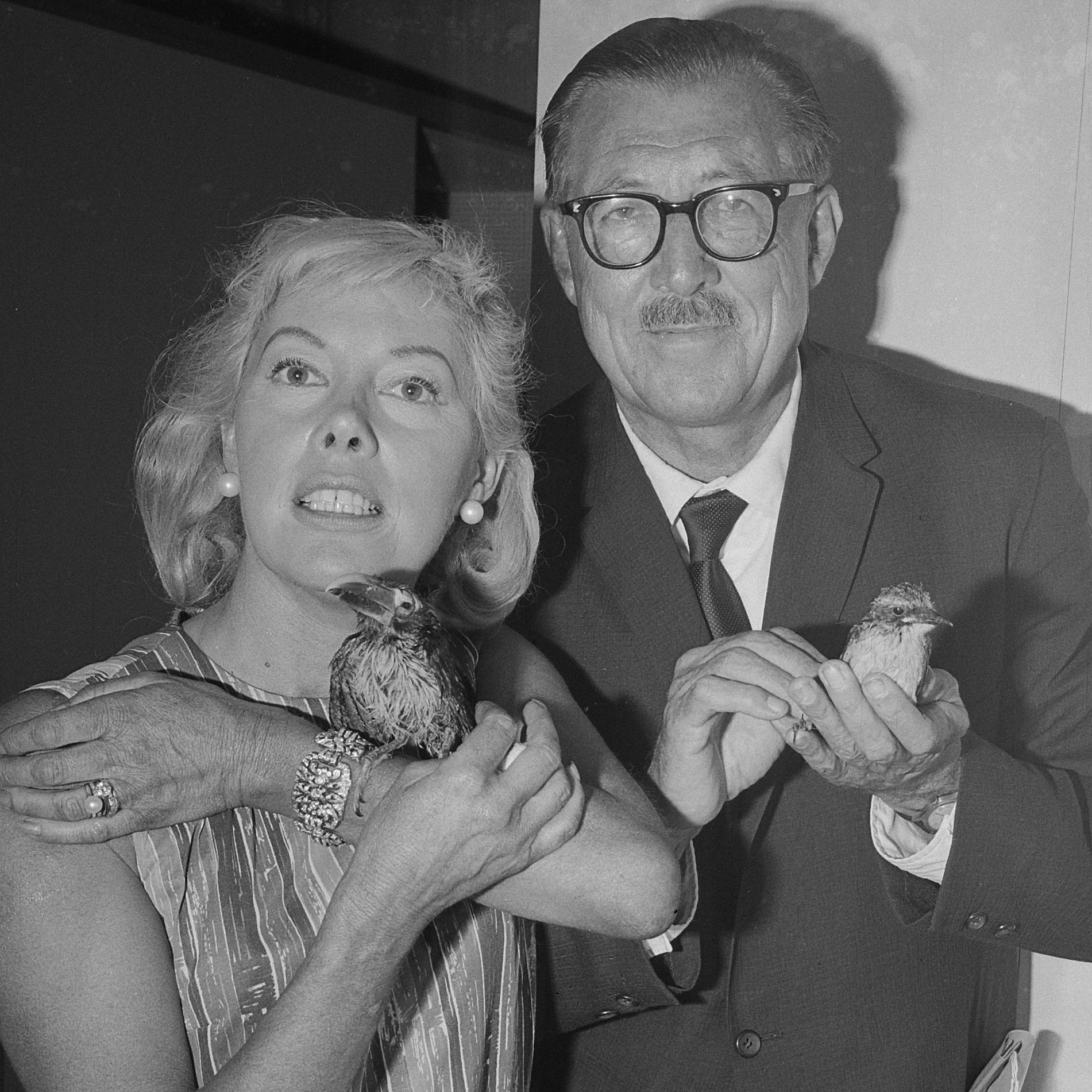
Michaela and Armand Denis (1962)

Michaela Denis (née Holdsworth; 28 August 1914 – 4 May 2003) was a British-born wildlife documentary film-maker and presenter, who worked with her husband, Armand Denis.

== Life ==
Michaela Holdsworth was born in London, and brought up by her White Russian mother and grandmother after her father, an archaeologist, was killed in the First World War when she was three months old. She won a scholarship to fashion school, and trained as a dress designer in Paris, returning to London at the outbreak of the Second World War. She then became engaged to an American admiral and travelled to New York, but after some time in America, and after delaying her wedding, she met and began an affair with Armand Denis, a Belgian-born adventurer and filmmaker who had already had wide experience of making documentary films in remote areas around the world, many made with his first wife, Leila (Roosevelt) Denis. Armand and Leila Denis divorced, and, in 1948, Michaela and Armand were married by special licence in Potosi, Bolivia.

In order to finance their plans to make wildlife documentaries, the couple travelled to Africa in 1950 to work on the feature film, King Solomon's Mines, in which Michaela acted as Deborah Kerr's double. In 1953 they made a new film together, Below The Sahara, and appeared on BBC radio to promote it. The BBC saw the couple's potential for television work, and in 1954 they produced a pioneering and successful TV programme, Filming Wild Animals. The quality of Armand Denis' film-making, combined with his heavy accent and Michaela's enthusiasm and glamorous appeal, made them fixtures on BBC TV screens in Britain during the 1950s and early 1960s. Accompanied by Armand's commentary, the two would be filmed getting as close to animals as possible, in a style later much parodied. Typically, there would be a trademark moment for Michaela to apply lipstick or comb her hair; she once commented that she could not possibly get into the water with crocodiles until she had put on her eyebrow pencil. The couple made several series for both BBC and ITV, including Filming In Africa (1955), Armand and Michaela Denis (1955-58), On Safari (1957-59), and Safari to Asia (1959-61), which were repeated until well into the 1960s. She published such books as Leopard in My Lap (1955) and Ride on a Rhino (1960).

The couple made their home in Nairobi, Kenya. Armand Denis died in 1971. Michaela then apparently discovered she had healing powers, and opened a spiritual healing clinic at their home. In 1975 she married her lawyer, Sir William O'Brien Lindsay, the former Chief Justice of the Sudan, who died in his sleep three months later. She also dealt in property in Kenya.

Michaela Denis died in Nairobi in 2003, aged 88.
