= Maritz, LLC =

Sales and marketing services company

Maritz
- Type: Private
- Industry: Incentives; Rewards; Loyalty; Engagement; Business Events
- Founded: 1894; 132 years ago
- Founder: Edward Maritz
- Headquarters: Fenton, Missouri, United States
- Area served: Worldwide
- Key people: Steve Maritz (Executive Chairman) David Peckinpaugh (CEO) Holly Francois (CFO) Jill Blood (Chief Legal Officer)
- Number of employees: 4,250 (2016)
- Subsidiaries: Maritz Global Events, Maritz Motivation, Maritz Automotive, Quality Reward Travel
- Website: www.maritz.com

Maritz is a sales and marketing services company that designs and operates employee recognition and reward programs, sales channel incentive programs, (including incentive travel rewards) and customer loyalty programs. It also plans corporate & association trade shows, meetings and events, and offers a customer experience technology platform.

Subsidiaries and segments include Maritz Motivation, Maritz Global Events, Maritz Automotive, Quality Reward Travel, and Impact Dimensions.

== History ==
In 1894, Edward Maritz started the E. Maritz Jewelry Manufacturing Company, a wholesaler and manufacturer of fine jewelry and engraved watches. By the 1920s, the company was concentrating on wholesaling imported watches and became one of the first in the nation to sell wristwatches. When the stock market crashed in 1929, the company nearly failed. The crisis forced Maritz to look for a new direction, and it began to sell watches, jewelry and merchandise to large corporations as sales incentives and service awards for employees.

Over the next three decades, the sales incentive business flourished. Each year, Maritz produced an increasingly elaborate merchandise awards catalog and added services to promote and administer sales incentive programs. With the purchase of a small Detroit travel company in the 1950s, Maritz branched out again, adding group travel as an incentive award. As the 1960s ended, Maritz began to diversify with new divisions that laid the groundwork for ventures in communications, marketing research, training and meeting production.

The company further diversified in the 1970s. Maritz built communications and marketing research businesses, established a presence in Europe and opened a travel office in Mexico City.

In the 1990s Maritz invested in automotive marketing research. They formed Maritz Canada and added offices throughout Western Europe. During the late 1990s and into the new millennium, Maritz continued to grow in loyalty reward and incentive travel through strategic partnerships with companies such as American Express.

In 2008, Maritz claimed to be the largest source of integrated performance improvement, travel and market research services globally.

In May 2014, Maritz Canada and Maritz Loyalty Marketing rebranded to form North America's first brand loyalty agency, Bond Brand Loyalty. The focus of the new agency was to help clients manage customer-brand relationships. The company sold Bond Brand Loyalty in 2015. Also in 2014, Maritz Holdings acquired Allegiance Software in order to combine it with Maritz Research and create a new, standalone company, MaritzCX, a customer experience and market research company.

On March 3, 2020 MaritzCX was sold to InMoment.

On July 8, 2024, Maritz acquired Convention Data Services (CDS)from Freeman.
