= Harry E. Squire =

American cinematographer

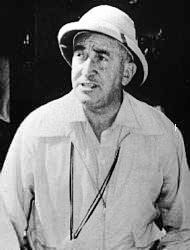
- Born: 2 February 1890; Hudson, New Jersey
- Died: July 1977 (aged 87); Eagle Bridge, Washington, New York, USA
- Other name: Harold Edmund Squire
- Occupation: cinematographer
- Known for: work with Frank Buck and Cinerama
- Spouse: Eleanor Steinan Squire (b 1889, married 1915)
- Children: Audrey Squire (b 1917)

Harry E. Squire (1890-1977) was an American cinematographer. He is best known for his work filming and photographing This is Cinerama and other features in Cinerama, Seven Wonders of the World, and Search for Paradise.

== Career ==
=== Early years ===
Squire began his career with an apprenticeship of driving the camera automobile used for filming crowd scenes in Staten Island. Squire worked in the film studios of Thomas Edison in the Bronx and filmed some of Edison's one reelers, as well as early sound films. Squire moved to Paramount Pictures and filmed some of the earliest documentary and newsreel films. Van Beuren Studios hired him to photograph Fang and Claw with Frank Buck.

=== Work on Fang and Claw ===
The film took nine months to make. A 27-foot-long (8.2 m) python Squire was helping Buck to force into a box left a 4-inch (100 mm) wound on Squire's right arm.

=== Later career ===
Squire worked for Fox Movietone News, and later photographed the Cinerama features This Is Cinerama, Cinerama Holiday, Seven Wonders of the World, and Search for Paradise.

== Personal life ==
In his final years, Squire lived in Eagle Bridge, New York, next door to Grandma Moses.
