= Stacy Woodard =

American film director

- Born: Stacy Robert Woodard; June 11, 1902; Salt Lake City, Utah, U.S.
- Died: January 27, 1942 (aged 39); New York City, New York, U.S.
- Occupations: producer, cinematographer, film editor
- Known for: nature films, work with Frank Buck
- Spouse: Margaret Woodard
- Awards: Academy awards for short pictures City of Wax and "The Sea."

Stacy Robert Woodard (June 11, 1902 in Salt Lake City, Utah – January 27, 1942 in New York City) was a producer, cinematographer, and editor of nature films, who with his brother Horace Woodard edited Frank Buck's film Fang and Claw.

== Early years ==
Stacy Woodard was the son of Robert F. Woodard, listed as a gasoline salesman on the 1910 US Census, and Christine Woodard. Stacy was educated at the Universities of Chicago and Arizona, specializing in biology. Before entering motion pictures he took part in surveys in the West and Alaska.

== Film career ==
The two brothers, Stacy and Horace Woodard, cooperated in every aspect of the making of the "Struggle to Live" series of one-reel films, produced for Educational Pictures and distributed by Fox Film Corporation (Struggle for Life, Life in the Deep, Born to Die, and Man, the Enigma), sharing the producing, writing, photographing, directing, and editing. These pictures displayed the masterly use of the microscopic camera, devised by Stacy Woodard, a huge apparatus weighing two tons, erected in the garage of its inventor's Santa Monica home. In one film, massed regiments of ants were seen assailing entrenched termites; a second recorded the fights between desert insects and animals; a third, City of Wax, showed the life of the bee. However, Woodard has since been criticized for staging unnatural insect battles by forcing the creatures together in very small spaces.

Stacy Woodard, the elder of the two brothers by two years, photographed The River (1938), the under-sea portion of Samarang (1933) and the whaling portion of I Conquer the Sea. The brothers shared two Academy awards for their short pictures, City of Wax (1934) and The Sea. The entire expedition that went to Mexico to make The Adventures of Chico (1938), the story of a small Mexican boy and his animal friends, consisted of Stacy and Horace Woodard and two cameras with lenses, reflectors and reels of negative.

Amadee J. Van Beuren co-produced some of the Woodard brothers' nature films, and hired the two men to edit Frank Buck's film Fang and Claw.

== Later years and death ==
Stacy Woodard lived in the Palace Hotel, San Francisco. He died in New York City at the home of a friend at 10 Monroe Street in Knickerbocker Village. His body was found lying on the floor of the kitchen, the medical examiner later stating that death resulted from natural causes (heart attack). Woodard had recently returned from Texas and Louisiana, where he had made a series of short films for the Shell Oil Company. He is buried at Forest Lawn Memorial Park, Glendale, Vesperland Section, map 01, lot 2047, space 3 (ground).
