= Armand Denis =

Belgian film director

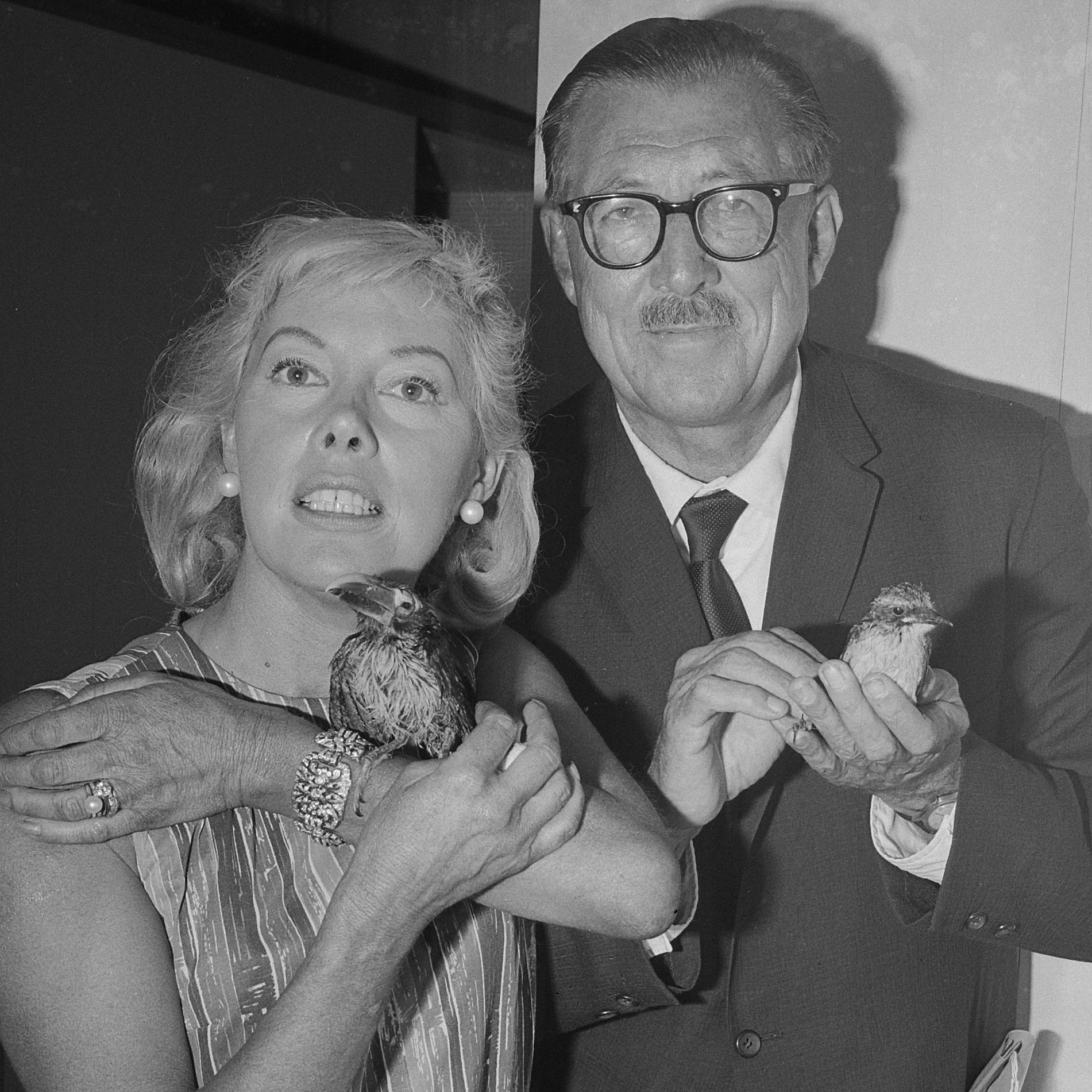
- Armand Denis with second wife Michaela
- Born: Armand Georges Denis; 2 December 1896; Brussels, Belgium
- Died: 15 April 1971 (aged 74); Nairobi, Kenya
- Occupations: Documentary filmmaker, TV wildlife presenter
- Years active: 1931-1960
- Spouse(s): Leila Roosevelt; Michaela Holdsworth

Armand Georges Denis (2 December 1896 – 15 April 1971) was a Belgian-born documentary filmmaker. After several decades of pioneering work in filming and presenting the ethnology and wildlife of remote parts of Africa and Asia, he became best known in Britain as the director and co-presenter of natural history programmes on television in the 1950s and 1960s, with his second wife Michaela.

== Life ==
=== Childhood and early career as a scientist and inventor ===
He was born in Brussels, Belgium (though the family moved to Antwerp soon after his birth), the son of a judge, and developed an interest in travel and the natural world as a child. He fought in the First World War before escaping to England, where he read chemistry at Oxford University. He worked at the Royal Aircraft Establishment, Farnborough on lubricating oils, and then in Belgium on coke oven technology, before moving to the United States. There, in 1926, he invented a system of automatic volume control for radio, and the royalties he received allowed him to indulge his love of travel and movie-making.

=== First success as a filmmaker ===
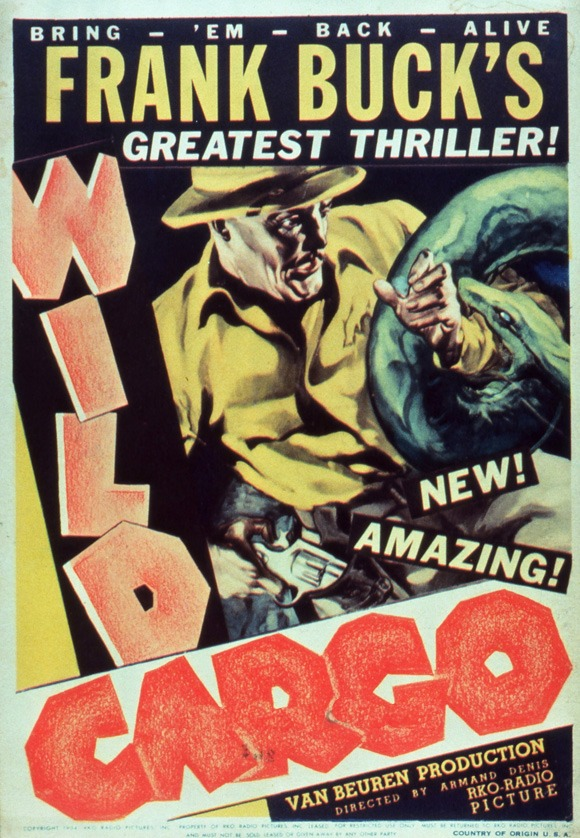
Original poster for Wild Cargo

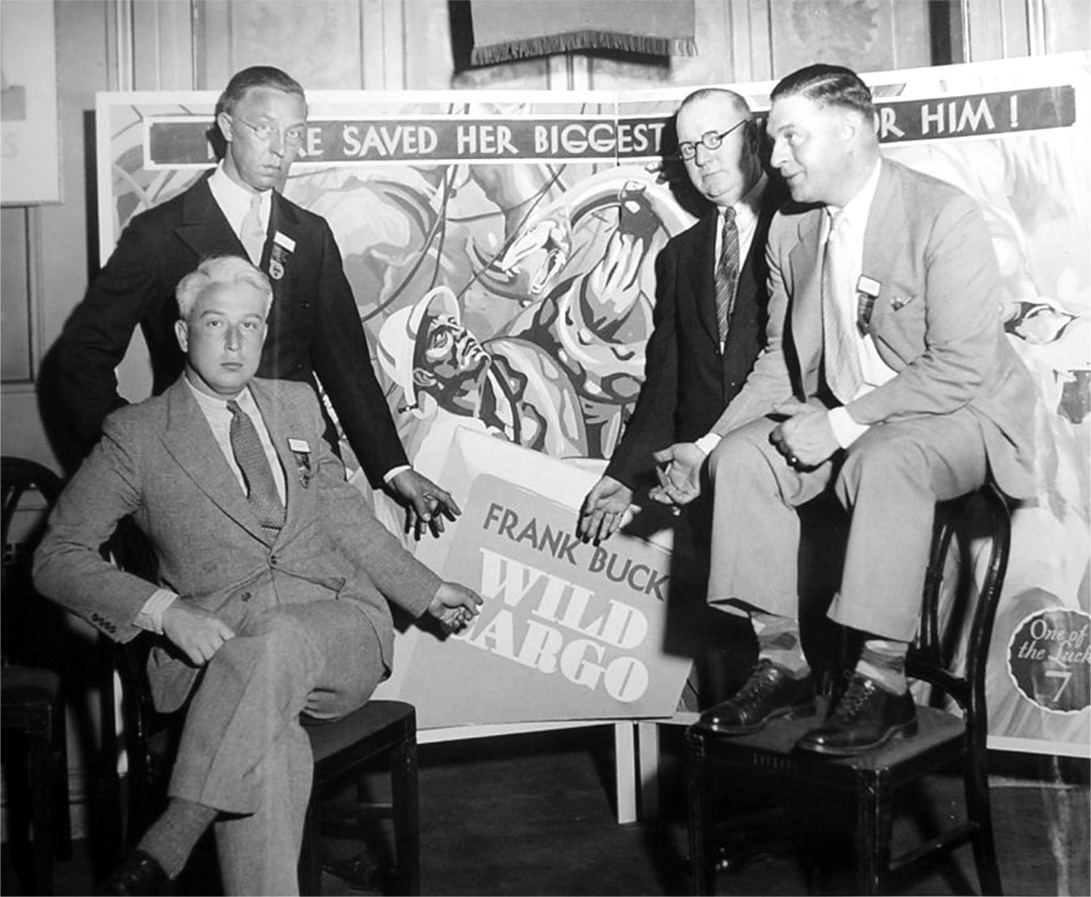
Armand Denis (seated right) with RKO exhibitors and poster for Wild Cargo ca 1934

After moving to Hollywood he worked as a cameraman, and began film-making with André Roosevelt, a first cousin once-removed of Theodore Roosevelt. In 1928, Denis and Roosevelt traveled to Bali to make Goona Goona (also known as The Kriss), a compilation of authentic expedition footage with a dramatic plotline involving a romance between a Balinese prince and a servant girl. The movie was first released in 1930 and in a version called Love Powder, edited to conform to American censorship restrictions, in 1932. It started a craze for all things Balinese, and "Goona-goona", originally a Javanese term for love magic, became a slang expression for "sexually exciting". The film's success brought Denis to the attention of the cinema industry, and in 1934 he directed Wild Cargo, starring adventurer and animal collector Frank Buck.

=== Work with Leila Roosevelt Denis ===
Denis married André Roosevelt's daughter Leila (1906-1976); they went on to have four children (Rene, David, Armand & Heidi Ann). In 1934–35, sponsored by the Belgian government, the couple travelled to the (then) Belgian Congo with the cinematographer Leroy G. Phelps, to record sound film material suitable for use in African movies. They recorded a wide variety of footage, including the first film of the music and dances of the Mangbetu and Tutsi (Watusi) peoples. The soundtracks were released as commercial recordings, and the movie material, from the Congo and the Sahara, was edited for release as Wheels Across Africa in 1936, and as Dark Rapture in 1938.

Armand and Leila continued to work together on short documentaries through the late 1930s, and in 1944 put together the movie Dangerous Journey covering their travels in Africa, India and Burma.

=== Armand and Michaela ===
However, in 1948, Armand Denis met British dress designer Michaela Holdsworth in New York. They began an affair and, after he and Leila divorced, Armand and Michaela married in Bolivia.

In order to finance their independent work, the couple travelled to Africa in 1950 to work on the feature film, King Solomon's Mines, in which Michaela acted as Deborah Kerr's double. In 1953 they made a new film together, Below the Sahara, and appeared on BBC radio to promote it. The BBC saw the couple's potential for television work, and in 1954 they produced a successful TV programme, Filming Wild Animals.

The quality of Armand Denis' film-making, combined with his heavy accent and Michaela's enthusiasm and glamorous appeal, made them fixtures on BBC TV screens during the 1950s and early 1960s, revolutionising wildlife documentaries on television. They made several series for both BBC and ITV, including Filming In Africa (1955), Armand and Michaela Denis (1955–58), On Safari (1957–59), and Safari to Asia (1959–61), which were repeated until well into the 1960s. Their early collaborations relied on the couple travelling alone in a Land Rover with technical equipment, presenting material in a style that was much parodied, but in later series it became clear that they used a team of cameramen.

In January 1963, Armand Denis was the first editor of Animals magazine, which later became BBC Wildlife.

=== Later life ===
The couple made their home in Nairobi, Kenya. Armand Denis published an autobiography, On Safari: the story of my life in 1963. He died from Parkinson's disease in 1971. Michaela married Sir William O'Brien Lindsay in 1975, three months before his death; she died in 2003.

== Filmography ==
1930 Goona Goona (also known as The Kris) (with André Roosevelt)
1934 Wild Cargo (Frank Buck’s second movie)

=== With Leila Roosevelt Denis ===
1936 Wheels Across Africa
1937 Wheels Across India
1938 Magie Africaine (also known as Dark Rapture)
1941 Bring 'Em Back Alive
1941 Jungle Cavalcade (Frank Buck’s fourth movie)
1944 Dangerous Journey
1949 Savage Splendor

=== With Michaela Denis ===
1949 Wheels Across Australia
1953 Below the Sahara
1954 Armand and Michaela Denis Under The Southern Cross
1955 Armand and Michaela Denis Among The Headhunters
1955 Armand and Michaela Denis On The Barrier Reef

== Bibliography ==
- Taboo, Berkley Books, 1966
