= Pamela Rush =

American activist (died 2020)

- Born: Pamela Sue Rush; Lowndes County, Alabama, U.S.
- Died: July 2020; Selma, Alabama, U.S.
- Years active: 2018–2020

Pamela Sue Rush (died July 2020) was an American poverty, civil rights, and environmental justice activist who lived in rural Tyler, Alabama, and who fought against poverty and inequality.

== Early life ==
Rush was born and raised in Lowndes County, Alabama, where 72 percent of residents are Black and more than 25 percent of residents live in poverty. Her ancestors were slaves.

== Activism ==
In 2018, Catherine Coleman Flowers, Rush's cousin and founder of the Center for Rural Enterprise and Environmental Justice, grew closer when Rush's sister asked Coleman Flowers to help Rush find a better place to live. At the time, Rush was living in a neighborhood that was built on former slave quarter. The poverty she experienced can be traced back to the legacy of slavery in the Southern Black Belt. Rush lived in a dilapidated mobile home with raw sewage. Coleman Flowers connected Rush with Rev. Dr. William Barber II, which led to Rush becoming an active member and one of the faces of the New Poor People’s Campaign led by Barber II and Rev. Dr. Liz Theoharis. In 2018, Rush spoke to Southerly Magazine, discussing the flooding, lack of proper sewage, and how her children were unable to play outside due to health concerns.

Rush testified before a coalition of several members of Congress led by Senator Elizabeth Warren. In 2019, Senator Bernie Sanders, who had been part of the Washington forum on poverty at which Rush had testified, visited her home.

She became an activist for poor people in rural areas and was featured in several publications including NPR, The Economist and Time magazine. Both Jane Fonda and Kat Taylor, wife of former presidential candidate Tom Steyer, traveled to Tyler to meet with her and discuss the problems faced by those living in poverty.

== Personal life ==
Rush lived in a mobile home in Tyler, Alabama, with her two children, a son and a daughter. She was the victim of predatory lending and paid more than four times the value of her mobile home in high interest fees. Rush received disability payments and lived on a fixed income of less than $1,000 a month.

== Death ==
Rush had diabetes and contracted COVID-19 during the COVID-19 pandemic in Alabama. She was hospitalized in Selma, Alabama, for two weeks. Lowndes County, where Pamela lived, had the highest rate of COVID-19 cases in the state of Alabama. Rush died as a result of the illness in July 2020, at the age of 49.
