= Theoharis =

Theoharis is a surname. Notable people with the surname include:

- Amber Theoharis (born 1978), American television host
- Athan Theoharis (1936–2021), American historian
- Jeanne Theoharis, American political scientist
- Liz Theoharis (born 1976), American Presbyterian minister and activist
