= SECA =

SECA, SecA or Seca may refer to:

- Société Européenne de Contrôle d'Accès, now Nagra France
- The SECA Mediaguard encryption system, designed by the above company.
- Society for the Encouragement of Contemporary Art, an auxiliary part of the San Francisco Museum of Modern Art
  - The SECA Art Awards granted by this Society
- Southern Early Childhood Association (SECA)
- Solid State Energy Conversion Alliance (SECA)
- Seča, a village in the Municipality of Piran, southwestern Slovenia
- Seca GmbH & Co. KG., a German company
- SecA protein - an ATPase in the bacterial translocase pathway
- SecA or secondary average, baseball statistic
- Sulphur Emission Control Area: areas of the North Sea and the California coast where low-sulphur heavy fuel oil must be used aboard ships, as defined in MARPOL Annex VI.
- Self Employment Contributions Act, a payroll tax on self-employed workers in the United States similar to FICA.
- The ICAO code for Ciudad de Catamayo Airport in Catamayo, Ecuador.
- The Swedish Economic Crime Authority (SECA or EBM, Ekobrottsmyndigheten).
