= Westbrook Pegler =

American journalist and writer

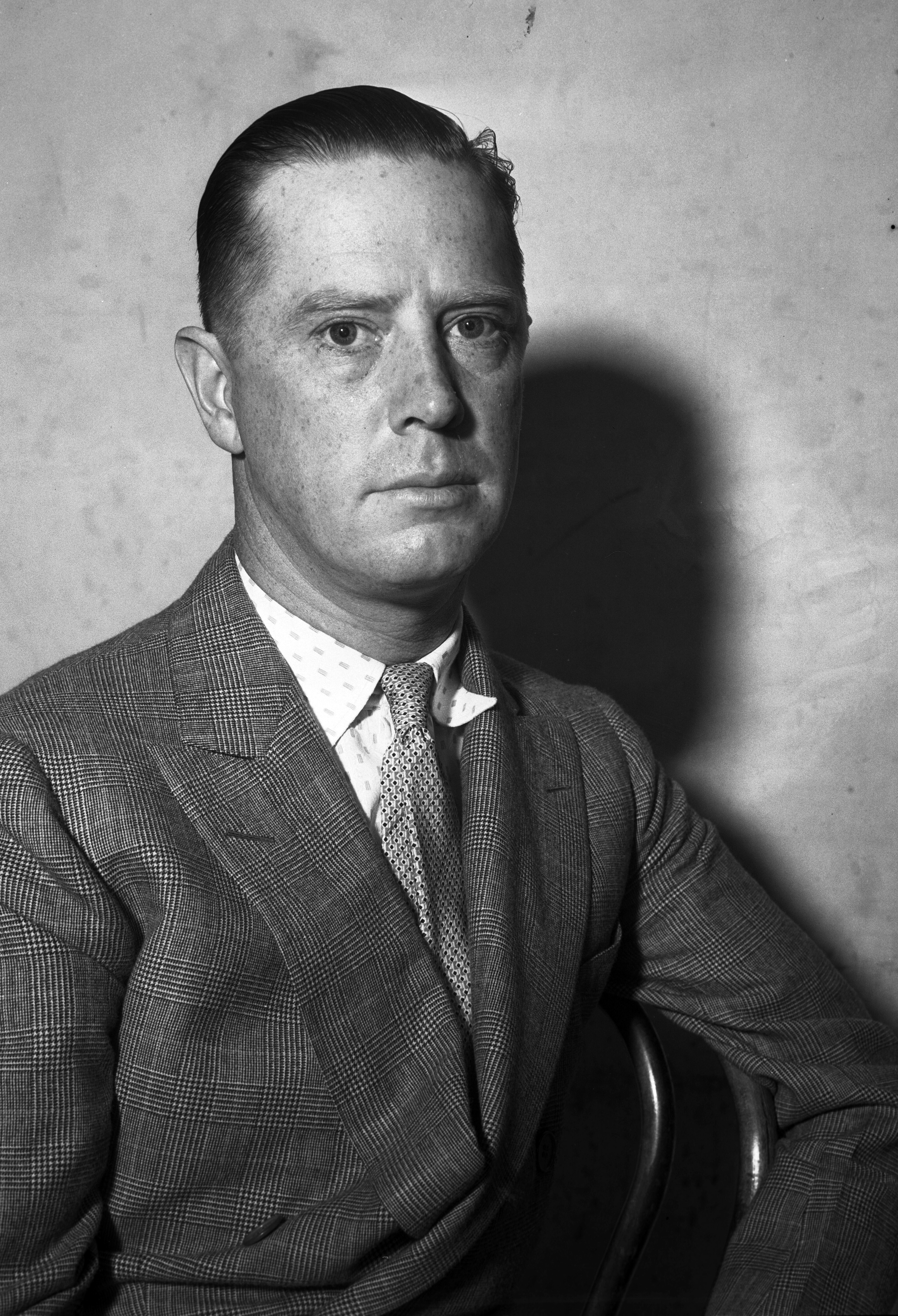
- Born: Francis James Westbrook Pegler; August 2, 1894; Minneapolis, Minnesota, U.S.
- Died: June 24, 1969 (aged 74); Tucson, Arizona, U.S.
- Occupation: syndicated newspaper columnist
- Spouse(s): Julia Harpman Pegler (first), Maude Wettje Pegler (second)
- Writing career
- Pen name: Westbrook Pegler

Francis James Westbrook Pegler (August 2, 1894 – June 24, 1969) was a Pulitzer Prize-winning American journalist described as "one of the godfathers of right-wing populism". He was a newspaper columnist popular in the 1930s and 1940s for his opposition to the New Deal, labor unions, and anti-lynching legislation.

As an ardent proponent of states' rights, Pegler criticized a variety of targets whom he saw as extending the reach of the federal government, including Herbert Hoover, FDR ("moosejaw"), Harry Truman ("a thin-lipped hater"), and John F. Kennedy. He also criticized the Supreme Court, the tax system, labor unions, and any federal intervention on the issue of civil rights. In 1962, he lost his contract with King Features Syndicate, owned by the Hearst Corporation, after he started criticizing Hearst executives. His late writing appeared sporadically in publications that included the John Birch Society's American Opinion.

== Background ==
James Westbrook Pegler was born on August 2, 1894, in Minneapolis, Minnesota, the son of Frances A. (Nicholson) and Arthur James Pegler, a local newspaper editor.

=== Journalism career ===
Westbrook Pegler was the youngest American war correspondent during World War I, working for United Press Service. In 1918, he joined the United States Navy. In 1919, he became a sports writer for United News (New York).

In 1925, Pegler joined the Chicago Tribune. In 1933, he joined the Scripps Howard syndicate (through 1944), with his inaugural column opposing the passage of an anti-lynching bill that was before Congress, in which he first coined the term "bleeding heart liberal" to describe the proponents of the bill attempting to outlaw lynching at the federal level.

Pegler worked closely with his friend Roy Howard. He built up a large readership for his column "Mister Pegler" and elicited this observation by Time magazine in its October 10, 1938 issue:

At the age of 44, Mr. Mister Pegler's place as the great dissenter for the common man is unchallenged. Six days a week, for an estimated $65,000 a year, in 116 papers reaching nearly 6,000,000 readers, Mister Pegler is invariably irritated, inexhaustibly scornful. Unhampered by coordinated convictions of his own, Pegler applies himself to presidents and peanut vendors with equal zeal and skill. Dissension is his philosophy.

In 1941, he won a Pulitzer Prize for exposing criminal racketeering in labor unions. The same year, he finished third (behind Franklin Roosevelt and Joseph Stalin) for Time‘s "Man of the Year."

In 1944, Pegler moved his syndicated column to the Hearst's King Features Syndicate. He continued there to 1962.

=== Contempt for Franklin Roosevelt ===
Pegler supported President Franklin Roosevelt initially but, after seeing the rise of fascism in Europe, he warned against the dangers of dictatorship in America and became one of the Roosevelt administration's sharpest critics for what he saw as its abuse of power. Thereafter he rarely missed an opportunity to criticize Roosevelt; his wife, Eleanor Roosevelt; or Vice President Henry A. Wallace. The New York Times stated in his obituary that Pegler lamented the failure of the would-be assassin Giuseppe Zangara, whose shot missed FDR and killed the mayor of Chicago instead. He "hit the wrong man" when gunning for Franklin Roosevelt.

Pegler's views became more conservative in general. He was outraged by the New Deal's support for labor unions, which he considered morally and politically corrupt.

=== Opposition to New Deal ===
At his peak in the 1930s and the 1940s, Pegler was a leading figure in the movement against the New Deal and its allies in the labor movement, such as the National Maritime Union. He compared union advocates of the closed shop to Hitler's "goose-steppers." The NMU sued Hearst and Associated Press for an article by Pegler, settled out of court for $10,000. In Pegler's view, the corrupt labor boss was the greatest threat to the country.

By the 1950s, Pegler was advocating the government dissolution of the AFL–CIO federation of unions. Admitting that while such an act would be fascistic in nature, he could, in his words, "see advantages in such fascism."

=== Support and recantion for removal of Japanese-Americans ===
At the beginning of World War II, Pegler expressed support for moving Japanese-Americans and Japanese citizens out of California: "The Japanese in California should be under guard to the last man and woman right now and to hell with habeas corpus until the danger is over." However, Pegler went on to recant his views and, in a column responding to the United States Supreme Court decision in Korematsu v. United States, denounced Chief Justice Hugo Black as a deceitful political hack who had started his career by joining the Ku Klux Klan "a murderous... gang of night riding racial and religious terrorists" to win votes and had never ceased violating the civil liberties of Americans such as the ethnic Japanese.

=== Feud with Eleanor Roosevelt ===
Westbrook Pegler (lower left) shared George T. Bye (upper right) as literary agent with Eleanor Roosevelt (lower right) and Deems Taylor (upper left), shown here at the home of Lowell Thomas at Quaker Lake, Pawling, New York (1938)

After 1942 Pegler assailed Franklin and Eleanor Roosevelt regularly, calling Mrs. Roosevelt "La boca grande", or "the big mouth". The Roosevelts ignored his writings, at least in public.

Recent scholars (including Kenneth O'Reilly, Betty Houchin Winfield, and Richard W. Steele) have reported that Franklin Roosevelt used the FBI for the purposes of wartime security, and ordered sedition investigations of isolationist and anti-New Deal newspaper publishers (such as William Randolph Hearst and the Chicago Tribune's Robert R. McCormick). On December 10, 1942, Roosevelt, citing evidence Eleanor Roosevelt had gathered, asked the FBI's J. Edgar Hoover to investigate Pegler, which it did; the bureau eventually reported that it had found no sedition. In the end, nothing came of it except Pegler's lifelong distaste for Eleanor Roosevelt, often expressed in his column.

=== Pulitzer Prize and anti-union activism ===
In 1941 Pegler became the first columnist to win a Pulitzer Prize for reporting, for his work in exposing racketeering in Hollywood labor unions, focusing on the criminal career of Willie Bioff and the link between organized crime and unions. Pegler's reporting led to the conviction of George Scalise, the president of the Building Service Employees International Union who had ties to organized crime. Scalise was indicted by New York District Attorney Thomas E. Dewey, charged with extorting $100,000 from employers from three years. Convicted of labor racketeering, Scalise was sentenced to 10–20 years in prison.

As historian David Witwer has concluded about Pegler, "He depicted a world where a conspiracy of criminals, corrupt union officials, Communists, and their political allies in the New Deal threatened the economic freedom of working Americans."

In the winter of 1947, Pegler started a campaign to draw public attention to the "Guru Letters" of former Vice-President Henry A. Wallace, claiming they showed Wallace's unfitness for the office of President he had announced he would seek in 1948. Pegler characterized Wallace as a "messianic fumbler", and "off-center mentally." There was a personal confrontation between the two men on the subject at a public meeting in Philadelphia in July 1948. Several reporters, including H. L. Mencken, joined in the increasingly aggressive questioning. Wallace declined to comment on the letters, while labelling some of the reporters "stooges" for Pegler. At the conclusion of the meeting, H. L. Mencken acidly suggested that every person named "Henry" should be put to death, offering to commit suicide if Wallace was executed first.

=== Controversy in later career ===
In the 1950s and 1960s, as Pegler's conservative views became more extreme and his writing increasingly shrill, he earned the tag of "the stuck whistle of journalism." Despite having earlier called for the desegregation of baseball, Pegler denounced the civil rights movement and in the early 1960s wrote for the John Birch Society. He aligned himself with the white supremacist White Citizens Council. He was ultimately expelled from the John Birch Society because of his extreme views. However, the Society did put his picture on the cover of its magazine, American Opinion, when he died.

President Harry S. Truman in his famous letter to Paul Hume, music critic for The Washington Post, referred to Pegler as a guttersnipe, and yet a gentleman compared to Hume, for the latter's criticizing his daughter Margaret's singing.

His attack on writer Quentin Reynolds led to a costly libel suit against him and his publishers, as a jury awarded Reynolds $175,001 in damages. In 1962, he lost his contract with King Features Syndicate, owned by Hearst, after he criticized Hearst executives. His late writing appeared sporadically in various publications.

In 1965, referring to Robert F. Kennedy, Pegler wrote: "Some white patriot of the Southern tier will spatter his spoonful of brains in public premises before the snow flies." Kennedy was assassinated three years later, though by a Palestinian Arab.

== Personal life and death ==
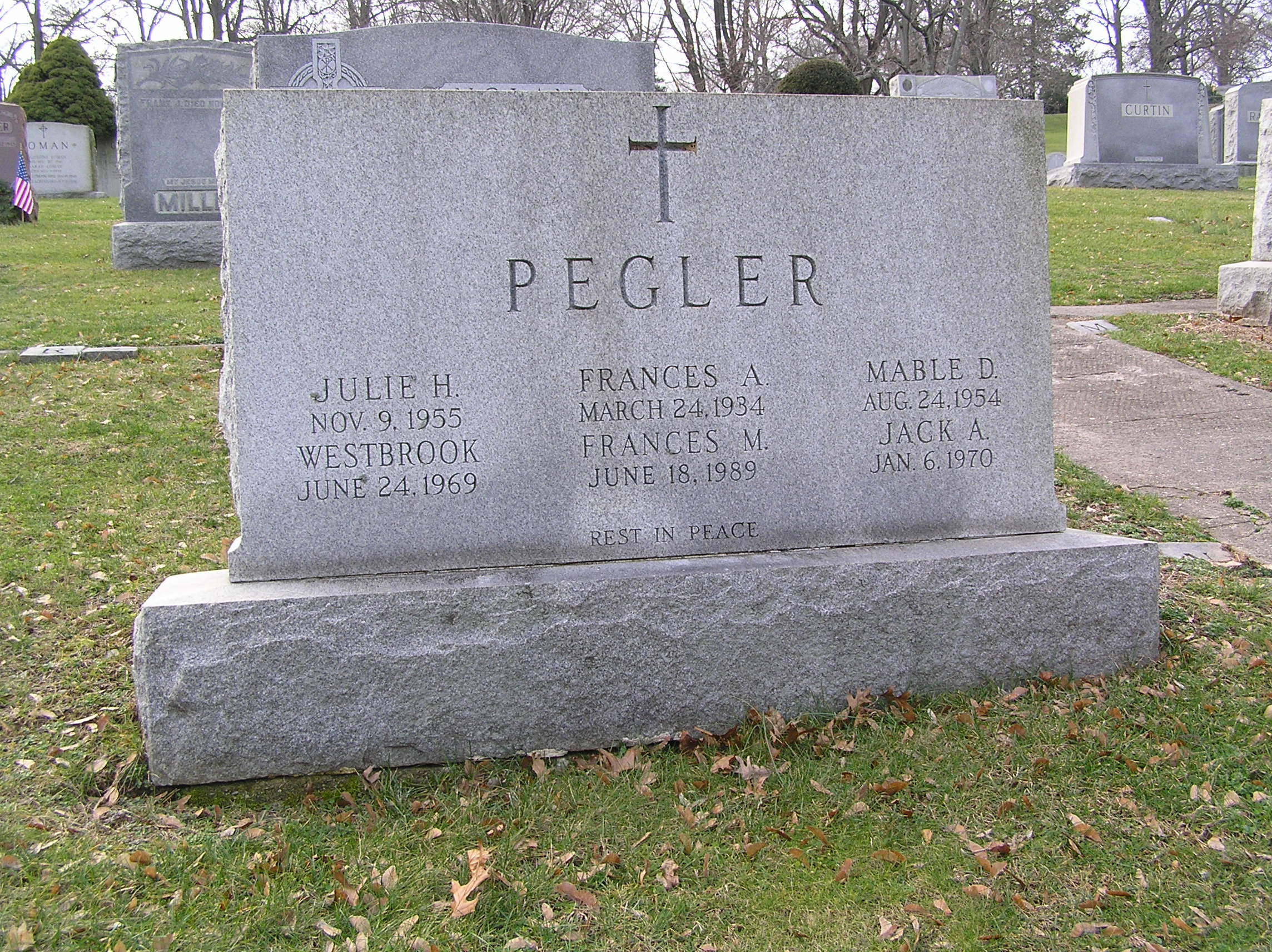
Headstone of Westbrook Pegler in Gate of Heaven Cemetery, Hawthorne, New York.

On August 28, 1922, Pegler, a Roman Catholic, married Julia Harpman, a onetime New York Daily News crime reporter, who was from a Jewish family in Tennessee. She died on November 8, 1955. In 1961, he married his secretary Maude Wettje.

Pegler died age 74 on June 24, 1969, in Tucson, Arizona of stomach cancer. He is interred in the Cemetery of the Gate of Heaven in Hawthorne, New York.

== Awards ==
- 1941: Pulitzer Prize for coverage of labor racketeers

== Legacy ==
=== Parodies ===
Pegler's distinctive writing style was often the subject of parody. In 1949, Wolcott Gibbs of The New Yorker imagined a Peglerian tirade to a little girl asking whether there was a Santa Claus (parodying the famous "Yes, Virginia, there is a Santa Claus" letter). In the Gibbs/Pegler version, "Santa Claus" was actually Sammy Klein of Red Hook, Brooklyn, and had raped a six-year-old as a deliberate strategy to avoid being drafted into World War I. After joining the Communist Party, he adopted his alias and began his Christmas racket by hijacking trucks with toy shipments. Gibbs' parody opens:

You're damn right there is a Santa Claus, Virginia. He lives down the road a piece from me, and my name for him is Comrade Jelly Belly, after a poem composed about him once by an admiring fellow-traveller now happily under the sod.

Mad Magazine ran a Pegler parody in its February 1957 issue (#31), using the actual title of Pegler's own column from 1944 on, "As Pegler Sees It". Starting with a report on a little kid stealing a bike, it devolved into a long tirade against, among other targets, Roosevelt, Truman, the Falange, organized labor, municipal corruption and Abeline's Boy Scout Troop 18 (AKA the Abraham Lincoln Brigade). Every third sentence or so ended with some variation on “And you know what I think of Eleanor Roosevelt”. The mock column concluded with:

... which brought together such Commie-loving cronies as you know what I think of Eleanor Roosevelt.
It stinks. The whole thing stinks. You stink.

Mad also parodied him as "Westbank Piglet" in one panel (p. 2) of its first comic book parody Superduperman (issue #4).

=== Quotes ===
Interest in Pegler was briefly revived when a line originally written by him appeared in Republican Vice-Presidential nominee Sarah Palin's acceptance speech at the 2008 Republican National Convention in St. Paul, Minnesota. "We grow good people in our small towns, with honesty and sincerity and dignity", she said, attributing it to "a writer." The speech was written by Matthew Scully, a senior speech writer for George W. Bush.

In a column about Palin's use of the quote, Wall Street Journal columnist Thomas Frank described Pegler as "the all-time champion of fake populism".

== Writings ==
Pegler's literary agent was George T. Bye, who was also Eleanor Roosevelt's agent.

Pegler published three volumes of his collected writings:

- T'ain't Right, 1936
- The Dissenting Opinions of Mister Westbrook Pegler, 1938
- George Spelvin, American and Fireside Chats, 1942

== See also ==
- Will H. Kindig, Los Angeles City Council member condemned by Pegler
