= George T. Bye =

American literary agent

- Born: October 21, 1887; Kansas City, Missouri
- Died: November 24, 1957 (aged 70); New Canaan, Connecticut
- Other names: George Thurman Bindbeutel
- Occupation: Literary agent
- Known for: representing Frank Buck and Eleanor Roosevelt

George Thurman Bye (né George Thurman Bindbeutel, October 21, 1887 - November 24, 1957) was the literary agent of Frank Buck and Eleanor Roosevelt. A prominent figure in the literary world before World War II, Bye rose to fame as the agent of people in the news and amateur authors with something timely or sensational to say, so called "stunt books".

== Early life and career ==
Bye was educated in public schools. He went to work as a reporter on The Kansas City Star, later becoming the paper's drama critic. In 1912, he joined the staff of the Chicago Tribune. While in Chicago he edited the magazine Motor Age and promoted automobile races. In 1916, after a brief period in government service in Washington, D.C., Bye went to London as correspondent for The Kansas City Star and other papers. He was a reporter for the Stars and Stripes during World War I. Returning to the United States in 1921, Bye joined the New York World. In 1922 he accompanied Walter Hinton and Euclides Pinto Martins, aviators, on a "friendship flight" to Rio de Janeiro, published in newspapers at the time in the USA and Brazil and which became known as "Raid New York-Rio". Their plane (nicknamed "Sampaio Correa I") was wrecked in Cuba, but they found another plane (nicknamed "Sampaio Correa II") at Pensacola, Florida, and reached the Brazilian capital on February 8, 1923, six months after their departure. On his return to New York, Bye set up his literary agency at 535 Fifth Avenue.

== Agent ==
Clients of George T. Bye (upper right) included: Eleanor Roosevelt (lower right), Deems Taylor (upper left), and Westbrook Pegler (lower left), shown here at the home of Lowell Thomas at Quaker Lake, Pawling, New York (1938)

Bye's writers included Frank Buck, Eleanor Roosevelt, Charles A. Lindbergh, Alexander Woollcott, Rebecca West, Westbrook Pegler, John Erskine, Rose Wilder Lane, Laura Ingalls Wilder, Richard and Frances Lockridge (who wrote the Mr. and Mrs. North mystery novels), Alfred E. Smith, Franklin P. Adams, Frederick Hazlitt Brennan, Wilbur Daniel Steele, Heywood Broun, Deems Taylor, Donald C. Peattie and General of the Armies John J. Pershing.

Bye liked to describe himself as "guide, philosopher and wet nurse." On one occasion, he commented: "We arrange marriages and divorces for them and rush obstetricians to their doorsteps when they're having babies. The only time I ever failed was when a client came to me with a valuable dog who refused to have pups. I couldn't do a thing."

Bye had a particular fondness for newspaper reporters, having been one himself. "The newspaper lads are all old cronies," he once remarked. He was also close to President Franklin D. Roosevelt and encouraged Eleanor Roosevelt to write a syndicated column, My Day.

Bye ranked the Abbe children among his most amusing clients. Patience Abbe, 12 years old; Richard, 10, and Johnny, 8, were the children of Jim Abbe, an itinerant photographer, and his wife, the former Polly Platt, once a Ziegfeld girl. Prodded by their mother, the children dictated their memoirs, which Bye sold as Around the World in Eleven Years. According to the Abbe family, Patience Abbe was the primary author. The book was a surprise hit.

In 1954, Bye arranged the sale to Hollywood of Lindbergh's best-selling autobiography, The Spirit of St. Louis, for more than $1,000,000. But Bye was initially unenthusiastic about Laura Ingalls Wilder, commenting that the manuscript of her unpublished memoir, Pioneer Girl, lacked drama. Wilder's daughter, Rose Wilder Lane, herself a client of Bye's, ultimately convinced him to take on her mother's series of children's novels, drawn from the earlier memoir, which ultimately became some of the agency's most profitable titles.

Another agency, James Brown Associates, took over George T. Bye & Co in 1949.

Bye died in 1957.
