= Amy Jo Hutchison =

American economic justice advocate

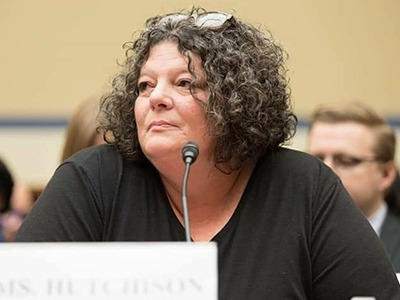
- Born: Wheeling, West Virginia, U.S.
- Occupation: Organizer
- Known for: Economic justice advocacy

Amy Jo Hutchison is an American economic justice advocate who campaigns against poverty and hunger in West Virginia.

== Career ==
In 2017, Hutchison began working as an organizer for Our Future West Virginia. Hutchison organizes across the state of West Virginia, which includes meetings with members of the community and organizing lobbying campaigns at the state capitol.

In December 2017, she visited the United States Congress as part of a lobbying campaign organized by First Focus, a bipartisan children's advocacy organization, to advocate for a reauthorization of the C.H.I.P. health insurance program.

In 2018, Hutchison was one of the leaders of the Poor People's Campaign in West Virginia, during a national effort to conduct forty days of demonstrations and other action to support economic justice.

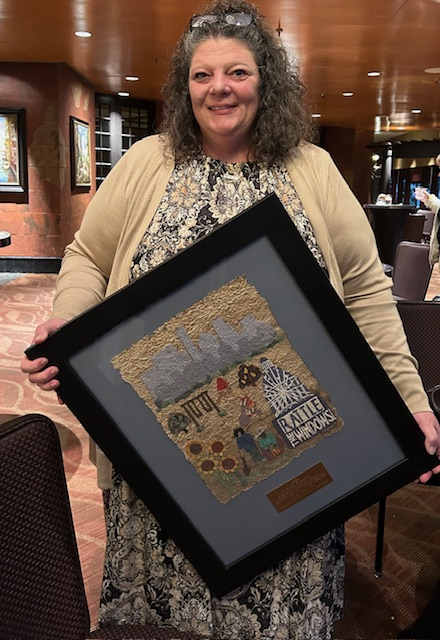
Hutchison receiving the T. Berry Brazelton Friend of Children Award.

On February 5, 2020, as part of the Healthy Kids and Families Coalition in West Virginia, Hutchison testified before the United States Congress in opposition to a Trump administration proposal to change the formula for calculating the poverty rate, using real-life examples. Her testimony included "nights she went to bed hungry, nights she had to nurse her gallbladder with essential oils and eat ibuprofen "like Tic-Tacs" because she didn't have health insurance."

Hutchison then focused on the Census, because West Virginia is the most reliant on the related funding. In March 2020, Hutchison explained how and why Our Future West Virginia was supporting the U.S. Census to the Times West Virginian.

In February 2021, at a Poor People's Campaign rally, she said, "If we are going to be a society that insists we have to pull ourselves up by our bootstraps, then we can’t refuse to give people the bootstraps they need to pull themselves up." She was speaking in support of a gradual increase of the minimum wage to $15 an hour and in response to opposition from Democratic Sen. Joe Manchin of West Virginia. She also co-wrote an opinion article in February 2021 with Indivar Dutta-Gupta, the Co-Executive Director of the Georgetown Center on Poverty & Inequality, advocating for Congress to "go big" on COVID relief.

On October 28, 2021, Hutchison appeared on The Problem with Jon Stewart, and discussed topics relevant to working-class people, including infrastructure and child care.

On March 8, 2024, Hutchison received the T. Berry Brazelton Friend of Children Award from the Southern Early Childhood Association.

== Personal life ==
Hutchison has two daughters. She has described herself as "working poor," because she earns too much to qualify for government assistance but "it’s a struggle to make it check to check."
