= Walter Johnson (academic) =

American historian

Walter Johnson (June 27, 1915 – June 14, 1985) was a political historian of the United States who believed that given political developments in post-Second World War America, there should be no strict separation between academics and politics. He was a political progressive who believed his generation had a special responsibility to democracy.

== Education ==
Johnson began his education at Dartmouth College where he took a B.A. in 1937. He then undertook graduate work at the University of Chicago where he earned an M.A. in 1938 and his Ph.D. in history in 1941.

== Academic career ==
Johnson's first academic post was that of instructor of history at the University of Chicago between 1940 and 1943. He then assumed the post of assistant professor at the same university (1943–49) then associate professor (1949–50) and professor of history (1950–66). From 1963 to 1966, Johnson held an endowned chair: the Preston and Sterling Morton Professor of History. From 1950 to 1961, he also served as the chair of the university's history department. As chair of the history department, Johnson assisted in bringing important figures to the university. These included Hannah Gray who served as president of the university, and prominent historian John Hope Franklin. One of Johnson's graduate students, who went on to become a prominent historian of the United States, was Athan Theoharis.

Johnson was the Harold Vyvyan Harmsworth Professor of American History at Oxford University during the 1957–58 academic year. During 1966–1982, he was a professor of history at the University of Hawaii, Honolulu. During 1982–1985, he was a visiting professor of history at Grand Valley State College in Allendale, Michigan.

== Political career ==
Johnson's involvement in politics began in 1940 when, on his own, he made stump speeches for President Franklin D. Roosevelt. In 1943, because he was unable to serve in the military as a result of a failed physical exam, Johnson ran unsuccessfully for an alderman seat in Chicago, while suspecting the Chicago political machine and its money had resulted in his defeat. Johnson then worked on an Illinois senatorial campaign and in the effort to draft Adlai Stevenson as a presidential candidate in 1952. He also befriended John F. Kennedy and, whilst not credited, assisted Kennedy in the preparation of his Pulitzer prize winning book Profiles in Courage.

== Published works ==
- The Battle Against Isolation, University of Chicago Press, 1944. reprint. Da Capo Press. 1973. ISBN 978-0-306-70480-2.
- William Allen White's America, Holt, 1947.
- (Editor) Selected Letters of William Allen White, Holt, 1947. (reprint Greenwood Press, 1968)
- (Editor) Roosevelt and the Russians, Doubleday, 1949.
- How We Drafted Adlai Stevenson, Knopf, 1955.
- 1600 Pennsylvania Avenue: Presidents and the People, 1929-59, Little, Brown, 1960.
- (With Francis J. Colligan) The Fulbright Program: A History, University of Chicago Press, 1965.
- The United States Since 1865, Ginn (Boston), 1965.
- (Editor) The Papers of Adlai Stevenson, eight volumes, Little, Brown, 1972–79.
