= Patience Abbe =

American writer (1924–2012)

- Born: Patience Shorrock Abbe; July 22, 1924; Paris, France
- Died: March 17, 2012 (aged 87); Redding, California, US
- Occupation: Writer
- Spouses: Brendan O'Mahoney (m. 1949; div. 1954) Francois Leydet (divorced)
- Children: 2
- Father: James Abbe

Patience Shorrock Abbe (July 22, 1924 – March 17, 2012) was a best-selling author as a tween and teen.

== Early life ==
The daughter of James Abbe, a photographer, and Polly Shorrock, a Ziegfeld girl, Patience Abbe was born in Paris to globetrotting parents.

Instigated by her mother, she and her two younger brothers, Richard and John, wrote a best-selling book, Around the World in Eleven Years (1936) when Patience was 12. It was followed by Of All Places! (1937) and No Place Like Home (1940). In later years the family and Herschel Brickell, literary editor of The New York Post, said that Patience had authored the books.

George T. Bye, the literary agent of Frank Buck and Eleanor Roosevelt, represented Patience and her brothers.

The fame of the books led the family to Hollywood, where the Abbes became part of Hollywood society.

Patience gave up writing books in her teens, and the family's fame declined. A family anecdote, which Patience liked to recount, describes her 21st birthday party, where she met by chance a neighbor, Bette Davis. "Patience Abbe!" Davis exclaimed. "I always wondered what happened to you!"

However, in 2012, Patience's niece Abbe Moyer reported that Patience had just finished an autobiography, I, Patience, which the family hopes to publish.

== Personal life ==
Patience's first husband was Brendan O'Mahoney, with whom she had two daughters, Catherine and Shelley, before the marriage ended in divorce in 1954. She later married Francois Leydet, an author, whose books included the Sierra Club books "The Last Redwoods" and, with David Brower, "Time and the River Flowing." Patience helped to edit those Sierra Club Books. That marriage also ended in divorce.

== Later years ==
For the last half century of her life, she lived in Marin and Shasta Counties, California, where she worked as a church secretary and as an assistant to authors. She was a sculptor and an active conservationist.

Her brother Richard W. Abbe, a California appellate court judge, died in 2000. Her brother John died in 2022 in La Jolla, California.
