= Jeanne Theoharis =

American political scientist

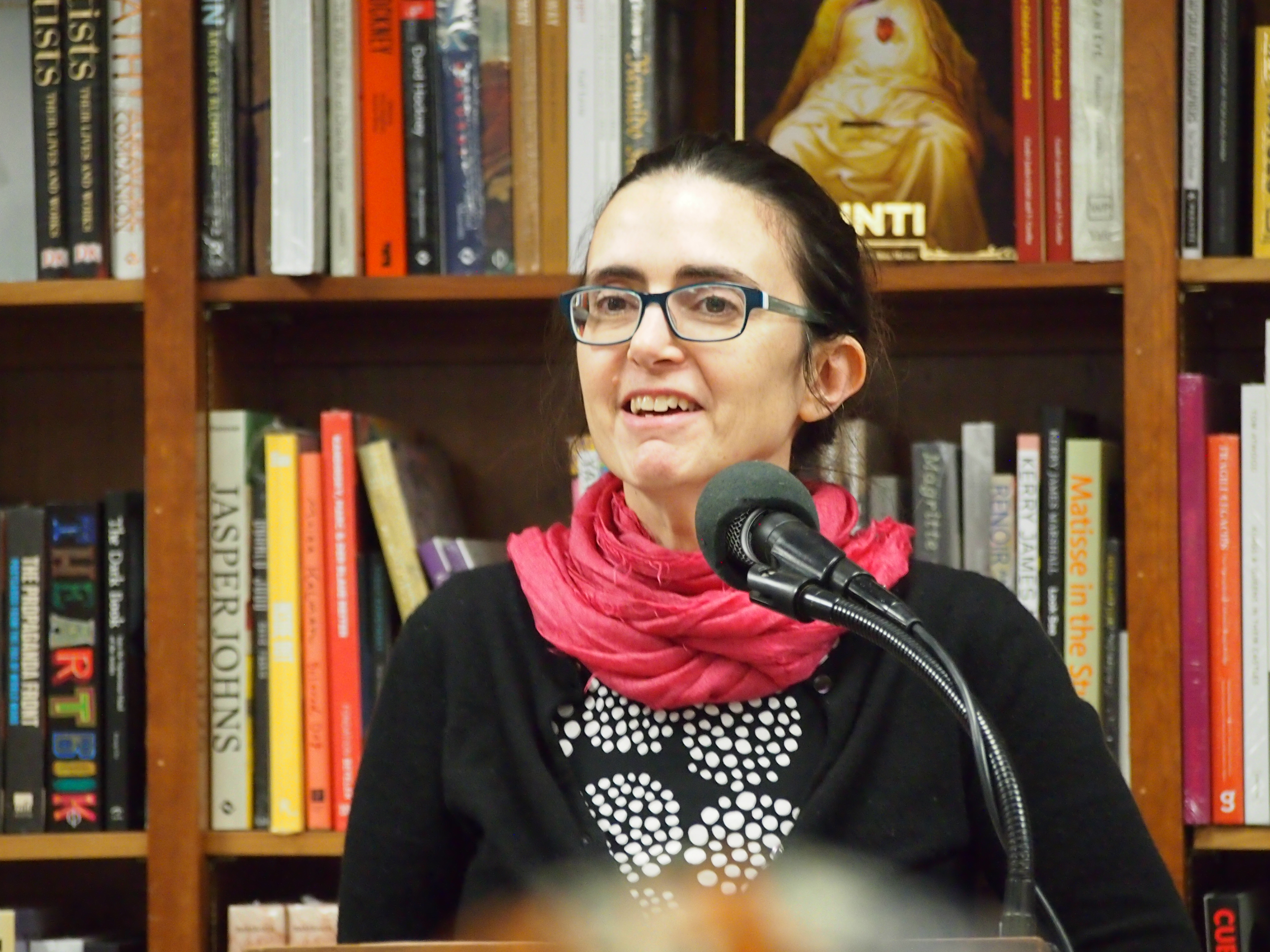
- Education: Harvard University, University of Michigan
- Occupations: Professor of Political Science and History
- Parent: Athan Theoharis (father)
- Relatives: Liz Theoharis (sister)
- Writing career
- Genre: non-fiction
- Notable awards: NAACP Image Award, Peabody Award

Jeanne Theoharis is a Distinguished Professor of Political Science at Brooklyn College of the City University of New York (CUNY). She is also a Distinguished Professor of History at the CUNY Graduate Center.

== Early life ==
Jeanne Theoharis was born to activist Nancy Artinian and professor Athan Theoharis. She was raised in Fox Point, Wisconsin a village in Milwaukee County, Wisconsin near the campus of Marquette University where her father taught. She has two siblings Liz Theoharis co-chair of the Poor People's Campaign, and George Theoharis a professor of education, at Syracuse University.

== Career ==
Jeanne Theoharis graduated from Harvard College in 1991 with dual concentrations in Afro-American, and Women's Studies. She then went on to pursue a PhD, at the University of Michigan in American Culture. Theoharis is Distinguished Professor of Political Science at Brooklyn College at the City University of New York (CUNY). In her work as a political science professor she specializes in contemporary politics of race and gender, social policy, urban studies and 20th century African American history.

Theoharis is also the author of numerous books and articles on the Black freedom struggle, including the NAACP Image award-winning The Rebellious Life of Mrs. Rosa Parks and A More Beautiful and Terrible History, which won the 2018 Brooklyn Public Library Prize in Nonfiction. Theoharis' book The Rebellious Life of Mrs. Rosa Parks was adapted into an award-winning documentary directed by Johanna Hamilton and Yoruba Richen and executive produced by Soledad O'Brien for NBC-Peacock, where she served as a consulting producer. The documentary won a Peabody Award and a Television Academy Honor Award.

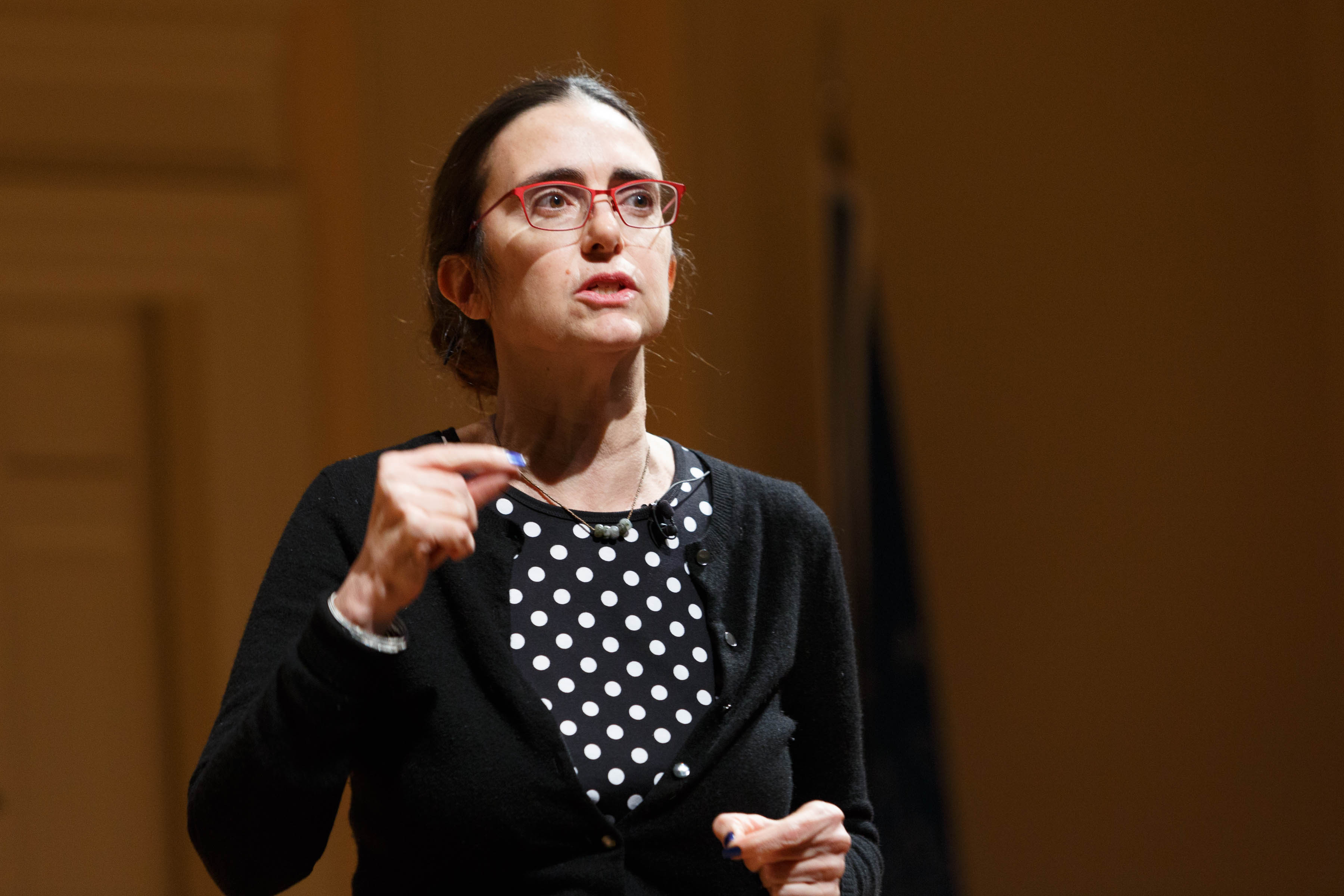
Theoharis speaks in 2020

In 2013, Theoharis co-created, a roundtable discussion program entitled Conversations in Black Freedom Studies at the Schomburg Center for Research in Black Culture with Sarah Lawrence professor Komozi Woodard, and Lehman College professor Robyn C. Spencer-Antoine. The series features a roundtable of scholars and writers on the first Thursday of each month speaking on a topic in Black history, usually centered around a new book(s) in the field.

Theoharis has also worked as a faculty coleader in the Narrating Change, Changing Narratives research group of the 2014-2016 Seminar on Public Engagement and Collaborative Research.

== Works ==
Essays

- Marchevsky, Alejandra, and Jeanne Theoharis, 2006. Not working: Latina immigrants, low-wage jobs, and the failure of welfare reform. NYU Press.
- The Rebellious Life of Mrs. Rosa Parks. Beacon Press. January 29, 2013. ISBN 978-0-8070-5048-4.
- Theoharis, Jeanne, Burgin, Say, 2015. "Rosa Parks wasn't Meek, Passive or Naive--and 7 Other Things You Probably Didn't Learn in School", The Nation, December 1.
- Marchevsky, Alejandra, Theoharis, Jeanne, 2016. "Why It Matters That Hillary Clinton Championed Welfare Reform", The Nation, March 1.
- Theoharis, Jeanne, 2016. "MLK Would never shut down a freeway and 6 other myths about the civil rights movement and Black Lives Matter", The Root, July 15.
- Coauthored: "Charlottesville belies racism’s deep roots in the North".

Books

- Noel S. Anderson; Jeanne Theoharis; Gaston Alonso; Celina Su (May 1, 2009). Our Schools Suck: Students Talk Back to a Segregated Nation on the Failures of Urban Education. NYU Press. pp. 69–. ISBN 978-0-8147-8320-7.
- Theoharis, J. (2013). The rebellious life of Mrs. Rosa Parks. Beacon Press.
- Theoharis, J. (2018). A More Beautiful and Terrible History: The Uses and Misuses of Civil Rights History. Beacon Press. ISBN 978-0-8070-7587-6.
- Brian Purnell; Jeanne Theoharis; with Komozi Woodard (2019). The Strange Careers of the Jim Crow North: Segregation and Struggle outside of the South. NYU Press. ISBN 9781479820337.
- Theoharis, J. (2025). King of the North: Martin Luther King Jr.’s Life of Struggle Outside the South. The New Press.

Editor

- Jeanne F. Theoharis, Komozi Woodard, eds. Freedom North: Black Freedom Struggles Outside the South, 1940-1980, Palgrave Macmillan, 2003, ISBN 9780312294687
- Jeanne Theoharis; Komozi Woodard, eds. (January 1, 2005). Groundwork: Local Black Freedom Movements in America. NYU Press. ISBN 978-0-8147-8285-9.
- Jeanne Theoharis; Komozi Woodard, eds. (November 1, 2009). Want to Start a Revolution?: Radical Women in the Black Freedom Struggle. NYU Press. ISBN 978-0-8147-3230-4.

== Awards and honors ==
- 2013 Letitia Woods Brown Award from the Association of Black Women Historians, The Rebellious Life of Mrs. Rosa Parks
- 2014 NAACP Image Award, The Rebellious Life of Mrs. Rosa Parks
- 2018 Brooklyn Public Library Literary Award for Nonfiction, A More Beautiful and Terrible History; The Uses and Misuses of Civil Rights History
- 2022 Peabody Award, The Rebellious Life of Mrs. Rosa Parks (documentary)
- 2023: Television Academy Honors, The Rebellious Life of Mrs. Rosa Parks (documentary)
