= Athan Theoharis =

American historian (1936–2021)

- Born: Athan George Theoharis; 3 August 1936; Milwaukee, Wisconsin, U.S.
- Died: 3 July 2021 (aged 84); Syracuse, New York, U.S.
- Education: University of Chicago
- Occupation: Professor of history
- Employer: Marquette University
- Known for: The Boss: J. Edgar Hoover and the Great American Inquisition (1988), From the Secret Files of J. Edgar Hoover (1992)
- Spouse: Nancy Artinian
- Children: Jeanne Theoharis, Liz Theoharis, George Theoharis
- Parent(s): George Theoharis, Adeline Konop

Athan George Theoharis (August 3, 1936 – July 3, 2021) was an American historian, professor of history at Marquette University in Milwaukee, Wisconsin. As well as his extensive teaching career, he was noteworthy as an expert on the Federal Bureau of Investigation (FBI), J. Edgar Hoover, and U.S. intelligence agencies, having written and edited many books on these and related subjects.

== Background ==
Born in Milwaukee on August 3, 1936, to Greek immigrants George Theoharis and Adeline Konop, Theoharis earned all of his degrees from the University of Chicago: two bachelor's degrees in political science in 1956 and 1957, a master's degree in 1958, and his Ph.D. in history in 1965.

== Career ==
Theoharis taught at Texas A&M University, Wayne State University, City University of New York, State University of New York at Buffalo, and at Marquette University.

The scope of his writings has extended to Cold War history, anti-communism in America, civil rights and the politics of government secrecy.

== Grants and awards ==
Theoharis's grants and awards include:

- 1965, 1966: Grant from the Truman Institute for National and International Affairs
- 1971: Grant from the Institute for Humane Studies
- 1976: American Bar Association Gavel Award
- 1976: National Endowment for the Humanities summer fellowship
- 1979: Binkley-Stephenson Award
- 1980: Grant from the Field Foundation
- 1980: Albert Beveridge research grant
- 2002: Lawrence G. Haggerty Award for Research Excellence
- 2003: Wisconsin Academy of Arts, Science and Literature, fellow
- 2006: American Civil Liberties Union of Wisconsin's Eunice Z. Edgar Lifetime Achievement Award

== Personal life and death ==
Theoharis married Nancy Artinian. They had three children: Jeanne Theoharis, Liz Theoharis, and George Theoharis.

Athan George Theoharis died age 84 on July 3, 2021 in Syracuse, New York, from pneumonia.

== Legacy ==
At the time of his death, the Milwaukee Sentinel Journal called him a "persistent scourge of the FBI" due to its violations of American civil liberties.

Theoharis was an early pioneer in the use of Freedom of Information Act (FOIA) requests and wrote a guidebook on FOIAs for scholars.

== Work ==
Theoharis's first book was Anatomy of Anti-Communism (1969), which was quickly followed with the publication of his revised PhD dissertation, directed under the supervision of Walter Johnson, titled The Yalta Myths: An Issue in U.S. Politics, 1945–1955 (1970). The book explored the changing symbolism of the Yalta Conference and how it affected the domestic politics of both the Republican and Democratic Parties.

This was followed by his influential Seeds of Repression: Harry S. Truman and the Origins of McCarthyism (1971), and his influential article "Roosevelt and Truman on Yalta: The Origins of the Cold War" in Political Science Quarterly (1972). The former located the origins of so-called McCarthyism not with the junior senator from Wisconsin but with the context of the Cold War and President Harry Truman's flawed leadership and anti-Communist rhetoric which created a climate permitting the advent of the phenomenon of McCarthyism. The article highlighted Truman's role in determining, in part, the way in which the Cold War materialized.

In 1975, because of his work exploring the Truman and Eisenhower loyalty and security programs as well as his articles on FBI wiretapping, Theoharis was asked by the Church Committee to conduct research at presidential libraries. The Church Committee - the Senate select committee to study governmental operations with respect to intelligence activities - was formed by Senator Frank Church after Nixon administration, FBI, and CIA abuses became public. First without and then with qualified security clearances, Theoharis examined some presidential records relating to the FBI and White House at the Eisenhower, Kennedy, and Johnson presidential libraries. He also examined some FBI records for the Church Committee at FBI headquarters.

Following this work, and changes made to the Freedom of Information Act in the 1970s, in 1976 Theoharis became a specialist in the history of the FBI. He focused on FBI records procedures, rather than individual FBI targets, leading to discoveries or further understandings of the complexities and uses of FBI office files (as opposed to "official" FBI files), the JUNE mail file, the National Security Electronic Surveillance Index Card File, Surreptitious Entries file, COMPIC file, and COMRAP file.

His work has led some of his graduate students also to embark on FBI research. Two of his former PhD students include Kenneth O'Reilly (FBI and HUAC) and Christopher Gerard (FBI and the Senate Internal Security Subcommittee). Several of his master's students also studied the FBI with him while taking PhDs elsewhere: David Williams (PhD, University of New Hampshire) studied the early history of the FBI; Francis MacDonnell (PhD, Harvard University) studied the FBI and the Fifth Column; Douglas M. Charles (PhD, University of Edinburgh) studied the FBI and the anti-interventionist movement of 1939–45, and the FBI's Obscene File. Charles R. Gallagher, S.J. (Boston College) credits Theoharis with inspiring an integration of FBI and intelligence sources into the study of Vatican diplomatic relations.

Books

- Theoharis, Athan (1969). Anatomy of Anti-Communism. Hill and Wang.
- Theoharis, Athan (1970). The Yalta Myths: An Issue in U.S. Politics. University of Missouri Press. ISBN 0-8262-0088-5.
- Theoharis, Athan (1971). Seeds of Repression : Harry S. Truman and the origins of McCarthyism. Quadrangle Books. ISBN 9780812901696.
- Theoharis, Athan; Griffith, Robert, eds. (1974). The Specter: Original Essays on the Cold War and the Origins of McCarthyism. New Viewpoints. ISBN 0-531-06493-X.
- Theoharis, Athan (1978). Spying on Americans: Political Surveillance from Hoover to the Huston Plan. Temple University Press. ISBN 0-87722-141-3.
- Theoharis, Athan, ed. (1979). The Truman Presidency: The Origins of the Imperial Presidency and the National Security State. E.M. Coleman Enterprises. ISBN 0-930576-12-8.
- Theoharis, Athan & Dubofsky, Melvyn (1982). Imperial Democracy: The United States since 1945. Prentice Hall. ISBN 0-13-451766-0.
- Theoharis, Athan, ed. (1982). Beyond the Hiss Case: The FBI, Congress, and the Cold War. Temple University Press. ISBN 0-87722-241-X.
- Theoharis, Athan & Cox, John Stuart (1988). The Boss: J. Edgar Hoover and the Great American Inquisition. Temple University Press. ISBN 0-87722-532-X.
- Theoharis, Athan, ed. (1992). From the Secret Files of J. Edgar Hoover. Ivan R. Dee, Publisher. ISBN 1-56663-017-7.
- Theoharis, Athan, ed. (1994). The FBI: An Annotated Bibliography and Research Guide. Garland Science. ISBN 0-8153-0871-X.
- Theoharis, Athan (1995). J. Edgar Hoover, Sex, and Crime: An Historical Antidote. Ivan R. Dee, Publisher. ISBN 1-56663-071-1.
- Theoharis, Athan, ed. (1998). A Culture of Secrecy: The Government versus the People's Right to Know. University Press of Kansas. ISBN 0-7006-0998-9.
- Theoharis, Athan, ed. (1999). The FBI: A Comprehensive Reference Guide. Checkmark Books. ISBN 0-8160-4228-4.
- Theoharis, Athan (2002). Chasing Spies: How the FBI Failed in Counterintelligence but Promoted the Politics of McCarthyism in the Cold War Years. Diane Publishing Co. ISBN 0-7567-8730-0.
- Theoharis, Athan & Theoharis, Jeanne (2002). These Yet to Be United States: Civil Rights and Civil Liberties in America Since 1945. Wadsworth Publishing. ISBN 0-15-506989-6.
- Theoharis, Athan (2004). The FBI & American Democracy: A Brief Critical History. University Press of Kansas. ISBN 0-7006-1345-5.
- Edited by Theoharis, Athan; Immerman, Richard & Olmsted, Kathryn (2005). The Central Intelligence Agency: Security under Scrutiny. Greenwood Press. ISBN 0-313-33282-7.
- Theoharis, Athan (2007). The Quest for Absolute Security: The Failed Relations Among U.S. Intelligence Agencies. Ivan R. Dee. ISBN 978-1-56663-697-1.
- Theoharis, Athan (2011). Abuse of Power: How Cold War Surveillance and Secrecy Policy Shaped the Response to 9/11. Temple University Press. ISBN 978-1-4399-0665-1.
- Theoharis, Athan (December 16, 2011). Expanded Powers: The FBI, the NSA, and the Struggle Between National Security and Civil Liberties in the Wake of 9/11. Now and Then Reader LLC. ISBN 9781937853068.
