= The Problem with Jon Stewart =

American current affairs television series

- Genre: Social commentary; Current affairs; Talk show
- Created by: Jon Stewart
- Written by: Kris Acimovic (head writer)
- Presented by: Jon Stewart
- Theme music composer: Gary Clark Jr.
- Country of origin: United States
- Original language: English
- No. of seasons: 2
- No. of episodes: 20

Production
- Executive producers: Jon Stewart; Brinda Adhikari; James Dixon; Richard Plepler
- Running time: 60 minutes
- Production companies: Busboy Productions; EDEN Productions; Smoking Baby Productions

Original release
- Network: Apple TV+
- Release: September 30, 2021 – April 6, 2023

Related
- The Daily Show

The Problem with Jon Stewart is an American current affairs television series hosted by Jon Stewart on Apple TV+. Each episode focuses on a single issue. The series premiered on September 30, 2021. The second season premiered on October 7, 2022. The series was canceled in October 2023 after two seasons.

== Production ==
In October 2020, as part of a multi-year production deal with Apple, it was announced that Jon Stewart was creating a new current affairs series for Apple TV+, marking his return to the format since leaving The Daily Show in 2015.

Throughout early 2021, the show was building out its production team, hiring Brinda Adhikari to serve as showrunner and executive producer, Chelsea Devantez as head writer, and Lorrie Baranek as Stewart's executive in production in February 2021. Adhikari was a longtime network news veteran before coming on to the show. Around the same time, Busboy Productions posted job listings seeking to fill positions for all aspects of the production.

On April 7, 2021, the title of The Problem with Jon Stewart and a late 2021 premiere date for the series were announced.

Each episode lasted one hour and focused on a single issue that was "currently part of the national conversation and [Stewart's] advocacy work". Apple had said that the show would run for multiple seasons, and that each season would be accompanied by a companion podcast, co-hosted by Stewart and his writing and production staff and following up on each episode.

The series began filming in front of a live studio audience in New York City on July 14, 2021.

== Cancellation ==
On October 19, 2023, it was announced that the show was cancelled due to creative differences between Stewart and Apple, which reportedly involved the show's coverage of artificial intelligence, Israel, and China. On The Daily Show on April 8, 2024, in an interview with FTC Chair Lina Khan, Stewart discussed some of his problems with Apple, and said that when he wanted to have Khan on the show, "Apple asked us not do it ... They literally said 'please don’t talk to her'." Stewart also said that Apple wouldn't let him talk about AI on the same episode. CNN reported that Stewart had talked about concerns expressed by Apple over his show covering subjects of AI, China, and Israel.

== Episodes ==
=== Series overview ===
Season	Episodes	Originally released	
Season	Episodes	First released	Last released
1	8	September 30, 2021	March 24, 2022
2	12	October 6, 2022	April 6, 2023

=== Season 1 (2021–22) ===
No. overall	No. in season	Title	Original release date	Prod. code
1	1	"Veterans"	September 30, 2021	101
Jon Stewart addresses American war veterans' health issues, specifically from burn pits. He speaks to some veterans who say that the Veterans Health Administration doesn't completely cover their treatment if the standard of proof for causality isn't met. Secretary of Veterans Affairs Denis McDonough sits down for an interview. This episode concludes with a cameo by Ken Burns.
2	2	"COVID-19 Restrictions"	October 14, 2021	102
Jon Stewart sits down with Bassem Youssef, Francisco Marquez Lara, and Maria Ressa for a discussion on the inconsistency and vagueness in American discussions of "freedom". The panelists contrast their repression as journalists and activists in Egypt, Venezuela, and the Philippines with perceived abridgments of freedom in America. Ressa argues that the Philippines, where she claims per capita activity on American-run social media platforms is the highest globally, is a bellwether of the destructive influence of algorithmically tailored misinformation on democracies.
3	3	"Working-Class Economy"	October 28, 2021	103
Jon talks about how the US government frequently bails out corporations and the rich, but any talk of government assistance to the non-wealthy is dismissed as "socialism". He says that Tim Geithner told him that the government shouldn't pay the mortgages of people who had defaulted during the 2007–2010 subprime mortgage crisis because of "moral hazard." Secretary of Treasury Janet Yellen sits down for an interview. Panel: Douglas Holtz-Eakin (former director of the Congressional Budget Office). Darrick Hamilton (professor at the New School). Amy Jo Hutchison. Magaly Licolli. Guest(s): LeVar Burton, Jason Alexander, and Adam Pally star in a mock movie trailer satirizing Elon Musk, Jeff Bezos and Richard Branson's ventures in space tourism.
4	4	"Gun Control"	November 11, 2021	104
Jon focuses on the link between domestic violence and gun violence. He interviews two women, April Ross and Janet Paulsen, whose husbands sought to kill them for wanting to leave abusive marriages. Jon interviews David Chipman and a member of the International Association of Chiefs of Police (IACP). Guests: Niecy Nash and Thandiwe Newton.
5	5	"Stock Market"	March 3, 2022	105
Jon discusses the stock market, juxtaposing its ownership inequality with its supposed democratization. He explains that with Robinhood Markets, an investor's money doesn't go directly to the stockbroker; instead, the money goes to a payment for order flow (PFOF) handler such as Citadel LLC. Sometimes, market makers "slip the order into what are called dark pools" according to Stewart. He describes "dark pools" as "private exchanges." Steward expresses cynicism about PFOF because he credits Bernie Madoff with the idea. He next jokes regarding investors' money, "Bernie made off!" Later, he compares Robinhood Markets to FanDuel.: Guest: Gary Gensler (current Securities and Exchange Commission Chair).
6	6	"Climate Change"	March 10, 2022	106
Jon lampoons the media’s over-reliance on sensationalist tactics to convey urgency while still failing to provide meaningful, actionable solutions; covers the oil industry’s 20th-century propaganda campaign to individualize the collective responsibility for environmental stewardship, discusses how humans’ track record on similar issues suggests further inaction, shows montage with public statements about tackling climate change reaching back to George H. W. Bush. A short satirical video from actor-activist Ed Begley Jr. leads to the panel. Sunita Narain, PhD, Director General at the Center for Science and Environment, hosts an intermission piece about the material impacts of climate change on the global south, relevant broken political promises, and future needs. After a second convening of the panel, Jon interviews with Ben Van Beurden, CEO of Shell.: Guests: Katherine Dixon IEA Chief Counselor, former Shell VP of Strategy for Energy Transition, Jesse Jenkins, PhD, Professor of Energy Systems Engineering at Princeton University, Heather Toney, VP of Community Engagement at Environmental Defense Fund
7	7	"Media"	March 17, 2022	107
Jon Stewart discusses the United States cable news networks and their attempts to boost Nielsen ratings. Stewart also discusses Christopher Rufo receiving media attention for voicing his opposition to critical race theory (CRT).: Guest: Former Disney CEO Bob Iger.
8	8	"White People"	March 24, 2022	108
Stewart criticizes white politicians' responses to the George Floyd protests and says that black American intellectuals and artists, including Frederick Douglass, Angela Davis, and Sister Souljah have been articulating similar messages about systemic racism in America for centuries. In montages of news clips at which Stewart aims his criticisms, Bill O'Reilly cites Oprah Winfrey as an example of a successful woman "who made it on her own in America." Anthony Scaramucci says, "LeBron James is a great American success story." Bill O'Reilly blames poverty on the "collapse of the traditional family that is hurting the African American community." Bernard Goldberg says, "72% of black babies are born to single mothers." Stewart compares racial stereotypes in news coverage of drug crises and poverty. Stewart cites the GI education benefit as an example of racial discrimination against black Americans. He interviews Lisa Bond, who says, "All of us white people do this [engage in racism]." Bond goes on to claim, "Every single white person upholds the systems and structures of racism." Stewart travels to Washington DC to interview U.S. Senators Tim Scott (Room 104) and Cory Booker (Room 717) in the Hart Senate Office Building.: Guests: Andrew Sullivan, Lisa Bond, Charles “Chip” Gallagher.

=== Season 2 (2022–23) ===
No. overall	No. in season	Title	Original release date	Prod. code
9	1	"The War Over Gender"	October 6, 2022	201
Stewart explores the complex and contentious debates surrounding gender identity and rights in America. The episode examines the social and political tensions surrounding transgender issues and their impact on various communities.
10	2	"Where Is Our Tax Money Going?"	October 13, 2022	202
The show investigates how government funds are allocated and spent, critically examining the transparency and effectiveness of public spending. Stewart breaks down the complex mechanisms of federal budget allocation.
11	3	"Globalization: Made In America"	October 20, 2022	203
Stewart analyzes the global economic impact of American corporate practices, exploring how globalization has transformed international trade and labor markets. The episode delves into the complex interconnections of modern economic systems.
12	4	"Midterms: This Is What Democracy Looks Like?"	October 27, 2022	204
The episode critically examines the 2022 midterm elections, questioning the fundamental mechanisms of American democratic processes. Stewart explores voter participation, electoral challenges, and the state of democratic representation.
13	5	"Allies: Friends Without Benefits"	November 3, 2022	205
Stewart investigates international diplomatic relationships, exploring the complexities of global alliances and their practical implications. The episode examines how nations negotiate and maintain strategic partnerships.
14	6	"Election Wrap-Up Special"	November 10, 2022	206
A comprehensive analysis of the 2022 midterm election results, providing insights into political shifts and their potential long-term consequences for American governance.
15	7	"Chaos, Law, and Order"	March 2, 2023	207
The show explores the challenges within the American criminal justice system, examining issues of law enforcement, legal reform, and societal perceptions of crime and punishment.
16	8	"The Military Industrial Excess"	March 9, 2023	208
Stewart critically examines the relationship between military spending, defense contractors, and national security policies. The episode investigates the economic and political dynamics of military procurement.
17	9	"The Inflation Blame Game"	March 16, 2023	209
An in-depth exploration of economic inflation, its causes, and the political rhetoric surrounding economic challenges. Stewart breaks down complex economic concepts for broader understanding.
18	10	"America's Incarceration Epidemic"	March 23, 2023	210
The show investigates the systemic issues within the American prison system, exploring mass incarceration, its societal impacts, and potential reform strategies.
19	11	"Searching for Allies"	March 30, 2023	211
Stewart examines the complexities of international diplomatic relationships and the challenges of maintaining global partnerships in a rapidly changing geopolitical landscape.
20	12	"Trump Indicted"	April 6, 2023	212
The final episode of the season focuses on the legal proceedings surrounding former President Donald Trump, analyzing the political and legal implications of the indictment.

== Release ==
The Problem with Jon Stewart premiered its first episode on September 30, 2021, on Apple TV+, with one new episode initially scheduled to premiere every other Thursday. The series is accompanied by a weekly podcast that premiered on September 30, 2021.

== See also ==
- The Daily Show
