= James Abbe =

American photographer (1883–1973)

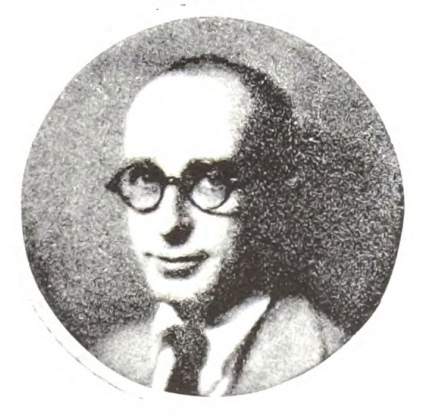
- Abbe c. 1923
- Born: James Edward Abbe; July 17, 1883; Alfred, Maine, U.S.
- Died: November 11, 1973 (aged 90); San Francisco, California, U.S.
- Known for: Photography
- Notable work: I Photograph Russia, 1934
- Spouses: Eloise Turner (m. 1905; died 1907) Phyllis Edward (m. 1909; div. 1922) Polly Platt (m. 1923; div. 1937) Irene Caby (m. 1939)
- Children: 8, including Patience Abbe

James Edward Abbe (July 17, 1883 – November 11, 1973) was an American photographer known for his celebrity portraits and photojournalism during the 1920s and 1930s.

Abbe photographed prominent figures of the era, including silent film stars and dancers. He sold his work to major publications including Vogue, Vanity Fair, and Berliner Illustrirte Zeitung.

In the late 1920s and 1930s, Abbe transitioned to photojournalism, documenting political upheaval in Europe. He photographed the Spanish Civil War and the rise of fascism in Germany, and gained international recognition for securing a rare portrait of Joseph Stalin in the Kremlin in 1932. His book I Photograph Russia was published in 1934.

== Early life ==
James Edward Abbe was born in 1883 in Alfred, Maine.

== Career ==
=== Early career and celebrity portraiture ===
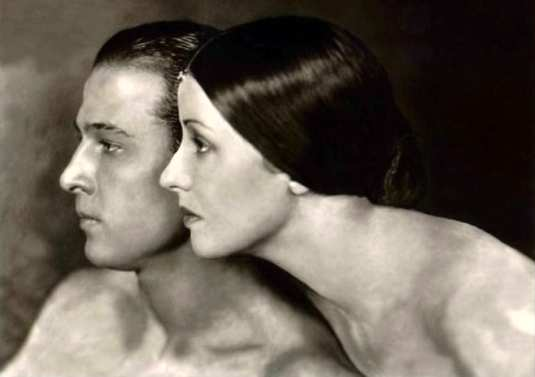
Abbe's portrait of Rudolph Valentino and Natasha Rambova, 1923

His career as an international photographer began with a commission from The Washington Post to photograph a 16-day voyage with the American battleship fleet to England and France in 1910. He made a name for himself photographing theatre stars of the New York stage and subsequently movie stars in New York, Hollywood, Paris, and London throughout the 1920s and 1930s. His unusual technique of working outside the studio set him apart from other photographers of the period. He sold his photographs to magazines, including Vogue and Vanity Fair, which brought his subjects greater fame.

Abbe's most celebrated portraits include his rare double portraits of silent film stars Rudolph Valentino and his wife Natasha Rambova, sisters Lillian and Dorothy Gish, a nude Bessie Love, as well as dancers including the Dolly Sisters and Anna Pavlova, all taken in the 1920s.

=== Photojournalism ===
According to his daughter Tilly, "He called his photography 'a ticket' to the world." In the late 1920s and early 1930s, he traveled throughout Europe as a photojournalist, documenting the unstable political landscape of the era. Reflecting the changing fashions in the magazines content, Abbe became one of the first photojournalist to submit his work in photo-essays to major publications, including The London Magazine, Vu and the Berliner Illustrirte Zeitung. He also took photographs during the Spanish Civil War and the Nazis' rise in Germany.

In the 1920s and '30s, Abbe photographed politicians, stage and film stars—Hitler and Mussolini, Charlie Chaplin, and Josephine Baker—and scored the biggest coup of his career when he finagled his way into the Kremlin and, according to Miss Tilly, "tricked" Joseph Stalin into posing for him, resulting a rare snapshot of the Soviet dictator smiling. His portrait of Stalin was famously used to stop rumors that the Soviet leader was dead.

== Personal life ==
Abbe was married four times and had eight surviving children.

He first married Eloise Turner in 1905; she died in November 1907.

His second marriage was to Phyllis Edwards, a teacher from Richmond, Virginia, whom he married in 1909. They had three children: Elizabeth (Beth), born 1910; Phyllis, born 1911; and James, born 1912. James Abbe Jr also became a photographer and later an antiques dealer, and worked for Harper's Bazaar in the 1940s.

The marriage ended when James Abbe traveled to Italy in 1922 with a former Ziegfeld dancer, Polly Platt (née Mary Ann Shorrock). She was part of the company filming Ronald Colman and Lillian Gish in The White Sister (1923) on location in Rome and Naples. Abbe took stills and advised on special photography. After filming was completed, Abbe settled in Paris, where Polly gave birth to three children: Patience Shorrock Abbe on July 22, 1924; Richard W. Abbe (1926–2000); and John Abbe (born 1927).

In the late 1930s, Abbe's third marriage to Polly Shorrock ended in divorce.

He then married Irene Caby, the mother of ballet dancer and dance teacher Tilly (Matilda) and Malinda (Linda) Abbe. Tilly was born when her father was 56 years old, around 1939. Tilly said that "[she was] named after a dancer he photographed, Tilly Losch. He loved ballet, and his favorite subject to photograph was Anna Pavlova. I knew how much he loved dancers, and of course it was very important to me to please my father."

== Publications ==
- Abbe, James (1934). I Photograph Russia. New York: Robert M. McBride.
- Earley, Mary Dawn (1975). Stars of the Twenties, Observed by James Abbe. London: Thames and Hudson. ISBN 978-0-500-01138-6.
- Abbe, James; Johnson, Brooks; Pepper, Terence (2000). James Abbe Photographer. Norfolk, Virginia: Chrysler Museum of Art. ISBN 978-0-940744-69-1.
