= Seca GmbH =

German company

seca GmbH & Co. KG.
- Company type: GmbH & Co. KG
- Industry: Biomedical Engineering and Life Science
- Founded: 1840
- Headquarters: Hamburg, Germany
- Products: Medical scales and measuring instruments
- Owner: Frederik Vogel; Robert Vogel
- Number of employees: > 300
- Website: http://www.seca.com

seca GmbH & Co. KG. is a German company that develops, produces and sells weighing scales and measuring instruments. It's an international market leader and, because of its high degree of specialisation, it is considered a hidden champion. Its products are exported to more than 110 countries. The company’s headquarters is in Hamburg and it has branches in Austria, France, the United Kingdom, Switzerland, Japan, China, Mexico, Colombia, Finland, Malaysia, United Arab Emirates, Brazil and the United States.

== Foundation and history ==
In 1840, master locksmith A.C.C. Joachims established a scale manufacturing business in Hamburg after learning from the Strasbourg mechanic and monk Friedrich Alois Quintenz who had invented the decimal scale in 1821. Over the course of the next thirty years, the Joachim's workshop evolved into a small factory. However, following his death in 1874, the business stagnated and the factory's prominence waned until 1988, when Frederik Vogel, a young businessman, acquired and revitalised the factory. Vogel expanded the product range and introduced the brand name "seca" which he had registered for a trademark in 1897. The brand name was derived from the Latin word secare meaning 'to cut'. The name refers to the "cutting edge", the crucial contact surface on a balance beam, where a smaller surface area enhances a mechanical scale's precision.

The company survived World War I and the Great Depression in the 20th century. In 1934 Frederik Vogel passed the management over to his son Robert. Robert Vogel steered the company through World War II and began with the successful post-war reconstruction immediately after the end of the war. When Robert Vogel died in 1966, his son Sönke Vogel joined the company.

In 1970, Sönke Vogel implemented a pivotal shift in the company's focus toward medical measuring and weighing, repositioning seca as a leader in producing essential diagnostic and therapeutic tools. Since then, seca has specialised in developing products that accurately measure patients' weight, height, and body composition. One of the key technologies employed is bioimpedance analysis, which utilises a low-current method to assess critical health metrics such as fat mass, fat-free mass, skeletal muscle mass, visceral fat, total body water/extracellular water, and phase angle. The product portfolio has been consistently expanded and is available on all international markets.

In March 2010, Sönke Vogel stepped back from day-to-day operations and joined the company's advisory board. Robert and Frederik Vogel junior, the sons of Sönke Vogel, subsequently joined the management board and took over the leadership. Robert M. Vogel overseeing Sales & Marketing, and Frederik Vogel handling Technology and Development.

== Corporate structure ==
seca GmbH & Co. KG. has the following subsidiaries:

- seca France, Semur-en-Auxois, France
- seca United Kingdom, Birmingham, United Kingdom
- seca North America West, Los Angeles, CA, United States
- seca North America East, Hanover, MD, United States
- seca Schweiz, Reinach, Switzerland
- seca Zhong Guo, Hangzhou, China
- seca Nihon, Chiba, Japan
- seca Mexico, Mexico City, Mexico
- seca Middle East, Dubai, United Arab Emirates
- seca Brasil, São Paulo, Brazil
- seca Suomi, Espoo, Finland
- seca Latin America, Bogotá, Colombia
- seca Asia Pacific, Kuala Lumpur, Malaysia

== Products ==
The range includes:

- Baby scales
- Column scales
- Flat scales
- Multifunction and wheelchair scales
- Bed and dialysis scales
- Height measuring and measuring instruments
- Medical Body Composition Analyzer
