= Liz Theoharis =

American theologian (born 1976)

- Born: Elizabeth Armen Theoharis; February 18, 1976 (age 50)
- Education: University of Pennsylvania (BA); Union Theological Seminary (MDiv, MPhil, PhD)
- Occupations: anti-poverty activist, pastor, biblical scholar
- Spouse: Chris Caruso
- Relatives: Athan Theoharis (father); Jeanne Theoharis (sister)
- Website: Official website

Elizabeth Armen "Liz" Theoharis (born February 18, 1976) is an American theologian who is the co-chair (along with William Barber II) of the Poor People's Campaign: A National Call for a Moral Revival, and the Director of the Kairos Center for Religions, Rights, and Social Justice at Union Theological Seminary. She is an ordained minister in the Presbyterian Church (USA).

== Education ==
Theoharis received her BA in Urban Studies from the University of Pennsylvania in 1998. In 2004 she received her Master of Divinity from Union Theological Seminary with Columbia University, and her Master of Philosophy in 2009 and PhD as the Henry Berg Scholar in New Testament and Christian Origins in 2014 from the same institution. The title of her dissertation was "Will 'The Poor Be With You Always?': Towards a Methodological Approach of Reading the Bible with the Poor".

== Anti-poverty activism ==
In 1994, Theoharis moved from her hometown of Milwaukee, Wisconsin to Philadelphia, Pennsylvania to attend the University of Pennsylvania. While there she became involved in Empty the Shelters, a student organization dedicated to ending homelessness related to the National Union of the Homeless, and the Kensington Welfare Rights Union. In 1995, as part of KWRU, she participated in the takeover of the abandoned St. Edward the Confessor Catholic Church in Philadelphia by dozens of homeless families. In 2003, along with other leaders from KWRU and the related Poor Peoples Economic Human Rights Campaign, she established the Poverty Initiative at Union Theological Seminary and the "Poverty Scholars Program" to build a network of grassroots organizations united around ending poverty.

The Poverty Initiative launched the Kairos Center for Religions, Rights, and Social Justice, with Theoharis as one of its two co-directors (along with Larry Cox), in 2013.

In 2017, Theoharis' first book, Always With Us? What Jesus Really Said About the Poor was published. The book combines reflections on her experiences as an organizer and educator in Philadelphia and with the Poverty Initiative with Biblical scholarship and theology to argue that Jesus' words in Matthew 26:11—"The poor you will always have with you"—are part of the Bible's call to end poverty. Later that year the book was made recommended reading for all Presbyterian Church (U.S.A.) congregations through the denomination's "One Church, One Book" initiative.

Also in 2017, Theoharis became a national co-chair, with Rev. Dr. William Barber II, of the Poor People's Campaign: A National Call for Moral Revival. During 2017 and the first half of 2018, she traveled to various parts of the country to advance the local organizing of the campaign, including Detroit, MI; Harlan County, KY; Selma, AL; and Charleston, WV. During the Poor People's Campaign: A National Call for Moral Revival's "40 Days of Action" in May–June 2018, she was arrested while leading a prayer on the steps of the Supreme Court as part of the campaign's protests in Washington, D.C. The next day a statement prepared by her was read out in a hearing with members of the Congress and Senate. In November 2018, Theoharis and Rev. Dr. William Barber II gave an official TED talk titled "A Call for a Moral Revival". In December 2018, Revive Us Again: Vision and Action in Moral Organizing, a book she co-authored with Rev. Dr. William Barber II and Rev. Dr. Rick Lowery, was published.

In 2019, as a co-chair of the campaign, she participated in "National Emergency Truth and Poverty Tours" organized in various states, meant to highlight the problems facing diverse poor communities in the United States, and the solutions being proposed by the campaign and local organizations. She was the co-chair of the campaign's "Poor People's Moral Action Congress," held from June 17-19th, 2019 at Trinity Washington University in Washington, D.C. At the event, she co-moderated a town hall with candidates for the 2020 Democratic Primary and testified before the House Budget Committee, along with other leaders from the campaign.

== Selected works ==
- We Cry Justice: Reading the Bible with the Poor People’s Campaign , Edited by Rev. Dr. Liz Theoharis, foreword by Rev. Dr. William Barber II (Broadleaf Books 2021)
- Always with Us?: What Jesus Really Said about the Poor, Foreword by Rev. Dr. William Barber II (Eerdmans 2017)
- "Reading the Bible with the Poor: Building a Social Movement, Led by the Poor, as a United Social Force," (with Wille Baptist) in Bruce Worthington, ed., Reading the Bible in an Age of Crisis: Political Exegesis for a New Day (Augsburg Fortress Press, 2015).
- "And the Last Shall Be First" (with Kathy Maskell, Shailly Gupta Barnes, and Adam Barnes) in Vandana Shiva, ed., The Sacred Seed Golden Sufi Publishers, 2014.
- "Teach as we Fight, Learn as we Lead: Lessons in Pedagogy and the Poverty Initiative Model" (with Willie Baptist) in Willie Baptist and Jan Rehmann, eds., Pedagogy of the Poor: Building the Movement to End Poverty Teachers College Press, 2012.

== Awards ==
- 2021 30th Annual Freedom Award by the National Civil Rights Museum, along with the Rev. Dr. William Barber II, for their work with the Poor People's Campaign: A National Call for a Moral Revival.
- 2021 Hunger Leadership Award from the Congressional Hunger Center, along with the Rev. Dr. William Barber II.
- 2020 Named one of 15 Faith Leaders to Watch by the Center for American Progress.
- 2019 Unitas Distinguished Alumni/ae Award from Union Theological Seminary.
- 2019 Third Annual Bridge Award by the Selma Center for Nonviolence, Truth, and Reconciliation.
- 2019 Sojourners 11 Women Shaping Church
- 2018 PathMakers to Peace Award from Brooklyn for Peace
- 2018 Politico 50: thinkers, doers and visionaries whose ideas are driving politics, with Rev. Dr. William J Barber, II.
- 2018 Women of Faith Award by the Presbyterian Mission Agency of the Presbyterian Church (USA)
- 2018 Peaceseeker Award by the Presbyterian Peace Fellowship, with Rev. Dr. William J Barber, II.
- 2004-2014 Henry Berg Fellowship from the Union Theological Seminary (New York City)
- 2012 Union Theological Seminary (New York City)'s 175th Anniversary Gala Honoree, along with Anna Deavere Smith and Eboo Patel
