= Southerly Magazine =

American magazine

- Formation: 2016
- Dissolved: 2023
- Location: United States
- Products: News
- Official language: English
- Key people: Lyndsey Gilpin
- Website: https://southerlymag.org/

Southerly Magazine was an independent, non-profit American media organization focusing on justice, equality, and culture in the American South that ran from 2018 to 2023. The magazine was founded by Lyndsey Gilpin, who hoped that the magazine would fill in the gaps in a region vastly underserved in environmental reporting and storytelling. The organization was sponsored by the Institute for Journalism and Natural Resources (IJNR). It started as an email newsletter in 2016, and restructured as a news organization in 2018. Gilpin retired from the project and closed it down in May 2023.
