= Poor People's Campaign: A National Call for a Moral Revival =

American anti-poverty campaign

- Named after: Poor People's Campaign
- Location: United States
- Co-chair: William Barber II
- Co-chair: Liz Theoharis
- Website: www.poorpeoplescampaign.org

Poor People's Campaign: A National Call for a Moral Revival is an American anti-poverty campaign led by William Barber II and Liz Theoharis.

== Goals and mission ==
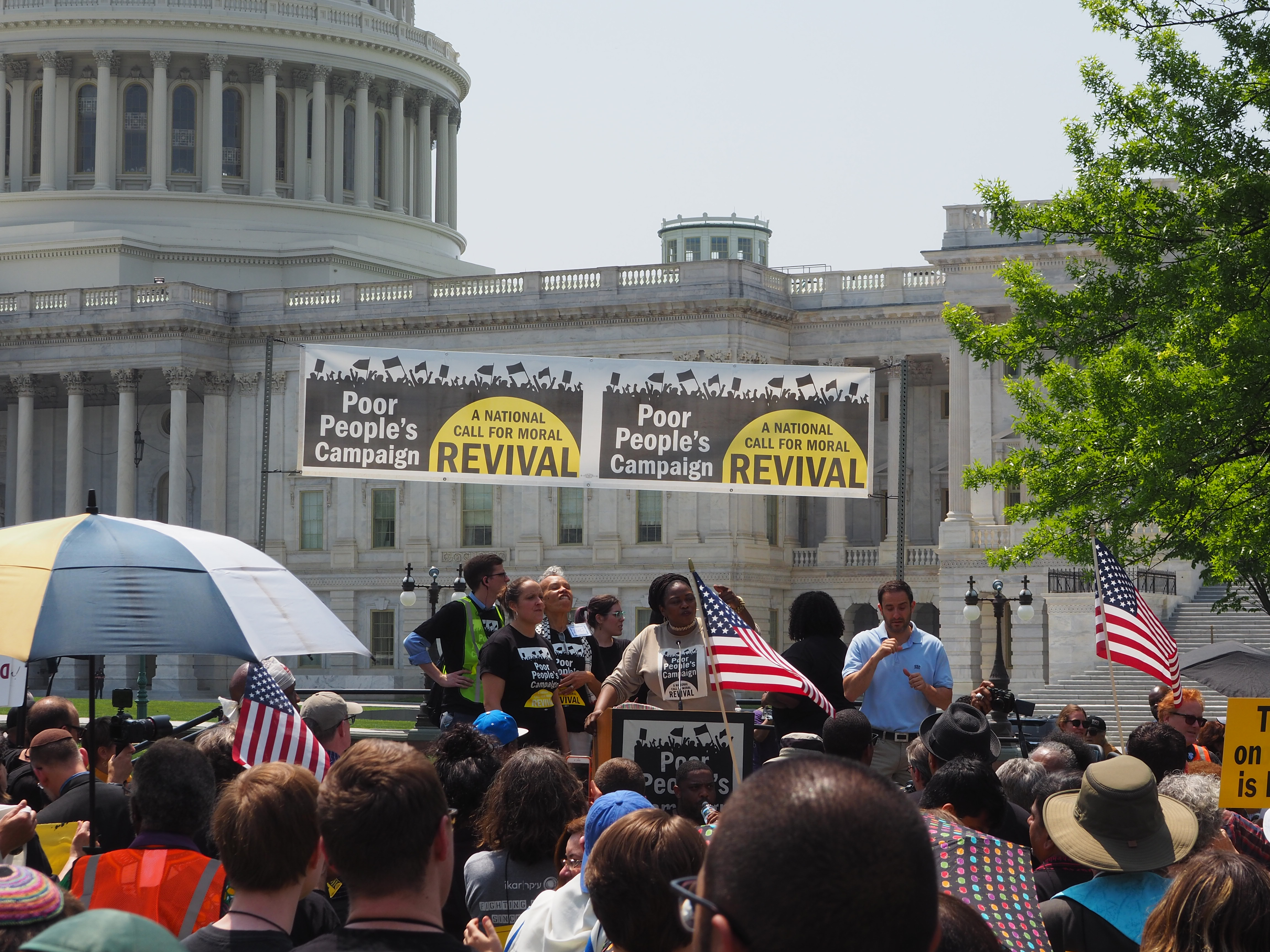
Poor People's Campaign Revival, 14 May 2018

According to Jelani Cobb, writing in The New Yorker, the movement demands "federal and state living-wage laws, equity in education, an end to mass incarceration, a single-payer health-care system, and the protection of the right to vote." The aim of the campaign centers on connecting movements that seem to be interconnected, such as racism, sexism, anti-Native American policies, ableism, and classism.

The campaign takes its name from the original 1968 Poor People's Campaign, which was an effort to gain economic justice for poor people in the United States, organized by Martin Luther King Jr. and the Southern Christian Leadership Conference (SCLC), and carried out under the leadership of Ralph Abernathy in the wake of King's assassination.

Barber has explained the movement saying, "This is about the moral center. This is about our humanity." The campaign is supported by the International Union, United Automobile, Aerospace, and Agricultural Implement Workers of America (UAW).

== 40 days of civil disobedience ==
They performed "40 days of coordinated action in the spring of 2018 at statehouses across the US", starting in May. The main event was hosted at the National Mall in Washington, D.C. The focus of the events were on the "triple evils": racism, poverty, and militarism. Thousands of people marched in Washington, D.C., coming from at least 32 states. More than 20 state's representatives were called on stage, along with representatives for Native Americans living on reservations. People from as far as Alaska joined the crowd. People within the movement are also participants in other organizations who feel that their goals are being pushed forward by the campaign, such as "Fight for $15", who aims to raise the national minimum wage to a living wage; Our Children, Our Future, a West Virginian group including Amy Jo Hutchison that organizes parents of children to fight against poverty; and Voices of Community Activist and Leaders - New York, a group from Harlem that builds power for New Yorkers who are impacted by HIV/AIDS, mass incarceration, drug wars, and homelessness.

On May 21, 2018, 21 protesters were arrested in Nashville, Tennessee. This protest marked the 50-year anniversary of the Poor People's Campaign's building of a shantytown called Resurrection City. Barber said of the event, “This is not a commemoration of what happened 50 years ago. This is a reenactment and reinauguration.”

On June 4, 2018, 16 protesters were arrested in Topeka, Kansas.

After a Supreme Court decision determining that purging inactive Ohio voters from the registration lists is constitutional in Husted v. Randolph Institute, Barber and Theoharis were arrested and detained for 26 hours at the Supreme Court. A week prior, Dr. Theoharis was arrested in Lansing, Michigan.

On June 23, the campaign hung two banners on both sides of a raised stage at the National Mall that read, "Fight Poverty Not The Poor."

More than 2,000 people were arrested nationwide during the 40 day protest. Protesters participated in a variety of nonviolent direct actions, including "stopp[ing] traffic and petition[ing] state legislatures."

== Comparisons to the 1960s Poor People's Campaign ==
Barber has stated, "We have these mythologies about the civil rights movement, about what it took to bring about change in America, but none of that happened overnight. You need to have a long-term vision. This right here, this is only our foundation."

The new movement aims to address the issues that Martin Luther King Jr. spoke against in his original campaign.

== Ongoing activities ==
The movement has mobilized thousands of grassroots events. Demonstrators held Moral Mondays at state capitols, protesting inequality and calling for a Third Reconstruction after the first and second movements.

In 2024, the Poor People's Campaign held press conferences in 30 states.
