= Kenneth O'Reilly =

American historian

- Occupation: Professor of History
- Known for: Academic studies on the FBI

Academic background
- Education: University of Detroit (BA), Central Michigan University (MA)
- Alma mater: Marquette University (PhD)

Academic work
- Discipline: 20th-century U.S. History
- Sub-discipline: FBI
- Notable works: Racial Matters: The FBI's Secret File on Black America, 1960-1972
- Website: https://www.kennethoreilly.com/

Kenneth O'Reilly is an American professor emeritus of 20th-century U.S. history who has written several books on the Federal Bureau of Investigation and its impact on the Federal government of the United States of America.

== Background ==
O'Reilly was born in New York City in 1951.

He obtained a BA from the University of Detroit, an MA from Central Michigan University, and doctorate from Marquette University.

== Career ==
O'Reilly taught at Marquette University, the University of Wisconsin at Milwaukee, and the University of Alaska Anchorage.

He is emeritus professor of history at the University of Alaska Anchorage and now teaches at the Milwaukee Area Technical College. He lives in Milwaukee, Wisconsin.

In 1988, the New York Times cited his expertise, stating, "Kenneth O'Reilly, professor of history at the University of Alaska at Anchorage and author of Hoover and the Unamericans, said that wiretapping was so pervasive from the 1940s to the 1960s that virtually everyone was overheard who was important in Washington politics."

== Awards ==
O'Reilly has received a Chancellor's Awards for Excellence in Research and Teaching, plus grants and fellowships from numerous institutes and foundations that include: Gerald R. Ford Foundation, the Franklin and Eleanor Roosevelt Institute, the Gustavus Myers Center for the Study of Human Rights, the Fund for Investigative Journalism, the John F. Kennedy Library Foundation, the National Endowment for the Humanities, the Lyndon B. Johnson Foundation, the American Philosophical Society, and the Harry S. Truman Library Institute.

== Works ==
Racial Matters was a New York Times notable book of 1989.

In 2010, historian Daniel Leab cited O'Reilly's book as important in understanding the impact of the FBI on other federal bodies such as the House Un-American Activities Committee (HUAC). Specifically, his book Hoover and the Un-Americans is "still very pertinent... [because, as O'Reilly wrote] the FBI fed information to HUAC, and it did so consistently from before 1946" [as O'Reilly's book traces].

Books:

- Hoover and the Un-Americans: The FBI, HUAC, and the Red Menace (Philadelphia: Temple University Press, 1983)
- Racial Matters: The FBI's Secret File on Black America, 1960-1972 (New York: Free Press, 1989)
- Black Americans: The FBI File (New York: Carol & Graf, 1994)
- Nixon's Piano: Presidents and Racial Politics from Washington to Clinton (1995)
- Holy Cow 2000: The Strange Election of George W. Bush

== See also ==
- Federal Bureau of Investigation
- House Un-American Activities Committee

== External sources ==
- University of Marquette: Kenneth O'Reilly Papers
