= Southern Early Childhood Association =

Educational organization

Founded in 1948, the Southern Early Childhood Association (or SECA) serves as a professional organization for members of the early childhood profession in the states of Alabama, Arkansas, Florida, Georgia, Kentucky, Louisiana, Mississippi, North Carolina, Oklahoma, South Carolina, Tennessee, Texas, Virginia, and West Virginia. It is a separate and distinct organization from NAEYC with its own governing body, its own position statements, and its own scholar journal (Dimensions of Early Childhood).

As a response to flooding on the Gulf Coast of the United States in 2005, SECA undertook a number of projects to help preschool-age children and programs in the affected areas.
