= William Barber II =

American minister and political activist

The Reverend William Barber II
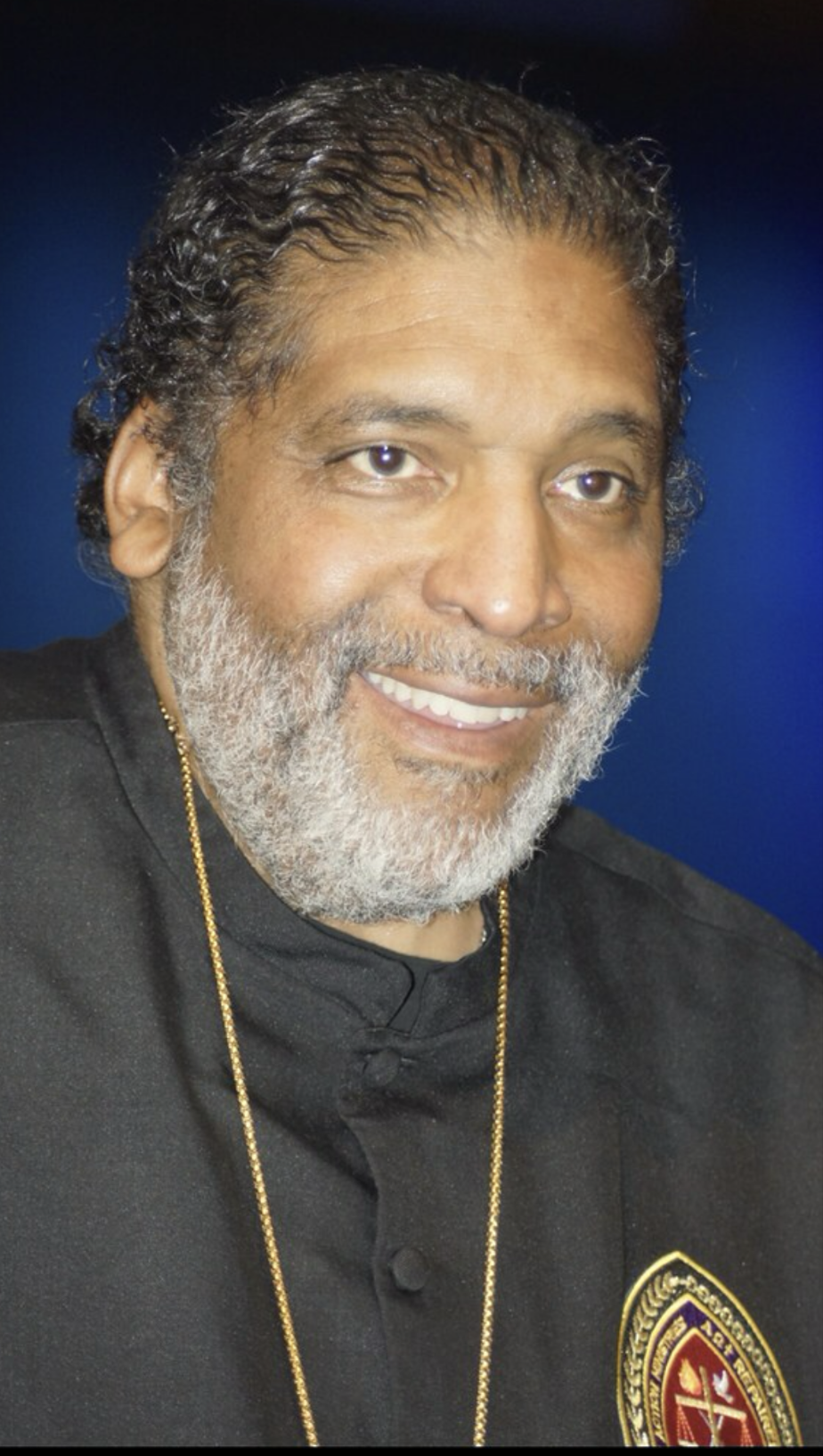

Personal details
- Born: William Joseph Barber II; August 30, 1963 (age 63) Indianapolis, Indiana, U.S.
- Denomination: Disciples of Christ
- Spouse: Rebecca McLean
- Occupation: minister, activist, academic
- Education: North Carolina Central University (BA); Duke University (MDiv); Drew University (DMin)

William J. Barber II (born August 30, 1963) is an American Mainline Protestant minister, social activist, professor in the Practice of Public Theology and Public Policy and founding director of the Center for Public Theology & Public Policy at Yale Divinity School. He is the president and senior lecturer at Repairers of the Breach and co-chair of the Poor People's Campaign: A National Call for a Moral Revival. He also serves as a member of the national board of the National Association for the Advancement of Colored People (NAACP) and is the chair of its legislative political action committee. From 2006 to 2017, Barber served as president of the NAACP's North Carolina state chapter, the largest in the Southern United States and the second-largest in the country. He pastored Greenleaf Christian Church (Disciples of Christ) in Goldsboro, North Carolina, from 1993 to 2023.

== Education and family ==
Barber was born in Indianapolis to Eleanor Barber and William J. Barber Sr, who then moved their young family to Washington County, North Carolina, to participate in the desegregation of the public school system there.

Barber was elected president of the local NAACP youth council in 1978, at the age of 15. At 17, he became student body president of his high school, the first president to serve the integrated school for an entire year, breaking the previous tradition of alternating a black president & white president for each semester. He then enrolled at North Carolina Central University (NCCU) and became student government president at age 19. He received his bachelor's degree in political science from NCCU, cum laude in 1985; a Master of Divinity degree from Duke University in 1989; and a doctorate from Drew University with a concentration in public policy and pastoral care in 2003.

In 1984, he met a first-year NCCU student, Rebecca McLean, at a march in support of Jesse Jackson's presidential campaign; they married in 1987.

In his early 20s, Barber was diagnosed with ankylosing spondylitis, which has affected his spine ever since. In December 2023, employees at AMC Theatres in Greenville refused a reasonable accommodation for his condition. He had been attending a screening of The Color Purple with his 90-year-old mother. Police were called on Barber when he objected, and he agreed to leave or be cited for trespassing. AMC Theatres chairman and CEO Adam Aron issued an apology the next day.

== Activism ==
Beginning in April 2013, Barber led regular "Moral Mondays" civil-rights protests in North Carolina's state capital, Raleigh. The Wall Street Journal credited Barber's NAACP chapter with forming a coalition in 2007 named Historic Thousands on Jones Street People's Assembly, composed of 93 North Carolina advocacy groups. "With this changing demographic, we had to operate in coalition", Barber was quoted as saying. Historian and professor Timothy Tyson named Barber, "the most important progressive political leader in this state in generations", saying that he "built a statewide interracial fusion political coalition that has not been seriously attempted since 1900". An article in the Michigan State Law Review, "Confronting Race: How a Confluence of Social Movements Convinced North Carolina to Go where the McCleskey Court Wouldn't" credits him with bringing together a statewide political coalition. He "has become as well known [in North Carolina] as [Governor] Pat McCrory and Republican leaders of the House and Senate", according to a 2013 Huffington Post profile of him. He traveled with NAACP President and CEO Benjamin Todd Jealous to meet with Georgia prison officials.

In 2014, he founded Repairers of the Breach, a 501(c)(3) non-profit organization "formed to educate and train religious and other leaders of faith who will pursue policies and organizational strategies for the good of the whole and to educate the public about connections between shared religious faith".

In 2016, he delivered a speech at the Democratic National Convention; the address was described as rousing and was well received.

In May 2017, Barber was arrested after refusing to leave the North Carolina State Legislative Building during a protest over health care legislation. The following month, a state magistrate banned Barber and the other protesters from entering the Legislative Building. Barber and his lawyers contend that the ban is unconstitutional, because the state constitution guarantees citizens the right to assemble to communicate with their legislators.

In May 2017, Barber announced he would step down from the state NAACP presidency to lead "a new 'Poor People's Campaign'", named Poor People's Campaign: A National Call for a Moral Revival in honour of the original 1968 campaign founded by Martin Luther King Jr.

Barber preached at the interfaith prayer service for President Joe Biden's inauguration.

In July 2021, Barber called for a "season of nonviolent direct action" to bring attention to threats to democracy in the U.S.. He was arrested alongside hundreds of others in Washington, D.C., on August 2 in a peaceful protest for voting rights and higher wages.

In April 2025, Barber was arrested while praying in the United States Capitol rotunda. He had delivered a sermon on the Capitol steps and delivered a Moral Monday address at the U.S. Supreme Court earlier in the day.

In February 2026, Barber organized a 51-mile protest march from Wilson to Raleigh to protest congressional gerrymandering.

== Awards and recognition ==
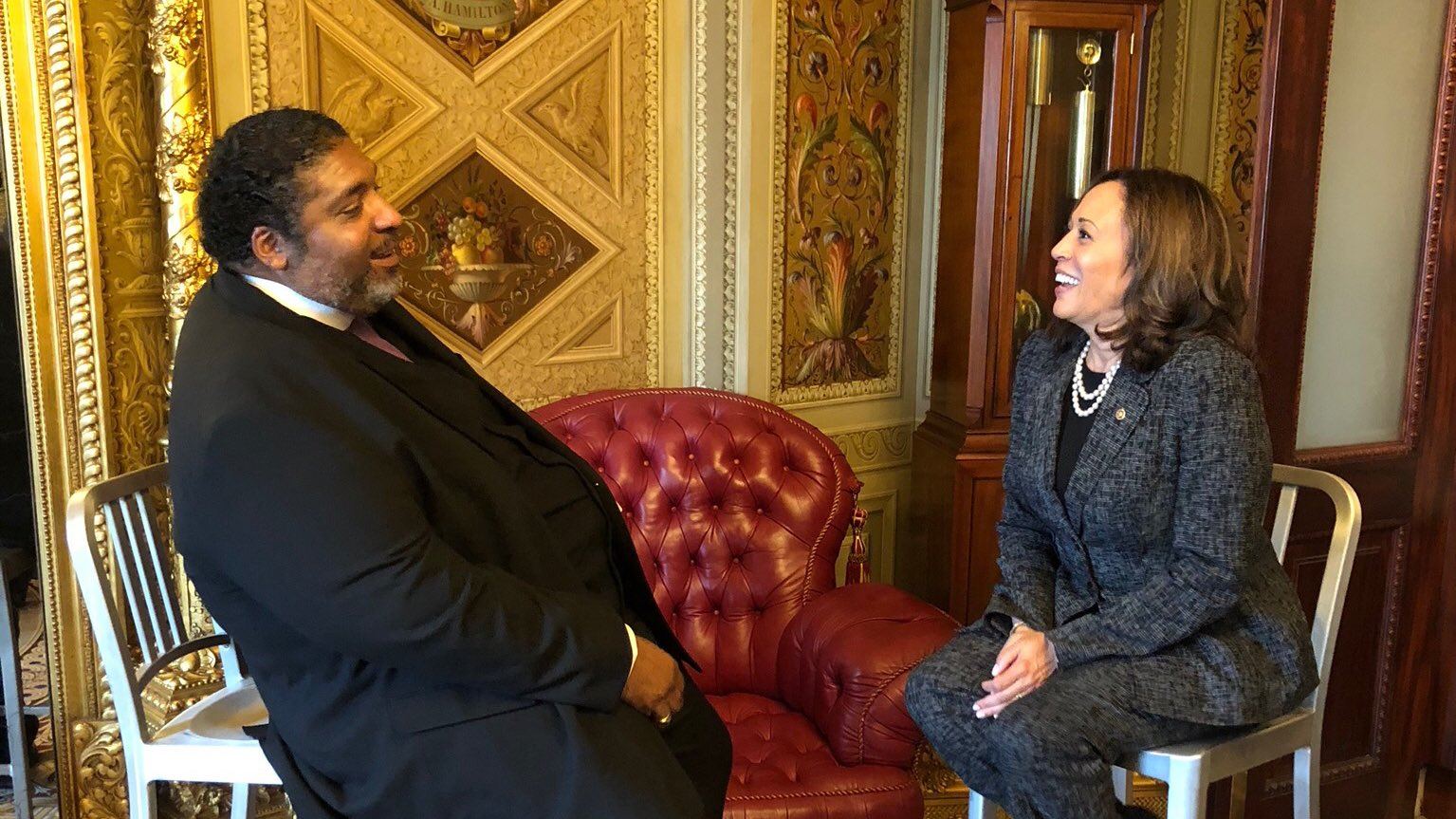
Barber meeting with Senator and future Vice President Kamala Harris in 2018

Barber was awarded the 2006 Juanita Jackson Mitchell, Esq. Award for legal activism, the highest award in the NAACP for legal redress for advocacy, he was the 2008 recipient of the Thalheimer Award for most programmatic NAACP State Conference, and in 2010 he won the National NAACP Kelly M. Alexander Humanitarian Award.

North Carolina Governor Bev Perdue awarded him the Order of the Long Leaf Pine in 2010—a North Carolina citizenship award presented to outstanding North Carolinians who have a proven record of service to the state.

In 2017, Barber was awarded an honorary doctorate from Drew University, his alma mater, and also delivered the university's sesquicentennial address at commencement exercises. Barber was also awarded an honorary doctorate from Occidental College preceding his speech (which was also livestreamed) to students, alumni, and community members in Thorne Hall.

In 2018, Barber was named a MacArthur Fellow for "building broad-based fusion coalitions as part of a moral movement to confront racial and economic inequality".

Barber is a senior fellow at the Kettering Foundation, an American non-partisan research foundation.

== Publications ==
- Preaching Through Unexpected Pain (self-published)
- Forward Together: A Moral Message for the Nation (Chalice Press, 2014, ISBN 0827244940).
- The Third Reconstruction: Moral Mondays, Fusion Politics, and the Rise of a New Justice Movement (Beacon Press, 2016, ISBN 0807083607)
- Revive Us Again: Vision and Action in Moral Organizing (Beacon Press, 2018, ISBN 9780807025604)
- We Are Called To Be A Movement (Workman Publishing Co., Inc., 2020), ISBN 978-1-5235-1124-2
- White Poverty: How Exposing Myths About Race and Class Can Reconstruct American Democracy (WW Norton & Co, 2024), ISBN 978-1-3240-9487-6
