= Babe Ruth =

American baseball player (1895–1948)

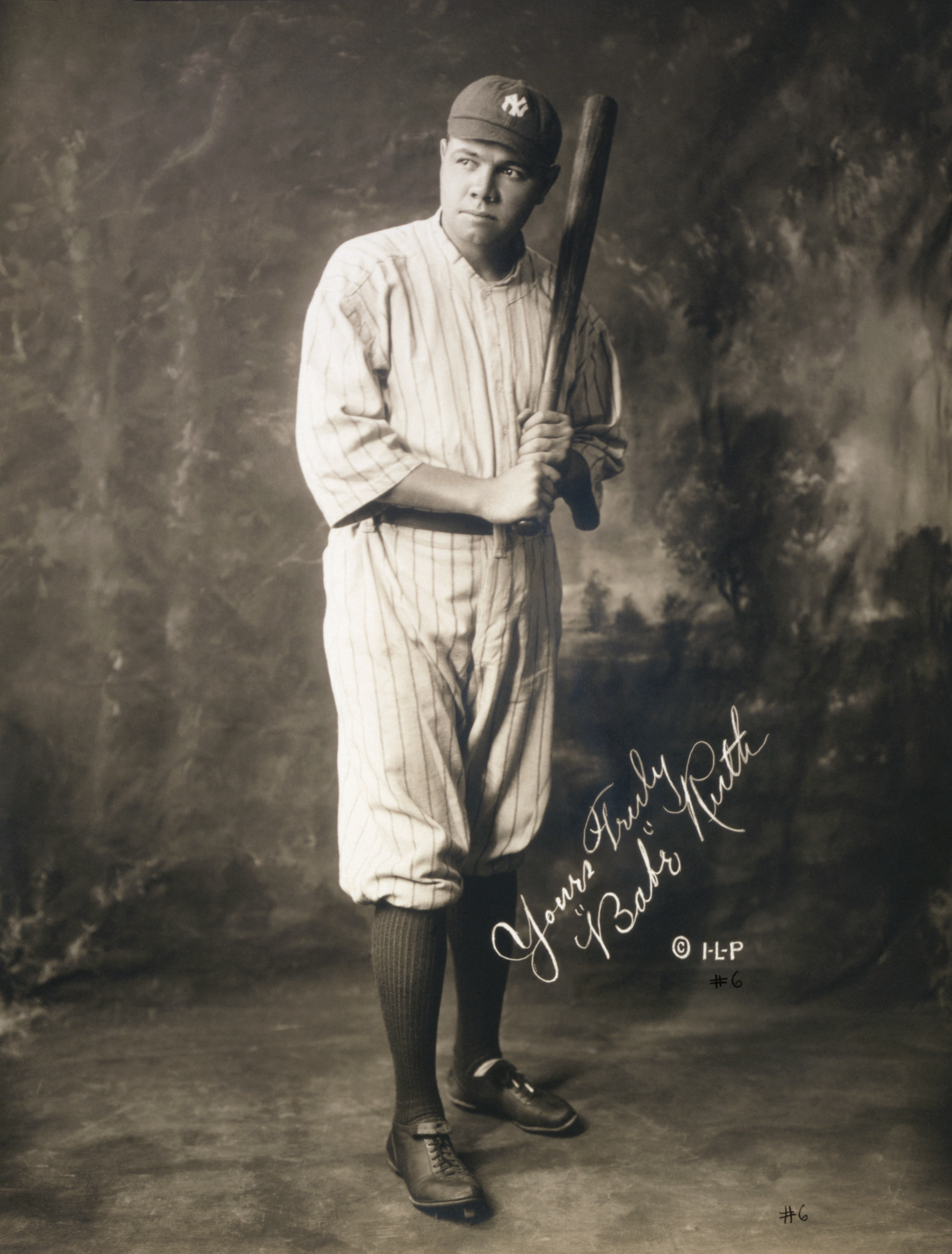
- Ruth in 1920
- Outfielder / Pitcher
- Born: February 6, 1895; Baltimore, Maryland, U.S.
- Died: August 16, 1948 (aged 53); New York City, U.S.
- Batted: Left Threw: Left

MLB debut
- July 11, 1914, for the Boston Red Sox

Last MLB appearance
- May 30, 1935, for the Boston Braves

MLB statistics
- Batting average: .342
- Hits: 2,873
- Home runs: 714
- Runs batted in: 2,214
- Slugging percentage: .690
- Win–loss record: 94–46
- Earned run average: 2.28
- Strikeouts: 488
- Stats at Baseball Reference

Teams
- As player: Boston Red Sox (1914–1919); New York Yankees (1920–1934); Boston Braves (1935); As coach: Brooklyn Dodgers (1938)

Career highlights and awards
- 2× All-Star (1933, 1934); 7× World Series champion (1915, 1916, 1918, 1923, 1927, 1928, 1932); AL MVP (1923); AL batting champion (1924); 12× AL home run leader (1918–1921, 1923, 1924, 1926–1931); 6× AL RBI leader (1919–1921, 1923, 1926, 1928); AL ERA leader (1916); New York Yankees No. 3 retired; Monument Park honoree; Boston Red Sox Hall of Fame; Major League Baseball All-Century Team; Major League Baseball All-Time Team; Other career achievements and records

Member of the National

Baseball Hall of Fame
- Induction: 1936
- Vote: 95.1% (first ballot)

George Herman "Babe" Ruth (February 6, 1895 – August 16, 1948) was an American professional baseball player whose career in Major League Baseball (MLB) spanned 22 seasons, from 1914 through 1935. Nicknamed "the Bambino" and "the Sultan of Swat", he began his MLB career as a star left-handed pitcher for the Boston Red Sox, but achieved his greatest fame as a slugging outfielder for the New York Yankees. Ruth is regarded as one of the greatest sports heroes in American culture and is considered by many to be the greatest baseball player of all time. In 1936, Ruth was elected to the Baseball Hall of Fame as one of its "first five" members.

Born in Baltimore, Ruth was sent to St. Mary's Industrial School for Boys at age seven. In 1914, Ruth was signed to play Minor League baseball for the Baltimore Orioles but was soon sold to the Red Sox. By 1916, he had built a reputation as an outstanding pitcher who sometimes hit long home runs, a feat unusual for any player in the dead-ball era. Although Ruth twice won 23 games in a season as a pitcher and was a member of three World Series championship teams with the Red Sox, he wanted to play every day and was allowed to convert to an outfielder. With regular playing time, he broke the MLB single-season home run record in 1919 with 29.

After that season, Red Sox owner Harry Frazee sold Ruth to the Yankees amid controversy. The trade fueled Boston's subsequent 86-year championship drought and popularized the "Curse of the Bambino" superstition. In his 15 years with the Yankees, Ruth helped the team win seven American League (AL) pennants and four World Series championships. His big swing led to escalating home run totals that not only drew fans to the ballpark and boosted the sport's popularity but also helped usher in baseball's live-ball era, which evolved from a low-scoring game of strategy to a sport where the home run was a major factor. As part of the Yankees' vaunted "Murderers' Row" lineup of 1927, Ruth hit 60 home runs, which extended his own MLB single-season record by a single home run. Ruth's last season with the Yankees was 1934, and he retired after a short stint with the Boston Braves the following year. In his career, he led the AL in home runs 12 times.

During Ruth's career, he was the target of intense press and public attention for his baseball exploits and off-field penchants for drinking and womanizing. After his retirement as a player, he was denied the opportunity to manage a major league club, most likely because of poor behavior during parts of his playing career. In his final years, Ruth made many public appearances, especially in support of American efforts in World War II. In 1946, he became ill with nasopharyngeal cancer and died from the disease two years later. Ruth remains a major figure in American culture.

== Early life ==
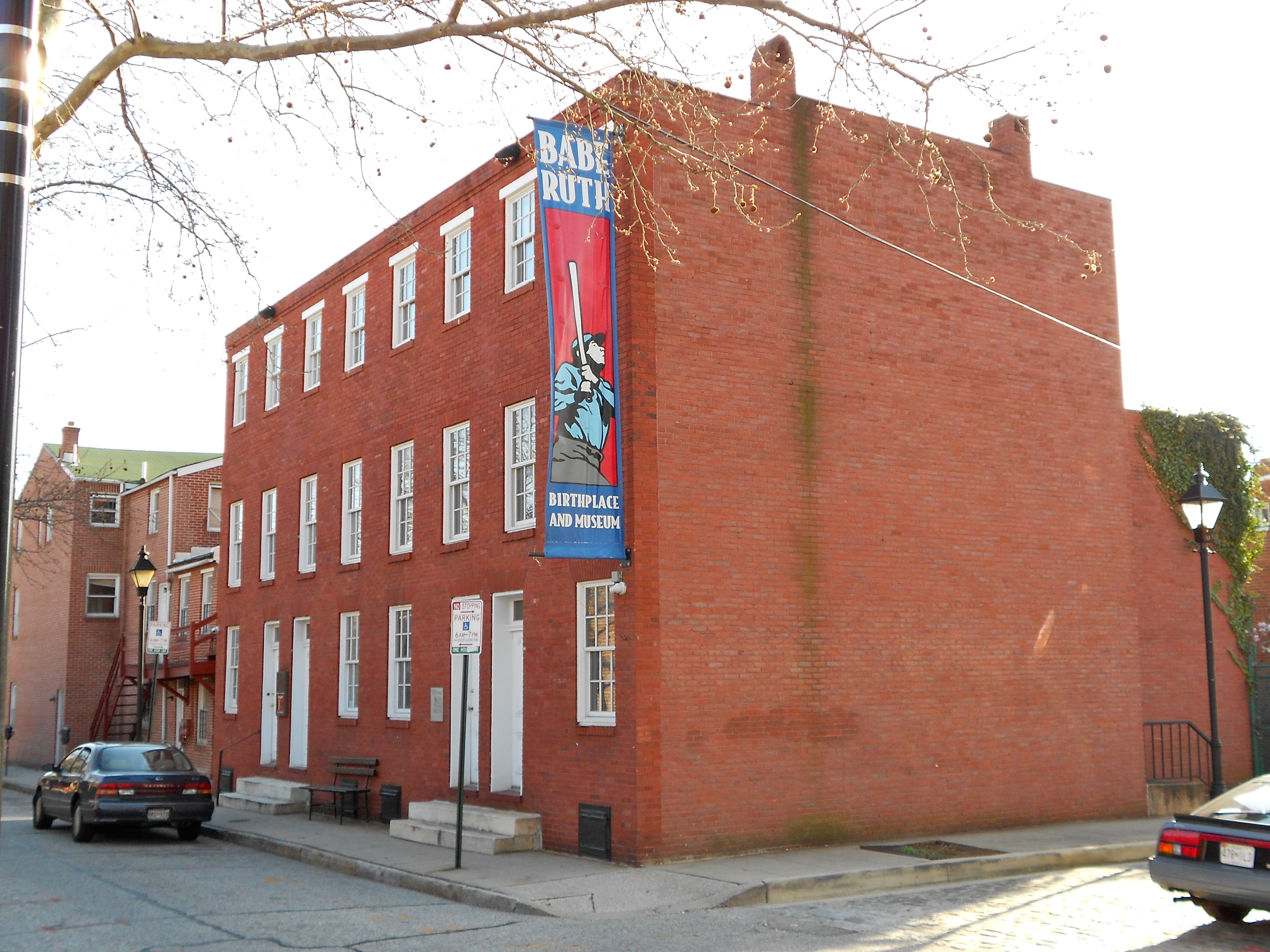
Ruth's birthplace in Baltimore, Maryland

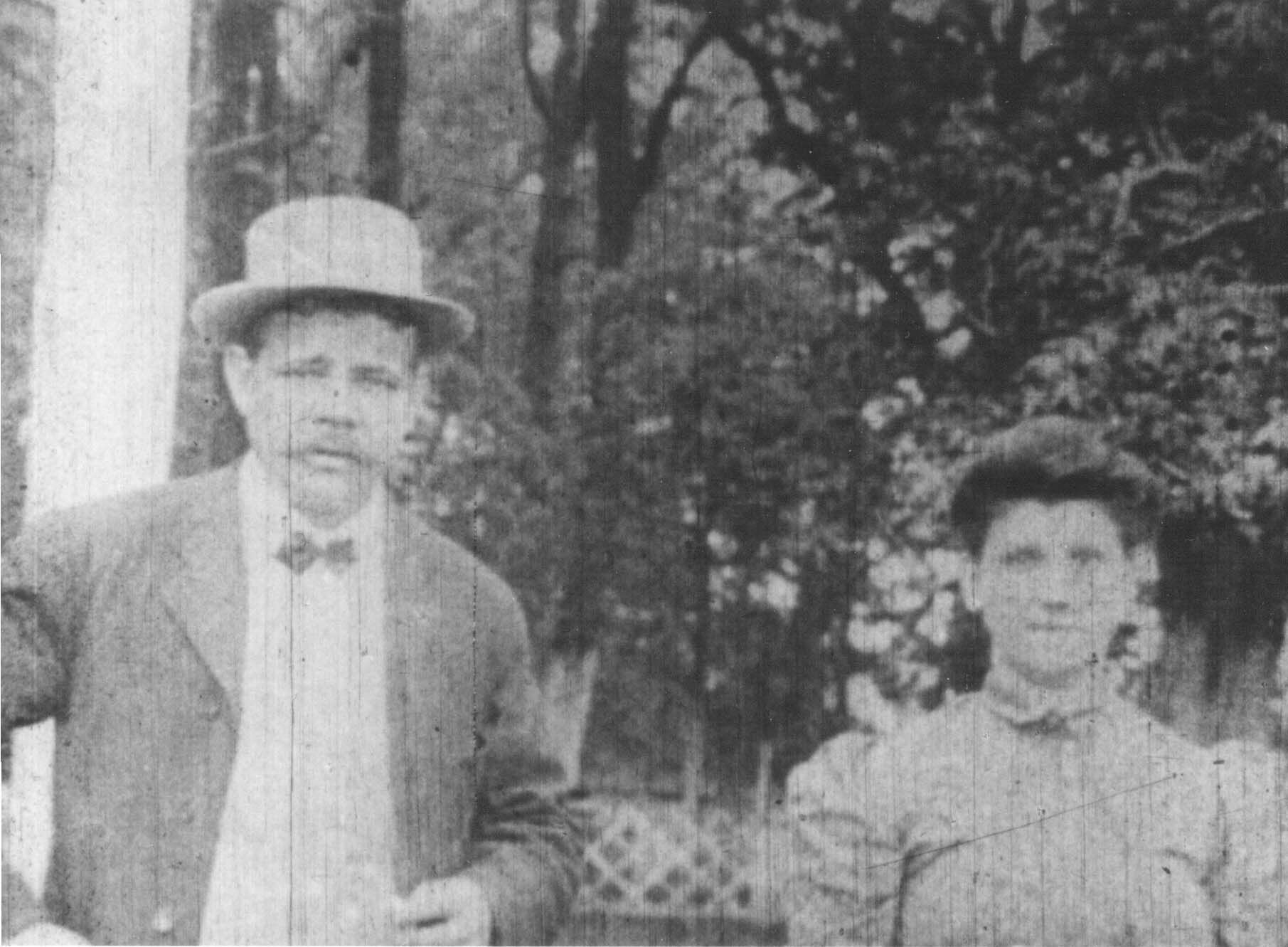
Babe Ruth's parents, George Herman Sr. and Katherine

George Herman Ruth Jr. was born on February 6, 1895, at 216 Emory Street in the Pigtown neighborhood of Baltimore, in a house which belonged to his maternal grandfather Pius Schamberger, a German immigrant and trade unionist. Ruth's parents, Katherine (née Schamberger) and George Herman Ruth Sr., were both of German ancestry. Ruth Sr. worked a series of jobs that included lightning rod salesman and streetcar operator. The elder Ruth then became a counterman in a family-owned combination grocery and saloon business. Only one of Ruth's seven siblings, his younger sister Mamie, survived infancy.

Many details of Ruth's childhood are unknown. As a child, Ruth spoke German. When Ruth was a toddler, the family moved to 339 South Woodyear Street; by the time he was six years old, his father had a saloon with an upstairs apartment at 426 West Camden Street. Details are equally scanty about why Ruth was sent at the age of seven to St. Mary's Industrial School for Boys, a reformatory and orphanage. However, according to Julia Ruth Stevens' recount in 1999, because George Sr. was a saloon owner and had given Ruth little supervision, he became a delinquent. As an adult, Ruth admitted that as a youth he ran the streets, rarely attended school, and drank beer when his father was not looking. Some accounts say that following a violent incident at his father's saloon, the city authorities decided that this environment was unsuitable for a child. Ruth entered St. Mary's on June 13, 1902. He was recorded as "incorrigible" and spent much of the next 12 years there.

Although St. Mary's boys received an education, students were also expected to learn work skills and help operate the school, particularly once the boys turned 12. Ruth became a shirtmaker and a proficient carpenter. He adjusted his own shirt collars, even during his well-paid baseball career. The boys, aged 5 to 21, did most of the work around the facility, and renovated St. Mary's in 1912. The Xaverian Brothers who ran the school insisted on strict discipline; corporal punishment was common. Ruth's nickname there was "Niggerlips", as he had large facial features and was darker than most boys at the all-white reformatory.

Ruth was sometimes allowed to rejoin his family or was placed at St. James's Home, a supervised residence with work in the community, but he was always returned to St. Mary's. He was rarely visited by his family; his mother died when he was 12 and, by some accounts, he was permitted to leave St. Mary's only to attend the funeral. How Ruth came to play baseball there is uncertain: according to one account, his placement at St. Mary's was due in part to repeatedly breaking windows with long hits while playing street ball; by another, he was told to join a team on his first day at St. Mary's by the school's athletic director, Brother Herman, becoming a catcher even though left-handers rarely play that position. During his time there he also played third base and shortstop, again unusual for a left-hander, and was forced to wear gloves made for right-handers. He was encouraged in his pursuits by the school's Prefect of Discipline, Brother Matthias Boutlier. Brother Matthias was greatly respected by the boys both for his strength and for his fairness. For the rest of his life, Ruth would praise Brother Matthias, and his running and hitting styles closely resembled his teacher's. Ruth stated, "I think I was born as a hitter the first day I ever saw him hit a baseball." The older man became a mentor and role model to Ruth; biographer Robert W. Creamer commented on the closeness between the two:

Ruth revered Brother Matthias ... which is remarkable, considering that Matthias was in charge of making boys behave and that Ruth was one of the great natural misbehavers of all time. ... George Ruth caught Brother Matthias' attention early, and the calm, considerable attention the big man gave the young hellraiser from the waterfront struck a spark of response in the boy's soul ... [that may have] blunted a few of the more savage teeth in the gross man whom I have heard at least a half-dozen of his baseball contemporaries describe with admiring awe and wonder as "an animal."

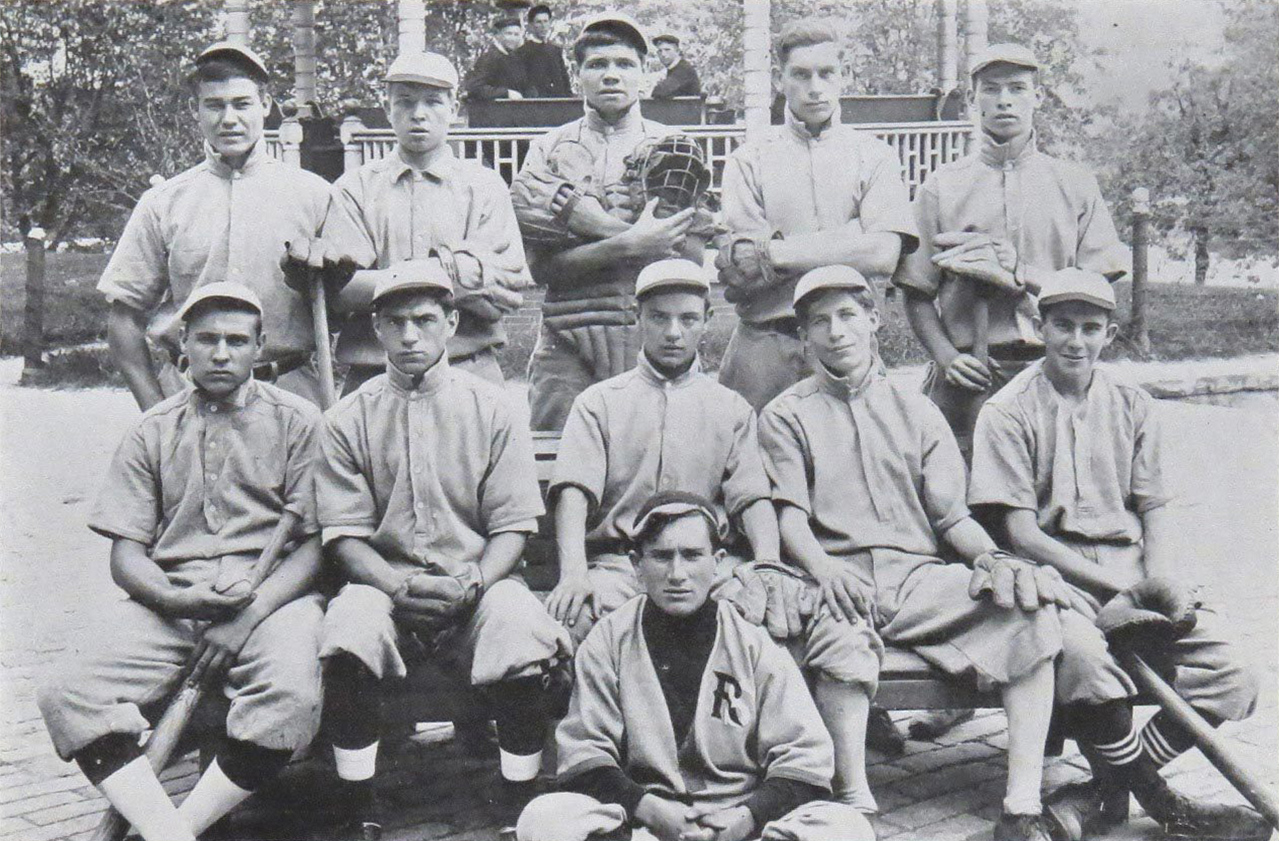
Ruth (top row, center) at St. Mary's Industrial School for Boys in Baltimore, Maryland, in 1912

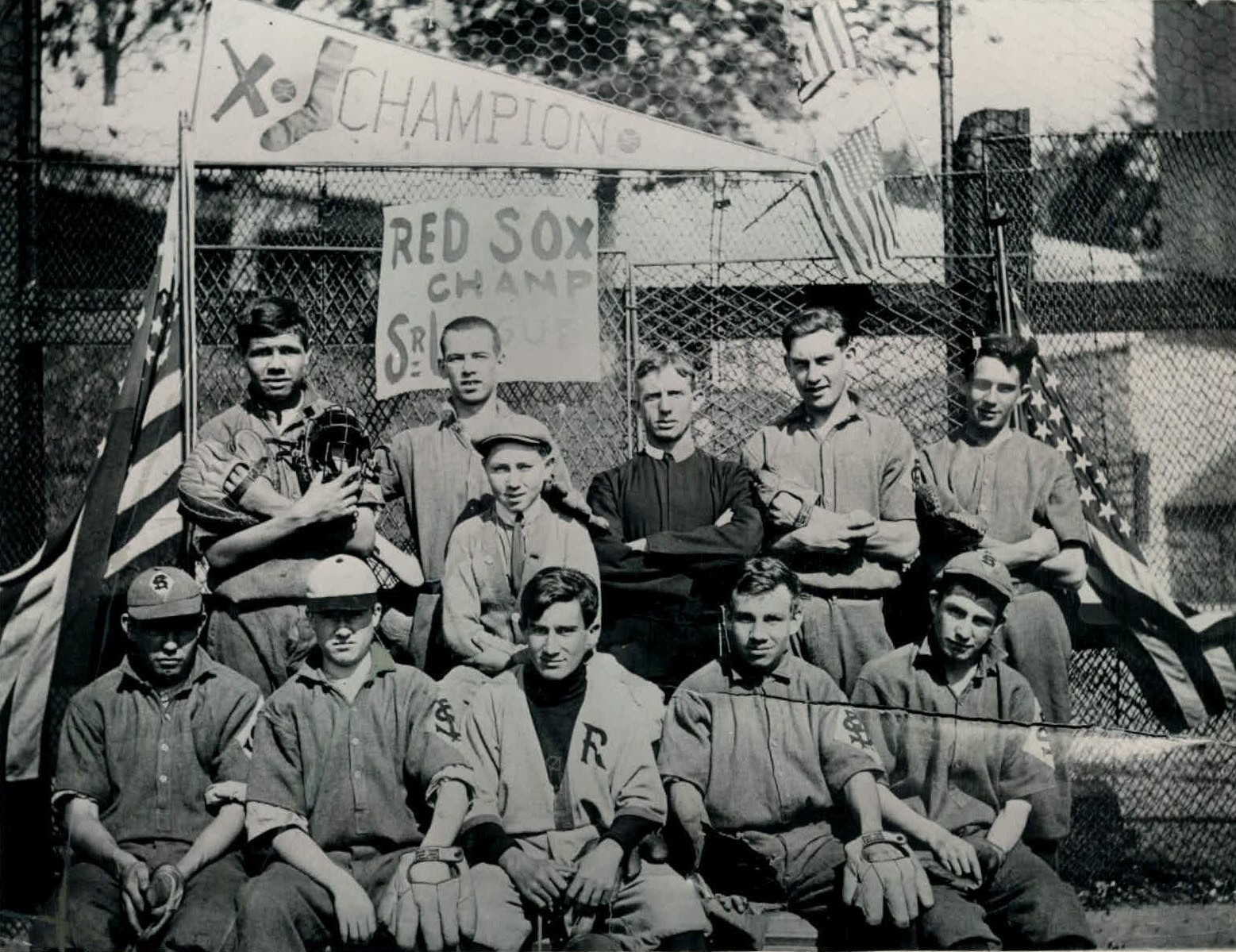
Ruth (top row, left, holding a catcher's mitt and mask) at St. Mary's, 1912

The school's influence remained with Ruth in other ways. He was a lifelong Catholic who would sometimes attend Mass after carousing all night, and he became a well-known member of the Knights of Columbus. He would visit orphanages, schools, and hospitals throughout his life, often avoiding publicity. He was generous to St. Mary's as he became famous and rich, donating money and his presence at fundraisers, and spending $5,000 to buy Brother Matthias a Cadillac in 1926—subsequently replacing it when it was destroyed in an accident. Nevertheless, his biographer Leigh Montville suggests that many of the off-the-field excesses of Ruth's career were driven by the deprivations of his time at St. Mary's.

Most of the boys at St. Mary's played baseball in organized leagues at different levels of proficiency. Ruth later estimated that he played 200 games a year as he steadily climbed the ladder of success. Although he played all positions at one time or another, he gained stardom as a pitcher. According to Brother Matthias, Ruth was laughing at the bumbling pitching efforts of fellow students, and Matthias told him to go in and see if he could do better. Ruth had become the best pitcher at St. Mary's, and when he was 18 in 1913, he was allowed to leave the premises to play weekend games on community teams. He was mentioned in several newspaper articles, for both his pitching prowess and ability to hit long home runs.

== Professional baseball ==
=== Minor leagues: Baltimore Orioles ===
In early 1914, Ruth signed a professional baseball contract with Jack Dunn, who owned and managed the minor-league Baltimore Orioles, an International League team. The circumstances of Ruth's signing are not known with certainty. By some accounts, Dunn was urged to attend a game between an all-star team from St. Mary's and one from another Xaverian facility, Mount St. Mary's College. Some versions have Ruth running away before the eagerly awaited game, to be punished, and then returning to pitch St. Mary's to victory as Dunn watched. Others have Washington Senators pitcher Joe Engel, a Mount St. Mary's graduate, pitching in an alumni game after watching a preliminary contest between the college's freshmen and a team from St. Mary's, including Ruth. Engel watched Ruth play, then told Dunn about him at a chance meeting in Washington. Ruth, in his autobiography, stated only that he worked out for Dunn for a half hour, and was signed. According to biographer Kal Wagenheim, there were legal difficulties to be straightened out as Ruth was supposed to remain at the school until he turned 21, though (Note: Ruth long thought his birthday was February 7, 1894. This was, in fact, the birthday of an elder brother of the same name, who died soon after birth. Ruth learned this when he needed a passport in 1934.) SportsCentury stated in a documentary that Ruth had already been discharged from St. Mary's when he turned 19, and earned a monthly salary of $100.

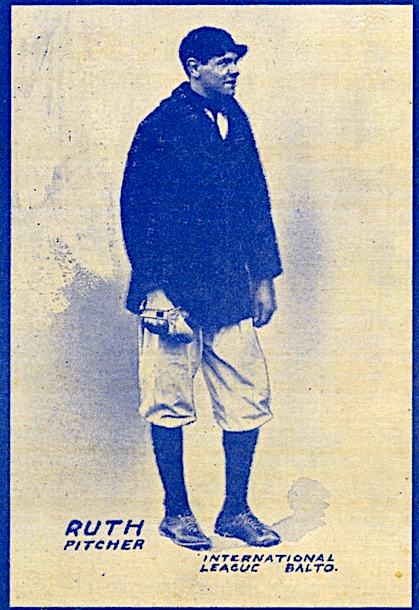
Baseball card showing Ruth as a Baltimore Oriole, 1914

The train journey to spring training in Fayetteville, North Carolina, in March was likely Ruth's first outside the Baltimore area. The rookie ballplayer was the subject of various pranks by veteran players, who were probably also the source of his famous nickname. There are various accounts of how Ruth came to be called "Babe", but most center on his being referred to as "Dunnie's babe" (or some variant). SportsCentury reported that his nickname was gained because he was the new "darling" or "project" of Dunn, not only because of Ruth's raw talent, but also because of his lack of knowledge of the proper etiquette of eating out in a restaurant, being in a hotel, or being on a train. "Babe" was, at that time, a common nickname in baseball, with perhaps the most famous to that point being Pittsburgh Pirates pitcher and 1909 World Series hero Babe Adams, who appeared younger than his actual age.

Ruth made his first appearance as a professional ballplayer in an inter-squad game on March 7, 1914. He played shortstop and pitched the last two innings of a 15–9 victory. In his second at-bat, Ruth hit a long home run to right field; the blast was locally reported to be longer than a legendary shot hit by Jim Thorpe in Fayetteville. Ruth made his first appearance against a team in organized baseball in an exhibition game versus the major-league Philadelphia Phillies. Ruth pitched the middle three innings and gave up two runs in the fourth, but then settled down and pitched a scoreless fifth and sixth innings. In a game against the Phillies the following afternoon, Ruth entered during the sixth inning and did not allow a run the rest of the way. The Orioles scored seven runs in the bottom of the eighth inning to overcome a 6–0 deficit, and Ruth was the winning pitcher.

Once the regular season began, Ruth was a star pitcher who was also dangerous at the plate. The team performed well, yet received almost no attention from the Baltimore press. A third major league, the Federal League, had begun play, and the local franchise, the Baltimore Terrapins, restored that city to the major leagues for the first time since 1902. Few fans visited Oriole Park, where Ruth and his teammates labored in relative obscurity. Ruth may have been offered a bonus and a larger salary to jump to the Terrapins; when rumors to that effect swept Baltimore, giving Ruth the most publicity he had experienced to date, a Terrapins official denied it, stating it was their policy not to sign players under contract to Dunn.

The competition from the Terrapins caused Dunn to sustain large losses. Although by late June the Orioles were in first place, having won over two-thirds of their games, the paid attendance dropped as low as 150. Dunn explored a possible move by the Orioles to Richmond, Virginia, as well as the sale of a minority interest in the club. These possibilities fell through, leaving Dunn with little choice other than to sell his best players to major league teams to raise money. He offered Ruth to the reigning World Series champions, Connie Mack's Philadelphia Athletics, but Mack had his own financial problems. The Cincinnati Reds and New York Giants expressed interest in Ruth, but Dunn sold his contract, along with those of pitchers Ernie Shore and Ben Egan, to the Boston Red Sox of the American League (AL) on July 4. The sale price was announced as $25,000 but other reports lower the amount to half that, or possibly $8,500 plus the cancellation of a $3,000 loan. Ruth remained with the Orioles for several days while the Red Sox completed a road trip, and reported to the team in Boston on July 11.

=== Boston Red Sox (1914–1919) ===
==== Developing star ====
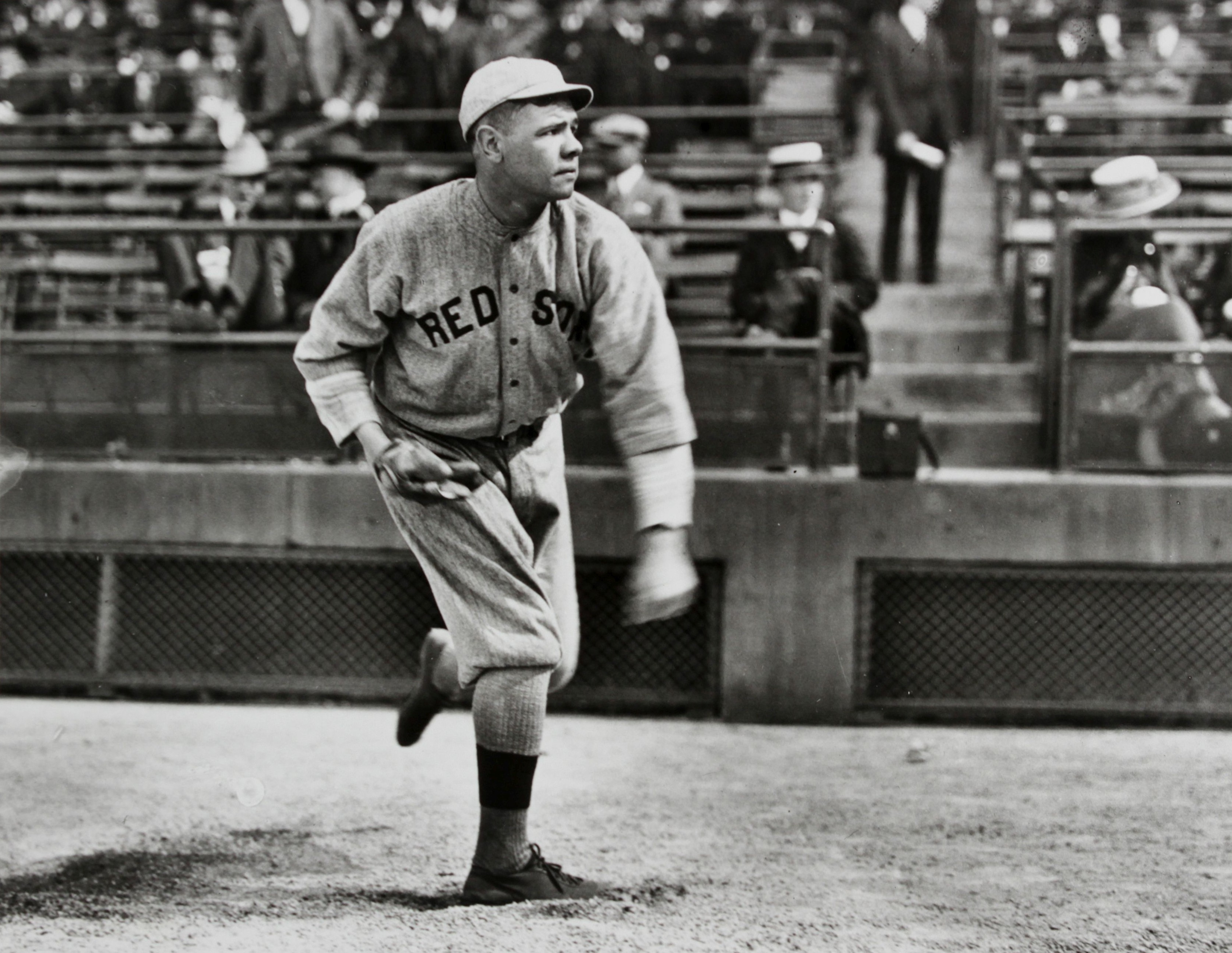
Ruth pitching for the Boston Red Sox

On July 11, 1914, Ruth arrived in Boston with Egan and Shore. Ruth later told the story of how that morning he had met Helen Woodford, who would become his first wife. She was a 16-year-old waitress at Landers Coffee Shop, and Ruth related that she served him when he had breakfast there. Other stories, though, suggested that the meeting occurred on another day, and perhaps under other circumstances. Regardless of when he began to court his first wife, he won his first game as a pitcher for the Red Sox that afternoon, 4–3, over the Cleveland Naps. His catcher was Bill Carrigan, who was also the Red Sox manager. Shore was given a start by Carrigan the next day; he won that and his second start and thereafter was pitched regularly. Ruth lost his second start, and was thereafter little used. In his major league debut as a batter, Ruth went 0-for-2 against left-hander Willie Mitchell, striking out in his first at bat before being removed for a pinch hitter in the seventh inning. Ruth was not much noticed by the fans, as Bostonians watched the Red Sox's crosstown rivals, the Braves, begin a legendary comeback that would take them from last place on the Fourth of July to the 1914 World Series championship.

Egan was traded to Cleveland after two weeks on the Boston roster. During his time with the Red Sox, he kept an eye on the inexperienced Ruth, much as Dunn had in Baltimore. When he was traded, no one took his place as supervisor. Ruth's new teammates considered him brash and would have preferred him as a rookie to remain quiet and inconspicuous. When Ruth insisted on taking batting practice despite being both a rookie who did not play regularly and a pitcher, he arrived to find his bats sawed in half. His teammates nicknamed him "the Big Baboon", a name the swarthy Ruth, who had disliked the nickname "Niggerlips" at St. Mary's, detested. Ruth had received a raise on promotion to the major leagues and quickly acquired tastes for fine food, liquor, and women, among other temptations.

Manager Carrigan allowed Ruth to pitch two exhibition games in mid-August. Although Ruth won both against minor-league competition, he was not restored to the pitching rotation. It is uncertain why Carrigan did not give Ruth additional opportunities to pitch. There are legends—incorporated into the 1948 film The Babe Ruth Story—that Ruth had a habit of signaling his intent to throw a curveball by sticking out his tongue slightly, and that he was easy to hit until this changed. Creamer pointed out that it is common for inexperienced pitchers to display such habits, and needing to break this habit would not constitute a reason to not use him at all; Creamer suggested Carrigan was unwilling to use Ruth due to the rookie's poor behavior.

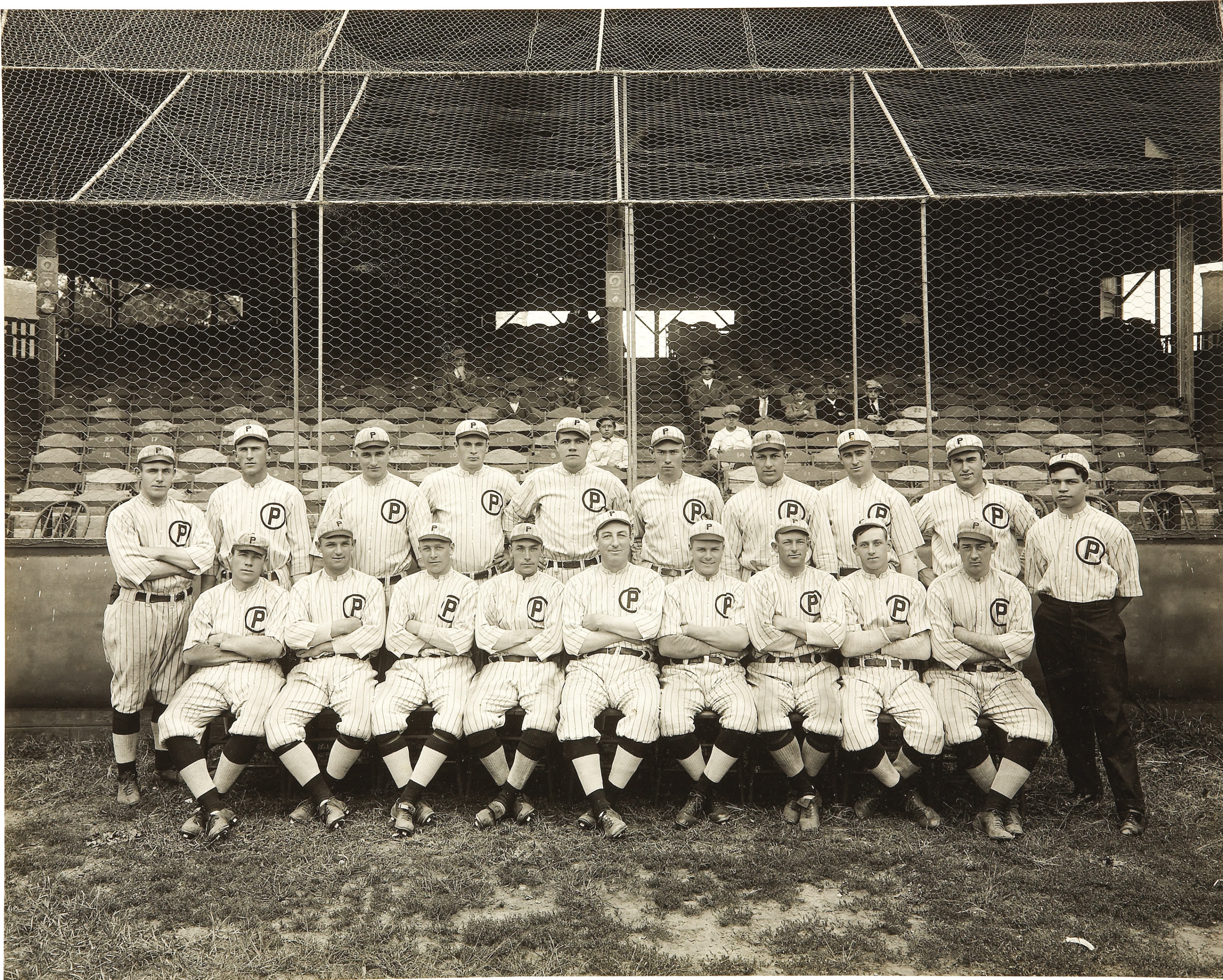
Providence Grays team photo with Babe Ruth (top row, center), 1914

On July 30, 1914, Boston owner Joseph Lannin had purchased the minor-league Providence Grays, members of the International League. The Providence team had been owned by several people associated with the Detroit Tigers, including star hitter Ty Cobb, and as part of the transaction, a Providence pitcher was sent to the Tigers. To soothe Providence fans upset at losing a star, Lannin announced that the Red Sox would soon send a replacement to the Grays. This was intended to be Ruth, but his departure for Providence was delayed when Cincinnati Reds owner Garry Herrmann claimed him by waiver. After Lannin wrote to Herrmann explaining that the Red Sox wanted Ruth in Providence so he could develop as a player, and would not release him to a major league club, Herrmann allowed Ruth to be sent to the minors. Carrigan later stated that Ruth was not sent down to Providence to make him a better player, but to help the Grays win the International League pennant (league championship).

Ruth joined the Grays on August 18, 1914. After Dunn's deals, the Baltimore Orioles managed to hold on to first place until August 15, after which they continued to fade, leaving the pennant race between Providence and Rochester. Ruth was deeply impressed by Providence manager "Wild Bill" Donovan, previously a star pitcher with a 25–4 win–loss record for Detroit in 1907; in later years, he credited Donovan with teaching him much about pitching. Ruth was often called upon to pitch, in one stretch starting (and winning) four games in eight days. On September 5 at Maple Leaf Park in Toronto, Ruth pitched a one-hit 9–0 victory, and hit his first professional home run, his only one as a minor leaguer, off Ellis Johnson. Recalled to Boston after Providence finished the season in first place, he pitched and won a game for the Red Sox against the New York Yankees on October 2, getting his first major league hit, a double. Ruth finished the season with a record of 2–1 as a major leaguer and 23–8 in the International League (for Baltimore and Providence). Once the season concluded, Ruth married Helen in Ellicott City, Maryland. Creamer speculated that they did not marry in Baltimore, where the newlyweds boarded with George Ruth Sr., to avoid possible interference from those at St. Mary's—both bride and groom were not yet of age and Ruth remained on parole from that institution until his 21st birthday.

In March 1915, Ruth reported to Hot Springs, Arkansas, for his first major league spring training. Despite a relatively successful first season, he was not slated to start regularly for the Red Sox, who already had two "superb" left-handed pitchers, according to Creamer: the established stars Dutch Leonard, who had broken the record for the lowest earned run average (ERA) in a single season; and Ray Collins, a 20-game winner in both 1913 and 1914. Ruth was ineffective in his first start, taking the loss in the third game of the season. Injuries and ineffective pitching by other Boston pitchers gave Ruth another chance, and after some good relief appearances, Carrigan allowed Ruth another start, and he won a rain-shortened seven inning game. Ten days later, the manager had him start against the New York Yankees at the Polo Grounds. Ruth took a 3–2 lead into the ninth, but lost the game 4–3 in 13 innings. Ruth, hitting ninth as was customary for pitchers, hit a massive home run into the upper deck in right field off of Jack Warhop. At the time, home runs were rare in baseball, and Ruth's majestic shot awed the crowd. The winning pitcher, Warhop, would in August 1915 conclude a major league career of eight seasons, undistinguished but for being the first major league pitcher to give up a home run to Babe Ruth.

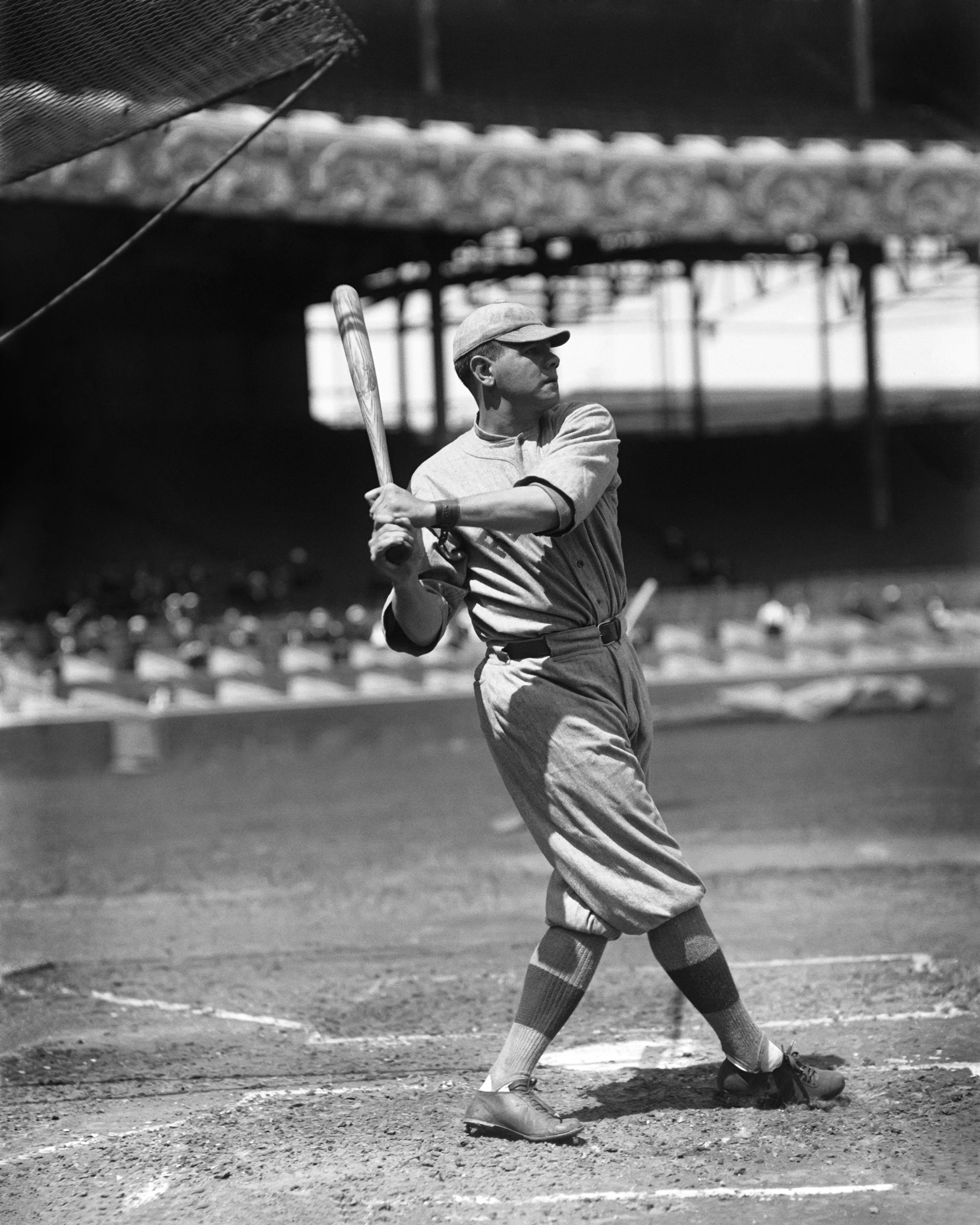
Ruth during batting practice with the Boston Red Sox in 1916

Carrigan was sufficiently impressed by Ruth's pitching to give him a spot in the starting rotation. Ruth finished the 1915 season 18–8 as a pitcher; as a hitter, he batted .315 and had four home runs. The Red Sox won the AL pennant, but with the pitching staff healthy, Ruth was not called upon to pitch in the 1915 World Series against the Philadelphia Phillies. Boston won in five games. Ruth was used as a pinch hitter in Game Five, but grounded out against Phillies ace Grover Cleveland Alexander. Despite his success as a pitcher, Ruth was acquiring a reputation for long home runs; at Sportsman's Park against the St. Louis Browns, a Ruth hit soared over Grand Avenue, breaking the window of a Chevrolet dealership.

In 1916, attention focused on Ruth's pitching as he engaged in repeated pitching duels with Washington Senators' ace Walter Johnson. The two met five times during the season with Ruth winning four and Johnson one (Ruth had a no decision in Johnson's victory). Two of Ruth's victories were by the score of 1–0, one in a 13-inning game. Of the 1–0 shutout decided without extra innings, AL president Ban Johnson stated, "That was one of the best ball games I have ever seen." For the season, Ruth went 23–12, with a 1.75 ERA and nine shutouts, both of which led the league. Ruth's nine shutouts in 1916 set a league record for left-handers that would remain unmatched until Ron Guidry tied it in 1978. The Red Sox won the pennant and World Series again, this time defeating the Brooklyn Robins (as the Dodgers were then known) in five games. Ruth started and won Game 2, 2–1, in 14 innings. Until another game of that length was played in 2005, this was the longest World Series game, (Note: An 18-inning World Series game, also between the Red Sox and Dodgers, was played in 2018.) and Ruth's pitching performance is still the longest postseason complete game victory.

Carrigan retired as player and manager after 1916, returning to his native Maine to be a businessman. Ruth, who played under four managers who are in the National Baseball Hall of Fame, always maintained that Carrigan, who is not enshrined there, was the best skipper he ever played for. There were other changes in the Red Sox organization that offseason, as Lannin sold the team to a three-man group headed by New York theatrical promoter Harry Frazee. Jack Barry was hired by Frazee as manager.

==== Emergence as a hitter ====
Ruth pitched a league-leading 35 complete games and went 24–13 with a 2.01 ERA and six shutouts in 1917, but the Sox finished in second place in the league, nine games behind the Chicago White Sox in the standings. On June 23 at Washington, when home plate umpire 'Brick' Owens called the first four pitches as balls, Ruth was ejected from the game and threw a punch at him, for which Ruth was suspended for ten days and fined $100. Ernie Shore was called in to relieve Ruth, and was allowed eight warm-up pitches. The runner who had reached base on the walk was caught stealing, and Shore retired all 26 batters he faced to win the game. Until 1991, this was listed as a perfect game for Ernie Shore. In 1991, Major League Baseball's (MLB) Committee on Statistical Accuracy amended it to be listed as a combined no-hitter. In 1917, Ruth was used little as a batter, other than for his plate appearances while pitching, and hit .325 with two home runs.

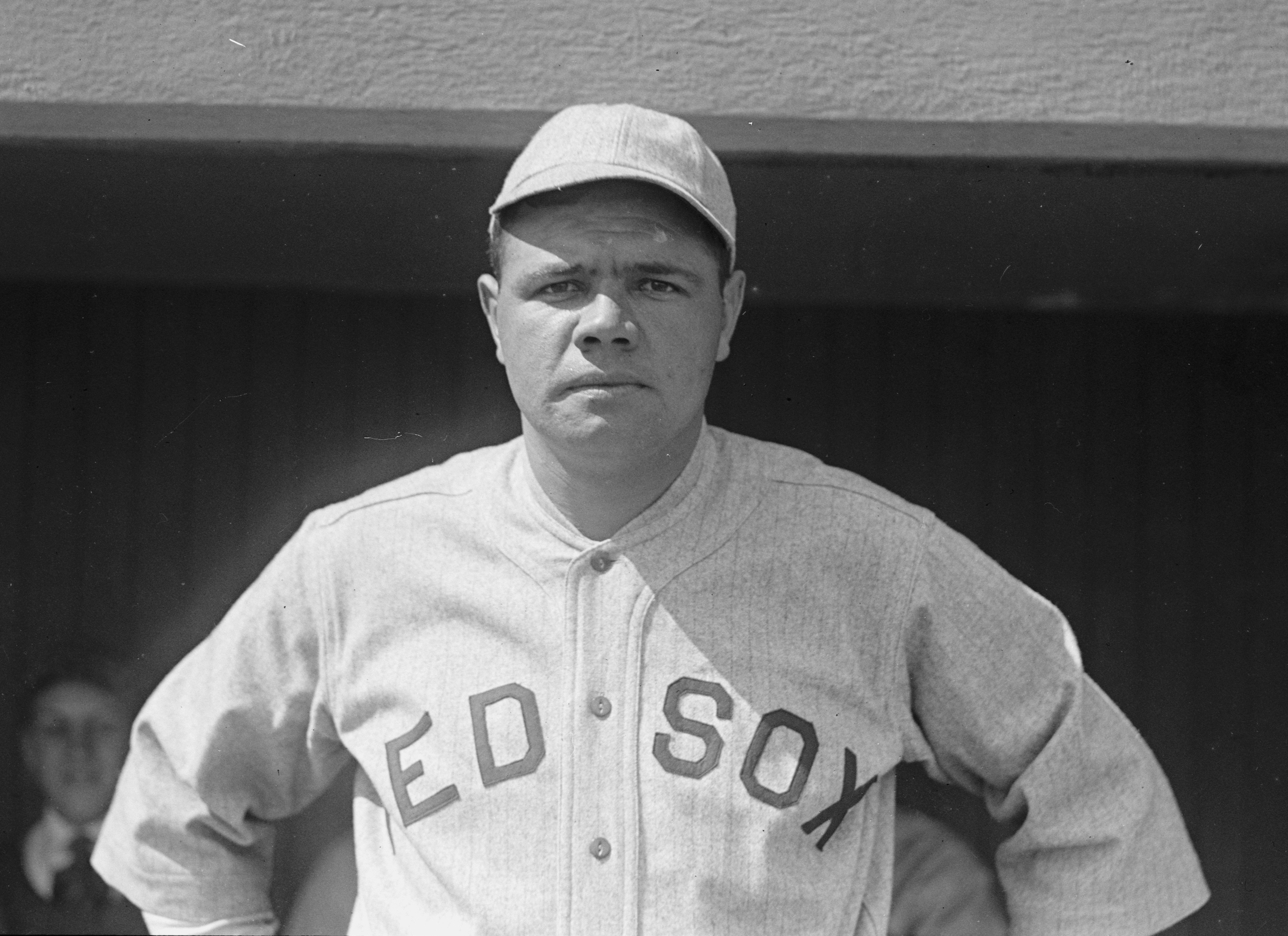
Ruth in 1918, his penultimate year with the Red Sox

The United States' entry into World War I occurred at the start of the season and overshadowed baseball. Conscription was introduced in September 1917, and most baseball players in the big leagues were of draft age. This included Barry, who was a player-manager, and who joined the Naval Reserve in an attempt to avoid the draft, only to be called up after the 1917 season. Frazee hired International League President Ed Barrow as Red Sox manager. Barrow had spent the previous 30 years in a variety of baseball jobs, though he never played the game professionally. With the major leagues shorthanded because of the war, Barrow had many holes in the Red Sox lineup to fill.

Ruth also noticed these vacancies in the lineup. He was dissatisfied in the role of a pitcher who appeared every four or five days and wanted to play every day at another position. Barrow used Ruth at first base and in the outfield during the exhibition season, but he restricted him to pitching as the team moved toward Boston and the season opener. At the time, Ruth was possibly the best left-handed pitcher in baseball, and allowing him to play another position was an experiment that could have backfired.

Inexperienced as a manager, Barrow had player Harry Hooper advise him on baseball game strategy. Hooper urged his manager to allow Ruth to play another position when he was not pitching, arguing to Barrow, who had invested in the club, that the crowds were larger on days when Ruth played, as they were attracted by his hitting. In early May, Barrow gave in; Ruth promptly hit home runs in four consecutive games (one an exhibition), the last off of Walter Johnson. For the first time in his career (disregarding pinch-hitting appearances), Ruth was assigned a place in the batting order higher than ninth.

Although Barrow predicted that Ruth would beg to return to pitching the first time he experienced a batting slump, that did not occur. Barrow used Ruth primarily as an outfielder in the war-shortened 1918 season. Ruth hit .300, with 11 home runs, enough to secure him a share of the major league home run title with Tilly Walker of the Philadelphia Athletics. He was still occasionally used as a pitcher, and had a 13–7 record with a 2.22 ERA. On July 8, in the bottom of the ninth inning in a scoreless game, with a runner on first base Ruth hit a ball out of the ballpark to drive in the game-winning run; this was recorded as a triple, since the rules at that time considered the game over once the winning run scored. In 1968 the Special Baseball Records Committee unanimously ruled this, along with 36 other hits, a home run, but in part due to the perceived importance of preserving Ruth's home run total at 714, in 1969 the committee reversed this decision.

In 1918, the Red Sox won their third pennant in four years and faced the Chicago Cubs in the World Series, which began on September 5, the earliest date in history. The season had been shortened because the government had ruled that baseball players who were eligible for the military would have to be inducted or work in critical war industries, such as armaments plants. Ruth pitched and won Game One for the Red Sox, a 1–0 shutout. Before Game Four, Ruth injured his left hand in a fight but pitched anyway. He gave up seven hits and six walks, but was helped by outstanding fielding behind him and by his own batting efforts, as a fourth-inning triple by Ruth gave his team a 2–0 lead. The Cubs tied the game in the eighth inning, but the Red Sox scored to take a 3–2 lead again in the bottom of that inning. After Ruth gave up a hit and a walk to start the ninth inning, he was relieved on the mound by Joe Bush. To keep Ruth and his bat in the game, he was sent to play left field. Bush retired the side to give Ruth his second win of the Series, and the third and last World Series pitching victory of his career, against no defeats, in three pitching appearances. Ruth's effort gave his team a three-games-to-one lead, and two days later the Red Sox won their third Series in four years, four-games-to-two. Before allowing the Cubs to score in Game Four, Ruth pitched 29 2/3 consecutive scoreless innings, a World Series record that stood for more than 40 years until 1961, broken by Whitey Ford. Ruth was prouder of that record than he was of any of his batting feats.

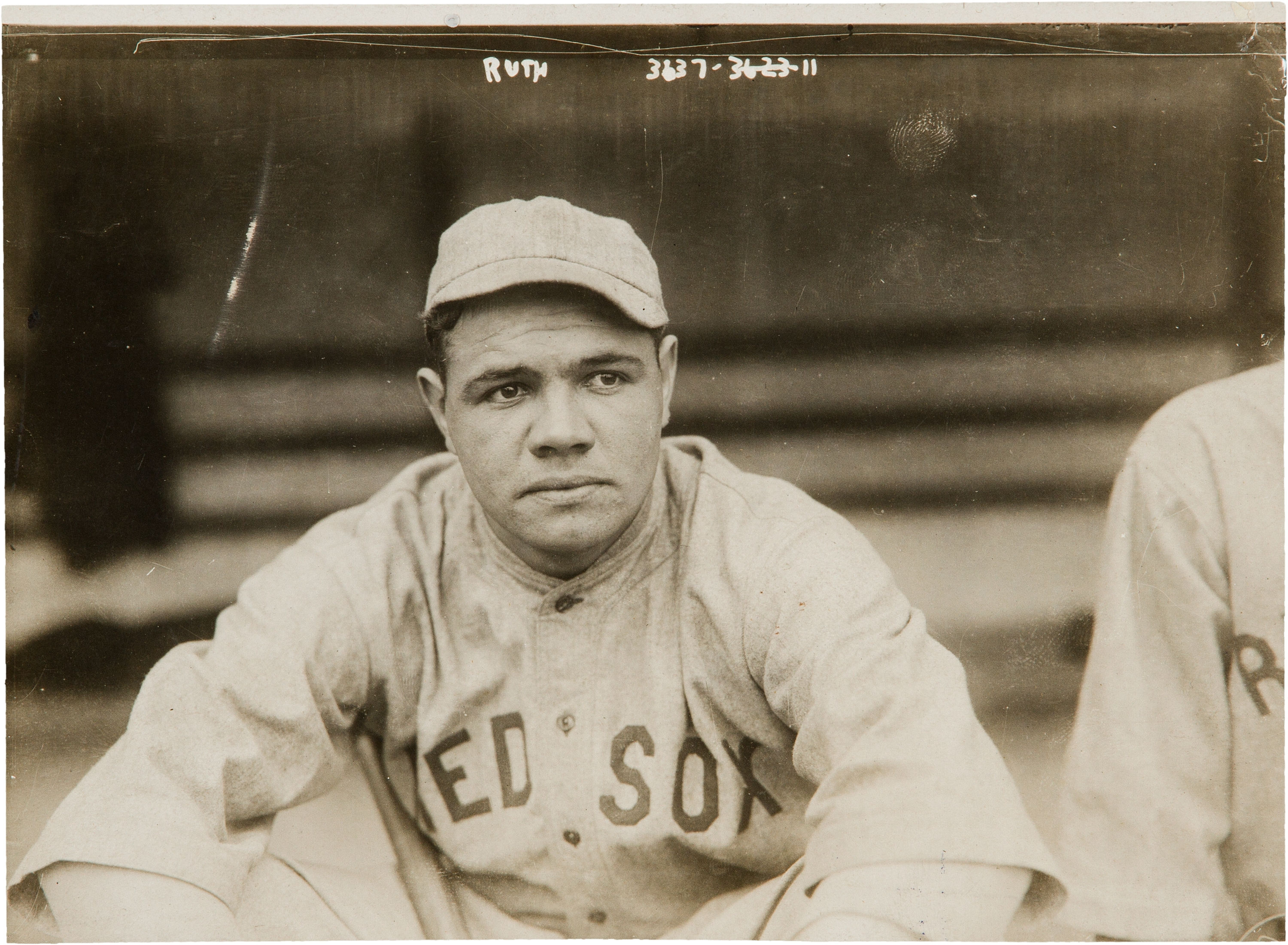
Ruth in 1919

With the World Series over, Ruth gained exemption from the war draft by accepting a nominal position with a Pennsylvania steel mill. Many industrial establishments took pride in their baseball teams and sought to hire major leaguers. The end of the war in November set Ruth free to play baseball without such contrivances.

During the 1919 season, Ruth was used as a pitcher in only 17 of his 130 games and compiled a 9–5 record. Barrow used him as a pitcher mostly in the early part of the season, when the Red Sox still had hopes of a second consecutive pennant. By late June, the Red Sox were clearly out of the race, and Barrow had no objection to Ruth concentrating on his hitting, if only because it drew people to the ballpark. Ruth had hit a home run against the Yankees on Opening Day, and another during a month-long batting slump that soon followed. Relieved of his pitching duties, Ruth began an unprecedented spell of slugging home runs, which gave him widespread public and press attention. Even his failures were seen as majestic—one sportswriter said, "When Ruth misses a swipe at the ball, the stands quiver."

Two home runs by Ruth on July 5, and one in each of two consecutive games a week later, raised his season total to 11, tying his career best from 1918. The first record to fall was the AL single-season mark of 16, set by Ralph "Socks" Seybold in 1902. Ruth matched that on July 29, then pulled ahead toward the major league record of 25, set by Buck Freeman in 1899. By the time Ruth reached this in early September, writers had discovered that Ned Williamson of the 1884 Chicago White Stockings had hit 27—though in a ballpark where the distance to right field was only 215 feet (66 m). On September 20, "Babe Ruth Day" at Fenway Park, Ruth won the game with a home run in the bottom of the ninth inning, tying Williamson. He broke the record four days later against the Yankees at the Polo Grounds, and hit one more against the Senators to finish with 29. The home run at Washington made Ruth the first major league player to hit a home run at all eight ballparks in his league. In spite of Ruth's hitting heroics, the Red Sox finished sixth, 20 1/2 games behind the league champion White Sox. (Note: The American League had eight teams from 1901 to 1960.) In his six seasons with Boston, he won 89 games and recorded a 2.19 ERA. He had a four-year stretch where he was second in the AL in wins and ERA behind Walter Johnson, and Ruth had a winning record against Johnson in head-to-head matchups.

=== Sale to New York ===
As an out-of-towner from New York City, Frazee had been regarded with suspicion by Boston's sportswriters and baseball fans when he bought the team. He won them over with success on the field and a willingness to build the Red Sox by purchasing or trading for players. He offered the Senators $60,000 for Walter Johnson, but Washington owner Clark Griffith was unwilling. Even so, Frazee was successful in bringing other players to Boston, especially as replacements for players in the military. This willingness to spend for players helped the Red Sox secure the 1918 title. The 1919 season saw record-breaking attendance, and Ruth's home runs for Boston made him a national sensation. In March 1919 Ruth was reported as having accepted a three-year contract for a total of $27,000, after protracted negotiations. Nevertheless, on December 26, 1919, Frazee sold Ruth's contract to the New York Yankees.

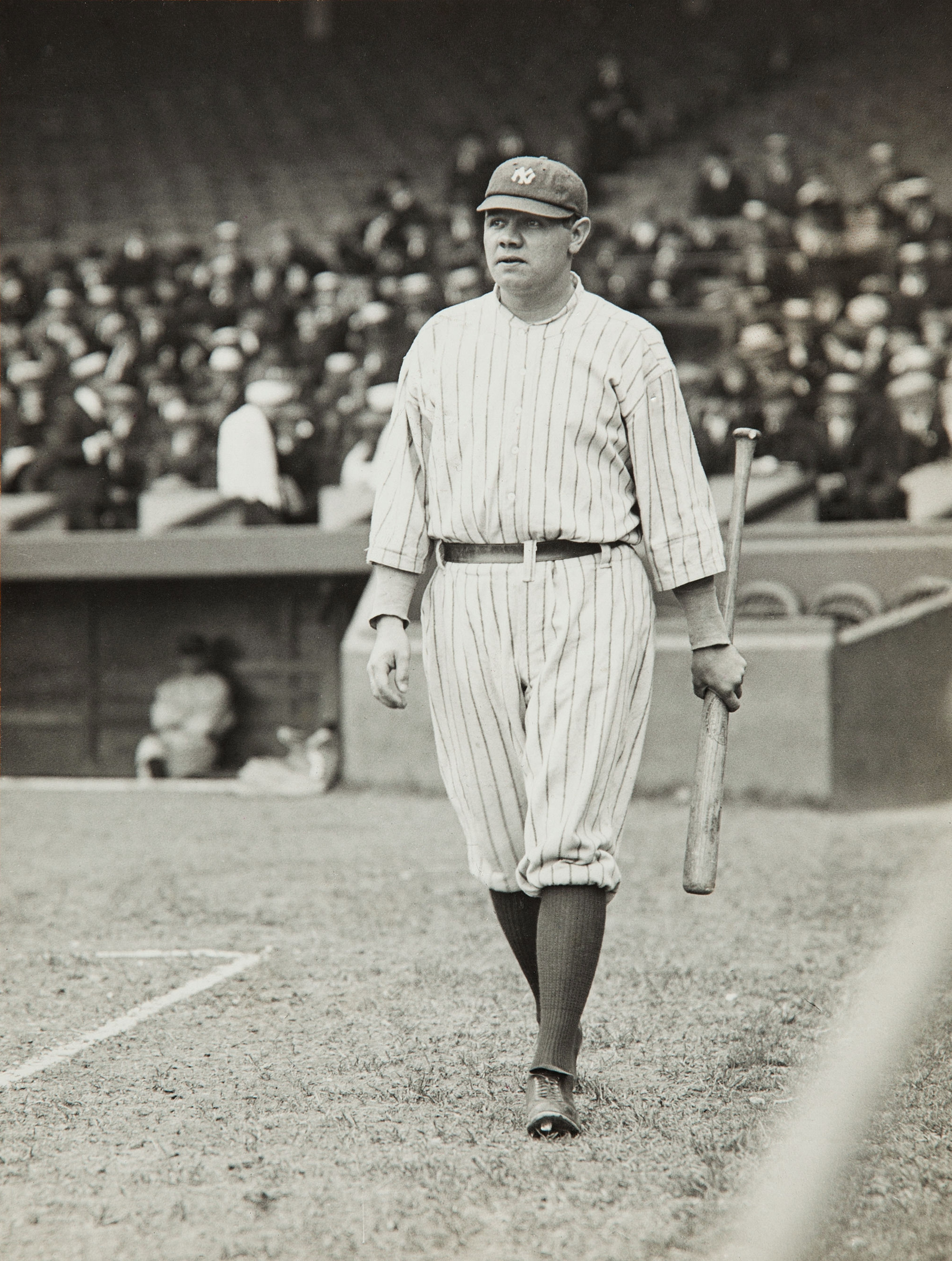
Ruth in his first year with the New York Yankees, 1920

Not all the circumstances concerning the sale are known, but brewer and former congressman Jacob Ruppert, the New York team's principal owner, reportedly asked Yankee manager Miller Huggins what the team needed to be successful. "Get Ruth from Boston", Huggins supposedly replied, noting that Frazee was perennially in need of money to finance his theatrical productions. An often-told story is that Frazee needed money, and sold Ruth to finance the musical No, No, Nanette; that play did not open until 1925, by which time Frazee had sold the Red Sox, but was based on a Frazee-produced play, My Lady Friends, which opened in 1919. There were also other financial pressures on Frazee, despite his team's success. Ruth, fully aware of baseball's popularity and his role in it, wanted to renegotiate his contract, signed before the 1919 season for $10,000 per year through 1921. He demanded that his salary be doubled, or he would sit out the season and cash in on his popularity through other ventures. Ruth's salary demands were causing other players to ask for more money. Additionally, Frazee still owed Lannin as much as $125,000 from the purchase of the club.

Although Ruppert and his co-owner, Colonel Tillinghast Huston, were both wealthy, and had aggressively purchased and traded for players in 1918 and 1919 to build a winning team, Ruppert faced losses in his brewing interests as Prohibition was implemented, and if their team left the Polo Grounds, where the Yankees were the tenants of the New York Giants, building a stadium in New York would be expensive. Nevertheless, when Frazee, who moved in the same social circles as Huston, hinted to the colonel that Ruth was available for the right price, the Yankees owners quickly pursued the purchase.

Frazee sold the rights to Babe Ruth for $100,000, the largest sum ever paid for a baseball player. The deal also involved a $350,000 loan from Ruppert to Frazee, secured by a mortgage on Fenway Park. Once it was agreed, Frazee informed Barrow, who, stunned, told the owner that he was getting the worse end of the bargain. Cynics have suggested that Barrow may have played a larger role in the Ruth sale, as less than a year after, he became the Yankee general manager, and in the following years made a number of purchases of Red Sox players from Frazee. The $100,000 price included $25,000 in cash, and notes for the same amount due November 1 in 1920, 1921, and 1922; Ruppert and Huston assisted Frazee in selling the notes to banks for immediate cash.

The transaction was contingent on Ruth signing a new contract, which was quickly accomplished—Ruth agreed to fulfill the remaining two years on his contract, but was given a $20,000 bonus, payable over two seasons. The deal was announced on January 6, 1920. Reaction in Boston was mixed: some fans were embittered at the loss of Ruth; others conceded that Ruth had become difficult to deal with. The New York Times suggested that "The short right field wall at the Polo Grounds should prove an easy target for Ruth next season and, playing seventy-seven games at home, it would not be surprising if Ruth surpassed his home run record of twenty-nine circuit clouts next Summer." According to Reisler, "The Yankees had pulled off the sports steal of the century."

According to Marty Appel in his history of the Yankees, the transaction, "changed the fortunes of two high-profile franchises for decades". The Red Sox, winners of five of the first 16 World Series, those played between 1903 and 1919, (Note: There was no World Series in 1904 or 1994.) would not win another pennant until 1946, or another World Series until 2004, a drought attributed in baseball superstition to Frazee's sale of Ruth and sometimes dubbed the "Curse of the Bambino". Conversely, the Yankees had not won the AL championship prior to their acquisition of Ruth. They won seven AL pennants and four World Series with him, and lead baseball with 41 pennants and 27 World Series titles in their history.

=== New York Yankees (1920–1934) ===
==== Initial success (1920–1923) ====
When Ruth signed with the Yankees, his transition from a pitcher to a power-hitting outfielder was complete. His 15-season Yankee career consisted of over 2,000 games, and Ruth broke many batting records while making only five widely scattered appearances on the mound, winning all of them.

At the end of April 1920, the Yankees were 4–7, with the Red Sox leading the league with a 10–2 mark. Ruth had done little, having injured himself swinging the bat. Both situations began to change on May 1, when Ruth hit a tape measure home run that sent the ball completely out of the Polo Grounds, a feat believed to have been previously accomplished only by Shoeless Joe Jackson. The Yankees won, 6–0, taking three out of four from the Red Sox. Ruth hit his second home run on May 2, and by the end of the month had set a major league record for home runs in a month with 11, and promptly broke it with 13 in June. Fans responded with record attendance figures. On May 16, Ruth and the Yankees drew 38,600 to the Polo Grounds, a record for the ballpark, and 15,000 fans were turned away. Large crowds jammed stadiums to see Ruth play when the Yankees were on the road.

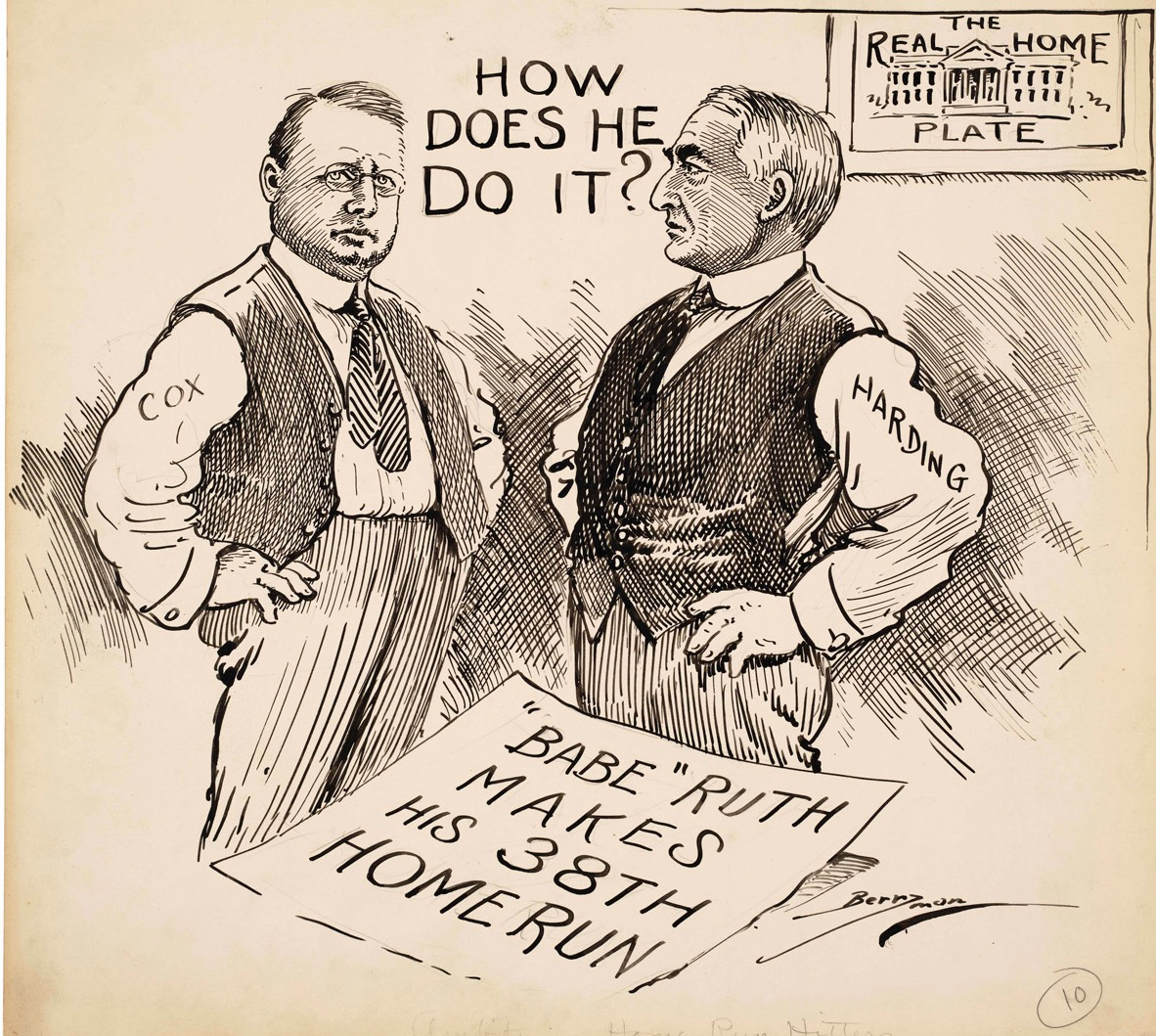
"How Does He Do It?" In this Clifford Berryman cartoon, presidential candidates Warren G. Harding and James M. Cox wonder at Ruth's record home run pace.

The home runs kept on coming. Ruth tied his own record of 29 on July 15 and broke it with home runs in both games of a doubleheader four days later. By the end of July, he had 37, but his pace slackened somewhat after that. Nevertheless, on September 4, he both tied and broke the organized baseball record for home runs in a season, snapping Perry Werden's 1895 mark of 44 in the minor Western League. The Yankees played well as a team, battling for the league lead early in the summer, but slumped in August in the AL pennant battle with Chicago and Cleveland. The pennant and the World Series were won by Cleveland, who surged ahead after the Black Sox Scandal broke on September 28 and led to the suspension of many of Chicago's top players, including Shoeless Joe Jackson. The Yankees finished third, but drew 1.2 million fans to the Polo Grounds, the first time a team had drawn a seven-figure attendance. The rest of the league sold 600,000 more tickets, many fans there to see Ruth, who led the league with 54 home runs, 158 runs, and 137 runs batted in (RBIs).

In 1920 and afterwards, Ruth was aided in his power hitting by the fact that A.J. Reach Company—the maker of baseballs used in the major leagues—was using a more efficient machine to wind the yarn found within the baseball. The new baseballs went into play in 1920 and ushered the start of the live-ball era; the number of home runs across the major leagues increased by 184 over the previous year. Baseball statistician Bill James pointed out that while Ruth was likely aided by the change in the baseball, there were other factors at work, including the gradual abolition of the spitball (accelerated after the death of Ray Chapman, struck by a pitched ball thrown by Mays in August 1920) and the more frequent use of new baseballs (also a response to Chapman's death). Nevertheless, James theorized that Ruth's 1920 explosion might have happened in 1919, had a full season of 154 games been played rather than 140, had Ruth refrained from pitching 133 innings that season, and if he were playing at any other home field but Fenway Park, where he hit only 9 of 29 home runs.

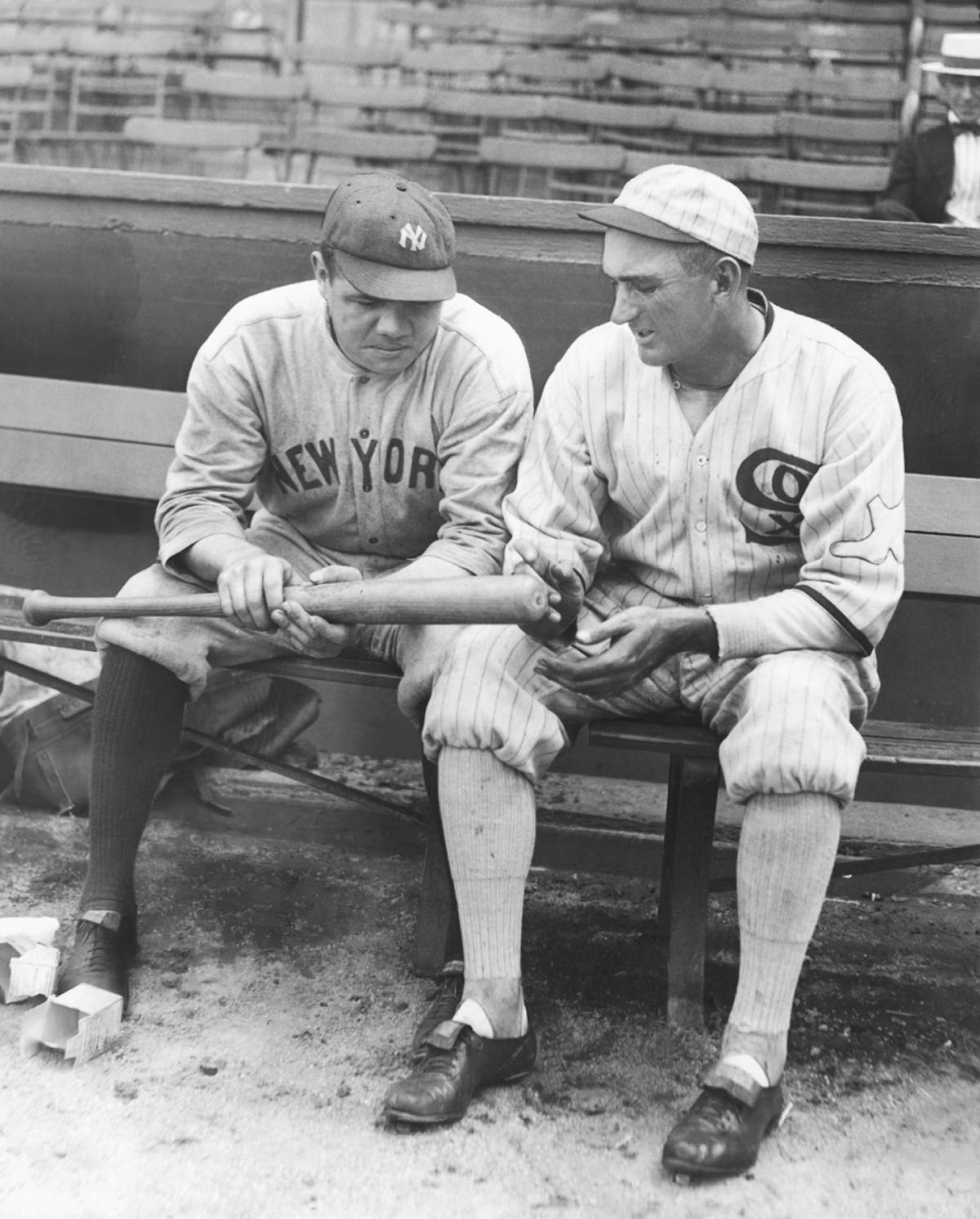
Ruth and Shoeless Joe Jackson looking at one of Ruth's home run bats, 1920

Yankees business manager Harry Sparrow had died early in the 1920 season. Ruppert and Huston hired Barrow to replace him. The two men quickly made a deal with Frazee for New York to acquire some of the players who would be mainstays of the early Yankee pennant-winning teams, including catcher Wally Schang and pitcher Waite Hoyt. The 21-year-old Hoyt became close to Ruth:

The outrageous life fascinated Hoyt, the don't-give-a-shit freedom of it, the nonstop, pell-mell charge into excess. How did a man drink so much and never get drunk? ... The puzzle of Babe Ruth never was dull, no matter how many times Hoyt picked up the pieces and stared at them. After games he would follow the crowd to the Babe's suite. No matter what the town, the beer would be iced and the bottles would fill the bathtub.

In the offseason, Ruth spent some time in Havana, Cuba, where he was said to have lost $35,000 (equivalent to $630,000 in 2025) betting on horse races.

Ruth hit home runs early and often in the 1921 season, during which he broke Roger Connor's mark for home runs in a career, 138. Each of the almost 600 home runs Ruth hit in his career after that extended his own record. After a slow start, the Yankees were soon locked in a tight pennant race with Cleveland, winners of the 1920 World Series. On September 15, Ruth hit his 55th home run, breaking his year-old single-season record. In late September, the Yankees visited Cleveland and won three out of four games, giving them the upper hand in the race, and clinched their first pennant a few days later. Ruth finished the regular season with 59 home runs, batting .378 and with a slugging percentage of .846. Ruth's 177 runs scored, 119 extra-base hits, and 457 total bases set modern-era records that still stand as of 2024.

The Yankees had high expectations when they met the New York Giants in the 1921 World Series, every game of which was played in the Polo Grounds. The Yankees won the first two games with Ruth in the lineup. However, Ruth badly scraped his elbow during Game 2 when he slid into third base (he had walked and stolen both second and third bases). After the game, he was told by the team physician not to play the rest of the series. Despite this advice, he did play in the next three games, and pinch-hit in Game Eight of the best-of-nine series, but the Yankees lost, five games to three. Ruth hit .316, drove in five runs and hit his first World Series home run.

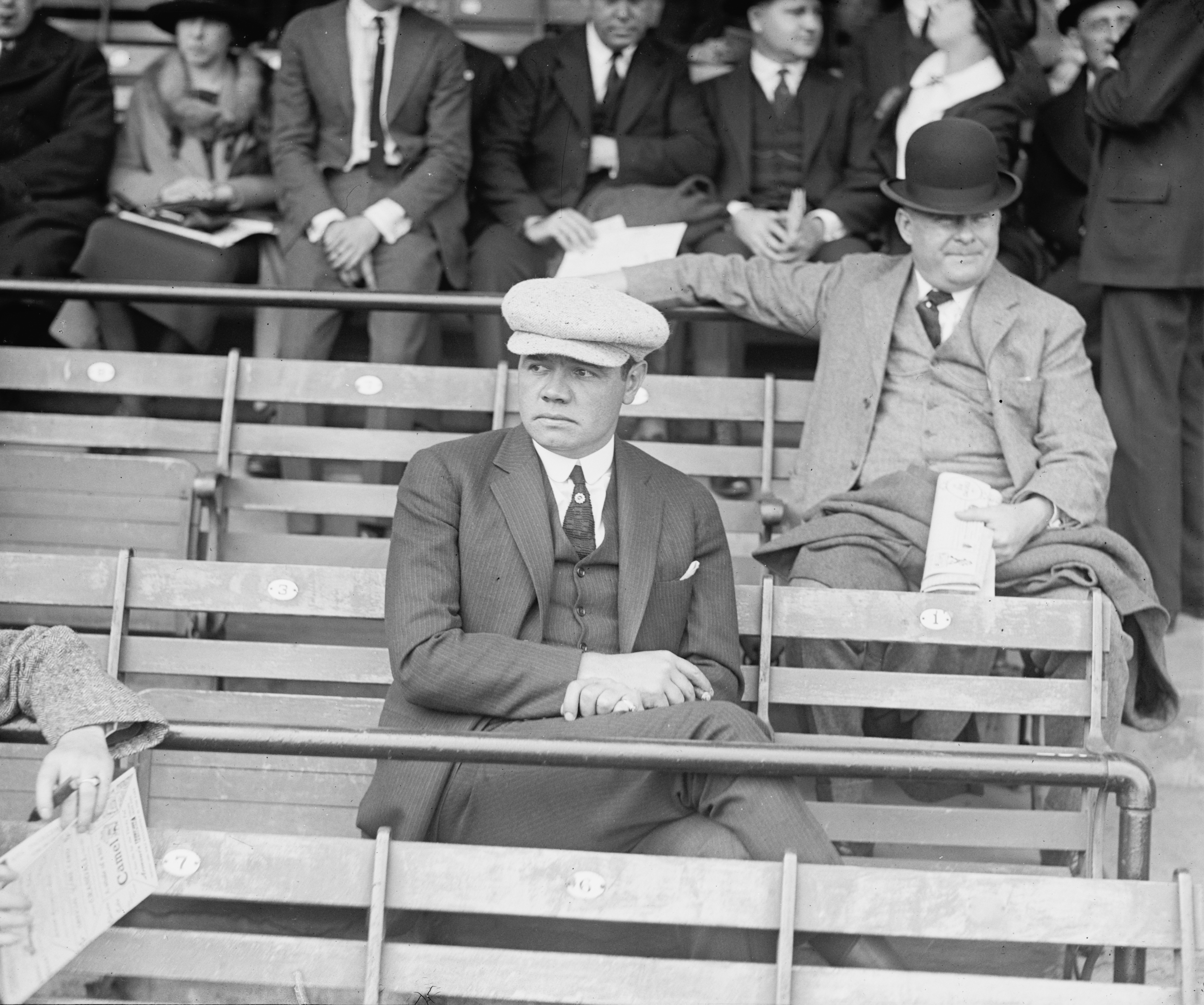
Ruth in the stands on Opening Day, April 12, 1922, at Griffith Stadium in Washington, D.C.

After the Series, Ruth and teammates Bob Meusel and Bill Piercy participated in a barnstorming tour in the Northeast. A rule then in force prohibited World Series participants from playing in exhibition games during the offseason, the purpose being to prevent Series participants from replicating the Series and undermining its value. Baseball Commissioner Kenesaw Mountain Landis suspended the trio until May 20, 1922, and fined them their 1921 World Series checks. In August 1922, the rule was changed to allow limited barnstorming for World Series participants, with Landis's permission required.

On March 4, 1922, Ruth signed a new contract for three years at $52,000 a year (equivalent to $1,000,000 in 2025). This was more than two times the largest sum ever paid to a ballplayer up to that point and it represented 40% of the team's player payroll.

Despite his suspension, Ruth was named the Yankees' new on-field captain prior to the 1922 season. During the suspension, he worked out with the team in the morning and played exhibition games with the Yankees on their off days. He and Meusel returned on May 20 to a sellout crowd at the Polo Grounds, but Ruth batted 0-for-4 and was booed. On May 25, he was thrown out of the game for throwing dust in umpire George Hildebrand's face, then climbed into the stands to confront a heckler. Ban Johnson ordered him fined, suspended, and stripped of position as team captain. In his shortened season, Ruth appeared in 110 games, batted .315, with 35 home runs, and drove in 99 runs, but the 1922 season was a disappointment in comparison to his two previous dominating years. Despite Ruth's off-year, the Yankees managed to win the pennant and faced the New York Giants in the World Series for the second consecutive year. In the Series, Giants manager John McGraw instructed his pitchers to throw him nothing but curveballs, and Ruth never adjusted. Ruth had just two hits in 17 at bats, and the Yankees lost to the Giants for the second straight year, by 4–0 (with one tie game). Sportswriter Joe Vila called him, "an exploded phenomenon".

After the season, Ruth was a guest at an Elks Club banquet, set up by Ruth's agent with Yankee team support. There, each speaker, concluding with future New York mayor Jimmy Walker, censured him for his poor behavior. An emotional Ruth promised reform, and, to the surprise of many, followed through. When he reported to spring training, he was in his best shape as a Yankee, weighing only 210 pounds (95 kg).

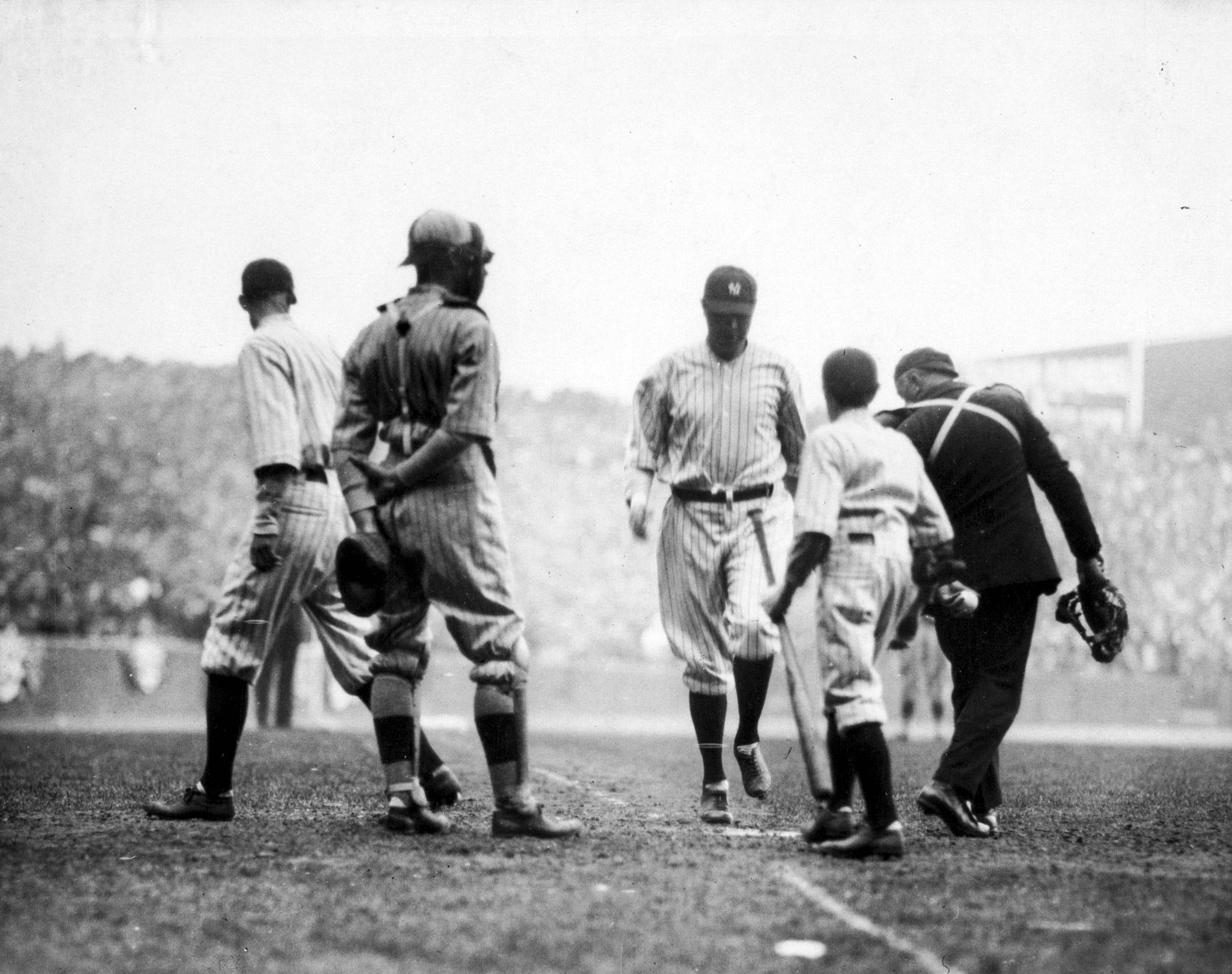
Babe Ruth hits the first home run at Yankee Stadium, April 18, 1923

The Yankees' status as tenants of the Giants at the Polo Grounds had become increasingly uneasy, and in 1922, Giants owner Charles Stoneham said the Yankees' lease, expiring after that season, would not be renewed. Ruppert and Huston had long contemplated a new stadium, and had taken an option on property at 161st Street and River Avenue in the Bronx. Yankee Stadium was completed in time for the home opener on April 18, 1923, at which Ruth hit the first home run in what was quickly dubbed "the House that Ruth Built". The ballpark was designed with Ruth in mind: although the venue's left-field fence was further from home plate than at the Polo Grounds, Yankee Stadium's right-field fence was closer, making home runs easier to hit for left-handed batters. To spare Ruth's eyes, right field—his defensive position—was not pointed into the afternoon sun, as was traditional; left fielder Meusel soon developed headaches from squinting toward home plate.

During the 1923 season, the Yankees were never seriously challenged and won the AL pennant by 17 games. Ruth finished the season with a career-high .393 batting average and 41 home runs, which tied Cy Williams for the most in the major-leagues that year. Ruth hit a career-high 45 doubles in 1923, and he reached base 379 times, then a major league record. For the third straight year, the Yankees faced the Giants in the World Series, which Ruth dominated. He batted .368, walked eight times, scored eight runs, hit three home runs and slugged 1.000 during the series, as the Yankees christened their new stadium with their first World Series championship, four games to two. Following the season, Ruth was unanimously voted the American League Most Valuable Player, joining Ty Cobb as the only other player to have received every possible vote.

==== Batting title and "bellyache" (1924–1925) ====
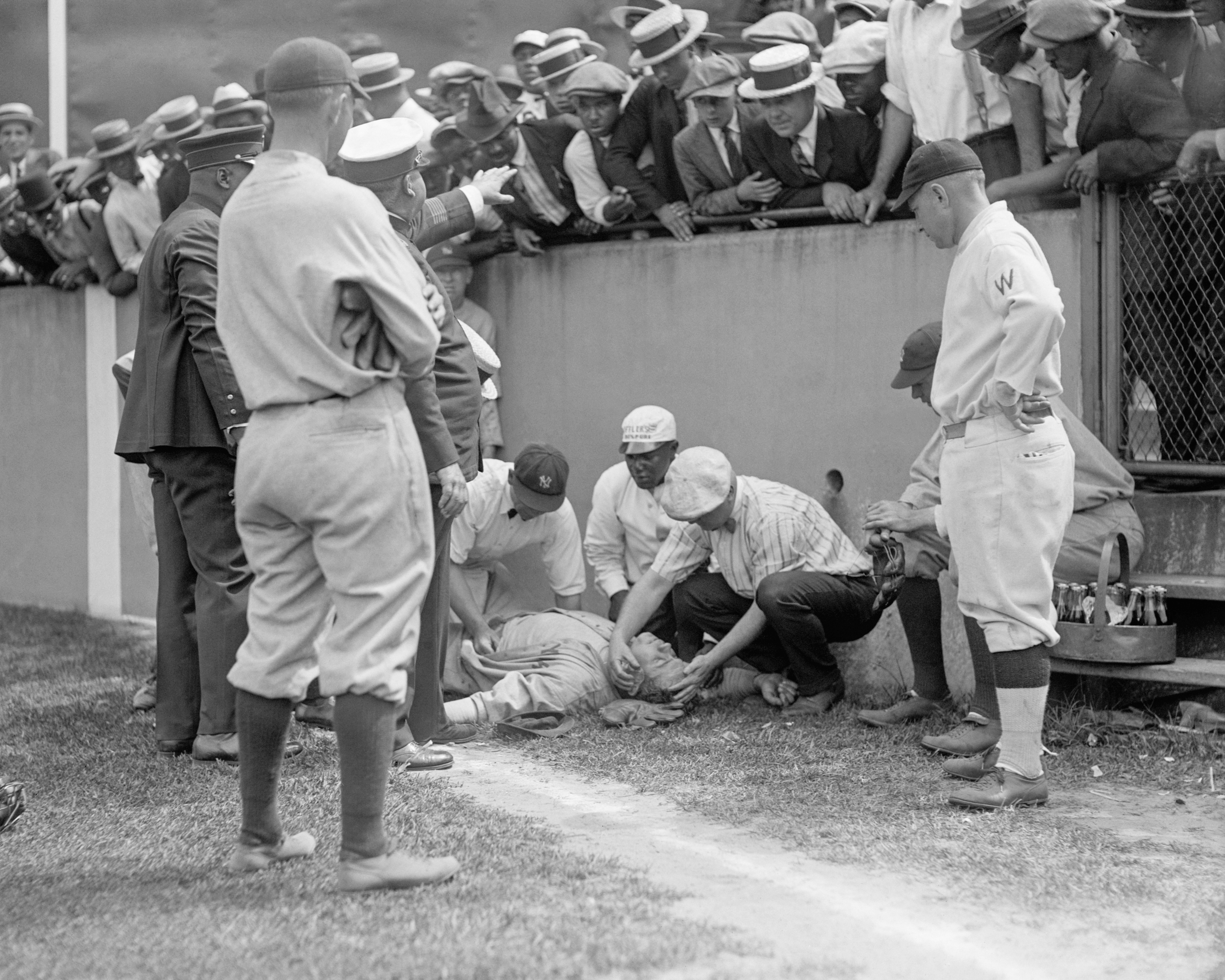
Ruth after losing consciousness from running into the wall at Griffith Stadium during a game against the Washington Senators on July 5, 1924. Ruth insisted on staying in the game despite evident pain and a bruised pelvic bone. He hit a double in his next at-bat. Note the absence of a warning track along the outfield wall.

In 1924, the Yankees were favored to become the first team to win four consecutive pennants. Plagued by injuries, they found themselves in a battle with the Senators. Although the Yankees won 18 of 22 at one point in September, the Senators beat out the Yankees by two games. Ruth hit .378, winning his only AL batting title, with a league-leading 46 home runs.

Ruth did not look like an athlete; he was described as "toothpicks attached to a piano", with a big upper body but thin wrists and legs. Ruth had kept up his efforts to stay in shape in 1923 and 1924, but by early 1925 weighed nearly 260 pounds (120 kg). His annual visit to Hot Springs, Arkansas, where he exercised and took saunas early in the year, did him no good as he spent much of the time carousing in the resort town. He became ill while there, and relapsed during spring training. Ruth collapsed in Asheville, North Carolina, as the team journeyed north. He was put on a train for New York, where he was briefly hospitalized. A rumor circulated that he had died, prompting British newspapers to print a premature obituary. In New York, Ruth collapsed again and was found unconscious in his hotel bathroom. He was taken to a hospital where he had multiple convulsions. After sportswriter W. O. McGeehan wrote that Ruth's illness was due to binging on hot dogs and soda pop before a game, it became known as "the bellyache heard 'round the world". However, the exact cause of his ailment has never been confirmed and remains a mystery. Glenn Stout, in his history of the Yankees, writes that the Ruth legend is "still one of the most sheltered in sports"; he suggests that alcohol was at the root of Ruth's illness, pointing to the fact that Ruth remained six weeks at St. Vincent's Hospital but was allowed to leave, under supervision, for workouts with the team for part of that time. He concludes that the hospitalization was behavior-related. Playing just 98 games, Ruth had his worst season as a Yankee; he finished with a .290 average and 25 home runs. The Yankees finished next to last in the AL with a 69–85 record, their last season with a losing record until 1965.

==== Murderers' Row (1926–1928) ====
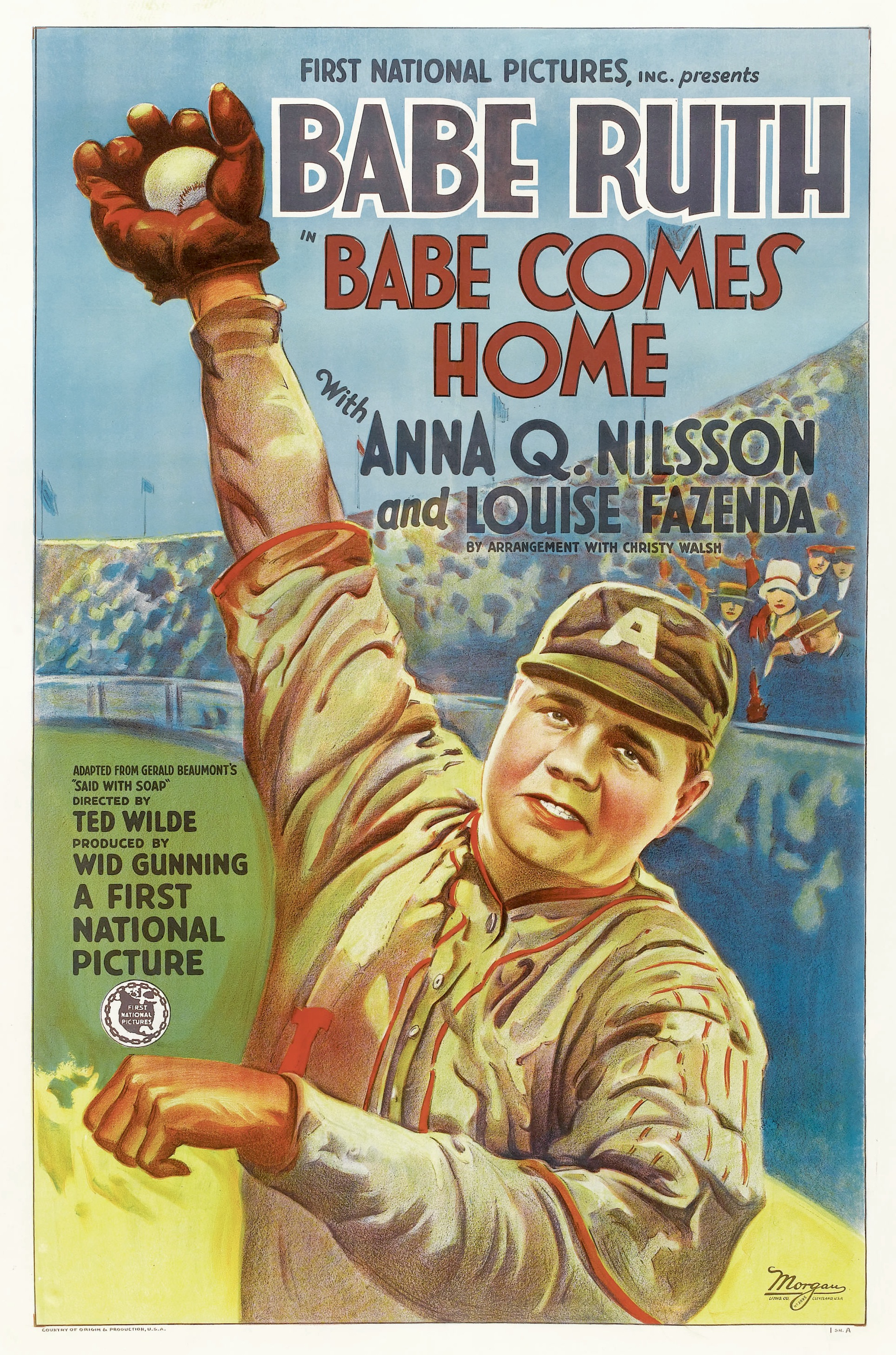
Ruth took time off in 1927 to star with Anna Q. Nilsson in this First National silent production Babe Comes Home. This film is now lost.

Ruth spent part of the offseason of 1925–26 working out at Artie McGovern's gym, where he got back into shape. Barrow and Huggins had rebuilt the team and surrounded the veteran core with good young players like Tony Lazzeri and Lou Gehrig, but the Yankees were not expected to win the pennant.

Ruth returned to his normal production during 1926, when he batted .372 with 47 home runs and 146 RBIs. The Yankees built a 10-game lead by mid-June and coasted to win the pennant by three games. The St. Louis Cardinals had won the National League with the lowest winning percentage for a pennant winner to that point (.578) and the Yankees were expected to win the World Series easily. Although the Yankees won the opener in New York, St. Louis took Games Two and Three. In Game Four, Ruth hit three home runs—the first time this had been done in a World Series game—to lead the Yankees to victory. In the fifth game, Ruth caught a ball as he crashed into the fence. The play was described by baseball writers as a defensive gem. New York took that game, but Grover Cleveland Alexander won Game Six for St. Louis to tie the Series at three games each, then got very drunk. He was nevertheless inserted into Game Seven in the seventh inning and shut down the Yankees to win the game, 3–2, and win the Series. Ruth had hit his fourth home run of the Series earlier in the game and was the only Yankee to reach base off Alexander; he walked in the ninth inning before being thrown out to end the game when he attempted to steal second base. Although Ruth's attempt to steal second is often deemed a baserunning blunder, Creamer pointed out that the Yankees' chances of tying the game would have been greatly improved with a runner in scoring position.

The 1926 World Series was also known for Ruth's promise to Johnny Sylvester, a hospitalized 11-year-old boy who had been injured by a kick from a horse. A friend of Sylvester's father gave the boy two autographed baseballs signed by the Yankees and Cardinals. On the Yankees ball, Ruth, who did not know Sylvester, wrote, "I'll knock a homer for you on Wednesday." Ruth went on to hit three home runs in Game 4 of the World Series that Wednesday. After the Series, Ruth visited the boy in the hospital. When the matter became public, the press greatly inflated the story, and by some accounts, Ruth allegedly saved the boy's life by visiting him, emotionally promising to hit a home run, and doing so. Ruth's 1926 salary of $52,000 was far more than any other baseball player, but he made at least twice as much in other income, including $100,000 from 12 weeks of vaudeville.

The 1927 New York Yankees team is considered one of the greatest squads to ever take the field. Known as Murderers' Row because of the power of its lineup, the team clinched first place on Labor Day, won a then-AL-record 110 games and took the AL pennant by 19 games. There was no suspense in the pennant race, and the nation turned its attention to Ruth's pursuit of his own single-season home run record of 59 round trippers. Ruth was not alone in this chase. Teammate Lou Gehrig proved to be a slugger who was capable of challenging Ruth for his home run crown; he tied Ruth with 24 home runs late in June. Through July and August, the dynamic duo was never separated by more than two home runs. Gehrig took the lead, 45–44, in the first game of a doubleheader at Fenway Park early in September; Ruth responded with two blasts of his own to take the lead, as it proved permanently—Gehrig finished with 47. Even so, as of September 6, Ruth was still several games off his 1921 pace, and going into the final series against the Senators, had only 57. He hit two in the first game of the series, including one off of Paul Hopkins, facing his first major league batter, to tie the record. The following day, September 30, he broke it with his 60th homer, in the eighth inning off Tom Zachary to break a 2–2 tie. "Sixty! Let's see some son of a bitch try to top that one", Ruth exulted after the game. In addition to his career-high 60 home runs, Ruth batted .356, drove in 164 runs and slugged .772. In the 1927 World Series, the Yankees swept the Pittsburgh Pirates in four games; the National Leaguers were disheartened after watching the Yankees take batting practice before Game One, with ball after ball leaving Forbes Field. According to Appel, "The 1927 New York Yankees. Even today, the words inspire awe ... all baseball success is measured against the '27 team."

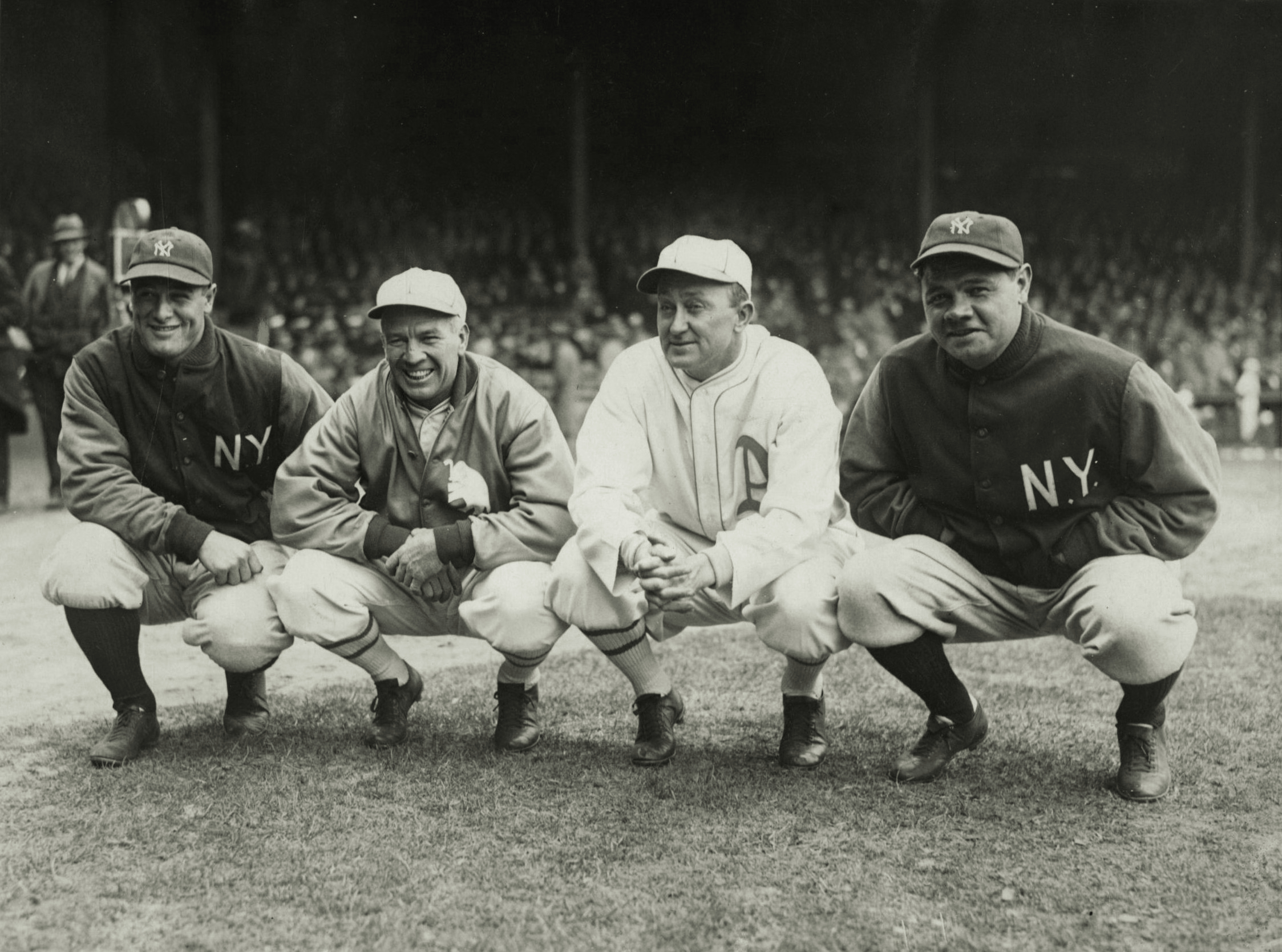
Lou Gehrig, Tris Speaker, Ty Cobb, and Ruth, 1928

The following season started off well for the Yankees, who led the league in the early going. But the Yankees were plagued by injuries, erratic pitching and inconsistent play. The Philadelphia Athletics, rebuilding after some lean years, erased the Yankees' big lead and even took over first place briefly in early September. The Yankees, however, regained first place when they beat the Athletics three out of four games in a pivotal series at Yankee Stadium later that month, and clinched the pennant in the final weekend of the season. Ruth's play in 1928 mirrored his team's performance. He got off to a hot start and on August 1, he had 42 home runs. This put him ahead of his 60 home run pace from the previous season. He then slumped for the latter part of the season, and he hit just twelve home runs in the last two months. Ruth's batting average also fell to .323, well below his career average. Nevertheless, he ended the season with 54 home runs. The Yankees swept the favored Cardinals in four games in the World Series, with Ruth batting .625 and hitting three home runs in Game Four, including one off Alexander.

==== "Called shot" and final Yankee years (1929–1934) ====
Before the 1929 season, Ruppert (who had bought out Huston in 1923) announced that the Yankees would wear uniform numbers to allow fans at cavernous Yankee Stadium to easily identify the players. The Cardinals and Indians had each experimented with uniform numbers; the Yankees were the first to use them on both home and away uniforms. Ruth batted third and was given number 3. According to a long-standing baseball legend, the Yankees adopted their now-iconic pinstriped uniforms in hopes of making Ruth look slimmer. In truth, though, they had been wearing pinstripes since 1915.

Although the Yankees started well, the Athletics soon proved they were the better team in 1929, splitting two series with the Yankees in the first month of the season, then taking advantage of a Yankee losing streak in mid-May to gain first place. Although Ruth performed well, the Yankees were not able to catch the Athletics—Connie Mack had built another great team. Tragedy struck the Yankees late in the year when manager Huggins died at 51 of erysipelas, a bacterial skin infection, on September 25, only ten days after he had last directed the team. Despite their past differences, Ruth praised Huggins and described him as a "great guy". The Yankees finished second, 18 games behind the Athletics. Ruth hit .345 during the season, with 46 home runs and 154 RBIs.

A few seasons ago I used a 54 ounce bat, long and with the weight well at the end. Now I'm using a 46 ounce club—and each season when I have a new set of bats made, I have an additional ounce taken off.

— Ruth in Babe Ruth's Own Book of Baseball (1928), p. 171

On October 17, the Yankees hired Bob Shawkey as manager; he was their fourth choice. Ruth had politicked for the job of player-manager, but Ruppert and Barrow never seriously considered him for the position. Stout deemed this the first hint Ruth would have no future with the Yankees once he retired as a player. Shawkey, a former Yankees player and teammate of Ruth, would prove unable to command Ruth's respect.

On January 7, 1930, salary negotiations between the Yankees and Ruth quickly broke down. Having just concluded a three-year contract at an annual salary of $70,000, Ruth promptly rejected both the Yankees' initial proposal of $70,000 for one year and their 'final' offer of two years at seventy-five—the latter figure equaling the annual salary of then US President Herbert Hoover; instead, Ruth demanded at least $85,000 and three years. When asked why he thought he was "worth more than the President of the United States," Ruth responded: "Say, if I hadn't been sick last summer, I'd have broken hell out of that home run record! Besides, the President gets a four-year contract. I'm only asking for three." Exactly two months later, a compromise was reached, with Ruth settling for two years at an unprecedented $80,000 per year. Ruth's salary was more than 2.4 times greater than the next-highest salary that season, a record margin as of 2025.

In 1930, Ruth hit .359 with 49 home runs (his best in his years after 1928) and 153 RBIs, and pitched his first game in nine years, a complete game victory. Nevertheless, the Athletics won their second consecutive pennant and World Series, as the Yankees finished in third place, sixteen games back. At the end of the season, Shawkey was fired and replaced with Cubs manager Joe McCarthy, though Ruth again unsuccessfully sought the job.

McCarthy was a disciplinarian, but chose not to interfere with Ruth, who did not seek conflict with the manager. The team improved in 1931, but was no match for the Athletics, who won 107 games, 13 1/2 games in front of the Yankees. Ruth, for his part, hit .373, with 46 home runs and 163 RBIs. He had 31 doubles, his most since 1924. In the 1932 season, the Yankees went 107–47 and won the pennant. Ruth's effectiveness had decreased somewhat, but he still hit .341 with 41 home runs and 137 RBIs. Nevertheless, he was sidelined twice because of injuries during the season.

The Yankees faced the Cubs, McCarthy's former team, in the 1932 World Series. There was bad blood between the two teams as the Yankees resented the Cubs only awarding half a World Series share to Mark Koenig, a former Yankee. The games at Yankee Stadium had not been sellouts; both were won by the home team, with Ruth collecting two singles, but scoring four runs as he was walked four times by the Cubs pitchers. In Chicago, Ruth was resentful at the hostile crowds that met the Yankees' train and jeered them at the hotel. The crowd for Game Three included New York Governor Franklin D. Roosevelt, the Democratic candidate for president, who sat with Chicago Mayor Anton Cermak. Many in the crowd threw lemons at Ruth, a sign of derision, and others (as well as the Cubs themselves) shouted abuse at Ruth and other Yankees. They were briefly silenced when Ruth hit a three-run home run off Charlie Root in the first inning, but soon revived, and the Cubs tied the score at 4–4 in the fourth inning, partly due to Ruth's fielding error in the outfield. When Ruth came to the plate in the top of the fifth, the Chicago crowd and players, led by pitcher Guy Bush, were screaming insults at Ruth. With the count at two balls and one strike, Ruth gestured, possibly in the direction of center field, and after the next pitch (a strike), may have pointed there with one hand. Ruth hit the fifth pitch over the center field fence; estimates were that it traveled nearly 500 feet (150 m). Whether or not Ruth intended to indicate where he planned to (and did) hit the ball (Charlie Devens, who, in 1999, was interviewed as Ruth's surviving teammate in that game, did not think so), the incident has gone down in legend as Babe Ruth's called shot. The Yankees won Game Three, and the following day clinched the Series with another victory. During that game, Bush hit Ruth on the arm with a pitch, causing words to be exchanged and provoking a game-winning Yankee rally.

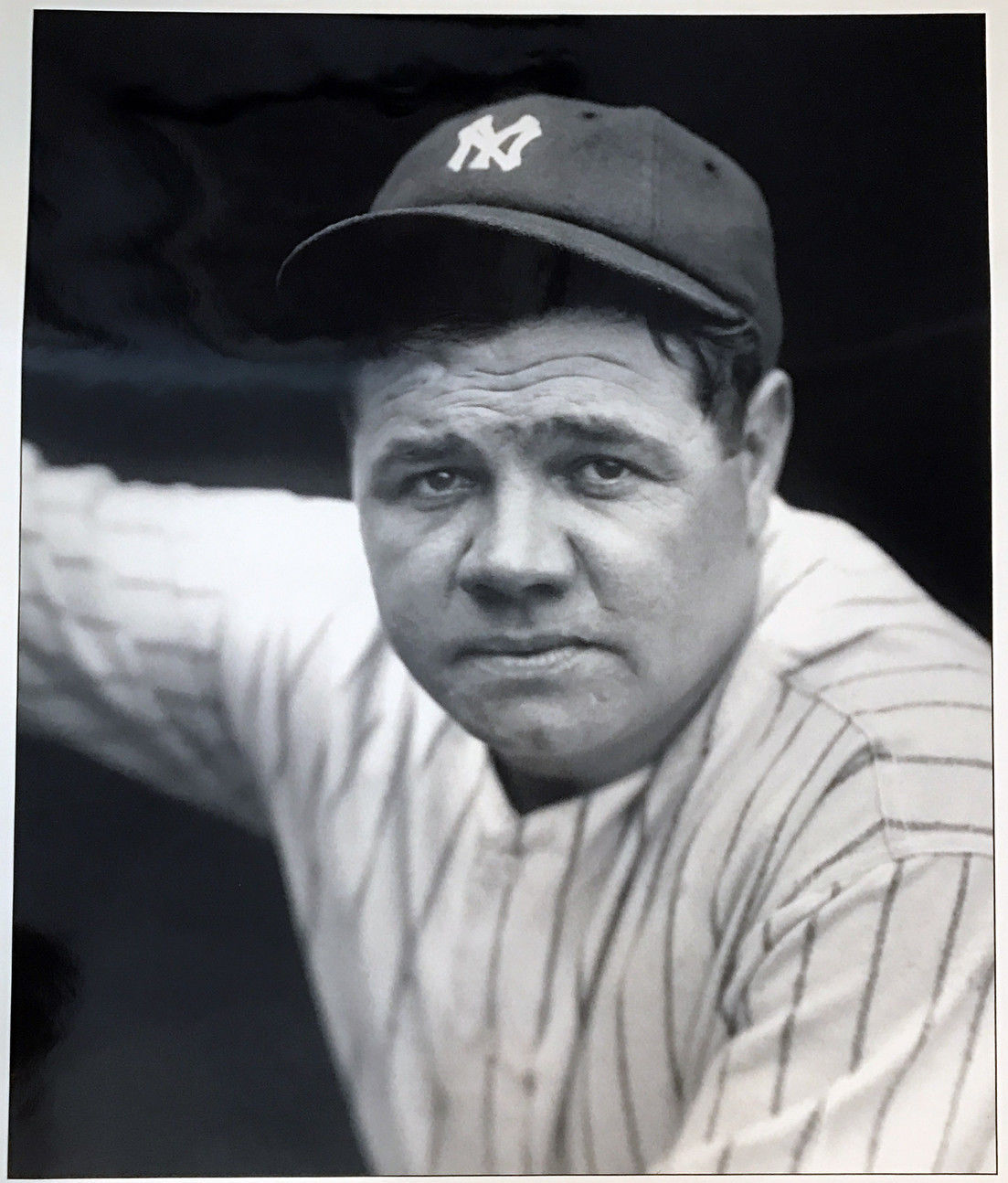
Ruth in 1933

Ruth remained productive in 1933. He batted .301, with 34 home runs, 103 RBIs, and a league-leading 114 walks, as the Yankees finished in second place, seven games behind the Senators. Athletics manager Connie Mack selected him to play right field in the first Major League Baseball All-Star Game, held on July 6, 1933, at Comiskey Park in Chicago. He hit the first home run in the All-Star Game's history, a two-run blast against Bill Hallahan during the third inning, which helped the AL win the game 4–2. During the final game of the 1933 season, as a publicity stunt organized by his team, Ruth was called upon and pitched a complete game victory against the Red Sox, his final appearance as a pitcher. Despite unremarkable pitching numbers, Ruth had a 5–0 record in five games for the Yankees, raising his career totals to 94–46.

In 1934, Ruth played in his last full season with the Yankees. By this time, years of high living were starting to catch up with him. His conditioning had deteriorated to the point that he could no longer field or run. He accepted a pay cut to $35,000 from Ruppert, but he was still the highest-paid player in the major leagues. He could still handle a bat, recording a .288 batting average with 22 home runs, and on July 13, 1934, he hit his 700th career home run. However, Reisler described these statistics as "merely mortal" by Ruth's previous standards. Ruth was selected to the AL All-Star team for the second consecutive year, even though he was in the twilight of his career. During the game, New York Giants pitcher Carl Hubbell struck out Ruth and four other future Hall-of-Famers consecutively. The Yankees finished second again, seven games behind the Tigers.

=== Boston Braves (1935) ===
By this time, Ruth knew he was nearly finished as a player. He desired to remain in baseball as a manager. He was often spoken of as a possible candidate as managerial jobs opened up, but in 1932, when he was mentioned as a contender for the Red Sox position, Ruth stated that he was not yet ready to leave the field. There were rumors that Ruth was a likely candidate each time when the Cleveland Indians, Cincinnati Reds, and Detroit Tigers were looking for a manager, but nothing came of them.

Just before the 1934 season, Ruppert offered to make Ruth the manager of the Yankees' top minor-league team, the Newark Bears, but he was talked out of it by his wife, Claire, and his business manager, Christy Walsh. Tigers owner Frank Navin seriously considered acquiring Ruth and making him player-manager. However, Ruth insisted on delaying the meeting until he came back from a trip to Hawaii. Navin was unwilling to wait. Ruth opted to go on his trip, despite Barrow advising him that he was making a mistake; in any event, Ruth's asking price was too high for the notoriously tight-fisted Navin. The Tigers' job ultimately went to Mickey Cochrane.

Early in the 1934 season, Ruth made no secret of his desire to manage the Yankees. However, that job was never a serious possibility. Ruppert always supported McCarthy, who would remain in his position for another 12 seasons. The relationship between Ruth and McCarthy had been lukewarm at best, and Ruth's open campaigning to replace him further chilled their interpersonal relations. By the end of the season, Ruth hinted that he would retire unless Ruppert named him manager of the Yankees. When the time came, Ruppert wanted Ruth to leave the team without drama or hard feelings.

During the 1934–35 offseason, Ruth circled the world with his wife; the trip included a barnstorming tour of the Far East. At his final stop in the United Kingdom before returning home, Ruth was introduced to cricket by Australian player Alan Fairfax, and after having little luck in a cricketer's stance, he stood as a baseball batter and launched some massive shots around the field, destroying the bat in the process. Although Fairfax regretted that he could not have the time to make Ruth a cricket player, Ruth had lost any interest in such a career upon learning that the best batsmen made only about $40 per week.

Also during the offseason, Ruppert had been sounding out the other clubs in hopes of finding one that would be willing to take Ruth as a manager or player. However, the only serious offer came from Athletics owner-manager Connie Mack, who gave some thought to stepping down as manager in favor of Ruth. However, Mack later dropped the idea, saying that Ruth's wife would be running the team in a month if Ruth ever took over.

While the barnstorming tour was underway, Ruppert began negotiating with Boston Braves owner Judge Emil Fuchs, who wanted Ruth as a gate attraction. The Braves had enjoyed modest recent success, finishing fourth in the National League in both 1933 and 1934, but the team drew poorly at the box office. Unable to afford the rent at Braves Field, Fuchs had considered holding dog races there when the Braves were not at home, only to be turned down by Landis. After a series of phone calls, letters, and meetings, the Yankees traded Ruth to the Braves on February 26, 1935. Ruppert had stated that he would not release Ruth to go to another team as a full-time player. For this reason, it was announced that Ruth would become a team vice president and would be consulted on all club transactions, in addition to playing. He was also made assistant manager to Braves skipper Bill McKechnie. In a long letter to Ruth a few days before the press conference, Fuchs promised Ruth a share in the Braves' profits, with the possibility of becoming co-owner of the team. Fuchs also raised the possibility of Ruth succeeding McKechnie as manager, perhaps as early as 1936. Ruppert called the deal "the greatest opportunity Ruth ever had".

There was considerable attention as Ruth reported for spring training. He did not hit his first home run of the spring until after the team had left Florida, and was beginning the road north in Savannah. He hit two in an exhibition game against the Bears. Amid much press attention, Ruth played his first home game in Boston in over 16 years. Before an opening-day crowd of over 25,000, including five of New England's six state governors, Ruth accounted for all the Braves' runs in a 4–2 win over the New York Giants, hitting a two-run home run, singling to drive in a third run and later in the inning scoring the fourth. Although age and weight had slowed him, he made a running catch in left field that sportswriters deemed the defensive highlight of the game.

Ruth had two hits in the second game of the season, but it quickly went downhill both for him and the Braves from there. The season soon settled down to a routine of Ruth performing poorly on the few occasions he even played at all. As April passed into May, Ruth's physical deterioration became even more pronounced. While he remained productive at the plate early on, he could do little else. His conditioning had become so poor that he could barely trot around the bases. He made so many errors that three Braves pitchers told McKechnie they would not take the mound if he was in the lineup. Before long, Ruth stopped hitting as well. He grew increasingly annoyed that McKechnie ignored most of his advice. McKechnie later said that Ruth's presence made enforcing discipline nearly impossible.

Ruth soon realized that Fuchs had deceived him, and had no intention of making him manager or giving him any significant off-field duties. He later said his only duties as vice president consisted of making public appearances and autographing tickets. Ruth also found out that far from giving him a share of the profits, Fuchs wanted him to invest some of his money in the team in a last-ditch effort to improve its balance sheet. As it turned out, Fuchs and Ruppert had both known all along that Ruth's non-playing positions were meaningless.

By the end of the first month of the season, Ruth concluded he was finished even as a part-time player. As early as May 12, he asked Fuchs to let him retire. Ultimately, Fuchs persuaded Ruth to remain at least until after the Memorial Day doubleheader in Philadelphia. In the interim was a western road trip, at which the rival teams had scheduled days to honor him. In Chicago and St. Louis, Ruth performed poorly, and his batting average sank to .155, with only two additional home runs for a total of three on the season. In the first two games in Pittsburgh, Ruth had only one hit, though a long fly caught by Paul Waner probably would have been a home run in any other ballpark besides Forbes Field.

Ruth played in the third game of the Pittsburgh series on May 25, 1935, and added one more tale to his playing legend. Ruth went 4-for-4, including three home runs, though the Braves lost the game 11–7. The last two were off Ruth's old Cubs nemesis, Guy Bush. The final home run, both of the game and of Ruth's career, sailed out of the park over the right field upper deck–the first time anyone had hit a fair ball completely out of Forbes Field. Ruth was urged to make this his last game, but he had given his word to Fuchs to stay on through Memorial Day and played in Cincinnati and Philadelphia. The first game of the doubleheader in Philadelphia—the Braves lost both—would be his final major league appearance. Ruth retired on June 2 after an argument with Fuchs. He finished 1935 with a .181 average—easily his worst as a full-time position player—and the final six of his 714 home runs. The Braves, 10–27 when Ruth left, finished 38–115, their .248 record being the worst winning percentage in modern National League history. Insolvent like his team, Fuchs gave up control of the Braves before the end of the season; the National League took over the franchise at the end of the year.

== Career overall ==
At the time of his retirement, Ruth held many baseball batting records. These include the career records for home runs (714), slugging percentage (0.690), runs batted in (2,213), bases on balls (2,062) and on-base percentage (.474). He still remains in the top ten of many statistical rankings.

=== Statistics and achievements ===
Batting

Legend
**Bold**	All-time leader

Category	Years	WAR	G	AB	R	H	2B	3B	HR	TB	XBH	RBI	SB	BB	AVG	OBP	SLG	OPS	FLG%	Ref.
Total	22	162.2	2,503	8,399	2,174	2,873	506	136	714	5,793	1,356	2,214	123	2,062	.342	.474	**.690**	**1.164**	.968	

Pitching

Category	Years	WAR	W	L	W-L%	ERA	G	GS	CG	SHO	IP	H	R	ER	HR	BB	SO	FIP	WHIP	Ref.
Total	10	20.4	94	46	.671	2.28	163	147	107	17	1,221 1/3	974	400	309	10	441	488	2.81	1.159	

== Retirement ==
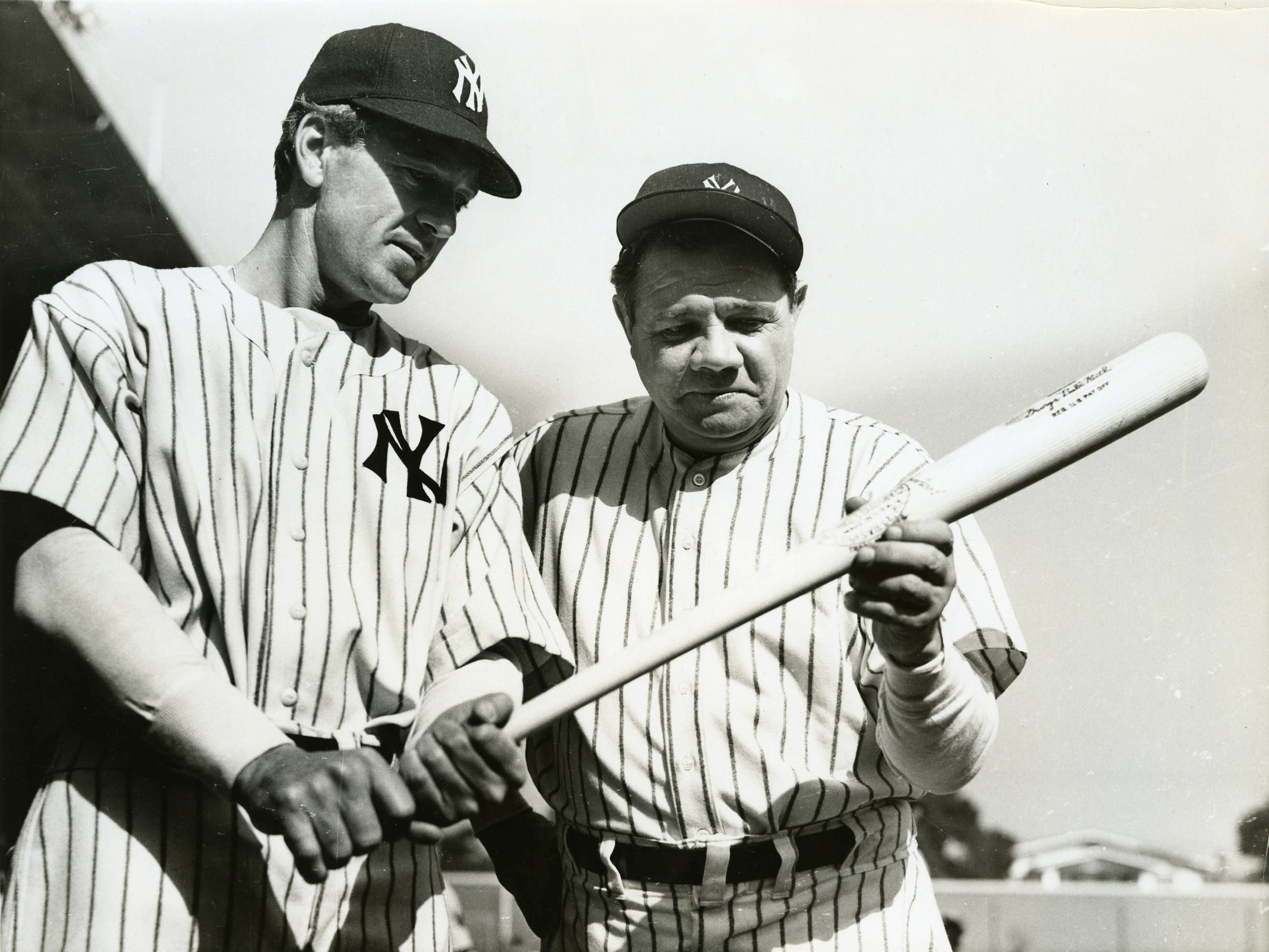
Gary Cooper and Ruth in the 1942 film The Pride of the Yankees

Although Fuchs had given Ruth his unconditional release, no major league team expressed an interest in hiring him in any capacity. Ruth still hoped to be hired as a manager if he could not play anymore, but only one managerial position, Cleveland, became available between Ruth's retirement and the end of the 1937 season. Asked if he had considered Ruth for the job, Indians owner Alva Bradley replied negatively. Of the five members in the inaugural class of Baseball Hall of Fame in 1936 (Ty Cobb, Honus Wagner, Christy Mathewson, Walter Johnson and Ruth), only Ruth was not given an offer to manage a baseball team. Team owners and general managers assessed Ruth's flamboyant personal habits as a reason to exclude him from a managerial job; Barrow said of him, "How can he manage other men when he can't even manage himself?" Creamer believed Ruth was unfairly treated in never being given an opportunity to manage a major league club. The author believed there was not necessarily a relationship between personal conduct and managerial success, noting that John McGraw, Billy Martin, and Bobby Valentine were winners despite character flaws.

Ruth played much golf and in a few exhibition baseball games, where he demonstrated a continuing ability to draw large crowds. This appeal contributed to the Dodgers hiring him as first base coach in 1938. When Ruth was hired, Brooklyn general manager Larry MacPhail made it clear that Ruth would not be considered for the manager's job if, as expected, Burleigh Grimes retired at the end of the season. Although much was said about what Ruth could teach the younger players, in practice, his duties were to appear on the field in uniform and encourage base runners—he was not called upon to relay signs. In August, shortly before the baseball rosters expanded, Ruth sought an opportunity to return as an active player in a pinch hitting role. Ruth often took batting practice before games and felt that he could take on the limited role. Grimes denied his request, citing Ruth's poor vision in his right eye, his inability to run the bases, and the risk of an injury to Ruth.

Ruth got along well with everyone except team captain Leo Durocher, who was hired as Grimes' replacement at season's end. Ruth then left his job as a first base coach and would never again work in any capacity in the game of baseball.

On July 4, 1939, Ruth spoke on Lou Gehrig Appreciation Day at Yankee Stadium as members of the 1927 Yankees and a sellout crowd turned out to honor the first baseman, who was forced into premature retirement by ALS, which would kill him two years later. The next week, Ruth went to Cooperstown, New York, for the formal opening of the Baseball Hall of Fame. Three years earlier, he was one of the first five players elected to the hall. As radio broadcasts of baseball games became popular, Ruth sought a job in that field, arguing that his celebrity and knowledge of baseball would assure large audiences, but he received no offers. During World War II, he made many personal appearances to advance the war effort, including his last appearance as a player at Yankee Stadium, in a 1943 exhibition for the Army-Navy Relief Fund. He hit a long fly ball off Walter Johnson; the blast left the field, curving foul, but Ruth circled the bases anyway. In 1946, he made a final effort to gain a job in baseball when he contacted new Yankees boss MacPhail, but he was sent a rejection letter. In 1999, Ruth's granddaughter, Linda Tosetti, and his daughter, Julia Ruth Stevens, said that Babe's inability to land a managerial role with the Yankees caused him to feel hurt and slump into a severe depression.

Ruth started playing golf when he was 20 and continued playing the game throughout his life. His appearance at many New York courses drew spectators and headlines. Rye Golf Club was among the courses he played with teammate Lyn Lary in June 1933. With birdies on 3 holes, Ruth posted the best score. In retirement, he became one of the first celebrity golfers participating in charity tournaments, including one where he was pitted against Ty Cobb.

== Personal life ==
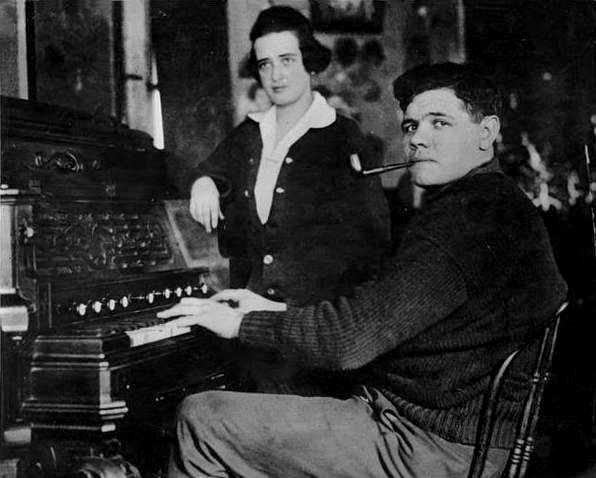
Ruth and his first wife, Helen Woodford, 1915

Ruth met Helen Woodford, by some accounts, in a coffee shop in Boston, where she was a waitress. They married as teenagers on October 17, 1914. Although Ruth later claimed to have been married in Elkton, Maryland, records show that they were married at St. Paul's Catholic Church in Ellicott City. They adopted a daughter, Dorothy, in 1921. Ruth and Helen separated around 1925 reportedly because of Ruth's repeated infidelities and neglect. They appeared in public as a couple for the last time during the 1926 World Series. Helen died in January 1929 at age 31 in a fire in a house in Watertown, Massachusetts owned by Edward Kinder, a dentist with whom she had been living as "Mrs. Kinder". In her book, My Dad, the Babe, Dorothy claimed that she was Ruth's biological child by a mistress named Juanita Jennings. In 1980, Juanita, who was at the time very ill, admitted this to Dorothy and Dorothy's sister, Julia.

On April 17, 1929, three months after the death of his first wife, Ruth married actress and model Claire Merritt Hodgson and adopted her daughter Julia. It was the second and final marriage for both parties. Claire was well-travelled and educated, and put structure into Ruth's life, like Miller Huggins did for him on the field.

By one account, Julia and Dorothy were, through no fault of their own, the reason for the seven-year rift in Ruth's relationship with teammate Lou Gehrig. Sometime in 1932, during a conversation that she assumed was private, Gehrig's mother remarked, "It's a shame [Claire] doesn't dress Dorothy as nicely as she dresses her own daughter." When the comment got back to Ruth, he angrily told Gehrig to tell his mother to mind her own business. Gehrig, in turn, took offense at what he perceived as Ruth's comment about his mother. The two men reportedly never spoke off the field until they reconciled at Yankee Stadium on Lou Gehrig Appreciation Day, July 4, 1939, shortly after Gehrig's retirement from baseball.

Although Ruth was married throughout most of his baseball career, when team co-owner Tillinghast 'Cap' Huston asked him to tone down his lifestyle, Ruth replied, "I'll promise to go easier on drinking and to get to bed earlier, but not for you, fifty thousand dollars, or two-hundred and fifty thousand dollars will I give up women. They're too much fun." A detective that the Yankees hired to follow him one night in Chicago reported that Ruth had been with six women. Ping Bodie said that he was not Ruth's roommate while traveling; "I room with his suitcase". Before the 1922 season, Ruth had signed a three-year contract at $52,000 per year (equivalent to $1,000,000 in 2025) with an option to renew for two additional years. His performance during the 1922 season had been disappointing, attributed in part to his drinking and late-night hours. After the end of the 1922 season, he signed a contract addendum with a morals clause. It called for Ruth to abstain entirely from the use of intoxicating liquors, and to not stay up later than 1:00 a.m. during the training and playing season without permission of the manager. Ruth was also enjoined from any action or misbehavior that would compromise his ability to play baseball.

Ruth was a self described Democrat. In 1928, Ruth campaigned for Democratic presidential nominee Al Smith.

== Cancer and death (1946–1948) ==
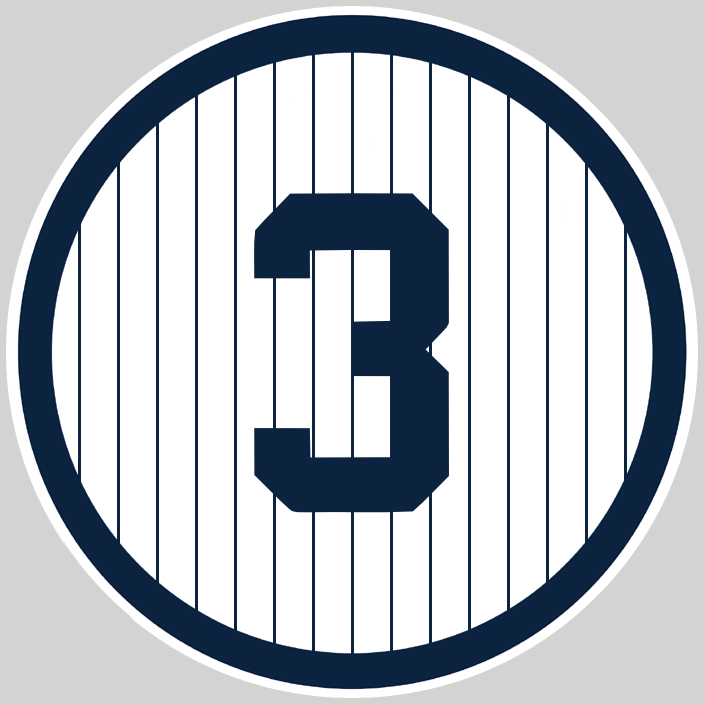
Babe Ruth's number 3 was retired by the New York Yankees in 1948.

As early as the war years, doctors had cautioned Ruth to take better care of his health, and he grudgingly followed their advice, limiting his drinking and not going on a proposed trip to support the troops in the South Pacific. In 1946, Ruth began experiencing severe pain over his left eye and had difficulty swallowing. In November 1946, tests at French Hospital in New York revealed that he had an inoperable malignant tumor at the base of his skull and in his neck. The malady was known as nasopharyngeal carcinoma, or lymphoepithelioma. A physician who reviewed Ruth's autopsy in 1998 concluded that Ruth's lifelong use of tobacco "probably played a part". His fame gave him access to experimental treatments, and he was one of the first cancer patients to receive drugs and radiation treatment simultaneously. Having lost 80 pounds (36 kg), he was discharged from the hospital in February and went to Florida to recuperate. He returned to Yankee Stadium after the season started. The new commissioner, Happy Chandler (Judge Landis had died in 1944), proclaimed April 27, 1947, Babe Ruth Day, with the most significant observance to be at Yankee Stadium. A number of teammates and others spoke in honor of Ruth, who briefly addressed the crowd of almost 60,000. By then, his voice was a soft whisper with a very low, raspy tone.

The doctors had not told Ruth he had cancer because of his family's fear that he might do himself harm. They treated him with pterolyl triglutamate (Teropterin), a folic acid derivative; he may have been the first human subject. Ruth showed dramatic improvement during the summer of 1947, so much so that his case was presented by his doctors at a scientific meeting, without using his name. He was able to travel around the country, doing promotional work for the Ford Motor Company on American Legion Baseball. He appeared again at another day in his honor at Yankee Stadium in September, but was not well enough to pitch in an old-timers game as he had hoped.

The improvement was only a temporary remission, and by late 1947, Ruth was unable to help with the writing of his autobiography, The Babe Ruth Story, which was almost entirely ghostwritten. In and out of the hospital in Manhattan, he left for Florida for six weeks in February 1948. He also traveled to California to witness the filming of the movie based on the book.

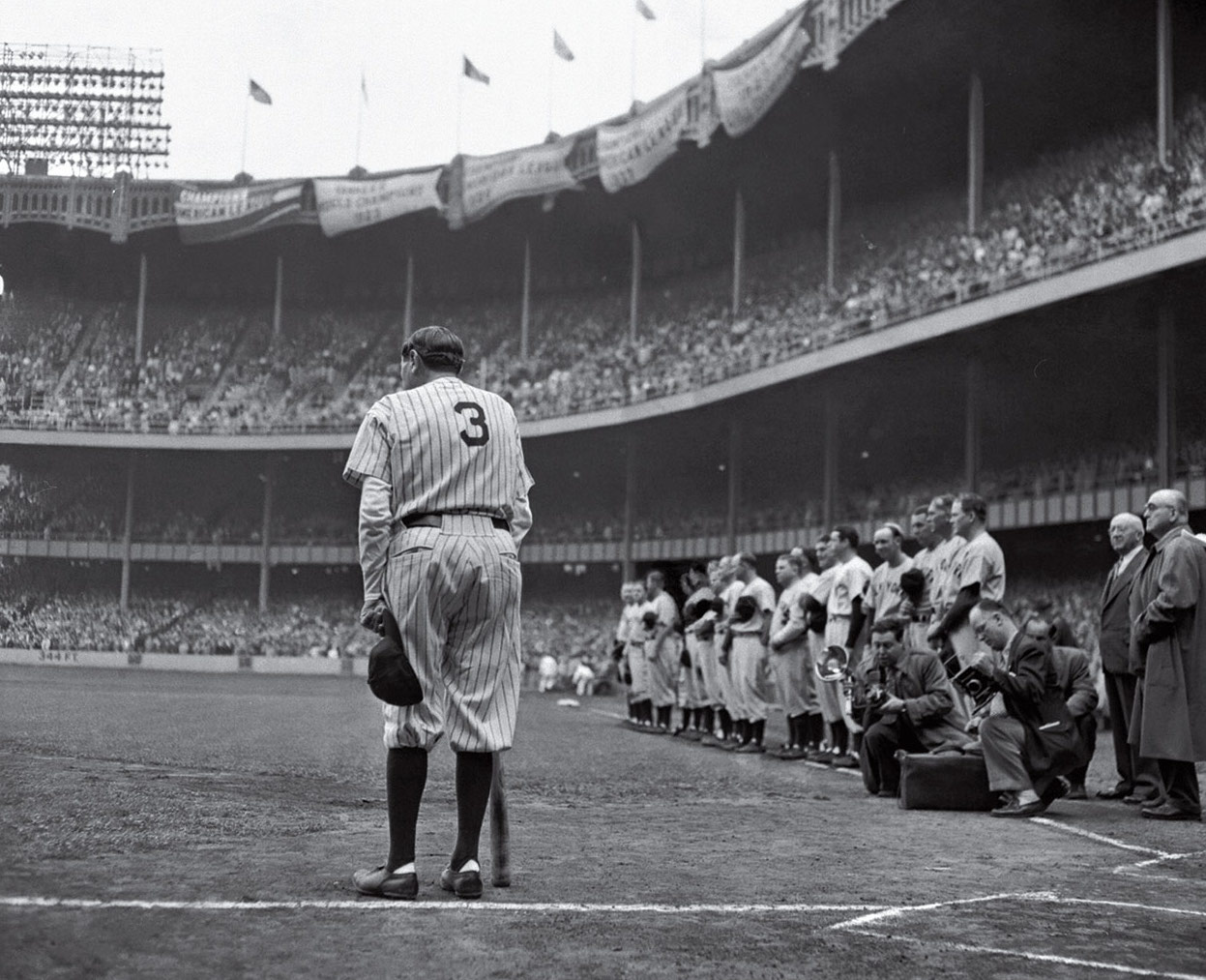
Nat Fein's Pulitzer Prize–winning photo of Ruth titled Babe Ruth Bows Out at Yankee Stadium prior to the Yankees' retirement of his jersey number on June 13, 1948.

On June 5, 1948, a "gaunt and hollowed-out" Ruth visited Yale University to donate a manuscript of The Babe Ruth Story to its library. On June 13, Ruth visited Yankee Stadium for the final time, appearing at the 25th-anniversary celebrations of "The House that Ruth Built". By this time he had difficulty walking. Introduced along with his surviving teammates from 1923, Ruth used a bat as a cane. Nat Fein's photo of Ruth taken from behind, standing near home plate and facing "Ruthville" (right field), became one of baseball's most famous and widely circulated photographs, and won the Pulitzer Prize.

Ruth made one final trip on behalf of American Legion Baseball. He then entered Memorial Hospital. He was never told he had cancer, though he surmised it. He was able to leave the hospital for a few short trips, including a final visit to Baltimore. On July 26, 1948, Ruth attended the premiere of the film The Babe Ruth Story. Shortly thereafter, he returned to the hospital for the final time. He was barely able to speak. Ruth's condition gradually grew worse, and only a few visitors were permitted, one of whom was National League president and future Commissioner of Baseball Ford C. Frick. "Ruth was so thin it was unbelievable. He had been such a big man and his arms were just skinny little bones, and his face was so haggard", Frick said years later.

Thousands of New Yorkers, including many children, stood vigil outside the hospital during Ruth's final days. On August 16, 1948, at 8:01 p.m., Ruth died in his sleep at the age of 53. His funeral service took place over three days. His open casket was displayed in the rotunda of Yankee Stadium for two days; 77,000 people filed past to pay him tribute. His Requiem Mass was celebrated by Francis Cardinal Spellman at St. Patrick's Cathedral; a crowd estimated at 75,000 waited outside. Ruth is buried with his second wife, Claire, at the Gate of Heaven Cemetery in Hawthorne, New York.

== Memorial and museum ==
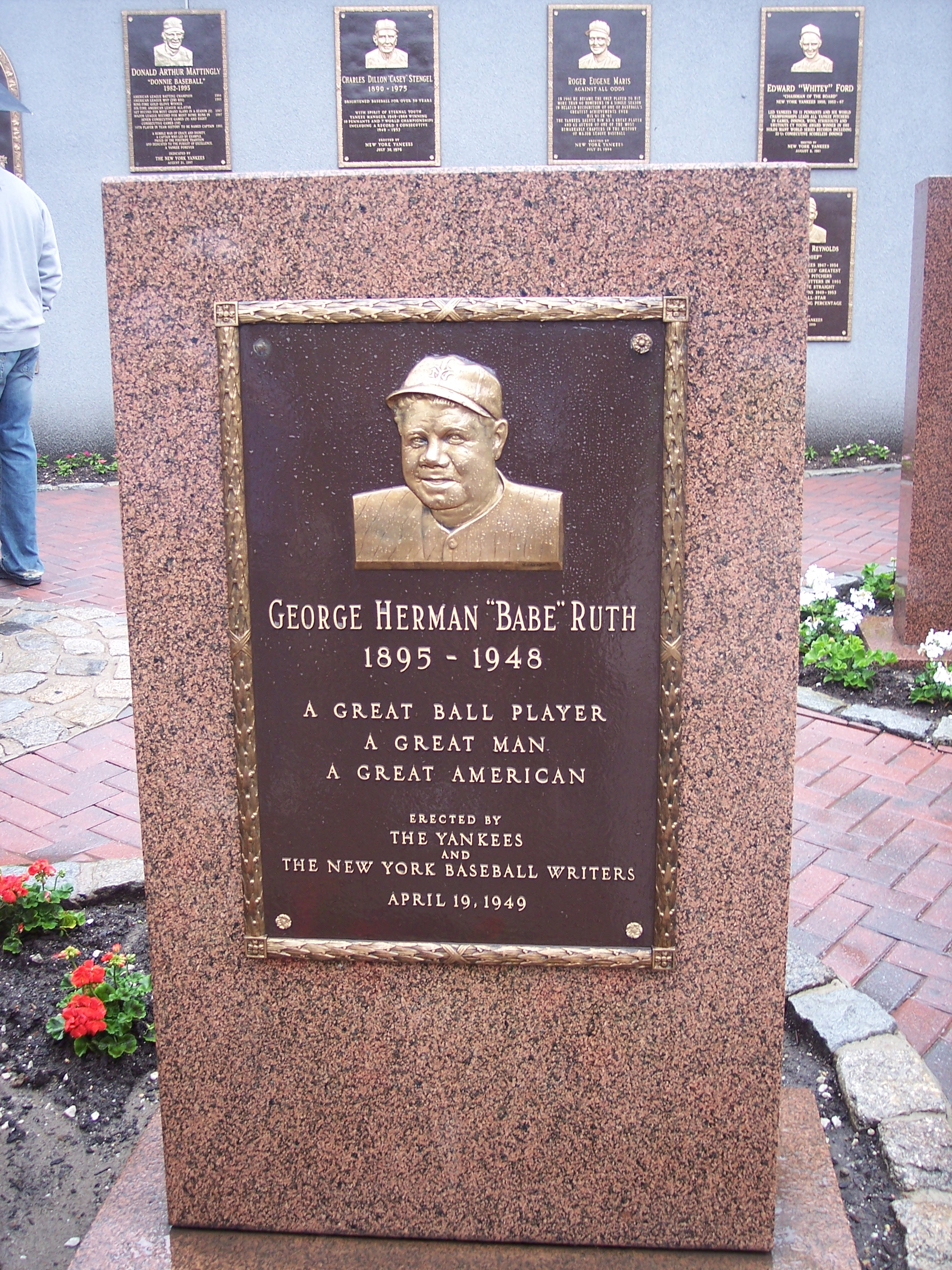
Tribute to Babe Ruth, Monument Park, as seen at the original Yankee Stadium

On April 19, 1949, the Yankees unveiled a granite monument in Ruth's honor in center field of Yankee Stadium. The monument was located in the field of play next to a flagpole and similar tributes to Huggins and Gehrig until the stadium was remodeled from 1974 to 1975, which resulted in the outfield fences moving inward and enclosing the monuments from the playing field. This area was known thereafter as Monument Park. Yankee Stadium, "the House that Ruth Built", was replaced after the 2008 season with a new Yankee Stadium across the street from the old one; Monument Park was subsequently moved to the new venue behind the center field fence. Ruth's uniform number 3 has been retired by the Yankees, and he is one of five Yankees players or managers to have a granite monument within the stadium.

In 1974, Ruth's birthplace in Baltimore was opened to the public as the Babe Ruth Birthplace and Museum. The museum houses a collection of artifacts from Ruth's life, including some rare baseball cards and the earliest known signature of Ruth, from when he was still pitching in the schoolyard.

== Impact ==
Ruth was the first baseball star to be the subject of overwhelming public adulation. Baseball had been known for star players such as Ty Cobb and "Shoeless Joe" Jackson, but both men had uneasy relations with fans. Ruth's biographers agreed that he benefited from the timing of his ascension to "Home Run King". The country had been hit hard by both the war and the 1918 flu pandemic and longed for something to help put these traumas behind it. Ruth also resonated in a country which felt, in the aftermath of the war, that it took second place to no one. Montville argued that Ruth was a larger-than-life figure who was capable of unprecedented athletic feats in the nation's largest city. Ruth became an icon of the social changes that marked the early 1920s. Glenn Stout writes that "Ruth was New York incarnate—uncouth and raw, flamboyant and flashy, oversized, out of scale, and absolutely unstoppable".

During his lifetime, Ruth became a symbol of the United States. During World War II, Japanese soldiers yelled in English, "To hell with Babe Ruth", to anger American soldiers. Ruth replied that he hoped "every Jap that mention[ed] my name gets shot". He reconciled with the Japanese after the war ended. Creamer recorded that "Babe Ruth transcended sport and moved far beyond the artificial limits of baselines and outfield fences and sports pages". Wagenheim stated, "He appealed to a deeply rooted American yearning for the definitive climax: clean, quick, unarguable." According to Glenn Stout, "Ruth's home runs were [an] exalted, uplifting experience that meant more to fans than any runs they were responsible for. A Babe Ruth home run was an event unto itself, one that meant anything was possible."

Although Ruth was not just a power hitter—he was the Yankees' best bunter, and an excellent outfielder—Ruth's penchant for hitting home runs altered how baseball is played. Prior to 1920, home runs were unusual, and managers tried to win games by getting a runner on base and bringing him around through such means as the stolen base, the bunt, and the hit and run. Advocates of what was dubbed "inside baseball", such as Giants manager McGraw, disliked the home run, considering it a blot on the purity of the game. According to sportswriter W. A. Phelon, Ruth's breakout performance in 1920 and the response in excitement and attendance, "settled, for all time to come, that the American public is nuttier over the Home Run than the Clever Fielding or the Hitless Pitching. Viva el Home Run and two times viva Babe Ruth, exponent of the home run, and overshadowing star." Bill James states, "When the owners discovered that the fans liked to see home runs, and when the foundations of the games were simultaneously imperiled by disgrace [in the Black Sox Scandal], then there was no turning back." While a few, such as McGraw and Cobb, decried the passing of the old-style play, teams quickly began to seek and develop sluggers.

According to sportswriter Grantland Rice, only two sports figures of the 1920s approached Ruth in popularity—boxer Jack Dempsey and racehorse Man o' War. One of the factors that contributed to Ruth's broad appeal was the uncertainty about his family and early life. Ruth appeared to exemplify the American success story, that even an uneducated youth, without any family wealth or connections, can do something better than anyone else. Montville writes that "the fog [surrounding his childhood] will make him forever accessible, universal. He will be the patron saint of American possibility." Similarly, the fact that Ruth played in the pre-television era, when a relatively small portion of his fans had the opportunity to see him play, allowed his legend to grow through word of mouth and the hyperbole of sports reporters. Reisler states that recent sluggers who surpassed Ruth's home run mark, such as Mark McGwire and Barry Bonds, generated much less excitement than when Ruth repeatedly broke the single-season home run record in the 1920s. Ruth dominated a relatively small sports world, while Americans of the present era have many sports available to watch.

== Legacy ==
The unveiling of a Babe Ruth memorial plaque in Baltimore's old Memorial Stadium in 1955 with Claire Ruth, his widow, present

Thomas Barthel describes Ruth as one of the first celebrity athletes; numerous biographies have portrayed him as "larger than life". A dominant figure in a field is often referred to as "the Babe Ruth" of that field. He was the first athlete to make more money from endorsements and off-the-field activities than from his sport. In 2006, Montville stated that more books have been written about Ruth than any other member of the Baseball Hall of Fame. The long ball era that Ruth started continues: owners build ballparks to encourage home runs.

In 1998, The Sporting News ranked him first on the list of "Baseball's 100 Greatest Players". In 1999, baseball fans named Ruth to the Major League Baseball All-Century Team. He was named baseball's Greatest Player Ever in a 1969 ballot. The Associated Press reported in 1993 that Muhammad Ali was tied with Babe Ruth as the most recognized athlete in America. In 1999, the Associated Press named Ruth the greatest athlete of the 20th century, while an ESPN poll ranked him the second-greatest North American athlete of the century. In 1983, the United States Postal Service honored Ruth with a twenty-cent stamp. In 2022, The Sporting News named Ruth on their "New York Mount Rushmore of Sports", while ESPN ranked him as the greatest baseball player ever.

Several of the most expensive items of sports memorabilia ever sold at auction are associated with Ruth. The jersey Ruth wore when hitting his "called shot" home run in the 1932 World Series sold in 2024 for a record $24 million. A Ruth 1920 Yankees jersey that sold for $4.4 million in 2012 (equivalent to $6.2 million in 2025) was, for several years, one of the most expensive piece of sports memorabilia ever sold. The bat with which he hit the first home run at Yankee Stadium is in The Guinness Book of World Records as the most expensive baseball bat sold at auction, having fetched $1.265 million in 2004 (equivalent to $2.1563 million in 2025). Other bats used by Ruth sold for $1.6 million in 2022 and $1.85 million in 2023. A hat of Ruth's from the 1934 season set a record for a baseball cap when David Wells sold it at auction for $537 thousand in 2012. In 2017, Charlie Sheen sold Ruth's 1927 World Series ring for $2 million, a record for a championship ring.

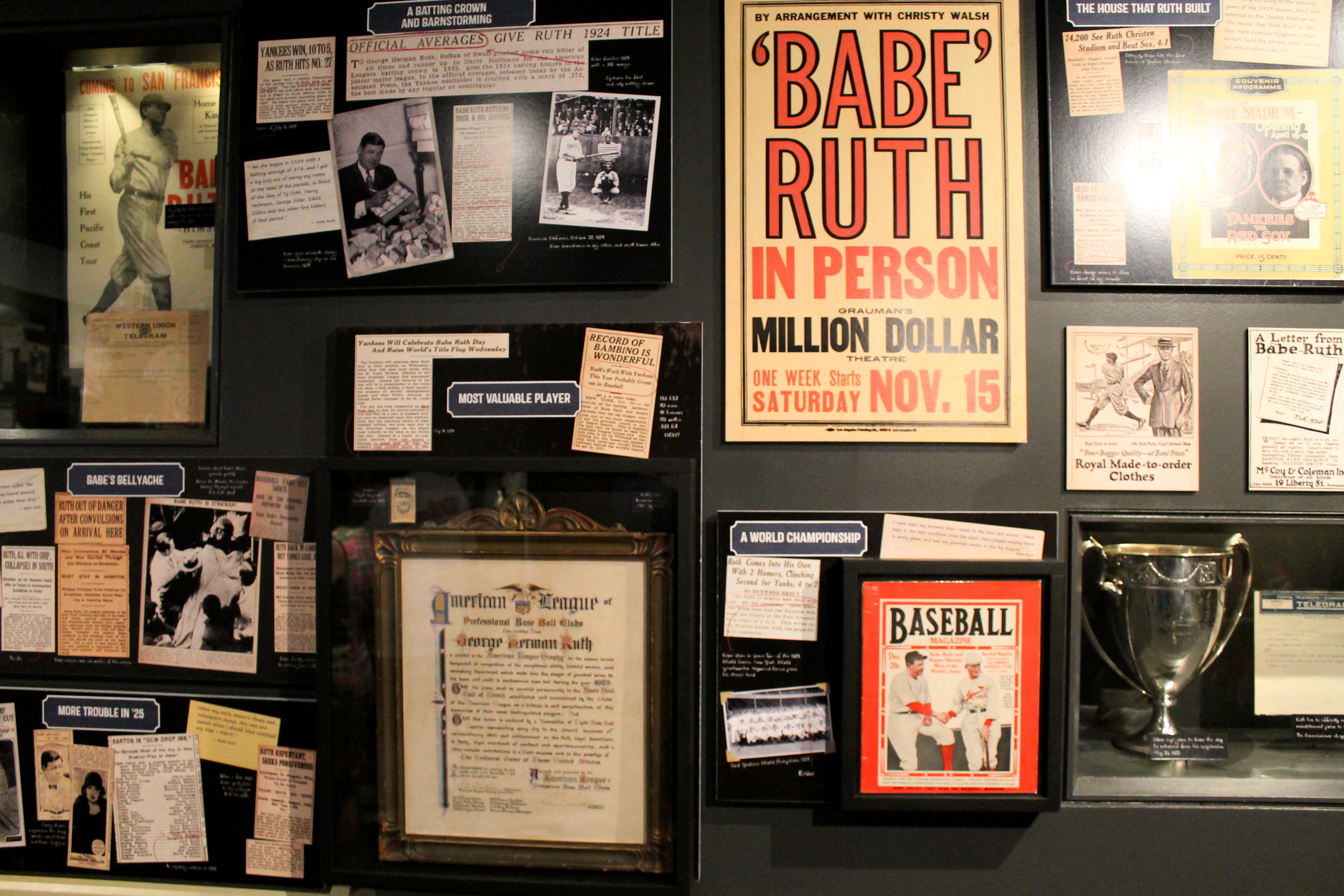
Ruth memorabilia at the Baseball Hall of Fame (2014)

One lasting legacy of the craze over Ruth may be the Baby Ruth candy bar. The Curtiss Candy Company maintained that the bar was named after Ruth Cleveland, daughter of president Grover Cleveland. She died in 1904 and the bar was first marketed in 1921, at the height of the craze over Ruth. He later sought to market candy bearing his name; he was refused a trademark because of the Baby Ruth bar. The Ruth estate licensed his likeness for use in an advertising campaign for Baby Ruth in 1995. In 2005, Baby Ruth became the official candy bar of Major League Baseball.

In 2018, Ruth was posthumously awarded the Presidential Medal of Freedom. Montville writes:

The fascination with his life and career continues. He is a bombastic, sloppy hero from our bombastic, sloppy history, origins undetermined, a folk tale of American success. His moon face is as recognizable today as it was when he stared out at Tom Zachary on a certain September afternoon in 1927. If sport has become the national religion, Babe Ruth is the patron saint. He stands at the heart of the game he played, the promise of a warm summer night, a bag of peanuts, and a beer. And just maybe, the longest ball hit out of the park.

== See also ==
- List of career achievements by Babe Ruth
- List of most valuable celebrity memorabilia
- Babe Ruth Award
- Babe Ruth Home Run Award
- Babe Ruth League
- List of Major League Baseball home run records
- List of Major League Baseball runs batted in records
- The Year Babe Ruth Hit 104 Home Runs
- Babe Ruth Bows Out
- Babe's Dream statue in Baltimore, Maryland

== Notes ==
Awards and achievements
Preceded by Bob Groom	No-hitter pitcher June 23, 1917 with Ernie Shore	Succeeded by Dutch Leonard
Records
Preceded by Roger Connor	Career home run record holder 1921–1974	Succeeded by Hank Aaron
Preceded by Ned Williamson	Single season home run record holder 1919–1960	Succeeded by Roger Maris
Sporting positions
Preceded by Roger Peckinpaugh	New York Yankees team captain May 20, 1922 – May 25, 1922	Succeeded by Everett Scott
