= Babe Ruth (disambiguation) =

Babe Ruth (1895–1948) was an American baseball outfielder and pitcher who played 22 seasons in Major League Baseball (MLB), from 1914 to 1935.

Babe Ruth may also refer to:

- Babe Ruth (band), a British rock band
- Babe Ruth Award, a baseball award
- Babe Ruth (film), a 1991 American drama film
- Ruth Cleveland, first daughter of US president Grover Cleveland

== See also ==
- Babe Ruth's called shot, a famous home run
- Babe Ruth League, a youth baseball program
- Baby Ruth, a candy bar
- The Babe Ruth Story, a 1948 biographical film
