= Babe Ruth Birthplace and Museum =

Babe Ruth's Birthplace and Museum in Baltimore

Coordinates: 39°17′08″N 76°37′31″W

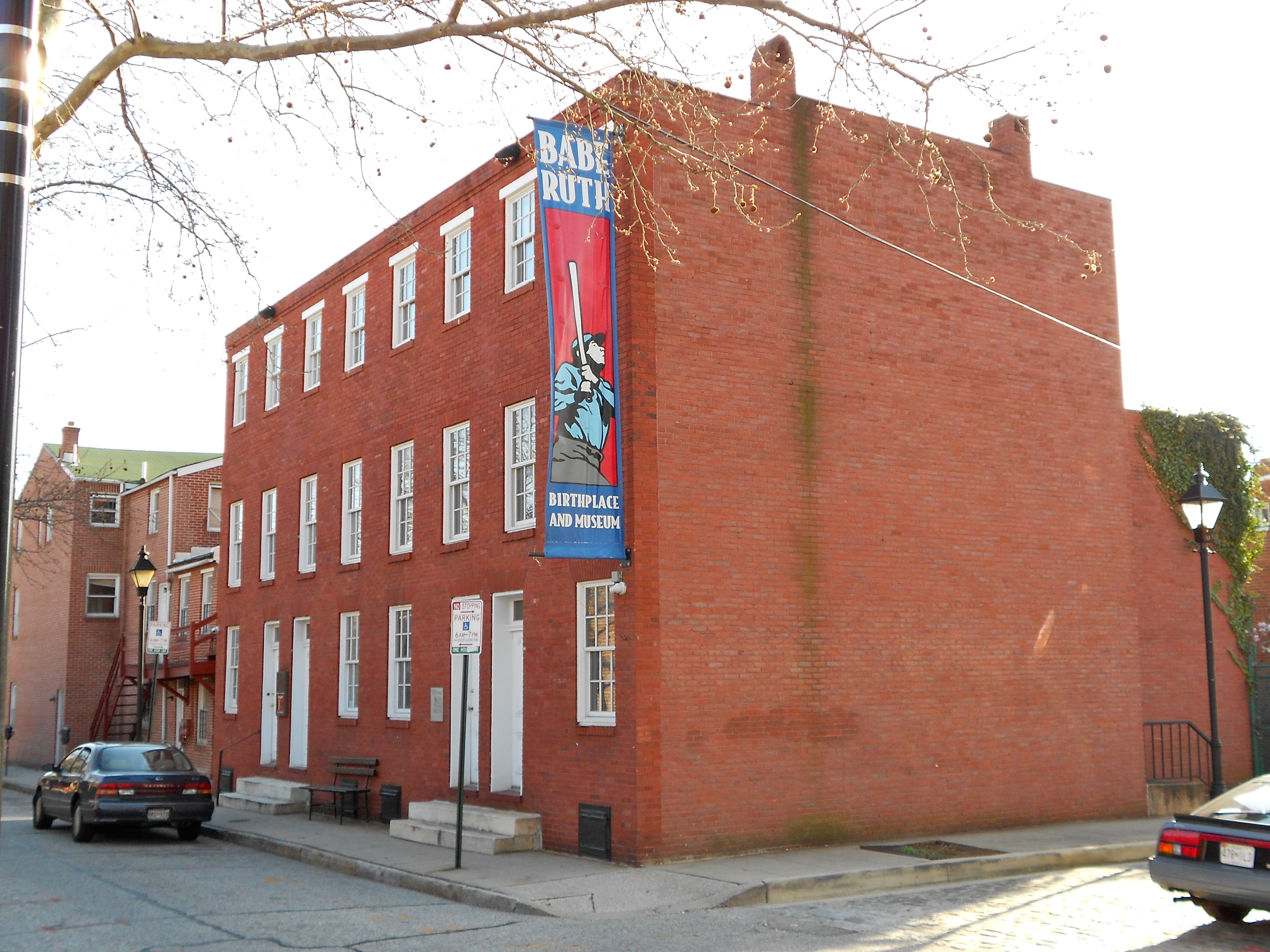
- Ruth's birthplace. c. 2012
- Established: July 1974
- Location: 216 Emory Street; Baltimore, MD 21230
- Governing body: Babe Ruth Birthplace Foundation
- Website: baberuthmuseum.org

The Babe Ruth Birthplace and Museum is a row house located at 216 Emory Street, in Baltimore, Maryland, where baseball legend Babe Ruth was born. The property was restored and opened to the public in 1974 by the Babe Ruth Birthplace Foundation, a non-profit organization.

The museum houses a collection of artifacts from Ruth's life, including some rare baseball cards and the earliest known signature of Ruth. The original museum underwent renovations to increase space, improve accessibility, and enhance the overall facility in 2015.

== History ==
The row house on 216 Emory Street in Ridgely's Delight, Baltimore, was leased by Pius Schamberger, Ruth's maternal grandfather. Ruth was born in the house on February 6, 1895 to George Herman Ruth Sr. and Katherine (née Schamberger).

By the 1960s, the row house and adjoining properties had fallen into disrepair and were scheduled to be demolished. However, Hirsh Goldberg, the press secretary for Baltimore Mayor Theodore McKeldin, successfully campaigned to save and restore the Birthplace. The museum officially opened in July 1974 as a "national shrine" to Ruth. The Babe Ruth Birthplace Foundation was formed to run the museum's operations. Ruth's widow, Claire, his two daughters, Dorothy and Julia, and his sister, Mamie (also born in 216 Emory Street), helped select and install exhibits for the museum.

In 1983, the museum became the official museum of the Baltimore Orioles. Hence, it also houses jerseys once worn by Orioles legends such as Frank Robinson, Cal Ripken Jr., and Jim Palmer. When Camden Yards opened in 1992, the ball which was hit for the first home run in the ballpark was donated to the Museum.

In 1985, the site was designated as the official archives of the Baltimore Colts football team. The Super Bowl V trophy won by the Colts is housed in the museum.

In 2015, renovations were undertaken with improved accessibility for disabled people, re-imagined galleries, repairs on decaying woodwork, as well as the addition of an entrance on Dover Street. The museum reopened to the public during the week both the New York Yankees and Boston Red Sox, Ruth's affiliated teams, were visiting Camden Yards to play the Orioles.

== See also ==
- Baltimore Orioles Hall of Fame
- Sports Legends Museum at Camden Yards
