= The Babe =

1992 film by Arthur Hiller

- Theatrical release poster
- Directed by: Arthur Hiller
- Written by: John Fusco
- Produced by: Walter Coblenz; Bill Finnegan
- Starring: John Goodman; Kelly McGillis; Trini Alvarado; Bruce Boxleitner
- Cinematography: Haskell Wexler
- Edited by: Robert C. Jones
- Music by: Elmer Bernstein
- Distributed by: Universal Pictures
- Release date: April 17, 1992
- Running time: 115 minutes
- Country: United States
- Language: English
- Box office: $19.9 million

The Babe is a 1992 American biographical sports drama film about the life of famed baseball player Babe Ruth, who is portrayed by John Goodman. Directed by Arthur Hiller, written by John Fusco, it was released in the United States on April 17, 1992, to mixed reviews. The somewhat fictionalized account of Ruth's life begins in Maryland with his childhood. The film covers his personal life and rise as a ball player with the Red Sox, trade to New York, and decline in health and career that ends with his walking away after being a "name only" manager to boost ticket sales.

== Plot ==
The story begins in Baltimore, Maryland in 1902 where seven-year-old George Herman Ruth Jr. is sent to the St. Mary's Industrial School for Boys, a reformatory and orphanage. Ruth is sent by his father, George Herman Ruth Sr., who cannot handle raising the boy on his own. At the school, Ruth is schooled by Catholic missionaries and ridiculed by the other children for his large size. Brother Matthias Boutlier, the Head of Discipline at St. Mary's, first introduces Ruth to the game of baseball. During a session of batting practice, Ruth hits several towering home runs. Matthias and others are stunned by Ruth's amazing power to drive the ball.

The film then flashes forward to 1914, where a 19-year-old Ruth excels on St. Mary's baseball team, both as a powerful hitter and a great pitcher. Ruth's amazing skills come to the attention of manager Jack Dunn. Since Ruth is underage, Dunn decides to adopt Ruth and sign him to a contract with the Baltimore Orioles. In the middle of the 1914 baseball season, Ruth is sold to the Boston Red Sox. Ruth begins to gain wide attention for his home runs and becomes popular in Boston. However, he angers Red Sox owner Harry Frazee during a party, and following the 1919 season, Ruth demands a raise and a suite for road games. Instead of meeting his demands, Frazee sells him to the New York Yankees to finance his Broadway shows, which have lost money.

Ruth becomes very popular in New York, helping the Yankees win the 1923 World Series. Later he hits two home runs for Johnny Sylvester, a sick boy whom he had recently visited in hospital. Two years later, after divorcing his first wife, Helen Woodford, Ruth starts to go into a slump. His teammate Lou Gehrig begins to steal his spotlight, becoming known as the "Iron Horse" and "The Pride of the Yankees". After getting pelted with lemons during a game, Ruth gets angry and storms onto the dugout, yelling at the crowd and further tarnishing his failing public image with the team.

In 1927, Ruth returns to his old self and hits 60 home runs, breaking his old record of 59. During game three of the 1932 World Series against the Cubs, he "calls his shot" by pointing to center field, then hits a towering home run.

By 1934, Ruth's career is well on the decline. He wants to pursue his post-career ambition of managing a baseball team, but Yankees owner Colonel Jacob Ruppert decides to release him instead. Under the promise of becoming a manager, Ruth signs with the Boston Braves, but his presence on the team is more comedic than anything else. Before a game against the Pittsburgh Pirates, Ruth overhears the Boston owners saying he's only good for drawing a gate. He responds by hitting three home runs in the game—then dramatically shuns the owner's proffered handshake of congratulations and drops his Braves cap on the ground, indicating that he is quitting the team.

The film ends with Ruth broken, trudging alone through the entrance tunnel. He is confronted by Johnny, now a grown man, who tells Ruth that he is still his hero and returns the signed ball that Ruth gifted him during his hospital visit when Johnny was sick. Ruth remarks, "I'm gone, Johnny. I'm gone" and begins to leave, but Johnny calls after him "You're the best... you're the best there's ever been!"

== Cast ==
- John Goodman – Babe Ruth
- Kelly McGillis – Claire Hodgson Ruth
- Trini Alvarado – Helen Woodford Ruth
- Bruce Boxleitner – Jumpin' Joe Dugan
- Peter Donat – Harry Frazee
- J. C. Quinn – Jack Dunn
- Joe Ragno – Miller Huggins
- James Cromwell – Brother Mathias
- Richard Tyson – Guy Bush
- Ralph Marrero – Ping Bodie
- Bob Swan – George Herman Ruth Sr.
- Bernard Kates – Colonel Jacob Ruppert
- Michael McGrady – Lou Gehrig
- Danny Goldring – Bill Carrigan
- Guy Barile – Johnny Torrio
- Bernie Gigliotti – Al Capone
- Ian McCabe – Kid Who Fails Math Test
- W. Earl Brown – Herb Pennock
- Thom C. Simmons – Bill McKechnie
- Rick Reardon – Ernie Shore
- Randy Steinmeyer – Ty Cobb
- Wayne Messmer – Yankee Stadium Announcer
- Larry Cedar – Forbes Field Announcer
- Michael Kendall – Jack Warhop
- Harry Hutchinson – Tris Speaker
- Irma P. Hall – Fanny Baily
- Stephen Caffrey - Older Johnny
- Shannon Cochran – The Flopper
- Al Hoffman - Baseball player on Babe Ruths team

== Production ==
Principal photography began on May 13, 1991, and wrapped on July 30, 1991. Danville Stadium, in Danville, Illinois, was where the scenes for Fenway Park and Forbes Field were filmed, as well as the black/white news footage. Chicago's Wrigley Field stood in for Yankee Stadium during filming. Temporary walls were placed over the ivy-covered brick for the New York scenes. The Noble–Seymour–Crippen House, the oldest building in Chicago, appears in the film.

== Historical errors ==
The film took several liberties with Ruth's life and career, most notably in its portrayal of his "Called Shot" and his hitting of two home runs for a sick child. Critics have noted that the film preferred to portray the legend of Babe Ruth, rather than be a factual biopic.

The portrayal of Ruth as an overweight child is incorrect. He was quite lean, even skinny in his youth, and did not begin to put on weight until the 1920s.

In the film, Ruth hits his first homer as a newcomer to the Red Sox in 1914. Ruth actually played sporadically for the Sox in 1914 and did not homer until 1915. His three final home runs did indeed come at Pittsburgh's Forbes Field in one afternoon; however, he did not retire following (or during) the game as seen in the film nor did he take a seat in the Pittsburgh Pirates dugout. Furthermore, Ruth did not have a "courtesy runner" who would take over for Ruth upon reaching first base. Ruth appeared in five more games that year before injuring his knee and hanging it up.

In a scene during Ruth's career with the Yankees, in a 1925 game vs. the Boston Red Sox at Fenway Park, he hits a home run and the Green Monster is depicted. The Green Monster at that time was actually covered with advertisements; it was not painted solid green until 1947.

In real life, 11-year-old Johnny Sylvester had fallen off a horse and suffered from persistent osteomyelitis. However, he did not have a prolonged stay in a hospital, as seen in the film. His wealthy father had connections to some sportswriters, who passed a baseball around the dugout. On the ball, Ruth wrote that he would hit a homerun for Johnny in the next game. Ruth hit three homeruns the next day in Game Four of the 1926 World Series. Ruth later visited Johnny at the boy's home and gifted him another baseball. In 1948, a staged reunion was arranged by the media; Johnny visited the dying Ruth, and showed him the two baseballs that Ruth had gifted to him as a child.

During the 1932 World Series scenes, where the action is taking place at Wrigley Field, the ivy had not yet been planted.

The veracity of the "called shot" in 1932, which Ruth is said to have made by pointing, is still debated. Babe Ruth biographer Glenn Stout noted that Ruth and the Cubs "razzed" one another, and Ruth made "some gestures" during the game. In existing footage of the game, it is unclear if he is pointing at the Cubs' dugout or towards the outfield. The story of Ruth calling his shot was written two days later, claiming he pointed towards the sky. Stout felt that the story of Ruth indicating where he was going to hit his shot was "plausible" due to Ruth's skill as a hitter.

== Reception ==
=== Box office ===
The film was not a financial success, grossing only $4.6 million on its opening weekend in wide release. It grossed over $19.9 million worldwide at the box-office during a five-week theatrical run.

=== Critical response ===
The film received mixed reviews from critics. A frequent complaint was that Goodman did not remotely resemble Ruth. On Rotten Tomatoes, it has an approval rating of 47% based on 38 reviews. Audiences surveyed by CinemaScore gave the film a grade A− on scale of A to F. Critics complained that the film was both unnecessarily depressing and overly sentimental.

Sportswriter Jerome Holtzman of the Chicago Tribune gave the film a fairly positive review, with the headline "'Babe' Not Factual but Entertaining." He called it a film "fleshed with fable," and "afloat in a tub of marshmallow sentimentality," but that it was "two hours of good entertainment."

Roger Ebert of the Chicago Sun-Times, gave the film a one out of four stars, declaring that "Apart from being a bad film in the first place, aside from being superficially written, aside from being shot with little sense of time or place, the movie portrays Babe Ruth as a man almost completely lacking in the ability to have, or to provide, happiness." On the television show Siskel & Ebert, Gene Siskel called The Babe a "cornball movie," "amateurish," and compared its quality to a "movie of the week." Both Ebert and Siskel included it as one of the worst movies of 1992.

In an interview on Inside the Actors Studio and The Howard Stern Show, John Goodman admitted that he was disappointed in his own performance.

In a 2020 retrospective, Dave Fisher of The Pitcher's List panned the film, criticizing the film's awkward pacing, clichéd plot structure, and historical inaccuracies. He ultimately felt the movie "literally [had] no redeeming qualities," and expressed surprise that the film managed to garner mixed reviews upon its initial release.

== See also ==
- The Babe Ruth Story (1948) - cited as one of the worst movies of all time, starring William Bendix
- Babe Ruth - 1991 biopic starring Stephen Lang
- The Natural (1984)
- Everyone's Hero (2006)
- List of baseball films
