= The Babe Ruth Story =

1948 film by Roy Del Ruth

- Theatrical poster
- Directed by: Roy Del Ruth
- Screenplay by: George Callahan; Bob Considine
- Based on: The Babe Ruth Story; 1948 novel by Bob Considine; Babe Ruth
- Produced by: Roy Del Ruth
- Starring: William Bendix; Claire Trevor; Charles Bickford
- Narrated by: Knox Manning
- Cinematography: Philip Tannura
- Edited by: Richard Heermance
- Music by: Edward Ward
- Production company: Roy Del Ruth Productions
- Distributed by: Allied Artists
- Release date: July 26, 1948
- Running time: 106 minutes
- Country: United States
- Language: English
- Budget: $1,300,000
- Box office: $2.4 million (US rentals)

The Babe Ruth Story is a 1948 American biographical film directed by Roy Del Ruth. The film is a fictionalized depiction of professional baseball player Babe Ruth, who achieved fame as a slugging outfielder for the New York Yankees. The film stars William Bendix, Claire Trevor, and Charles Bickford.

A film on Ruth's life was in talks for years following his real-life success. However, the project underwent production hell as deals fell through with multiple studios. Ruth initially wanted to portray himself in the film, but ultimately, his deteriorating health prevented him. The casting of Bendix as Babe Ruth received backlash due to his lack of resemblance to Ruth, a move that was defended by the film's producers. The film was rushed due to the real life Babe Ruth's declining health, and the final film makes no mention to Ruth's first wife, Helen Woodford Ruth. Ruth was able to view the finished film three weeks before his death in August 1948 to esophageal cancer.

It was distributed in the United States by Allied Artists on July 26, 1948. During its initial release, the film received generally positive reviews from critics. However, retrospective critical reviews have been negative, with its writing, Bendix's performance, historical inaccuracies, lack of baseball scenes, and Ruth's direction sparking criticism, now being considered one of the worst films ever made and one of the worst biopics of all time. The film received $2.4 million through US rentals.

== Plot ==
In 1906, at the Baltimore Waterfront, 11-year-old George Herman Ruth Jr. is allowed by his father to be taken away by Brother Matthias to St. Mary's after being forced to work in his rowdy saloon. When George is 18, his incredible baseball talent gets him hired to play for the Baltimore Orioles, and during the interview, he gets his "Babe" nickname.

Babe becomes a successful baseball player and is soon sold off to play for the Boston Red Sox. After a bad game, Babe wonders what went wrong at a bar, until Claire Hodgson tells him that when he pitches his curveball he sticks out his tongue. He continues his success, landing a new $10,000 contract. He finds Claire, but she gives him the cold shoulder. During one game, Denny, a sick paralyzed child, and his father watch Babe Ruth play. When Babe says "Hiya, keed" to the boy, the child is miraculously cured and stands up.

Babe soon becomes a player for the New York Yankees. During one game, he accidentally hurts a dog and decides to take the dog and the dog's young owner to the hospital. After Babe argues with the doctors that a dog is the same as a human, the dog is treated, but because Babe left a game to do this, he gets suspended from the Yankees. A depressed Babe Ruth finds himself at a bar, and amidst the crowd giving off negative vibes, he starts a fight with one of the gamblers who tried to make him throw the game and gets arrested.

Soon, he decides to play Santa Claus at a children's hospital, where he runs into Claire again, visiting her nephew. She tells him that his actions affect the children of America, and Babe decides to keep that in mind. Miller Huggins, the same man who suspended Babe, fights to bring him back to the Yankees as the team has had a bad season. Babe is soon brought back, and the team wins the World Series thanks to him. With this, he and Claire get married. Soon after, Huggins dies from pyaemia.

During Game 3 of the 1932 World Series, Babe gets a call from the father of a dying child and promises the father that when he goes up to bat, he will call the third shot and the ball will land at a certain spot; all of this will be for the boy. During the game, Babe does exactly that, and the boy hears the news and starts to get better.

Babe retires from the Yankees at the age of 41, and takes a management position with the Boston Braves, even though they want him to play in the games despite his age. During one game, Babe gets stressed out and can't continue playing, and retires from baseball after that game. Sadly, this means he goes off contract by retiring during his time with the Braves and is fired from anything related to baseball.

Later, Babe complains of neck pain and soon learns that he is dying of throat cancer. The news of this leads fans to send letters telling Babe that they care. The doctors decide to try a treatment on Babe with a chance that he'll survive. As Babe is taken to surgery, the narrator gives words of encouragement to baseball fans, crediting Babe Ruth for America's love of the sport.

== Cast ==
- William Bendix as George Herman Ruth Jr./Babe Ruth
  - Robert Ellis as 11 year old George
- Claire Trevor as Claire Hodgson Ruth
- Charles Bickford as Brother Matthias
- William Frawley as Jack Dunn
- Sam Levene as Phil Conrad
- Matt Briggs as Col. Jacob Ruppert
- Fred Lightner as Miller Huggins
- Mark Koenig as himself
- Mel Allen as himself
- H.V. Kaltenborn as himself

== Development ==
During the 1940s, numerous film producers attempted to adapt Ruth's life into a biopic. Mark Hellinger tried to purchase Sandy Mock and Hal Levy's script King of Swat in 1941. Ruth himself later offered to sell the film rights to his life to Republic Pictures in exchange for $150,000 and a percentage of the film's gross. Although the studio rejected this deal after months of negotiations, the rival Monogram Pictures agreed to it. Sports writer Bob Considine was subsequently hired to co-write both an autobiography and biopic screenplay with Ruth. The sale was announced in July 1947 with production scheduled for September. However filming was delayed as they sought an actor to play Ruth.

=== Casting ===
Ruth originally wanted to appear as himself, but his declining health made this impossible. Producers subsequently considered Orson Welles, Jack Carson, Dennis Morgan, and Paul Douglas for the role. Walter Mirisch of Moogram felt the best candidate was Carson but he was under contract to Warner Bros. who would not release him. Mirsch attributed this to the stigma that Monogram Pictures had within the industry at the time which prevented the studios from getting top rank stars. Instead, Monogram cast William Bendix, who was not as big a star. Bendix's casting was announced in January 1948 after a reported six month search.,

The casting was criticized because Bendix did not resemble Ruth, although the producers claimed that this was because they wanted to hire a professional actor rather than a stand-in. Charlie Root, Nana Bryant, Barton Yarborough, Wally Scott, and Paul Bryar were also originally intended to be in the film. Root claimed that he declined because the film portrayed Ruth's called shot at the 1932 World Series, which he himself had pitched with the Chicago Cubs, inaccurately.

== Production ==
The production was shot on location, primarily at Wrigley Field in Chicago. Other locations included St. Mary's Industrial School for Boys in Baltimore, Fenway Park in Boston, Yankee Stadium in New York City, Forbes Field in Pittsburgh, and Comiskey Park in Chicago.

A replica of Yankee Stadium was built.

The film's budget was $1,300,000 but with prints and advertising this went up to $1,600,000.

== Release ==
The film was rushed to release following news of Ruth's declining health and makes no mention whatsoever of Ruth's first wife, Helen. Despite his condition, Ruth briefly visited the set of the production in Los Angeles and travelled there again to attend the premiere. However, his condition worsened during the screening, and he died three weeks later. His appearance at the premiere was his last public appearance. Ruth's daughter wrote "When he got out of the theatre he had no idea where he was because of the amount of drugs that were in his system. It was one of the cruelest scenes that I have ever witnessed in my life." She claimed Ruth "never realized" what he was watching.

== Reception ==
=== Critical ===
Contemporary trade and newspaper reviews were mixed to positive on balance. Variety called the film "interesting, if semi-fictional" with "warmth, tears and chuckles," while Harrison's Reports praised its "box-office" appeal and Bendix's performance.

Later reassessments have been far more negative; for example, The Providence Journal wrote that the film "turns up on nearly every list of the worst movies ever made," and outlets such as Newsday, The A.V. Club, and Moviefone have included it among the worst sports films or biopics.

Harrison's Reports called it "a highly successful picture, from the box-office as well as the entertainment point of view," adding that Bendix "handles his part with skill and restraint," and that "few people will come out of the theatre with dry eyes." BoxOffice also ran a positive review, praising the film for its "great warmth and its constant down-to-earth humanness" with "much to appeal to every taste and age," and calling Bendix's portrayal of Ruth "flawless." Shirley Povich of The Washington Post called Bendix "a believable Babe Ruth who, saddled with some of the worst lines and situations ever handed an actor, waded smartly through the mess and gave the screen its best baseball picture ... Hollywood didn't have to take all that license with it, but the nice thing is that the story of Ruth is too powerful for even Hollywood to mess up more than a trifle."

Negative reviews cited the film's moments of heavy-handedness, lack of good baseball action scenes, and dubious portrayal of Ruth as a childlike, kind-hearted oaf. Bosley Crowther of The New York Times wrote that it had "much more the tone of low-grade fiction than it has of biography ... it is hard to accept the presentation of a great, mawkish, noble-spirited buffoon which William Bendix gives in this picture as a reasonable facsimile of the Babe." Crowther also found it "a little incongruous to see a picture about a baseball star containing no more than a minimum of action on a playing field—and most of that studio action which is patently phony and absurd."

John McCarten of The New Yorker also panned the film, calling it "soggy with bathos" and writing that Bendix "handles a bat as if it were as hard to manipulate as a barrel stave. Even with a putty nose, Mr. Bendix resembles Mr. Ruth not at all, and he certainly does the hitter an injustice by representing him as a kind of Neanderthal fellow." Otis Guernsey Jr. of the New York Herald Tribune wrote that the movie "has been sentimentalized out of all possibility of stimulating film biography. It would be hard to find a more colorful American figure than the Babe for motion picture documentation and it would be difficult to do a worse job with him than has been done here."

The Monthly Film Bulletin of Britain wrote: "This film illustrates the American habit of canonizing baseball players, for apparently Babe Ruth did not only perform remarkable feats on the field, but could also perform miracles by curing the sick and the crippled. This power is demonstrated four times in the film, each in an increasingly embarrassing manner, and William Bendix portrays Babe Ruth as a half-witted giant without any redeeming pathos."

More recent assessments have been overwhelmingly negative. The Providence Journal writes that it "turns up on nearly every list of the worst movies ever made, with good reason". In an interview with Dan Shaughnessy of The Boston Globe, Ted Williams called The Babe Ruth Story "the worst movie I ever saw", while The Washington Times stated that the film "stands as possibly the worst movie ever made". The film has been called one of the worst sports films ever by Newsday and The A.V. Club, and called one of the worst biopics by Moviefone and Spike. Michael Sauter included it in his book The Worst Movies of All Time, and Leonard Maltin called it "perfectly dreadful".

Ruth's daughter called the film "nothing more than another money-making scheme dreamed up by the carpetbaggers who masqueraded as my father's friends." She felt "the main concern was to release the film before he died" and his second wife Claire "was as much to blame as anyone because she approved everything in the film not my father... It looked more like The Claire Ruth Story than The Babe Ruth Story... The stilted dialogue, contrived scenes and stereotypical characters made the film for laughable than watchable."

=== Box office ===
According to Variety, The Babe Ruth Story earned an estimated $2.4 million in U.S. theatrical rentals for 1948. It was the most popular film in the history of Allied Artists until taken over by Riot in Cell Block 11. However Variety claimed in April 1949 that the film only made a small profit.

The film was released in Japan owing to Ruth's popularity there.

== See also ==
- The Jackie Robinson Story – 1950 biopic starring Jackie Robinson
- Babe Ruth – 1991 biopic starring Stephen Lang
- The Babe – 1992 biopic featuring John Goodman
- 1948 in film
- List of baseball films
- List of 20th century films considered the worst

== Notes ==
- Pirone, Dorothy Ruth (1988). My dad, the Babe : growing up with an American hero. Boston: Quinlan Press.
