= Lisa Zane =

American actress (born 1961)

- Born: April 5, 1961 (age 65); Chicago, Illinois, U.S.
- Occupation: Actress
- Years active: 1989–present
- Family: Billy Zane (brother)
- Website: lisazane.com

Lisa Zane (born April 5, 1961) is an American actress.

== Early life ==
Zane was born in Chicago, the daughter of Thalia and William George Zane Sr. Her parents, who are both of Greek descent, founded a medical technical school. Her family's original surname, "Zanetakos", was anglicized to "Zane" by her father. She is the older sister of actor Billy Zane.

== Career ==
Zane's first film role was in the 1989 film Heart of Dixie. She starred in Gross Anatomy the same year. Other early acting roles included playing Diane Leeds in the first season of medical drama ER, as Claire in Bad Influence (1990), counselor Maggie Burroughs in Freddy's Dead: The Final Nightmare (1991), the title role in The Nurse (1997) and a cameo as the gynecologist in the comedy Cruel but Necessary (2005). She was a series regular as Melina Paros in L.A. Law from 1992 to 1993, JoAnne Meltzer in Profit, Diana in Roar, Le Sage in Dinotopia for Hallmark Entertainment and Sophia Keener in Law and Order in 2006. She provided the voice for She-Hulk in the first season of The Incredible Hulk, as well as Charley Davidson in Biker Mice from Mars in the follow-up 2006 series, taking over from Leeza Miller-McGee.

She has originated many roles on stage, playing Varya in David Mamet's debut adaptation of The Cherry Orchard at the Goodman Theatre, Rita in Craig Lucas's Prelude to a Kiss and Cleo in Lyle Kessler's Robbers. Zane has also made many guest appearances on TV shows, including Lifestories: Families in Crisis, The Outer Limits, Judging Amy, and The Division.

Zane is a singer, BMI songwriter, and recording artist. In 2006, the Songwriters Hall of Fame recognized her as one of their new songwriters of the year.

Zane played the part of the "alter ego" in Amanda Eliasch's play "As I Like It" in 2012, and an award-winning documentary drama The Gun the Cake and the Butterfly (2014), in which she sang with Charles Eliasch.

The same year she performed in The Girl from Nagasaki, a film by Michel Comte based on Madame Butterfly. In 2013, Zane performed in The Chateau Marmont in Los Angeles.

== Personal life ==
Zane was in a relationship with her Fox TV series Roar co-star, Australian actor Heath Ledger, from 1997 to 1998.

== Filmography ==
=== Film ===
Year	Title	Role	Notes
1989	Heart of Dixie	M.A.	
1989	Gross Anatomy	Luann	
1989	Pucker Up and Bark Like a Dog	Taylor	
1990	Bad Influence	Claire	
1990	The Age of Insects	Sara	
1991	Femme Fatale	Cynthia	
1991	The Passion of Martin	Rebecca	
1991	Freddy's Dead: The Final Nightmare	Maggie Burroughs	
1994	Floundering	Jessica	
1994	Unveiled	Stephanie Montgomery	
1995	Terrified	Pearl	
1996	Baby Face Nelson	Helen Womack	
1996	The Nervous Breakdown of Philip K. Dick	Tessa	Short film
1997	The Nurse	Laura Harriman	
1999	The Secret Pact	Denise Wokowski	
1999	A Table for One	Ariana Harpwood	
1999	The Lovely Leave	The Wife	Short film
2001	Monkeybone	Medusa	
2005	Cruel but Necessary	Gynecologist	
2013	The Gun, the Cake and the Butterfly	Opera Singer	
2013	The Girl from Nagasaki	Jazz Singer	
2017	Game Day	Ricki's Mom	
2021	Later Days	Madame De'coy	
2022	Alex/October	Betty	

=== Television ===
Year	Title	Role	Notes
1989	Gideon Oliver	Carter	Episode: "Tongs"
1991	My Life and Times	Lilly	Episode: "Millennium"
1991	Babe Ruth	Claire Hodgson Ruth	TV movie
1992	Human Target	Robin	Episode: "Chances Are"
1992	Middle Ages	Nora Conover	Episode: "The Pig in the Python"
1992–93	L.A. Law	Melina Paros	Main cast (season 7)
1994	Natural Selection	Elizabeth Braden	TV movie
1994	Diagnosis: Murder	Meg Westlin	Episode: "The Restless Remains"
1994	Lifestories: Families in Crisis	Lori	Episode: "Confronting Brandon: The Intervention of an Addict"
1994	XXX's & OOO's	Louisia	TV movie
1995	ER	Diane Leeds	Supporting role (season 1)
1995	The Great Defender	Rhoda	Episode: "Naked Truth"
1995	Her Deadly Rival	Lynne	TV movie
1995	Iron Man	Madame Masque	Episode: "Beauty Knows No Pain" (voice role)
1996	The Incredible Hulk	She-Hulk	2 episodes (voice role)
1996–97	Profit	Joanne Meltzer	Main cast
1997	Roar	Queen Diana	Main cast
1998	The Outer Limits	Natalie Grainger	Episode: "Sarcophagus"
2000	Stolen from the Heart	Karen Ravetch	TV movie
2000	Missing Pieces	Renata	TV movie
2002–03	Dinotopia	Le Sage	Main cast
2003	Judging Amy	Mrs. Novins	Episode: "Ye Olde Freedom Inn"
2003	Dragnet	Deborah Larson	Episode: "The Brass Ring"
2004	The Division	Lisa	Episode: "It's the Real Thing"
2006	Law & Order	Sophia Keener	Episode: "Cost of Capital"
2006	Murder in My House	Roxanne	TV movie
2006	Point Pleasant	Anne Gibson	2 episodes
2006–07	Biker Mice from Mars	Charley, Carol	Recurring role (season 1, voice role)
2009	Southland	Lana Schmidt	Episode: "Westside"
2017	Chicago Justice	Judge Fotis	Episode: "Uncertainty Principle"
