= Julia Ruth Stevens =

American writer, Babe Ruth's adopted daughter (1916–2019)

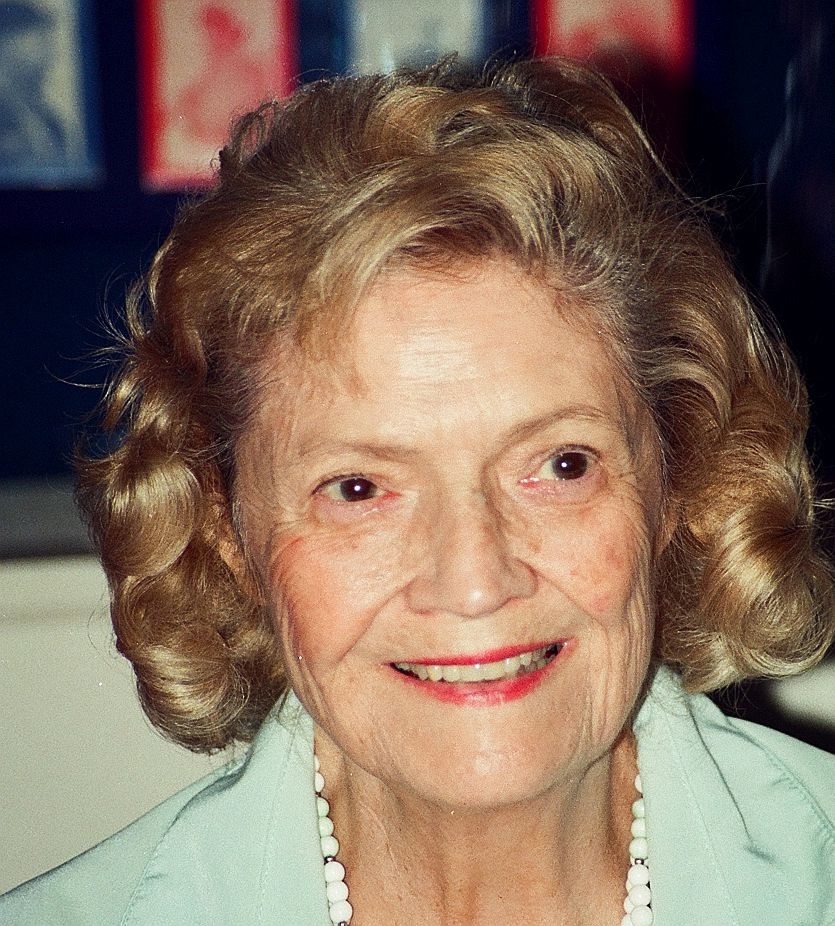
- Julia Ruth Stevens in 1999
- Born: Julia Marshall Hodgson; July 7, 1916; Athens, Georgia
- Died: March 9, 2019 (aged 102); Henderson, Nevada
- Known for: Adopted daughter of Babe Ruth
- Spouses: Richard Flanders (died 1949); Grant Meloon (divorced); Brent Stevens (m. 1970)
- Parents: Frank Hodgson (biological father); Claire Merritt Ruth (biological mother); Babe Ruth (adopted father)

Julia Ruth Stevens (born Julia Marshall Hodgson; July 7, 1916 – March 9, 2019) was the adopted daughter of American baseball player Babe Ruth and the biological daughter of his second wife Claire Merritt Ruth.

Stevens was born Julia Hodgson to Claire (née Merritt) and Frank Hodgson in Athens, Georgia. Her father, who died in 1921, was estranged from her mother soon after Julia was born. The mother and daughter moved to New York City where Claire worked as a model.

Her mother met Babe Ruth in 1923, and they married in 1929. Ruth subsequently adopted Julia. Through the marriage, she also gained a sister, Dorothy.

Julia was married three times. Her first husband was Richard Flanders who died in 1949. Her second marriage to Grant Meloon ended in divorce but produced a son. Her third marriage to Brent Stevens lasted 49 years. She had one son, Tom, from her second marriage who was adopted by her third husband. Through Tom, she has two grandchildren and four great-grandchildren.

Stevens was a fan of the Boston Red Sox. Later in life, she spent her time upholding the legacy of her adoptive father and wrote three books on him. Along with her mother and sister, she helped save her father's birthplace in Baltimore. Particularly, she was deeply involved in the Babe Ruth League.

In 1989, she and her sister were a joint plaintiffs along with the Babe Ruth League in a trademark dispute with Macmillan Incorporated over use of their father's likeness.

She died in March 2019 in an assisted living facility in Henderson, Nevada, at the age of 102. The cause of death was pulmonary embolism. Before moving to the facility, she was a long-time resident of Conway, New Hampshire, where she was an innkeeper.

== Bibliography ==
- Stevens, Julia Ruth; Beim, George (1998). Babe Ruth: A Daughter's Portrait. Taylor Trade Publishing. ISBN 978-0878339952.
- Stevens, Julia Ruth; Gilbert, Bill (2001). Major League Dad: A Daughter's Cherished Memories. Triumph Books. ISBN 978-1892049278.
- Stevens, Julia Ruth; Gilbert, Bill (2008). Babe Ruth: Remembering the Bambino in Stories, Photos & Memorabilia. Stewart, Tabori and Chang. ISBN 978-1584796978.
