= Erle V. Painter =

American chiropractor and athletic trainer

Erle Vansant Painter
- Born: December 20, 1881; Iowa, U.S.
- Died: September 1968, aged 86; Baldwin, New York, U.S.
- Occupations: Chiropractor; Athletic trainer
- Known for: New York Yankees trainer (1930–1942)

Erle Vansant Painter (December 20, 1881 – September 1968), or Doc, was an American chiropractor and athletic trainer for the Boston Braves (1929) and New York Yankees (1930–1942). He also helped direct the Brooklyn YMCA, and was a professor at Florida Southern College. Due to his role as trainer for the Yankee organization he was credited with "modernizing training methods for professional athletes".

== Early life ==
Erle Painter was born in Iowa in 1881 to parents John Albert Painter and Ella May (née) Humphrey. He attended Springfield College in Massachusetts, and later the New York School of Chiropractic (not related to the present-day New York Chiropractic College) where he graduated in 1920.

== Career ==
In 1917, as director of the Brooklyn YMCA, Painter was mustered into the army and given the rank of chief master in arms in order to help train soldiers in the first naval hospital unit. As chief master in arms Painter drilled the students in hospital-related activities such as the creation of improvised litters (or rescue baskets), and the loading of wagons for transportation of wounded soldiers. Upon the conclusion of the year long course, Painter was mustered back out of the army.

=== New York Yankees ===
Painter began working as the Yankees trainer in 1930, replacing the previous doctor Albert A. Woods. In 13 years with the Yankees, Painter would treat many prominent players such as Babe Ruth, Lou Gehrig, and Joe DiMaggio—whose foot he accidentally burned at the beginning of the 1936 season with a diathermy machine. He was described as "one of the most valuable men on the Yankee pay roll" and was credited with helping many players recover back to performance shape.

In 1942, Painter was dismissed without explanation from the position as trainer by manager Joe McCarthy. While no reason was given to Painter for his dismissal, some headlines debated if he was blamed for losing the 1942 World Series.

Many years following his dismissal, surrounding the debate of Babe Ruth's called shot, Painter shared his version of the story with the Baseball Hall of Fame stating, "Ruth made a three-quarter turn to the stands and held up one finger. It was plain he was signifying one strike didn't mean he was out. Root put over another strike and the Babe repeated the pantomime, holding up two fingers this time. Then, before taking his stance, he swept his left arm full length and pointed to the centerfield fence."

=== Post-Yankees ===
Following his leave of the Yankees, Painter became a professor at Florida Southern College, in Lakeland, Florida.

During his time in Florida, Painter joined physical trainer Jesse O'Brien in opening a sports health center in St. Petersburg, Florida.

== Personal life ==
Painter married Fanchon Fagin in 1909 with whom he had two children.

His second wife was Eleanora Virginia Buckley, whom he married in 1925.

Painter was one of the first chiropractors to be inducted into the American Chiropractic Association Sports Council Hall of Fame.
