= Dorothy Ruth Pirone =

American biographer; daughter of Babe Ruth

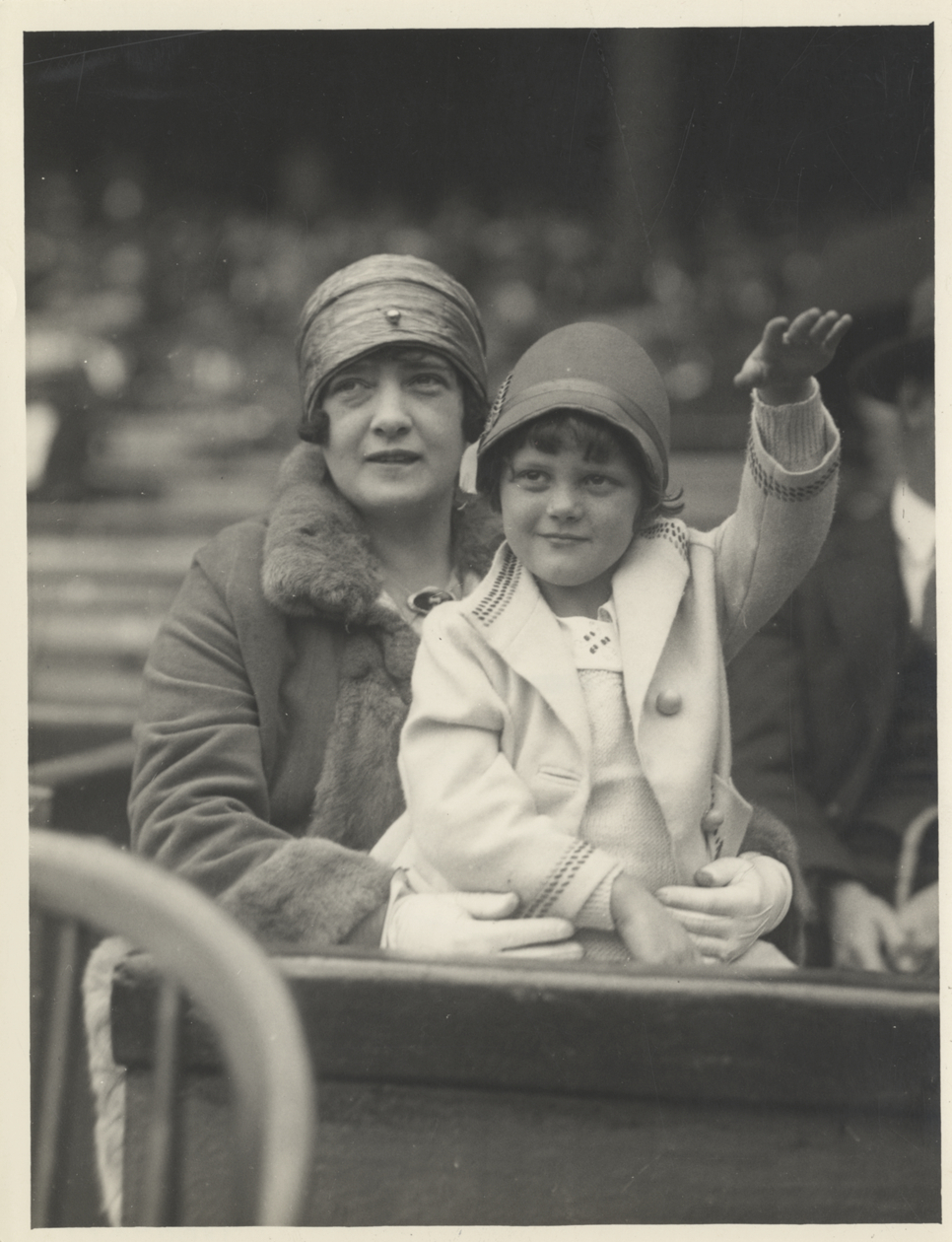
- Helen Woodford Ruth and Dorothy (1925)
- Born: Dorothy Helen Ruth; June 7, 1921; New York City, New York
- Died: May 18, 1989 (aged 67); Durham, Connecticut
- Known for: Daughter of Babe Ruth
- Parents: Babe Ruth (father); Juanita Jennings (mother)

Dorothy Ruth Pirone (born Dorothy Helen Ruth; June 7, 1921 – May 18, 1989) was the biological daughter of the American baseball player George H. (Babe) Ruth and his mistress Juanita Jennings, born Juanita Grenandtz. She was adopted by Babe and his first wife Helen Woodford Ruth of Boston, Massachusetts. She wrote a 1988 memoir of her father, titled My Dad, the Babe.

== Childhood ==
Dorothy was born June 7, 1921, in New York City at St. Vincent's Hospital to Juanita Jennings, and was adopted by George and Helen Ruth, née Woodford. It is documented that Dorothy was raised to believe that Helen was her biological mother. It is speculated that Helen did not know that Dorothy was the result of an extramarital affair between Babe and his girlfriend Jennings.

It is possible that when Babe Ruth learned of his mistress's pregnancy, he convinced Helen, unaware that Babe was the father, to adopt the baby girl. Babe Ruth also somehow convinced Dorothy's biological mother to allow him to adopt their daughter, so that she could be raised with him and a possibly unsuspecting Helen.

Helen and Babe Ruth separated sometime between 1924 and 1926, but did not divorce because of their religious beliefs. Dorothy lived with her adoptive mother Helen after the separation. In January 1929, when she was 7 years old, her mother died in a house fire. After Helen's death, Dorothy lived with her father and Claire Merritt Ruth, whom he married in April 1929. She had one sister, as Babe had adopted Claire's daughter Julia.

In 1980, Dorothy learned at the age of 59 that Juanita Jennings Ellias was her biological mother. Dorothy had known Juanita growing up, but only as a friend of her father. She referred to Jennings as Aunt Nita.

== Personal life ==
She married Daniel J. Sullivan, a Brooklyn employee of the Railway Express Agency, on January 7, 1940. Her son, Daniel J. Sullivan Jr. (1940–1974), was born in October 1940 and later had five children. Dorothy's marriage to Sullivan also produced two daughters, Genevieve Herrlein and Ellen Ruth Hourigan (1943-2017). Their marriage ended in 1945.

Dorothy later married Dominick Pirone in New York City on December 8, 1948. Three children were born of this second marriage: Donna Analovitch (1947-2026), Richard Pirone (1950–2001), and Linda Ruth Tosetti (b. 1954). She lived in Durham, Connecticut, raised Arabian horses, and wrote My Dad, the Babe.

She was a joint plaintiff with the Babe Ruth League, in a trademark dispute with Macmillan Incorporated over use of the Babe Ruth likeness.

She died on May 18, 1989, at the age of 67 in Durham, Connecticut.
