= Home Plate Farm =

Coordinates: 42.389081°N 71.450776°W

Home Plate Farm was located on 558 Dutton Road in Sudbury, Massachusetts. It was owned by baseball legend Babe Ruth and his first wife Helen from 1922 to 1926. Ruth had previously rented a modest cottage on Willis Pond while still with the Red Sox. That is where a supposed piano sinking took place. A few versions have Ruth tossing the piano into the pond, but more likely that he and friends pushed it out onto the ice for a daytime party, and then left it there rather than try to push it back up the hill to the cabin.

An urban legend concerning the site revolves around a teenaged boy, Lee Gavin, who was struck by a batted ball during an August 31, 2004 baseball game at Fenway Park between the Boston Red Sox and the Los Angeles Angels. Gavin lived at the Home Plate Farm site, and this incident is supposed to have presaged the Red Sox winning the World Series later in 2004, thus ending the Curse of the Bambino. The Red Sox won the game 10-7 while the New York Yankees lost 22–0 to the Cleveland Indians on the same night.
