= Curse of the Bambino =

Boston Red Sox championship drought, 1918–2004

External media

Images
- Picture of the graffitied "reverse curve" road sign
- Removal of the sign (then re-graffitied to read "reversed the curse") by a crew including Governor Mitt Romney, following Boston's 2004 World Series victory.
- Picture of the sign on a duck boat (20th Anniversary in 2024)

Video
- Memories of a Curse | DCR Preserves Red Sox History

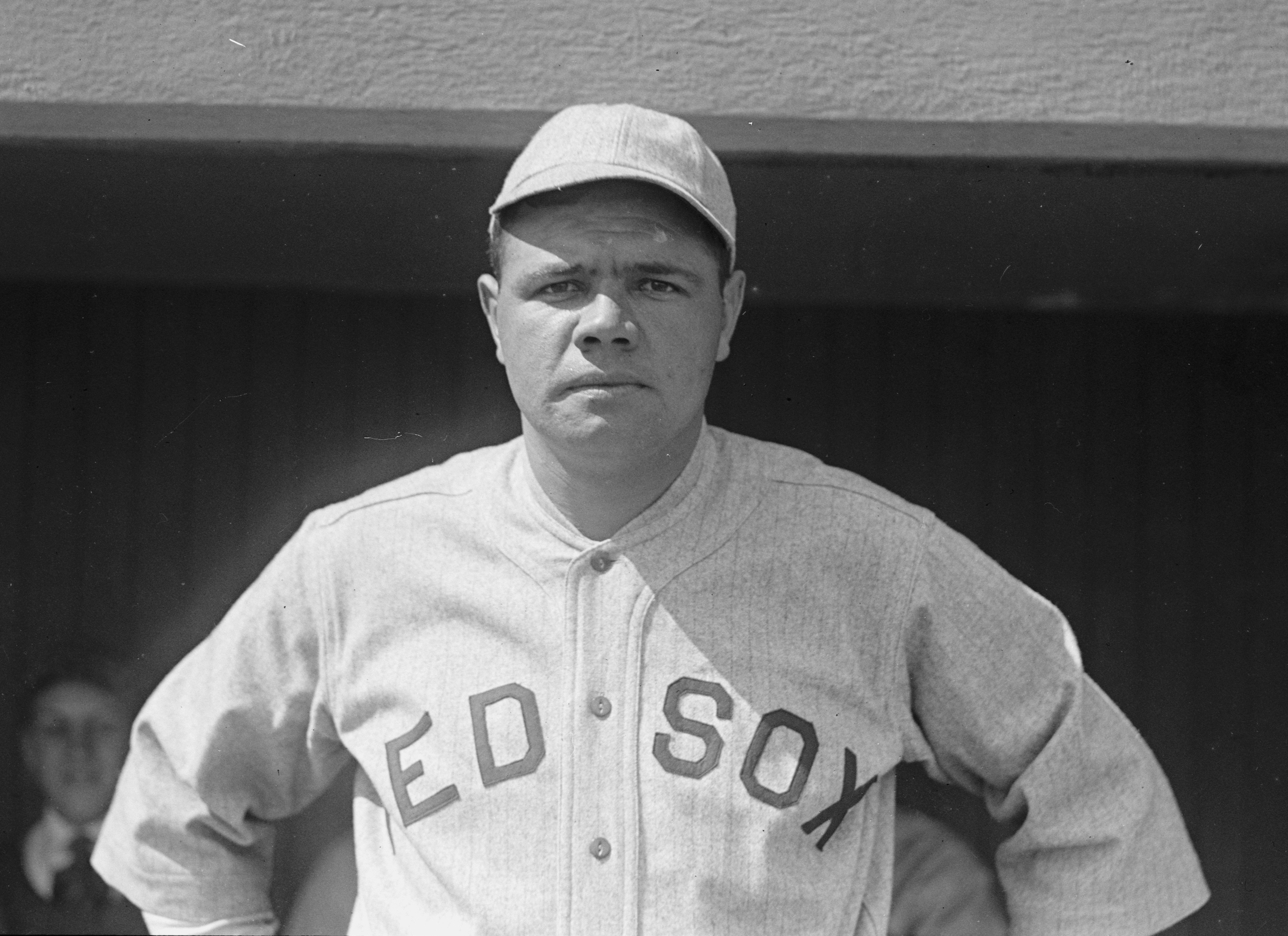
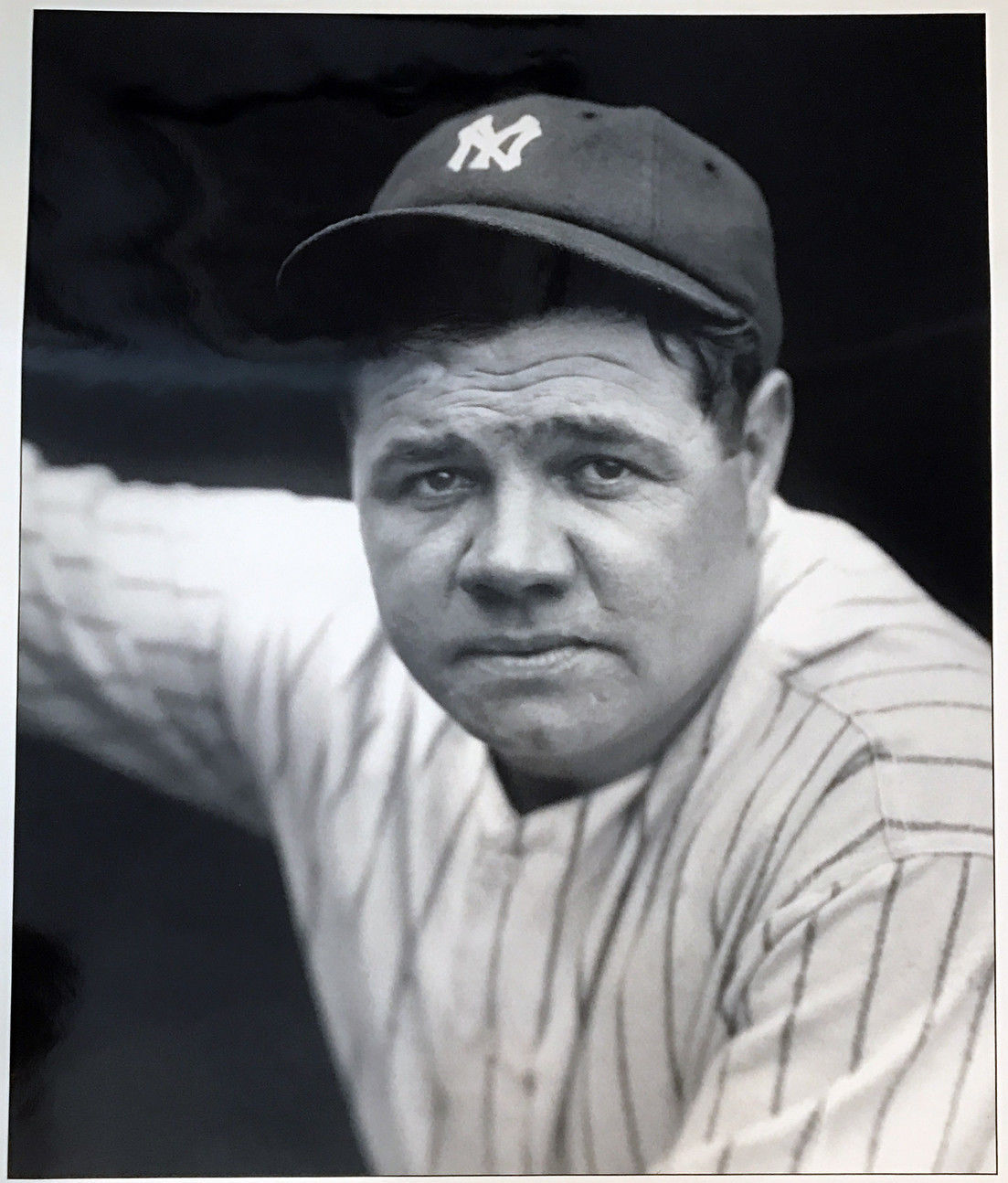
Babe Ruth's sale from Boston to New York after the 1919 season became the basis for the "Curse of the Bambino".

The Curse of the Bambino was a superstitious sports curse in Major League Baseball (MLB) derived from the 86-year championship drought of the Boston Red Sox between 1918 and 2004. The superstition was named after Babe Ruth, colloquially known as "The Bambino", who played for the Red Sox until his contract was sold to the New York Yankees in 1920. While some fans took the curse seriously, most used the expression in a tongue-in-cheek manner.

Prior to the drought, the Red Sox had been one of the most successful professional baseball franchises. They won five of the first fifteen World Series titles, including the first in 1903, more than any other MLB team at the time. During this period, Ruth was a contributor to the Red Sox's three championships in 1915, 1916, and 1918. Following the sale of Ruth, however, the once lackluster Yankees became one of the most dominant professional sports franchises in North America, winning more than twice as many World Series titles as any other MLB team. The curse became a focal point of the Red Sox–Yankees rivalry over the years.

The "curse" ended when the Red Sox won the 2004 World Series. The Red Sox's championship was prefaced by them overcoming a 3–0 deficit against the Yankees in the 2004 American League Championship Series (ALCS), the first and, as of 2026, only time an MLB team won a best-of-seven playoff series after losing the first three games.

The curse had been such a part of Boston culture that when a "reverse curve" road sign on Longfellow Bridge over the city's Storrow Drive was graffitied to read "Reverse The Curse", officials left it in place until the Red Sox won the 2004 World Series. After the World Series that year, the road sign was edited to read "Reversed Curse" in celebration before its removal. On the 20th anniversary of their World Series win, the sign was displayed on a duck boat during the Red Sox 2024 home opener parade.

== Lore ==
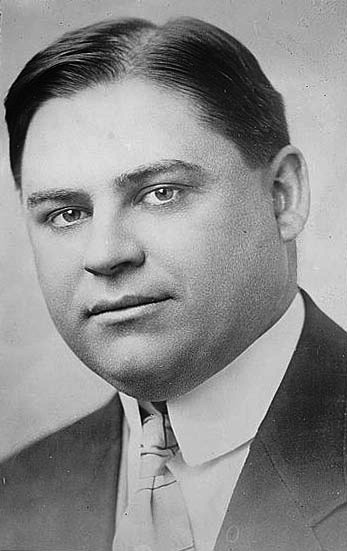
Harry Frazee sold Babe Ruth to the Yankees

Although the selling of Ruth has often been noted as the beginning of the Red Sox's decline, the term "curse of the Bambino" was not in common use until the publication of the book The Curse of the Bambino by Dan Shaughnessy in 1990. It became a key part of Red Sox lore in the media thereafter, and Shaughnessy's book became required reading in some high school English classes in New England.

The curse first appears at the end of chapter two in a letter to Mr. Shaughnessy from Rev. Darrell Berger of the First Parish Unitarian Church in Scituate, Massachusetts. As an avid fan and occasional baseball writer and broadcaster whose congregation dates from Puritan times, he was in a unique position to place the frustration of Red Sox fans into historical prospective. He replies to Mr. Shaughnessy's inquiry as to why "curse" is an applicable term, citing The House of the Seven Gables, a tale of how one's continuing ill fortune can be spun into a curse.

Rev. Berger writes

In both cases you have a cursed family because of evil that had been done and it's passed down several generations later. I think of the selling of Ruth as the sin that cannot be atoned for. There hasn't been a savior that can come along and make that atonement. The Sox over and over again keep paying for that sin. Frazee sins against Sox fans by selling Ruth. This severs trust between fans and ownership that has never healed. A curse is also merely a folkwise way of explaining the unexplainable, but who wants to leave it at that? So is the Old Testament. The key for the curse to be lifted is acknowledgement that both sin and curse exist and why, in the same way an alcoholic or any dysfunctional relationship must be named before it can heal. The great danger of a curse is that the closer it gets to being overcome, the greater the anxiety becomes. Anxiety causes bad things to happen and the curse continues.

Although the title drought dated back to 1918, the sale of Ruth to the Yankees was completed January 3, 1920. In standard curse lore, Red Sox owner and theatrical producer Harry Frazee used the proceeds from the sale to finance the production of a Broadway musical, usually said to be No, No, Nanette. In fact, Frazee backed many productions before and after Ruth's sale, and No, No, Nanette did not see its first performance until five years after the Ruth sale and two years after Frazee sold the Red Sox. In 1921, Red Sox manager Ed Barrow left to take over as general manager of the Yankees. Other Red Sox players were also later sold or traded to the Yankees.

Neither the lore, nor the debunking of it, entirely tells the story. As Leigh Montville wrote in The Big Bam: The Life and Times of Babe Ruth, the production No, No, Nanette had originated as a non-musical stage play called My Lady Friends, which opened on Broadway in December 1919. That play had, indeed, been financed as a direct result of the Ruth deal. Various researchers, including Montville and Shaughnessy, have pointed out that Frazee had close ties to the Yankees owners, and that many of the player deals, as well as the mortgage deal for Fenway Park itself, had to do with financing his plays.

Yankee fans taunted the Red Sox with chants of "1918!" one weekend in September 1990. The demeaning chant echoed at Yankee Stadium each time the Red Sox were there. Yankees fans also taunted the Red Sox with signs saying "1918!", "CURSE OF THE BAMBINO", pictures of Babe Ruth, and wearing "1918!" T-shirts each time they were at the stadium. The chant was only heard at Yankee Stadium.

== Reportedly cursed results ==
Before Babe Ruth left Boston, the Red Sox had won five of the first fifteen World Series, with Ruth pitching for the 1916 and 1918 championship teams (he was with the Red Sox for the 1915 World Series, but manager Bill Carrigan used him only once, as a pinch-hitter, and he did not pitch). The Yankees had not played in any World Series up to that time. In the 84 years after the sale, the Yankees played in 39 World Series, winning 26 of them, twice as many as any other team in Major League Baseball. Meanwhile, over the same time span, the Red Sox played in only four World Series and lost each in seven games.

Even losses that occurred many years before the first mention of the supposed curse, in 1986, have been attributed to it. Some of these instances are listed below:

- In 1946, the Red Sox appeared in their first World Series since the sale of Babe Ruth and were favored to beat the St. Louis Cardinals. The series went to Game 7 at Sportsman's Park in St. Louis. In the bottom of the eighth inning, with the score tied at 3–3, the Cardinals had Enos Slaughter on first base and Harry Walker at the plate. On a hit and run, Walker hit a double to very short left-center field. Slaughter ran through the third base coach's stop sign and beat Boston shortstop Johnny Pesky's relay throw to home plate. Some say Pesky hesitated on the throw, allowing Slaughter to score, but Pesky always denied this charge. Film footage is inconclusive, except that it shows Pesky in bright sunlight and Slaughter in shadow. Boston star Ted Williams, playing with an injury, was largely ineffective at the plate in his only World Series.
- In 1948, the Red Sox finished the regular season tied for first place, only to lose the pennant to the Cleveland Indians in the major leagues' first-ever one-game playoff. Cleveland would go on to win the World Series.
- In 1949, the Red Sox needed to win just one of the last two games of the season to win the pennant, but lost both games to the Yankees, who won a record five consecutive World Series from 1949 to 1953.
- In 1967, the Red Sox surprisingly reversed the awful results of the 1966 season by winning the American League pennant on the last weekend of the regular season. In the World Series, they once again faced the Cardinals, and just as in 1946, the Series went to Game 7, which St. Louis won, 7–2, behind their best pitcher Bob Gibson; Gibson defeated Boston ace Jim Lonborg, who was pitching on short rest and was ineffective. Gibson even hit a home run against Lonborg in the game.
- In 1972, the Red Sox ended the regular season with a three-game series against the Detroit Tigers, over whom they held a half-game lead in the American League East. Detroit won two of the three games to capture the division by half a game. (Due to the players' strike at the beginning of the season and the decision of Commissioner Bowie Kuhn not to reschedule any strike-cancelled games, the Tigers ended up playing and winning one more game than the Red Sox, finishing with a 86–70 record to Boston's 85–70.)
- In 1975, the Red Sox won the pennant and met the dynastic Cincinnati Reds in the World Series. The Red Sox won Game 6 on a walk-off home run by catcher Carlton Fisk, setting the stage for the deciding Game 7. Boston took a quick 3–0 lead and were seven outs away from the championship, but the Reds tied the game. In the top of the ninth, the Reds brought in the go-ahead run on a Joe Morgan single that scored Ken Griffey, Sr., winning what is regarded as one of the greatest World Series ever played.
- In 1978, the Red Sox held a 14-game lead in the American League East over the Yankees on July 18. However, the Yankees subsequently caught fire, eventually tying Boston atop the standings on September 10 after sweeping a four-game series at Fenway Park, an event known to Red Sox fans as the "Boston Massacre." Six days later, the Yankees held a 3 1/2 game lead over the Red Sox, but the Sox won 12 of their next 14 games to overcome that deficit and force a one-game playoff on October 2 at Fenway Park. The memorable moment of the game came when light-hitting Yankee shortstop Bucky Dent cracked a three-run home run in the seventh inning that hit the top of the left field wall (the Green Monster) and skipped out of the park, giving New York a 3–2 lead. The Yankees held on to win the playoff game, 5–4, eventually winning the World Series.
- In Game 6 of the 1986 World Series against the New York Mets, Boston (leading the series three games to two) took a 5–3 lead in the top of the 10th inning. Red Sox reliever Calvin Schiraldi retired the first two batters, putting the team within one out (and shortly within one strike) of winning the World Series. However, the Mets scored three runs, tying the game on a wild pitch from Bob Stanley and winning it when Boston first baseman Bill Buckner allowed a ground ball hit by the Mets' Mookie Wilson to roll through his legs, scoring Ray Knight from second base. In Game 7, the Red Sox took an early 3–0 lead, only to lose, 8–5. The collapses in the last two games prompted The New York Times columnist George Vecsey to write articles describing the Red Sox as cursed.
- In 1988 and 1990, the Red Sox advanced to the American League Championship Series (ALCS), only to suffer four-game sweeps both times at the hands of the Oakland Athletics. They were also swept by the Cleveland Indians in the 1995 American League Division Series (ALDS) in three games (extending their postseason losing streak to a major-league record 13 games), lost again to the Indians in the 1998 ALDS three games to one, and were defeated by the eventual World Series-champion Yankees four games to one in the 1999 ALCS.
- In 2003, the Red Sox were playing the Yankees in Game 7 of the ALCS. Boston held a 5–2 lead in the eighth inning, and manager Grady Little opted to stay with starting pitcher Pedro Martínez rather than go to the bullpen. New York rallied against the tired Martínez, scoring three runs on a single and three doubles to tie the game. In the bottom of the 11th inning, future Yankees manager Aaron Boone launched a walk-off solo home run against knuckleballing Boston starter Tim Wakefield (pitching in relief) to win the game and the pennant for the Yankees, who would go on to lose to the Florida Marlins 4 games to 2 in the World Series.

== Attempts to break the curse ==
Red Sox fans attempted various methods over the years to exorcise their famous curse. These included placing a Boston cap atop Mount Everest and burning a Yankees cap at its base camp and finding a piano owned by Ruth that he had supposedly pushed into a pond near his Sudbury, Massachusetts farm, Home Plate Farm.

In 1976, Laurie Cabot was brought in to end a 10-game losing streak. While the losing streak ended, the Curse of the Bambino did not.

In Ken Burns's 1994 documentary Baseball, former Red Sox pitcher Bill Lee suggested that the Red Sox should exhume the body of Babe Ruth, transport it back to Fenway and publicly apologize for trading Ruth to the Yankees.

Some declared the curse broken during a game on August 31, 2004, when a foul ball hit by Manny Ramírez flew into Section 9, Box 95, Row AA and struck a boy's face, knocking two of his teeth out. Sixteen-year-old Lee Gavin, a Boston fan whose favorite player was Ramirez, lived on the Sudbury farm owned by Ruth. That same day, the Yankees suffered their worst loss in team history, a 22–0 clobbering at home against the Cleveland Indians.

Some fans also cite a comedy curse-breaking ceremony performed by musician Jimmy Buffett and his warm-up team (one dressed as Ruth and one dressed as a witch doctor) at a Fenway concert in September 2004. Just after being traded to the Red Sox, Curt Schilling appeared in an advertisement for the Ford F-150 pickup truck hitchhiking with a sign indicating he was going to Boston. When picked up, he said that he had "an 86-year-old curse" to break.

== End of the curse ==
In 2004, the Red Sox once again met the Yankees in the American League Championship Series. The Red Sox lost the first three games, including losing Game 3 at Fenway by the lopsided score of 19–8.

The Red Sox trailed 4–3 in the bottom of the ninth inning of Game 4. But the team tied the game with a walk by Kevin Millar and a stolen base by pinch-runner Dave Roberts, followed by an RBI single against Yankee closer Mariano Rivera by third baseman Bill Mueller, and won on a two-run home run in the 12th inning by David Ortiz. The Red Sox won the next three games to become the first and only MLB team to win a seven-game postseason series after losing the first three games.

The Red Sox then faced the St. Louis Cardinals, the team to whom they had lost in 1946 and 1967, and led throughout the series, winning in a four-game sweep. Cardinals shortstop Édgar Rentería, who wore the same number as Ruth (3), was the final out of the series, a ground ball back to pitcher Keith Foulke. Fox commentator Joe Buck famously called the grounder with: "Back to Foulke. Red Sox fans have longed to hear it: The Boston Red Sox are World Champions!"

== In popular culture ==
=== Non-fiction works ===
- The 2004 Red Sox season was the subject of several non-fiction books, including Faithful: Boston Red Sox Fans Chronicle the Historic 2004 Season, whose authors Stewart O'Nan and Stephen King decided to write the book before the season began, and Reversing the Curse by Dan Shaughnessy of The Boston Globe.
- In the fall of 2003, HBO produced the Emmy Award-winning documentary called The Curse of the Bambino, directed by filmmaker George Roy. It featured commentary from native Boston celebrities such as Denis Leary, narrated by Ben Affleck. After the 2004 World Series, the ending of the documentary was re-filmed with a number of the same celebrities and it was retitled Reverse of the Curse of the Bambino, narrated by Liev Schreiber. Schreiber's character was also introduced reading a copy of the book in the 2015 film Spotlight.

=== Fiction ===
- The British memoir Fever Pitch, about author Nick Hornby's obsession with the Arsenal FC English soccer team, was adapted into an American film of the same name by the Farrelly brothers. The American adaptation was about an obsessive Red Sox fan. It was made during the 2004 World Series, which forced the filmmakers to rework the story; the Red Sox were not originally supposed to make it to the World Series.
- In the movie 50 First Dates, Adam Sandler's character Henry Roth reminds his girlfriend about what happened in 2003 including a screen capture showing the Red Sox winning the World Series, until the next clip shows the title 'just kidding'. The movie was released in February 2004.
- On the television show Lost, Jack and his father Christian often use the phrase "That's why the Sox will never win the damn series" to describe fate. In season 3, Ben shows the end of the 2004 game to try to convince Jack that the Others have contact with the outside world.
- In the movie Moneyball, Brad Pitt's character Billy Beane talks to the Boston Red Sox's owner about a job as GM after taking the Oakland A's to a 20-game winning streak. When the Red Sox's owner asks Billy Beane why he returned his call, he says because he wants to help them end the Curse of the Bambino.
- An episode of the children's TV series Arthur titled "The Curse of the Grebes" has Elwood City's baseball team losing two of its games in the world championship series due to events based directly on Bucky Dent's homer and Bill Buckner's error. The episode states that the team had not won a championship in 87 years and that their opponents, the Crown City Kings, had won 25 since then. Johnny Damon, Edgar Renteria, and Mike Timlin all voice caricatures of themselves.
- In the opening sequence for season 5 of the For All Mankind TV Show, the Curse of the Bambino was referenced on a magazine cover with the title "The Curse of the Bambino Continues".

=== Music ===
- The 2004 Dropkick Murphys song "Tessie" was released as a single in June 2004, and referenced the singing of the 1903 song of the same title which had been sung by the Royal Rooters when the Boston Americans won the 1903 World Series. The song intended to "bring back the spirit of the Royal Rooters and put the Red Sox back on top", which would break the curse of the Bambino, in the 2004 Major League pennant race. Their version became the official song of the Boston Red Sox 2004 World Series run, and was included on the Dropkick Murphys 2005 album The Warrior's Code with added audio of the WEEI broadcast of the last play of the 2004 World Series. The song is still played at Red Sox games.
- The Ben Harper song "Get It Like You Like It" from his 2006 album Both Sides of the Gun includes the lines "In 1918 the Great Bambino kicked a piano into Willis Pond. But Johnny Damon swung his bat, grand slam, that was that. An 86-year curse is gone."
- James Taylor "Angels of Fenway" (Album – Before This World) released June 15, 2015. Taylor sings "86 summers gone by. Bambino put a hex on the Bean. We were living on a tear and a sigh. In the shadow of the Bronx machine..."

=== Other ===
- At WrestleMania XIV held in Boston in 1998, guest ring announcer Pete Rose taunted the Boston crowd about the curse (Rose was on the Cincinnati Reds team that beat Boston in the 1975 World Series) before he was tombstoned by Kane.
- After New York's defeat, the Curse was poked fun at during the Weekend Update segment of Saturday Night Live, when the ghost of Babe Ruth explains that he left during Game Four with the ghosts of Mickey Mantle and Rodney Dangerfield to go drinking.

=== Video games ===
- The curse is referenced in Valve's Team Fortress 2, with an achievement named "A Year To Remember". It can be unlocked by obtaining 2,004 lifetime kills with the Scout, who is himself a Boston native and baseball enthusiast.
- In mobile game "Pinball Deluxe Reloaded" on one of the tables there is a mission of lifting curses, one of which is named "Curse of the Bambino".

== See also ==
- Baseball superstition
- Sports-related curses
- Curse of the Billy Goat
- Curse of Billy Penn
- Curse of Shoeless Joe
- Curse of the Colonel
