= Golden age of baseball =

Period in the history of Major League Baseball, c. 1920 – 1960

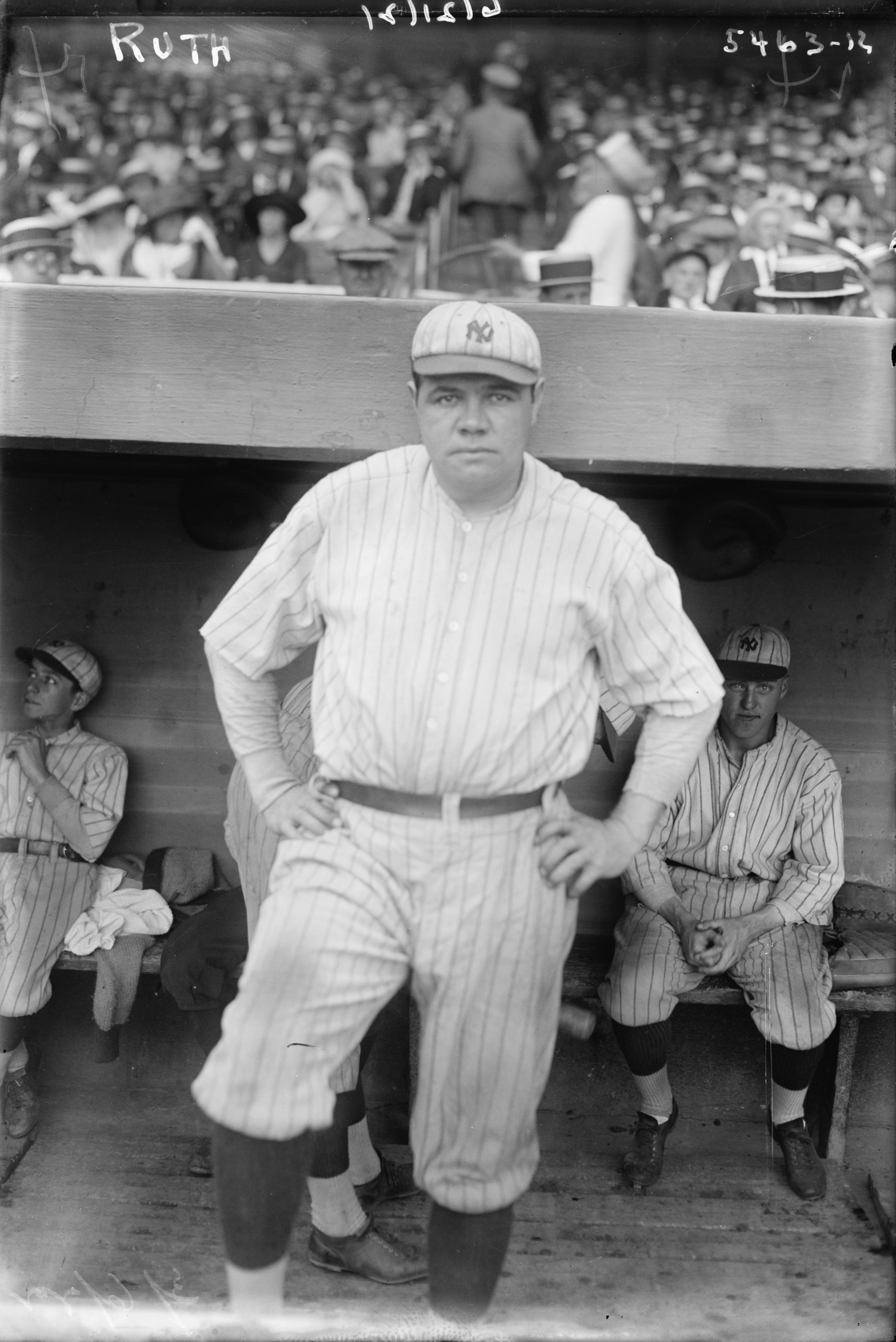
Babe Ruth was the most dominant player in the golden age of baseball.

The golden age of baseball, or sometimes the golden era, describes the period in Major League Baseball (MLB) from the end of the dead-ball era until the modern era—roughly, from 1920 to sometime after World War II.

The exact years are debated. MLB, for example, considers the golden age to have ended with World War II. Others consider the golden age to have ended in 1951, when the first baseball game was broadcast in color, or in the mid-1960s, when all baseball games were broadcast in color.

== Players ==
The golden age was dominated by stars such as Lou Gehrig, Ted Williams, Hank Greenberg, Rogers Hornsby and especially Babe Ruth, whose called shot was one of the defining moments of the era. Another defining moment of the golden era was Gabby Hartnett's Homer in the Gloamin'. By 1919, when Ruth hit a then-league record 29 home runs, a spectacular feat at that time, the dead-ball era had officially come to an end, ushering in the Live-ball era.

While the most popular icons of the golden era are hitters, and Ruth is generally thought of as one of the premier sports icons in history, there were also several pitchers who dominated hitters on the mound during that same time, and two of the best of them were Lefty Grove and Dizzy Dean, both of whom won over 30 games in the early 1930s. Further, some of the most popular players in the Negro National League included names such as Oscar Charleston, Josh Gibson, and Mule Suttles. Later in the era, players such as Willie Mays, Mickey Mantle, Ernie Banks, and pitchers Bob Gibson and Warren Spahn, among others, established themselves as Hall of Famers and ultimately played into the late 1960s and 1970s, providing a bridge between the golden age and the current era.

== Teams ==
From a team perspective, the golden age of baseball (using the years 1918-1964 as a guideline) was dominated by the New York Yankees, who won 29 American League pennants and 20 of the Franchise’s 27 World Series titles between 1918 and 1964. Their closest competition came from the Philadelphia Athletics who won nine pennants and the Detroit Tigers who won eight.

In the National League, dominance was shared by the St. Louis Cardinals, Brooklyn Dodgers and New York Giants, each of whom won nine pennants.

Teams travelled primarily by train during the period, occasionally stopping off at saloons and speakeasies in between games, mingling with fans and adding to the mystique of the era, as this is unlikely to happen often today. Many players also worked other "primary" jobs in the offseason, and others stepped away in the middle of their careers to serve in the military.

Entire franchises were worth hundreds of thousands of dollars, at the time, with the Cleveland Indians becoming the first team to be sold for over $1,000,000 when Bob Hope and Bill Veeck bought the club for $1.6 million.

== Baseball during the Great Depression ==
The Wall Street crash of 1929 ushered in the Great Depression, affecting baseball, along with many other businesses, organizations, and families. Ticket sales plunged 40%, jeopardizing the popularity and prosperity of the sport. Many players lost their jobs, including Babe Ruth. Player salaries dropped about 20% on average, and did not return for years.

== Color line in the golden age ==
By the beginning of the 20th century, nearly all black Americans had been shut out from playing any sort of baseball with white Americans, so they formed a separate league. In the early 1900s the Negro National League grew in popularity, despite the fact that white booking agents often had control over when and where the teams would be able to play or practice. The NNL came to an end due to the financial burdens of the Great Depression, but rearose soon after as the Negro American League.

In 1947, Jackie Robinson, who had played for the Kansas City Monarchs of the NAL, became the first African American to be integrated into the all-white world of baseball. Brooklyn Dodgers president Branch Rickey tapped Robinson to break the baseball color line. Robinson was still a target of many racist comments and slurs during his time in the majors. Robinson was inducted into the Baseball Hall of Fame in 1962.

== Women in baseball ==
The first women's baseball game where girls were paid and prospectors paid admission took place in Illinois in 1875. However, many were unimpressed with the women's abilities while playing baseball. During this time, many Americans didn't see women as being athletes or as major participants in sports. Even in the early 1900s, people opposed women in all sports because they were afraid that sports would ultimately destroy women's femininity. American perspectives on women at this time were that they were meant to be viewed as perfect and feminine. Many thought that for a woman to participate in physical activities and sports would make them become more masculine.

Women's baseball began to be taken more seriously at the start of World War II. Philip K. Wrigley, the owner of the Chicago Cubs, decided to invest in an all-women's baseball league that went by the AAGPBL (All-American Girls Professional Baseball League) in 1943. Wrigley was worried about losing a good number of male ball players due to the war, he believed that creating a women's league would keep the flow of money coming in from the ball parks.

Despite the changing views of Americans towards what women should and should not be able to do in sports, they were still held to a higher caliber of femininity and perfection at this time. Women that played the sport were required to take classes on how to be feminine after practices and games, and were often looked down upon for demonstrating any masculine traits. Nonetheless, this league still opened up opportunities for future women in sports.
