= Yvonne Suhor =

American actress

- Born: Yvonne Theresa Suhor; November 29, 1961; New Orleans, Louisiana, U.S.
- Died: September 27, 2018 (aged 56); Winter Park, Florida, U.S.
- Education: Illinois State University (BA); University of Southern California (MFA)
- Spouse: Simon Needham (m. 2001)

Yvonne Theresa Suhor (November 29, 1961 – September 27, 2018) was an American actress and acting instructor.

== Early life and education ==
Suhor was born in New Orleans, Louisiana. She graduated from Illinois State University in 1985, and later received her MFA from the University of Southern California.

== Career ==
Suhor appeared in a number of movies and TV series, most notably as Cicely in an Emmy Award-winning episode of Northern Exposure and as series regular Louise McCloud for three seasons on The Young Riders. She also guest-starred on Brooklyn Bridge (in a recurring role), Murder, She Wrote, Star Trek: Voyager, Renegade, and Sheena. Suhor's theatre credits included Steppenwolf's The Grapes of Wrath and Lydie Breeze, and she was a two-time Jeff Award nominee.

Suhor also ran her own acting school, Art's Sake Film Acting Studio in Orlando, Florida, teaching film acting based on the Meisner technique.

== Personal life ==
Suhor died on September 27, 2018, after a 10-month illness with pancreatic cancer. She was married to actor Simon Needham.

== Filmography ==
=== Television ===
Year	Title	Role	Notes
1987	Sable	Tara Mason / Emily Wacker	Episode: "Copycat"
1989–1991	The Young Riders	Louise McCloud	67 episodes
1991	Dillinger	Jacqueline	Television film
1991	Babe Ruth	Helen Woodford Ruth	Television film
1992	Northern Exposure	Cicely	Episode: "Cicely"
1992, 1993	Brooklyn Bridge	Colleen	2 episodes
1993	Murder, She Wrote	Marian King	Episode: "Love's Deadly Desire"
1993, 1995	Renegade	Marian Kirby / Kim McClain	2 episodes
1995	Star Trek: Voyager	Eudana	Episode: "Prime Factors"
2000	Sheena	Stanton	Episode: "Lost Boy"
2018	Lodge 49	Melinda	Episode: "Full Fathom Five"
