= Helen Woodford Ruth =

First wife of Babe Ruth (1897–1929)

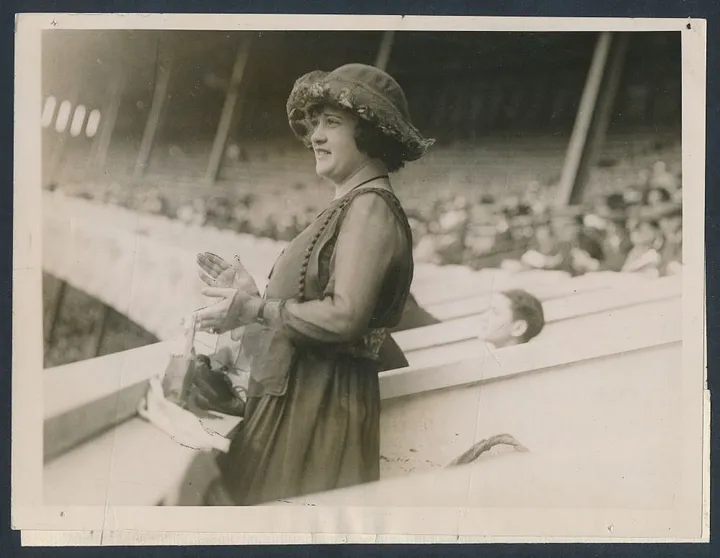
- Helen Woodford Ruth at the ballpark in 1916
- Born: October 20, 1897
- Died: January 11, 1929 (aged 31); Watertown, Massachusetts
- Spouse: Babe Ruth (m. 1914–1929)

Helen Woodford Ruth (October 20, 1897 – January 11, 1929) was the first wife of American baseball player Babe Ruth and the adoptive mother of his daughter Dorothy. Ruth died in a house fire in 1929, the circumstances of which sparked controversy and conspiracy theories among her family that Babe Ruth played a role in her death.

== Marriage to Babe Ruth ==
Woodford, a native of South Boston, was sixteen when she met her future husband. According to Ruth, then nineteen, he met his future wife on the day he arrived in Boston on July 11, 1914, for his Major League debut with the Boston Red Sox. At the time, Helen was a waitress at Landers Coffee Shop, and Ruth said she served him when he had breakfast there.

Ruth soon began to court Woodford and eventually proposed to her during a coffee shop visit a few months after their first meeting. Woodford accepted his proposal. Once the season concluded, Helen married Ruth on October 14, 1914, at St. Paul's Catholic Church in Ellicott City, Maryland.

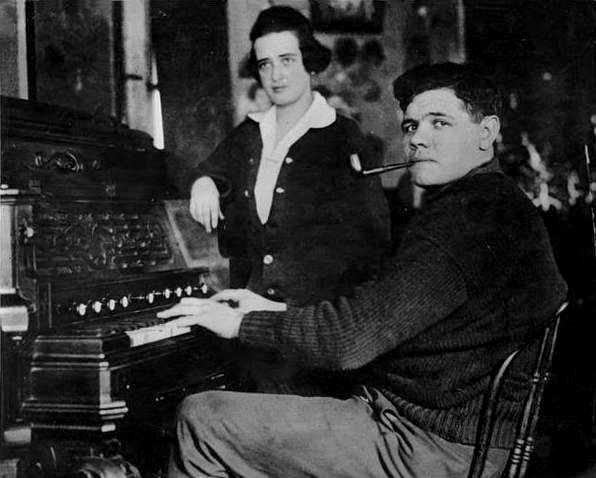
Helen and Babe Ruth

In 1916, they bought an eighty-acre farm out in Sudbury, Massachusetts, twenty miles west of Boston and now called Home Plate Farm. By that time, their marriage had begun to fall apart due to Ruth's infidelities.

In 1921, the couple adopted a daughter, Dorothy (1921–1989). (Note: In her autobiography My Dad, the Babe, Dorothy Ruth claimed she was the biological daughter of Babe Ruth with Juanita Jennings, his mistress, and neither Helen nor Ruth's second wife Claire knew.) Helen reportedly lost four pregnancies before they adopted their daughter.

As Ruth's fame grew, Helen began hearing more about his extramarital affairs and felt neglected. She began to have nervous breakdowns, for which she was hospitalized numerous times. Whenever she asked him to let her accompany him to spring training, he would rudely brush her off and they would often fight. The final straw was when Ruth fell in love with his secretary Claire Hodgson, whom he met in 1923. However, because they were Catholic, the pair never divorced.

Babe and Helen finally separated in 1925. Other than occasionally appearing in public as a couple, the last time being during the 1926 World Series, they lived separate lives for the remainder of their marriage.

== Death ==
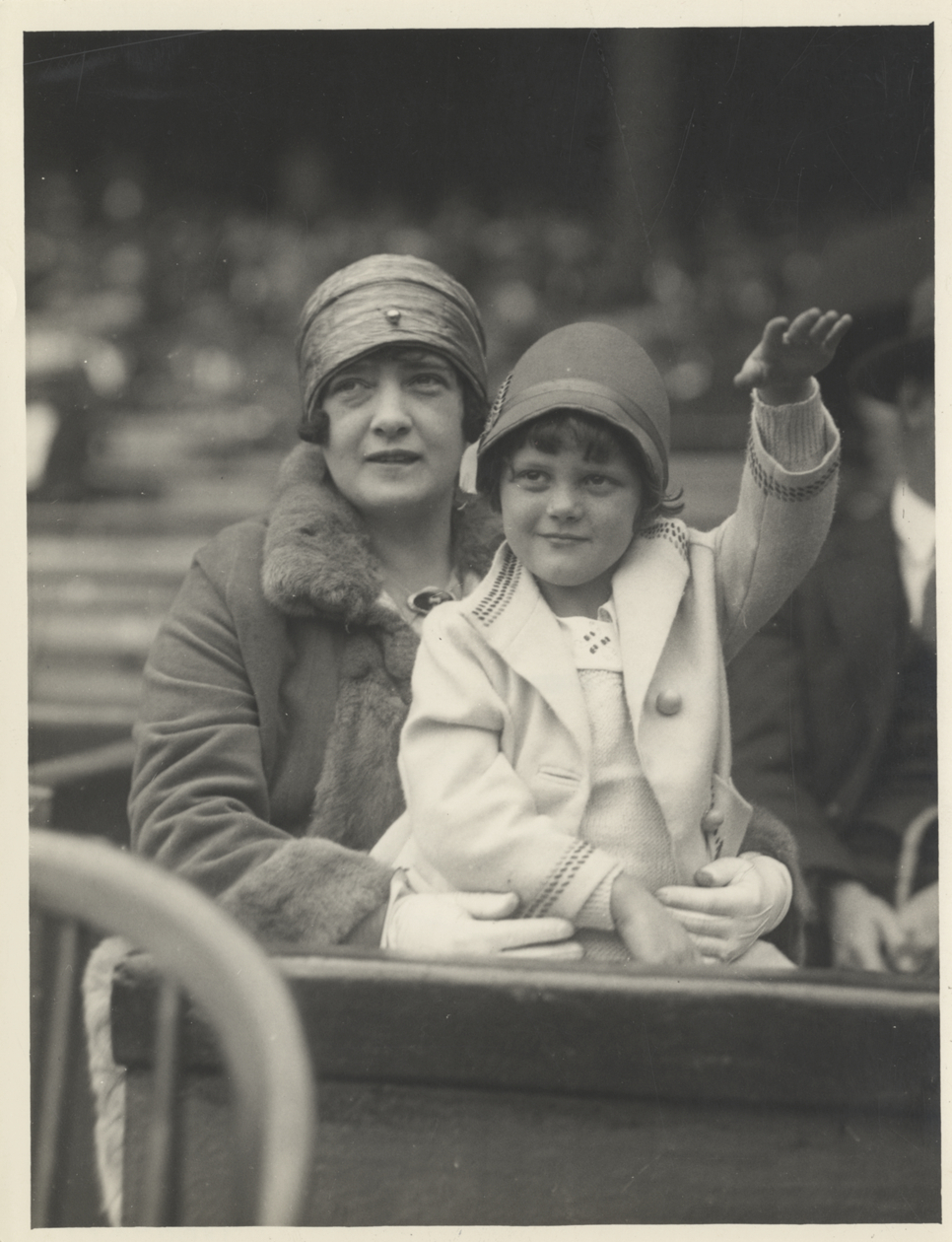
Helen with her daughter Dorothy, c. 1925

At some point after her separation, Ruth met Edward Kinder, a dentist, when she came to work for him as a housekeeper. The pair began a relationship and she soon moved in with him at his home in Watertown, Massachusetts. There, they lived under the guise of a married couple, and she went under the name "Mrs. Helen Kinder".

On January 10, a fire broke out in the living room of the Watertown house. Ruth was alone at her home, and her partner was away at the Boston Garden. She was discovered on the floor of her bedroom by Captain John Kelly of the Watertown Fire Department and was taken to her neighbor's home, where she died of her injuries twelve hours later. Kinder arrived a few hours before she died and was with her.

The cause of the fire was reported by the Watertown Sun as "defective wiring and overloading of wires" in the living room. Initially, the Boston Post reported Ruth's death as that of the wife of a "prominent Watertown dentist" and her funeral was arranged under the name "Helen Kinder". However, an anonymous caller told the police of her real identity, and her death became a nationwide story.

Ruth's husband was in New York City when he was informed of his wife's death. Along with Helen's sisters, Nora and Catherine Woodford, he went to Boston to confirm that the body was that of his wife. He told reporters immediately afterward; he said: "Boys, I'm in a terrible fix. The shock has been a very great one to me. Please let my wife alone. Let her stay dead. That's all I've got to say." Afterwards, he said: "I haven't lived with my wife for three years. In that period I have seen her only a few times. I have done everything to comply with her wishes. Her death is a great shock to me. That's all I have to say."

After the fire and Helen's death, Edward Kinder was interviewed by the Watertown Police for four hours, admitting that he and Helen had never been married. He also told them that Ruth knew where Helen was staying.

Helen Ruth's funeral services were held on January 17. Babe Ruth attended the funeral and reportedly was silent except when "he burst into sobs". She was buried at the Calvary Cemetery in Mattapan, Massachusetts.

In her will, she left her estate to her daughter Dorothy, which was valued at $50,000. She also left $5 each to her husband, mother, and her siblings (four brothers and three sisters).

=== Controversy ===
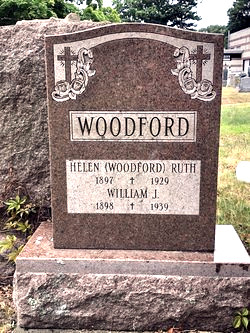
Gravesite of Helen Woodford Ruth–and her brother William–in Mattapan, Massachusetts

In the immediate aftermath, Helen Ruth's family refused to accept that the fire had been accidental, with her brother Thomas asking, "What is there to prove the house wasn't fired? What is there to prove that she wasn't murdered?" This led to the District Attorney General Robert T. Bushnell to release a statement in the Boston Globe: "The case is closed as far as this office is concerned, and, I hope, for the sake of the unfortunate woman who cannot speak for herself, that it is closed as far as anyone is concerned."

A second autopsy was performed by Suffolk County Medical Examiner George B. McGrath, who confirmed the reports of the initial autopsy. The case was also examined by Waltham District Court Judge Michael J. Connolly who concluded: "On all of the evidence I find that Helen W. Ruth met death through suffocation and burns between 6:30 and 11 p.m. I find no unlawful act or criminal negligence on the part of anyone contribute to her death."

According to Helen's family, Helen lived in fear of her husband. Helen's niece, Patricia Grace said: "Aunt Helen was in fear for her life because Babe Ruth wanted a divorce because he was carrying on with women. Of course, we were a Catholic family and she would not divorce. He was trying to get rid of her. He had these hoodlums or what have you. Those are the stories my mother told me."

This claim is contradicted by both the official reports and the fact that Ruth made regular payments to Helen and was visibly distraught by her death. Nevertheless, three months after Helen's death, Ruth married his longtime mistress Claire Merrit Hodgson.

== Media portrayal ==
Woodford Ruth was portrayed by actress Trini Alvarado in the 1992 film The Babe.
