= The Age of Insects =

1990 film by Eric Marciano

- Directed by: Eric Marciano (Marano)
- Starring: Jack Ramey; Lisa Zane; K.C. Townshend
- Release date: 1990
- Country: United States

The Age of Insects is a 1990 American horror comedy film directed by Eric Marciano (Marano), his first feature film, and co-written by him, Club 57 alumnus Andy Rees, and Peter Christian Hall. It was filmed from 1983 to 1990 in New York City, and one of low budget films utilizing Super 8, 16 mm, 35mm film, Hi8, 3/4" and BetaCam video formats. It stars Jack Ramey, Lisa Zane, K.C. Townshend, Louis Homyak, Dallas Munroe, Heather Woodbury, and David Ilku. In 2007 a nonfiction account of the making of the film was published in the oral history Gods in Spandex: A Survivors' Account of 80's Cinema Obscura edited by Suzanne Donahue and Mikael Sovijarvi. (This was a follow-up to the author's earlier Gods in Polyester.)

== Premise ==
Influenced by B-movies and bad television shows from the 1950s and 1960s, and portraying the East Village of the early 1980s, it is an account of a mad doctor's hallucinogenic treatments for bad boys.

== Reviews ==
"Coupled with the extensive use of creepy-crawly insect footage and computerized sexual imagery, director Marciano's darkly comic vision is sublime fun."—David E. Williams, Film Threat, April 1992

"This movie is the Citizen Kane of underground films—intelligent, funny, engrossing."—Joe Bob Briggs, January 24, 1994
