= Babe Ruth League =

International youth baseball program

- Founded: 1951; 75 years ago
- Founder: Marius D. Bonacci
- President: Steven M. Tellefsen
- Commissioner: Michael Solanik, and Daniela Bottoni (Softball Commissioner)
- Sports fielded: Baseball and softball
- Countries: United States (all 50 states); 24 other countries
- Headquarters: Hamilton, New Jersey, U.S.
- Website: www.BabeRuthLeague.org

The Babe Ruth League is an international youth baseball and softball league based in Hamilton, New Jersey, United States. It is named after George Herman "Babe" Ruth (1895–1948). The parent program—Babe Ruth League, Incorporated—is a non-profit, tax-exempt charitable organization.

The Babe Ruth League programs of youth baseball sports has increased steadily from its first 10-team league in Hamilton, New Jersey, to its present combined size of well over one million players on some 60,000+ youth teams in more than 11,000 leagues and over 1.9 million additional volunteers.

The Babe Ruth League programs consists of five age divisions: Cal Ripken Baseball (ages 4–12), Babe Ruth Baseball (ages 13–18), Babe Ruth Softball (ages 4–18), Bambino Buddy Ball (ages 5–20), and Xtreme Fastpitch (ages 6–18).

== History ==
=== Founding ===
In 1951, 10 men who believed that the future of their communities depended upon the proper development of young people met at the historic Yardville Hotel in Hamilton, New Jersey, for the purpose of developing a baseball program for young men between 13 and 15 years of age. Babe Ruth League, Inc. recognizes Marius D. Bonacci as the Founding Father of the program, along with the contribution of the following nine men, Samuel M. Welch, Ferdinand J. Wagner, Ed Jones, Ted Jasek, Cliff Fovour, Boots Snyder, William Dombrowski, Maskill Paxson and Willard Carson Jr. Originally organized under the name Little Bigger League, Claire Merritt Ruth, the widow of Babe Ruth, met with the league's organizers six years later in 1954 and authorized them to rename the league in Ruth's memory and honor.

=== Namesake ===
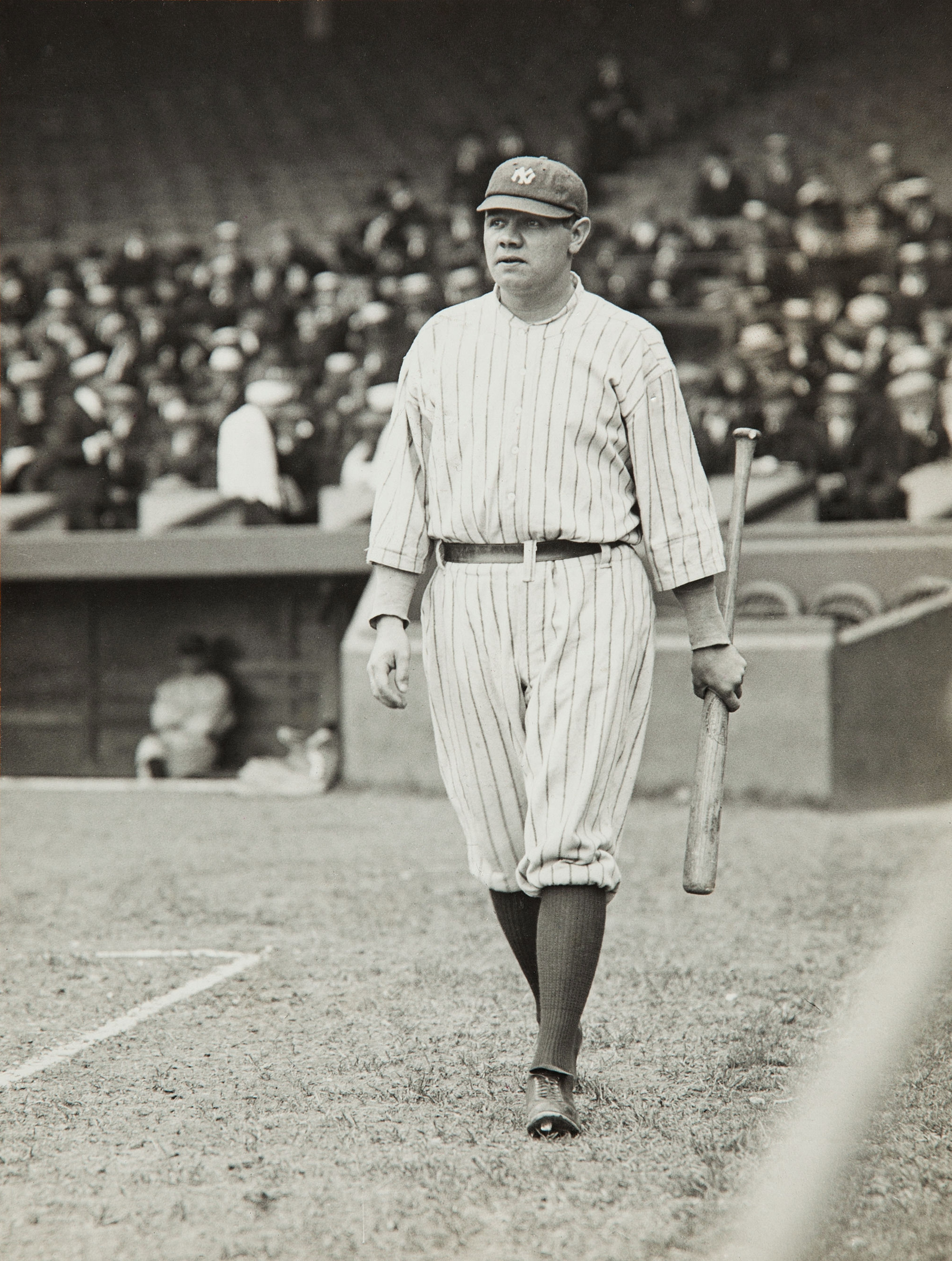
Ruth in 1920

Babe Ruth played baseball beginning at age 19 in his hometown of Baltimore in 1914 at the minor league level of the International League with the Baltimore Orioles, then traded up to the major leagues as first a pitcher to the Boston Red Sox in the American League. Then he went on to his greatest career during the 1920s and 1930s as an outfielder and slugger with the previously lack-luster New York Yankees becoming the nicknamed "Sultan of Swat" and transforming them with additional talented players into the feared "Bronx Bombers" for their first of several decades-long dynasties. In his later declining years, he played one season (1935) with the Boston Braves of the competing National League and served as a coach for the Brooklyn Dodgers in 1938. Ruth was one of five players inducted to the National Baseball Hall of Fame in its inaugural class of 1936.

=== 1970s–1999 ===
In 1974, the 13-Year-Old Prep League level was added. The Prep League allows 13-year-old players to make the transition to the regulation size diamond, while competing with peers their own age.

In 1982, the Babe Ruth League baseball organization added yet another division to its program, the Bambino division for players ages 4–12.

In 1984, Babe Ruth League introduced Babe Ruth Softball to its repertoire. The Softball Division is aimed at girls and young women of 4 to 18 years of age and is designed to give female players of all ability levels a chance to play in the Babe Ruth League.

July 6, 1999, was the beginning of a new era for Babe Ruth League, Inc. The Bambino Division was renamed "Cal Ripken Baseball, a Division of Babe Ruth League, Inc. after the well-known Baltimore Orioles player, Cal Ripken Jr.

=== 2000–present ===
In 2000, the Buddy-Ball Division for players ages 5–20 who are physically and/or mentally challenged was renamed the Bambino BuddyBall Division. A "buddy" helps the player swing a bat, round the bases and catch a ball.

2013 saw the addition of Xtreme Fastpitch to accommodate all softball participants, from those who wish to play on a recreational level to those who seek a higher degree of competition to hone their skills with the goal of continuing play into high school and beyond.

== Divisions ==
=== Cal Ripken Baseball (formerly Bambino Division) ===
Logo for Cal Ripken Baseball - A Division of Babe Ruth League, Inc.

==== Major/70 ====
Featuring a 50' pitching distance and 70' base paths, this division is offered as an option to the major division format, and includes a tournament trail from District competition through the World Series in Branson, Missouri featuring eight International Champions.

==== Major/60 ====
Featuring a 46' pitching distance and 60' base paths and special base running rules, this division is offered as an option to the major division format, and includes a tournament trail from District competition through the World Series.

==== Minors ====
Recommended for ballplayers ages 9–10, this division allows players build and refine their fundamental skills while beginning to understand game strategy and teamwork. In most regions, participants first experience post-season tournament competition in this level, leading to the 10-Year-Old World Series.

==== Rookie ====
Designed primarily for ballplayers ages 7–8, this division makes use of a pitching machine to allow for more hittable balls at the plate and more action in the field. Fear of actually being hit by a pitched ball is diminished. It makes the game safer and improves the playing confidence and ability of all participants.

==== T-Ball ====
Ballplayers ages 4–6 learn hitting and fielding fundamentals in a supportive team environment. Young athletes hit the ball from a batting tee which is height-adjusted for a level swing, batting in order through the line-up for the entire game. The primary goal is to begin to instruct young players in the fundamentals of baseball in a supportive team environment.

=== Babe Ruth Baseball ===
==== 13–15 ====
Also known as Senior Babe Ruth Baseball, Babe Ruth Baseball was created for ballplayers ages 13–15 who wished to continue their baseball playing experience beyond the age of 12. This is the youngest division to use standard 90' diamonds under Official Baseball Rules used by Major League Baseball. In this division, teams are eligible to enter tournament competition and move along the tournament trail, culminating in a World Series. Three World Series are held in this division: one for 13 year-old players, one for 13 and 14 year-old players, and one for 13-15 year-old players. In 2019, the 13–15 World Series was held in Bismarck, ND and was attended by several former participants from the 1969 winning team, including Scott MacGregor.

==== 13-Year-Old Prep ====
Players often express a fear of competing with 14 and 15 year-old players who have already experienced one or two years playing on a standard 90' diamond. Babe Ruth League introduced this prep league, comprising teams with only 13-year-old players, to foster more participation in the game for this age group. This league offers the 13-year-old player the assurance to play without age intimidation and the chance to participate in the 13-Year-Old World Series.

==== 16–18 ====
This is the highest age division in Babe Ruth Baseball. It is open to players aged 16–18 and includes a tournament structure culminating in the 16–18 Year-Old World Series. The division is commonly attended by high school-aged players and provides opportunities for competition prior to collegiate and professional baseball careers.

==== 16 Year-Old Prep ====
The primary objective of the 16-Year-Old Prep program is to provide players the opportunity to stay involved in organized baseball while sharpening their skills against competition in their own age group. Any league franchised in 16–18 Babe Ruth Baseball may also choose to register a 16-Year-Old Prep League.

=== Babe Ruth Softball ===
Logo for Babe Ruth Softball

Designed for girls ages 4–18, age divisions offered include: 6 & Under, 8 & Under, 10 & Under, 12 & Under, 14 & Under, 16 & Under and 18 & Under. The primary emphasis of Babe Ruth Softball is on education, skill development, participation for all levels of ability and recreation.

A special highlight of Babe Ruth Softball is its annual tournament trail. Tournament teams from each local league are eligible to participate in District competition with winners advancing to the State and Regional levels. Entry to the official Babe Ruth Softball tournament trail is free. 12 & Under and 16 & Under Divisions advance to a World Series. Babe Ruth Softball also offers an invitational World Series for the 8 & Under, 10 & Under, and 14 & Under divisions.

=== Bambino Buddy-Ball ===
Logo for Bambino Buddy Ball

The Bambino Buddy-Ball Division was established for organizations who wish to charter a league that encompasses players ages 5–20 who are either physically and/or mentally challenged. This division makes allowance for a “buddy” to help the player swing a bat, round the bases, catch a ball, etc. There are no restrictions to the age of the “buddy”. A Bambino Buddy-Ball team may be composed of players ages 5–20 and sometimes older. The Bambino Buddy-Ball division is designed so that everyone has the opportunity to have fun.

The Bambino Buddy-Ball Division is intended to allow challenged or special needs athletes to develop confidence and positive self-esteem. It allows them to participate in organized sports and supports their physical fitness and social skills.

=== Xtreme Fastpitch ===
Logo for Xtreme Fastpitch

There are no geographical boundaries limiting where the players who sign up for an Xtreme team come from. Participating leagues can sign up a group of players from any geographical make-up and form a team to play other Xtreme teams in special games or tournaments throughout the year.

Xtreme teams are eligible to play at their own facility or in local tournaments. Playing rules match High School and College playing rules to better prepare players for the next level of competition.

== Regions ==
Babe Ruth League consists of 8 Regions.

- Ohio Valley – (Kentucky, Illinois, Indiana, Ohio, Michigan, Wisconsin, and West Virginia)
- Middle Atlantic – (New Jersey, New York, Delaware, Pennsylvania, Maryland, and Ontario)
- Midwest Plains – (Minnesota, Iowa, Missouri, Kansas, Colorado, Nebraska, South Dakota, North Dakota, Saskatchewan, and Manitoba)
- Southeast – (Virginia, Tennessee, North Carolina, South Carolina, Georgia, Florida, Bermuda, and Bahamas)
- Southwest – (Texas, Oklahoma, New Mexico, Arkansas, Louisiana, Mississippi, and Alabama)
- Pacific Northwest – (Washington, Oregon, Idaho, Montana, Wyoming, Alaska, Alberta, and British Columbia)
- Pacific Southwest – (California, Nevada, Utah, Arizona, Hawaii, and Guam)
- New England – (Maine, New Hampshire, Vermont, Massachusetts, Rhode Island, and Connecticut)

== World Series ==
Babe Ruth League offers 12 World Series for its leagues to compete in. The Babe Ruth World Series follows the tournament trail of Districts, States, Regionals, then the World Series. At the World Series, 8 Regional Champions along with the Host League and State Champion compete for the World Series Title. The World Series can be hosted by any chartered league which in turn gets an automatic bid into the World Series.

The Cal Ripken Major/70 World Series is hosted annually at Ballparks of America in Branson, MO. 8 International Teams compete for the International Championship with the winner playing the US Champion for the World Championship.

Other series in the Babe Ruth League include:

- Cal Ripken 10-Year-Old World Series
- Cal Ripken Major/60 baseball World Series (From 2000 to 2006, the U.S. Champion played an International Champion for the World Series title.)
- Cal Ripken Major/70 baseball World Series (The U.S. Champion plays the International Champion for the World Series title.)
- Babe Ruth 13-Year-Old World Series
- Babe Ruth 14-Year-Old World Series
- Babe Ruth 13–15 World Series
- Babe Ruth 16–18 World Series
- Babe Ruth Softball 8U World Series (Invitational)
- Babe Ruth Softball 10U World Series (Invitational)
- Babe Ruth Softball 12U World Series
- Babe Ruth Softball 14U World Series (Invitational)
- Babe Ruth Softball 16U World Series

== Awards ==
- World Series awards
- World Series champions
- Batting champions
- Most Outstanding Players

== Hall of Fame ==
The Babe Ruth League Hall of Fame was established in 1968. Individuals are inducted each year. Organizations are inducted from time to time.

== Notable alumni ==
- Tom Brady – San Mateo, CA
- Chris Drury – Trumbull, CT
- Michael Jordan – Wilmington, NC
- Jimmy Fallon – Saugerties, NY
- Bruce Springsteen – Freehold, NJ
- Jon Stewart – Lawrence, NJ
- Roy Williams (coach) – Wilmington, NC
- John Elway – Pullman, WA
- Scott Boras – Elk Grove, CA
- Jack Del Rio – Hayward, CA
- Mike Trout – Millville, NJ
