= Babe Ruth (film) =

- Genre: Biography; Drama; Sport
- Screenplay by: Michael De Guzman
- Directed by: Mark Tinker
- Starring: Stephen Lang; Brian Doyle-Murray; Donald Moffat; Yvonne Suhor; Bruce Weitz; Lisa Zane
- Composer: Steve Dorff
- Country of origin: United States
- Original language: English

Production
- Executive producer: Lawrence A. Lyttle
- Producer: Frank Pace
- Production locations: Los Angeles; Cleveland
- Cinematography: Donald M. Morgan
- Editor: Stanford C. Allen
- Running time: 99 minutes
- Production companies: Elliot Friedgen & Company; Warner Bros. Television; NBC

Original release
- Network: NBC
- Release: October 6, 1991

Babe Ruth is a 1991 American drama film directed by Mark Tinker and written by Michael De Guzman. The film stars Stephen Lang, Brian Doyle-Murray, Donald Moffat, Yvonne Suhor, Bruce Weitz and Lisa Zane. The film premiered on NBC on October 6, 1991.

== Plot ==
De Guzman's teleplay was adapted from two well-received biographies, Kal Wagenheim's Babe Ruth: His Life and Legend and Robert Creamer's Babe: The Legend Comes to Life, both published in 1974.

== Cast ==
- Stephen Lang as Babe Ruth
- Brian Doyle-Murray as Marshall Hunt
- Donald Moffat as Jacob Ruppert
- Yvonne Suhor as Helen Woodford Ruth
- Bruce Weitz as Miller Huggins
- Lisa Zane as Claire Hodgson Ruth
- William Lucking as Brother Matthias
- Neal McDonough as Lou Gehrig
- John Anderson as Judge Kenesaw Mountain Landis
- Pete Rose as Ty Cobb
- Cy Buynak as Eddie Bennet
- William Flatley as Emil Fuchs
- Stephen Prutting as Jimmy Walker
- Thomas Wagner as Bill Killefer
- Jeffery Blanchard as Jimmy Barton
- Brandi Chrisman as Dorothy
- Charles Fick as Waite Hoyt
- Matthew Glave as Jumpin' Joe Dugan
- Deborah Anne Gorman as Julia
- John Kolibab as Hod Lisenbee
- Andrew May as Wally Pipp
- Clint Nageotte as Young Babe
- Troy Startoni as Charlie Root
- Philip L. Stone as Graham McNamee
- Annabelle Weenick as Mrs. Woodford
- Dale Young as Fred Lieb

== See also ==
- List of baseball films
