= Babe Ruth's called shot =

Home run hit by Babe Ruth in the 1932 World Series that Ruth allegedly forecast

Babe Ruth's called shot was a home run hit by Babe Ruth of the New York Yankees against the Chicago Cubs in the fifth inning of Game 3 of the 1932 World Series, held on October 1, 1932, at Wrigley Field in Chicago. During his at-bat, Ruth made a pointing gesture before hitting the home run to deep center field. One of the reporters at the game wrote that Ruth had "called his shot", using terminology from billiards. The episode added to Ruth's superstardom and became a signature event of baseball's golden age.

Film of the event confirms that Ruth made a pointing gesture, but his intent remains unknown—whether he was promising a home run, or merely gesturing at fans or the Cubs in their dugout.

== Background ==
Before Game 3, the Yankees and the Cubs had shown growing animosity towards one another. Various reasons have been given, with one being Yankee manager Joe McCarthy's grudge against the Cubs who had fired him in 1930, despite winning the National League pennant the previous season. The other concerned Cubs player Mark Koenig, who had been a big part of the Yankees' World Championships in 1927 and 1928 and had been traded to the Cubs mid-season in 1932.

Using his mid-season arrival as the reason, the Cubs players voted that Koenig would only get half of his World Series bonus, which his old Yankee teammates saw as an insult when they heard of it. While warming up before Game 1, Ruth supposedly shouted to Koenig about how his Cub teammates were "cheap bums", which led to the Cubs players shouting back at Ruth, at which point other Yankees players joined in.

The two teams continued to shout insults at one another from their respective dugouts during Games 1 and 2, both won by the Yankees in New York. Before Game 3, Chicago fans had joined in the furore, supposedly cursing and spitting on Ruth and his wife Claire as they arrived at Wrigley Field.

== Event ==
Contemporary reports of the game say that the Cubs' players and fans were mercilessly jeering Ruth throughout. Fans pelted him with lemons as he stood in left field and while at the plate. He responded to the rough treatment verbally and with physical gestures.

Earlier in the game, Ruth had already hit a home run, and also nearly made a shoestring-catch, the miss allowing the Cubs to tie the game; this led to even more heckling from the Cubs players and fans. With the score tied 4–4 in the fifth inning, he took strike one from pitcher Charlie Root. As the Cubs players heckled him and the fans hurled insults, he held up his hand pointing at either Root, the Cubs dugout, or center field. He took strike two, and then repeated this pointing gesture.

It is unclear whether Ruth pointed to center field, to Root, to the Cubs' bench, or was just showing the strike count. In the 1990s, amateur filmmaker Matt Miller Kandle, Sr.'s film of the at-bat was discovered, but the film did not provide anything conclusive. In 2020, an audio clip was discovered from a radio show that originally aired on October 6, 1932, in which Lou Gehrig said that Ruth was indeed pointing toward the flagpole in center field.

Root's next pitch was a curveball, and Ruth hit it to the deepest part of the centerfield near the flagpole. Estimates of the distance vary up to 490 feet. The ground distance to the center-field corner, somewhat right of straightaway center was 440 feet. The ball landed a little bit to the right of the 440 corners and farther back, apparently in the temporary seating in Sheffield Avenue behind the permanent interior bleacher seats. Calling the game over the radio, broadcaster Tom Manning shouted, "The ball is going, going, going, high into the center-field stands ... and it is a home run!". Ruth later described the hit as "past the flagpole" which stood behind the scoreboard and the 440 corners. His powerful hit was aided by a strong carrying wind that day.

Newsreel footage, available in MLB's 100 Years of the World Series, showed that Ruth was crowding the plate and nearly stepped forward out of the batter's box, inches away from the risk of being called out (Rule 6.06a). The film shows that as he rounded first base, he looked toward the Cubs dugout and made a waving-off gesture with his left hand. As he approached third, he made another mocking gesture, a two-armed "push" motion, toward the suddenly quiet Cubs bench. Many reports have claimed that he "thumbed his nose" at the Cubs dugout, but the existing newsreel footage does not show that. The Associated Press game report stated that he raised four fingers, signifying a home run, as he ran the bases.

Attending the game was Franklin D. Roosevelt, then a presidential candidate, as well as a 12-year-old boy named John Paul Stevens, a future associate justice of the United States Supreme Court. Roosevelt reportedly laughed while watching Ruth run the bases.

Root remained in the game but for only one more pitch, which the next batter, Lou Gehrig, hit into the right-field seats for his second home run of the day. The Yankees won the game 7–5. The next day, they defeated the Cubs 13–6, completing a four-game sweep of the World Series.

== Origins of the called-shot story ==
On the day of the game, Joe Williams, a sports editor for the Scripps-Howard newspapers, wrote a headline for a late edition of the New York World-Telegram, evoking billiards terminology: "RUTH CALLS SHOT AS HE PUTS HOME RUN NO. 2 IN SIDE POCKET." Williams' summary of the story read: "In the fifth, with the Cubs riding him unmercifully from the bench, Ruth pointed to center and punched a screaming liner to a spot where no ball had been hit before."

The wide circulation of the Scripps-Howard newspapers most likely gave the story life, as many read Williams' article and assumed that it was accurate. Several days later, other stories appeared stating that Ruth had called his shot, a few written by reporters who were not even at the game. The story was likely to meet with acceptance among the public, who were aware of Ruth's many larger-than-life achievements and his well-publicized fulfilled promise to sick child Johnny Sylvester that he would hit a home run.

Some contemporary newspaper accounts from the day of the game, including that of writer Damon Runyon, mentioned that Ruth simply gestured toward the Cubs' vocal dugout inhabitants after each pitch with the current count: "He engaged in brisk repartee with the Cubs, and the fans. He made gestures with his hands in case his voice was not heard." Others, such as that of William McCullough of the Brooklyn Times-Union, intimated that Ruth may have indeed signaled a home-run gesture: "With the count 2 and 2, Ruth motioned to the Cubs' dugout that he was going to hit one out of the park, and when a low curve came floating down the alley, he swung with all his powerful body."

At the time, Ruth did not clarify the matter, initially stating that he was merely pointing toward the Cubs' dugout to remind them that he still had one more strike. At one point very early on, he said, "It's in the papers, isn't it?". In an interview with Chicago sports reporter John Carmichael, Ruth said that he had not pointed to any particular spot, but that he just wanted to give the ball a good ride. Soon, however, the media-savvy Ruth was going along with the story that he had called his shot, and his subsequent versions over the years became more dramatic. He later stated that he had indeed pointed to where he intended to hit the ball. For one newsreel, he provided a voiceover for the called shot scene with the remarks, "Well, I looked out at center field and I pointed. I said, 'I'm gonna hit the next pitched ball right past the flagpole!' Well, the good Lord must have been with me." In his 1948 autobiography, he provided another enhanced version, by stating that he had told his wife "I'll belt one where it hurts them the most", and that the idea of calling his own shot then came to him. Ruth then recounts the at-bat:

No member of either team was sorer than I was. I had seen nothing my first time at bat that came close to looking good to me, and that only made me more determined to do something about taking the wind out of the sails of the Chicago players and their fans. I mean the fans who had spit on Claire [Ruth's wife].

I came up in the fourth inning with Earle Combs on base ahead of me. My ears had been blistered so much before in my baseball career that I thought they had lost all feeling. But the blast that was turned on me by Cub players and some of the fans penetrated and cut deep. Some of the fans started throwing vegetables and fruit at me.

I stepped back out of the box, then stepped in. And while Root was getting ready to throw his first pitch, I pointed to the bleachers which rise out of deep center field. Root threw one right across the gut of the plate and I let it go. But before the umpire could call it a strike - which it was - I raised my right hand, stuck out one finger and yelled, "Strike one!"

The razzing was stepped up a notch.

Root got set and threw again - another hard one through the middle. And once again I stepped back and held up my right hand and bawled, "Strike two!" It was.

You should have heard those fans then. As for the Cub players they came out on the steps of their dugout and really let me have it.

I guess the smart thing for Charlie to have done on his third pitch would have been to waste one.

But he didn't, and for that I've sometimes thanked God.

While he was making up his mind to pitch to me I stepped back again and pointed my finger at those bleachers, which only caused the mob to howl that much more at me.

Root threw me a fast ball. If I had let it go, it would have been called a strike. But this was it. I swung from the ground with everything I had and as I hit the ball every muscle in my system, every sense I had, told me that I had never hit a better one, that as long as I lived nothing would ever feel as good as this.

I didn't have to look. But I did. That ball just went on and on and on and hit far up in the center-field bleachers in exactly the spot I had pointed to.

To me, it was the funniest, proudest moment I had ever had in baseball. I jogged down toward first base, rounded it, looked back at the Cub bench and suddenly got convulsed with laughter.

You should have seen those Cubs. As Combs said later, "There they were-all out on the top step and yelling their brains out - and then you connected and they watched it and then fell back as if they were being machine-gunned."

That home run - the most famous one I ever hit - did us some good. It was worth two runs, and we won that ball game, 7 to 5.

Ruth said that he was upset about the Cubs' insults during the series, and that he was especially upset that Chicago fans had spat upon his wife Claire. He said that not only had he deliberately pointed to center with two strikes, he had also pointed to center even before Root's first pitch.

Others helped perpetuate the story over the years. Tom Meany, who worked for Joe Williams at the time of the called shot, later wrote a popular but often embellished 1947 biography of Ruth. In the book, Meany wrote, "He pointed to center field. Some say it was merely as a gesture towards Root, others that he was just letting the Cubs bench know that he still had one big one left. Ruth himself has changed his version a couple of times... Whatever the intent of the gesture, the result was, as they say in Hollywood, slightly colossal."

Despite writing the article that may have begun the legend, over the ensuing years, Williams came to doubt the veracity of Ruth's called shot. Similarly, Ruth biographer Robert Creamer believed that, while in a way Ruth had called his shot with his words and gestures to the Cubs, he did not believe that Ruth specifically pointed to center field.

Nonetheless, the called shot further became etched as truth into the minds of thousands of people after the 1948 film The Babe Ruth Story, which starred William Bendix as Ruth. The film took its material from Ruth's autobiography, and presented the called shot as a true event. Two separate biographical films made in the 1990s also repeated this gesture in an unambiguous way, coupled with Ruth hitting the ball over the ivy-covered wall, which did not actually exist at Wrigley Field until five years later.

== Eyewitness accounts ==
The Baby Ruth sign outside Wrigley Field, during the 1935 World Series, three years after the "Called Shot." Note the 440-foot marker in the center field corner. Ruth's hit went to the right of it and farther back.

Eyewitness accounts were equally inconclusive and widely varied, with some of the opinions possibly skewed by partisanship:

- "Don't let anybody tell you differently. Babe definitely pointed." — Cubs public-address announcer Pat Pieper (As public-address announcer Pieper sat next to the wall separating the field from the stands, between home plate and third base. In 1966 he spoke with the Chicago Tribune "In the Wake of the News" sports columnist David Condon: "Pat remembers sitting on the third base side and hearing [Cubs' pitcher] Guy Bush chide Ruth, who had taken two strikes. According to Pat, Ruth told Bush: 'That's strike two, all right. But watch this.' 'Then Ruth pointed to center field, and hit his homer,' Pat continued. 'You bet your life Babe Ruth called it.'")
- "My dad took me to see the World Series, and we were sitting behind third base, not too far back.... Ruth did point to the center-field scoreboard. And he did hit the ball out of the park after he pointed with his bat. So it really happened," stated Associate Justice John Paul Stevens, United States Supreme Court.
- "What do you think of the nerve of that big monkey. Imagine the guy calling his shot and getting away with it." – Lou Gehrig
- The Commissioner of Baseball, Kenesaw Mountain Landis, attended the game with his young nephew, and both had a clear view of the action at home plate. Landis himself never commented on whether he believed Ruth called the shot, but his nephew believes that Ruth did not call it.
- Shirley Povich, a columnist for The Washington Post, interviewed Hall-of-Fame catcher Bill Dickey. "Ruth was just mad about that quick pitch, Dickey explained. He was pointing at Root, not at the centerfield stands. He called him a couple of names and said, "Don't do that to me anymore, you blankety-blank."
- Ray Kelly, Ruth's guest for the game, said, "He absolutely did it ... I was right there. Never in doubt."
- Erle V. Painter, the Yankees athletic trainer at the time, shared his recollection of the shot with the Baseball Hall of Fame. He stated, "Ruth made a three-quarter turn to the stands and held up one finger. It was plain he was signifying one strike didn't mean he was out. Root put over another strike and the Babe repeated the pantomime, holding up two fingers this time. Then, before taking his stance, he swept his left arm full length and pointed to the centerfield fence."

The called shot particularly irked Root. He won over 200 games during his career, but was often described as the pitcher who gave up the "called shot", much to his annoyance. When he was asked to play himself in the 1948 film The Babe Ruth Story, Root turned it down when he learned that Ruth's pointing to center field would be in the film. He said "Ruth did not point at the fence before he swung. If he had made a gesture like that, well, anybody who knows me knows that Ruth would have ended up on his ass [via a brushback pitch]. The legend didn't get started until later."

Root's teammate, catcher Gabby Hartnett, also denied that Ruth called the shot. According to baseball historian and author Michael Bryson, Ruth pointed toward the outfield to draw attention to a loose board that was swinging free. Some people may have misinterpreted this as a "called shot", but Cubs personnel knew exactly what he was pointing to, and hammered the board back into place.

In 1942, during the making of The Pride of the Yankees, Babe Herman, who was at that time a teammate of Ruth with the minor league Hollywood Stars, was on the movie set as a double for both Ruth, who played himself in most scenes, and Gary Cooper, who played Lou Gehrig. Herman re-introduced Root and Ruth on set and the following exchange, later recounted by Herman to baseball historian Donald Honig, took place:

- Root: "You never pointed out to center field before you hit that ball off me, did you?"
- Ruth: "I know I didn't, but it made a hell of a story, didn't it?"

Root went to his grave vehemently denying that Ruth ever pointed to center field.

== Rediscovered 16-mm films ==
A still of Ruth pointing during the at-bat. Root's back is turned to Ruth at that moment.

In the 1970s, a 16-mm home movie of the called shot surfaced, and some believed that it might put an end to the decades-old controversy. The film was shot by an amateur filmmaker named Matt Miller Kandle, Sr. Only family and friends had seen the film until the late 1980s. Two frames from the film were published in the 1988 book Babe Ruth: A Life in Pictures by Lawrence S. Ritter and Mark Rucker, on p. 206. The film was broadcast on a February 1994 Fox television program called Front Page. Later in 1994, still images from the film appeared in filmmaker Ken Burns' documentary Baseball.

The film was shot from the grandstands behind home plate, off to the third base side. While Ruth's gesture is clearly visible, the direction in which he is pointing is uncertain. Some contend that Ruth's extended arm is pointing more to the left-field direction, toward the Cubs bench, which would be consistent with his continued gesturing toward the bench while rounding the bases after the home run.

On the episode of Front Page, the film was shown to Yankee legends Mickey Mantle, Moose Skowron, Catfish Hunter, Enos Slaughter, and Ron Guidry. In his observation of the film, Mantle believed that the most visible points from Ruth were in the direction of the Cubs dugout, but then noticed that Ruth did briefly point in the direction of Cubs pitcher Charlie Root or toward center field just prior to the pitch from Root, partially obscured by Hartnett as he was throwing the ball back to Root.

In 1999, another 16-mm film of the called shot was made public. This film was shot by inventor Harold Warp during the only Major League Baseball game that he ever attended. The rights to his footage were sold to ESPN, which aired it as part of the network's SportsCentury program in 2000. Warp's film has not been as widely seen by the public as Kandle's film, but many of those who have seen it think that it shows that Ruth did not call his shot. The film shows the action much more clearly than does the Kandle film, showing Ruth shouting something either at Root or at the Cubs dugout while pointing.

The authors of the book Yankees Century believe that the Warp film proves conclusively that the home run was not a "called shot." However, Leigh Montville's 2006 book The Big Bam asserts that neither film answers the question definitively.

== Legacy and cultural references ==
In the 1984 film The Natural, The Whammer, played by Joe Don Baker and modeled after Babe Ruth, makes a gesture with his bat that closely mimics the Ruth gesture. He then swings and strikes out. Major league slugger Jim Thome used a similar bat-pointing gesture as part of his normal preparation for an at-bat.

The climax of the 1989 film Major League depicts Cleveland Indians catcher Jake Taylor pointing toward the outfield, making a reference to Ruth's called shot. Taylor bunts the next pitch in a squeeze play that scores the winning run from second base.

In the 1993 film The Sandlot, the older version of the lead character Scotty Smalls, who went on to become a color announcer for the Los Angeles Dodgers, makes a reference to the shot at the beginning of the film.

In 2005, the jersey that Ruth was wearing during the game was sold for US$1,056,630 at auction, and was placed on loan to the New York Yankees Museum. On August 25, 2024, the jersey was sold via Heritage Auctions for a record $24.12 million, making it the most expensive sports collectible in history, eclipsing the $12.6 million paid for a 1952 Topps baseball card featuring Mickey Mantle in 2022.

== Bibliography ==
- Creamer, Robert W. (1974). Babe: The Legend Comes to Life. New York: Simon & Schuster. ISBN 0-671-21770-4.
- Honig, Donald (1985). Baseball America: The Heroes of the Game and the Times of Their Glory. New York: Scribner. ISBN 0-025-53580-3.
- Sherman, Ed (2014). Babe Ruth's Called Shot: The Myth and Mystery of Baseball's Greatest Home Run. Guilford, CT: Lyons Press. ISBN 978-0-762-78539-1.
- Snell, Roger (2009). Root for the Cubs: Charlie Root & the 1929 Chicago Cubs. Nicholasville, KY: Wind Publications. ISBN 978-1-893-23995-1.
- Stout, Glenn (2002). Yankees Century: 100 Years of New York Yankees Baseball. New York: Houghton Mifflin. ISBN 0-618-08527-0.
