= Claire Merritt Ruth =

Second wife of Babe Ruth (1900–1976)

- Claire Ruth at the unveiling of a memorial plaque in honor of her husband, Babe Ruth, at Baltimore's old Memorial Stadium (1955)
- Born: September 11, 1900; Athens, Georgia, U.S.
- Died: October 25, 1976 (aged 76); New York City, US
- Spouses: Frank Hodgson (death 1921); Babe Ruth (m. 1929; death 1948)

Claire Merritt Hodgson Ruth (born Clara Mae Merritt; September 11, 1900 – October 25, 1976) was the second wife of Babe Ruth.

== Biography ==
Hodgson's first husband, Frank Hodgson, died on February 16, 1921, leaving her with a daughter, Julia. She met Ruth in 1923. Ruth was still married to Helen Woodford, his first wife, at this time. Woodford died in a house fire in January 1929, and Ruth and Hodgson married that April 17, staying together until Ruth's death in 1948.

In later years, she indicated her responsibility, in part, for the poor relationship between her husband and teammate Lou Gehrig. According to her, Gehrig's mother indicated that the Ruth's' adopted daughter, Dorothy, was not as well dressed as Claire's biological daughter, Julia. When Claire Ruth was informed of this, she angrily demanded that Gehrig never speak to him off the ball field again. Ruth and Gehrig did not make up until the day of Gehrig's famous "I'm the luckiest man on the face of this earth" speech in 1939. Later, Ruth admitted that she had overreacted, apologetically accepting full responsibility for the rift between the two players which, however, had numerous other causes besides the one indicated by Hodgson.

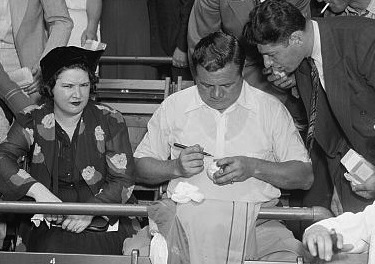
Claire and Babe Ruth in 1937, two years after his retirement from baseball.

Claire Ruth lived to see two of "The Babe's" most famous records broken: his single season record of 60 home runs, superseded by Roger Maris in 1961; and his career record of 714 home runs, which was broken by Hank Aaron in 1974. In her later years, she sometimes attended games in which Aaron was playing, and was supportive of Aaron's efforts. Ruth was quoted as saying: "The Babe loved baseball so very much; I know he was pulling for Hank Aaron to break his record."

Ruth is buried next to her husband at Gate of Heaven Cemetery in Hawthorne, New York.

== Media portrayal ==
Ruth was portrayed by Claire Trevor in the 1948 film The Babe Ruth Story, by Lisa Zane in the 1991 TV movie Babe Ruth, by Kelly McGillis in the 1992 film The Babe, and by Renée Taylor in 61*.
