= Thomas Lennon (screenwriter, born 1896) =

American screenwriter and dramatist

- Born: Thomas Lloyd Lennon; May 10, 1896; San Francisco, California
- Died: March 17, 1963 (aged 66); Los Angeles, California
- Occupation: Screenwriter
- Known for: work with Frank Buck
- Spouse: Margaret Lennon
- Children: 1

Thomas Lloyd Lennon (May 10, 1896 – March 17, 1963) was an American screenwriter who wrote Frank Buck’s film, Jacaré, and a screen adaptation of the Maxwell Anderson play Knickerbocker Holiday.

== Early years ==
Thomas Lennon was the son of John Lennon, a wholesale grocer, born in Ireland in 1847, and Mary Lennon. Thomas was a World War I veteran, according to the 1930 US Census.

== Motion pictures ==
In 1934 Lennon won recognition as author of The Laughing Journey, a bitter and brilliant Irish novel. It was too artistic for Hollywood to regard seriously, so he continued in his job as copy editor in the RKO press office. Lennon was assigned to prepare a Wheeler & Woolsey comedy but just as he was about to begin, was offered a part in Katharine Hepburn's Sylvia Scarlett. Lennon promptly accepted because, as he said, "actors make indecent wages." In 1937, Lennon was a writer of The Man Who Found Himself. After a few more assignments Lennon moved to MGM in 1938.

== Hollywood Ten ==
Lennon wrote two screenplays with men later part of the Hollywood Ten:

- Secrets of a Nurse (1938) with Lester Cole, about a nurse whose duties lead her to evidence of corruption in professional prize-fighting
- We Go Fast (1941) with Adrian Scott, a B-movie comedy

== Work on Jacaré ==
Lennon was the writer of Jacaré, for which Clyde E. Elliott, Charles E. Ford and James Dannaldson shot some 260,000 feet of film on the lower reaches of the Amazon River in Spring 1942. The group spent three and a half months at Para, at the mouth of the Amazon, usually within a day's journey of the city, so that they could return to civilization for the night. The company's most primitive adventure occurred on Marajó Island, at the mouth of the Amazon, where they spent four weeks. They ran out of imported food and had to subsist for five days on moldy doughnuts filled with small worms and on chickens which seemed to be 90 per cent vulture.

== Later career ==
In 1942 Lennon wrote a play about William Shakespeare and Anne Hathaway, The Truth About Ann. In 1944 Lennon wrote a screen adaptation of the Maxwell Anderson play, Knickerbocker Holiday.

== Family and final years ==
Thomas and Margaret Lennon had one daughter. Thomas Lennon died in Los Angeles.
