= James B. Shackelford =

American cinematographer

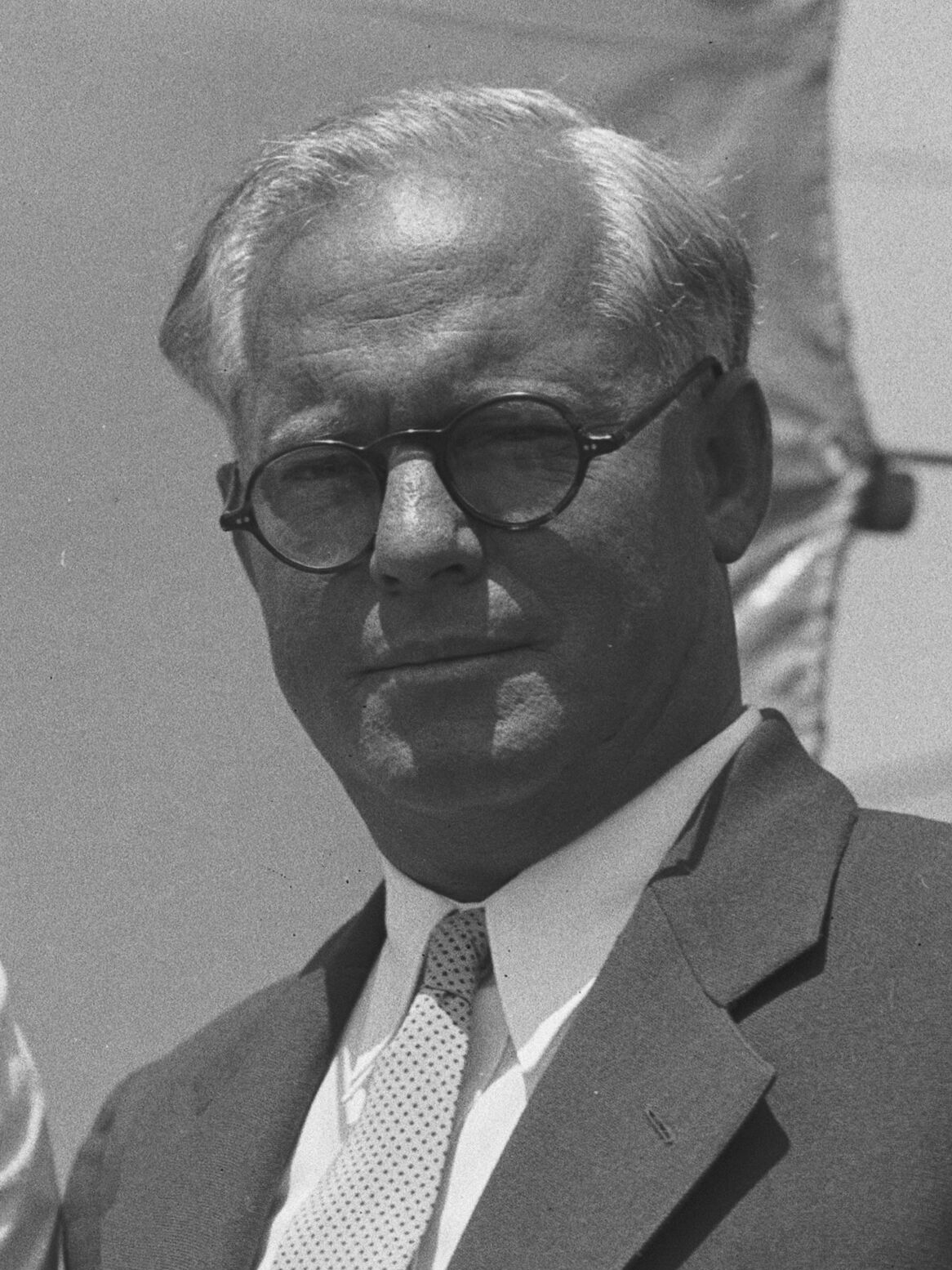
- Shackelford in 1933
- Born: 20 September 1886; Wichita, Kansas
- Died: 5 August 1969 (aged 82); Los Angeles, California
- Occupation: cinematographer
- Known for: work with Frank Buck and paleontologist Roy Chapman Andrews
- Spouse: Jean E. Shackelford

James Blaine Shackelford (20 September 1886 – 5 August 1969) was a cinematographer. Born Wichita, Kansas, he was the son of Joel M. Shackelford. Young James grew up in the home of a guardian, Jerome Brooks, a farmer, in Enid, Oklahoma. James Shackelford died in Los Angeles, California.

== Career ==
Shackelford was a cinematographer for Roy Chapman Andrews, an American explorer, adventurer, naturalist and director of the American Museum of Natural History. He accompanied Andrews on a series of expeditions through the fragmented China of the early 20th century into the Gobi Desert and Mongolia. The expeditions made important discoveries and brought the first-known fossil dinosaur eggs to the museum.

In 1933, Shackelford and George Dromgold traveled to the Great Barrier Reef and Papua, spending three months at Fiji. At Suva, they observed and analyzed fire-walking. Dromgold wrote a book, Two Lugs on a Lugger, with photographs by Shackelford, describing their adventures.

Shackelford was cinematographer for the film crew of Clyde E. Elliott, Charles E. Ford and James Dannaldson, which shot some 260,000 feet of film on the lower reaches of the Amazon River in Spring 1942. The film became Frank Buck's popular movie Jacaré. The group spent three and a half months at Para, at the mouth of the Amazon, usually within a day's journey of the city, so that they could return to civilization for the night. The company's most primitive adventure occurred on Marajó Island, at the mouth of the Amazon, where they spent four weeks. They ran out of imported food and had to subsist for five days on moldy doughnuts filled with small worms and on chickens which seemed to be 90 percent vulture.

Shackelford's later career included work in The Bells in Old Town (1946, Klockorna i Gamla sta'n was the original Swedish title).
