= Jules Levy =

Jules Levy may refer to:

- Jules Levy (musician) (1838–1903), British cornetist, teacher, and composer
- Jules Levy (producer) (1923–2003), American television and film producer
- Jules Lévy (writer), French writer and publisher who founded the Incoherents art movement in 1882.

== See also ==
- Jules Levey (1896–1975), American film producer
