= Jacaré (film) =

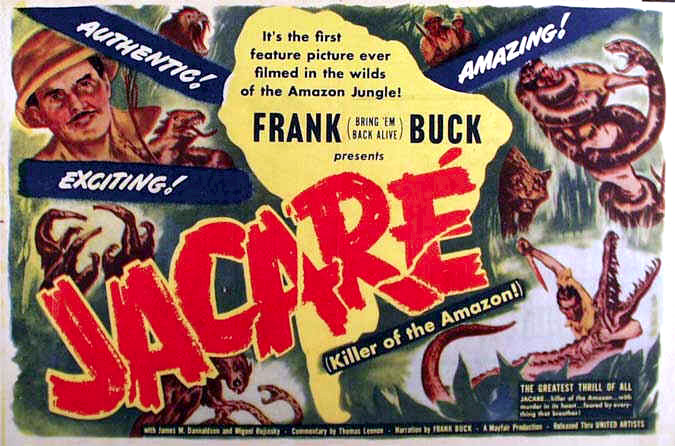
- Theatrical poster
- Directed by: Charles E. Ford; Clyde E. Elliott (uncredited)
- Written by: Thomas L. Lennon
- Produced by: Jules Levey
- Starring: James Dannaldson; Frank Buck; Miguel Rojinsky
- Cinematography: James B. Shackelford
- Edited by: Otho Lovering
- Music by: Miklós Rózsa
- Distributed by: United Artists
- Release date: 1942
- Running time: 65 minutes
- Country: United States
- Language: English
- Budget: $100,000

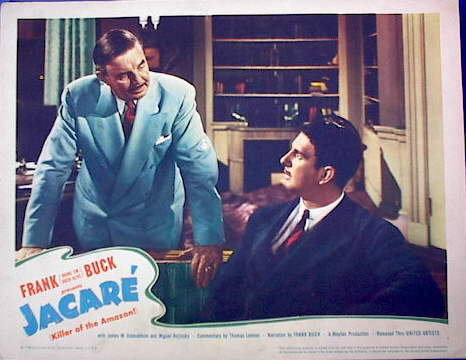
Promotional photo for the film, showing Frank Buck (left) and James Dannaldson (right)

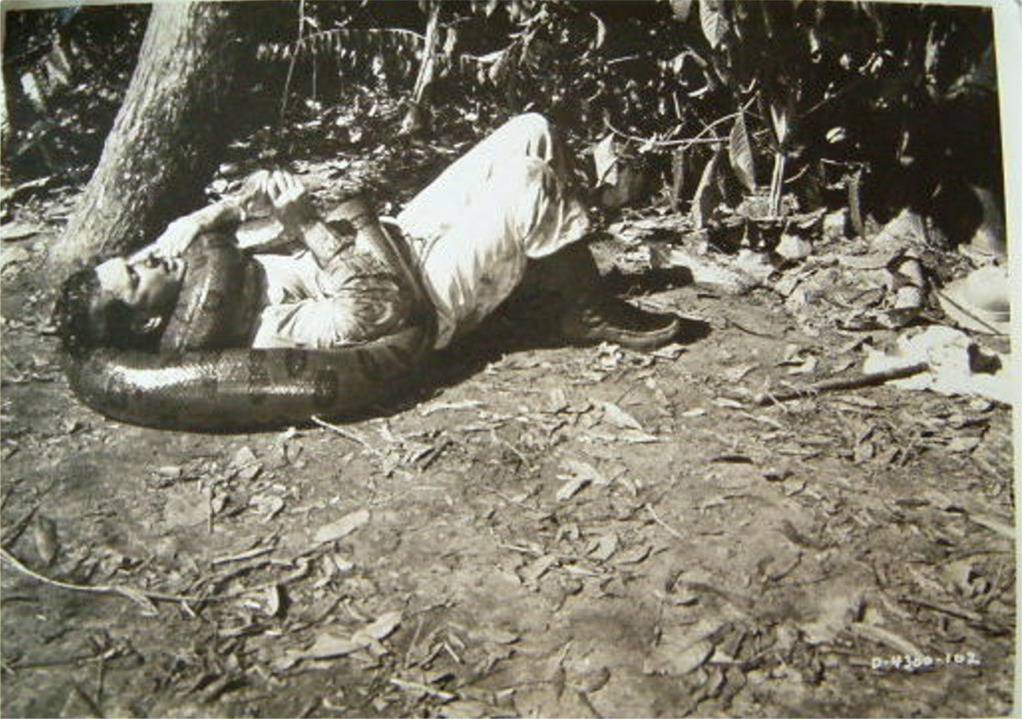
Dannaldson wrestling with an anaconda in Jacaré

Jacaré (also called Jacaré, Killer of the Amazon) was a film made in 1942 of James Dannaldson’s expedition to the Amazon.

Clyde E. Elliott, Charles E. Ford and James Dannaldson led the film crew, which shot some 260,000 feet of film on the lower reaches of the Amazon River in Spring 1942. To Elliott's great relief, the film was not "doctored" with scenes made at the studio of white girls lost in the jungle, a process, he claimed, by which Paramount ruined his previous film, Booloo, made in 1938.

Dannaldson, a biologist formerly associated with the University of Southern California, became an actor for Jacaré, who goes up the Amazon to catch specimens. The other leading members of the cast were a 22-foot anaconda, many caymans (Amazonian alligators), jaguars, water buffalo, anteaters, tapirs and capybaras.

Elliott and his colleagues, with two American cameramen, spent three and a half months at Para, at the mouth of the Amazon, usually within a day's journey of the city, so that they could return to civilization for the night. Their chief expense, aside from film and equipment, was insurance, the premiums protecting negative, cameras and personnel. A crew of thirty-five natives, who acted as bearers and animal catchers, cost 50 cents a day apiece. When the filmmakers needed a gaggle of caymans, Ford offered a prize of 60 Milréis to the native who captured the largest alligator. Ford got about seventy-five of the reptiles at a cost of approximately $3.

Dannaldson worked with jaguars and caymans, whose jaws had been wired shut. He said his only close call came when an anaconda he wrestled got a loop around his neck and almost strangled him before the natives could unwrap it.

The company's most primitive adventure occurred on Marajó Island, at the mouth of the Amazon, where they spent four weeks. They ran out of imported food and had to subsist for five days on moldy doughnuts filled with small worms and on chickens which, Dannaldson said, seemed to be 90 per cent vulture.

Jacaré’s wild-animal footage thrilled audiences, especially the terrifying attack of the anaconda. Producer Jules Levey incorporated a narration by Frank Buck and music by Miklos Rozsa. Director Charles E. Ford died of peritonitis after surgery in Cedars of Lebanon Hospital shortly after returning from the Amazon.
