= Dutch Ruether =

American baseball player (1893–1970)

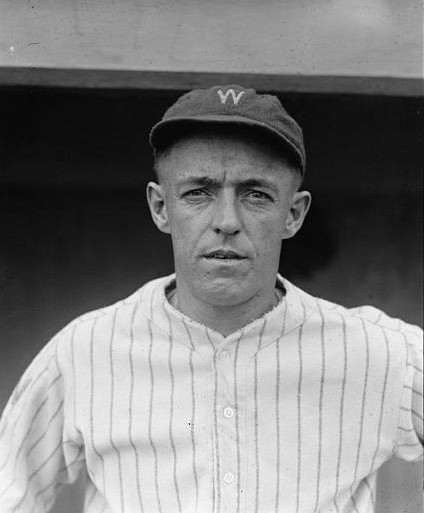
- Pitcher
- Born: September 13, 1893; Alameda, California, U.S.
- Died: May 16, 1970 (aged 76); Phoenix, Arizona, U.S.
- Batted: Left Threw: Left

MLB debut
- April 13, 1917, for the Chicago Cubs

Last MLB appearance
- September 29, 1927, for the New York Yankees

MLB statistics
- Win–loss record: 137–95
- Earned run average: 3.50
- Strikeouts: 708
- Stats at Baseball Reference

Teams
- Chicago Cubs (1917); Cincinnati Reds (1917–1920); Brooklyn Robins (1921–1924); Washington Senators (1925–1926); New York Yankees (1926–1927)

Career highlights and awards
- 2× World Series champion (1919, 1927)

Walter Henry Ruether (September 13, 1893 – May 16, 1970) was an American baseball player who pitched for five different major league teams. In his 11-year career, Ruether played for the Chicago Cubs, the Cincinnati Reds, the Brooklyn Robins, the Washington Senators, and the New York Yankees.

He appeared in the 1919 World Series with the Reds, in the 1925 World Series with the Senators, and in the 1926 World Series with the Yankees. Ruether was also a member of the 1927 Yankees. Though that team played in the 1927 World Series, Ruether did not participate in any of the games.

== Early life ==
Ruether was born in Alameda, California to his mother Augusta and his father Frederick Ruether who were German immigrants. He was youngest of his family, having two older siblings. During his childhood, his father Frederick was a partner in a cigar manufacturing business in San Francisco.

When he became an adult, Ruether attended St. Ignatius College. On March 10, 1913, St. Ignatius participated in an exhibition game against the Chicago White Sox. Ruether, a left-hander, pitched in the game for St. Ignatius. In the ninth-inning, White Sox shortstop Buck Weaver hit a 3-run home run off Ruether. This secured the victory for the White Sox, and Ruether lost the contest 4–2.

Ruether parlayed his strong outing into a try-out with the Pittsburgh Pirates of the National League. After reporting to Hot Springs, Arkansas for the Pirates' training camp, he signed a contract. The contract stated that Ruether could opt out if the Pirates attempted to assign him to a Minor league farm team. The Pirates did just that, and consequently, Ruether left the organization.

After he left the Pirates, Ruether went to play in the Northwest League. He spent the 1914 season and the 1915 season with the Vancouver Beavers. In 1916, Ruether moved to the Spokane Indians. That team went on to win the pennant.

== Major League career ==
In 1917, Ruether signed with the Chicago Cubs. He made his Major League debut in April of that year. After he had appeared in 10 games for the Cubs, the Cincinnati Reds selected Ruether off waivers on July 17, 1917.

After finishing the 1917 season, Ruether enlisted in the United States Army due to the break out of World War I. He reported to Camp Lewis.

In 1919, Ruether rejoined the Reds. He won nineteen games that season and the Reds made the 1919 World Series. Though Cincinnati won the series, it has become infamous for the Black Sox Scandal.

Ruether spent the 1920 season with the Reds. On December 15 of that year, the Reds traded Ruether to the Brooklyn Robins in exchange for Rube Marquard.

He spent the next four seasons as a pitcher for the Robins. During the 1924 season, Ruether suffered from arm problems. After an apparent dispute with Charles Ebbets, the Robins owner, the Washington Senators purchased Ruether from the Robins.

Ruether spent the next year and a half with the Senators before the team traded him to the New York Yankees on August 27, 1926 While with the Senators, Ruether appeared in the 1925 World Series. Although he was a pitcher, Ruether did not pitch in the series. Instead, he was used as a pinch hitter and recorded one at-bat. For his career, Ruether was a good hitting pitcher with a .258 batting average and 250 career hits.

The Yankees earned a spot in the 1926 World Series against the St. Louis Cardinals, and Ruether pitched in game three. The game did not go well for Ruether. The Cardinals won 4–0.

In 1927, Ruether played for his third consecutive pennant winning team. However, Ruether did not appear in the 1927 World Series. The 1927 season was his last in the Major Leagues.

Ruether recorded 137 wins and 95 losses, for a .591 winning percentage. Ruether holds the National League record for most innings pitched in a season opening game. On opening day 1923, he pitched 14-innings for the Robins.

== Post major league career ==
Ruether left the Yankees after the 1927 championship and then pitched in the Pacific Coast League until 1933. In 1934, Ruether retired from active play and joined the Seattle Indians as the team manager. The league voted Ruether the All-star team manager in his first year. Ruether left the league in 1936.

Later in his life, Ruether served as a scout for the Chicago Cubs and San Francisco Giants. He helped discover players such as Joey Amalfitano, Eddie Bressoud, Peanuts Lowrey and Mike McCormick.

Ruether died in Phoenix, Arizona at age 76.

== References & Footnotes ==
| Preceded by Leon Cadore | Brooklyn Robins Opening Day; Starting pitcher 1922–1924 | Succeeded by Dazzy Vance |
