= Jules Levey =

American film producer

- Levey and wife Mae Ann, 1933
- Born: May 2, 1896; Rochester, New York
- Died: January 2, 1975 (aged 78); New York City
- Occupation: film producer
- Spouse: Mae Ann Wolf (23 aug 1922–12 jul 1959, her death)

Jules Levey (May 2, 1896 – January 2, 1975) was an American film producer.

== Early career ==
Born in Rochester, New York, Levey joined Universal Pictures as Eastern sales manager in 1919 and worked for several major producers. He was in charge of sales for RKO Pictures and also headed RKO Theaters, the distributing organization.

== Independent Producer ==
In 1939, Levey became an independent producer. His Mayfair Productions (at 1250 6th Avenue, New York) turned out films including The Boys From Syracuse, Pardon My Sarong, The Hairy Ape, New Orleans and Hellzapoppin'. Most of his films were made and distributed by Universal. He also imported several foreign films, among them the Italian movie Fabiola.

In 1942, Levey produced Jacaré, Killer of the Amazon. Former Universal newsreel editor Charles E. Ford directed this filmed record of James Dannaldson's hunting expedition into the Amazon jungles. The film is filled with wild-animal footage, including a terrifying attack by a 28-foot anaconda. Levey incorporated a narration by Frank Buck and music by Miklos Rozsa.

Levey produced The Hairy Ape in 1944. Afterward, he became curious as to how familiar the general public was with the author, Eugene O'Neill. "Have you ever heard of Eugene O'Neill? Have you ever heard of The Hairy Ape?" were the questions posed in eight cities east of the Mississippi to 1,008 individuals. 61 per cent had heard of O'Neill and 52.1 per cent had heard of The Hairy Ape. But a breakdown showed that though the majority had heard of the names of both the author and his work, they didn't all know that O'Neill was a playwright and that "The Hairy Ape" was the title of a play. There was, for instance, the group (0.8 per cent) which believed O'Neill was a baseball player, while a smaller group (0.3 per cent) identified O'Neill as the name of a Liberty ship. Although 17.1 per cent recognized the title as a play, 10.7 per cent thought it was the name of a comic strip character, while 8 per cent were sure "The Hairy Ape" was a wrestler.

In 1955, after a period of inactivity, Levey announced plans to film Thomas Costain's novel The Tontine, starring Spencer Tracy, but the film was never made.

== Later life ==
Levey lived in New York at 970 Park Avenue, then at 24 West 55th Street (the Rockefeller Apartments). He died, apparently of a heart attack, on a Manhattan street.

== Filmography ==
- The Boys from Syracuse (1940) (producer)
- Tight Shoes (1941) (producer)
- Hellzapoppin' (1941) (producer) (uncredited)
- Jacaré (1942) (producer)
- Pardon My Sarong (1942) (producer)
- Butch Minds the Baby (1942) (producer)
- The Hairy Ape (1944) (producer)
- Abilene Town (1946) (producer)
- New Orleans (1947) (producer)
