= 1926 World Series =

1926 Major League Baseball championship series

- Rogers Hornsby tags out Babe Ruth who is caught attempting to steal second base, ending the 1926 World Series.
Team (Wins)	Managers	Season
St. Louis Cardinals (4)	Rogers Hornsby (player/manager)	89–65, .578, GA: 2
New York Yankees (3)	Miller Huggins	91–63, .591, GA: 3
- Dates: October 2–10
- Venue(s): Yankee Stadium (New York); Sportsman's Park (St. Louis)
- Umpires: Bill Dinneen (AL), Hank O'Day (NL); Bill Klem (NL), George Hildebrand (AL)
- Hall of Famers: Umpires: Bill Klem; Hank O'Day; Cardinals: Rogers Hornsby (player-manager); Grover Cleveland Alexander; Jim Bottomley; Chick Hafey; Jesse Haines; Billy Southworth‡ Yankees: Miller Huggins (manager)‡ Earle Combs; Lou Gehrig; Waite Hoyt; Tony Lazzeri; Herb Pennock; Babe Ruth ‡ Elected as a manager

Broadcast
- Radio: Westinghouse
- Radio announcers: Graham McNamee and Phillips Carlin

The 1926 World Series was the championship series of the 1926 Major League Baseball season. The 23rd edition of the World Series, it was a best-of-seven playoff pitting the National League (NL) champion St. Louis Cardinals against the American League champion (AL) New York Yankees. The Cardinals defeated the Yankees four games to three in the series, which took place from October 2 to 10, 1926, at Yankee Stadium and Sportsman's Park. This was the first professional sports championship ever won by a St. Louis-based team.

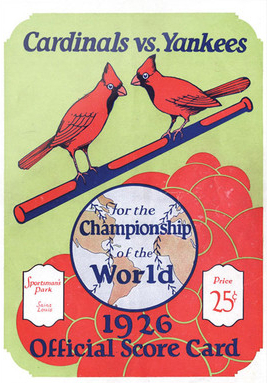
Scorecard for the series.

This was the first World Series appearance (and first National League pennant win) for the Cardinals, and would be the first of 11 World Series championships in Cardinals history. The Yankees were playing in their fourth World Series in six years after winning their first American League pennant in 1921 and their first world championship in 1923. They would play in another 37 World Series (and win 26 of those), as of the end of the 2025 season.

Cardinals' player-manager Rogers Hornsby's mother died on September 29 in Texas and doubt arose whether Hornsby would play in the Series. Hornsby was conflicted, but received a telegram from his uncle that his mother wished him to play in the Series, and the burial was delayed until after its conclusion.

In Game 1, Herb Pennock pitched the Yankees to a 2–1 win over the Cards. In Game 2, pitcher Grover Cleveland Alexander evened the Series for St. Louis with a 6–2 victory. Knuckleballer Jesse Haines' shutout in Game 3 gave St. Louis a 2–1 Series lead. In the Yankees' 10–5 Game 4 win, Babe Ruth hit three home runs, a World Series record equaled only four times since. According to newspaper reports, Ruth had promised a sickly boy named Johnny Sylvester to hit a home run for him in Game 4. After Ruth's three-homer game, the boy's condition miraculously improved. The newspapers' account of the story is disputed by contemporary baseball historians, but it remains one of the most famous anecdotes in baseball history. Pennock again won for the Yankees in Game 5, 3–2.

The Cards Hornsby chose Alexander to start Game 6, and used him in relief to close out Game 7. Behind Alexander, the Cardinals won the final two games of the series, and thus the world championship. In Game 7, the Yankees, trailing 3–2 in the bottom of the ninth inning and down to their last out, Ruth walked, bringing up Bob Meusel. Ruth, successful in half of his stolen base attempts in his career, took off for second base on the first pitch. Meusel swung and missed, and catcher Bob O'Farrell threw to second baseman Hornsby who tagged Ruth out, ending Game 7 and thereby crowning his Cardinals World Series champions for the first time. The 1926 World Series is the only Series to date which ended with a baserunner being caught stealing.

This World Series also started the Cardinals run of dominance in the National League. Between the years 1926 and 1934, St. Louis captured five National League pennants and won three World Series titles.

In 2020, ESPN ranked the 1926 World Series as the 10th best ever played.

== Season summary ==
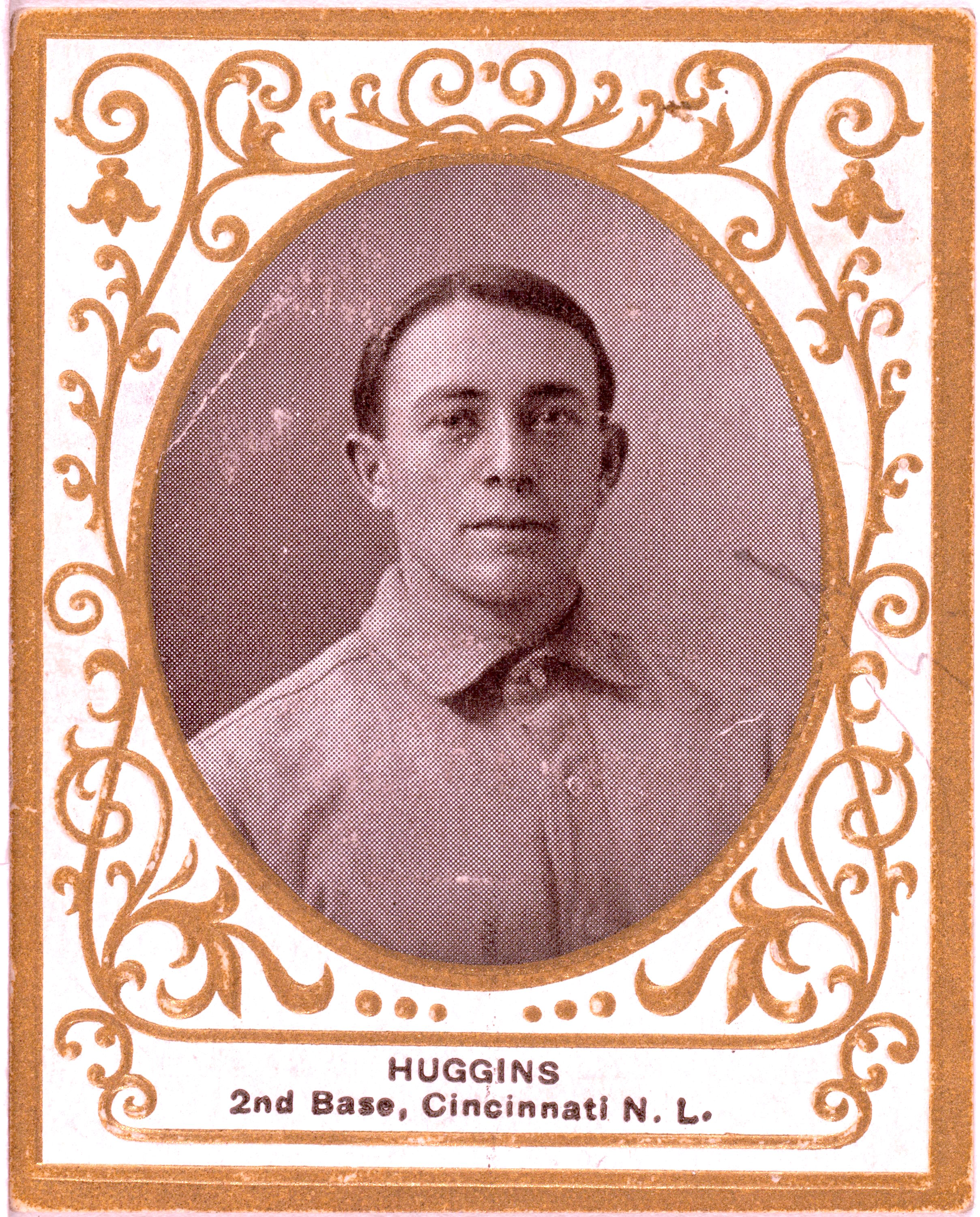
Yankees manager Miller Huggins on a 1909 baseball card

The Cardinals won the 1926 National League pennant with 89 wins and 65 losses, two games ahead of the runner-up Cincinnati Reds, after finishing only fourth in 1925 at 77–76. Before 1926 was half over, they traded outfielder Heinie Mueller to the New York Giants for outfielder Billy Southworth. They also claimed future Hall of Fame pitcher Grover Cleveland Alexander on waivers from the Chicago Cubs. Their starting rotation was led by Flint Rhem with 20 wins and a 3.21 earned run average (ERA), far surpassing his eight wins and 4.92 ERA of 1925. Offensively, the Cardinals were led by Jim Bottomley, Rogers Hornsby (who had batted over .400 in 1925) and catcher Bob O'Farrell, 1926 National League MVP-to-be.

The 1926 NL pennant race was heated. During the second and third weeks of September, both the Cardinals and the Reds had multi-game winning streaks and traded first and second place almost every day. On September 17, the Cards took a one-game lead over the Reds and extended their lead when the Reds lost several games in a row. They lost the last game of the season to the Reds on September 26, but still finished two games ahead of them in first place in the final standings.

The Yankees had the best record in the AL at 91–63, finishing three games ahead of the Cleveland Indians and greatly improving on their 69-win, seventh-place 1925 season. Lou Gehrig played his first full season as the Yankees' starting first baseman, and the team traded for rookie shortstop Tony Lazzeri in the offseason, eventually playing him at second base. Gehrig, Lazzeri and Ruth led the offense, while Pennock and Urban Shocker led the starting rotation with 42 wins between them.

In early September 1926, thousands of Cleveland fans, confident that their Indians would win the pennant even when they trailed the Yankees by six games, made World Series ticket reservations. By September 23, the Indians were only two games behind New York, but then lost three of their final four games to finish the season three games behind.

On September 11, Baseball Commissioner Kenesaw Mountain Landis met with representatives from four of the top teams in each of the two major leagues. The group gave home field to the AL for World Series Games 1–2 (scheduled for October 2 and 3) and 6–7, while the NL would host Games 3–5. Each game was to start at 1:30 p.m. local time.

Some bookmakers made the Yankees a 15-to-1 Series favorite, while others, like New York's top betting commissioners, thought the teams were evenly matched. One New York Times writer found "little justification for installing either team as the favorite". Regardless of the odds, players from both teams were confident of victory. Hornsby said, "We're going to come through winners. We have the better pitching staff, the better hitters and the greater experience. That's what it takes to win. ... We're going to beat the Yankees. Any of my ball players will tell you that, and we expect to do it." Yankee skipper Miller Huggins retorted,

We're confident we're going to win. It'll be whichever team does the hitting, and we're sure we're going to do it. We're out of our hitting slump. We have a more experienced team and more experienced pitchers. We're about even in the strength of the infields, but ours is steadier. Our outfield is better, stronger and more experienced, and all the boys are cocky and ready to go. There's no doubt in their minds or in mine that the Yankees will win.

== Series summary ==
NL St. Louis Cardinals (4) vs. AL New York Yankees (3)

Game	Date	Score	Location	Time	Attendance
1	October 2	St. Louis Cardinals – 1, New York Yankees – 2	Yankee Stadium	1:48	61,658
2	October 3	St. Louis Cardinals – 6, New York Yankees – 2	Yankee Stadium	1:57	63,600
3	October 5	New York Yankees – 0, St. Louis Cardinals – 4	Sportsman's Park	1:41	37,708
4	October 6	New York Yankees – 10, St. Louis Cardinals – 5	Sportsman's Park	2:38	38,825
5	October 7	New York Yankees – 3, St. Louis Cardinals – 2 (10)	Sportsman's Park	2:28	39,552
6	October 9	St. Louis Cardinals – 10, New York Yankees – 2	Yankee Stadium	2:05	48,615
7	October 10	St. Louis Cardinals – 3, New York Yankees – 2	Yankee Stadium	2:15	38,093

== Matchups ==
=== Game 1 ===
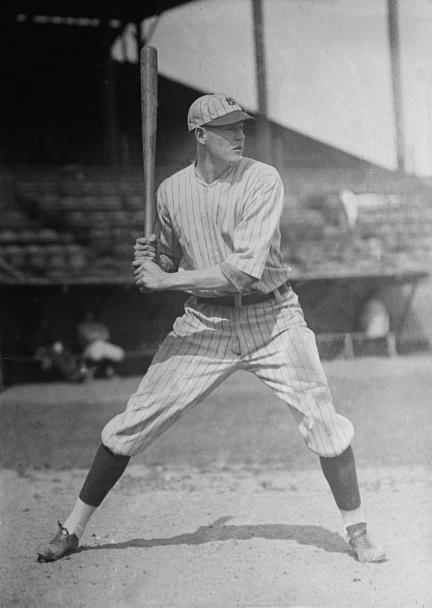
Yankee outfielder Bob Meusel in 1921

October 2, 1926 1:30 pm (ET) at Yankee Stadium in Bronx, New York
Team	1	2	3	4	5	6	7	8	9	R	H	E
St. Louis	1	0	0	0	0	0	0	0	0	1	3	1
New York	1	0	0	0	0	1	0	0	X	2	6	0
WP: Herb Pennock (1–0) LP: Bill Sherdel (0–1)

Yankee Stadium was filled with 61,658 fans on October 2 for Game 1. Those without tickets gathered at City Hall to watch the game's progress as charted on two large scoreboards. Before the start of the game, New York Supreme Court judge Robert F. Wagner, then a candidate for the United States Senate, threw out the ceremonial first pitch and took his position in the VIP box next to New York City mayor Jimmy Walker. Commissioner Landis and former heavyweight champion of the world Jack Dempsey were also in attendance. Southpaw Bill Sherdel started for the Cardinals, having posted a 16–12 record with 235 innings pitched in the regular season. The Yankees started Pennock, the team's only 20-game winner that season. The future Hall of Fame pitcher, nicknamed "The Knight of Kennett Square" for his hometown, had a 3.62 ERA in 266 1/3 innings during the regular season, and had finished third in the American League Most Valuable Player Award balloting behind winner George Burns and runner-up Johnny Mostil.

Taylor Douthit led off Game 1 with a double to left, advanced to third on Southworth's slow grounder to second baseman Tony Lazzeri, stayed there on Hornsby's comebacker right to Pennock but came home on "Sunny Jim" Bottomley's bloop single for the first run of the Series. In the bottom half, Sherdel walked Earle Combs, Babe Ruth and Bob Meusel, to load the bases. Gehrig scored Combs with a fielder's choice grounder for his first World Series run batted in (RBI), reaching first ahead of the relay. The Cardinals and Yankees were tied 1–1 after the first inning.

In the bottom of the third, Ruth singled and Meusel bunted him over, but Ruth split his pants sliding into second, prompting radio announcer Graham McNamee to exclaim, "Babe is the color of a red brick house!" Doc Woods, the team's trainer, ran out and sewed up Ruth's pants, much to the amusement of the crowd.

The score was still tied at one apiece in the bottom of the sixth, just as rain began to fall. Ruth lined a single past third baseman Les Bell. Meusel again sacrificed Ruth to second. Gehrig followed with a single, scoring Ruth and giving the Yankees the lead. Lazzeri lined a shot to left but Gehrig, on a headfirst dive, was tagged out at third by Bell. Lazzeri advanced to second on the throw. Bell bobbled Dugan's grounder for an error to put runners at first and third, but Hank Severeid forced Dugan at second to end the inning. The Yankees maintained their one-run advantage through the end of the eighth inning.

In the top of the ninth, Bottomley singled off Pennock but could not advance, giving the Yankees a 2–1 win in Game 1. Gehrig was their offensive star with both of his team's RBIs. Pennock went the distance, striking out four and yielding but three hits, two in the first and one in the ninth. Hard-luck loser Sherdel gave up only two runs and six hits while striking out one.

=== Game 2 ===
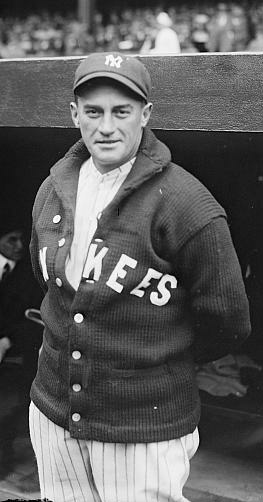
Yankees pitcher Urban Shocker

October 3, 1926 1:30 pm (ET) at Yankee Stadium in the Bronx, New York
Team	1	2	3	4	5	6	7	8	9	R	H	E
St. Louis	0	0	2	0	0	0	3	0	1	6	12	1
New York	0	2	0	0	0	0	0	0	0	2	4	0
WP: Grover Cleveland Alexander (1–0) LP: Urban Shocker (0–1); Home runs: STL: Billy Southworth (1), Tommy Thevenow (1); NYY: None

The second game was played the next day, October 3, at Yankee Stadium in front of a crowd of 63,600. Urban Shocker was the starting pitcher for the Yankees. With 19 wins and 11 losses, Shocker had the second-best pitching record on the team, behind the Game 1 starter, southpaw Herb Pennock. Shocker had a 3.38 ERA in 258 innings, along with 59 strikeouts in the 1926 season. The Cardinals' Game 2 starter was 39-year-old Grover Cleveland "Old Pete" Alexander, a veteran player in his 16th major league season. That season, he posted numbers considerably lower than the pitching season statistics from his prime in the late 1910s with the Philadelphia Phillies and Chicago Cubs. Alexander had compiled a 12–10 record in 200 innings, while posting a 3.05 ERA and 48 strikeouts, compared to the nearly 250 strikeouts he had in 1915 with the Phillies.

The Cardinals were first to bat in the game. After giving up a double to Rogers Hornsby, Shocker got a groundout from Jim Bottomley to end the run-scoring threat. In the Yankees' half of the inning, Mark Koenig grounded into a double play, and Babe Ruth followed by striking out. The Cardinals threatened again in the second inning, after back-to-back singles by catcher Bob O'Farrell and shortstop Tommy Thevenow. However, Alexander came to the plate and popped up to Koenig to end the inning. The Yankees scored first in the bottom of the second inning. Bob Meusel hit a single into center field, and Lou Gehrig followed by hitting a grounder to Alexander, which advanced Meusel to second base. Tony Lazzeri then hit a single to left field that scored Meusel from second. Joe Dugan followed with a single of his own, moving Lazzeri to third base. On the following play, Yankees catcher Hank Severeid struck out, and Lazzeri then attempted to steal home plate. Alexander made an error on his throw to catcher Bob O'Farrell, and Lazzeri was able to slide into home plate for the second Yankees run of the inning. O'Farrell then threw the ball to Thevenow, but the tag was late and Dugan was called safe at second base. The inning ended when Alexander struck out Shocker.

In the third inning, Taylor Douthit hit an infield single to shortstop Koenig, and Billy Southworth followed with a single to left field, advancing Douthit to second base. Hornsby laid down a sacrifice bunt to Shocker, moving each runner up a base. Bottomley hit a single into left field, scoring both Douthit and Southworth. The next two batters, Les Bell and Chick Hafey, hit into outs to conclude the inning. In the top of the seventh inning. Bob O'Farrell lined a double, and Tommy Thevenow followed with a single into left field. Pitcher Alexander popped up to Lazzeri, and Douthit followed with a fly ball to left field. Southworth then hit a three-run home run, giving the Cardinals a 5–2 advantage over the Yankees. Hornsby then grounded out to Koenig to end the inning. Gehrig, Lazzeri and Dugan all grounded out in the bottom of the seventh inning. In the top of the eighth, Bottomley hit a single into right field. Yankees manager Miller Huggins came out of the dugout and took Shocker out of the game, calling in Bob Shawkey from the bullpen to replace him. Shawkey struck out the first two batters he faced, and Bottomley was tagged out after attempting to steal second base. The Yankees could not produce any runs in their half of the inning.

In the ninth inning, Sad Sam Jones, a 22-year veteran in the American League, replaced Dutch Ruether, who had replaced pitcher Shawkey. Jones gave up an inside-the-park home run to Thevenow. Thevenow had only two other home runs in his career, both of which were inside-the-park and during the 1926 regular season. Jones then walked Douthit and Hornsby and gave up a single to Southworth. With the bases loaded and two outs in the top of the ninth inning, Bottomley hit a fly ball to center fielder Earle Combs. The Yankees did not score in the bottom of the ninth inning, and lost the game to the Cardinals by a 6–2 score. Alexander pitched a complete game, allowed hits in only two of the nine innings and did not allow a Yankee hit after the third inning. He also had a series-high 10 strikeouts, allowing four hits, one earned run and one walk. Meanwhile, the Yankees' starter Shocker allowed ten hits and five earned runs, including a home run, in seven innings of work. Shawkey had a perfect inning with two strikeouts, while Jones gave up two hits and allowed two walks in the ninth inning.

=== Game 3 ===
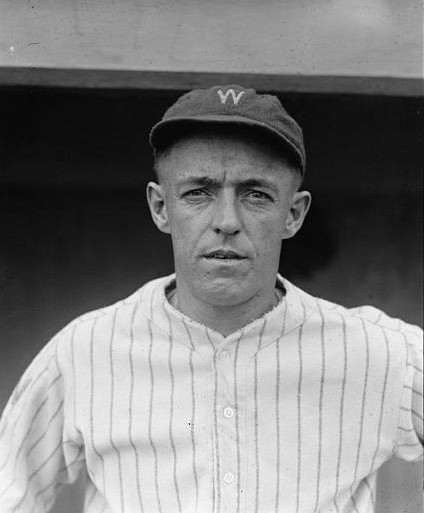
Yankees pitcher Dutch Ruether in 1925

October 5, 1926 1:30 pm (CT) at Sportsman's Park in St. Louis, Missouri
Team	1	2	3	4	5	6	7	8	9	R	H	E
New York	0	0	0	0	0	0	0	0	0	0	5	1
St. Louis	0	0	0	3	1	0	0	0	X	4	8	0
WP: Jesse Haines (1–0) LP: Dutch Ruether (0–1); Home runs: NYY: None; STL: Jesse Haines (1)

After Game 2 ended on October 3, the Yankees and Cardinals boarded trains to St. Louis, Missouri. The mayor of St. Louis, Victor J. Miller, ordered that the workday end by three the next afternoon so that the city could welcome the Cardinals at Union Station. The Cardinals players were treated like champions by fans and citizens alike. Just outside the station, Mayor Miller stood at a lectern and presented club manager and player Rogers Hornsby with a brand new Lincoln sedan priced at US$4,000 and paid for by the city's top businessmen. Each member of the Cardinals' team received a new hat, a new pair of shoes, and an engraved white-gold watch valued at a manufacturer's price of $100. As the Cardinals were receiving special treatment from the people of St. Louis, fans were lining up outside Sportsman's Park with the hope of being able to purchase tickets to Game 3 for a price of $3.30.

Sportsman's Park was filled with 37,708 people on October 5 for Game 3. On the mound for the Cardinals was right-handed knuckleball pitcher Jesse Haines, a future Hall of Famer with a 13–4 record and 3.25 ERA in 183 innings in 1926. Starting for the Yankees was southpaw pitcher Dutch Ruether, who had a 14–9 record with a 4.60 ERA in 1926.

The game was rain delayed for 30 minutes during the top half of the fourth inning. Once the game resumed, the Cardinals came to bat and scored the first runs of the game. Les Bell, a .325 hitter with 17 home runs that season, led the Cardinals with a single to center field. Chick Hafey dropped a sacrifice bunt straight to Ruether, who then threw it to second baseman Tony Lazzeri. Bell beat Lazzeri's tag at second base and was called safe by the umpire. Bob O'Farrell was walked, and Tommy Thevenow hit a grounder to Lazzeri, who tossed it to Mark Koenig for the force out at second base. Koenig tagged O'Farrell out, but made an error in his throw to first baseman Lou Gehrig, which resulted in a run. Then, Haines hit a Ruether pitch for a two-run home run.

The Cardinals were leading the Yankees 3–0 by the end of the inning. The Yankees failed to produce any offense in the fifth inning, but the Cardinals added to their lead by picking up a run when Billy Southworth beat the tag at home following a Jim Bottomley grounder to second base. Ruether was then replaced by Bob Shawkey, who closed out the inning by yielding two weak infield groundouts. The Yankees picked up one hit in each of the next two innings, but could not produce any runs. Yankees pitcher Myles Thomas came in to pitch a hitless ninth inning. With one out in the top of the ninth inning, Lou Gehrig hit a line drive single into right field, but Lazzeri grounded into a double play, ending the game as a 4–0 Cardinals victory. Haines pitched a complete-game shutout, and only gave up five hits total, two of which came from Gehrig.

=== Game 4 ===
October 6, 1926 1:30 pm (CT) at Sportsman's Park in St. Louis, Missouri
Team	1	2	3	4	5	6	7	8	9	R	H	E
New York	1	0	1	1	4	2	1	0	0	10	14	1
St. Louis	1	0	0	3	0	0	0	0	1	5	14	0
WP: Waite Hoyt (1–0) LP: Art Reinhart (0–1); Home runs: NYY: Babe Ruth 3 (3); STL: None

Future Hall of Famer Waite Hoyt started Game 4 for the Yankees at Sportsman's Park on October 6. Hoyt had a 16–12 record with a 3.85 ERA in 218 innings for the 1926 season. This was Hoyt's fourth World Series with the Yankees, and he entered the 1926 Series with over 35 innings of pitching experience in the championship series. He was opposed by Flint Rhem, the Cardinals' 20-game winner who had led the team with both a .741 winning percentage and 258 innings pitched.

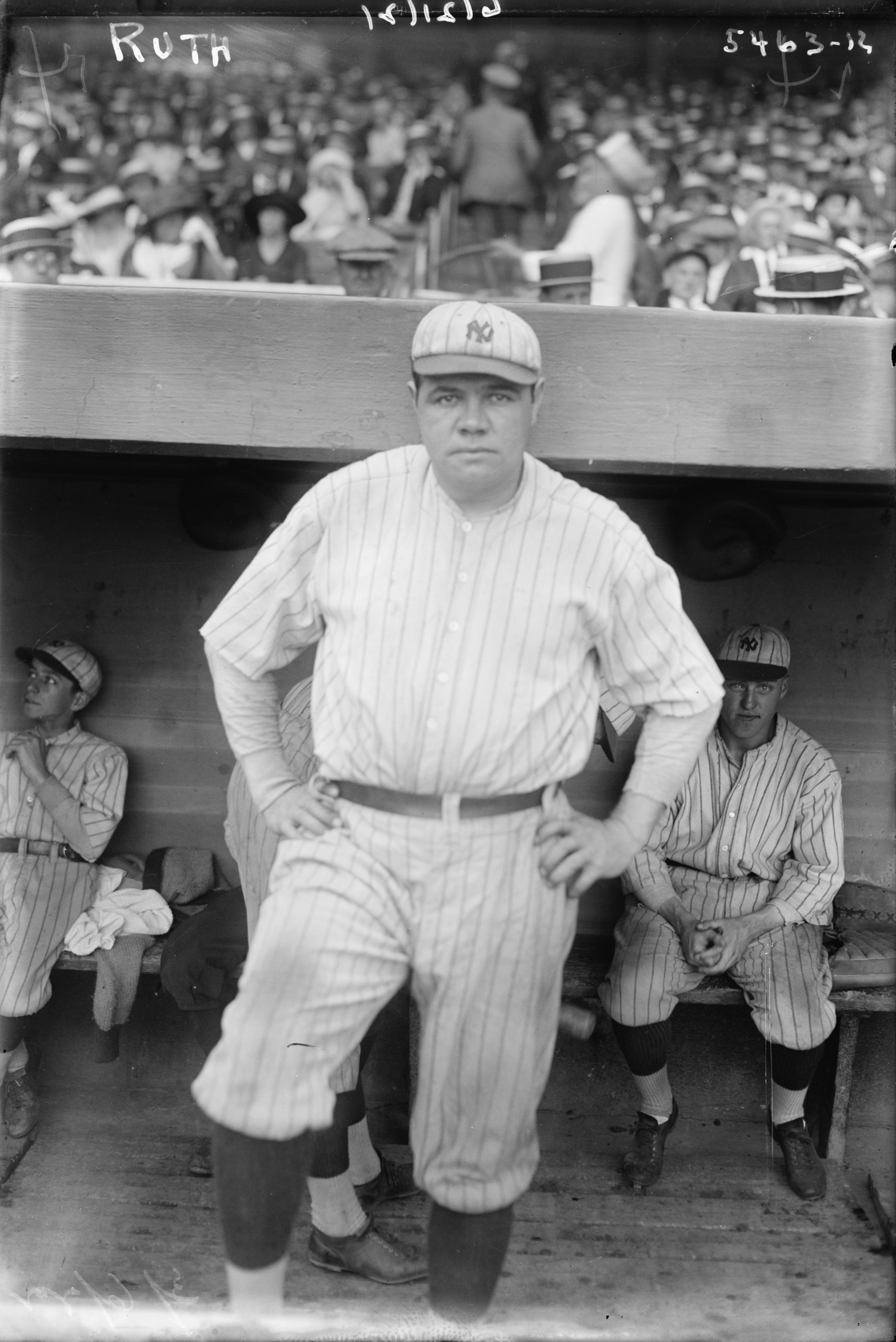
Babe Ruth in 1921

In the first inning, after striking out Earle Combs and Mark Koenig, Rhem gave up a home run to Babe Ruth. Bob Meusel was then walked, but was tagged out at home after attempting to score on a Lou Gehrig single. The Cardinals came into the bottom of the first with two straight singles to put runners at first and third base. Rogers Hornsby singled in Taylor Douthit to tie the game at 1–1 and moved Billy Southworth to second base. Jim Bottomley flied out to left field, and Les Bell followed with a sacrifice fly to center fielder Combs. With the go-ahead run at third base, Hornsby stole second, but Chick Hafey struck out to end to the Cardinals' run-scoring threat. Two innings later, Ruth came up to the plate with two outs and hit Rhem's pitch for a home run, his second of the game. Gehrig led off the next inning with a strikeout. Tony Lazzeri followed with a walk, and Joe Dugan hit a run-scoring double. Catcher Hank Severeid hit a single into center field, and Dugan ran towards home. He was tagged out at the plate by catcher Bob O'Farrell. The Yankees' starter Hoyt struck out to end the inning.

The Cardinals responded by scoring three runs in the bottom of the fourth inning. With one out and no runners on the bases, Hafey hit a single. O'Farrell followed and hit a ground ball towards Koenig that he bobbled, enabling O'Farrell and Hafey to reach first and second base, respectively. Tommy Thevenow followed with a double to right field that got by Meusel, scoring Hafey and moving O'Farrell to third base. Cardinals' manager Rogers Hornsby then put in left-handed infielder Specs Toporczer to pinch hit for Rhem, who was done pitching for the game. Toporczer hit a fly ball to Earle Combs in center field, upon which O'Farrell promptly tagged up to score another Cardinal run. With the game tied at three apiece and a runner at second base, Douthit hit a double in the outfield, which scored Thevenow. Southworth followed with a single to left fielder Ruth, and Douthit immediately tried to score. Ruth threw from left field to catcher Hank Severeid, who tagged Douthit out at home plate.

To start the top of the fifth inning, Art Reinhart was put in as pitcher. Reinhart walked Combs and followed by giving up a run-scoring double to Koenig. He then walked Ruth and Meusel in succession to load the bases for Gehrig. Reinhart walked Gehrig, allowing Koenig to score and keeping the bases loaded with no outs. Hi Bell replaced Reinhart as pitcher, but he was not able to suppress the Yankees' offense. Lazzeri hit a sacrifice fly to right field, which scored Ruth and moved Meusel up to third base. Dugan then hit a weak groundball; he was thrown out at first by catcher O'Farrell, but Meusel scored and Gehrig went to second base. Bell then balked, moving Gehrig to third base. Severeid was walked, and pitcher Hoyt ended the inning by hitting into a force play at second base.

The Yankees expanded on their three-run lead in the next inning. After the entire Yankees lineup batted in the fifth inning, Combs was back at the plate to start the sixth. Combs hit an infield single past shortstop Thevenow. Koenig followed by striking out. Ruth, with two home runs already in the game, came up to the plate. The count on Ruth went up to three balls and two strikes before he hit a long home run. Ruth's three home runs was a feat equaled only thrice since. As one of the game announcers (either McNamee or Carlin) described the situation:

The Babe is up. Two home runs today. One ball, far outside. Babe's shoulders look as if there is murder in them down there, the way he is swinging that bat down there. A high foul into the left-field stands. That great big bat of Babe's looks like a toothpick down there, he is so big himself. Here it is. Babe shot a bad one and fouled it. Two strikes and one ball. The outfield have all moved very far towards right. It is coming up now. A little too close. Two strikes and two balls. He has got two home runs and a base on balls so far today. Here it is, and a ball. Three and two. The Babe is waving that wand of his over the plate. Bell is loosening up his arm. The Babe is hit clear into the center-field bleachers for a home run! For a home run! Did you hear what I said? Where is that fellow who told me not to talk about Ruth anymore? Send him up here. Oh what a shot! Directly over second. The boys are all over him over there. One of the boys is riding on Ruth's back. Oh, what a shot! Directly over second base far into the bleachers out in center field, and almost on a line and then that dumbbell, where is he, who told me not to talk about Ruth! Oh, boy! Not that I love Ruth, but oh, how I love to see a shot like that! Wow! That is a world's series record, three home runs in one world's series game and what a home run! That was probably the longest hit ever in Sportsman's Park. They tell me this is the first ball ever hit in the center-field stand. That is a mile and half from here. You know what I mean.

It was measured at over 430 feet (130 m) and had cleared the 20 feet (6.1 m) wall in center field, crashing through the window of an auto dealer across the street from the stadium. Locals claimed it was the longest home run ever hit in St. Louis. Meusel then hit a single in right field, but was tagged out as he tried to head for second base. Gehrig followed with a double to the opposite side, but could not score when Lazzeri popped up to Thevenow to end the inning.

In the seventh inning, the Yankees faced a new pitcher, this time southpaw Bill Hallahan, who served as both a starter and reliever for the Cardinals. After Severeid singled and subsequently advanced on a sacrifice bunt by Hoyt, he scored on a double hit into left field by Combs. The Yankees led 10–4 and did not get any more runs or hits in the eighth or ninth inning. The Cardinals came up to bat in the bottom of the ninth inning with Hoyt trying to hold on to his six-run lead. Hornsby singled to right field and advanced to second base on the following play. He then ran home to score a run on a Les Bell single to center field. Hafey then popped up in foul territory, and Severeid made the catch. The game ended with a 10–5 score. Waite Hoyt pitched a complete game, allowing two earned runs on 14 hits while striking out eight batters. The Cardinals' five pitchers combined to give up 10 Yankee runs and 14 hits. With the series tied at two games apiece, both teams anticipated Game 5, which featured a rematch between Herb Pennock and Bill Sherdel.

==== Babe Ruth and Johnny Sylvester ====
The 1926 World Series produced one of the most famous anecdotes in baseball history, involving Babe Ruth and Johnny Sylvester. Sylvester was an 11-year-old boy from Essex Fells, New Jersey who was supposedly hospitalized after falling off a horse. Sylvester asked his father to get him a baseball autographed by Babe Ruth. Prior to the start of the World Series, the boy's parents sent urgent telegrams to the Yankees in St. Louis, asking for an autographed ball. Soon, the family received an airmail package with two balls, one autographed by the entire St. Louis Cardinals team and the other with signatures from a number of Yankees players and a personal message from Ruth saying, "I'll knock a homer for you on Wednesday". After Ruth hit three home runs in Game 4 on October 6, newspapers reported that Sylvester's condition had miraculously improved. After the World Series had ended, Ruth made a highly publicized visit to Sylvester's home, in which the boy said to Ruth, "I'm sorry the Yanks lost the series". In the spring of 1927, Sylvester's uncle visited Ruth and thanked him for saving the boy's life. Ruth asked how the boy was doing and asked the uncle to give the boy his regards. After the man left, Ruth, who was seated next to a group of baseball writers, said, "Now who the hell is Johnny Sylvester?"

There have been many alternate versions of this event. One version, which was later portrayed in The Babe Ruth Story, claims that Ruth went to Sylvester's hospital bed and promised him in person that he would hit a home run for him. On October 9, Ruth followed up on Sylvester and told him he would "try to knock you another homer, maybe two today". Differing newspaper reports from October 1926 claimed that Sylvester suffered from blood poisoning, a spinal infection, a sinus condition, or had a condition requiring a spinal fusion. Contemporary analyses dispute whether Sylvester was ever hospitalized, dying, or if Ruth's three home runs had actually saved the boy's life, as claimed by the newspapers.

=== Game 5 ===
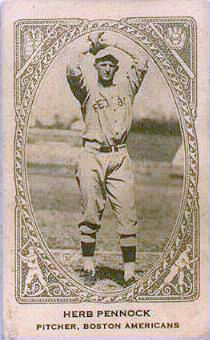
New York Yankees pitcher Herb Pennock on a 1922 baseball card

October 7, 1926 1:30 pm (CT) at Sportsman's Park in St. Louis, Missouri
Team	1	2	3	4	5	6	7	8	9	10	R	H	E
New York	0	0	0	0	0	1	0	0	1	1	3	9	1
St. Louis	0	0	0	1	0	0	1	0	0	0	2	7	1
WP: Herb Pennock (2–0) LP: Bill Sherdel (0–2)

Game 5, played at Sportsman's Park in St. Louis on October 7, featured a rematch between Game 1 starters Herb Pennock and Bill Sherdel. Pennock had pitched a complete game three-hitter in the 2–1 Yankees victory, while Sherdel had pitched seven innings, giving up two runs and six hits.

Through the first three innings of the fifth game, both pitchers held the opposing team to no runs and a limited number of hits. In the bottom of the fourth inning, the Cardinals cracked through Pennock's tough pitching. Jim Bottomley began by hitting a one-out double past left fielder Babe Ruth. Les Bell followed with a single to right field, scoring Bottomley. Chick Hafey then hit a fly ball caught in foul territory by Ruth, and Bell was called out while attempting to steal second base. In the top of the sixth inning, Pennock hit a line drive double into left field past Hafey. Cardinals' catcher Bob O'Farrell threw to Tommy Thevenow in hopes of picking off Pennock, who was standing a considerable distance away from second base. Thevenow made an error with his tag on Pennock, and Pennock was safe at second base. Earle Combs, the Yankees leadoff hitter, followed by drawing a walk. With runners at first and second base, Koenig hit a single to left fielder Hafey. Pennock scored on the play, and Combs moved to second base. Ruth then struck out, and Bob Meusel followed by hitting a sacrifice fly to right fielder Billy Southworth, on which Combs promptly advanced to third base. Lou Gehrig drew a walk to load the bases for Tony Lazzeri, who ended the inning by hitting a fly ball to center fielder Wattie Holm.

The Cardinals came back to take the lead in the bottom of the seventh inning. Bell led the inning by hitting a double into left field. After a Hafey fly out, O'Farrell hit a single to Ruth in left field, and Bell ran from second base to home to score the run and give the Cardinals a 2–1 advantage. In the top of the ninth inning, the Yankees tied up the game. Gehrig lined a double to left field, and Lazzeri bunted a single, advancing Gehrig to third base. Ben Paschal went in as a pinch-hitter for Joe Dugan and singled into center field, scoring Gehrig and advancing Lazzeri to second base. Severeid laid down a weak bunt, and Cardinals catcher O'Farrell threw to third base to make the force out on Lazzeri. With runners at first and second base, Pennock hit a groundball to shortstop Thevenow, who tossed it to second base to get the force out on Severeid. With Pennock at first base and Paschal at third base, Combs grounded to second base, ending the Yankees' hope of taking the lead. The Cardinals could not break the 2–2 tie in the bottom of the ninth inning, so the game went into extra innings.

The Yankees immediately took advantage of Sherdel in the top of the tenth inning. Koenig led things off by singling into left field. Sherdel threw a wild pitch to Ruth, and Koenig advanced to second base. Ruth then walked, and Meusel followed with a sacrifice bunt straight to pitcher Sherdel. Meusel was out at first base, but Ruth and Koenig were safe at second and third base, respectively. Gehrig was intentionally walked, loading the bases. Lazzeri hit a fly ball to left field, and Koenig tagged up on the play to score a run and give the Yankees a one-run lead. Mike Gazella, in place of Joe Dugan at third base, was hit by a pitch from Sherdel. With the bases loaded again, Severeid popped up to second baseman Rogers Hornsby to end the Yankee rally. The Cardinals got a single from Thevenow in the bottom of the tenth inning, but they could not score any runs. The game ended with the Yankees winning by a score of 3–2. Both Pennock and Sherdel pitched ten-inning complete games. Sherdel gave up nine hits and two earned runs, while walking five and striking out two. Pennock finished the game giving up just seven hits and two runs, while striking out four batters.

=== Game 6 ===
October 9, 1926 1:30 pm (ET) at Yankee Stadium in Bronx, New York
Team	1	2	3	4	5	6	7	8	9	R	H	E
St. Louis	3	0	0	0	1	0	5	0	1	10	13	2
New York	0	0	0	1	0	0	1	0	0	2	8	1
WP: Grover Cleveland Alexander (2–0) LP: Bob Shawkey (0–1); Home runs: STL: Les Bell (1); NYY: None

The teams moved back to Yankee Stadium for Game 6. Over 48,000 fans came into Yankee Stadium on October 9 to see if the Yankees could win their second World Series in franchise history. The game's pitching matchup was between Grover Cleveland Alexander and Bob Shawkey, both of whom had made appearances in previous games in the series. Shawkey had come in as relief in Games 2 and 3, while Alexander had pitched a complete game against the Yankees in the Cardinals' Game 2 victory. In the 1926 season, Shawkey had made most of his pitching appearances in relief, and had been an occasional starter on the Yankees rotation. He started 10 of his 29 total pitching appearances and posted an 8–7 record with a 3.62 earned run average.

The game was lopsided from the start. In the top of the first inning, Shawkey gave up three runs on three hits, with the runs coming from a Jim Bottomley double and Les Bell single. Alexander encountered a minor setback in the fourth inning. To open up the bottom of the inning, Bob Meusel launched a triple into left field and scored on the following ground out by Lou Gehrig. Alexander shut down the Yankees for the rest of the inning, and the Cardinals held on to a 3–1 lead. In the top of the fifth inning, the Cardinals expanded their two-run lead. Tommy Thevenow hit a single to left fielder Babe Ruth. Alexander laid down a sacrifice bunt and was tagged out by first baseman Gehrig, but was successful in advancing Thevenow to second base. Wattie Holm, substituting for Taylor Douthit as center fielder, followed by hitting a single into center field, scoring Thevenow on the play. Billy Southworth and Rogers Hornsby followed with groundouts in the infield to end the inning.

The Cardinals scored again in the top of the seventh inning. Thevenow again led the inning by hitting a single into left field. Alexander bunted right in front of the plate. Yankees catcher Hank Severeid made the throw to second baseman Tony Lazzeri, but Lazzeri made an error on the play, and both runners were safe at their respective bases. Holm followed by hitting a weak grounder that led to a force out of Thevenow at third base. With runners at first and second base, Southworth lined a double right by Ruth, scoring Alexander and sending Holm to third base. Urban Shocker, the starter in Game 2, then came in to relieve Shawkey as pitcher. Shocker gave up a single to Hornsby into center field, allowing Holm and Southworth to score. Bottomley then hit a grounder to shortstop Mark Koenig, who stepped on second base to get Hornsby out on the force play. Bell followed with a two-run home run, extending the Cardinals' lead to 9–1. Chick Hafey lined a double into left field, but Bob O'Farrell ended the inning by striking out. In the bottom of the seventh inning, the Yankees scored one run on an Earle Combs single to cut the Cardinals' lead to seven runs.

In the eighth inning, Myles Thomas came in to relieve Shocker, who had given up three hits and two unearned runs in less than an inning of work. Meanwhile, Alexander shut down the Yankees offense for the rest of the game. In the top of the ninth inning, the Cardinals increased their lead back to eight runs after Hornsby had an RBI groundout, scoring Southworth. Alexander finished with his second complete game of the series and gave up only two runs on eight hits, while striking out six batters. The three Yankee pitchers combined to give up 13 hits, seven earned runs, three unearned runs, and one home run.

=== Game 7 ===
October 10, 1926 1:30 pm (ET) at Yankee Stadium in Bronx, New York
Team	1	2	3	4	5	6	7	8	9	R	H	E
St. Louis	0	0	0	3	0	0	0	0	0	3	8	0
New York	0	0	1	0	0	1	0	0	0	2	8	3
WP: Jesse Haines (2–0) LP: Waite Hoyt (1–1) Sv: Grover Cleveland Alexander (1); Home runs: STL: None; NYY: Babe Ruth (4)

The deciding Game 7 was played on October 10, 1926, at Yankee Stadium in front of a crowd of 38,093 people. The game featured two future Hall of Famers, who were both winners in their respective pitching appearances earlier in the series. Jesse Haines took to the mound for the Cardinals; he had pitched in relief in Game 1 and threw a complete-game shutout against the Yankees in Game 3. Waite Hoyt had pitched a complete-game 10–5 Yankees victory in Game 4.

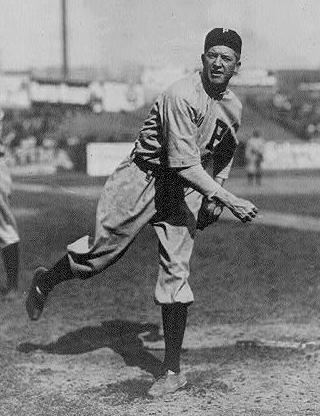
Cardinals pitcher Grover Cleveland Alexander in 1915

The Yankees scored the first run of the game in the third inning on a Babe Ruth home run into the right field bleachers. In the following half inning, the Cardinals came back to take a 3–1 lead over the Yankees. Jim Bottomley lined a one-out single into left field to start the Cardinals' fourth inning rally. Les Bell just barely made it to first base after shortstop Mark Koenig accidentally kicked the ball while trying to field it. With runners at first and second base, Chick Hafey hit a bloop single into left field, which loaded up the bases for catcher Bob O'Farrell. This time, left fielder Bob Meusel made an error by dropping O'Farrell's fly ball, so Bottomley scored to tie the game, and the bases remained loaded. Tommy Thevenow followed with a two-run single to right fielder Ruth. Hoyt struck out the next batter, and Wattie Holm hit into a force play at second base. All three runs in the inning were charged as unearned on Hoyt, due to the two Yankee errors.

In the sixth inning, the Yankees cut the Cardinals' lead. With two outs, Joe Dugan hit a single. Hank Severeid followed with a double, scoring Dugan, before pinch-hitter Ben Paschal grounded to Haines to end the inning. Game 1 and 5 winner Herb Pennock came in relief for Hoyt in the seventh inning. He yielded only one hit in the inning and limited the Cardinals to their 3–2 lead. In the bottom half of the inning, the Yankees loaded up the bases with Earle Combs, Ruth and Lou Gehrig. At this point, there were two outs, and Haines had developed a blister on his pitching hand, and could no longer pitch in the game.

Rogers Hornsby had to determine who he would put in to replace Haines as pitcher. Although Grover Cleveland Alexander had pitched a complete game the day before and may have spent the night drinking (Alexander later denied this, saying that Hornsby specifically told him to limit his celebrating since he might be needed the next day), Hornsby decided to trust him after Alexander said he "had it in easy in there" in Game 6 and would be ready whenever Hornsby needed him. According to the popular legend, Alexander told Hornsby his strategy: After getting a strike on Lazzeri, Alexander would then throw an inside fastball. Hornsby warned him that that pitch was Lazzeri's favorite. Alexander responded that if Lazzeri swung at it, he would hit it foul, and Alexander would then throw an outside curve to strike him out. Hornsby then supposedly said, "Who am I to tell you how to pitch?" The first two pitches thrown by Alexander to batter Tony Lazzeri went for a strike and a ball, respectively. On the third pitch, Lazzeri hit a fly ball down the left-field line. The ball initially appeared to be going into the stands for a grand slam, but at the last second, it curved several feet into the stands in foul territory. Alexander then threw a curveball that Lazzeri swung at and missed for strike three, ending the inning and the Yankees' threat.

Alexander retired the Yankees in order in the eighth inning. The Cardinals did nothing offensively in the top of the ninth inning, so it was up to Alexander to preserve the Cardinals' game in the bottom of the ninth. Alexander got the first two batters of the inning, Combs and Dugan, to ground out to third baseman Bell. With two outs and no runners on base, Alexander faced Ruth. Ruth had hit a solo home run and walked three times in the game. Manager Hornsby walked to the mound to talk with Alexander. Alexander told Hornsby that he would rather face Ruth than intentionally walk him. Alexander's first pitch to Ruth fell in for a solid strike in the middle of the plate. Alexander's next pitch fell outside of the strike zone for ball one. Ruth then fouled the next pitch, making the count one ball and two strikes. Alexander's next two pitches fell too low for balls two and three, making it a full count. The following full count pitch was noted by New York Herald Tribune sportswriter W. O. McGeehan: "The count went to three and two, Ruth was swaying eagerly. The soupbone creaked again. The ball seemed a fraction of an inch from being a strike. Ruth paused a moment. Even he was uncertain. Then he trotted down to first."

With two outs and Ruth at first base, left fielder Bob Meusel came up to the plate, with Lou Gehrig waiting in the batting circle after him. Meusel was a .315 hitter that year and had batted in 81 runs in just over 100 regular-season games. Meusel also had success in Game 6 against Alexander, with a double and triple. Just as Meusel was about to take his first pitch, Ruth made the bold move of trying to steal second base. Ruth was known as a good but overly aggressive baserunner, with about a 50% success rate at stealing bases in his career, and his attempt surprised many people throughout the stadium. Meusel swung and missed, and Cardinals catcher Bob O'Farrell immediately threw the ball to second baseman Hornsby. Hornsby reached for the ball, and laid the tag immediately on Ruth. As radio announcer Graham McNamee described it: "Ruth is again walked, for the fourth time today. One strike on Bob Meusel. Going down to second! The game is over! Babe tried to steal second and is put out, catcher to second!"

As Hornsby recalled later, Ruth "didn't say a word. He didn't even look around or up at me. He just picked himself up and walked away". Ruth's failed attempt to steal second base ended the 1926 World Series; it is the only time a World Series has ended with a runner being caught stealing. Ruth explained later that he attempted to steal second base because he thought no one would expect it. He hoped that by getting to second base, he could have an easier chance at scoring if Meusel hit a single into the outfield.

In 2019, Dan Holmes of BaseballEgg.com wrote that a contemporary article from The Sporting News described the stolen base attempt as a failed hit-and-run, called by Meusel, rather than Babe Ruth's own idea.

== Aftermath ==
The Cardinals went back home to St. Louis to a rapturous fan reception, having won their first undisputed world championship. Each member of the championship team collected $5,584.51, while the Yankees' players were given $3,417.75 each.

To date, the Cardinals' 11 world championships are the most won by any National League team, and rank second only to the Yankees' 27. The Cardinals' and Yankees' last wins were within two years of each other (having occurred in 2011 and 2009, respectively). The two teams would meet again in 1928 (which the Yankees swept in four games); 1942 (which the Cardinals won in five games); 1943 (which the Yankees won in five games); and 1964 (which the Cardinals won in seven games).

As for the Yankees, Game 7 of the 1926 series marked the last postseason loss for the team in a decade. The Bronx Bombers would go on to sweep their next three World Series, 1927, 1928, and 1932. Their next World Series loss would be Game 1 of the 1936 World Series which the Yankees would eventually win 4 games to 2.

== Composite line score ==
Team	1	2	3	4	5	6	7	8	9	10	R	H	E
St. Louis Cardinals	5	0	2	10	2	0	9	0	3	0	31	65	5
New York Yankees	2	2	2	2	4	5	2	0	1	1	21	54	7
Total attendance: 328,051 Average attendance: 46,864; Winning player's share: $5,585 Losing player's share: $3,418

== See also ==
- 1926 Negro World Series
- 1928 World Series Second World Series match-up between the Cardinals and the Yankees
- Golden pitch
