= Graham McNamee =

American radio broadcaster (1888–1942)

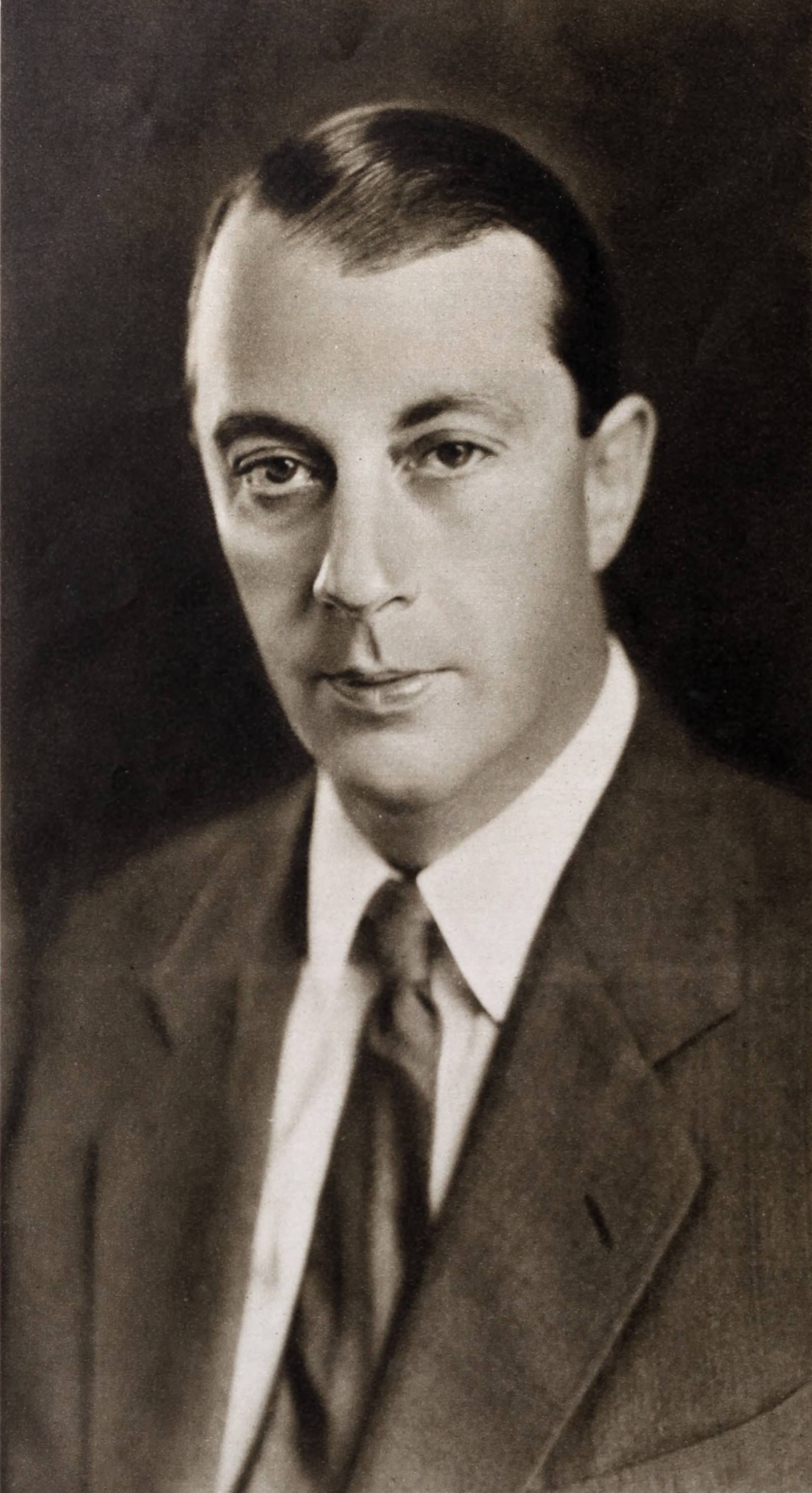
- McNamee c. 1932
- Born: Thomas Graham McNamee; July 10, 1888; Washington, D.C., U.S.
- Died: May 9, 1942 (aged 53); New York City, U.S.
- Occupation: Radio broadcaster

Thomas Graham McNamee (July 10, 1888 – May 9, 1942) was an American radio broadcaster, the medium's most recognized national personality in its first international decade. He originated play-by-play sports broadcasting for which he was awarded the Ford C. Frick Award by the Baseball Hall of Fame in 2016.

== Early life and career ==
Graham McNamee's father, John B. McNamee, was an attorney and legal advisor to President Grover Cleveland's cabinet, and his mother, Anne, was a homemaker, who also sang in a church choir. Born in Washington, D.C., and raised in St. Paul, Minnesota, McNamee had early aspirations of being an opera singer. He studied voice as a youth and sang in churches, and in 1922 gave a concert in Aeolian Hall, New York.

In 1922, while serving jury duty in New York City, he visited the studios of radio station WEAF en route to the courthouse and, on a whim, went to audition as a singer. Someone noticed his voice and asked him to speak through a microphone. He was given an audition after which he was hired on the spot as a staff announcer.

Along with fellow WEAF announcer Phillips Carlin, whose voice was so similar very few listeners could tell them apart, McNamee quickly became famous. Over the course of the next decade McNamee worked for WEAF, and for the national NBC network, when WEAF became its flagship station.

== Sportscasting ==
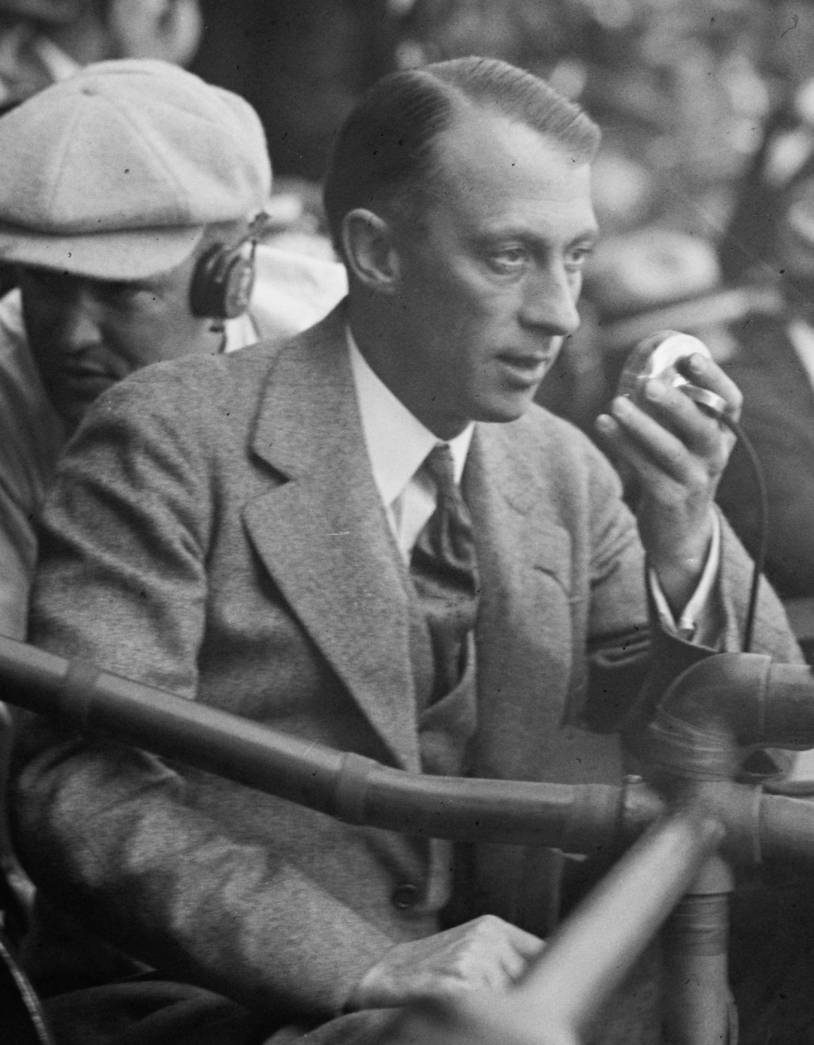
McNamee at the 1924 World Series

McNamee became well known for his broadcasts of numerous major sports events, including several World Series, Rose Bowl games, championship boxing matches, and Indianapolis 500 races.

Radio broadcasting of sporting events was an entirely new thing in the 1920s. The announcers were a rotating group of newspaper writers. At the time baseball was America's most popular sport, and the reporters were at the games to write stories about them for print newspapers. Their descriptions were matter-of-fact, boring at best, had a lot of dead air, mostly given in the past tense after a play was completed.^{[Example 1]} In 1923, announcer McNamee was assigned to help the sportswriters with their broadcasts.

One day, Grantland Rice, told McNamee to finish the game on his own, and left. McNamee was not a trained sports writer, so he immediately began to describe exactly what he was seeing as it happened, thus originating play-by-play^{[Example 2]} sports broadcasting. He wasn't a baseball expert, but had a knack for conveying what he saw in great detail, and with great enthusiasm, bringing the sights and sounds of the game into the homes of listeners. McNamee co-announced the first coast-to-coast radio broadcast of a World Series game in 1926 with Phillips Carlin.

In 1927 he broadcast the Long Count Fight between Gene Tunney and Jack Dempsey with Phillips Carlin to more than 60 NBC radio stations. When a colleague asked him, shortly before his passing, what his favorite piece of commentary was, McNamee mentioned Babe Ruth's called shot in the 1932 World Series.

== Other work ==
McNamee also broadcast the national political conventions, the presidential inaugurations, and the arrival of aviator Charles Lindbergh in New York City following his transatlantic flight to Paris, France, in 1927. He opened each broadcast by saying, "Good afternoon, ladies and gentlemen of the radio audience. This is Graham McNamee speaking."

He was featured on the cover of the October 3, 1927, issue of Time magazine.

McNamee continued to broadcast into the 1930s, as an announcer on such weekly programs as Rudy Vallee's, and Ed Wynn's. He played straight man on the latter, reacting to Wynn's gags.

He worked in motion pictures, narrating Krakatoa (1933), Universal Pictures' weekly Universal Newsreels, and Camera Thrills (1935), an Academy Award-nominated short subject produced and directed by Charles E. Ford. He also appeared as the announcer at the beginning of The Phantom of Crestwood (1932).

On April 20, 1936, he also worked in Circus stars bring joy to hospital's little shut-ins (clowns and performers of Ringling Brothers Barnum and Bailey Circus performed at Bellevue Hospital in New York to amuse children), by Universal Newsreel. In the same year, on July 7, he was briefly reunited with Ed Wynn for an ad-libbed spot on an experimental, NBC television broadcast.

In the early 1940s his principal activity was as a newsreel commentator, but he maintained much of his radio work as well, hosting Behind the Mike for NBC.

== Personal life ==
He was married twice: the first time, in 1921, to concert and church soprano Josephine Garrett. They were divorced in 1932, and he married Anne Lee Sims in 1934.

== Death ==
McNamee died on May 9, 1942, at St. Lukes Hospital at the age of 53. The cause of death was a brain embolism after he had been hospitalized with a streptococcus infection. He was buried in Mount Calvary Cemetery in Columbus, Ohio.

== Legacy ==
In his foreword to McNamee's 1926 memoir You're on the Air, journalist Heywood Broun paid tribute to McNamee's role as a pioneer in the then-nascent field of commercial broadcasting:

McNamee justified the whole activity of radio broadcasting. A thing may be a marvelous invention and still dull as ditch water. It will be that unless it allows the play of personality. A machine amounts to nothing much unless a man can ride. Graham McNamee has been able to take a new medium of expression and through it transmit himself—to give out vividly a sense of movement and of feeling. Of such is the kingdom of art.

== Awards ==
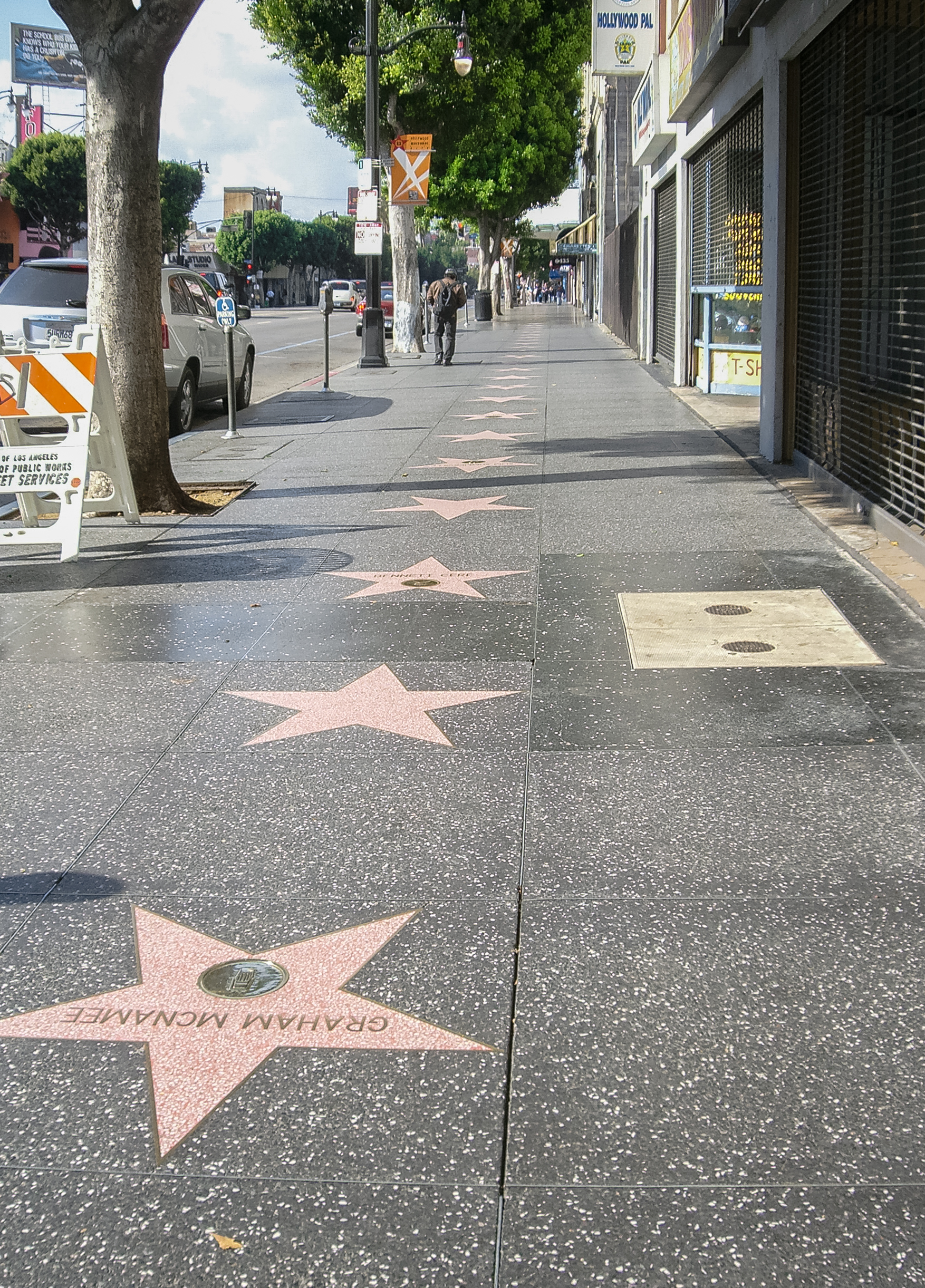
McNamee's star (lower left) on the Hollywood Walk of Fame

In 1925, at the Radio World Fair, McNamee won a solid gold cup (designed like a microphone) as America's most popular announcer, receiving 189,470 votes out of 1,161,659 votes cast.

In February 1960, McNamee was posthumously recognized with a star on the Hollywood Walk of Fame.

In 1964, McNamee was inducted into the National Sportscasters and Sportswriters Association Hall of Fame.

In 1984, he was part of the American Sportscasters Association Hall of Fame's inaugural class, which included sportscasting legends Red Barber, Don Dunphy, Ted Husing and Bill Stern.

The National Radio Hall of Fame inducted McNamee in 2011.

On December 9, 2015, McNamee was named the 2016 recipient of the Ford C. Frick Award by the National Baseball Hall of Fame and Museum, presented during the Hall's induction weekend in July.

== Cultural references ==
McNamee is portrayed by actor Dayton Lummis in The Winning Team, the 1952 film biography of Grover Cleveland Alexander.

== Notes ==
^{1} "The batter just hit a long fly to right field for a sacrifice out. The baserunner safely advanced from second to third."
^{2} "With no outs and a runner on second, the manager will call for a sacrifice fly. The pitcher looks over his shoulder at second, turns, takes his stance, and delivers. It is a fastball, hit cleanly into deep right field. The fielder is backpeddling rapidly, and the runner is holding at second. He makes the catch, one out. The runner takes off for third. Here comes the throw, the runner slides, and is SAFE! The crowd cheers wildly. The play was beautifully executed."
