= The Atwater Kent Hour =

American classical music radio program (1925–34)

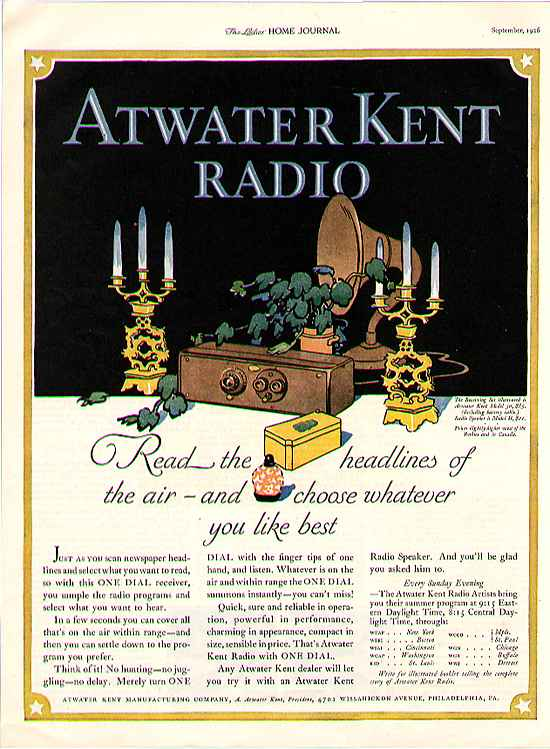

The Atwater Kent Hour (a.k.a. The Atwater Kent Radio Hour) was a top-rated radio concert music program heard on NBC and CBS from October 4, 1925, to December 17, 1934, with stars of the Metropolitan Opera often making appearances. Classical music was performed by a large symphony orchestra under the direction of Josef Pasternack. Soprano Frances Alda was often the featured vocalist, and soprano Mary Eastman also performed. The opening theme music was "Now the Day Is Over," by Sabine Baring-Gould (words) and Sir Joseph Barnby (music).

The series was sponsored by the manufacturer of radio receivers, Atwater Kent. The company's factory was located at 4745 Wissahickon Avenue in North Philadelphia. The radio program paralleled the rise of the Atwater Kent Manufacturing Company, as noted in the history provided by the Atwater Kent Museum of Philadelphia:

In 1922 Kent produced his first radio components and in 1923 his first complete radios. By 1924 the company had outgrown its Stenton Avenue campus and moved to a new $2 million plant on Wissahickon Avenue. This plant, constructed in sections, would eventually cover 32 acres. In 1925 the Atwater Kent Manufacturing Company became the largest maker of radios in the nation. Supporting the manufacture of radios was The Atwater Kent Hour, a program broadcast throughout the country in the mid-1920s. The show featured top entertainment and became one of the most popular and acclaimed regular radio programs of the era. In 1929 the company reached its peak performance with over 12,000 employees manufacturing nearly one million radio sets. The plant itself was an architectural sensation and received hundreds of visitors annually.

Announcer Phillips Carlin

Produced and directed by William Spier, the program was one of the highest rated evening shows. During the 1930–31 season, The Atwater Kent Hour ranked third (after Amos 'n' Andy and Rudy Vallee). The announcer was Phillips Carlin, who also announced for The Goodrich Hour and The Palmolive Hour.

== Listen to ==
- Atwater Kent radio commercial
