= Camera Thrills =

1935 short film

- Written by: Charles E. Ford
- Produced by: Charles E. Ford
- Narrated by: Graham McNamee
- Distributed by: Universal Pictures
- Release date: September 1, 1935
- Running time: 25 minutes
- Country: United States
- Language: English

Camera Thrills is a 1935 American short film produced by Charles E. Ford. It was nominated for an Academy Award at the 8th Academy Awards in 1936 for Best Short Subject (Novelty). The Academy Film Archive preserved Camera Thrills in 2012.
