= Phillips Carlin =

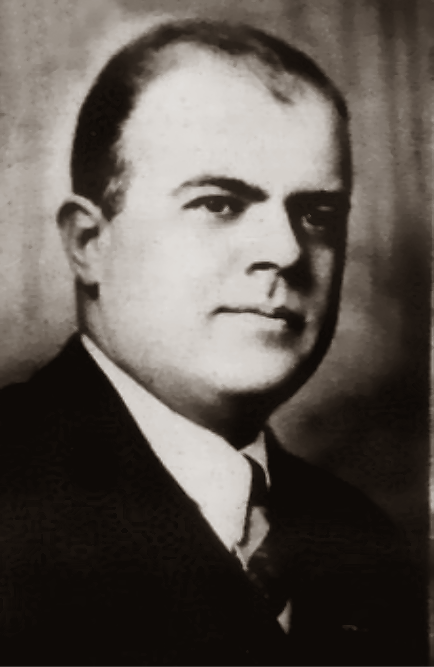
- Carlin around 1927
- Born: June 30, 1894; New York City, New York, U.S.
- Died: August 27, 1971, age 77; Guilford, Connecticut, U.S.
- Occupations: Announcer, broadcast executive
- Spouse: Claire (Wilhelm)
- Children: 2
- Parent(s): Wayland and Laura Carlin

Phillips Carlin (June 30, 1894 – August 27, 1971) was an American radio broadcaster, a radio executive, and later, a television executive.

== Early years ==
"Phil" Carlin was the oldest son of Wayland and Laura Carlin. He graduated from DeWitt Clinton High School in the Bronx, and then attended New York University, where he excelled in debate. He graduated Magna Cum Laude in 1916, having received honors in French, as well as a top prize for oration. After graduating, he enrolled in the U.S. Navy during World War I, where he became an officer, but when he came home, he was uncertain about which career to pursue. Ultimately, he gravitated towards the new medium of broadcasting, and was hired at New York City's WEAF in 1923.

== Radio ==
Carlin at the microphone, circa 1924

Carlin officially joined WEAF as an announcer on November 23, 1923. He was on the air from 1923 to 1926, and soon became the station's program manager. When WEAF was bought by the National Broadcasting Company, he rose to become a network executive. Carlin also became known for covering sports. He teamed up with Graham McNamee to broadcast college football games, including the Harvard-Yale game in 1925; an early example of chain broadcasting, the game was carried by 13 stations. Carlin and McNamee also collaborated to announce the 1926, 1927 and 1928 World Series, as well as boxing matches, including The Long Count Fight between Jack Dempsey and Gene Tunney in 1927. On some occasions, Carlin covered college football games without McNamee. In addition, Carlin covered news and current events, including the 1924 Democratic National Convention and a 1927 reception in New York to honor aviator Charles Lindbergh. He later announced several musical variety programs, including The Atwater Kent Hour, The Goodrich Hour and The Palmolive Hour. In 1927, Carlin became convinced that NBC programs needed a definitive and consistent ending, to help affiliates know when it was okay to break away from the network for commercials or local announcements. Many stations were already using chimes, gongs or other sounds to signal that a program was over; Carlin liked the idea of chimes, and working with Oscar B. Hanson, NBC's director of engineering and a former AT&T engineer, as well as Earnest la Prada, an NBC orchestra leader, they created what became the famous 3 tones known as the NBC Chimes.

Carlin subsequently rose to NBC's Eastern program manager and then program manager of the entire NBC Red network; he was subsequently moved over to NBC Blue, where he held a similar post. In addition, during the mid-to-late 1930s, he was the executive in charge of NBC's sustaining programs division. During his time as a program manager at NBC, he was credited with introducing a number of soon-to-be famous performers to the radio audience, including Dinah Shore, the Ink Spots, and Dorothy Lamour. After NBC was ordered by the FCC to divest from NBC Blue, Carlin left NBC in mid-November 1944. He soon joined the Mutual Broadcasting System, where he became the network's vice president in charge of programs. In November 1948, nearly forty of his peers, including radio executives, journalists, and former announcers, honored him with a dinner and a tribute on his 25th anniversary in radio. Carlin continued working as Mutual's vice president of programming until March 1949, when he unexpectedly resigned. For a while, he worked as a radio consultant, before getting into television, where he also worked as a consultant.

== Television ==
While still at Mutual radio, Carlin, who was then the vice president in charge of programming, had conceived the idea for Queen for a Day; it debuted on Mutual on April 30, 1945. Carlin became known for daytime programs featuring audience participation, as well as programs like Queen for a Day where participants could win big prizes. Some of the programs he launched on radio became popular TV shows; some TV critics have credited Queen for a Day with being one of the earliest examples of reality TV. After leaving radio in 1949, Carlin established a radio-television consultancy, specializing in program development and syndication. He also advised advertising agencies. Subsequently, Carlin worked as a television production representative for advertising agencies, where he also produced commercials.

== Final years ==
Carlin retired from television in 1964. He died at his home in Guilford, Connecticut, after having a heart attack; he was 77. He left his wife Claire (née Wilhelm) and their two daughters.
