= Johnny Sylvester =

American businessman

John Dale Sylvester
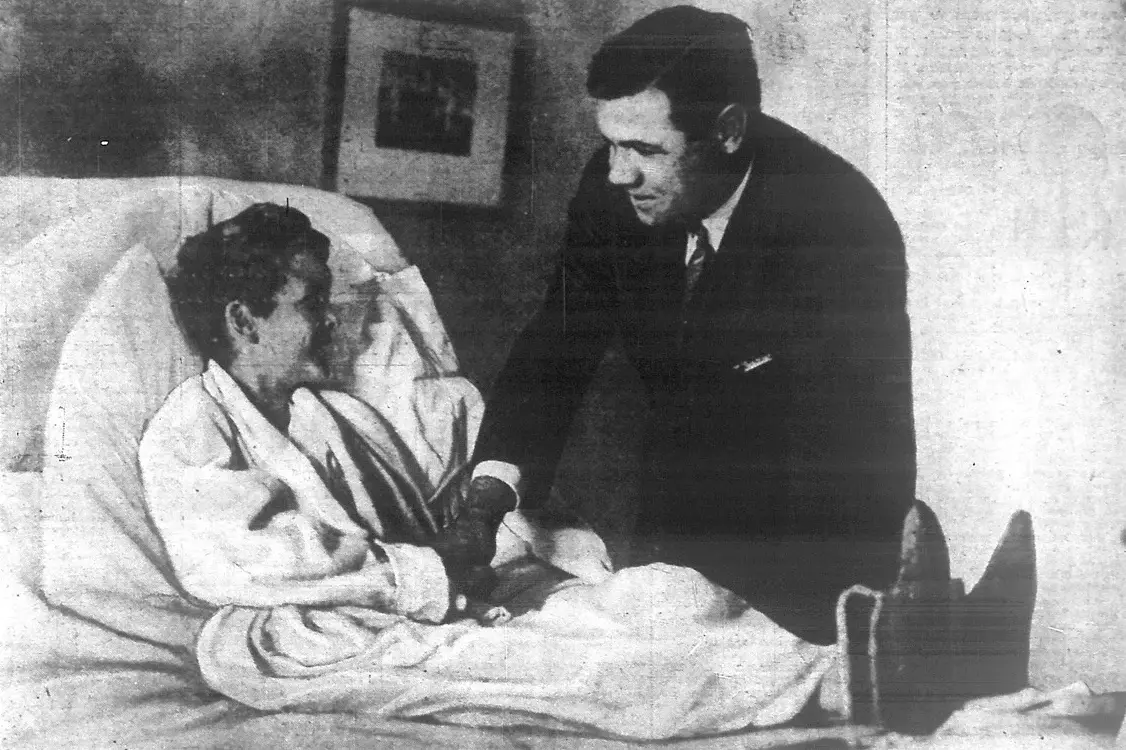
- Sylvester meeting Babe Ruth in 1926 while ill
- Born: April 5, 1915; Caldwell, New Jersey
- Died: January 8, 1990 (aged 74); Mineola, New York
- Education: Princeton University
- Occupation: Packaging machinery executive
- Known for: Promised home run while seriously ill by Babe Ruth

John Dale Sylvester (April 5, 1915 – January 8, 1990) was an American packaging machinery company executive who was best known for a promise made to him as a child by Babe Ruth during the 1926 World Series, when Sylvester was seriously ill and hospitalized. Ruth said he would hit a home run on his behalf, which was followed by what was widely reported at the time as Sylvester's miraculous recovery.

== Early life ==
Sylvester was born on April 5, 1915, in Caldwell, New Jersey. His father, Horace Clapp Sylvester Jr., was a banker who by 1926 was a vice president at National City Bank and served as head of its municipal department. Sylvester grew up in Caldwell and moved with his family to a large house in Essex Fells, New Jersey, in 1921. At Essex Fells Grammar School, his baseball skills led to his nickname as the "Babe Ruth Kid" and he was a diehard fan of the New York Yankees and its star player, Babe Ruth.

== Injury and Babe Ruth ==
During the summer of 1926, while at a rented house on the Jersey Shore in Bay Head, New Jersey, Sylvester was horseback riding. He was thrown to the ground along with his horse, after the horse stepped into a hole. The horse tried to stand up and kicked Sylvester in the head. The injury progressed over the summer. In September, he was diagnosed with osteomyelitis in his skull, a condition that is caused by an infection that leads to bone deterioration. Doctors thought that his condition could lead to his death.

The condition was only one of several that Sylvester was said to be ailing from at the time, which was also variously ascribed to a back problem, blood poisoning, a sinus condition, and either a spinal infection or spinal fusion. The confusion as to the condition affecting Sylvester has led to claims that the entire incident was a hoax.

Urgent telegrams were sent to Ruth, who was then with the Yankees playing the St. Louis Cardinals in the 1926 World Series. It has been unclear if Sylvester initiated the request himself, or if it had been the idea of his father or uncle as an effort to lift his spirits. Ruth sent back from St. Louis a package that included two balls, one autographed by members of the Yankees and the other by players from the Cardinals. Inscribed on the ball was a note from Ruth that read, "I'll knock a homer for you on Wednesday", referring to the forthcoming Game 4 of the series.

After Ruth hit three home runs in Game 4 on October 6, newspapers reported that Sylvester's condition had improved. After the Yankees lost the series in seven games, The New York Times reported on how "'Dr.' Babe Ruth Calls On His Boy Patient", visiting Sylvester at his home in Essex Fells, with Sylvester telling Ruth "I'm sorry the Yanks lost".

The incident was featured in the 1948 biopic The Babe Ruth Story, but the film took liberties with important facts. First, the film portrayed Ruth visiting Sylvester during the 1932 World Series against the Chicago Cubs rather than the 1926 World Series vs the Cardinals. Second, the film has Ruth visiting the Sylvester home in Gary, Indiana, in person and shows Ruth in the boy's bedroom, telling Johnny that he will hit a home run if Johnny hangs in there, rather than sending autographed baseballs and a note to Johnny in New Jersey.

In the 1942 movie The Pride of the Yankees, Gary Cooper portrays Lou Gehrig, who promises a sick youth named Billy that he would hit two home runs at the World Series for the kid after Babe Ruth promised just one. This two-story is repeated in the 1992 film The Babe.

While he was recovering from his illness, Sylvester also received an autographed football from Red Grange and an autographed tennis racket from Bill Tilden.

== Later life ==
In 1937, Sylvester graduated from Princeton University. He served in the United States Navy during World War II, where he reached the rank of lieutenant. He was the president of the Long Island City, Queens-based company Amscomatic Inc., which manufactured packaging machinery.

A resident of Garden City, New York, Sylvester died at age 74 at Winthrop-University Hospital in Mineola, New York on January 8, 1990.

The documentary film I'll Knock a Homer for You: The Timeless Story of Johnny Sylvester and Babe Ruth, made by Johnny’s nephew, Andrew Lilley, explores the story of Johnny and Babe in further detail, and was recognized in 2013 by the Garden State Film Festival.
