= Behind the Mike =

NBC radio series

- Genre: Talk
- Running time: 30 minutes
- Country of origin: United States
- Language: English
- Home station: Blue Network
- Hosted by: Graham McNamee
- Original release: September 15, 1940 – April 19, 1942
- No. of episodes: 79

Behind the Mike was a Blue Network (NBC) radio series hosted by Graham McNamee, spotlighting behind-the-scenes stories in radio broadcasting. The sustaining show aired Sundays at 4:30 p.m. ET from September 15, 1940, to April 19, 1942.

The program featured interviews with on-air personalities and announcers, musicians and other performers, composers, the creators of sound-effects, producers, engineers and other technicians involved in radio production. As many as six stories were covered in each broadcast, and questions from listeners were answered in the "Correspondence Corner" segment. Music was provided by Ernie Watson and his orchestra.

After McNamee's death May 9, 1942, the name of the series changed to This is the Truth, then Nothing But the Truth and continued until June 7, 1942.

Another program with the title Behind the Mike ran on CBS Radio during the 1931–32 season.
