= Charles E. Ford =

American film director

- Born: March 26, 1899; Martinsville, Indiana
- Died: August 7, 1942 (aged 43); Los Angeles, California
- Occupations: Newsreel and film producer; Motion picture director
- Years active: 1919–1942
- Spouse(s): Margaret Sheets (married 1920); Helen Ford (1929–1942, his death)

Charles E. Ford (March 26, 1899 – August 7, 1942) was a newsreel and film producer and the director of Frank Buck's jungle movie Jacaré (1942).

== Early life ==
Ford was the son of Charles A. Ford, an insurance salesman, and Martha A. Ford. Young Charles served as an Army cameraman in World War I and later worked for Fox, Pathé and International Newsreels as a cameraman.

== Career ==
=== Universal Newsreel ===
In 1929 Ford became managing director of Universal Newsreel and shortly thereafter spent thirty months touring Europe by automobile and plane. Among his newsreels were the series Going Places With Lowell Thomas (1934–1937), Stranger than Fiction (1934–1941) and another news series Going Places With Graham McNamee (1939–1940) featuring radio broadcaster Graham McNamee as reporter.

Ford's short subject Camera Thrills was nominated for an Academy Award in 1935.

One of Ford's best known Universal Newsreels was made in 1937 from 7,000 feet of film flown to New York from war-torn China, said to be the first motion picture of the warfare in Shanghai. It showed two major Japanese bombings of the city's streets, in Nanking Road and near the Cathay Hotel.

=== Republic Pictures ===
Ford was associate producer of the Roy Rogers films Billy the Kid Returns (1938), Shine On, Harvest Moon (1938), and Come on Rangers (1938). He was associate producer of the Gene Autry movies Man from Music Mountain (1938) and Gold Mine in the Sky (1938).

=== Jacaré ===
In 1942 Ford directed and Jules Levey produced Jacaré, Killer of the Amazon. This filmed record of James Dannaldson's hunting expedition into the Amazon jungles is filled with wild-animal footage, including a terrifying attack by a 28-foot anaconda. Levey incorporated a narration by Frank Buck and music by Miklos Rozsa.

== Death ==
Ford died suddenly of peritonitis after surgery in Cedars of Lebanon Hospital, just after returning from the Amazon. He left behind his wife, Helen Ford, and two children from his previous marriage to Margaret Sheets, along with his mother, two brothers, and a sister. He is buried in Forest Lawn, Glendale, Section Eventide, Map # 01, Lot # 1395, Space No. 3, (Ground). Dr. Irving Leroy Ress was one of his pallbearers.

== Bibliography ==
- Lehrer, Steven (2006). Bring 'Em Back Alive: The Best of Frank Buck. Texas Tech University Press. p. 248. ISBN 0-89672-582-0.
