= 970 Park Avenue =

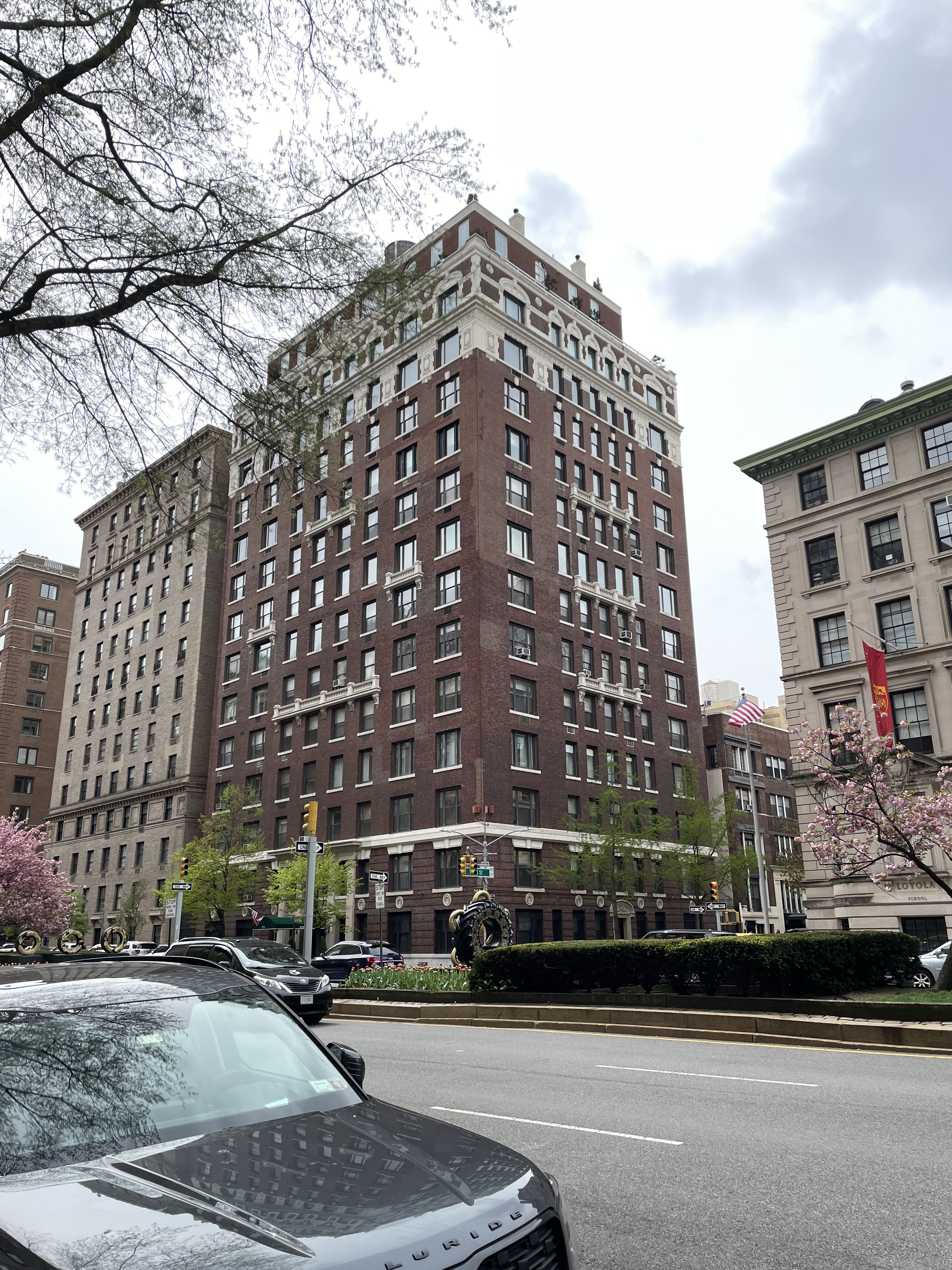
- 970 Park Avenue in 2024.
- Interactive map of the 970 Park Avenue area

General information
- Type: Housing cooperative
- Architectural style: Georgian Revival
- Location: Manhattan, New York, U.S.
- Coordinates: 40.7782°N 73.9591°W
- Construction started: 1911
- Completed: 1912

Height
- Height: 132.91 feet (40.51 m)

Technical details
- Material: Red Brick, Terra Cotta, Granite
- Floor count: 12

Design and construction
- Architecture firm: Schwartz & Gross
- Developer: Bing & Bing

970 Park Avenue is a luxury residential housing cooperative in Manhattan, New York City.

970 was designed by the New York architectural firm of Schwartz & Gross and built by the developers Bing & Bing. It is located on Park Avenue and East 83rd Street.

The 12-story building was erected in 1912. In 1940, the bank that owned the building reconfigured the building, altering the original spacious apartments into smaller units. In 1987, it was converted to a cooperative by Martin J. Raynes; Raynes added two triplex penthouses with "greenhouse" studies, circular staircases and large terraces. The building stands at 132 feet (40 m) tall.
