= Clyde E. Elliott =

American film director

- Clyde E. Elliott
- Born: July 23, 1885; Ord, Nebraska
- Died: June 12, 1959 (age 73); Los Angeles, California
- Occupations: motion picture director, producer, and writer
- Years active: 1919-1947
- Spouse: Marie Elliott

Clyde Ernest Elliott (July 23, 1885 – June 12, 1959) was an American motion picture director, producer, and writer. He is best known for animal films, especially Frank Buck’s first movie, Bring 'Em Back Alive (1932).

== Education and early career ==
Elliott was born in Ord, Nebraska, and was a class of 1909 alumnus of the University of Nebraska, and was a newspaper reporter, advertising solicitor and advertising promotion manager before entering the motion picture Industry. He founded Post Pictures Corporation in 1919, to make nature films distributed by Paramount.

== Films ==
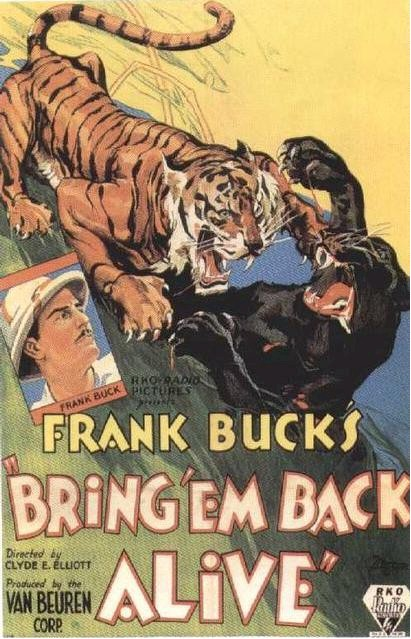
Poster for Bring 'Em Back Alive (1932)

Bring 'Em Back Alive (1932) was Elliott and Frank Buck's most successful and popular film. Unlike most other jungle pictures of the time, Elliott kept the camera in the background. Neither the camera nor the cameramen are visible in any of the scenes. The result is a clearer conception of the clashes between tigers, pythons, and crocodiles than had been achieved in previous films.

In The Devil Tiger (1934), Elliott allowed his star, Kane Richmond, to fight a 25-foot python. Richmond hated snakes but hated doubles more, and had insisted. The actor, on his feet, on the ground, on his feet again, succeeded in holding the snake's snapping mouth away from his face, while struggling to free himself from the triple coils around his body. At the height of the struggle, the heroine, Marion Burns, runs in and saves the hero from the python. Ms Burns had to fight the snake too, in order to get at Richmond's pistol, with which she was supposed to dispatch the python. She played her own scene, as well.

In 1935, Elliott was scheduled to visit Mongolia for Columbia Pictures to produce a film called China Roars. He was to be accompanied by one author (Gordon Rigby), two camera men (Carl Berger and Robert Miller), one assistant director, a business manager, a sound man (Zultan Kagel) and one American actor, whom Elliott hoped would be "a cross between Clark Gable and Ronald Colman." The story concerned an American physician and his Chinese aviator friend who decided to fly over the route to India once followed by Marco Polo. They are forced down in the Gobi Desert, taken prisoner by a nomad tribe, finally escape and, after a series of adventures which include a fight with river pirates, return to Shanghai. This movie was never made.

In Booloo (1938) Elliott produced and directed the story of Captain Robert Rogers (Colin Tapley), who organizes a search for a white tiger in the Malayan jungle to clear his father's name.

Elliott was a director (uncredited) of the Frank Buck film Jacaré. To Elliott's great relief, Jacaré was not "doctored" with scenes made at the studio of white girls lost in the jungle, a process, he claimed, by which Paramount had ruined Booloo.

Elliott's last film, Little Trunk (1947), was to have been set partly in Singapore. It was to show the reunion of a planter and his wife a few months after the end of World War II. It then was to quickly move 300 miles north to their rubber estate, on and near which the main action was to unfold. The plot revolved around incidents in the struggle of the couple to restore their war-wrecked plantation to productivity in the face of discouraging odds created by intriguing natives, wild animals and nature's angry moods. This film was never completed.

From 1945–1950, Elliott was editor of the Santa Ana Independent, a weekly newspaper published from 1935–1966. He died, aged 73, in Los Angeles, California.

== Filmography ==
- The Lone Indian (1921)
- Trees, a Noble Folk (1921)
- My Barefoot Boy (1921)
- A Bit Old Fashioned (1921)
- Le voyageur (1921)
- The City (1921)
- A Winter's Tale (1922)
- Western Ways (1922)
- Bring 'Em Back Alive (1932)
- The Devil Tiger (1934)
- Booloo (1938)
- Jacare (uncredited, 1942)
- Citizen Saint (1947)

== Bibliography ==
- Lehrer, Steven (2006). Bring 'Em Back Alive: The Best of Frank Buck. Texas Tech University press. p. 248. ISBN 0-89672-582-0.
