= James Dannaldson =

American actor

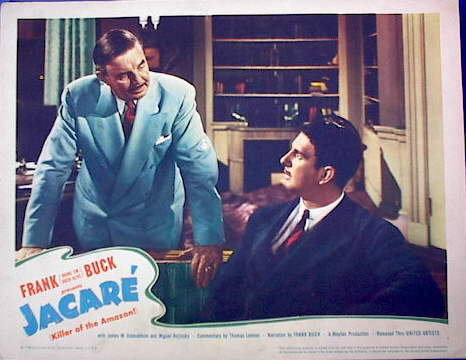
- Frank Buck (left) and James Dannaldson in Jacaré (1942)
- Born: July 17, 1915; Omaha, Nebraska
- Died: August 12, 1984 (age 69); Tarzana, California
- Occupation: motion picture actor
- Years active: 1942–1982
- Spouse: Beth Marie Dannaldson

James Melven Dannaldson (born July 17, 1915, Omaha, Nebraska, died August 12, 1984, Tarzana, California (age 69)) starred in the Frank Buck film Jacaré.

== Early life ==
Dannaldson was the son of James Jerrmiel Dannaldson and Lulu Belgium Rola Hiatt. Young James was a shot put star at Hollywood High School in 1934, when he suffered his first animal mishap. A pet rattlesnake nipped Dannaldson's finger when he playfully stuck his thumb into the reptile's mouth. Dannaldson was not deterred, and kept a barn filled with three rattlesnakes, five king snakes, ten turtles and one hoot owl when he was a University of Southern California student. The neighbors were not pleased.

== Jacaré ==
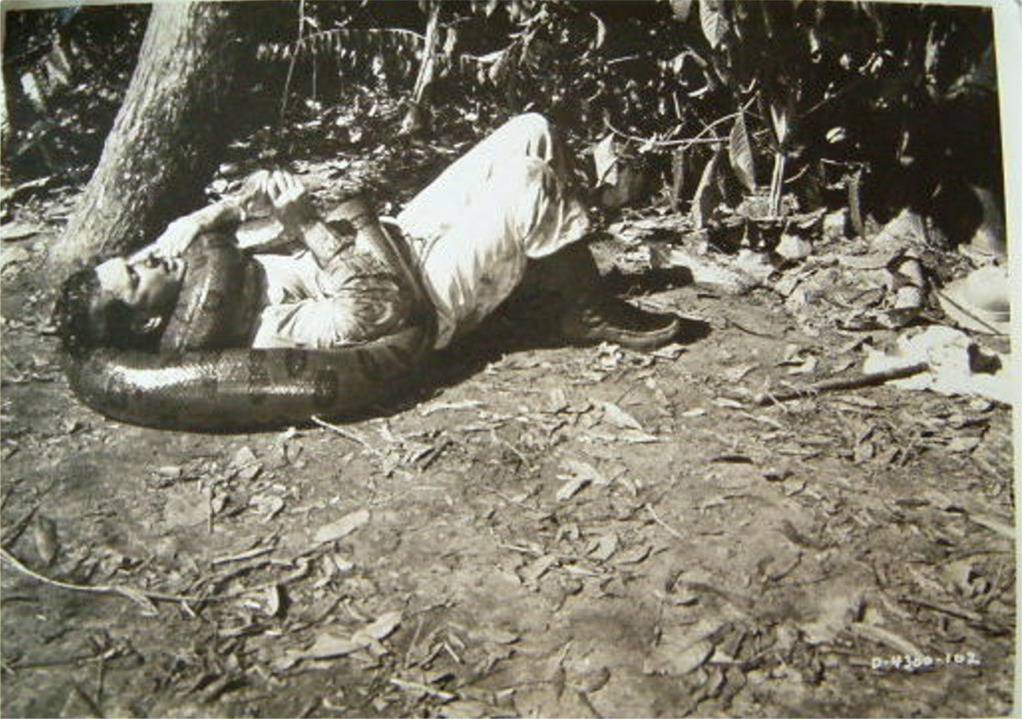
James Dannaldson in Jacaré (1942)

In Jacaré (1942) Dannaldson traveled up the Amazon to catch specimens. In the film, Dannaldson worked with jaguars and caymans, whose jaws had been wired shut. He said his only close call came when an anaconda he wrestled got a loop around his neck and almost strangled him before the natives could unwrap it. Dannaldson's most primitive adventure occurred on Marajó Island, at the mouth of the Amazon, where the movie company spent four weeks, ran out of imported food and had to subsist for five days on moldy doughnuts filled with small worms and on chickens which, Dannaldson said, seemed to be 90 per cent vulture. Producer Jules Levey incorporated a narration by Frank Buck and music by Miklos Rozsa into the finished film. Dannaldson came home from the Amazon with a rare eagle from Manaus, obtained as a fledgling from a native hunter. Dannaldson presented the eagle to the San Diego Zoo in 1943.

== Later life ==
In his later years, "Jungle Jim" Dannaldson provided animals for Hollywood films, especially reptiles, spiders, scorpions and insects for horror films. In 1977 he was to appear on The Tonight Show with a six-foot angleworm from Australia. Dannaldson was author of two books, Serpent Trails (1937) and A Trek in the Amazon Jungles (1949).

== Filmography ==
Cannery Row (1982) (zoological specialist)
... a.k.a. John Steinbeck's Cannery Row
Jennifer (1978) (zoological specialist)
... a.k.a. Jennifer Power (Philippines: English title)
... a.k.a. Jennifer the Snake Goddess
Damnation Alley (1977) (zoological specialist)
... a.k.a. Survival Run
Sisters of Death (1977) (animal trainer)
The Hills Have Eyes (1977) (snakes)
... a.k.a. Wes Craven's The Hills Have Eyes (USA: LD title)
Snakes (1974) (snake handler)
... a.k.a. Fangs
... a.k.a. Holy Wednesday
The Wild Bunch (1969) (provided ants, scorpions, and vultures)
Earth vs. the Spider (1958) (spider handler)
... a.k.a. Earth vs. the Giant Spider
... a.k.a. The Spider (USA: promotional title)
The Land Unknown (1957) (lizard handler)
The Cyclops (1957) (animal sequences)
The Hellstrom Chronicle (1971) (special thanks)
Jacaré (1942) (as James M. Dannaldson) .... Adventurer
... a.k.a. Jacare, Killer of the Amazon
