= Day's journey =

Nonstandard measurement of distance

A day's journey in pre-modern literature, including the Bible and ancient geographers and ethnographers such as Herodotus, is a measurement of distance.

In the Bible, it is not as precisely defined as other Biblical measurements of distance; the distance has been estimated from 32 to 40 kilometers (20 to 25 miles). Judges 19 records a party of three people and two mules who traveled from Bethlehem to Gibeah, a distance of about 10 mi (16 km), in an afternoon. Porter notes that a mule can travel about 3 mph (4.8 km/h), covering 24 mi (39 km) in an eight-hour day.

Another citation comes from Priscus (fr. 8 in Müller's Fragmenta Historicorum Graecorum) and is translated thus by J. B. Bury: We set out with the barbarians, and arrived at Sardica, which is thirteen days for a fast traveller from Constantinople. The distance from Constantinople (Istanbul) to Sofia is 550–720 km (340–450 mi); the passage therefore implies a pace between 42 and 55 km (26 and 34 mi) per day.

Based on a comprehensive review of references in Herodotus, Geus concludes that "Herodotus has a very well-defined notion of what distance a traveller can cover under normal circumstances in a day (between 150 and 200 stades or roughly, between 27 and 40 km (17 and 25 mi))," though he cites some exceptional examples of over 100 km (62 mi) per day.
