= Oriole Park at Camden Yards =

Baseball (MLB) stadium in Baltimore, Maryland, U.S.

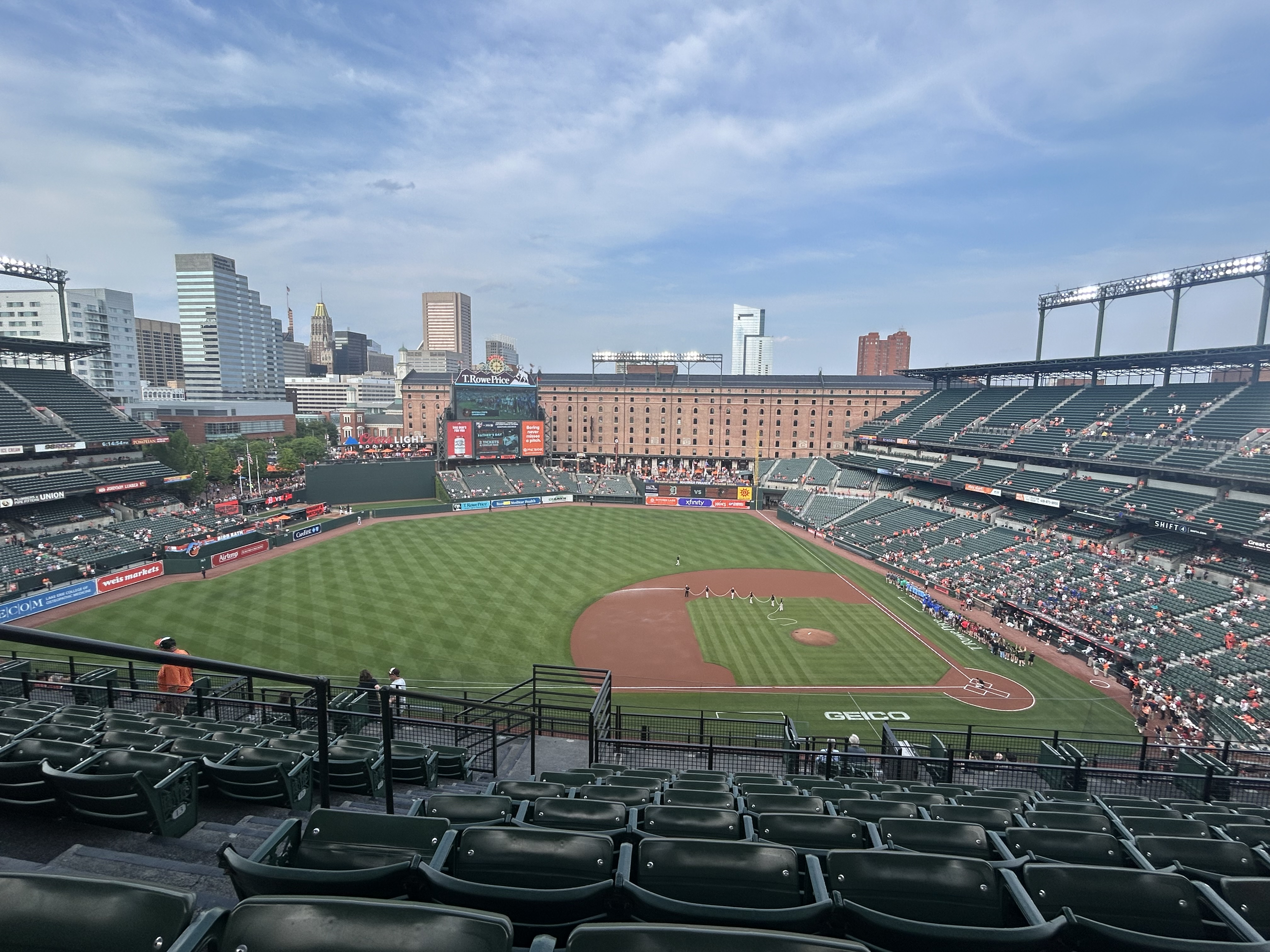
- The stadium at sunset in June 2025

- Location in Baltimore Location in Maryland Location in the United States
- Address: 333 W. Camden Street, 21230
- Location: Baltimore, Maryland, U.S.
- Coordinates: 39°17′2″N 76°37′18″W
- Operator: Maryland Stadium Authority
- Capacity: 48,876 (1992–2010); 45,971 (2011–2021) with standing room at least 48,187; 44,487 (2022–2025); 42,455 (2026–present)
- Surface: Kentucky Blue Grass
- Record attendance: 49,828 (July 9, 2005)
- Field size: Left Field Line – 333 ft (101 m); Straight Away Left – 373 ft (117 m); Left Center – 376 ft (121 m); Deep Left Center – 410 ft (125 m); Center Field – 400 ft (122 m) (Not posted); Right Center – 373 ft (114 m); Right Field Line – 318 ft (97 m)
- Public transit: MARC at Camden Station; Light RailLink at Convention Center and Camden Station; Metro SubwayLink at Lexington Market and Charles Center; MTA Maryland bus: 69, 70, 73, 75

Construction
- Groundbreaking: June 28, 1989
- Opened: April 6, 1992
- Cost: US$110 million ($252 million in 2025 dollars)
- Architect: HOK Sport (now Populous)
- Project manager: Lehrer McGovern and Bovis
- Structural engineers: Bliss & Nyitray, Inc
- Services engineer: Kidde Consultants Inc.
- General contractor: Barton Malow/Sverdrup/Danobe

Tenant
- Baltimore Orioles (MLB) (1992–present)

Website
- mlb.com/orioles/ballpark

Aerial views of Oriole Park at Camden Yards

Oriole Park at Camden Yards, commonly known as Camden Yards, is a ballpark in Baltimore, Maryland, United States. It is the home of Major League Baseball's (MLB) Baltimore Orioles, and the first of the "retro" major league ballparks constructed during the 1990s and early 2000s. It was completed in 1992 to replace Memorial Stadium. The stadium is in downtown Baltimore, a few blocks west of the Inner Harbor in the Camden Yards Sports Complex.

Since its opening, Oriole Park has been widely hailed as one of the best stadiums in baseball and is credited with starting a wave of neotraditional ballparks after the cookie-cutter stadiums of the mid to late 20th century.

Since construction on Oriole Park began in 1989, taxpayers have shouldered at least $1.3 billion of the stadium's costs. In 2023, the Orioles asked taxpayers to pay an additional $600 million for stadium renovations.

== History ==
=== Planning and construction ===
Prior to Camden Yards, the predominant design trend of big league ballparks was the symmetrical multi-purpose stadium. Memorial Stadium, the Orioles' home since they moved from St. Louis in 1954, was an early example of such a design.

In 1984, the Baltimore Colts moved to Indianapolis, in part because Baltimore and Maryland officials refused to commit money for a replacement for Memorial Stadium. Not wanting to risk losing the Orioles and Baltimore's status as a Major League Baseball city, city and state leaders immediately began planning a new park in order to keep them in town.

The master plan was designed by international design firm RTKL. The stadium design was completed by the architectural firm HOK Sport, which had pioneered retro ballparks at the minor league level four years earlier with Pilot Field in Buffalo, New York.

HOK Sport's original design was very similar to the new Comiskey Park. However, Orioles president and CEO Larry Lucchino turned it down preferring an old fashion ballpark with modern amenities. Lucchino hired Janet Marie Smith, an architect and city planner, to represent the team as Orioles senior vice president to execute his vision. Baltimore-based Ashton Design developed the signs, graphics, and logos for the stadium, as well as the 19th-century style clock above the scoreboard. Ashton's vintage designs, which echo the team's turn-of-the-century origins, proved influential, and the firm was called upon to complete similar retro redesigns of Fenway Park and Dodger Stadium.

Construction began in 1989 and lasted 33 months. Former Orioles owner Eli Jacobs favored naming the new field Oriole Park, while then-Maryland governor William Donald Schaefer favored Camden Yards. After considerable debate, a compromise was reached, and it was decided that both names were to be used, resulting in the stadium's long name.

=== 1992–2008: Grand opening and early years ===
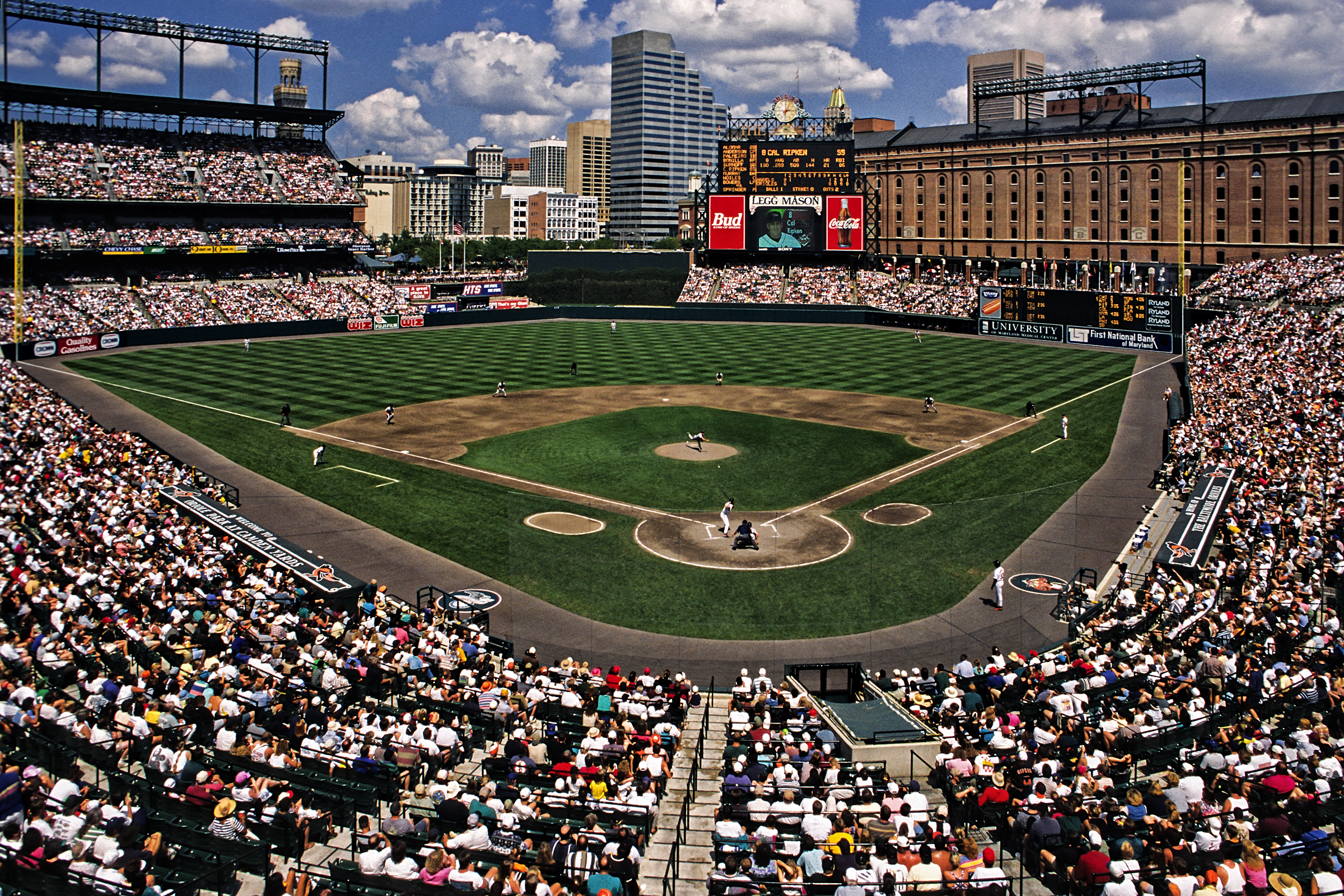
The stadium in September 1996

The first contest at Oriole Park at Camden Yards was a 5–3 preseason exhibition Orioles win over the New York Mets before 31,286 on April 3, 1992. The ballpark officially opened three days later on April 6 with Rick Sutcliffe pitching a complete game shutout in a season-opening 2–0 victory over the Cleveland Indians before a sellout crowd of 44,568. Chris Hoiles drove in the first run at Camden Yards with a ground-rule double that scored Sam Horn in the fifth inning.

Camden Yards hosted the 1993 MLB All-Star Game.

On June 18, 1994, an escalator accident injured 43 people when one of the stadium's multiple-story escalators, overcrowded with fans heading to the upper deck, jerked backward, throwing passengers to the bottom landing. On September 6, 1995, Camden Yards witnessed Cal Ripken Jr.'s record-setting 2,131st consecutive game. Exactly one year later, Eddie Murray hit his 500th home run there.

One orange seat stands out from the park's dark green plastic chairs. Located at Section 96, Row 7, Seat 23 in the right-center field bleachers (officially known as the Eutaw Street Reserve sections), the seat commemorates the spot where Murray's 500th home run landed. A second orange seat, Section 86, Row FF, Seat 10 in the left field bleachers, was removed as part of renovations moving the outfield wall. That seat was the landing spot for Ripken's 278th home run as a shortstop, breaking Ernie Banks' record for the position. That home run was hit on July 15, 1993. Ripken finished his career with 345 home runs as a shortstop and 431 overall.

The success of Camden Yards sparked a trend in the construction of more traditional, fan-friendly ballparks in downtown locations across the U.S.

=== Renovations ===
After the 2008 season, a new HD video display and scoreboard were installed below the right field flag court, a standing-room area between the warehouse and the right field wall. A new, high fidelity sound reinforcement system was added around the ballpark in 2009. The Orioles made numerous improvements to their home ballpark and to their spring training facility, Ed Smith Stadium, before the start of the 2011 season. All seats in the lower seating bowl were replaced and drink rails were added in the club level. Several skyboxes were also eliminated and refurbished to make room for more casual party suites, including the Miller Light Flight Deck. The renovation reduced Oriole Park's capacity from 48,876 to 45,971, making it more comparable with newer ballparks.

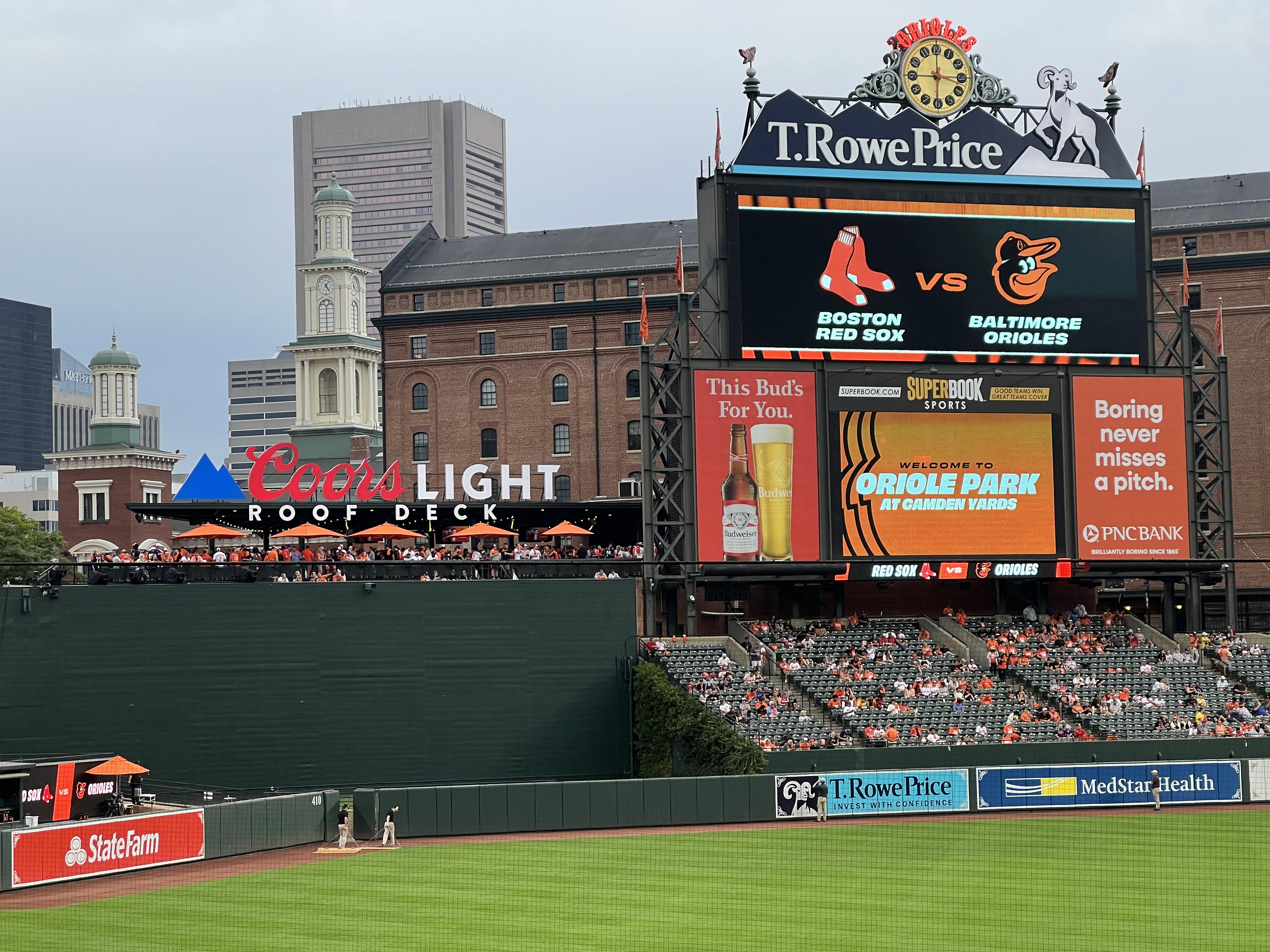
Coors Light Roof Deck and T. Rowe Price signs added in 2024

During the 2011–12 off-season, the Orioles announced further upgrades to Camden Yards in preparation for the 20th anniversary of the park's opening. These improvements included the expansion of concession food choices, widening of the concourses in the upper deck, the installation of a replica of the B&O Railway Warehouse's original canopy, and the addition of a lounge atop the batter's eye in center field, which had previously been inaccessible to fans. All fans are permitted to access the standing area of the lounge and fans can purchase tickets for drink rail seats. The Orioles also opened Dempsey's Bar and Grill, named for beloved longtime Orioles catcher and TV broadcaster Rick Dempsey, on the ground level of the warehouse that is open before games and on non-game days. The team also erected cast-bronze statues of all the Oriole Baseball Hall of Famers in the picnic area beyond the bullpens in left-center field. Furthermore, the right field wall was lowered from 25 feet (7.6 m) to 21 feet (6.4 m) to improve the view of the field from Eutaw Street. In March 2024, The Orioles announced a multiyear partnership with Coors Light to rename the lounge on top of batter's eye/bullpen wall in center field. The lounge would be renamed, the "Coors Light Roof Deck." In July 2024, an LED T. Rowe Price Sign was added above the videoboard replacing where "The Sun" was formerly located.

==== Blocked skyline views ====
In 2007–08, construction started on two large buildings beyond the stadium's outfield walls—a 757-room Hilton Baltimore hotel north of the stadium occupying a two-city-block area and a high-rise apartment building, both completed in 2009. The new buildings blocked views of the city's skyline from most sections of the grandstand. The Baltimore Sun said on April 21, 2008, "There's just a glimpse of the Bromo Seltzer Tower's crenellated top just to the right of the new Hilton Baltimore Convention Center hotel ... something's drastically different at Oriole Park this year ... the sweeping view of downtown Baltimore that fans have enjoyed for the past 16 seasons has changed considerably." Sportswriter Peter Schmuck complained, "the big, antiseptic convention hotel ... looms over Camden Yards ... [and] has blocked out the best part of the Baltimore skyline." A Washington Post columnist called it a "cruel cubist joke on a previously perfect ballpark," although others said they were pleased with new construction downtown as indicative of urban revitalization. Some hotel rooms have a clear view of the playing field.

==== Changes in field dimensions ====
In January 2022, Orioles general manager Mike Elias announced adjustments to Camden Yards' left field dimensions in an attempt to reduce the stadium's propensity for home runs. The changes, the first to the size of the iconic ballpark's playing area in two decades, raised the wall's height from 7 feet (2.1 m) to about 13 feet (4.0 m) and moved it back as much as 26 1/2 feet (8.1 m), according to the Orioles. The 2022 configuration removed about 1,100 seats in the first 10 rows of outfield bleacher seats in sections 72–86. MLB approved the adjustments, which span from the left-field corner to the bullpens in left-center field.

As of 2020, Camden Yards' 333-foot (101 m) distance from home plate to the left-field corner was about average for the 30 major league stadiums, though its 364-foot (111 m) distance to left-center was the sixth-shortest in the league. In addition, Oriole Park was one of only eight ballparks with a wall shorter than 8 feet in left and had the shortest wall in left-center field of any venue. That left-field wall was tied for the sixth-tallest in the majors. The 2022–2024 dimensions to straight away left (384 feet (117 m)) and left-center (398 feet (121 m)) made Oriole Park's left field the most spacious in the American League. However, the protrusion created by the bullpens resulted in an unusual sight on a modern baseball field: a reduction in dimensions as one moved from left field toward center field. The left-center field dimension marked to the immediate left of the bullpens was 398 feet, while the left-center field dimension marked on the bullpens' wall was 376 feet. This created a hypothetical scenario in which a batter could hit a longer non-home run to left field than home run to left-center field, if the latter is hit into the bullpens. In 2024, Elias announced further adjustments to the left field wall, extending it from the bullpen and bringing it in to 363 (111 m) feet from home. A small connecting wall then stretches out to 374 feet, where an eight-foot segment leads to a corner located 373 (114 m) feet from home.

The orange seat commemorating Cal Ripken Jr.'s record 278th home run by a major league shortstop would be moved to an exhibit for the ballpark's 30th anniversary.

==== B&O Warehouse ====
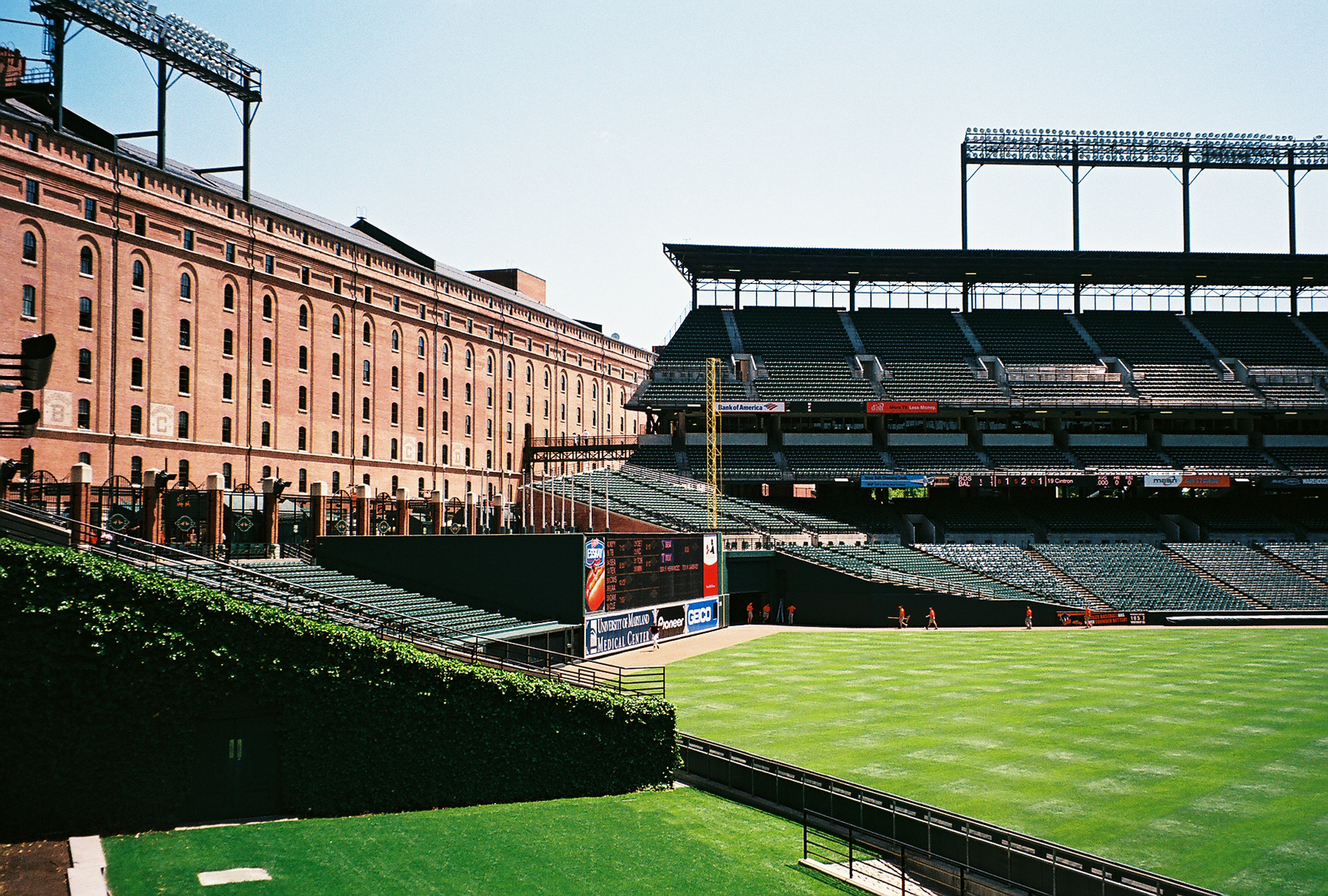
Right field and the former Baltimore & Ohio Warehouse at Camden Yards

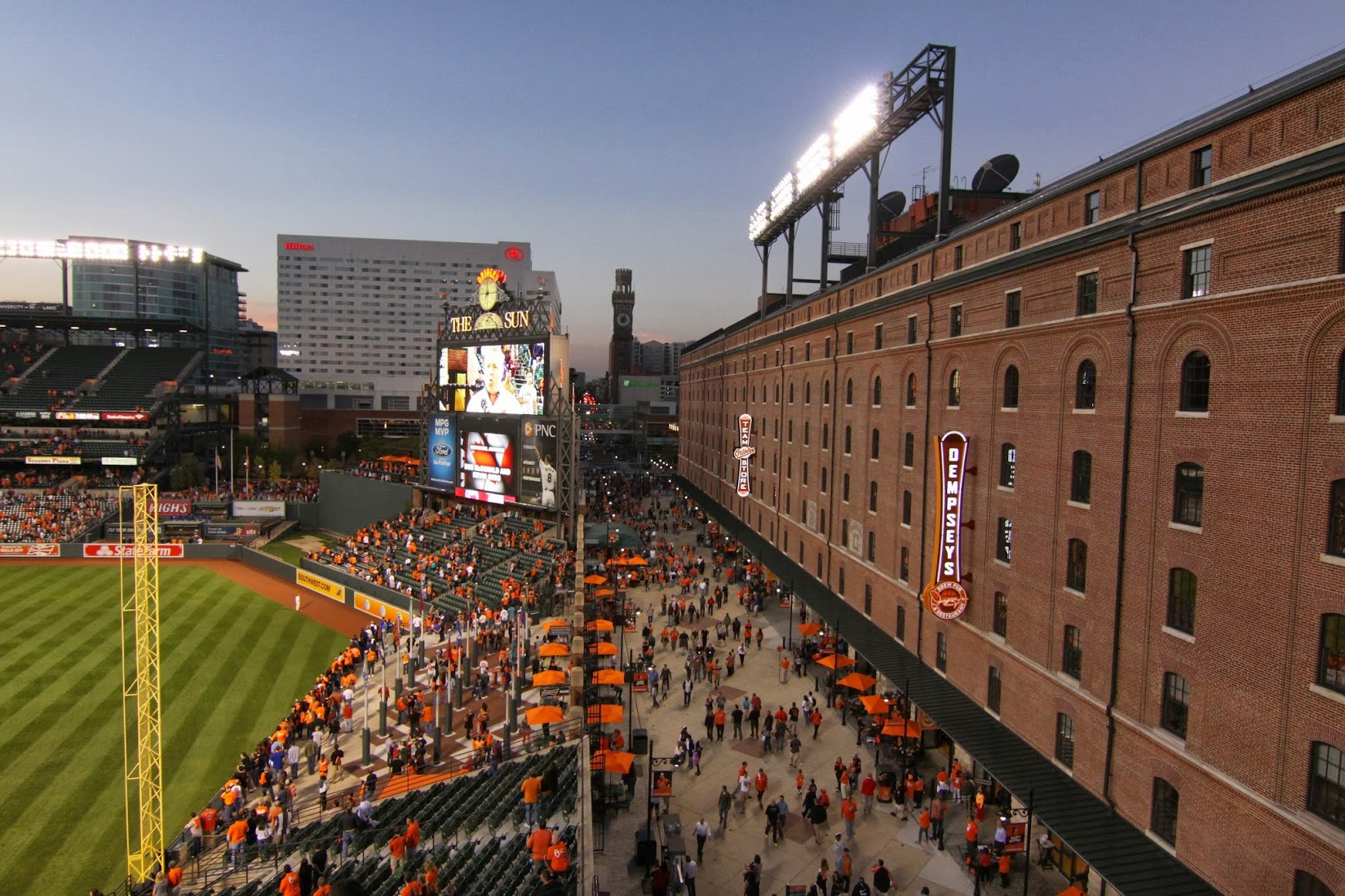
B&O Warehouse and Eutaw Street before a September 2013 game

The stadium planners incorporated the warehouse into the architecture of the ballpark experience rather than demolish or truncate it. The floors of the warehouse contain offices, service spaces, and a private club. The warehouse has never been hit by a legal home run during regulation play. However, several players have reportedly struck the wall during batting practice, and it was hit by Ken Griffey Jr. during the Home Run Derby before the 1993 MLB All-Star Game.

==== Eutaw Street ====
Eutaw Street, between the stadium and the warehouse, is closed to vehicular traffic. Along this street, spectators can get a view of the game or visit the many shops and restaurants that line the thoroughfare, including former Oriole star Boog Powell's outdoor barbecue stand. On game days, pedestrians must have a ticket in order to walk on the part of Eutaw Street adjacent to the stadium; however, on non-game days the street is open to all, while access to the stadium is gated. Sections 90–98, called Eutaw Street palace, are located not in the stadium, but adjacent to Eutaw Street, with the seats descending toward the outfield below. If a game sells out, fans may purchase reduced-price "standing-room only" tickets, which entitle them to enter Eutaw Street and watch the game from two designated standing areas (in the left field bullpen area or above the scoreboard in right field).

Many home run balls have landed on Eutaw Street, and the Orioles have marked the spots with small baseball-shaped bronze plaques embedded in the street, though it sometimes takes up to a year for each homer to get a plaque. As of 2024, 130 homers have landed on Eutaw Street. The first home run to reach Eutaw Street was hit by Mickey Tettleton of the Detroit Tigers on April 20, 1992. The longest in-game home run to land on Eutaw Street was Gunnar Henderson's 462-foot shot on June 11, 2023. However, the only player to ever hit the Baltimore & Ohio Warehouse at Camden Yards on the fly is Ken Griffey Jr of the Seattle Mariners, who accomplished the 465-foot hit as part of the 1993 Home Run Derby. There have been two games with two Eutaw street home runs: April 11, 1997, when Rafael Palmeiro hit both home runs and June 29, 2012. The single season record for home runs landing on Eutaw Street is 11, set in 2014. MLB.com publishes an updated list of Eutaw Street landings on the Orioles website.

=== Notable events ===
The Orioles celebrated the ballpark's 20th anniversary during the 2012 season and launched the website CamdenYards20.com as part of the celebration. Historically, Oriole Park at Camden Yards is one of several venues that have carried the "Oriole Park" name for various Baltimore franchises over the years.

==== Notable games ====
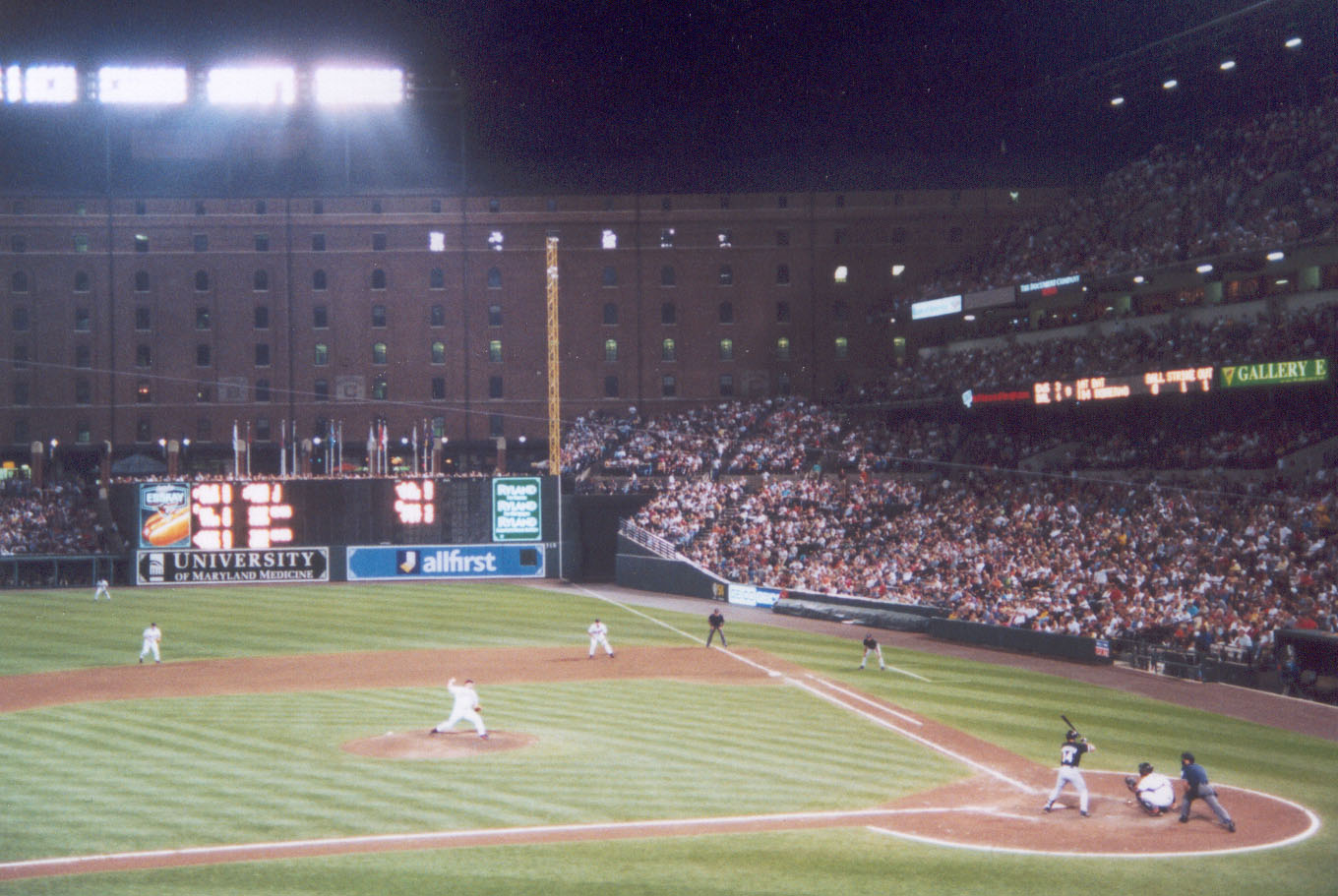
The Orioles hosting the Chicago White Sox in 1999

- September 6, 1995: Cal Ripken Jr. broke Lou Gehrig's record of 2,130 consecutive games played, and hit a home run during that game. Attendees included President Bill Clinton, Vice President Al Gore, Joe DiMaggio, and Cal Ripken Sr.
- May 17, 1996: Chris Hoiles hit a rare ultimate grand slam (walk off grand slam down by three runs), doing so in even more dramatic fashion with a full-count in the ninth inning to carry the Orioles to a 14–13 victory over Seattle. In advance of Oriole Park's 25th anniversary, MLB honored the game as the third most memorable in Oriole Park history.
- September 6, 1996: Eddie Murray hit his 500th career home run exactly one year after Cal Ripken Jr. broke Lou Gehrig's consecutive game streak.
- October 15, 1997: The Cleveland Indians win Game 6 of the 1997 ALCS 1–0 in 11 innings to win the series 4–2 and advance to the World Series. As of 2024, this is the closest the Orioles have been to hosting a World Series in Camden Yards, with the last one occurring 14 years before, when they were still playing at Memorial Stadium.
- May 3, 1999: The Cuban national team defeat the Orioles 12–6 in the second game of a two-game exhibition series
- April 4, 2001: Hideo Nomo pitched the first no-hitter in the history of Camden Yards, walking three and striking out eleven.
- October 4, 2001: Tim Raines Sr. played left field and Tim Raines Jr. played center field, in the 5–4 loss to the Boston Red Sox becoming only the second father-son duo to play in the same game. Ken Griffey Sr. and Ken Griffey Jr. were the only other father-son duo to do so (with the Mariners on August 31, 1990).
- October 6, 2001: Cal Ripken, Jr.'s final MLB game. Former President Bill Clinton and MLB Commissioner Bud Selig were in attendance.
- August 22, 2007: The Texas Rangers beat the Orioles 30–3 in game one of a doubleheader, the highest scoring game in 110 years.
- May 31, 2008: Manny Ramirez of the Red Sox hits his 500th home run in a game against the Orioles.
- June 30, 2009: The Orioles rallied to score 10 runs against the Red Sox after facing a 10–1 deficit in the 7th inning, breaking the franchise record for the largest comeback, and the MLB record for the largest comeback by a last place team over a first place team.
- September 28, 2011: The Orioles defeated the Boston Red Sox in the final day of the season with a 4–3 walk-off win. The loss, coupled with the Tampa Bay Rays' 8–7 victory over the New York Yankees at Tropicana Field minutes later, eliminated the Red Sox from postseason contention. The Red Sox became the first team in baseball history to miss the postseason after leading by as many as nine games for a playoff spot entering the month of September.
- May 8, 2012: Josh Hamilton tied the MLB record for home runs in a game with 4. He went 5 for 5 with four home runs and one double.
- October 3, 2014: The Orioles rallied with four runs in the 8th inning to top the Tigers 7–6 in Game 2 of the American League Division Series.
- April 29, 2015: As a result of the 2015 Baltimore riots, the game against the White Sox was closed to the public, the first time that has happened in MLB history.

==== Ballpark firsts ====
Ballpark First	Date	Details
First Game	April 6, 1992	vs. Cleveland Indians
Ceremonial First Pitch	April 6, 1992	President George H. W. Bush
First Pitch	April 6, 1992	Rick Sutcliffe, 3:20 p.m. EDT – pitch was a ball
First Batter	April 6, 1992	Kenny Lofton, Indians center fielder, flied out to right fielder Joe Orsulak on a 3–2 pitch
First Hit	April 6, 1992	Cleveland's first baseman Paul Sorrento, singled to left-center with one out in the top of the second inning
First Orioles Hit	April 6, 1992	Orioles first baseman Glenn Davis led off the bottom of the second inning with a single to center
First Run	April 6, 1992	In the fifth inning, O's designated hitter Sam Horn walked, went to second base on third baseman Leo Gómez's single and scored on catcher Chris Hoiles' double
First RBI	April 6, 1992	Chris Hoiles hit a ground rule double (ball bounced over the left-center fence) to score Sam Horn
First Double	April 6, 1992	Chris Hoiles hit a ground rule double (ball bounced over the left-center fence) to score Sam Horn
First Strikeout	April 6, 1992	Sutcliffe struck out Cleveland right fielder Mark Whiten in the second inning
First Home Run	April 8, 1992	Cleveland's Paul Sorrento (3-run homer)
First Orioles Home Run	April 9, 1992	Mike Devereaux, leading off the fourth inning against Cleveland's Jack Armstrong
First Stolen Base	April 9, 1992	Cleveland's Mark Lewis (against Ben McDonald and Chris Hoiles), third inning
First Grand Slam	April 17, 1992	Randy Milligan, seventh inning, off Detroit's Les Lancaster
First Multi-Home Run Game	April 17, 1992	Milligan off Detroit's Scott Aldred and Les Lancaster
First Triple	April 17, 1992	Cal Ripken, 6th inning, off Detroit's Scott Aldred
First Save	April 19, 1992	Gregg Olson, vs. Detroit, in a 3–2 victory
First No-Hitter	April 4, 2001	Boston's Hideo Nomo, in a 3–0 victory

== Design and features ==
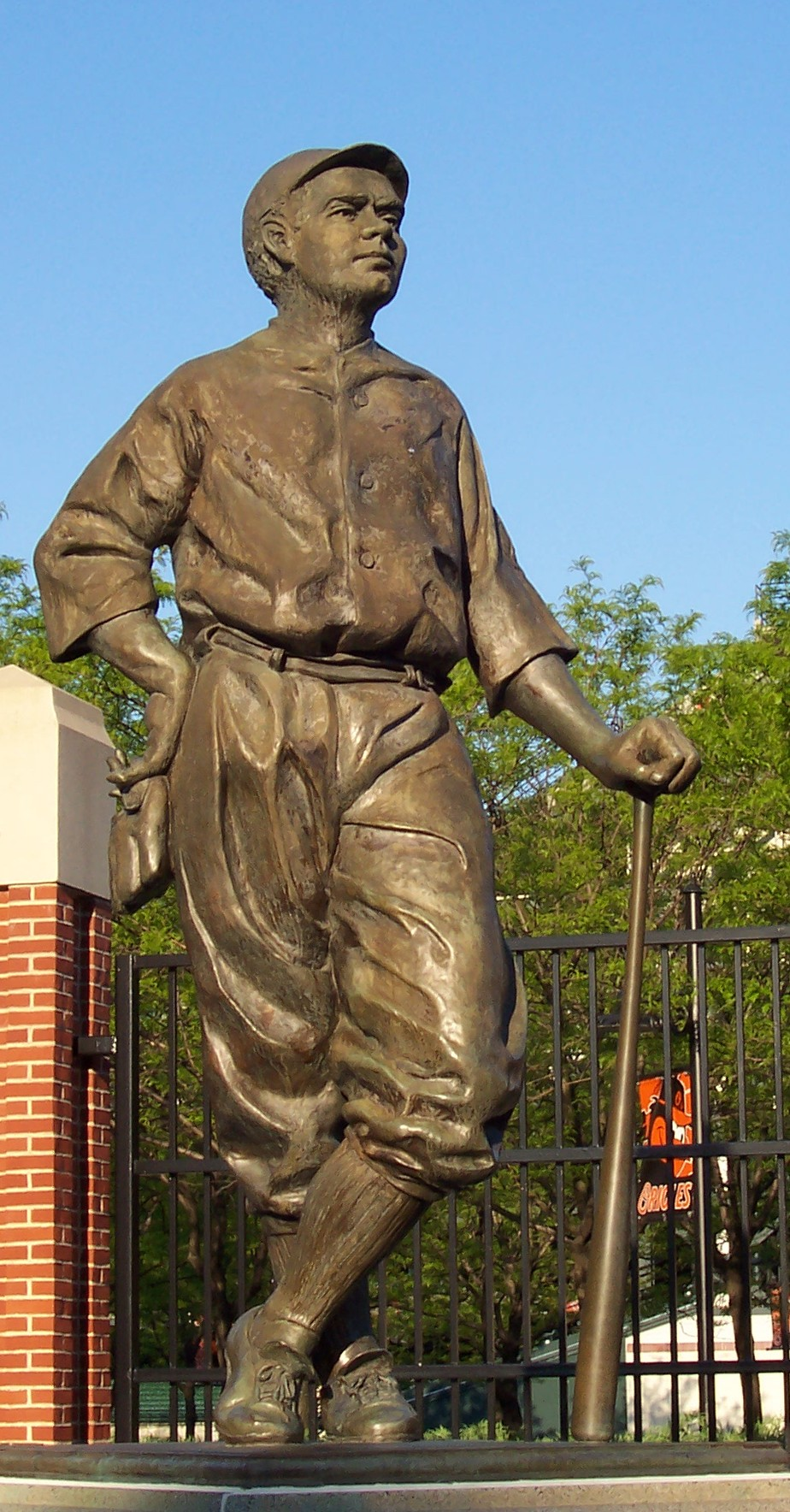
Susan Luery's 1996 statue of Babe Ruth, Babe's Dream

Camden Yards was built on land that once served as the rail yard for the Baltimore and Ohio Railroad's Camden Station. The view from much of the park is dominated by the former Baltimore & Ohio Warehouse at Camden Yards behind the right-field wall. Some seats in the stadium have a good view of the downtown Baltimore skyline.

The bullpen area was designed after many write-in designs were submitted by the public. Its unique two-tiered design was a first in major league parks.

A picnic area is located above and behind the bullpens. Rows of picnic tables covered by orange umbrellas are available for fans to sit and eat. Many trees are located there, too. Many fans at home games view the game from behind the railing behind the bullpens. Until the 2012 season, the Mid-Atlantic Sports Network's pre- and post-game shows before Orioles home games were televised in an outdoor studio behind the bullpens. Bronze sculptures of the six Orioles greats whose uniform numbers were retired by the ballclub were unveiled individually in the walking zone of the area behind the bullpens throughout the 2012 season. The statues were created by Antonio Tobias Mendez and cast at the locally based New Arts Foundry.

On the street there is a statue of Babe Ruth entitled, Babe's Dream, created in 1996 by sculptor Susan Luery. In the same courtyard, one will find sculptures indicating the retired jersey numbers of the Baltimore Orioles.

The stadium is the first major league park to have an outfield wall made up entirely of straight wall segments since Ebbets Field. The playing field is 16 feet (4.9 m) below street level.

The stadium contains 4,631 club seats and 72 luxury suites. Every seat in the ballpark is green, except for an orange seat in right field, which marks the spot of Eddie Murray's 500th career home run. A second orange seat, marking the spot of Cal Ripken's 278th career home run, was removed.

Camden Yards lights spell out "GO ORIOLES" all throughout the month of September.

=== Seating capacity ===
Years	Capacity
1992–1996	48,041
1997–2000	48,079
2001–2004	48,190
2005–2010	48,290
2011–2021	45,971
2022–2025	44,487
2026–present	42,455

=== Ballparks influenced by Camden Yards ===
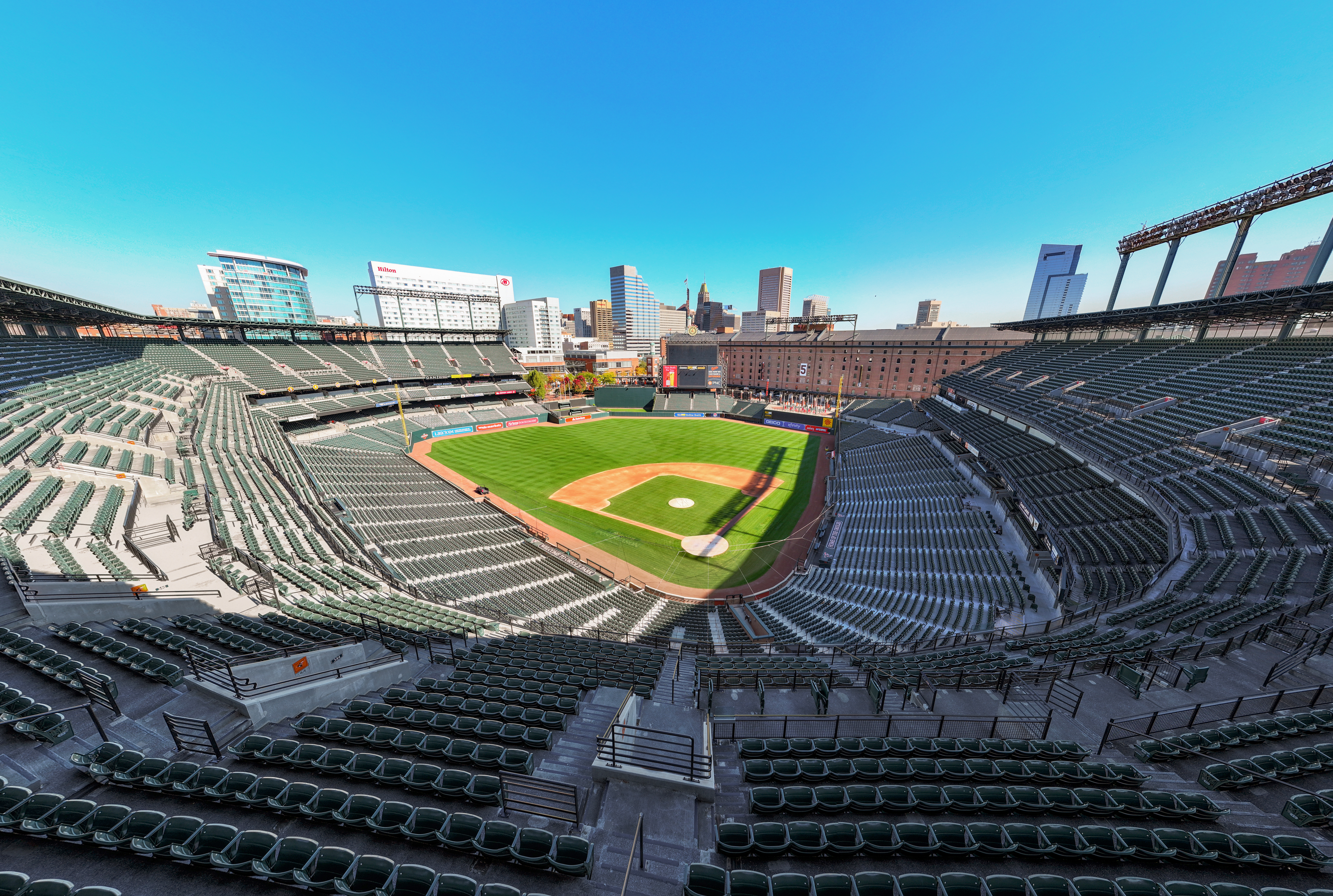
Baltimore skyline in the background

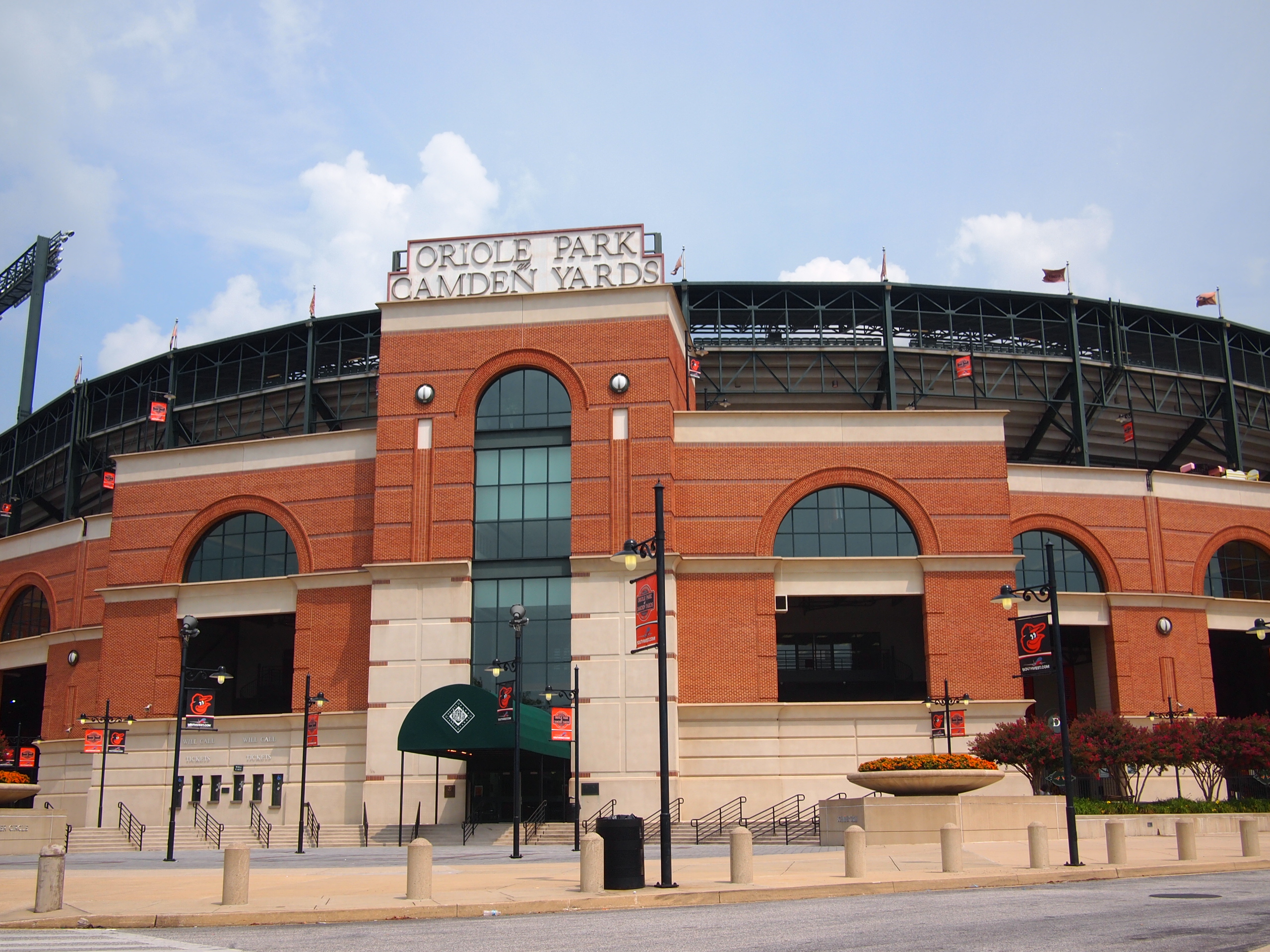
Main entrance from Russell Street

Since opening 1992, Camden Yards was a success and fan favorite. Attendance jumped from an average of 25,722 over the final 10 years of Memorial Stadium's tenure to an average of 43,490 over the first 10 years of Camden Yards' existence. Due to its success, many other cities built traditional-feeling asymmetrical ballparks with modern amenities, such as skyboxes, in a downtown setting. Many of these stadiums, like Camden Yards, incorporate "retro" features in the stadium exteriors and interiors. These parks have been dubbed "retro-classic" parks. Other parks, known as "retro-modern" parks, have combined "retro" exteriors with more modern interior elements.

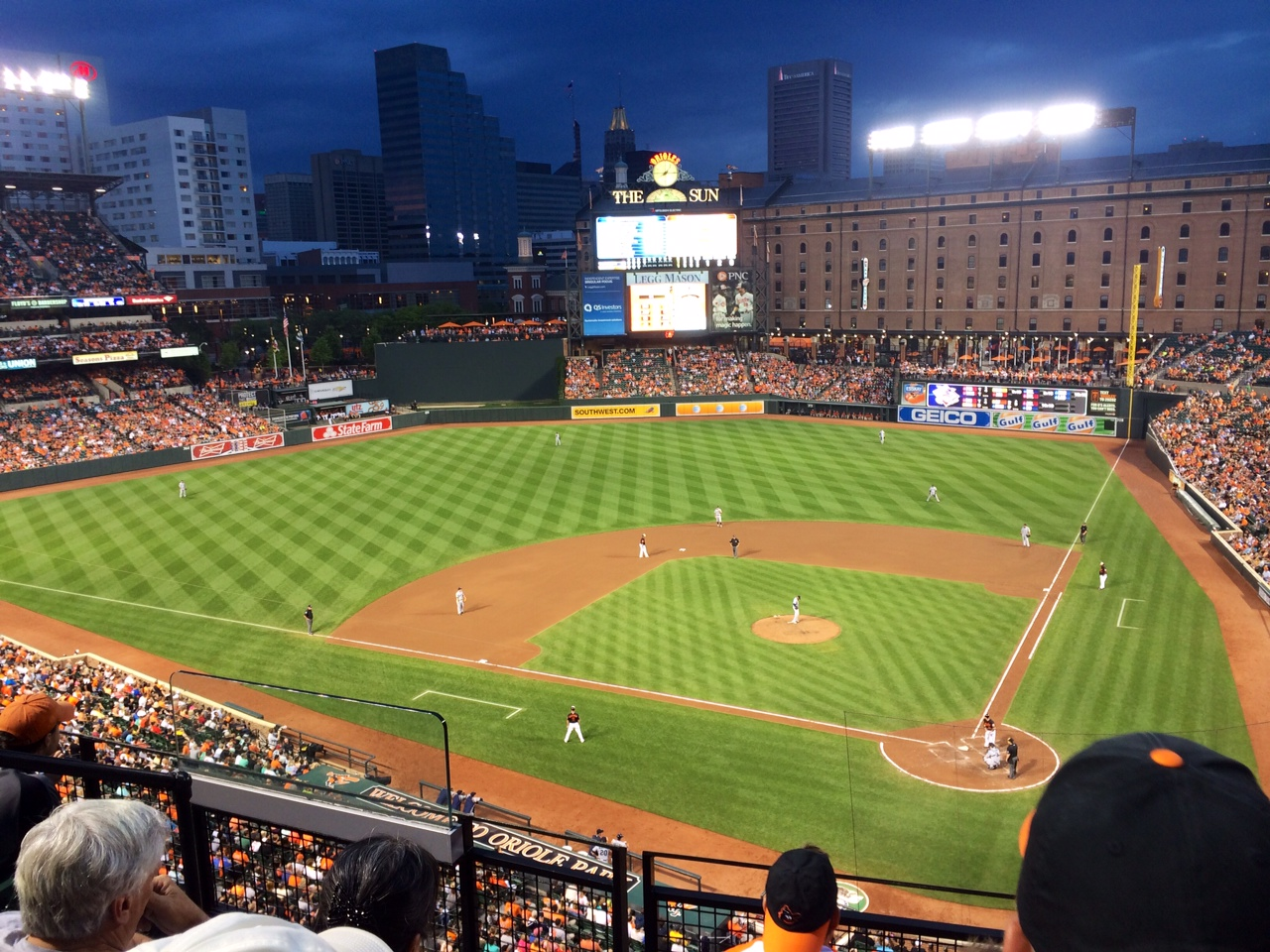
The Orioles hosting the Seattle Mariners on August 1, 2014

The park also ended a quarter-century trend of multi-purpose stadiums shared by baseball and football teams. Intended to cut costs, the fundamentally different sizes and shapes of baseball and football fields made this concept fundamentally inadequate for either sport. By the 2012 season, all but two teams played in baseball-only parks. With the Athletics move from Oakland after the 2024 season, no teams play in stadiums that have recently been home to top-level football teams.

Retro-classic parks include:

- Coors Field in Denver (1995)
- Oracle Park in San Francisco (2000)
- Comerica Park in Detroit (2000)
- PNC Park in Pittsburgh (2001)
- Citizens Bank Park in Philadelphia (2004)
- Busch Stadium in St. Louis (2006)
- Citi Field in Queens, New York City (2009)
- New Yankee Stadium in The Bronx, New York City (2009)
- Rate Field in Chicago (1991/2011)
  - This park opened in 1991 as the last of the so-called "modern" ballparks. It was heavily renovated from 2001 to 2011 into a retro-classic park.

Retro-modern parks include:

- Progressive Field in Cleveland (1994)
- Angel Stadium in Anaheim (1966/1998)
  - Angel Stadium opened in 1966 as a modern park. From 1979 to 1980, it was converted into a multi-purpose park shared with the NFL's Los Angeles Rams. After the Rams moved to St. Louis after the 1994 NFL season, the stadium was extensively renovated a second time from 1996 to 1998, with the most significant change being the removal of almost all of the seats added for football. The final result was a retro-modern park.
- Chase Field in Phoenix (1998)
- T-Mobile Park in Seattle (1999)
- Daikin Park in Houston (2000)
- American Family Field in Milwaukee (2001)
- Great American Ball Park in Cincinnati (2003)
- Petco Park in San Diego (2004)
- Nationals Park in Washington, D.C. (2008)
- Target Field in Minneapolis (2010)
- Truist Park in Cumberland, Georgia (2017)
- Globe Life Field in Arlington, Texas (2020)

LoanDepot Park in Miami (opened in 2012), was the first since Camden Yards not classified as a "retro" park, whether of the classic or modern variety. Marlins owner Jeffrey Loria specifically rejected the retro model for the new park, desiring a facility that reflected the 21st-century culture of Miami. Populous, which designed both Camden Yards and LoanDepot Park, later said it was "waiting for a client willing to break the [retro] mold." Stadium planners labeled LoanDepot Park the first example of contemporary architecture in MLB.

== Non-baseball events ==
For much of its history, Camden Yards rarely hosted events beyond baseball games because Orioles owner Peter Angelos objected to uses besides the sport. The policy was loosened in the late 2010s as Angelos ceded control of the team to his son John. Following Paul McCartney's concert at Camden Yards in 2022, baseball journalist Dan Connolly opined non-baseball events were a boon for the city and team, while Camden Yards is an "entertainment venue that's only used 81 or so times a year. If you can fill that space — without damaging the playing surface, of course — do it."

In October 2025, the Los Angeles Rams held a practice at Oriole Park before their next game in London. They played the local Baltimore Ravens the week prior and opted to stay in the area before going to Europe, using Camden Yards rather than M&T Bank Stadium since the latter's field was likely to be damaged from the Rams–Ravens game. The Rams covered the ballpark's operating costs.

=== Concerts ===
Date	Artist	Opening act(s)	Tour / Concert name	Attendance	Revenue	Notes
July 26, 2019	Billy Joel	—	Billy Joel in Concert	39,246 / 39,246	$6,013,337	This was the ballpark's first major concert.
June 12, 2022	Paul McCartney	—	Got Back Tour	40,733 / 40,733	$9,806,025	McCartney's first solo concert in Baltimore and his first time performing in the city since The Beatles came to town in 1964.
September 13, 2024	Bruce Springsteen and The E Street Band	—	Springsteen and E Street Band 2023–2025 Tour	—	—	

=== Papal Mass ===
On October 8, 1995, Pope John Paul II celebrated Mass at Camden Yards as part of his visit to Baltimore, one of the most prominent non-baseball events at Camden Yards.

== Awards and recognitions ==
On May 6, 1992, Oriole Park received the Urban Design Award Of Excellence from the American Institute Of Architects.

In March 2013, Oriole Park was named the third most popular American ballpark by TripAdvisor.

== Attendance ==
Between 1992–2000, the Orioles averaged more than 40,000 spectators per game, with a total attendance of 3.71 million persons in the 1997 season. Attendance gradually declined to 1.73 million in the 2010 season. Since then, attendance has improved as the team is more competitive, peaking at 2.46 million in 2014 and 2.28 million in 2024. The current single game highest attendance record at Camden Yards is 49,828, set on July 9, 2005, against the Boston Red Sox. On April 29, 2015, Camden Yards was practically empty after the riots in Baltimore over Freddie Gray. Only two scouts, one scoreboard display operator, the play-by-play commentators for the teams' radio and television networks, and the players showed up to watch, and official attendance was 0. This marked the first time in MLB history that the public was not permitted to attend a baseball game. Aside from that, a low-attendance mark was set on April 8, 2019, when just 6,585 fans watched the Orioles host the Oakland Athletics.

On August 19, 2008, the stadium hosted its 50 millionth fan, a milestone reached in just 17 seasons, the fastest park in baseball history to reach such a figure. From 1992 to 2008, Oriole Park has hosted the third-most number of fans in MLB, exceeded only by Dodger Stadium and Yankee Stadium.

Home Attendance at Oriole Park at Camden Yards
Year	Total attendance	Game average	AL rank
1992	3,567,819	44,047	2nd
1993	3,644,965	45,000	2nd
1994	2,535,359	46,097	2nd
1995	3,098,475	43,034	1st
1996	3,646,950	44,475	1st
1997	3,711,132	45,816	1st
1998	3,684,650	45,490	1st
1999	3,433,150	42,385	2nd
2000	3,297,031	40,704	2nd
2001	3,094,841	38,686	4th
2002	2,682,439	33,117	3rd
2003	2,454,523	30,303	5th
2004	2,744,018	33,877	5th
2005	2,624,740	32,404	5th
2006	2,153,139	26,582	10th
2007	2,164,822	26,726	11th
2008	1,950,075	24,376	10th
2009	1,907,163	23,545	9th
2010	1,733,019	21,395	10th
2011	1,755,461	21,672	11th
2012	2,102,240	25,954	7th
2013	2,357,561	29,106	8th
2014	2,464,473	30,426	6th
2015	2,281,202	29,246	8th
2016	2,172,344	26,819	10th
2017	2,028,424	25,042	12th
2018	1,564,192	19,311	14th
2019	1,307,807	16,146	14th
2020	—N/a	—N/a	—N/a
2021	793,229	9,793	13th
2022	1,368,367	16,893	11th
2023	1,936,798	23,911	9th
2024	2,281,129	28,162	8th
2025	1,803,655	22,267	10th
2026	1,829,252	22,583	11th

== Access and transportation ==
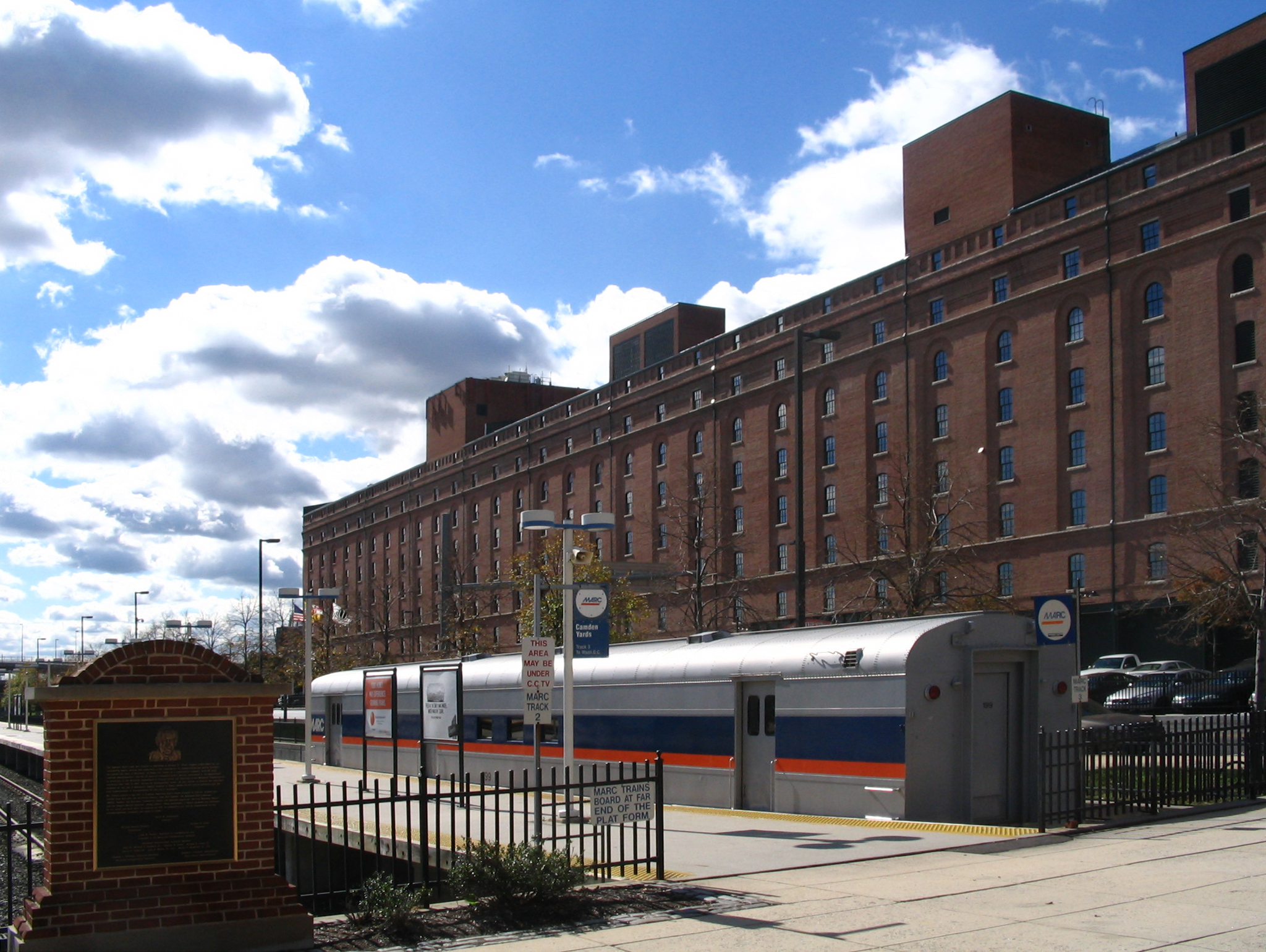
Camden Station adjacent to the ballpark

On the far side of the Baltimore & Ohio Warehouse at Camden Yards is the present Camden Station, served by both the Baltimore Light RailLink and MARC's Camden Line commuter rail service. The latter rail line provides direct service to Washington, D.C., and the former to BWI Airport. The Light RailLink service began around the time the stadium opened. Nearby Convention Center station also sees heavy traffic during Orioles games; the station is located near the stadium's main entrance.

The stadium is located in downtown Baltimore, near the Inner Harbor. The ballpark, along with the adjacent M&T Bank Stadium, home of the Baltimore Ravens of the National Football League, make up the Camden Yards Sports Complex, though Camden Yards generally refers to only the baseball stadium. The football stadium was built in 1998, the Ravens' third season in existence. Camden Yards is just a short walk from Babe Ruth's birthplace, which is now a museum. According to some sources, Ruth's father once owned a pub located in what is now center field of the stadium.

In May 2005, Sports Legends Museum at Camden Yards, opened in Camden Station. It lasted 10 years, closing on October 12, 2015.

== In popular culture ==
- The film Dave (1993) features a scene with the U.S. president, played by Kevin Kline, throwing out the first pitch at Camden Yards. That scene was filmed in front of an actual capacity crowd at the ballpark, prior to a regular-season game in early August 1992. Similar scenes were filmed for the Chris Rock movie Head of State, for the Geena Davis TV series Commander in Chief, and for the 2004 season finale of The West Wing.
- The film Major League II (1994) used Camden Yards as the home of the Indians.
- Part of the sixth-season premiere of the NBC police drama series Homicide: Life on the Street was filmed at Camden Yards. In these scenes, the detectives must hurry to solve a murder at Camden Yards before a game between the Orioles and the New York Yankees ends.
- A short clip in the 2005 film Wedding Crashers shows Oriole Park at Camden Yards.
- A portion of an episode of the HBO series The Wire, set in Baltimore, was filmed during an Orioles game in which characters Jimmy McNulty and Bunk Moreland, played by Dominic West and Wendell Pierce, take their sons to a game while discussing a case. The pilot of the HBO 2009 comedy series Eastbound & Down begins with an aerial shot of Camden Yards; however, when actor Danny McBride takes the mound, the field level shot is at a different ballpark.
- The HBO series Veep filmed episode 6 of its first season at Camden Yards. Orioles Hall of Fame pitcher Jim Palmer and then-Orioles players Jake Arrieta and Tommy Hunter made cameo appearances on the field with Veep star Julia Louis-Dreyfus. This was perhaps a subtle homage to Louis-Dreyfus's previous role as Towson-native Elaine Benes on Seinfeld and that character's Orioles fandom.
- House of Cards features the U.S. vice president, played by Kevin Spacey, throwing out a ceremonial first pitch at Camden Yards. Spacey, a noted Orioles fan who actually threw a real ceremonial first pitch against the Blue Jays in 2013, is first seen wearing a jacket featuring the cartoon bird in the tunnel to the team dugout as he is being introduced to the crowd. Former closer Jim Johnson and outfielder Nate McLouth meet Spacey's character on the field, with Johnson expecting to receive the pitch as the stadium lights suddenly go out. For added realism, the crowd even yells "O" during the national anthem.

== See also ==
- List of ballparks by capacity
- List of current Major League Baseball stadiums
- Lists of stadiums

Events and tenants
Preceded by Memorial Stadium	Home of the Baltimore Orioles; 1992 – present	Succeeded by Current
Preceded by Jack Murphy Stadium	Host of the All-Star Game; 1993	Succeeded by Three Rivers Stadium
