= 2015 Chicago White Sox–Baltimore Orioles crowdless game =

First such game in Major League Baseball history

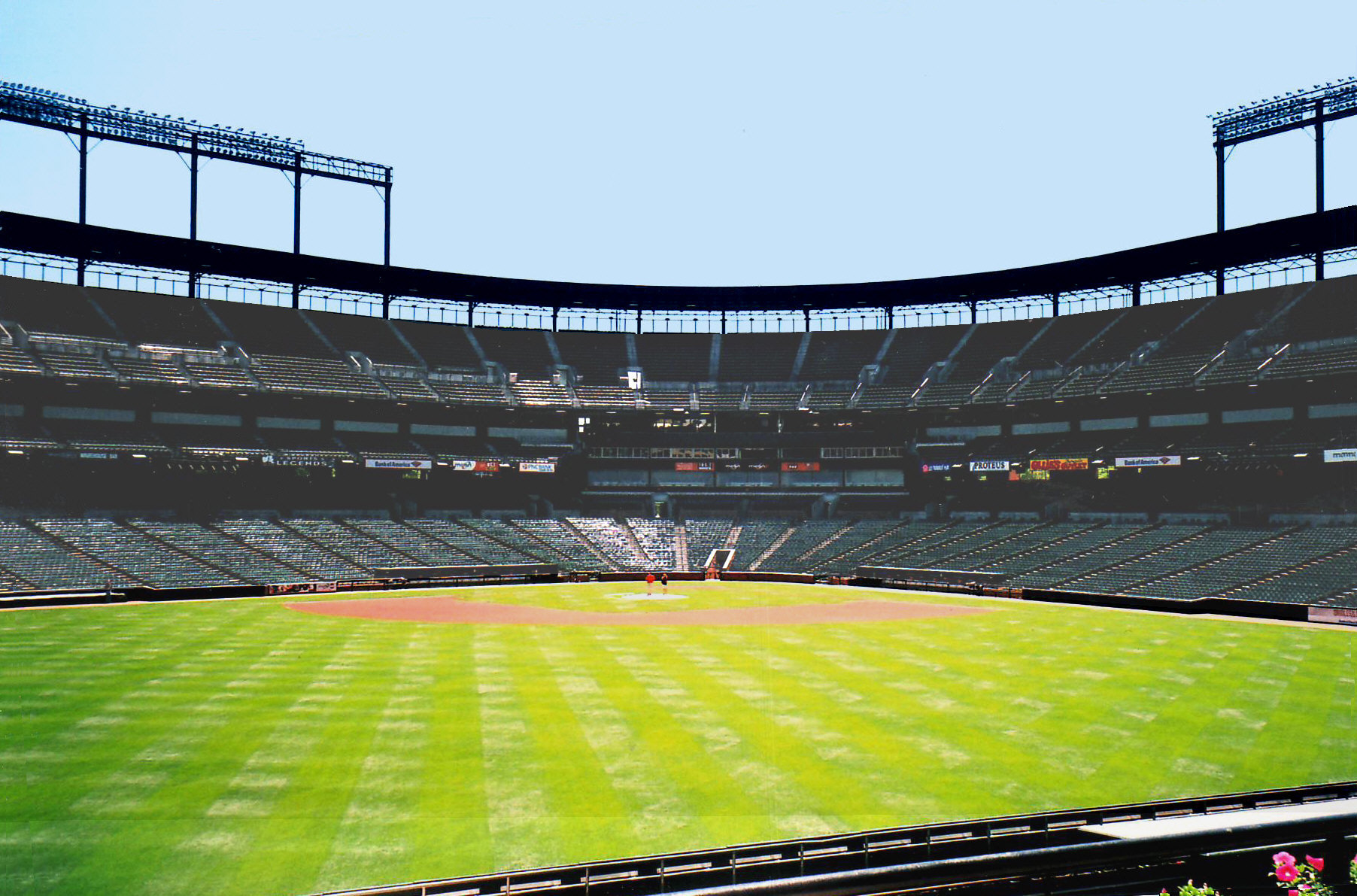
- Camden Yards with all seats empty, 2008
| | 1 | 2 | 3 | 4 | 5 | 6 | 7 | 8 | 9 | R | H | E |
|---|---|---|---|---|---|---|---|---|---|---|---|---|
| Chicago White Sox | 0 | 0 | 0 | 0 | 2 | 0 | 0 | 0 | 0 | 2 | 4 | 1 |
| Baltimore Orioles | 6 | 0 | 1 | 0 | 1 | 0 | 0 | 0 | X | 8 | 11 | 1 |
- Date: April 29, 2015
- Venue: Oriole Park at Camden Yards
- City: Baltimore, Maryland
- Managers: Robin Ventura (Chicago White Sox); Buck Showalter (Baltimore Orioles)
- Umpires: HP: Jerry Layne; 1B: Hunter Wendelstedt; 2B: Bob Davidson; 3B: David Rackley
- Attendance: N/A (Note: In its official records, MLB notes the attendance as simply "N/A".)
- Television: MASN, MLB.tv, WPWR-HD
- TV announcers: Gary Thorne and Jim Palmer (MASN); Ken Harrelson and Steve Stone (WPWR-HD)
- Radio: WJZ-FM, Baltimore Orioles Radio Network; WSCR, Chicago White Sox Radio Network
- Radio announcers: Joe Angel and Fred Manfra (Orioles Radio Network); Ed Farmer and Darrin Jackson; (White Sox Radio Network)

On April 29, 2015, the Baltimore Orioles defeated the Chicago White Sox 8–2 in the first crowdless game ever played by Major League Baseball teams. The lack of crowds was due to civil unrest in Baltimore following the death of Freddie Gray, an African-American man who was fatally injured while in police custody 10 days earlier. With all the civil unrest, there were insufficient security resources available for the game. The previous two games in the teams' series had been postponed, but the remaining game could neither be moved to another venue on short notice nor made up later in the season, so the decision was made to play the game at Camden Yards without allowing any fans to attend. The scheduled evening start time was also rescheduled to the afternoon for security reasons.

The stands were not completely empty; three times the usual number of reporters who covered a routine game were allowed in the press box to cover the game, which was telecast live, photographers roamed the stands taking pictures, team staff patrolled the stands to recover foul balls and home run balls, and three scouts also attended. Some fans who wanted to see the game live gathered near the stadium's back gate to take in the limited views from that vantage point, while others took in the more expansive view of the field from nearby high-rise hotels.

Players and media alike described the experience of a game played without any fans present as a surreal experience. White Sox outfielder Adam Eaton attributed his team's loss to the effect of the crowd's absence and their awareness of the reason for it. Reporters covering the game said conversations from the field could be heard in the press box, and likewise television and radio commentators could be heard on each other's broadcasts.

The decision to play without a crowd was controversial. Critics said the team should have done its best to allow fans in so the divided city could heal, or else just postpone the game. They pointed out that while previous incidents of civil unrest had forced games to be moved or postponed, fans had always been allowed to attend. The Washington Post suggested that ongoing litigation between the Orioles and the Washington Nationals over revenues from the Mid-Atlantic Sports Network cable channel, which carries both teams' games, may have led the Orioles to avoid moving the game to Nationals Park.

== April 2015 civil unrest in Baltimore ==
On the morning of April 12, 2015, Baltimore police officers arrested Freddie Gray, a 25-year-old African American man, in the Sandtown–Winchester neighborhood on the city's western outskirts, on a charge of possessing a switchblade knife. He appeared to be in good health at the time of his arrest and did not resist arrest, although he reportedly requested an inhaler. While being transported to the Western District police station to be booked, officers claimed Gray had become unruly in the back of the van and stopped several times to restrain and calm him. By the time they arrived, he had suffered severe injuries and would later undergo surgery for traumatic injuries to his spine at the R Adams Cowley Shock Trauma Center.

Gray went into a coma shortly afterwards. Protests over alleged police brutality that might have occurred on the van ride began on April 18 and continued after Gray's death the following day. By April 24, after the police had released records showing that Gray had not been injured either before or at the time of his arrest and the officers involved had been placed on paid leave pending investigation, Governor Larry Hogan deployed state troopers to the city to assist in maintaining order.

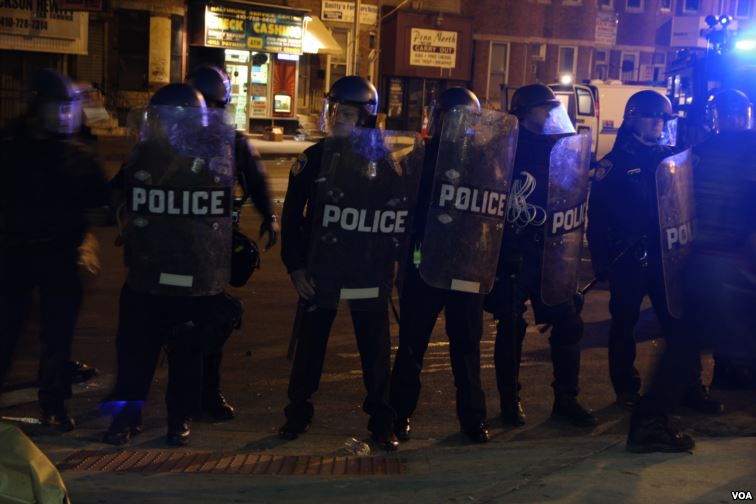
Baltimore police in riot gear

The following day, a march in the city's downtown Inner Harbor neighborhood started peacefully, but later turned violent, with some protesters smashing windows and vandalizing parked cars near Camden Yards, home stadium of the Baltimore Orioles Major League Baseball (MLB) team. Inside the stadium, the Orioles' game against the Boston Red Sox had gone into extra innings, and the stadium was locked down temporarily to prevent violence in the adjacent streets from spilling into it. Fans were also not allowed to leave until the police had restored order outside.

Despite pleas from Gray's relatives that protests remain peaceful, two days later riots erupted in several parts of the city after Gray's funeral. Roving gangs of youths broke windows, looted stores, lit fires, and threw cinder blocks at police, who in turn responded with tear gas, in several neighborhoods over the next two days. Governor Hogan called in the Maryland National Guard to supplement police efforts to restore order, and the state police requested assistance from their counterparts in neighboring states. Mayor Stephanie Rawlings-Blake decreed a 10 p.m.–5 a.m. curfew until further notice. The Orioles postponed the first two games in a series of three against the Chicago White Sox as a result of the violence.

=== Effect on Orioles' home games and decision to close doors ===
The two missed games were rescheduled as a doubleheader to be played in May. MLB arranged for the Orioles' next series, against the Tampa Bay Rays, to be played in St. Petersburg, Florida instead of Baltimore. But the remaining game with the White Sox could not be accommodated so easily. The collective bargaining agreement between the teams and the players' union limits the number of days on which games can be made up later in the season, (Note: MLB games are rarely canceled.) and there was insufficient lead time to move the game to Chicago.

Orioles' management decided to go ahead with the third game. To comply with the curfew, the game's start time was moved up to the afternoon from the night. Because law enforcement was busy dealing with the aftermath of the riots and the possibility of further violence, the team decided no fans would be admitted. Those who had tickets to the game were allowed to exchange them for tickets of equal value to any other upcoming home game until June 30.

Civil unrest, and other events such as the September 11, 2001, terrorist attacks, had affected the baseball schedule in the past, forcing postponements or relocations of games, and baseball games at lower levels had been played with spectators barred due to weather-related safety concerns (or, in one minor-league game, as a deliberate publicity stunt). But this was the first crowdless game in a century and a half of major-league play. Rawlings–Blake called it "another sad day for our city".

==== Possible role of business dispute with Nationals ====
The Washington Post observed that there was a more obvious solution the Orioles appeared not to have considered: playing the games at Nationals Park, home to the National League's Washington Nationals, in Washington, D.C., less than 40 miles (64 km) from Camden Yards. The Nationals were in the middle of a long road trip at the time and thus an MLB stadium a short distance from Baltimore was available. But while baseball commissioner Rob Manfred appeared to have suggested that possibility was under consideration earlier that week, the Nationals said later that neither MLB nor the Orioles had talked to them about it; nor had they made the offer themselves.

At the time, the Post further noted, the two teams were in litigation with each other over revenues from the Mid-Atlantic Sports Network (MASN) cable channel, a joint venture which broadcasts their games. While the newspaper agreed there were logistical challenges, it pointed out that those had not caused any problems moving the Rays' series to Tampa Bay, and that similar moves to the venues of third teams had been made in the past. A spokesman for the Orioles would not comment on whether the team's litigation against the Nationals over MASN had affected their scheduling decisions, although an unidentified source with the team told the Post it had.

==== Pregame criticism ====
Some commentators condemned the decision. White Sox Hall of Famer Frank Thomas tweeted that the whole series should have been postponed. "Playing in front of an empty house makes no sense!" ESPN anchor Keith Olbermann observed on his Twitter feed that the Orioles' were certain to break the MLB record for lowest attendance, set in 1882 when just six fans paid (Note: That 1882 game still stands as the lowest attendance at a major-league game for which tickets were sold, and is considered "unbreakable".) to see the National League's Worcester Ruby Legs play their penultimate game against the Troy Trojans, who had likewise had their franchise revoked by the league.

Those who were to participate in the game, either as players or stadium staff, anticipated an unusual experience. Oriole backup Steve Pearce said he expected it to feel "like a backfield spring training game". Tyler Flowers, Chicago's reserve catcher, said he looked forward to the respite from fans ridiculing him. Ryan Wagner, Camden Yards' public address announcer, said on Twitter that he was trying to figure out how to do his job with no public to address. "'Surreal' is barely scraping the surface."

== Game day ==
The morning of the game, White Sox center fielder Adam Eaton jokingly tweeted that "we're going to try to take the crowd out of the game early", drawing some critical responses for making light of the situation (although he also said that the absence of the crowd could cause problems for him and other outfielders, since they sometimes rely on crowd reaction to determine how to field hits). The oddity of an MLB game played without any fans in the stands drew heavy interest, and many of the national media already in the city covering the riots and their aftermath applied for credentials to cover the game. All 92 available seats in the press box were taken, three times as many as had been for the first (postponed) game in the series, and not enough for the media who did show up. "Ironically," The Baltimore Sun observed, "on a day when there were no fans in the stands, the press level was standing room only."

=== Fan efforts to view game live ===
What if there was a baseball game and there was no one there to see it? Did it really happen?

— Brett Edgerton, ESPN, alluding to a common philosophical question

The decision to play the game behind closed doors did not pre-empt media coverage. MASN would carry it in the Baltimore market, with White Sox regular broadcaster WPWR-TV bringing it to Chicago area viewers. MLB.tv made it the free game of the day for its subscribers, except for those in the Baltimore and Chicago areas, where it would be blacked out, in accordance with their policy.

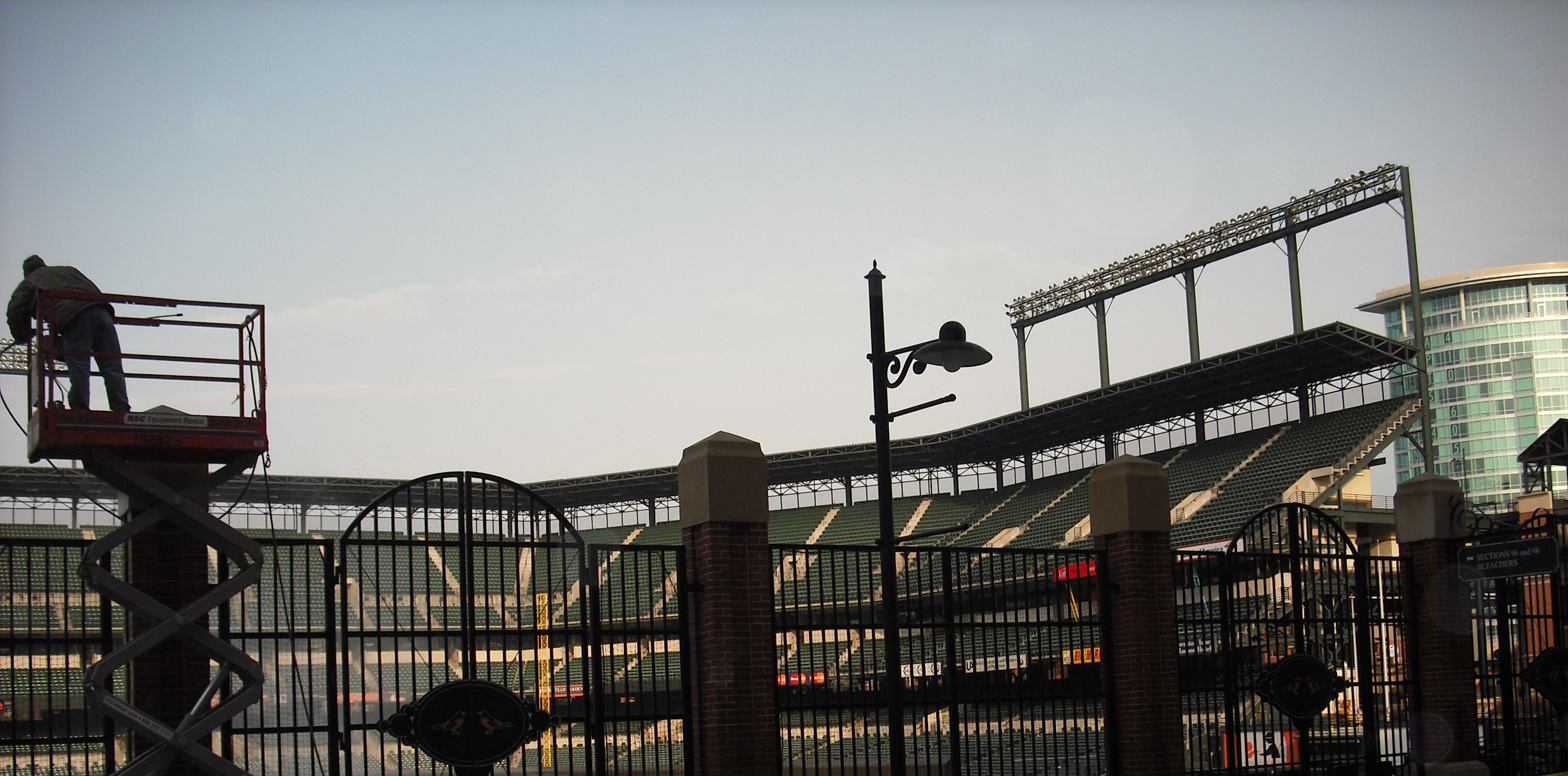
View into the stadium from outside the back fence

Some fans were determined to see the game in person. They lined up outside one of the stadium's rear gates, where a limited view of the field was available, and relied on the radio and Internet to follow the game in detail. Others rented rooms on the upper floors of the Hilton Baltimore, which overlooks the stadium from right field, and watched from the balconies and roof.

Fans in the former group had started gathering outside the gate three hours earlier; some had come from as far away as Chincoteague, Virginia, at the south end of the Delmarva Peninsula, two of whom had brought trash bags along to help with post-riot cleanup. "The city gets a bad rep back home. We're constantly sticking up for it", one of the Virginians told the Sun. "We wanted to do something. We know there's not a whole lot we can do."

Also among those watching from the fence was Kweisi Mfume, former U.S. congressman from Baltimore, and head of the National Association for the Advancement of Colored People, who had originally come downtown to do a television interview but went over to the fence afterward. An Orioles season ticket holder since the 1980s, he recalled to the Sun having watched games at the team's former home, Memorial Stadium, and seeing pitcher Jay Heard, the franchise's first African-American player since its move to Baltimore from St. Louis, from the sections of the then-segregated stadium set aside for black fans. "It's surreal", he said. "It's kind of eerie, especially when you juxtapose it to what's happening on these corners that I've just left all over the city." He reserved judgement on whether the game should have been played, but observed that players' public comments on the situation expressed a desire to "give people for two or three hours a sense of normalcy during a very disruptive situation."

One fan on the streets, Steve Orzol of Joppa, chose to protest the closure of the stadium to spectators. He walked up and down Camden Street carrying a sign showing the team's mascot bird with a tear in its eye, faulting the mayor for allowing this to happen. "[S]he needs to do the right thing", he said, and persuade MLB to open the game. "If you open up these gates, show the country that it's not as bad as you think Baltimore is. What is this going to do to tourism?"

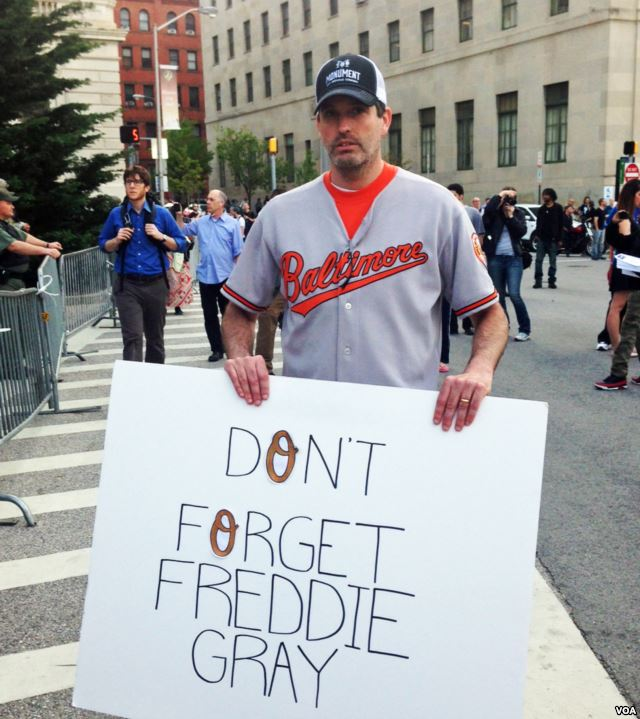
Brendan Hurson carrying his sign

Another protester, Brendan Hurson, a public defender, walked up and down Camden Street wearing an Orioles jersey and carrying a sign urging that Freddie Gray not be forgotten. He opposed the closure of the game to fans. "So many chances were lost by locking us out," he told The New York Times. "It sends the wrong message about what this city is really about."

Fans who reserved rooms at the Hilton paid over $200 to do so. In return they were able to enjoy unobstructed views, supplemented by television and radio coverage; some invited friends. "They said it was no fans, but fans are watching wherever they can like us," one said. "Just to be able to look in and see this, it's tragic, but it's historic," another told the Sun expressing the hope that the divided city could unite around its baseball team.

=== Game ===
This is one of those moments you may make history but you really really wish you didn't have to do it.

— Gary Thorne, MASN announcer, at the beginning of the telecast

Despite the absence of fans, some aspects of the game persisted. Players on both teams lined up in midfield and placed their hats across their chests, along with the umpires, for the national anthem, which was played over the stadium's public address system rather than sung from the field as the Orioles typically had had it performed. At "O say does that star-spangled banner yet wave ...", the fans gathered behind the rear gate could be heard making their customary augmentation of the first word.

Nevertheless, the unusual situation did not go unacknowledged. Orioles' catcher Caleb Joseph, after finishing his pregame warmups, ran along the fence high-fiving nonexistent fans, at one point stopping to mime signing an autograph, on his way to the bullpen. "Laughter does something for the soul", he said later. A teammate, first baseman Chris Davis, who before the game had lamented that "this isn't the way you want to make history", similarly tossed balls he had caught for the final out of the inning into the seats behind the dugout, despite the lack of fans to catch them as souvenirs.

Orioles' starter Ubaldo Jiménez threw the first pitch at 2:06 p.m. Eastern Daylight Time. Fans behind the back gate could be heard cheering when he struck out Eaton, the Sox' leadoff hitter. The next two batters were also retired, and Baltimore took the plate for what turned out to be a decisive six-run first.

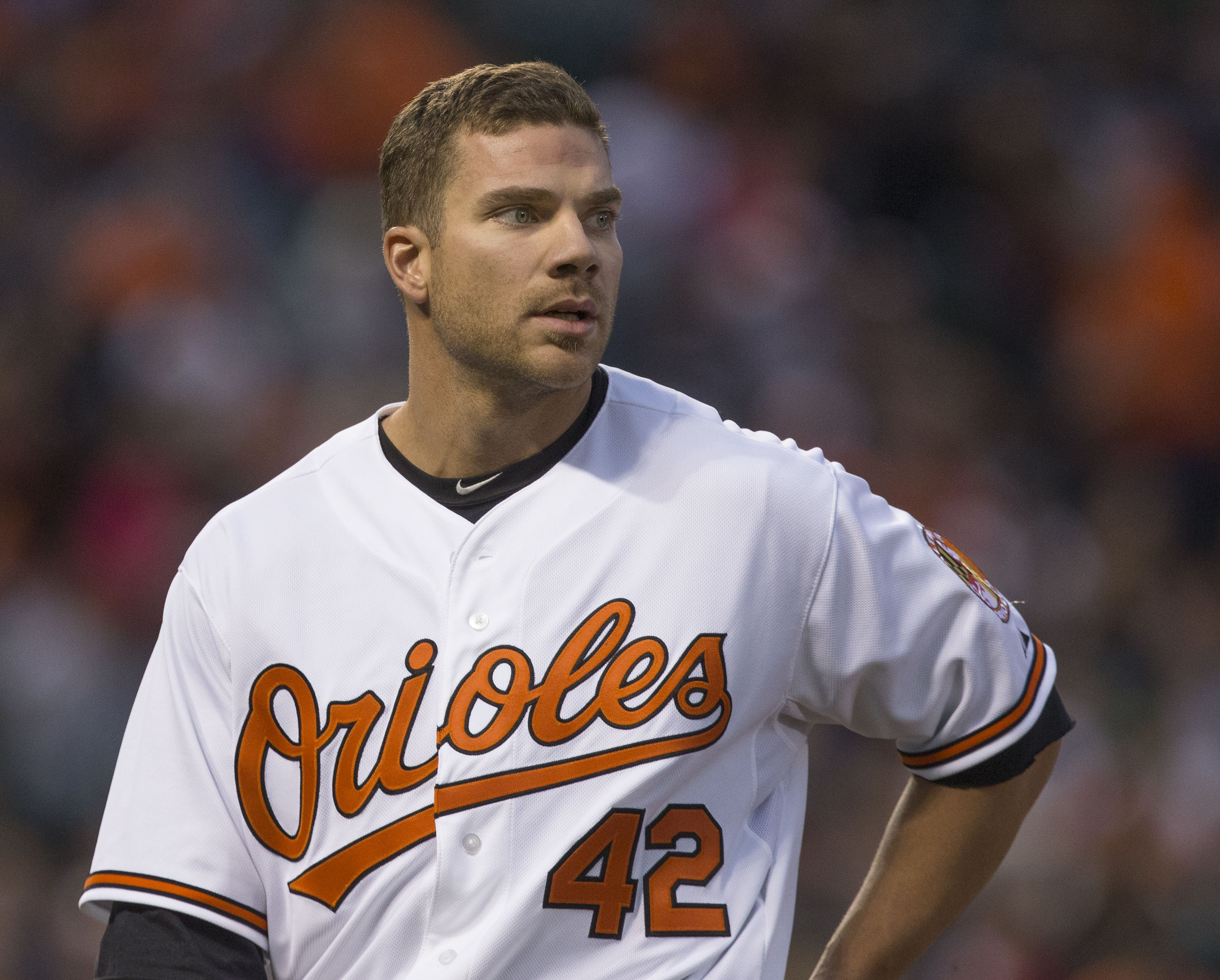
Chris Davis, whose three-run homer provided half the scoring in the Orioles' first inning

After leadoff hitter Alejandro de Aza walked, Jimmy Paredes reached first on an error and Delmon Young got the game's first base hit, loading the bases. Center fielder Adam Jones opened the scoring with a sacrifice fly that sent de Aza across the plate. Davis's three-run homer to right field immediately followed, landing outside a men's room in a closed walkway near the Eutaw Street gate. Several innings later, reporters noted, the ball was still where it had landed, which would not have been the case had fans been in attendance.

Throughout the game, team employees patrolled the stands to retrieve foul balls hit there, a task normally not done as fans catch them and are permitted to keep them. At one point during Jones' at-bat in the first inning, a ball bounced out of the stands back onto the field, again something that rarely happens when fans are in the stands. A reporter for CBS Sports speculated that this allowed the Orioles to cut their losses on the game and reuse the baseballs.

Davis's home run also brought out some other nuances of the game resulting from the absence of a crowd. As it became apparent that the ball was going out of play, MASN play-by-play announcer Gary Thorne made his trademark "Good-bye, home run!" call. It could be heard all over the stadium, even by the fans outside, as it was when Orioles' third baseman Manny Machado hit the game's other home run.

Some semblances of a normal game were retained. Wagner identified each batter by name and position as they walked up to the plate, and then played their preferred walk-up music for each one. Musical interludes also accompanied players' warmups between and in the middle of innings. However, there were none of the videos on the scoreboard, such as hot-dog races, crabs playing three-card monte or the kiss cam, used to keep fans engaged during breaks in play such as television timeouts, since there were no fans to distract. Those breaks were instead marked with the team logo, Big Oriole, on the scoreboard.

The Orioles got another run when Joseph drove in Machado with a no-out single before a fly and double play ended the third inning. In the fifth, Chicago finally scored when designated hitter Adam LaRoche took advantage of a fielding error, followed by right fielder Avisaíl García taking advantage of a fielder's choice on a Geovany Soto ground ball. Machado's solo home run in the bottom of the inning finished out the scoring for the game; Sox manager Robin Ventura replaced his starter, Jeff Samardzija, with Scott Carroll for the next inning.

Both media and players said it was the sounds they did not usually hear at games that imbued the event with as much of its strangeness as the absence of sounds they were used to hearing, such as the crowd's roar. Thorne's call on Davis's home run could be heard in the background of Sox announcer Ken Harrelson's call, an experience one reporter tweeted evoked minor league games. The two broadcast teams are separated by a wall that normally prevents this from happening; Thorne said afterwards that the Sox announcers were teasingly telling him and color commentator Jim Palmer to speak more quietly.

Players could hear not only the TV announcers but conversations in the press box, to the point that Jones acknowledged a familiar voice calling out to someone else from that level while standing in the on-deck circle. Orioles' manager Buck Showalter said he could hear the phone ring in the bullpen from the dugout; the relief pitchers there, in turn, said they could not only hear conversations among the outfielders but the individual pitch calls made by home plate umpire Jerry Layne, which are almost always inaudible under normal game conditions.

Showalter said conversations in the dugout were tempered by the awareness that the umpires and the media could hear them; likewise, Chicago second baseman Micah Johnson said that he tried to moderate his verbal reactions to mistakes. "It's quiet. There's nothing going on. You hear everything", he told the Chicago Tribune. The unusual distractions were not only auditory: he added that the glare of sunlight off the empty seats made it hard to concentrate on the ball when playing in the field.

External videos
- Gary Thorne calling Adam Jones' at-bat in his "Masters" voice

The seventh-inning stretch was marked, as usual, with "Take Me Out to the Ball Game" followed by John Denver's "Thank God I'm a Country Boy" on the stadium's sound system. In the bottom of the inning, as the game's outcome appeared less and less doubtful, Thorne, like Joseph and Davis earlier in the game, took the opportunity to find some humor in the situation. As Jones came up to bat, having failed to hit successfully since his first-inning sacrifice fly, Thorne called it in the hushed tone of voice commonly used by golf announcers such as Jim Nantz. A deep fly to center off reliever Scott Carroll turned into a double off the outfield fence for Jones' first (and only) hit of the game, leading Thorne to say "that green jacket appears well within reach", alluding to the garment given to the winner of the annual Masters Tournament.

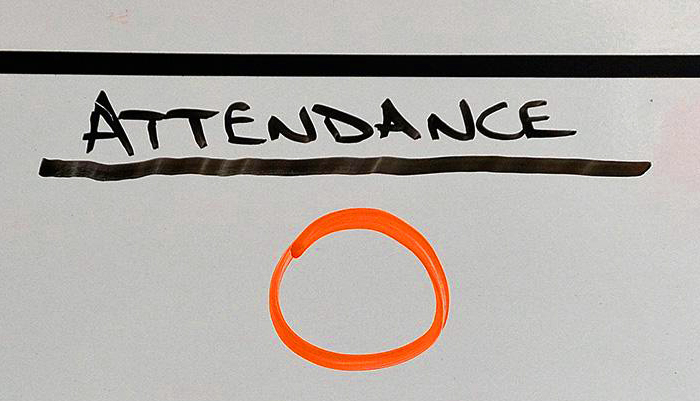
Zero attendance figure on the whiteboard in the press box

Outside the press box, the stands were not entirely empty. In addition to the team staff retrieving fouls, television cameramen set up in their usual locations, and photographers roamed freely, taking pictures not only of the action on the field but the empty concourses and closed concession stands. Other than those groups, three scouts for other major league teams sat near home plate and watched the action, evaluating players for possible trades or free agency signings. While their actions put them the closest to conventional spectators, they did not have to pay to attend, and thus at the end of the eighth inning, in accordance with MLB rules, the Orioles announced, and put on the scoreboard, that day's paid attendance: an unprecedented zero.

Emilio Bonifacio opened the top of the ninth inning with a pinch-hit single off closer Zach Britton. It was the last of the four hits allowed by him and Jiménez; Kevin Gausman had retired the side in relief the previous inning, as Carlos Rodon had done in turn for the Sox in the bottom of the eighth, the only one of the team's pitchers to allow no hits while Carroll and Samardzija combined to give up 11. Both teams committed only a single error apiece; Jiménez would be credited with the win and Samardzija the loss. LaRoche struck out swinging to end the game at 4:09 p.m., a mere 2 hours and 3 minutes after it started.

April 29, 2015 2:06 pm (EDT) at Oriole Park at Camden Yards in Baltimore, Maryland
| Team | 1 | 2 | 3 | 4 | 5 | 6 | 7 | 8 | 9 | R | H | E |
|---|---|---|---|---|---|---|---|---|---|---|---|---|
| Chicago White Sox | 0 | 0 | 0 | 0 | 2 | 0 | 0 | 0 | 0 | 2 | 4 | 1 |
| Baltimore Orioles | 6 | 0 | 1 | 0 | 1 | 0 | 0 | 0 | x | 8 | 11 | 1 |
WP: Ubaldo Jiménez (2–1) LP: Jeff Samardzija (1–2); Home runs: CWS: None; BAL: Chris Davis (5), Manny Machado (4); Attendance: 0

=== Economic impact of closure ===
The Sun attempted to estimate how much money the Orioles lost by closing the game to fans. Since it could not be known how many might have shown up had the game been played at night, as originally scheduled, the paper offered a "reasonable estimate" of 25,000, slightly over half Camden Yards' capacity. With an average ticket price of $25, the team was likely foregoing $600,000 just from ticket sales, in addition to a nearly equal amount from parking and concessions, for a total loss of over $1 million.

Sports Business Daily noted that that would be further exacerbated by the relocation of the subsequent series with the Tampa Bay Rays to that area; none of the other series between the two teams scheduled for Tampa would be relocated to Baltimore as compensation, and the newspaper suggested that the Orioles might likely have to seek some relief from MLB's central fund. Britton criticized the Rays for not being flexible enough and finding a way to come back up to Baltimore. "This is a bigger issue than just baseball and you'd think that they'd have some compassion and come up here when we're supposed to go there. But, unfortunately, that's not the case." Showalter, his manager, said the Rays had hoped to do so, but a concert had been scheduled during the only available series.

The team was not the only party to suffer financially from the game. Ushers and concession stand personnel, who had already missed the two earlier games that had been postponed, were not needed at the crowdless game. Sportswriter Bill Baer set up a GoFundMe page for fans to contribute and make up the difference to their paychecks (he later refunded all the donations when the Orioles informed him that they had indeed paid the workers for the lost games). The manager of a nearby bar said business had been down 90 percent from its usual levels there all week; most of the few customers he had were reporters. One of his bartenders pointed to the $8 in the tip bucket, which she said usually reached hundreds of dollars on game days.

== Reactions ==
=== Participants ===
There was a real intimacy because everybody understood that they were going to be involved in something that might never happen again—hopefully, doesn't—and a unique situation, and this is the group of people who are going to be inside experiencing it.

— Thorne,

A year later, Eaton, who had seen smoke rising from the affected areas of the city from his hotel room and watched protesters get arrested when he walked across the street to get lunch during the two days of postponed games, admitted to the Sun he had underestimated the effect of not having fans present. "To be honest with you, when I first went into it I didn't think it would be a big deal ... [but there was almost this half-asleep feel because there was no energy." He believes that discomfort resulted in his teammates' letting the Orioles effectively win the game in the first inning. "[I]t's a very surreal and weird moment that I'll never forget but I kind of wish I could ... I think everyone just kind of wanted to put it in the back of our minds as a team when we left there." "It was just a surreal environment," Ventura agreed. "I don't think we really want to play another one like this. ... I don't think (the Orioles) do either."

Davis, whose home run that inning resulted in more runs than the Sox collectively produced, was more upbeat. He felt emotionally buoyed by the sound of the fans outside as he rounded the bases. "It was such a unique situation to be in and I think as a group of guys, I was really proud about the way we handled it and tried to take the positive about it. I think that was big."

"It was still baseball between the lines" Showalter told reporters after the game, praising his players for overcoming the distraction. He had also drawn praise for his conciliatory answer about the situation in the city to a young local African-American man covering his first-ever game for his website, and on the anniversary said he was still "real proud of everything, the whole organization ... When you go through something like that, you just want to make sure you think about what you say, and a year from now I want to look back and say you still feel that way."

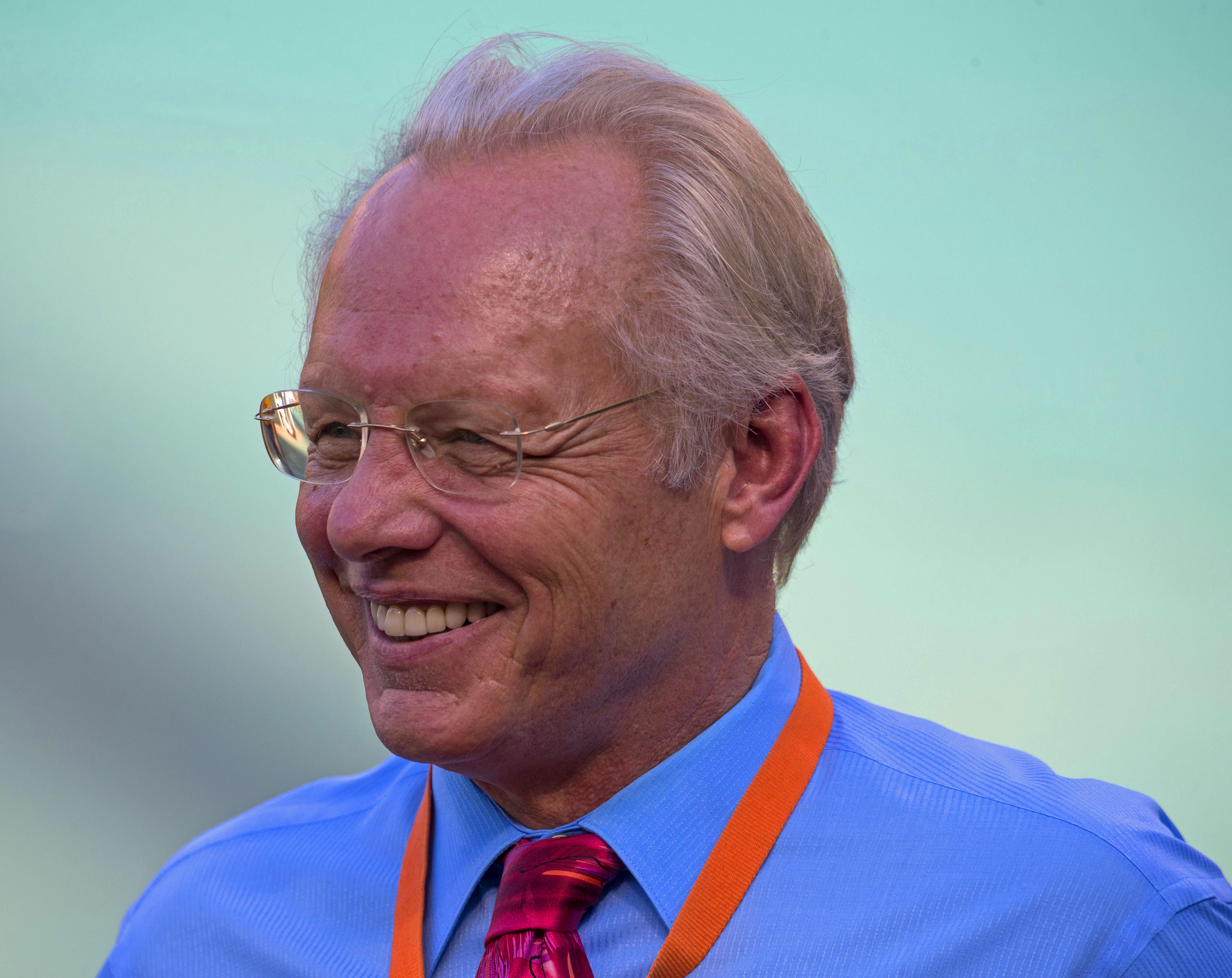
Gary Thorne

Thorne said that while closing the game to fans was a close call, he felt it was the right one. He admitted that before the game he was apprehensive about it, and decided not to do anything differently than he usually did. "I just went to the ballpark to try and do a baseball game, and just let it flow", he told the Huffington Post. As he called the game, however, he began realizing that the energy of the crowd was missing, and tried to make up for that. For that reason he greatly appreciated the fans who gathered outside the park and on the hotel balconies. "They cheered different plays, they cheered players, they hollered out player's names", he recalled. "I think that's the moment I'll remember about this game, are those fans that were outside doing that."

Almost as special for Thorne was one of the sounds he had never been able to hear at any baseball game he had called before: the players' verbal interactions with each other. "I thought that was pretty good. I thought that was interesting," he said. "It's going back to the little boys playing a man's game. This is the stuff you did in Little League, they're hollering the same stuff ... [T]o hear that, kind of made you smile."

=== Others ===
The controversy over whether the game should have been played without fans did not end with the game. Commentators, not all of them from the sports community, weighed in afterwards.

ESPN's Howard Bryant supported the decision. He recalled that in the aftermath of the previous year's riots and protests over another African American man's death at police hands in Ferguson, Missouri, protesters in downtown St. Louis had been confronted by spectators leaving Rams' and Cardinals' games, a situation the closure avoided. His colleague Jemele Smith agreed, noting how MLB was constrained by its scheduling practices. Another ESPN commentator, Tony Kornheiser, however, wondered why fans were allowed to congregate on the streets outside the stadium, given the stated security concerns.

Los Angeles Times columnist Bill Plaschke called the game "surely one of [baseball]'s lowest moments". He contrasted it with how the Los Angeles Dodgers had adapted to the 1992 riots there by scheduling many of the four missed home games as doubleheaders, even though playing 10 games in six days later in the season adversely affected the team that year. Plaschke suggested that it would have been possible to make up the game during the All-Star break. "Normalcy on Wednesday was swallowed up in a scene that should chill fans who have long used sports as a way to connect," he concluded. "It was the day sports was silenced."

Deron Snyder of The Washington Times faulted MLB and the Orioles for not considering Nationals Park. He suspected that ongoing litigation between the two teams over MASN played a part. "Apparently, any solution that didn't involve the Nationals would do. The Orioles must've abhorred the thought of Washington looking good, reaping any benefit or coming off as a savior."

On Brian Kilmeade's Fox News Radio show, former New York City mayor Rudolph Giuliani also criticized the Orioles for playing without fans. In addition to saying Baltimore should have acted more aggressively to contain the riots, as he said he had done when mayor, he recalled how he had worked to make sure the Yankees and the Mets could resume playing home games, with fans in the stands, in the city within two weeks after the September 11 attacks, a time when there was still concern that those games themselves could become terror targets. "If this was New York, that game would be played," Giuliani said.

=== Possible benefits ===
The game's brevity led some commentators to suggest that MLB could best address its pace of play concerns by playing all games without fans. "Baseball might have found the magic formula to speeding up games: no fans" wrote Austin Knoblauch in the Los Angeles Times Showalter, too, noted that "[s]ome of the altercations we've had early in the season, I was thinking how much of that is feeding off crowd reaction? Would we have had those same altercations if there wasn't?" Nevertheless, he said he preferred having fans.

=== Humor ===
Late night talk show host Conan O'Brien sounded a common theme in humorous popular culture responses to the game. "When asked for comments," he said during a monologue on his show, "players on the Milwaukee Brewers said, 'You get used to it.'"

Several days later, NBC's popular sketch comedy program Saturday Night Live ran a sketch spoofing the game and the telecast, particularly how common aspects of baseball on television such as the kiss cam would be handled without a crowd, and touching on some things that had really occurred at the game such as batters being able to hear commentators in the broadcast booth. Taran Killam and Kenan Thompson portrayed past Orioles' stars Jim Palmer and Frank Robinson calling the game (Note: While Palmer was a longtime broadcaster, mostly for the Orioles, Robinson was not.) despite not only the absence of fans but a heavy National Guard presence, which required the teams to use a Nerf bat and shot down a fly ball with a military drone; Bobby Moynihan played a hotdog vendor with no one to sell to. The two announcers frequently had to revise their commentary when they used words and phrases with connotations suggesting the recent riots, and at the end of the sketch decided to join a sideline reporter played by guest host Scarlett Johansson who was last seen not at the stadium but on the platforms at Penn Station, waiting to catch a train to Newark where she had decided she would be safer.

== See also ==
- Announcerless game, a 1980 NFL game between the New York Jets and the Miami Dolphins broadcast on television without any announcers
- 2015 Major League Baseball season
- 2020 Major League Baseball season, with all regular-season games played without fans in attendance due to the COVID-19 pandemic.
- List of nicknamed MLB games and plays
