= Babe's Dream =

Statue of Babe Ruth in Baltimore, Maryland, U.S.

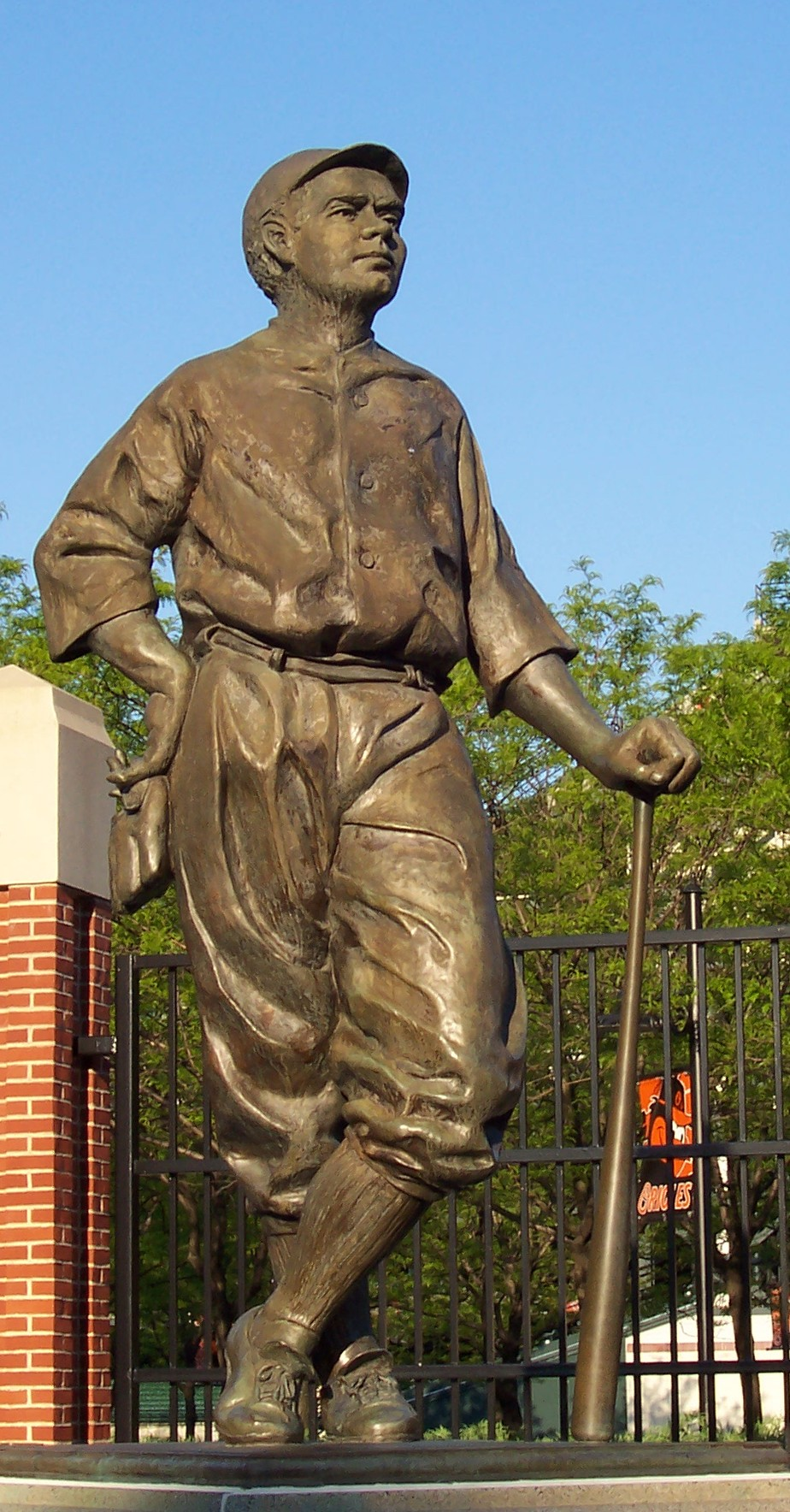
- Artist: Susan Luery
- Year: 1995
- Medium: Bronze
- Dimensions: 16 feet (4.9 m) tall
- Location: Baltimore, Maryland, U.S.; 39°17′5.81″N 76°37′14.56″W
- Owner: Maryland Stadium Authority

Babe's Dream is a 1995 bronze statue of Babe Ruth, by Susan Luery. It is located at West Camden Street and South Eutaw Street, at Oriole Park at Camden Yards, Baltimore.

The statue contains an error in that Ruth is depicted with a right-handed fielder's glove, for wear on the left hand. Ruth threw left-handed.

== Statue ==
Although he became famous as a New York Yankee, George Herman Ruth's roots are in Baltimore, where he was born, grew up, and learned how to play baseball. Babe's Dream portrays Ruth as a young man, about the time he started out as a rookie, as Luery wanted to portray Babe's longing for the big leagues and to find an escape from his harsh childhood.

Ruth was born on February 6, 1895, to hardworking parents who couldn't support a child that caused as much “mischief” as Babe. At age seven, his parents decided to “straighten him out” by sending him to Baltimore's St. Mary's Industrial School for Boys, where he could learn how to have more discipline. This turned out to be the beginning of the star's true love for the game of baseball.

Babe Ruth is considered a legend in the world of baseball. He played baseball for 22 years, setting the records for career home runs at 714 and holding that record until 1974 when Hank Aaron surpassed it. Ruth is credited with changing the game of baseball in America, and his hometown wanted to present his accomplishments by dedicating a statue to him and his legend.

Luery portrayed Ruth as a competitor as he is gazing out into the future. “A man looking at his destiny,” is how Susan Luery put it. “His poise was in the sense of determination that he was a great player,” she said. “He’s facing out – he had everything in front of him. Ruth’s career rose pretty much straight into the record books from there.”

== Artist ==
Susan Luery was born in Baltimore, Maryland, and attended the Maryland Institute College of Art where she learned to refine her work. Luery researched Ruth by reading books and talking to people with both knowledge of Ruth and baseball so she could “connect” with the subject. She also had a look-alike model come to her studio while she worked on the statue. It took her seven months to form the 28-inch model statue before creating the large-scale version.

She produced the 16-foot statue a year later, in 1994, and it was placed in the Camden Yards on Babe Ruth's 100th birthday in February 1995. The statue was officially unveiled at an Orioles game where Luery and Ruth's daughter, Julia Ruth Stevens, threw out the game ball in celebration.

== See also ==
- List of public art in Baltimore
