= Pilot Field (disambiguation) =

Pilot Field, now Sahlen Field, is a baseball stadium in Buffalo, New York, United States.

Pilot Field may also refer to:

- Pilot Field (LSUS), a baseball stadium at Louisiana State University Shreveport
- The Pilot Field, an association football stadium in Hastings, East Sussex, England
- Pilot Field, now Joe Etzel Field, a college baseball stadium in Portland, Oregon
